= Holdsworth, West Yorkshire =

Village in West Yorkshire, England

Coordinates: 53.756925°N 1.876088°W

Holdsworth
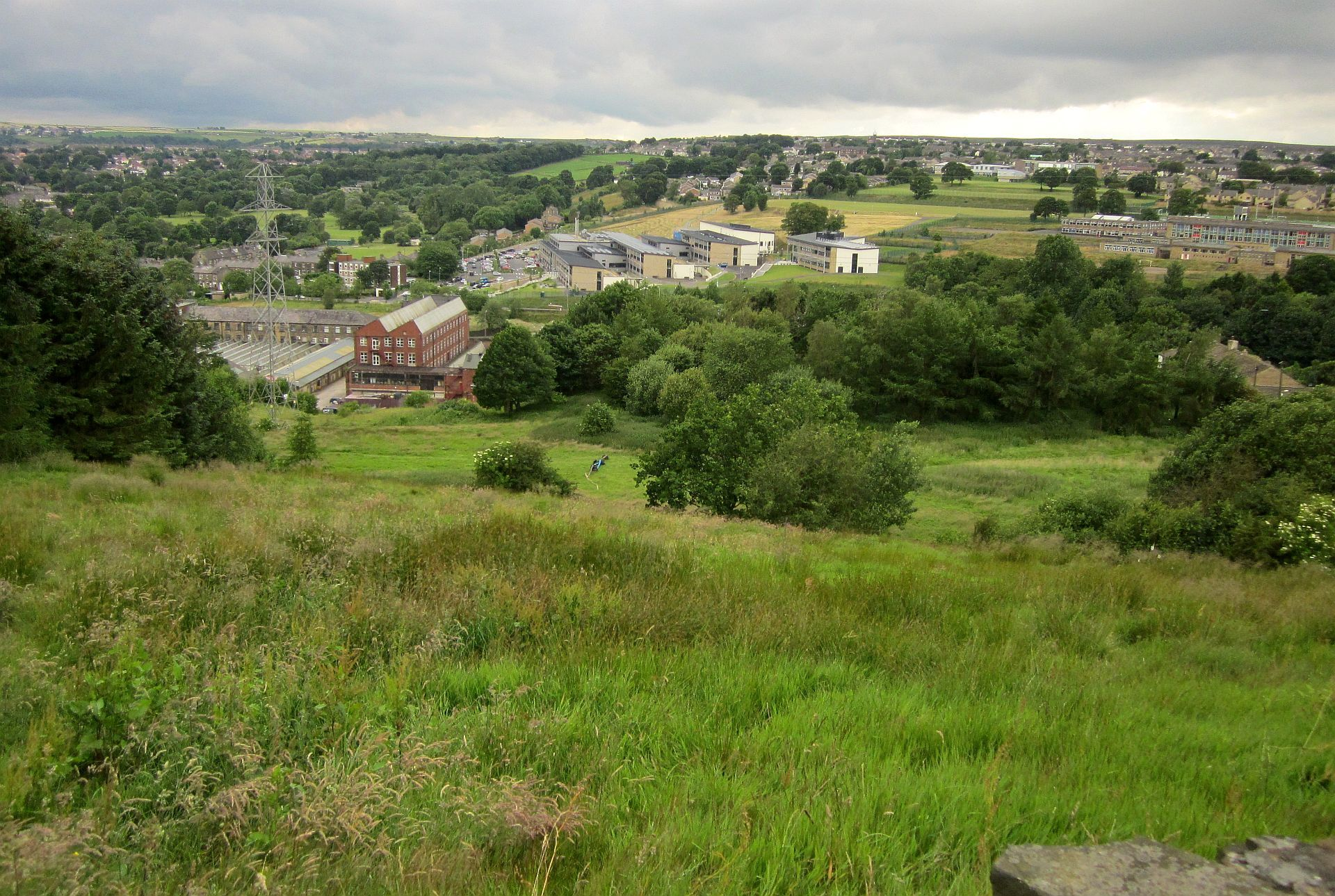
- Holdsworth from Crooked Lane

- Location within West Yorkshire
- OS grid reference: SE 082 290
- Metropolitan borough: Calderdale
- Metropolitan county: West Yorkshire
- Region: Yorkshire and the Humber
- Country: England
- Sovereign state: United Kingdom
- Post town: HALIFAX
- Postcode district: HX2
- Police: West Yorkshire
- Fire: West Yorkshire
- Ambulance: Yorkshire

Holdsworth is an area of Halifax in West Yorkshire, England, 2.5 miles (4 km) north of the town centre. It was historically a village in the township of Ovenden, in the ancient parish of Halifax in the West Riding of Yorkshire. Since 1974, it has been part of the Metropolitan Borough of Calderdale.

Holdsworth House is a Jacobean mansion built in 1633, now used as a hotel. It is a Grade II* listed building.

Holdsworth was also the site of St Catherine's Catholic High School, which closed in 2013 and is now part of Trinity Academy. Since 2016, the school buildings have been used as 'Ackley Bridge College' for the Channel 4 school-based drama Ackley Bridge.
