= Trinity Academy =

Trinity Academy may refer to:

== India ==
- Trinity Academy, Namakkal, Tamil Nadu, India

== United Kingdom ==
- Trinity Academy Bradford, West Yorkshire, England
- Trinity Academy, Bristol, England
- Trinity Academy, Brixton, London, England
- Trinity Academy Cathedral, Wakefield, West Yorkshire, England
- Trinity Academy, Edinburgh, Scotland
- Trinity Academy, Halifax, West Yorkshire, England
- Trinity Academy, Thorne, Doncaster, England

== United States ==
- Trinity Academy (Kansas), Wichita, Kansas, United States
- Trinity Academy (Portland, Oregon), Portland, Oregon, United States
- Trinity Academy (Raleigh, North Carolina), Raleigh, North Carolina, United States
- Trinity Academy (Wisconsin), Pewaukee, Wisconsin, United States
