= Pat Ashton =

English actress (1931–2013)

- Born: 28 February 1931; Wood Green, London, England
- Died: 23 June 2013 (aged 82); Diss, Norfolk, England
- Occupation: Actress
- Years active: 1965–1984
- Spouse: Geoff Godwin (1953–1985) (divorced)
- Children: 2

Pat Ashton (28 February 1931 – 23 June 2013) was an English actress. Her engaging cockney, blonde persona is best remembered for appearances in English TV-sitcom film spin-offs On the Buses (1971) and Mutiny on the Buses (1972). She was married to Geoff Godwin 1953–1985.

== Early life ==
Ashton was born and raised in Wood Green, north London. Trained from childhood as a singer and tap-dancer, she performed in the 1950s at seaside resorts around England in summer season shows. In the early 1960s, she toured Europe with Joan Littlewood's Theatre Workshop in Oh, What a Lovely War!. Early West End appearances included Half a Sixpence and The Matchgirls.

== Career ==
Ashton's first television break was taking the role of Fanny Cornforth opposite Oliver Reed in Ken Russell's Danté's Inferno (1967), a film for the Omnibus series on the life of Dante Gabriel Rossetti. The part later led to a small role in Russell's 1971 film The Devils.

In 1970, Ashton's chirpy, blonde persona found her understudying Barbara Windsor in the Ned Sherrin-produced musical Sing a Rude Song, based on the life of music hall singer Marie Lloyd; she successfully took the lead role when Windsor was struck down with laryngitis.

Ashton played numerous TV roles; credits include: On the Buses (1971) – subsequently making appearances in two spin-off films; The Benny Hill Show (1972–80); Both Ends Meet (1972, with Dora Bryan); Don't Drink the Water (1975, an On the Buses spin-off); Yus, My Dear (1976, with Arthur Mullard), "Dixon of Dock Green" Jackpot 1976;Rooms (1977); Only When I Laugh (1980, with James Bolam); The Gaffer (1981–83, with Bill Maynard), Tripper's Day (1984, with Leonard Rossiter) and The Beer Hunter Minder Episode 1980 (with Dennis Waterman, George Cole). In Thick As Thieves (1974) she was cast as Annie, wife of a burglar (Bob Hoskins) who comes out of prison to find that his old friend (John Thaw) has moved in,

On stage, she later appeared in Stepping Out, and was a regular performer at the Players' Theatre in London.

== Partial filmography ==
- Half a Sixpence (1967) – Pub Character
- On the Buses (1971) – Sally
- The Devils (1971) – Gossiping woman (uncredited)
- Mutiny on the Buses (1972) – Norah
- Nearest and Dearest (1972) – Freda
- The Optimists of Nine Elms a.k.a. The Optimists (1973) – Woman at Nursery
- Party Party (1983) – Johnny's Mum
- Bloodbath at the House of Death (1983) – Barmaid
