= North Halifax Grammar School =

The North Halifax Grammar School
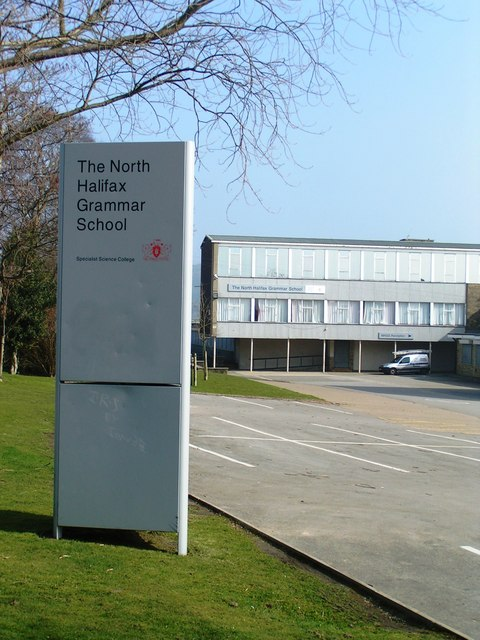

Location
- Moorbottom Road; Illingworth, Halifax, West Yorkshire, HX2 9SU; England; 53.7556°N 1.8828°W

Information
- School type: Grammar school; Academy State-funded Grammar School
- Motto: Living to Learn & Learning to Live
- Established: 1985
- Local authority: Calderdale
- Specialist: Science
- Department for Education URN: 136788 Tables
- Ofsted: Reports
- Chair of Governors: Amanda Cade
- Headteacher: Miss Alex Kent
- Gender: Mixed
- Age: 11 to 18
- Enrolment: 1090
- Colours: Red & Grey
- Former name: North Halax High School, The Highlands School
- Website: http://www.nhgs.co.uk

The North Halifax Grammar School (NHGS) is a state grammar school, and former specialist Science college (with academy status) in Illingworth, Halifax, West Yorkshire, England.

== 11+ ==
The school has approximately one thousand students, aged 11 to 18. NHGS works with The Crossley Heath School to administer an admissions test, admitting 180 students aged 11 each year through an entrance examination which consists of Verbal Reasoning, Mathematics and English tests. The examination takes place when students who wish to come to the school begin Year 6, and students are accepted from the top 500 entries the following March. Admissions are accepted between ages 11 and 16 from other schools, with tests in English, Mathematics, Science and Modern Foreign Languages at an appropriate level administered. Admissions at age 16 to the Sixth Form requires GCSE grades of 6+, with subject specific entry requirements listed on the website. As of October 2024, both schools announced that they were reviewing the entrance examination for prospective 2026 entrants into Year 7.

== History ==
The Princess Mary High School (which was known as Halifax High School for Girls before 1931) had around 350 girls and was opened on 21 September 1931 by Princess Mary. It became known as the Princess Mary School in 1969 and was situated on Francis Street. There was a Service of Thanksgiving in July 1985 at the Halifax Parish Church when the school amalgamated with The Highlands School to become North Halifax High School.The buildings remained in use as part of North Halifax High School, though with some facilities used by the Percival Whitley College, until in 1987 all school pupils moved to the former Highlands School site and the buildings were taken over by the College, later becoming part of Halifax New College (which eventually became Calderdale College when it combined with the Halifax School of Integrated Arts). The site is currently scheduled to be demolished and redeveloped.

The Halifax Technical High School was formed in 1957. This was before its Moorbottom Road premises were completed and opened in May 1959 by the Vice-Chancellor of the University of Leeds. It had around 725 boys and girls. It became the Highlands School in 1969.

=== Amalgamation ===
The North Halifax High School was formed with the 1985 amalgamation of the Highlands Grammar School and the Princess Mary School. For the first two years of its existence, the new school operated on both sites (though they were four and a half miles apart); it was a matter of policy that (apart from the exam years whose courses obviously could not be disturbed) both sites should have a full age range of pupils, that classes should be mixed, and that all staff as far as possible should do some teaching at both sites. In 1987, when the intake was reduced to four streams (originally Princess Mary had had two, and The Highlands three) the whole school moved to the former Highlands School site. The school was grant-maintained in the early 1990s, being funded directly from the government rather than via the local authority. Around 1993/4 the school changed its name from North Halifax High School to North Halifax Grammar School (it had been selective before this). In 1999, the school became a foundation school, giving the governing body ownership of the buildings and site and expanded executive powers. After a long fundraising campaign, the school achieved Specialist Science College status in 2004, which funded the refurbishment and extension of existing laboratories and the construction of a new one. The previous headteacher, Graham Maslen, retired in September 2013.

== Performance ==
The school consistently achieves highly, being ranked the 10th best state school in the North of England by Parent Power 2019. The school also receives criticism, however, as it is one of the few "highly selective" schools in England taking just the top ten per cent of students based on the results of the Eleven plus exam. Absence is low, with the Department for Education reporting the school's non-authorised absence rate as negligible.

== Facilities ==
The North Halifax Grammar School consists of several different buildings, each of which houses the appropriate facilities for separate subjects. The main and largest building contains 8 English classrooms, 8 Mathematics classrooms, 2 Art classrooms, 2 ICT classrooms, the Gym, the Assembly Hall, the Cafeteria, 2 Music classrooms, 3 Geography classrooms, a Science Block, pastoral offices, a Design & Technology corridor that was renovated during the COVID-19 pandemic, Student Support classrooms for SEND students and a library. Additional buildings include the Graham Maslen Languages Centre, including six classrooms for Modern Foreign Languages and two classrooms for RE & PSHE. There is also the Enderby Wing, which is where three History classrooms can be found. In 2016, NHGS was granted £2.9 million for the construction of a new sports building, which now sits on the upper fields of the school. It has facilities such as a large sports hall, a small gym with new equipment, a dance studio, spacious changing rooms and classrooms available to the public to rent on weekends. There is one set of toilets for males, females and those with disabilities in each building. Within the school, there is an abundance of outdoor areas for students to stay in during breaktimes and lunchtimes. There is a multi-use games area (MUGA) where students can play football, basketball, netball, and rugby. During the summer, the school's two large fields are open to students in the Upper School. Students who do not wish to play ball games can stay in the East Wing Yard or in the outdoor space surrounding the languages centre or the science block where there are seating areas available.

== Extracurricular activities ==
In 2012, a Young Enterprise company from the school, "cloud-nine", won the Cisco Human Networking award for the United Kingdom.

== Notable former pupils ==
- Gary Fellows – Yorkshire cricketer
- Chris Illingworth – pianist
- Emma Williams – actress

=== The Highlands School ===
- Julie Kirkbride – Conservative MP for Bromsgrove from 1997–2010, and former Daily Telegraph journalist
- Richard Leishman, Olympic swimmer at the 1992 Olympics – still holds the 100m Butterfly junior record for English schools, set in 1983

=== The Princess Mary High School ===
- Phyllis Bentley OBE, novelist – wrote Inheritance
- Stella Robson, Chairman from 1998–2002 of the Northern Sinfonia, Mayor of Darlington from 2005–6
