= Phyllis Bentley =

English novelist (1894–1977)

Phyllis Bentley OBE FRSL
- Bentley in 1939
- Born: Phyllis Eleanor Bentley; 19 November 1894
- Died: 27 June 1977 (aged 82)
- Education: Cheltenham Ladies' College

Phyllis Eleanor Bentley (19 November 1894 – 27 June 1977) was an English novelist.

== Biography ==
The youngest child of a mill owner, she grew up in Halifax in the West Riding of Yorkshire and was educated at Halifax High School for Girls and Cheltenham Ladies' College. During World War I, she worked in the munitions industry. After the war, she returned to her native Halifax where she taught English and Latin.

In 1918, she published her first work, a collection of short stories entitled The World's Bane, after which she published several poor-selling novels until the publication in March 1932 of her best-known work, Inheritance, set against the background of the development of the textile industry in the West Riding, which received widespread critical acclaim and ran through twenty-three impressions by 1946, making her the first successful English regional novelist since Thomas Hardy had written his Wessex novels.

Bentley was a literary celebrity in the 1930s: in 1938, she gave the first in a series of "Manchester Celebrity Lectures" on the subject "Writing a novel".

Two further novels followed in 1946 and 1966, forming a trilogy, and in 1967 Inheritance was filmed by Granada TV, with John Thaw and James Bolam in leading roles. In 1968, she wrote the children's novel Gold Pieces, which is a fictionalised account, seen through the eyes of a 12-year-old boy, of the Cragg Coiners, who defrauded the government by clipping the edges of gold coins to melt down and make into new coins.

Bentley wrote 24 detective short stories featuring Miss Marian Phipps, beginning with "The Missing Character" for Woman's Home Companion in 1937 and continuing in Ellery Queen's Mystery Magazine from the early 1950s to the early 1970s. A collection appeared in book form in 2014.

In 1949, Bentley was awarded an honorary Doctor of Letters from Leeds University. In 1958, she became a Fellow of the Royal Society of Literature, and in 1970, she was appointed an OBE.

== Selected works ==
- 1918: The World's Bane (four allegorical stories)
- 1922: Environment (novel)
- 1923: Cat in the Manger (novel)
- 1928: The Spinner of the Years (novel)
- 1928: The Partnership (novel)
- 1929: Carr (novel)
- 1930: Trio (novel)
- 1932: Inheritance (novel)
- 1934: A Modern Tragedy (novel)
- 1935: The Whole of the Story (short stories)
- 1936: Freedom Farewell (study of the fall of Ancient Rome, her only fictional work not concerned with Yorkshire)
- 1941: Manhold (novel)
- 1942: The English Regional Novel
- 1945: We of the West Riding (scriptwriter)
- 1946: The Rise of Henry Morcar (novel) (part two of the Inheritance Trilogy)
- 1947: The Brontës (biography) (the English Novelists series)
- 1950: Quorum
- 1953: The House of Moreys (novel)
- 1954: The Coiners (televised play)
- 1955: Noble in Reason (novel)
- 1958: Crescendo (novel)
- 1960: The Young Brontës (biography)
- 1962: O Dreams O Destinations (autobiography)
- 1966: A Man of His Time (novel) (part three of the Inheritance Trilogy)
- 1968: Gold Pieces (children's novel)
- 1969: Ring in the New (update of the Inheritance Trilogy)
- 1969: The Brontës and Their World (biography)
- 1972: Sheep May Safely Graze (novel)
- 1974: Tales of West Riding (short stories)
- 2014: Chain of Witnesses, The Cases of Miss Phipps (short detective stories, published by Crippen & Landru)

In addition to her fiction works, her non-fiction work included scholarly works on the Brontë Sisters, the English woollen industry as well as West Riding history and topography.
