= Fountainhead Village =

Hamlet in West Yorkshire, England

Coordinates: 53.736°N 1.904°W

Fountainhead
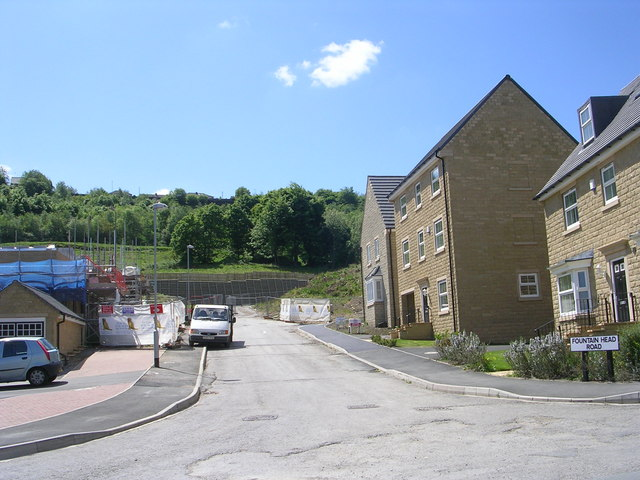
- Fountain Head Road

- Location within West Yorkshire
- Population: 800
- OS grid reference: SE065266
  - London: 171 mi (275 km) S
- Metropolitan borough: Calderdale
- Metropolitan county: West Yorkshire
- Region: Yorkshire and the Humber
- Country: England
- Sovereign state: United Kingdom
- Post town: Halifax
- Postcode district: HX2
- Dialling code: 01422
- Police: West Yorkshire
- Fire: West Yorkshire
- Ambulance: Yorkshire
- UK Parliament: Halifax

Fountainhead is a hamlet in Calderdale, West Yorkshire, England, built on the old site of the Webster's Brewery at the turn of the 21st century. It is situated approximately 2 miles (3 km) north-west from Halifax town centre. The hamlet is in the Warley ward of Calderdale.

Founded in 2004, developer David Wilson Homes started developing a new sustainable village on the brownfield site. Completed in 2018 with over 300 houses and an estimated population of 800, it has one public house, Long Can Hall, which has been used for filming Last Tango in Halifax.

The Maltings College opened in 2013 and offered a range of vocational sixth form courses until its closure in 2018. The former site was a nursery school until its closure in 2018. Subsequently, Trinity Multi Academy Trust took over the building as its administrative head office and training centre.

The village has two parks and backs onto Ovenden Wood and has beer-themed names for roads, such as Cask Court, Maltings Road, and Golding Hop Close.

The former professional rugby league footballer Wilf George lives in the village.

The hamlet is served by buses from Halifax bus station. The disused Halifax High-Level Railway skirts the northern end of the village, with the Signal View development area built on the site of the old Maltings Brewery Goods Yard.
