= Trinity Academy Cathedral =

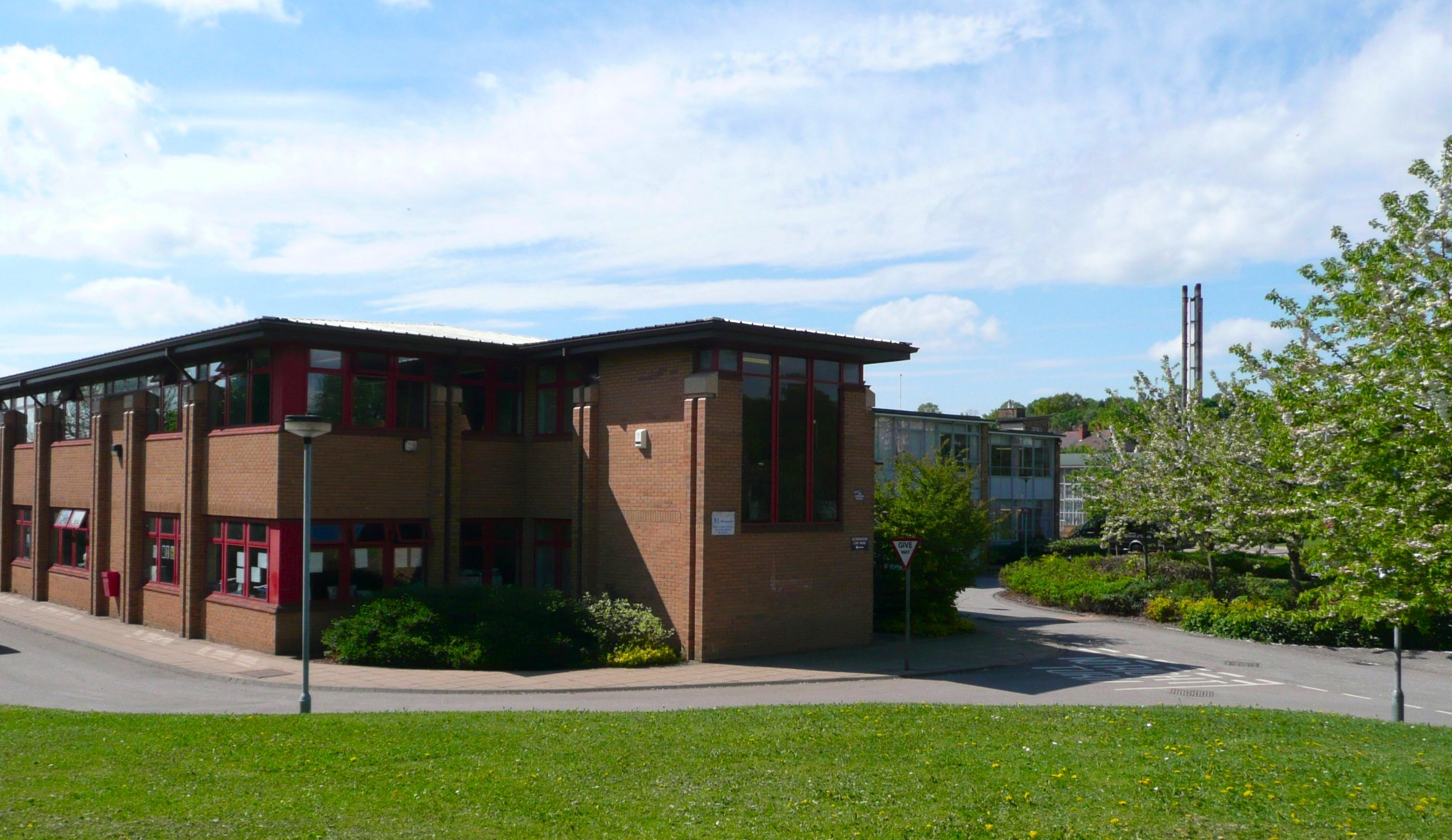

Location
- Thornes Road; Wakefield, Yorkshire, WF2 8QF; England
- Coordinates: 53.669686°N 1.515851°W

Information
- Type: Academy
- Motto: "Everything is possible for one who believes."
- Religious affiliation: Church of England
- Local authority: Wakefield
- Specialist: Arts College
- Department for Education URN: 145579 Tables
- Ofsted: Reports
- Chair of Governors: John Hanson
- Principal: Anna Gillinder
- Gender: Coeducational
- Age: 11 to 16
- Enrolment: 968 (2020-21)
- Website: https://cathedral.trinitymat.org

Trinity Academy Cathedral (formerly Cathedral Academy) is an 11-16 voluntary controlled Church of England secondary school. The school has places for 1050 students, and there were 968 pupils on the school roll in the school year 2020-21. The school is the only Church of England Secondary School in Wakefield.

== History ==
In 1953, a fire erupted at what was at the time, Thornes House, a Grammar School which contained campuses within Thornes Park. This fire was suspected to have been caused by a cigarette within the costume area controlled by the Wakefield Amateur Theatre Guild for a production of A Midsummer Night's Dream. The newer presently used buildings were constructed in 1956. In 1972, Thornes House renamed to Thornes House High School.

In 1992, it was proposed to merge Thornes House High School, which had by this point lost its sixth form status, with what was at the time, Cathedral Middle School (initially founded in 1987). This was done in order to form a Church controlled High School on the site of the former, Upon closure of Thornes House High School, the remaining campuses within Thornes Park were handed over to Wakefield College as their Sports and Fitness educational centre, with a Swimming Pool and other athletic facilities provided on-site.

On 31 August 1993, Cathedral Middle School became Cathedral High School, and remained under this name until 2007, when the school rebranded under the leadership of headmaster Paul West, as Cathedral School of the Performing Arts. In 2012, they were awarded Academy status for their Performing Arts achievements within high-school ages. It was at this time, which CAPA opened to students aged 16–18 and became renowned across the UK as one of the leading schools for Performing Arts. Once again, on 1 January 2012, the school was renamed as Cathedral Academy under the leadership of then Principal, Tay Warren.

On 1 March 2018, the school closed, and reopened with a new unique identifier number of 145579. The Department of Education website cites the reason as being a "new start", with Trinity Academy Trust being listed as the Academy Trustee, and Trinity Academy Halifax being listed as the school's Academic sponsors.

On 1 January 2021, the name of the school changed to Trinity Academy Cathedral.

== Curriculum ==
Students aged 11–13 are required to learn English, Maths, Science, PE, French, History, Geography, Art, ICT, Music and Drama, in addition to lessons provided by one of two pathways, including Technology (Cathedral pathway), and Performing Arts (CAPA Juniors Pathway). Students aged 13+ are required to study for GCSEs in Maths, English (x2), Science (x2 or x3 depending on academic status and/or the pathway they are on). Students can also choose two to three optional subjects to study for GCSE/BTEC qualifications, including options from Dance, Drama, Music, ICT, Finance/Business, Art, Food, Sport and PE.

== Ofsted ==
The latest Ofsted inspection in May 2022 rated the school as "Outstanding" in every category.

In the report the inspectors commented that our academy is a school with "a very special atmosphere and sense of purpose", going on to say that "pupils have access to a high quality, knowledge-rich curriculum" and that there are "very high standards of pupil behaviour". They said that the school's "approach to the personal development of pupils is exemplary. Their vision for all pupils to have belief in themselves, and to develop strong character traits, is embedded in the day-to-day offer" and also that there is "a meticulous culture of vigilance across all aspects of safeguarding".

This latest Ofsted report highlights the transformation of the school which coincides with the Trinity multi-academy Trust taking over in 2016. The previous Ofsted inspection completed in November 2016 had concluded that the school was "in need of improvement".

== SIAMS inspection ==
The school is Wakefield's only Church of England secondary school and was judged in its Statutory Inspection of Anglican and Methodist Schools (SIAMS) inspection in 2020 to be "Excellent" in both having an effective Christian vision which enables pupils and adults to flourish, and in the impact of collective worship.

== Former Headteachers ==
- Allan Yellup (2001 - acting). Was also at the same time, headteacher of Wakefield City Academy.
- Paul West (2005–2010)
- Tay Warren (2010–2016)
- Rob Marsh (2016-2023)
- Anna Gillinder (2023–present)
