= The Maltings College =

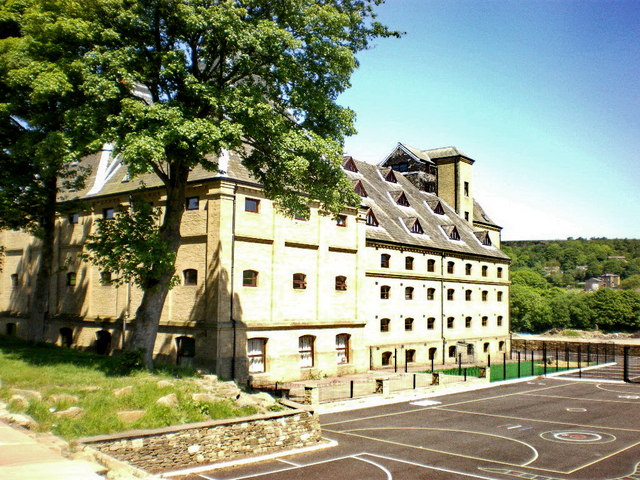
- The building in 2009, before establishment of the college

Location
- The Maltings College; Halifax; West Yorkshire, HX2 0TJ; England; 53.7378°N 1.9003°W

Information
- Type: Free school sixth form
- Established: 2 September 2013
- Local authority: Calderdale
- Department for Education URN: 139433 Tables
- Ofsted: Reports
- Gender: Mixed
- Age: 16 to 19
- Website: http://www.maltingscollege.co.uk/

The Maltings College was a free school sixth form in Fountainhead, near Halifax, West Yorkshire, England.

Established in 2013, The Maltings College is located at the former site of Webster's Brewery. Until its closure in 2018, the college offers a range of vocational qualifications at levels 1 to 3. Areas of instruction include:

- Barbering
- Beauty therapy
- Business
- Catering
- Childcare
- Hairdressing
- Health and social care
- IT betworking
- Motor vehicle maintenance
- Sport
