= Mixenden =

Village in West Yorkshire, England

Coordinates: 53.759°N 1.904°W

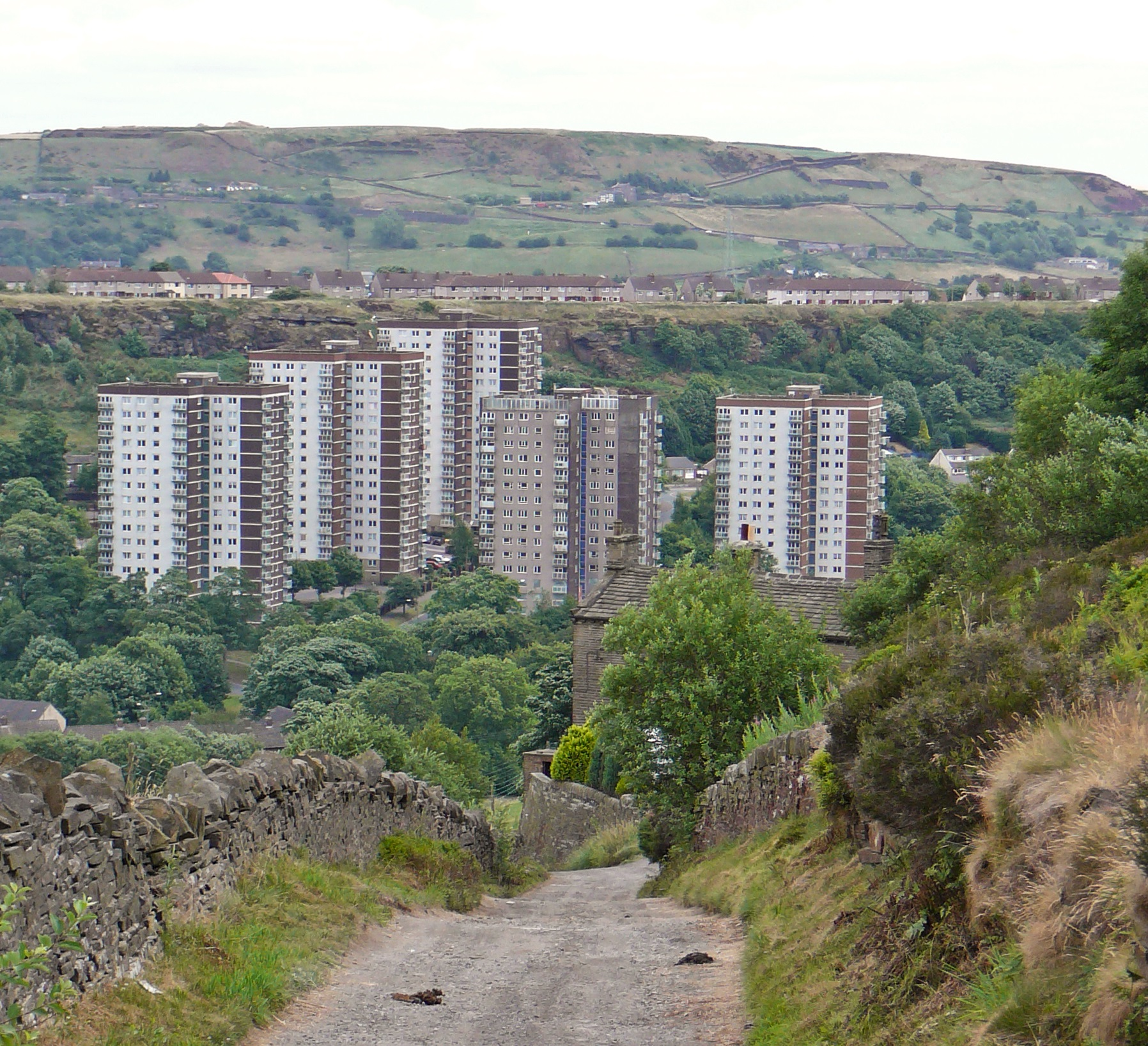
- Mixenden Tower Blocks

- Location within West Yorkshire
- Population: 12,739 (Ward. Illingworth and Mixenden. 2011)
- OS grid reference: SE061284
  - London: 170 mi (270 km) SSE
- Metropolitan borough: Calderdale
- Metropolitan county: West Yorkshire
- Region: Yorkshire and the Humber
- Country: England
- Sovereign state: United Kingdom
- Post town: HALIFAX
- Postcode district: HX2
- Dialling code: 01422
- Police: West Yorkshire
- Fire: West Yorkshire
- Ambulance: Yorkshire
- UK Parliament: Halifax

Mixenden is a district of Halifax, Calderdale, in the county of West Yorkshire, England. It lies on the outskirts of the town.

The name Mixenden derives from the Anglo Saxon 'mixen' (compost or dung heap) and 'den' usually refers to pasture land, usually for pigs.

== History ==
During the 1970s, after the building of tower blocks in Mixenden, social problems and unemployment led to a tarnished reputation. Although much has been done to regenerate the area, its isolation from other neighbourhoods and its position, 3 miles (5 km) north-west of Halifax, continues to contribute to a social separation from the rest of Calderdale.

Currently in Mixenden there is a primary school split across two sites, three newsagents with off licences, one launderette, one fish and chip shop, two pizza/Indian takeaways, one Chinese takeaway, two sandwich shops, a library, a council-funded activity centre and a doctors' surgery (Caritas Group Practice Mixenden).

There are also numerous public children's play areas that are maintained by Calderdale Council.

== Mixenden Reservoir ==
To the north-west of the village is a large reservoir that is maintained by Yorkshire Water.

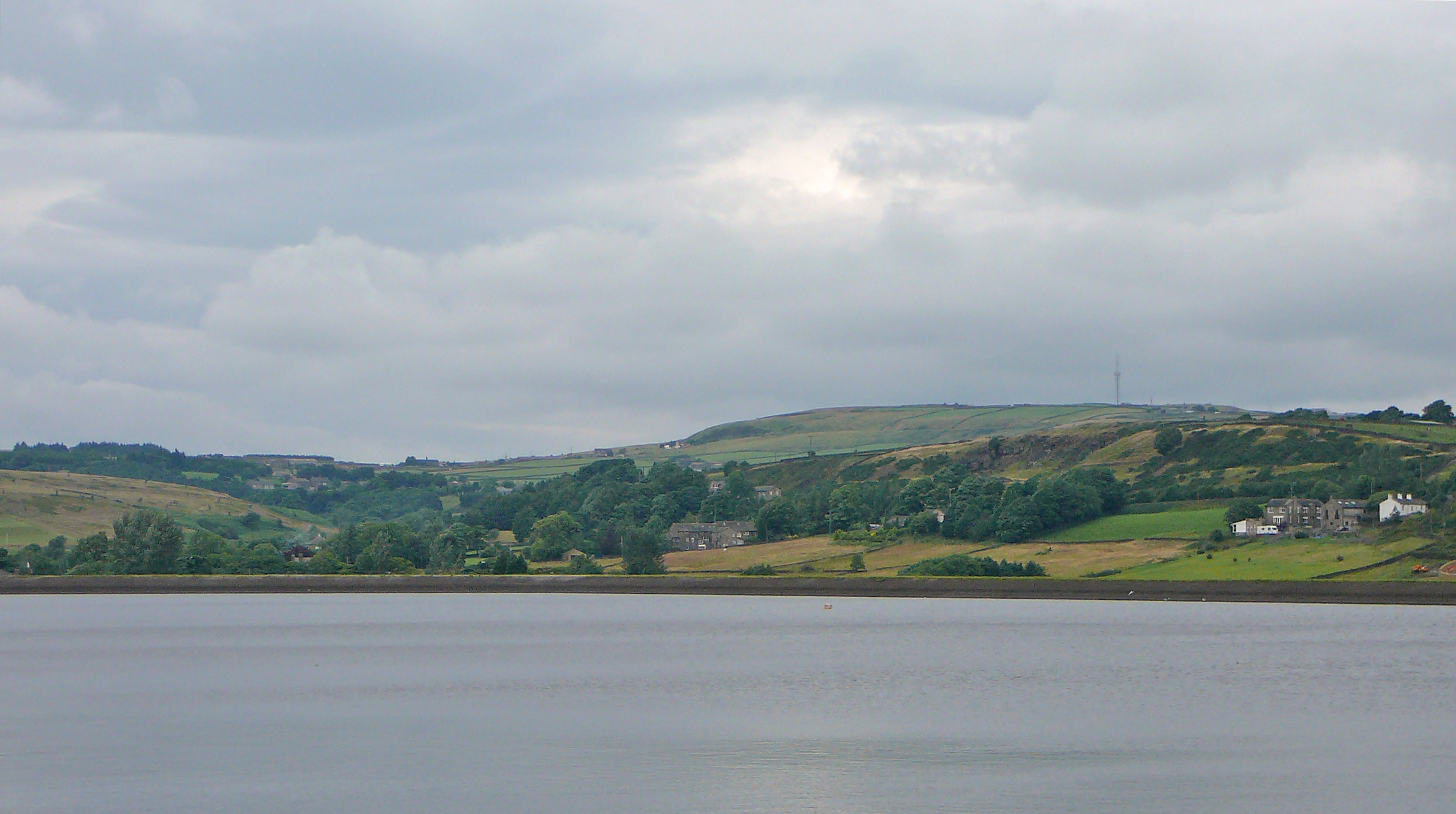
Mixenden Reservoir

== See also ==
- Listed buildings in Illingworth, West Yorkshire and Mixenden
