= Thick as Thieves (TV series) =

1974 ITV television series

- Main title
- Created by: Dick Clement and Ian La Frenais
- Written by: Dick Clement and Ian La Frenais
- Directed by: Mike Gibbon; Derrick Goodwin
- Starring: Bob Hoskins; John Thaw; Pat Ashton; Michael Robbins; Johnny Briggs
- Country of origin: United Kingdom
- Original language: English
- No. of episodes: 8

Production
- Producer: Derrick Goodwin
- Running time: 25 minutes
- Production company: London Weekend

Original release
- Network: ITV
- Release: 1 June – 20 July 1974

Thick as Thieves is a British sitcom which was broadcast on ITV between 1 June and 20 July 1974 and produced by London Weekend. It was created and written by Dick Clement and Ian La Frenais. There were eight episodes over one series and starred Bob Hoskins, John Thaw and Pat Ashton.

== Synopsis ==
The plot revolves mainly around George (Bob Hoskins), whose last job as a house burglar ended up with his getting sent to prison. After three long years, he returns to his home and wife Annie (Pat Ashton), only to find everything is not quite as he left it. His best friend Stan (John Thaw) moved into George's house with his wife eight months previously. This was the moment Annie and Stan were dreading, but when it came to the crunch she found she not only loved Stan, but also still loved husband George. Confused, and not helped by George's perhaps understandable annoyance at the situation, she finds she is unable to decide which will stay and which will go. As the series moves on the answer to the trio's problems doesn't get any clearer.

== Cast ==
=== Main ===
- Bob Hoskins as George
- John Thaw as Stan
- Pat Ashton as Annie

=== Recurring ===
- Johnny Briggs as Spiggy
- Michael Robbins as Sergeant Black
- Reg Lye as Norman

== Background ==
Dick Clement and Ian La Frenais had written the successful sitcom Whatever Happened to the Likely Lads? (sequel to their 1960s series, The Likely Lads). They contributed two scripts to Seven of One in 1973, a series of seven individual situation comedy starring Ronnie Barker, with "Prisoner And Escort", serving as the pilot for Porridge and “I’ll Fly You For A Quid”.. Meanwhile, they developed Thick As Thieves for London Weekend, the ITV contractor.

== Production ==
External scenes were kept to a minimum, mainly for setting the scene, or as a short linking sequence. Where used, these sequences were on videotape instead of film, this was usual practice for ITV sitcoms in the 1970s, unlike the BBC which used film. Film was used for the sequences used behind the opening and closing titles each week. Clement and La Frenais allowed individual plot threads in Thick As Thieves to cross between successive episodes, meaning the series must be run in its serial-like series running order for some of the plotlines to make sense.

The series was moderately successful, but London Weekend Television declined a second series.

== Episodes ==
=== Episode 1 – "The Home Coming" (1 June 1974) ===
George Dobbs is released from a three-year sentence but no-one welcomes him at the prison gates. He seeks out his best mate, the womanizing Stan, to have a drink with, only to be told that Stan has moved on. The truth is that Stan moved in with Annie eight months ago, originally for company but they became romantically involved. George does not duff up Stan as expected but tells his friend to move out. In the process Stan falls downstairs and no-one believes George didn't do it for real.

=== Episode 2 – "Happy Release" (8 June 1974) ===
Stan is laid up in George's bed, claiming he cannot be moved while Annie cooks him a hearty breakfast. George can have a cuppa if he gets his own cup. Stan's taking advantage of George's soft nature by playing sick comes to an end when he is found creeping round the kitchen.

=== Episode 3 – "Good Conduct" (15 June 1974) ===
George is having a long hard think while walking along the Thames when he comes upon a group of youths trying to save their friend from the river. In a moment of heroism he saves the drowning boy and goes home, claiming his dampness was caused by his doing himself in. The lies start when Sergeant Black knocks on their door and in the face of initially stiff opposition reveals George is actually a bit of a local celebrity but from here the deceit only gets worse.

=== Episode 4 – "Two Men in My Life" (22 June 1974) ===
George and Stan have Annie losing her patience and walking out on both of them to stay with a friend and think things through. The pair of failed burglars have to work together to keep their house in order. The potentially gruelling housework is possibly the worst domestic nightmare they have faced so far, perhaps ever.

=== Episode 5 – "The Trouble with Tommy" (29 June 1974) ===
Tommy is an escaped felon whom police have narrowed the search for to the local area, so it's no surprise when he arrives and makes himself more than at home, ordering a string of demands that tests both George and Stan to the limit. However, thanks to Tommy's violent reputation there's little either can do about it. If three's a crowd, Annie's unexpected return proves that four's a catastrophe.

=== Episode 6 – "Three Into Two Won't Go" (6 July 1974) ===
George has slowly resigned himself to the current domestic situation with himself, Annie and Stan. George discovers that Annie has planned a holiday to Benidorm - with Stan. The ensuing arguments cause so much friction that George thinks about booking his own holiday but instead only succeeds in letting Annie and her girlfriend take both tickets while the two boys slum it out at home.

=== Episode 7 – "Home & Away" (13 July 1974) ===
With Annie away in Benidorm for a holiday with her friend, George and Stan make a decent fist of keeping the home in good order and clean, even learning not to burn their dinner along the way. However the cat's away, so a couple of strays start sniffing out the territory - and the two boys feel that they must rise to the challenge. Any chance of one-upmanship when Annie returns home are dashed by their respective dates still hanging around.

=== Episode 8 – "Holy Deadlock" (20 July 1974) ===
Annie may have double the trouble with two men at her beck and call - nearly - but for this she has sacrificed the other luxuries life has to offer. She stops short of saying she wants them to start stealing stuff again. Instead, competing against each other to vie for Annies' affections, both men independently decide to secretly get some loot in - both by doing a house over. Except that they both choose the same house at the same time, and their collective talents are going to be no match against its owner - the girlfriend of the local gangland boss.

== Theme music ==
The theme music was written by Mike Hugg and Ian La Frenais, and was reminiscent of the theme for Whatever Happened to the Likely Lads?, which was also penned by Clement and La Frenais. The theme song, "Do The Best You Can", was released on 7" single in 1974 by Fontana Records (6007 037). The group's name was Porridge and it was produced by Hugg and Heath-Hadfield for Flanelcat Productions. The B-side was "Look At Yourself", also written by Hugg and La Frenais.
