= Dead Man's Chest (1965 film) =

1965 British film by Patrick Dromgoole

- Theatrical release poster
- Directed by: Patrick Dromgoole
- Screenplay by: Donal Giltinan
- Produced by: Jack Greenwood
- Starring: John Thaw; Ann Firbank; John Meillon
- Edited by: Derek Holding
- Music by: Bernard Ebbinghouse
- Production company: Merton Park Studios
- Distributed by: Anglo-Amalgamated
- Release date: 1965
- Running time: 59 minutes
- Country: United Kingdom
- Language: English

Dead Man's Chest is a 1965 British second feature film directed by Patrick Dromgoole and starring John Thaw, Ann Firbank and John Meillon. It is part of the series of Edgar Wallace Mysteries films made at Merton Park Studios.

== Plot ==
Hard-up journalists David Jones and Johnnie Gordon decide to play a hoax, faking a murder to highlight the danger of circumstantial evidence in the criminal justice system, hiding Gordon's apparently dead body in a wooden chest. But things go terribly wrong when their car is stolen, with the wooden chest inside. Panicking that Gordon will suffocate, Jones goes to the police, who think the entire story is a lie. They find the circumstantial evidence deliberately planted by Jones and Gordon as part of their original plan, and Jones is arrested for murder. Jones's wife goes to Scotland in search of Gordon's girlfriend and through her finds Gordon in hiding, working in a hotel. Jones is released.

== Cast ==
- John Thaw as David Jones
- Ann Firbank as Mildred Jones
- John Meillon as Johnnie Gordon
- John Collin as Det. Insp. Briggs
- Peter Bowles, John Abineri and Jack Rodney as Joe, Arthur and Knocker, the car thieves.
- Arthur Brough as Groves, Jones' landlord.
- Graham Crowden as Murchie, a newspaper editor.
- Renny Lister as Flora, Gordon's girlfriend.
- Geoffrey Bayldon as Lane, a lawyer.
- Michael Robbins as Sgt. Harris
- Victor Platt as Constable Jackson
- Michael Collins as Sgt. Matson
- Geoffrey Mathews as prison warder
- Charlie Bird as prison warder
- Paul Whitsun-Jones as chef

== Critical reception ==
The Monthly Film Bulletin wrote: "Competently acted and presented, this B picture impresses most through Donal Giltinan's quite inventive though highly improbable story, which manages to keep the fairly intricate plot unentangled, even if there is something a little glib about the ending. An unambitious but efficient little film of its class."
