= Holdsworth House =

Mansion in Halifax, England

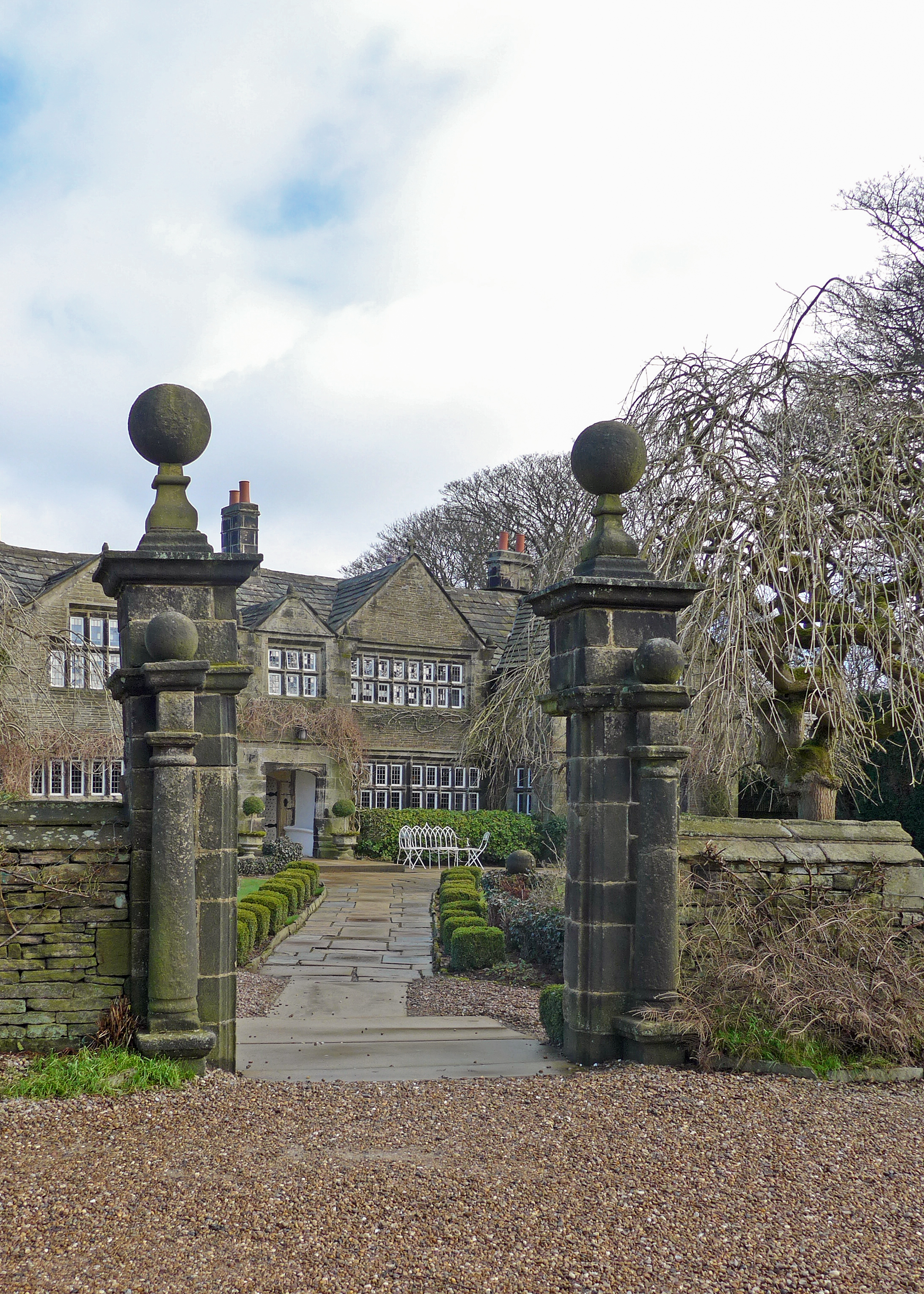
- Holdsworth House with gate posts in the foreground

- Location within West Yorkshire
- Hotel chain: Independent

General information
- Architectural style: Jacobean
- Location: Halifax, West Yorkshire, England
- Coordinates: 53°45′28″N 1°52′31″W
- Completed: 1633

Other information
- Number of rooms: 36

Holdsworth House is a Grade II* listed building at Holdsworth in Halifax, West Yorkshire, England. Built in 1633, it is a Jacobean mansion built in sandstone with narrow, leaded windows.

== Hotel ==
Holdsworth House is currently used as a four star hotel with 36 rooms. The restaurant was given a two rosette rating by The Automobile Association.

=== Famous guests ===
The Beatles stayed at Holdsworth House in 1964, when the property was known as The Cavalier Country Club, before it was a hotel.

Jayne Mansfield stayed at Holdsworth House in 1967 when she was booked to play at the Batley Variety Club.

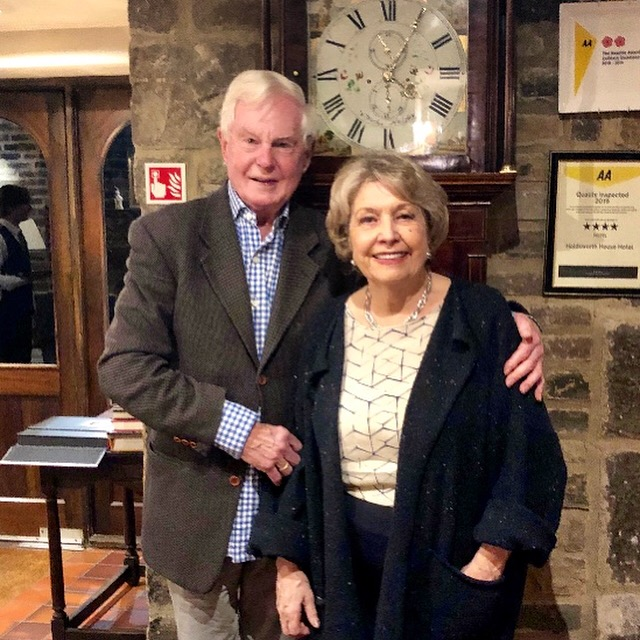
Sir Derek Jacobi and Anne Reid in the reception lobby at Holdsworth House in Halifax, whilst in the area filming 'Last Tango in Halifax' in 2019

Sir Derek Jacobi and Anne Reid stayed whilst filming the BBC TV show Last Tango in Halifax

Suranne Jones visited and Gemma Jones stayed at Holdsworth House in 2019 during filming of the joint HBO and BBC TV series Gentleman Jack at nearby Shibden Hall.

== History ==
The present house may have been built in 1598 although the date stone above the front porch bears the initials and date A.B. 1633. Abraham Brigg owned the manor about this time but according to one historian he is unlikely to have built it. He is said to have wasted his estate and given way to drink. In 1657 he sold it to Henry Wadsworth of Peacock House, Warley. The Wadsworth family owned the property for more than two hundred years, until 1895.

Although Henry Wadsworth owned Holdsworth House from 1657 he retained his residence in Warley where he died in 1671. The next residents were John and Deborah Wadsworth who carved their initials with the date 1680 on the west porch. They lived at the house for over 30 years. There is a memorial in Halifax Church which is dedicated to them. John died in 1715.

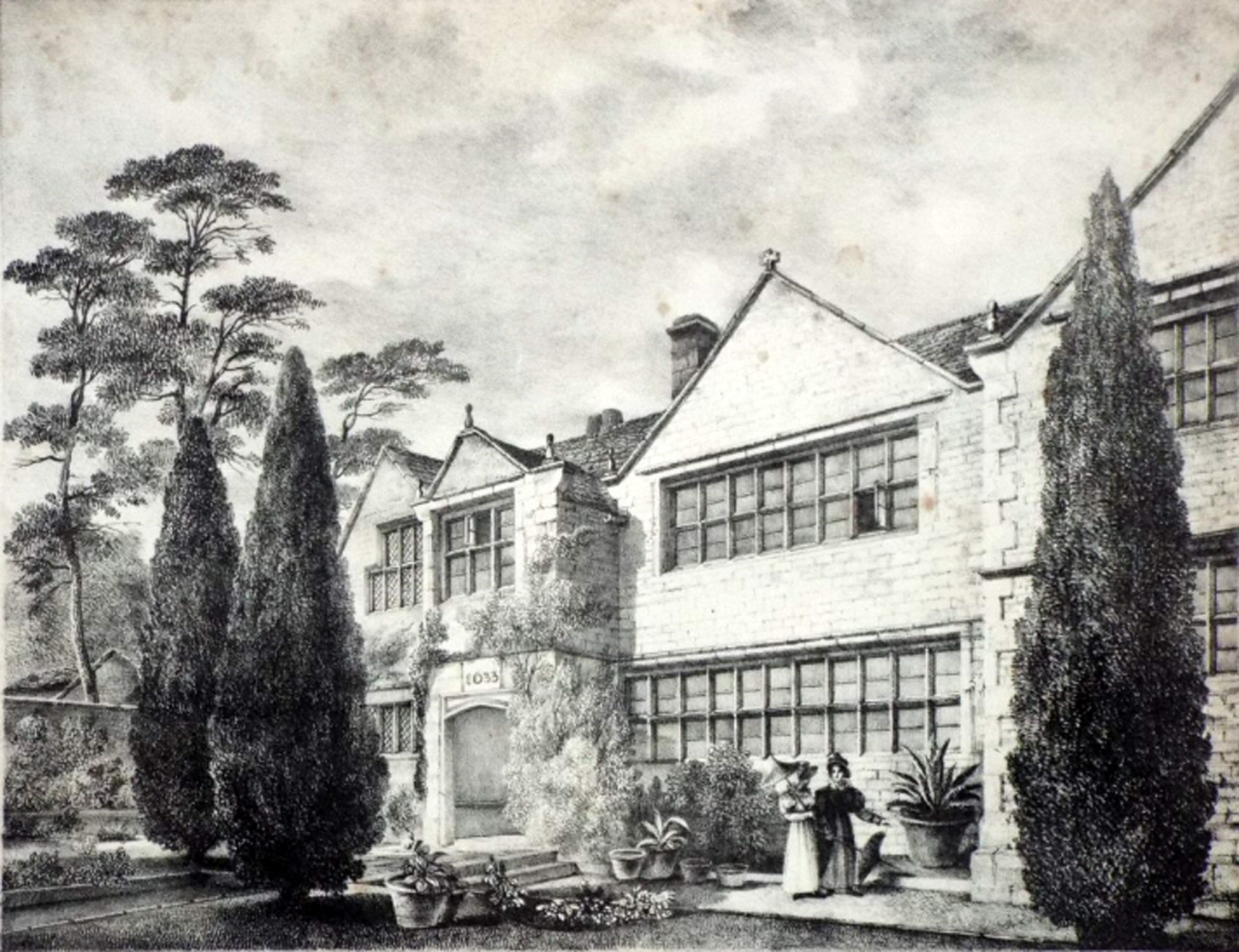
Engraving of Holdsworth House in 1835

Their son Henry Wadsworth inherited the house. He and his wife Mary lived there for many years. She died in 1745 and after Henry died in 1765 his son Reverend John Wadsworth became the owner. He had several children all of whom except one died before 1800. The surviving child was Elizabeth Wadsworth, who was known to be generous to the poor and founded the Popples Almshouses and School, which since became Bradshaw Primary School. She also helped fund and make plans for the foundation of St John’s Church, Bradshaw. She died in 1837. She was the last surviving Wadsworth so she left her estate to a distant relative Matthew Henry Ayrton. Matthew Henry Ayrton upon inheriting the Wadsworth estates was required as a condition to assume their name which he did in 1840 to become Matthew Henry Wadsworth. He died in 1860 and his eldest son John Henry Wadsworth inherited the house. In 1870 John who was an architect married Annie Eliza Hodgson and the couple had two sons. Unfortunately John died in 1877 at the age of only 27. Annie Eliza decided to rent the house and move to smaller accommodation. One of the tenants was Henry Edwin Moore who was a Professor of Music. He lived at the house from about 1885 until about 1905.

In 1895 Annie Eliza Wadsworth died and the family sold the house to Richard Ayrton Woodhead. He did not live at the house but instead continued to lease it. He died in 1901 and his son Sidney Woodhead inherited the property. In about 1910 Norman Scott Crawshaw rented the house and in 1921 he bought it. He continued to live there until about 1935 when it was bought by Thomas Ashworth Hoyle.

Thomas Ashworth Hoyle was born in 1905. In 1932 he bought the textile firm James Acroyd and Sons. In the next year he married Marjorie Ayrton Broadhead but unfortunately she died in 1937. In 1938 he married Hazel Smith daughter of Samuel Smith of Manor Holme, Halifax. The Hoyle family lived at Holdsworth House until about 1962 when it was bought by the Pearson family who still own the property, which is no longer a private house but a hotel and restaurant.

== Depictions in the media ==
The house has been used as a television setting including for Jamie Oliver, and Last Tango in Halifax.

In 2012 The BBC filmed a feature for The One Show, hosted by Gyles Brandreth The feature was about the overnight stay of Jayne Mansfield in 1967, when she was booked to star at Batley Variety Club.

In 2019 an antique from the Mullioned Restaurant at Holdsworth House appeared on the BBC's Antiques Roadshow.

The hotel has appeared in Channel 4's Ackley Bridge TV drama, which was mostly filmed across the road at the former St Catherine's School
