= Michael Goodliffe =

English actor (1914–1976)

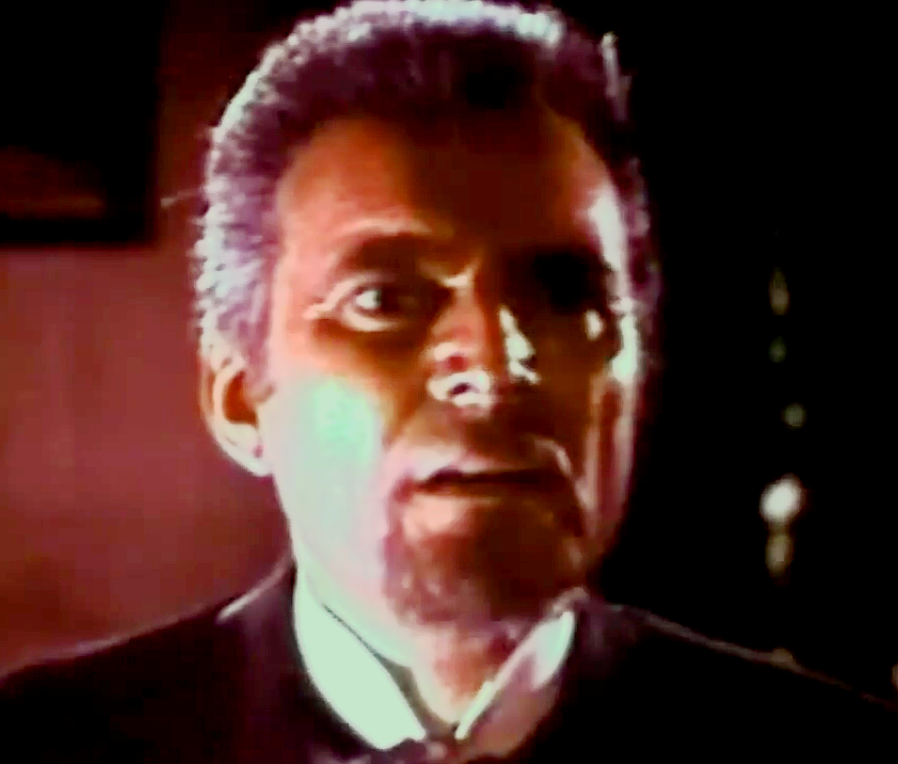
- Goodliffe in The Gorgon (1964)
- Born: Lawrence Michael Andrew Goodliffe; 1 October 1914; Bebington, Cheshire, England
- Died: 20 March 1976 (aged 61); Wimbledon, London, England
- Years active: 1936–1976
- Spouse: Dorothy Tyndale (m. 1945)
- Children: 3

Painting of Goodliffe as Hamlet, a role he performed while a prisoner of war in Germany

Lawrence Michael Andrew Goodliffe (1 October 1914 – 20 March 1976) was an English actor known for playing suave roles such as doctors, lawyers and army officers. He was also sometimes cast in working-class parts.

== Early life ==
Goodliffe was born in Bebington, Wirral, the son of a vicar, and educated at St Edmund's School, Canterbury, and Keble College, Oxford.

== Career ==
Goodliffe began his career in repertory theatre in Liverpool before joining the company of the Stratford Memorial Theatre in Stratford upon Avon. He joined the British Army at the beginning of the Second World War, and received a commission as a second lieutenant in the Royal Warwickshire Regiment in February 1940. He was wounded in the leg and captured at the Battle of Dunkirk. Goodliffe was incorrectly listed as killed in action, and even had his obituary published in a newspaper. He was to spend the rest of the war a prisoner in Germany.

Whilst in captivity he produced and acted in (and in some cases wrote) many plays and sketches to entertain fellow prisoners. These included two productions of William Shakespeare's Hamlet, one in Tittmoning and the other in Eichstätt, in which he played the title role. He also produced the first staging of Noël Coward's Post-Mortem at Eichstätt. A full photographic record of these productions exists.

After the war, he resumed his professional acting career. As well as appearing in the theatre, he worked in film and television. He appeared in The Wooden Horse (1950) and in other POW films. His best-known film was A Night to Remember (1958), in which he played Thomas Andrews, designer of the RMS Titanic. His best-known television series was Sam (1973–75) in which he played an unemployed Yorkshire miner. He also appeared with John Thaw and James Bolam in the 1967 television series Inheritance, and played Sir Thomas More in the 1972 BBC TV series The Six Wives of Henry VIII.

== Death ==
Suffering from depression, Goodliffe had a breakdown in 1976 during the period that he was rehearsing for a revival of Equus. He died by suicide a few days later by leaping from a hospital fire escape while he was a patient at the Atkinson Morley Hospital in Wimbledon, which has since been converted to residential use and is now called 'Wimbledon Hill Park'.

== Filmography ==
- The Small Back Room (1949) as Till
- Stop Press Girl (1949) as McPherson
- The Wooden Horse (1950) as Robbie
- Captain Horatio Hornblower (1951) as Col. Caillard – POW Escort
- Cry, the Beloved Country (1951) as Martens
- The Hour of 13 (1952) as Anderson
- Sea Devils (1953) as Ragan
- Rob Roy, the Highland Rogue (1953) as Robert Walpole
- Front Page Story (1954) as Kennedy
- John Wesley (1954)
- The Crowded Day (1954) as Eve's Husband
- The End of the Affair (1955) as Smythe
- The Adventures of Quentin Durward (1955) as Count De Dunois
- The Way Out (1955) as John Moffat
- Wicked as They Come (1956) as Larry Buckham
- The Battle of the River Plate (1956) as Captain McCall – R.N., British Naval Attache for Buenos Aires
- Fortune Is a Woman (1957) as Detective Insp. Barnes
- The One That Got Away (1957) as R.A.F. Interrogator
- Carve Her Name With Pride (1958) as Coding Expert
- The Camp on Blood Island (1958) as Father Paul Anjou
- Up the Creek (1958) as Nelson
- A Night to Remember (1958) as shipbuilder Thomas Andrews
- Three Crooked Men (1958) as Shop customer
- Further Up the Creek (1958) as Le. Commander Blakeney
- The 39 Steps (1959) as Brown
- The White Trap (1959) as Inspector Walters
- Sink the Bismarck! (1960) as Captain Banister
- Testament of Orpheus (1960) as English narrator (voice, uncredited)
- The Battle of the Sexes (1960) as Detective
- Conspiracy of Hearts (1960) as Father Desmaines
- Peeping Tom (1960) as Don Jarvis
- The Trials of Oscar Wilde (1960) as Charles Gill
- No Love for Johnnie (1961) as Dr. West
- The Day the Earth Caught Fire (1961) as 'Jacko' Jackson – Night Editor
- Jigsaw (1962) as Clyde Burchard
- 80,000 Suspects (1963) as Clifford Preston
- A Stitch in Time (1963) as Doctor on Children's Ward (uncredited)
- Man in the Middle (1963) as Col. Shaw
- Woman of Straw (1964) as Solicitor (uncredited)
- 633 Squadron (1964) as Squadron Leader Frank Adams
- The 7th Dawn (1964) as Trumphey
- The Gorgon (1964) as Professor Jules Heitz
- Troubled Waters (1964) as Jeff Driscoll
- Von Ryan's Express (1965) as Captain Stein
- The Night of the Generals (1967) as Hauser
- The Jokers (1967) as Lt. Col. Paling
- The Fixer (1968) as Ostrovsky
- Cromwell (1970) as Solicitor General
- The Fifth Day of Peace (1970) as Gen. Snow
- Willy Wonka and the Chocolate Factory (1971) as Mr. Teevee (uncredited)
- The Johnstown Monster (1971) as McNeil
- Henry VIII and His Six Wives (1972) as Thomas More
- Hitler: The Last Ten Days (1973) as Gen. Helmuth Weidling
- The Man with the Golden Gun (1974) as Bill Tanner, Chief of Staff (uncredited)
- To the Devil a Daughter (1976) as George de Grass

== Television ==
Year	Title	Role	Notes
1955	The Lark play by Jean Anouilh	The inquisitor	BBC Sunday Night Theatre
1957	The Adventures of Peter Simple	Peter's Uncle	4 episodes
1963	Maigret	Dr Javet	Episode: Maigret's Little Joke
1962	The Edgar Wallace Mystery Theatre	Sir Harold Trevitt	Episode: "The £20,000 Kiss"
1962	The Edgar Wallace Mystery Theatre	Detective Superintendent Hallett	Episode: "Number Six"
1963	The Saint	Dr. Quintus	Episode 2: "The Invisible Millionaire"
1965	The Avengers	Professor Keller	Episode 23: "The House That Jack Built"
1967	Inheritance	William Oldroyd	10 Episodes
1969	Callan	Hunter	5 Episodes (Series 2)
1969	Judge Dee	Judge Dee	6 Episodes
1969	Randall & Hopkirk (Deceased)	Arthur de Crecy	Episode 13: "But What a Sweet Little Room"
1970	The Woodlanders (BBC Series – lost)	George Melbury	? Episodes
1971	Hadleigh	Dr. John Salter	Episode: "Exposure"
1971	Hine	Sir Christopher Pendle	3 episodes
1973	Sam	Jack Barraclough	39 episodes
