= Webster's Brewery =

Brewery in Halifax, West Yorkshire, England

- Company type: Brewery
- Industry: Brewing
- Founded: 1838
- Founder: Samuel Webster
- Defunct: 1996 (brewery) Brands ongoing
- Headquarters: Halifax, West Yorkshire, England
- Area served: United Kingdom
- Products: Pale ale, stout, lager
- Production output: 1.3 million barrel brewery capacity (included lager and Wilsons production (1990)); 40,000 barrels (2007)
- Revenue: £100 million (1990)
- Owner: Silvan Brands Ltd
- Number of employees: ~600 (1982)

Webster's Brewery (Samuel Webster & Sons Ltd) was a brewery founded in 1838 by Samuel Webster which operated at the Fountain Head Brewery in Halifax, West Yorkshire, England. Webster's Green Label, a light mild, and Yorkshire Bitter gained national distribution after the company was taken over by Watney Mann in 1972. Throughout the 1970s it was known for the advertising slogan: "Drives out the northern thirst".

The brewery was closed with the loss of 400 jobs in 1996. Following its acquisition by Courage Brewery in 1990, Courage moved operations to Berkshire brewery as they bought the brewery to obtain the Budweiser and Holsten pils packaging contracts. After the brewery's closure, Webster's beers were initially brewed at the John Smith's Brewery in Tadcaster before moving to the Thomas Hardy Brewery at Burtonwood in 2004. Silvan Brands have owned the company since 2003 when they acquired it from Scottish & Newcastle.

== History ==
=== Origins: 1838–1900 ===
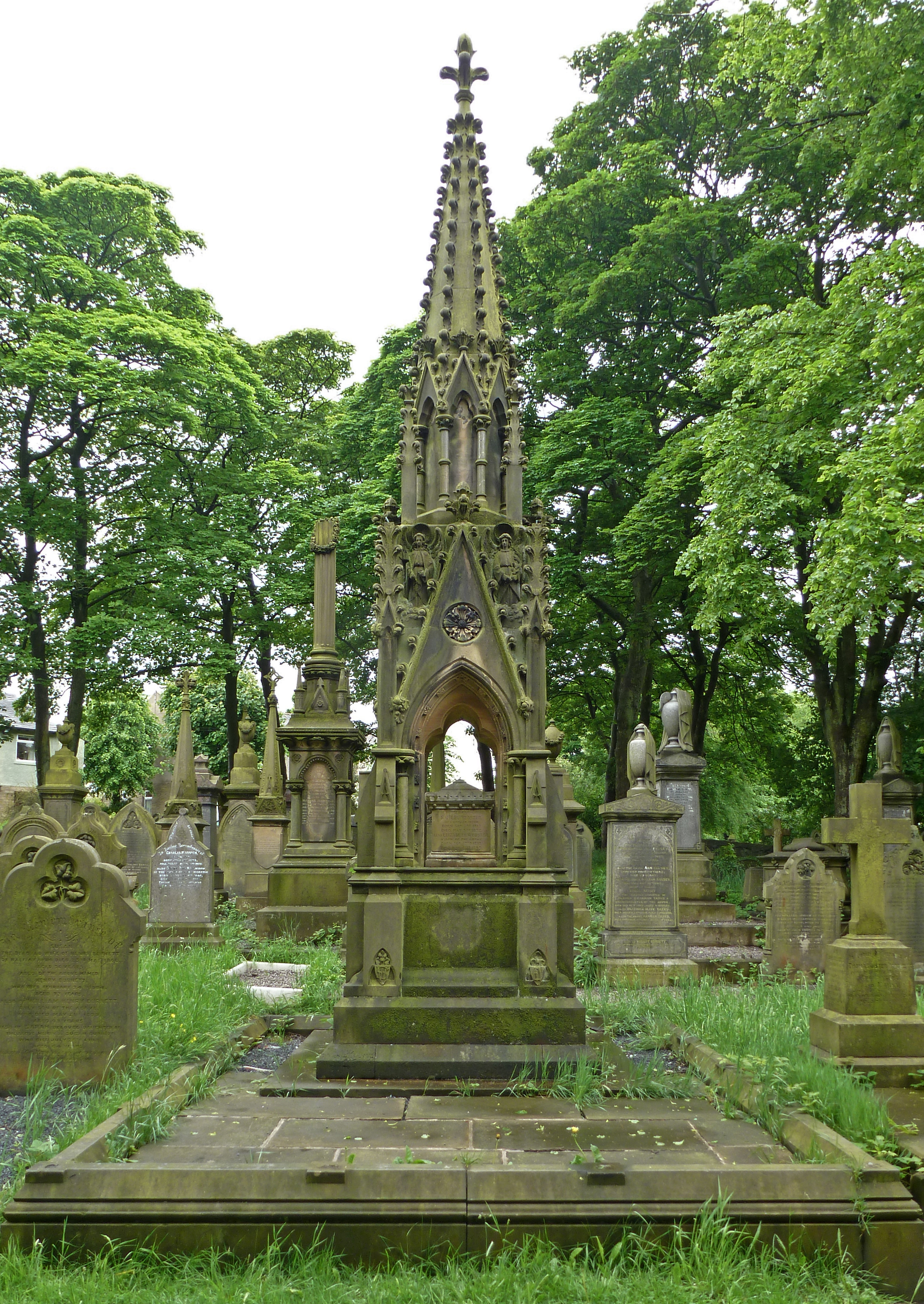
The grave of Samuel Webster near Halifax

Samuel Webster (1813–1872) was born in Ovenden, a small village about 2 miles from Halifax town centre. He was the eldest of seven brothers born into a Congregationalist family of the 10 acre-owning farmer James Webster. Webster acquired the small Fountain Head Brewery in Ovenden Wood in 1838 when he was 25 and opened an office in Union Cross Yard, Halifax. The company bought its first public house in 1845. In 1860 he was joined in partnership by his three sons Isaac, George Henry and Samuel Green, and the firm began trading as Samuel Webster & Sons. Samuel Webster died in 1872, leaving his sons to continue the business. The firm also imported and sold wines and cigars, in addition to its brewing concerns.

By 1880 the company had 100 tied houses. In March 1890 Samuel Webster & Sons became a registered company with £175,000 (£17.5 million in 2010) of capital and Isaac Webster, Samuel's eldest son, its first chairman. In 1892 net profit was £20,000 (£2 million in 2010). In 1896 the company took over H & T T Ormerod of Brighouse, West Yorkshire which could trace its origins back to 1760. Isaac Webster died in 1899, leaving an estate of £87,454 (£9 million). By 1900 the company's office had moved to 57 Northgate, Halifax.

=== 20th-century consolidation ===
The temperance movement of the late nineteenth and early twentieth century, and emergency laws aimed at restricting drinking during the First World War created difficult trading conditions for brewers. In 1919 net profit was reported at £22,325 (£900,000 at 2010 prices). Samuel Wentworth Webster, a director of the company and grandson of the founder, died in 1928 with a personalty of £45,000 (£2.2 million in 2010). In 1928, one of the brewery's most successful beers was launched; Webster's Green Label, a light mild ale. In 1929 the company's entire stock of properties, land and brewery buildings was valued at £468,833 (£23.2 million in 2010). The company took over Joseph Stocks of Halifax in December 1932, which could trace its origins back to 1790. In 1957, Webster's took over the brewer, John Ainley & Sons Ltd. of Huddersfield and Woodhead Brothers of Elland, near Halifax, a mineral water manufacturer. The company dray horses, used for local beer deliveries, were retired by the end of the 1950s. In 1961 Webster's bought Daniel Fielding & Sons of Halifax, which added 19 public houses to their tied estate. The same year the company sought out partnership with the national brewer Watney Mann in order to benefit from the technical knowledge of the much larger company. In return Webster's brewed and sold the brewery conditioned Watney's Red Barrel ale throughout their tied estate. In 1962, a reciprocal trading agreement was reached with Ind Coope's North East division which saw Webster's houses stock lager for the first time. That same year the group won the contract to bottle Tuborg for West Yorkshire.

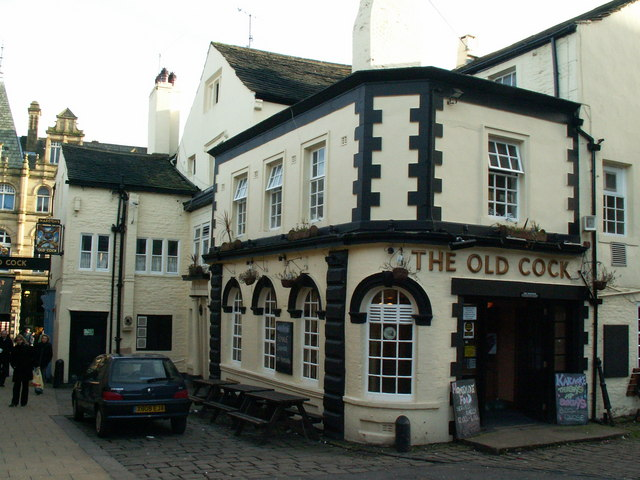
The Old Cock Inn, Halifax, dating from 1580, was the flagship Webster's public house. Their annual general meetings were held there until the company's takeover.

In September 1966, a friendly takeover of the Bradford brewers J. Hey & Company Ltd added 73 public houses to their estate. Webster's had a market value of £3.3 million, and J. Hey had a value of £1 million. The combined group had assets of over £4.5 million (£65 million in 2010 prices). Webster's continued to bottle Guinness under their Hey & Humphries subsidiary label into the late 1980s. Throughout the 1960s and early 1970s, consolidation, a good product and successful marketing made the company successful, according to The Times, with the social club trade accounted for around half of turnover. By 1967 Watney Mann owned 18.4 per cent of the company, and Webster's had a market capitalisation of £6 million (£85 million in 2010 prices) and owned 320 public houses and 12 off licences. Watney Mann had gradually increased their share to 27.1 per cent by 1972 when it initiated a takeover of the rest of the company. Samuel Webster & Sons was offered £18 million for the 73 per cent of the company that Watney did not already own. The Watney Mann offer valued the entire company at almost £250 million in 2010 prices. The takeover was a friendly one, and dependent upon the agreement of the Webster family, who owned 20 per cent of the company. Watney Mann was motivated by an increase to their tied estate. Following the takeover, Webster's continued as a regional subsidiary of the Watney Mann brewing empire, responsible for Yorkshire, north Lincolnshire, north Derbyshire and north Nottinghamshire. The takeover saw heavy investment in the brewery and the Webster's brands enjoyed increased distribution nationally. That same year, Watney Mann itself was taken over by Grand Metropolitan.

In 1979, Webster's employed a total of 1,500 people across production, distribution and retailing. The early 1980s saw the "gradual transformation" of Webster's into a national brand. In 1985, Grand Met merged the Wilson Brewery of Manchester (which Watney Mann had bought in 1960) with Webster's to form Samuel Webster and Wilsons Ltd. In 1986, Wilsons Brewery was closed down and production of Wilsons Original Bitter and Wilsons Mild was moved to Halifax. By 1988 Webster's was supplying around 1000 pubs in the North of England, and as far afield as North Wales.

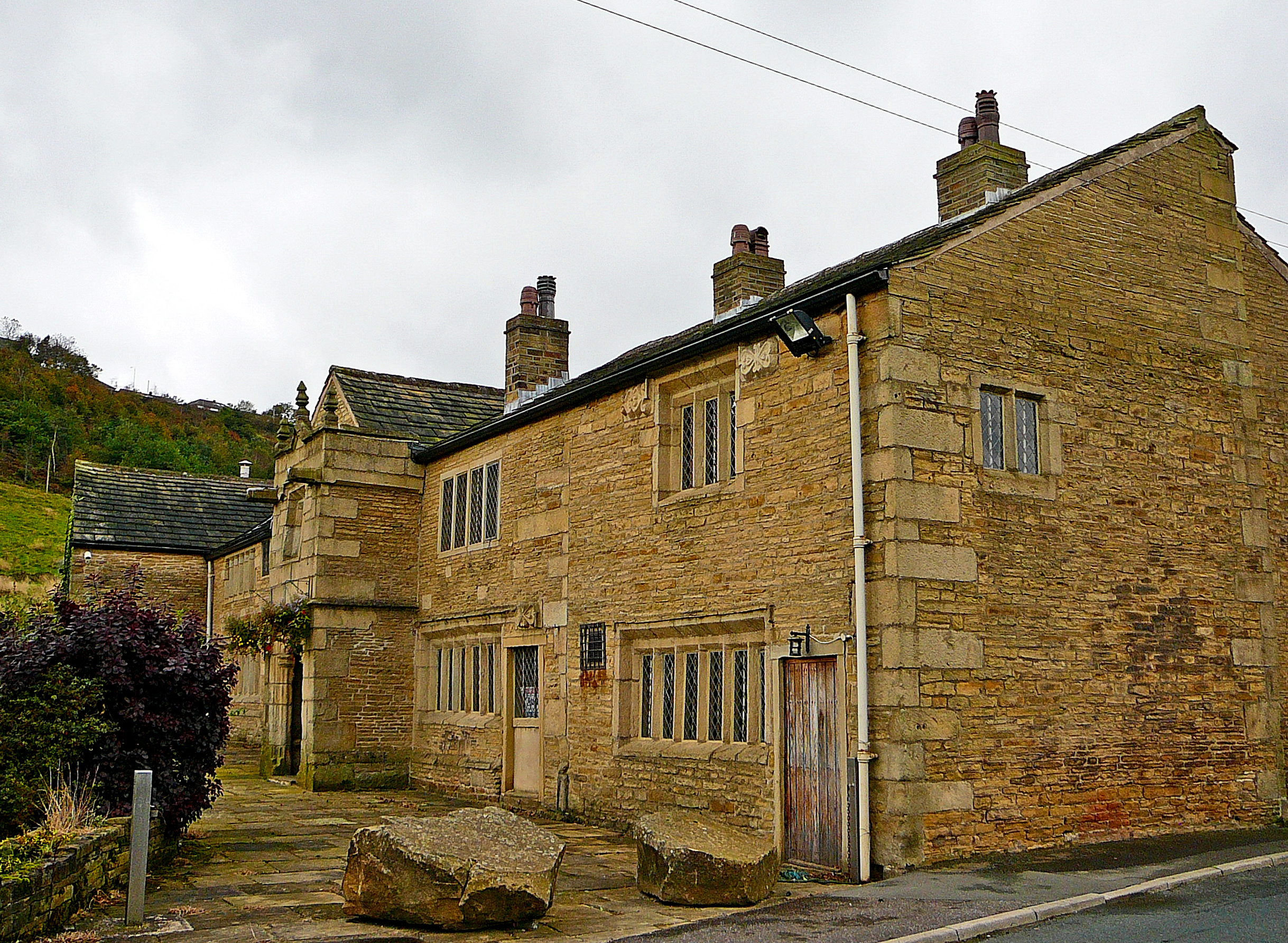
Long Can Hall. Built in 1637, it served as the brewery visitor's centre from 1986 to 1996.

Moving out of the brewing industry, Grand Met sold Webster's to Courage in 1990. By that year Webster's had an annual revenue of around £100 million and claimed 7 per cent of the national bitter market. However Courage owned the higher selling John Smith's ale brand, and Webster's was deprioritised. The brands suffered further after the Scottish & Newcastle takeover of Courage, as S&N, with their own Theakstons brand, now owned three major bitter brands from Yorkshire alone. By 1996 Scotland on Sunday described the brand as "staid" and argued that it "never caught on outside its Yorkshire heartland." By this time John Smith's was outselling Webster's three to one.

Following the closure of the Fountain Head Brewery in 1996, Webster's beers were initially brewed at Scottish Courage's John Smith's Brewery in Tadcaster, but were subsequently moved to the Thomas Hardy Brewery at Burtonwood in 2004. Scottish & Newcastle sold the Webster's brands to Silvan Brands in 2003. The chairman Brian Stewart defended the sale, claiming: "Webster's was a brand that did not have a strong brand franchise. What has happened is that brands [which] consumers demand are still here". In 2011, H B Clark took over the distribution rights for the Webster's brands in the north of England. The bitter is now simply known as Webster's Bitter. In 2015, Silvan Brands Ltd dissolved and the brand is believed no longer to be sold.

== Fountain Head Brewery ==
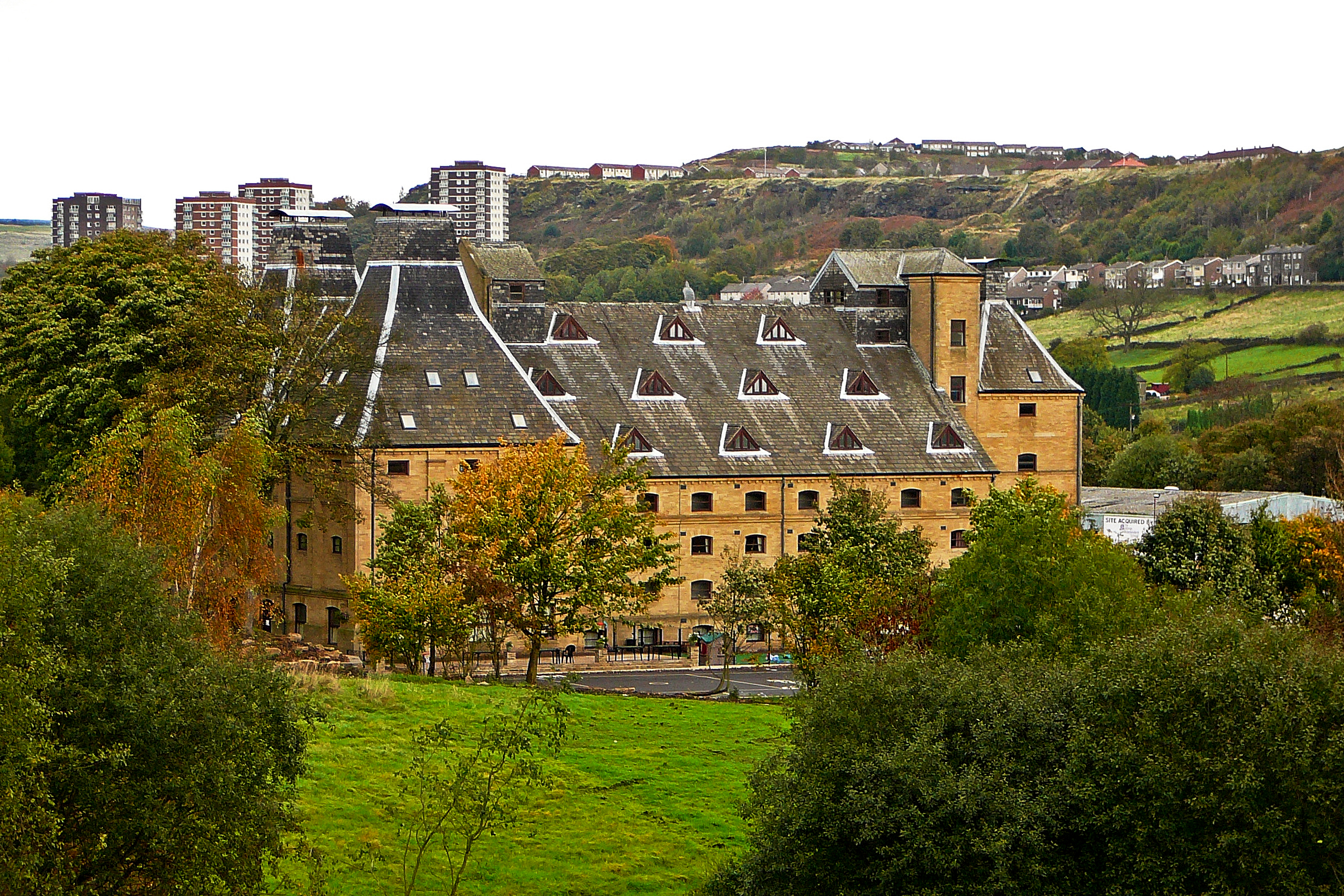
The Old Maltings, since converted into a school, nursery and community centre.

The brewery site was chosen for its Pennine spring which provided the ready water supply necessary for brewing. The water was rich in magnesium sulphate which added bitterness to the beer and provided it with a dry finish. In 1873 the brewery was extended and redeveloped. In 1890 the brewery was linked to the Halifax High Level Railway network, which facilitated the brewery's distribution. In 1900 the Château-influenced maltings building was built as part of a £10,000 (£1 million in 2010) development project. By 1958 the company's existing offices in Northgate, Halifax, were proving too small for the expanding company, and new offices were custom built on the Ovenden Wood site. The landmark maltings building was closed in 1960 as its 12,000 stone (76,000 kg) per annum capacity proved insufficient for the brewery's increasing needs, and the building was used for storage.

In 1973, Watney Mann commissioned a new brewhouse. In 1979 a new £6 million lager plant was started, initially brewing Holsten. By the early 1980s the brewery had beer production volumes of around 400,000 barrels per annum and employed around 600 people. At this time, the brewery was described as "wonderfully traditional" by Roger Protz and had open fermentation vessels, mash tuns and copper brewing vessels. Production of Budweiser began in 1984. Having previously been used for storage, in 1986 the historic Long Can Hall was converted to function as the brewery's visitor's centre.

A£10 million expansion project was embarked upon at the brewery in 1988. Construction of a new plant increased brewing capacity from 1 million to 1.3 million barrels a year. In 1989, the derelict former maltings building was converted into brewery offices in a £4 million project. Also, a new distribution depot was constructed in Elland.

In 1990, the Old Maltings was categorised as a Grade II listed building. By 1990, most of the Fountain Head Brewery was dedicated to brewing Webster's and Wilsons ales. The brewery's bottling line was closed in 1991, resulting in the loss of 54 jobs.

At the time of the brewery's closure in November 1996, it employed 184 people on a ten hectare site. As well as Webster's and Wilson's beers, the brewery had been producing the lager brands Foster's and Molson. The brewery had been running at "well below" 50 per cent of its 1.3 million barrel capacity which was deemed "unsustainable" according to Scottish & Newcastle management. Although productivity per employee had been the highest of any of Scottish & Newcastle's brewing plants it was claimed that it would have required substantial investment if it was to remain competitive.

In 2004, Fountainhead Village was built on the former brewery site. After a period of dormancy, the Old Maltings reopened as a children's day nursery in 2007, and a school and community centre was opened alongside the nursery in 2011. The Maltings College, which opened at the site in 2013, closed in 2018.

== Webster's Yorkshire Bitter ==
Webster's Yorkshire Bitter was launched in the summer of 1982. Largely a cask product, by 1984 Grand Metropolitan had transformed Yorkshire Bitter into a "massive" national brand, available in the company's 5,000 tied houses and 15,000 free houses. It was marketed as their response to the growing popularity of Yorkshire bitter in the south of England, particularly John Smith's. Yorkshire Bitter was the highest selling off trade bitter by 1985 with 18 per cent of the market. It had become the fifth best selling bitter nationally by 1989, helped by a competitive pricing policy, and was the highest selling bitter in London. The beer was not without its critics, with the 1990 Good Beer Guide describing it as "weak flavour[ed], reminiscent of a poor quality home brew – worty, bland, cloying, with a dirty finish on the tongue". In 1993, Yorkshire Bitter was reduced from 3.8 per cent to 3.5 per cent ABV in order to save money on duty.

When Scottish & Newcastle acquired the John Smith's and Webster's bitter brands as part of their takeover of Courage in 1995, the lower selling Webster's brands were deprioritised, and virtually all marketing support ceased. Roger Protz has described the brand as "almost redundant" and production of cask conditioned Webster's beer was ended in 2010.

== Advertising ==
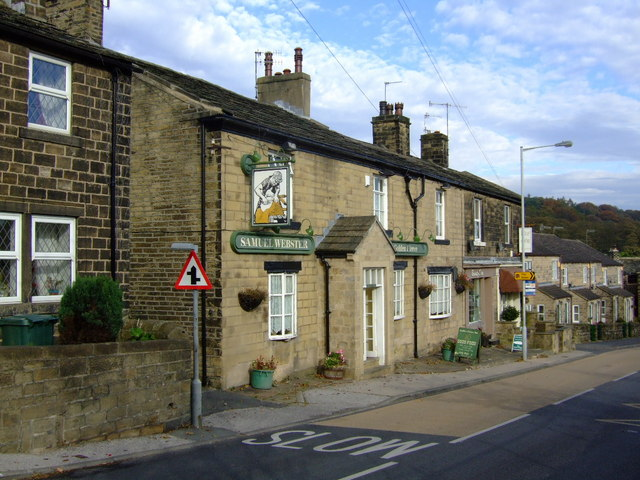
A former Webster's public house, still sporting the brewery's livery.

Webster's Pennine Bitter was known for its slogan: "Drives out the northern thirst", first used in 1970 and supported throughout the 1970s by a local television campaign featuring Yorkshire cricketer Fred Trueman. In the advertisements, Trueman would breathe fire after drinking his pint of Pennine Bitter and say "We like things right in Yorkshire – like our beer. Webster's Pennine Bitter. Drives out the northern thirst".

The comedian Charlie Williams appeared in television advertisements for Yorkshire Bitter in 1984–85. One of the Williams advertisements featured a cameo from Yorkshire cricketers Fred Trueman and Ray Illingworth. The Webster's Yorkshire Bitter "Talking horses" campaign ran from 1986 until 1992 with the slogan "It's right tasty is Webster's". Dray horses were used in the 1980s, but replaced by animatronic puppets in the 1990s.

=== Sponsorship ===
The company sponsored The Hallé orchestra to appear in Halifax to sell out audiences in 1966 and 1967. In the summer of 1984, Webster's Yorkshire Bitter invested £100,000 into English cricket, with the aim of finding six fast bowlers by winter. From 1986 to 1992, Webster's sponsored Bradford Northern RLFC rugby league team, and Halifax RLFC from 1987 to 1993, Dinnington Colliery Band from 1987 to 1990, the UK Open darts championship in 1989 and 1990, and the World Matchplay darts tournament in 1995 and 1996.
