= Dilemma (1962 British film) =

1962 British film directed by Peter Maxwell

- Opening titles
- Directed by: Peter Maxwell
- Written by: Pip and Jane Baker
- Starring: Peter Halliday; Ingrid Hafner
- Cinematography: Gerald Moss
- Edited by: Tom Simpson
- Music by: William Davies
- Production company: ACT Films
- Distributed by: Bryanston Films
- Release date: 19 August 1962 (UK)
- Running time: 67 minutes
- Country: United Kingdom
- Language: English

Dilemma (also known as The Man with Two Faces) is a 1962 British crime thriller directed by Peter Maxwell, and starring Peter Halliday and Ingrid Hafner. It was written by Pip and Jane Baker.

== Plot ==
Schoolteacher Harry Barnes returns home from work on the eve of his second wedding anniversary to be told by his next-door neighbour Mrs Jones that a scream came from his house minutes earlier, and she saw his wife running from the house. Inside he finds a strange man dying in the bathroom.

== Cast ==
- Peter Halliday as Harry Barnes
- Ingrid Hafner as Jean Barnes
- Patricia Burke as Edna Jones
- Joan Heath as Mrs. Barnes
- Patrick Jordan as Inspector Murray
- Barbara Lott as nun
- Arthur Hewlett as piano tuner
- William Sherwood as Mr Ridley
- Alan Rolfe as Arthur Jones
- Robert Dean as doctor

== Reception ==
Chibnall and McFarlane in The British 'B' Film wrote that Dilemma was: "a disaster that finally closed ACT films and tarnished its reputation for producing servicable works of modest quality," adding that "Dilemma never achieved theatrical production in Britain but was sold to television".
