= Five to One (film) =

1963 British film by Gordon Flemyng

- Feature film poster
- Directed by: Gordon Flemyng
- Written by: Roger Marshall
- Based on: short story The Thief in the Night by Edgar Wallace
- Produced by: Jack Greenwood
- Starring: Lee Montague; Ingrid Hafner; John Thaw
- Cinematography: James Wilson
- Edited by: Derek Holding
- Music by: Bernard Ebbinghouse
- Production company: Merton Park Studios
- Distributed by: Anglo-Amalgamated Film Distributors
- Release date: 1963
- Running time: 54 minutes
- Country: United Kingdom
- Language: English

Five To One is a 1963 British second feature ('B') crime film directed by Gordon Flemyng and starring Lee Montague, Ingrid Hafner and John Thaw. It was made at Merton Park Studios as part of the long-running series of Edgar Wallace adaptations. The screenplay was by Roger Marshall, based on the 1928 Wallace story The Thief in the Night.

== Plot ==
Alan Roper, along with his partner-in-crime and his girlfriend, are planning the robbery of a betting shop. Alan asks crooked bookmaker Larry Hart to launder the money, but little does Larry know, it's his betting shop they plan to steal from.

== Cast ==
- Lee Montague as Larry Hart
- Ingrid Hafner as Pat Dunn
- John Thaw as Alan Roper
- Brian McDermott as John Lea
- Ewan Roberts as Deighton
- Heller Toren as Mai Hart
- Jack Watson as Inspector Davis
- Richard Clarke as Lucas
- Ian Curry as Mycock
- Julian Holloway as Sergeant Jenkins
- Gordon Rollings as Walker
- Edina Ronay as Gloria (girl on speedboat)
- Clare Kelly as Jean Davis

== Critical reception ==
The Monthly Film Bulletin wrote: "Straightforward in acting and presentation, the main interest of this compact film lies in its plot line; again adapted from one of Edgar Wallace's less familiar stories, it is an involved but neatly contrived variation on the Great Robbery Plan which has featured in so many films. The development is sufficiently intriguing to maintain interest, and though the film has no other real virtue, it emerges as a slightly above average addition to the now well-established Edgar Wallace series."
