= The Gaffer (TV series) =

British TV sitcom (1981–1983)

- Created by: Graham White
- Directed by: Alan Tarrant
- Starring: Bill Maynard; Russell Hunter
- Country of origin: United Kingdom
- Original language: English
- No. of series: 3
- No. of episodes: 20

Production
- Running time: 30 mins
- Production company: Yorkshire Television

Original release
- Network: ITV
- Release: 9 January 1981 – 5 July 1983

The Gaffer is an ITV sitcom of the early 1980s, starring Bill Maynard and written by businessman Graham White. It was made for the ITV network by Yorkshire Television.

== Plot ==
Following the end of the sitcom (Oh No It's Selwyn Froggitt), Maynard's next character could not have been more different from the bumbling Selwyn Froggitt. Fred Moffat is a survivor – just. Bearded, wearing a battered hat and a crumpled suit, his Rover P6 a rusting wreck (in the opening credits sequence the car was famously full of unpaid parking tickets), he runs a struggling engineering firm and is constantly trying to avoid his creditors, the tax man, the bank manager, and indeed anyone who might want him to pay for something.

The series' background accurately reflected the precarious condition of many small businesses of the era and added a dark undercurrent to the situation comedy. Unlike the physical comedy of Selwyn Froggitt, the scripts for The Gaffer were wordy and sardonic and the plots relatively complex, with Fred Moffat usually managing to outwit at least some of the people who were chasing him for money.

The cast included Russell Hunter as the radical union shop steward Harry Campbell, whose interest was in parting Moffat from as much money as possible to better pay his members, and Pat Ashton as his ineffectual secretary Betty.

=== Abrupt end ===
The third and final series (broadcast in 1983) saw Moffat elected to the local council, extending his struggles to local politics. But, disgruntled with the losing battle he was fighting, in the final episode ("Goodbye"), Moffat upped sticks, sold off the business to his employees and emigrated to Australia to make a new start, only to return and take back the business after having attended his son Spencer's wedding. However the series thus ended abruptly, despite its success, after a two-year run.

In later years, it was suggested that during the production of series 3, White (the creator of the show) protested that Maynard kept changing his scripts too much, thus embittering the relationship between the two and so a planned fourth series was cancelled. White revealed details of the dispute which ended the series in a 2014 newspaper interview. Graham White published a sequel novel entitled "The Gaffer's Guerillas" which takes the story into the present day.

== Cast ==
- Bill Maynard – Fred Moffat
- Russell Hunter – Harry
- Pat Ashton – Betty
- David Gillies – Ginger
- Don Crann – Charlie
- Keith Marsh – Henry
- Chris Langham – Spencer Moffatt (series 2)

== Home media ==
All three series of The Gaffer have been released on DVD by Network. A 3-disc set of the complete series has also been released.

| DVD | Year(s) | Release date |
|---|---|---|
| The Complete Series 1 | 1981 | 17 August 2009 |
| The Complete Series 2 | 1982 | 5 July 2010 |
| The Complete Series 3 | 1983 | 13 September 2010 |
| The Complete Series 1 to 3 Box Set | 1981– 1983 | 11 October 2010 |
