= Monsignor Renard =

2000 British television drama series

- Genre: Drama
- Written by: Russell Lewis; Charles Wood; Stephen Churchett
- Directed by: Malcolm Mowbray; David Wheatley
- Starring: John Thaw; Cheryl Campbell; Dominic Monaghan; Jimmy Yuill
- Composer: John E. Keane
- Country of origin: United Kingdom
- Original language: English
- No. of series: 1
- No. of episodes: 4

Production
- Executive producer: Ted Childs
- Producer: Chris Kelly
- Running time: 52 minutes
- Production company: Carlton Television

Original release
- Network: ITV
- Release: 27 March – 17 April 2000

Monsignor Renard was a four-part ITV television drama set in occupied France during World War II. It starred John Thaw as Monsignor Augustin Renard, a French priest who is drawn into the Resistance movement. The series was later shown in the U.S. as part of Masterpiece Theatre.

== Plot ==
In 1940, Monsignor Renard arrives back in his hometown 20 years after leaving to become a Catholic priest. The village is filled with reminders of his former life, including Madeleine, his one time fiancée who has never forgiven him for choosing the church over her. The village is also occupied by Nazis preparing to invade England using the town as an embarkation point. Against this Renard performs his Ministry while being drawn ever deeper into the resistance movement.
