= Ingrid Hafner =

British actress (1936–1994)

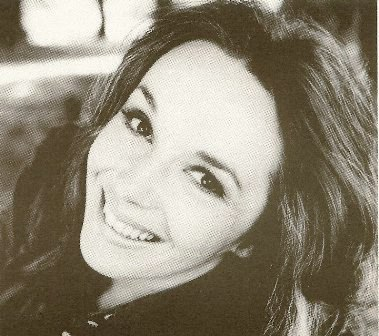
Ingrid Hafner

Ingrid Hafner (13 November 1936 – 20 May 1994) was a British actress, born in London. Her father was Raoul Hafner, an Austrian helicopter pioneer, and her mother Eileen Myra McAdam was a descendant of Scottish-born John Loudon McAdam, the road builder.

== Career ==
=== Film and television ===
Her first film role was as Ursula in 'The Quarry', made for television and directed by John Boorman – his first fiction work as distinct from his documentary films for the BBC in the West of England. She is best remembered for her role as Carol Wilson in the first season of the television series The Avengers. She had previously played Amanda Gibbs opposite Ian Hendry in the series Police Surgeon. She also appeared as Laura Granton in The Main Chance; as Kay Price in an episode of Public Eye in 1975; and as Stella, in ' The Proposal ', a series 2 episode of Moody and Pegg. One of her later roles was as Sheila Clare in the HTV series The Clifton House Mystery, in 1978. She was also the unsavoury businesswoman Jane Steedman in the early episodes of Take the High Road.

== Theatre ==
Hafner studied at the Bristol Old Vic Theatre School and subsequently joined the Old Vic under Michael Benthall, where she played ‘Sylvia’ in The Two Gentlemen of Verona; ‘Lavinia’ in Titus Andronicus, ‘Iris’ in Antony and Cleopatra and ‘Lady Anne’ in Richard III. Her other theatre work included repertory at Windsor, Colchester, Glasgow Citizens, Richmond Theatre (15 plays), From the French at the Strand Theatre in the West End, Jungle in the Cities at Stratford East and numerous productions at the Bristol Old Vic, including her first appearance there in Cyrano, in which she played Roxanne, and the title role in The Lady's Not for Burning.

== Death ==
The 57-year-old Hafner died in 1994 from motor neurone disease (ALS), leaving husband Richard Clothier and two sons, Ben and William.

== Selected filmography ==
- Bluebeard's Ten Honeymoons (1960) – Giselle
- Edgar Wallace Mysteries (1963) Episode: Five to One (film) – Pat Dunn
- Dilemma (1962) – Jean Barnes
- The Quarry (1964) - written and directed by John Boorman for BBC West TV - Ursula
- The Amorous Adventures of Moll Flanders (1965) – Elder Sister
- Who Killed Lamb? (1974) – Mary
