= Listed buildings in Illingworth and Mixenden =

Illingworth and Mixenden are villages in the metropolitan borough of Calderdale, West Yorkshire, England, and together with the surrounding area form the ward of Illingworth and Mixenden. The ward contains 26 listed buildings that are recorded in the National Heritage List for England. Of these, four are at Grade II*, the middle of the three grades, and the others are at Grade II, the lowest grade. Apart from the villages of Illingworth and Mixenden and smaller settlements, the ward is rural. Most of the listed buildings are houses and associated structures, cottages, farmhouses and farm buildings. The other listed buildings include a chapel and associated structures, a village lock-up and a set of stocks, almshouses, and a former pottery.

== Key ==
Grade	Criteria
II*	Particularly important buildings of more than special interest
II	Buildings of national importance and special interest

== Buildings ==
Name and location	Photograph	Date	Notes	Grade
Cottage to Holdsworth House Farmhouse; 53.75801°N 1.87633°W	—	13th century (possible)	A simple rendered stone cottage with a stone roof. There are two storeys, and the windows are mullioned.	II
The Fold; 53.75563°N 1.899997°W	—	Late medieval	The house was originally timber framed, and has been encased in stone, and later altered and extended. It has a stone slate roof, and is mainly in two storeys. There are three gabled wings and a rear extension. At the rear is a 16th-century window with arched lights, and most of the other windows are mullioned and transomed. Inside there is a timber studded partition.	II
Holdsworth House, wall and gateway 53.75777°N 1.87534°W	—	1633	The house, later a hotel, is in stone, partly rendered, with a stone roof and two storeys. The south front has two gabled bays flanking a two-storey gabled porch, all with finials, on the east is a gabled cross-wing, and extending to the north is a single-storey wing. The porch has an outer and an inner doorway, both arched with moulded surrounds, and the inner doorway has a dated lintel. The windows are mullioned and most have transoms, the hall window has five over six lights and the chamber window has eight lights. Over the ground floor is a continuous hood mould. The forecourt is enclosed by a coped wall containing a pair of gate piers, each with engaged Doric columns on the front face and a ball finial.	II*
Holdsworth Farmhouse; 53.75782°N 1.87679°W	—	17th century	The farmhouse, which has been much altered, is in stone, partly rendered, with a stone roof. There are two storeys, some of the windows are mullioned and others have been replaced.	II
Holdsworth Hall and outbuildings 53.75713°N 1.87749°W	—	17th century (probable)	The house, which was altered in the 18th century, is in stone and has a stone roof with gables and finials. There are two storeys, a main range facing south, and two gabled cross-wings to the east. On the front are long mullioned windows and plain doorways. To the north are outbuildings with one or two storeys.	II
Gazebo to Holdsworth House; 53.75767°N 1.87583°W	—	17th century	The gazebo is a small square stone building with a stone roof in a corner of the garden. There are two storeys and each face is gabled with a finial. On the east and south faces are mullioned and transomed, in the north face steps lead up to a doorway with a moulded surround, and beneath it is a doorway with a plain surround.	II*
Barn to Laurel Bank; 53.75734°N 1.87535°W	—	17th century (possible)	The barn is in stone with a stone roof.	II
Threap Croft; 53.75292°N 1.88649°W	—	17th century	A stone house, which was later altered, it has a stone roof and two storeys. The doorway is arched and the windows are mullioned. At the rear is a blocked porch.	II
Holdsworth House Farmhouse; 53.75789°N 1.87633°W	—	1692	A long stone building with a stone roof, two storeys and a rear lean-to. There is a large round-arched entrance with a moulded surround and a hood mould and containing a recessed doorway, and above it is a dated and initialled oval window. There is a simple doorway to the left, and the other windows are mullioned with eight lights.	II
Village Stocks, Illingworth; 53.75184°N 1.89425°W		1697	The stocks are adjacent to the former lock-up, and consist of two upright stone posts with a shaped cross member and a stone seat behind. They are inscribed with the date and initials.	II
Lane Head Farm; 53.76383°N 1.90292°W	—	c. 1700	The farmhouse is in stone with quoins, and a stone slate roof with a coped gable and kneelers. There are two storeys and a central two-storey gabled porch with a small Venetian window above the doorway. The windows are mullioned, and at the rear is a doorway with a flat-hooded porch.	II
Brigg Royd; 53.75508°N 1.86986°W	—	17th to early 18th century	A rendered stone house with a cemented stone roof. There are two storeys and a lean-to at the rear facing the road. The windows are mullioned and have hood moulds.	II
Cobble Bank Farmhouse; 53.75397°N 1.89994°W	—	Early 18th century (probable)	The farmhouse is in stone with a stone roof. There are two storeys, and it consists of a hall range with a gabled cross-wing to the west. The doorway is in the cross-wing, and the windows are mullioned.	II
North Scausby Farmhouse and barn 53.76478°N 1.88495°W	—	1740	The farmhouse and barn are in stone with stone roofs. The house has quoins and a storey band, two storeys, three bays, and a lean-to at the rear. On the front is a gabled porch and a doorway with a plain surround, a date and an inscription, and the windows are mullioned. The barn projects on the right.	II
Scausby Hall; 53.76266°N 1.88202°W	—	1749	A stone house with a stone roof, two storeys and seven bays. It has a floor band with the date and initials, and a plain doorway. On the front are sash windows, and at the rear the windows are mullioned.	II
Barn to Holdsworth Farmhouse; 53.75806°N 1.87617°W	—	18th century (probable)	A stone barn with a stone roof. It contains a cart entry with a moulded surround and a pointed arch, and is blocked.	II
Barn to rear of Holdsworth Farmhouse; 53.75803°N 1.87689°W	—	18th century (probable)	The barn is in stone with a stone roof, and contains a Venetian window and a lunette.	II
Mixenden Hall; 53.74984°N 1.91934°W	—	Mid 18th century	A stone house with quoins, a storey band, and a stone roof. There are two storeys, a symmetrical front of five bays, a two-bay extension to the right and another extension at the rear. In the centre is a doorway with a segmental pediment, and the windows are sashes.	II
Mount Sion Church And House; 53.76362°N 1.89826°W		1773	The chapel was rebuilt in 1815. The chapel and house are in stone, and have stone slate roofs with coped gables and moulded kneelers. On the front of the chapel are two round-arched doorways with impost blocks, fanlights, and keystones, and the windows are also round headed.. Above the doorway is an inscribed plaque, over which is a re-set sundial, and at the rear of the chapel is a semicircular apse. The house to the left is partly rendered, with quoins, two storeys, and a gabled porch. Some windows are mullioned, and there is a small fixed window, and a casement window.	II*
Slackfield and barn 53.76752°N 1.89603°W	—	1780	A farmhouse and an attached barn in stone that has a stone slate roof with coped gables. The farmhouse has dentilled eaves, two storeys and three bays. There is a central doorway, and the windows are mullioned. The barn is recessed on the right, and contains a segmental-headed cart entry with impost blocks and a keystone, over which is a small Venetian window containing sashes.	II
Barn to Holdsworth House; 53.75794°N 1.87537°W	—	18th to early 19th century	The barn is in stone with a stone roof, and has been converted for other uses. It contains a round-arched cart entry above which is a lunette, and other openings.	II
Wall and gateway, Upper Brockholes Methodist Church; 53.76306°N 1.89813°W	—	c. 1815	The burial ground is enclosed by a dry stone wall. At the entrance are stone gate piers with a wrought iron overthrow and gates with spearhead rails.	II
Former Lock-up, Illingworth; 53.75195°N 1.89402°W		1823	The former village lockup is in stone with a cornice and a blocking course, a stone roof, and two storeys. In the middle is a round-arched entrance with a rusticated surround, above which is a lunette, and an inscribed and dated tablet flanked by tall windows. At the sides are broad strip pilasters, each containing a circular window with a rusticated surround.	II*
Popples Almshouses (west range); 53.75924°N 1.88383°W	—	1840	The six almshouses are in stone with a stone roof, and have one storey. There are three gables, the middle gable with the date, an inscription, and a finial. The doorways are arched, and the windows have hood moulds. The forecourt is enclosed by decorative railings, and there are gates to the north.	II
18–24 Holdsworth Road, Illingworth; 53.75557°N 1.87432°W	—	19th century	A row of four stone cottages with a stone roof, two storeys, and a basement at the rear. Each cottage has one bay, and an arched doorway. The windows in the upper floor are mullioned and in the lower floor they are mullioned and transomed, and all have hood moulds.	II
Kiln, Drying Shed and Chimney, Soil Hill Pottery; 53.77941°N 1.89125°W		c. 1900	The former pottery is in brick with a Welsh slate roof. It is a long single-storey building with a chimney at the east end. The openings include square-headed windows and doorways.	II
