= Halifax Cricket League =

Cricket competition in England

The Halifax Cricket League is the premier Cricket competition in the town of Halifax, West Yorkshire, England.

In the league, there are also clubs from the nearby Calder Valley, city of Bradford, town of Huddersfield and the Spen Valley.

== League beginnings ==
The league was established at a meeting on 29 July 1913 at the Upper George Hotel in Halifax. The following year, the Halifax Parish Cricket League began with 10 members - Triangle, Greetland, Sowerby Bridge, Stainland, Illingworth St Mary's, Lightcliffe, Siddal, Clifton Britannia, Norwood Green and Elland Edge Six of the original clubs are still playing in the league. In 1926, the league was renamed the Halifax Cricket League.

== Competitions ==
There are currently three divisions. The Premier, 1st Division and 2nd Division for each of the 33 teams, 1st and 2nd teams. They play on Saturdays throughout the summer.

There is also the Sunday League, which has four divisions and includes clubs from outside the Halifax Cricket League. The Sunday teams are usually known as the "3rd XI".

There are two cup competitions for the full format (45 overs a side), for the Parish Cup for the 1st X1 and the Crossley Shield for the 2nd XI teams.

There is also a Twenty20 competition - the Vocation Brewery T20 Trophy.

== Member Clubs ==
- Augustinians (Woodhouse)
- Blackley
- Booth
- Bradley & Colnebridge
- Bradshaw
- Bridgeholme
- Clayton
- Copley
- Cullingworth
- Great Horton Park Chapel
- Greetland
- Illingworth St Mary's
- Leymoor
- Low Moor Holy Trinity
- Luddendenfoot
- Mount
- Mytholmroyd
- Oakworth
- Old Town
- Outlane
- Oxenhope
- Queensbury
- Shelf Northowram Hedge Top
- Southowram
- Sowerby Bridge
- Sowerby Bridge Church Institute (SBCI)
- Sowerby Bridge St Peters
- Stainland
- Stones
- Thornton
- Triangle
- Upper Hopton
- Warley & Elland

== Current Sunday League Clubs that play in other leagues ==
- Almondbury Wesleyans (Huddersfield Cricket League)
- Barkisland (Huddersfield Cricket League)
- Birkby Rose Hill (Huddersfield Cricket League and Quaid-E-Azam League)
- Buttershaw St Pauls (Bradford Premier League)
- Crossflatts (Bradford Premier League)
- Golcar (Huddersfield Cricket League)
- Lightcliffe (Bradford Premier League)
- Northowram Fields (Bradford Premier League)
- Rastrick (Huddersfield Cricket League)
