= Illingworth, West Yorkshire =

Village in West Yorkshire, England

Coordinates: 53.752814°N 1.887738°W

Illingworth
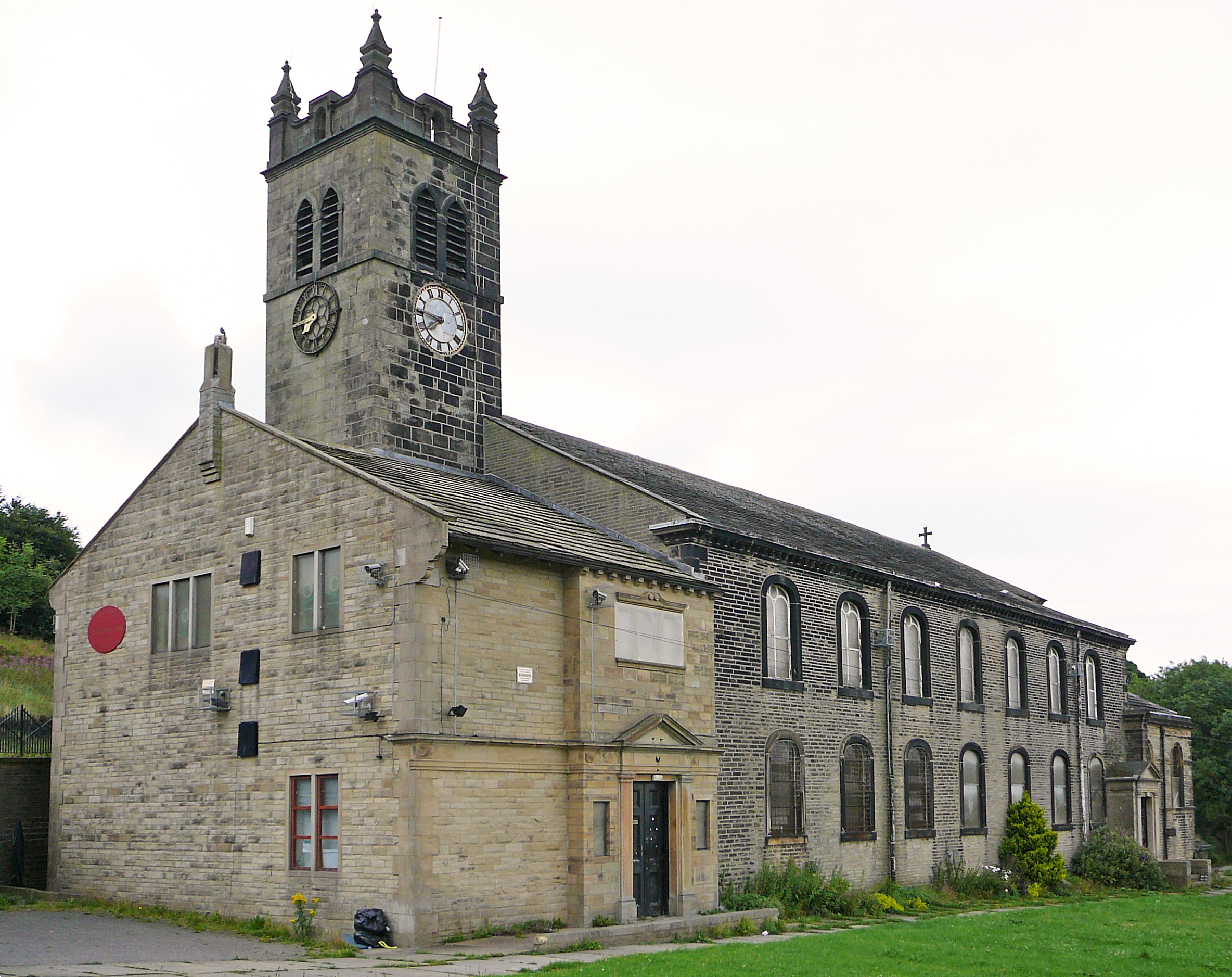
- St Mary's Church in Illingworth

- Location within West Yorkshire
- Population: 12,739 (2011 census)
- OS grid reference: SE 075 285
- Metropolitan borough: Calderdale
- Metropolitan county: West Yorkshire
- Region: Yorkshire and the Humber
- Country: England
- Sovereign state: United Kingdom
- Post town: HALIFAX
- Postcode district: HX2
- Police: West Yorkshire
- Fire: West Yorkshire
- Ambulance: Yorkshire

Illingworth is a village within the Metropolitan Borough of Calderdale, in West Yorkshire, England. The appropriate Calderdale Ward is called Illingworth and Mixenden. The population of this ward at the 2011 Census was 12,739. It is situated 3.3 miles (5.3 km) north-west of Halifax.

Illingworth is one of the Halifax villages that have all become suburbs through urban expansion. Situated on the side and top of a hill, this is an exposed area, and feels cooler than lower down districts.

== History ==
The village also has the former Illingworth Gaol and village stocks. The gaol has an inscription above the door giving the date as 1823 of when it was built. It had four cells. In June 2009, it was advertised for sale by auction .

An ancient settlement, many old buildings remain, but many have been lost including the old Talbot public house, demolished in the 1930s for a new building to be erected, in a Tudor style with stained glass windows. This in turn has been demolished in 2009.

The Commercial Inn is another pub now demolished, and on its site there are some mews style private housing.

== Housing ==
The old village smithy stands derelict. In the 1970s, some ancient cottages were lost on Church Terrace, as were some farmsteads on the upper west of Keighley Road to make way for the Abbey Park social housing scheme. The greater part of this housing scheme has in turn been demolished to make way for private sector housing.

Housing in Illingworth includes a mixture of social housing: the Halifax council built their estates towards the north of Halifax and more recently new private housing.

Illingworth is on the whole in what could be described as an attractive setting, the countryside is never far away, and there are many ancient buildings, but the village centre has witnessed severe deterioration of the environment with the aforesaid demolitions of the two public houses, and the "tram shelter". which gave a focal point on Wrigley Hill.

== Sports ==
The village of Illingworth has competitive sports teams within the area including Crossleys Juniors (football), Illingworth St Mary's Cricket Club who play in the Halifax Cricket League and Illingworth A.R.L.F.C. (rugby league) who play at Mason Green in the Pennine League.

== Transport ==
Buses are run by Team Pennine, First West Yorkshire and First Halifax.

== See also ==
- Listed buildings in Illingworth, West Yorkshire and Mixenden
