= Inheritance (TV series) =

- Genre: Drama
- Written by: Peter Eckersley; Geoffrey Lancashire
- Starring: Michael Goodliffe; John Thaw; James Bolam
- Country of origin: United Kingdom
- Original language: English
- No. of series: 1
- No. of episodes: 10

Production
- Producer: Howard Baker
- Running time: 60 minutes
- Production company: Granada

Original release
- Network: ITV
- Release: 29 September – 1 December 1967

Inheritance is a 1967 Granada-produced ITV drama based on a trilogy of novels by Phyllis Bentley - Inheritance (1932), The Rise of Henry Morcar (1946) and A Man of His Time (1966).

== Plot ==
The ten-part period drama revolved around the fortunes of the Oldroyds, a Yorkshire mill-owning family from 1812 to 1965. The early part of the series featured the Luddite riots, involving the burning of mills and the subsequent execution of those responsible. The series turned the expression "There's trouble at mill" into a catchphrase.

== Leading actors ==
The series featured Michael Goodliffe, John Thaw and James Bolam in leading roles over the generations. Each new generation saw Goodliffe and Thaw playing father and eldest son, with Bolam usually playing the part of the younger son.

== Cast with original parts ==
- Michael Goodliffe as William Oldroyd
- Daphne Heard as Janie Smith-Oldroyd
- Royston Tickner as Charley Mellor
- Madeleine Christie as Charlotte Stancliffe
- John Thaw as Will Oldroyd
- Wilfred Pickles as mill overlooker
- Thelma Whiteley as Mary Bamforth
- Judy Wilson as Martha Ackroyd
- James Bolam as Joe Bamforth
- David Burke as Henry Morcar
- Basil Dignam as Mr. Shaw
