= St Catherine's Catholic High School =

St Catherine's Catholic High School, formerly Halifax Catholic High School (HCHS)
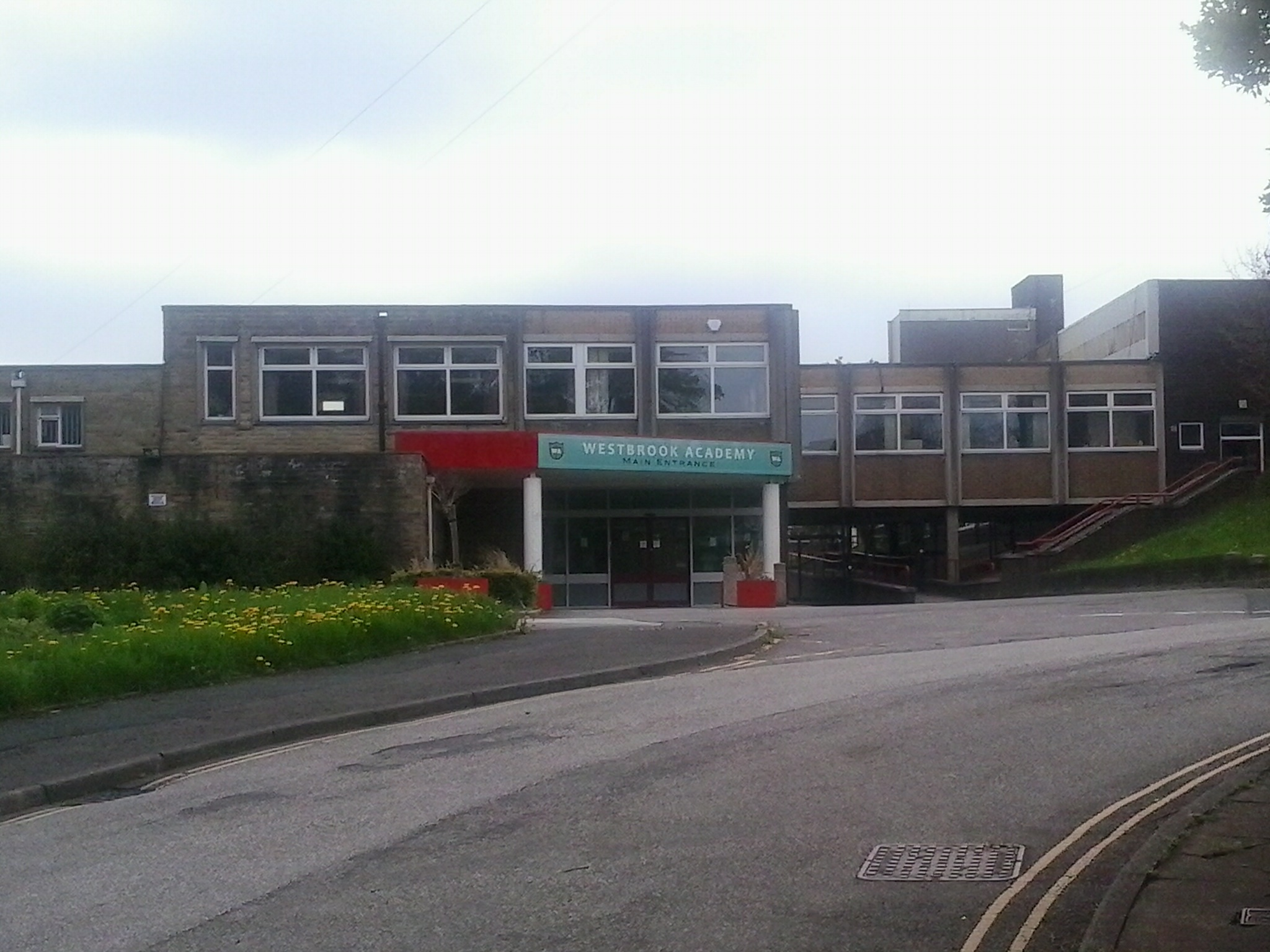
- Former Saint Catherine's school transformed for filming of Hank Zipzer

Location
- Holdsworth Road; Halifax, West Yorkshire, HX2 9TH; England
- Coordinates: 53°45′24″N 1°52′34″W

Information
- Type: Voluntary Aided School
- Motto: Nil Ante Deum (Nothing is before God)
- Religious affiliation: Roman Catholic
- Established: August 1957
- Closed: 31 July 2013
- Local authority: Calderdale
- Specialist: Technology College
- Department for Education URN: 107581 Tables
- Ofsted: Reports
- Headteacher: Mrs P Sheard
- Gender: Coeducational
- Age: 11 to 18
- Enrolment: 798
- Colours: Light Blue and Maroon
- Website: www.scchs.co.uk

St Catherine's Catholic High School was a Catholic comprehensive secondary school in Halifax, West Yorkshire, England. The school was named after Catherine of Siena.

It was an 11 to 18 comprehensive school, with a post 16 curriculum delivered jointly with its neighbouring secondary school, Holy Trinity Church of England Senior School (now Trinity Academy, Halifax). It was awarded 'Technology College' status in 2005. In 2012 the school was placed in special measures.

== History ==
Opening in August 1957 as the St. Thomas More Roman Catholic Secondary School in Holmfield. It was formally opened by the Bishop of Leeds on 14 December 1957. The first headmaster being Jim O"Reilly. The school later became known as Halifax Catholic High School in 1971. Its last name change was in 2000, when it was renamed St Catherine's Catholic High School. The school then closed in August 2013. With the last assembly held at St Catherine's in July 2013. The students were merged with Trinity Academy Halifax in September 2013.

The CBBC show Hank Zipzer was filmed on the old school premises, with the school entrance sign replaced with 'Westbrook Academy', though since 2016 the school has been transformed into 'Ackley Bridge College' for the Channel 4 school-based drama Ackley Bridge.

In 2025, Calderdale Metropolitan Borough Council approved an application from the Diocese of Leeds for the school site to be demolished following extensive vandalism to the buildings.
