= Trinity Academy, Halifax =

Trinity Academy
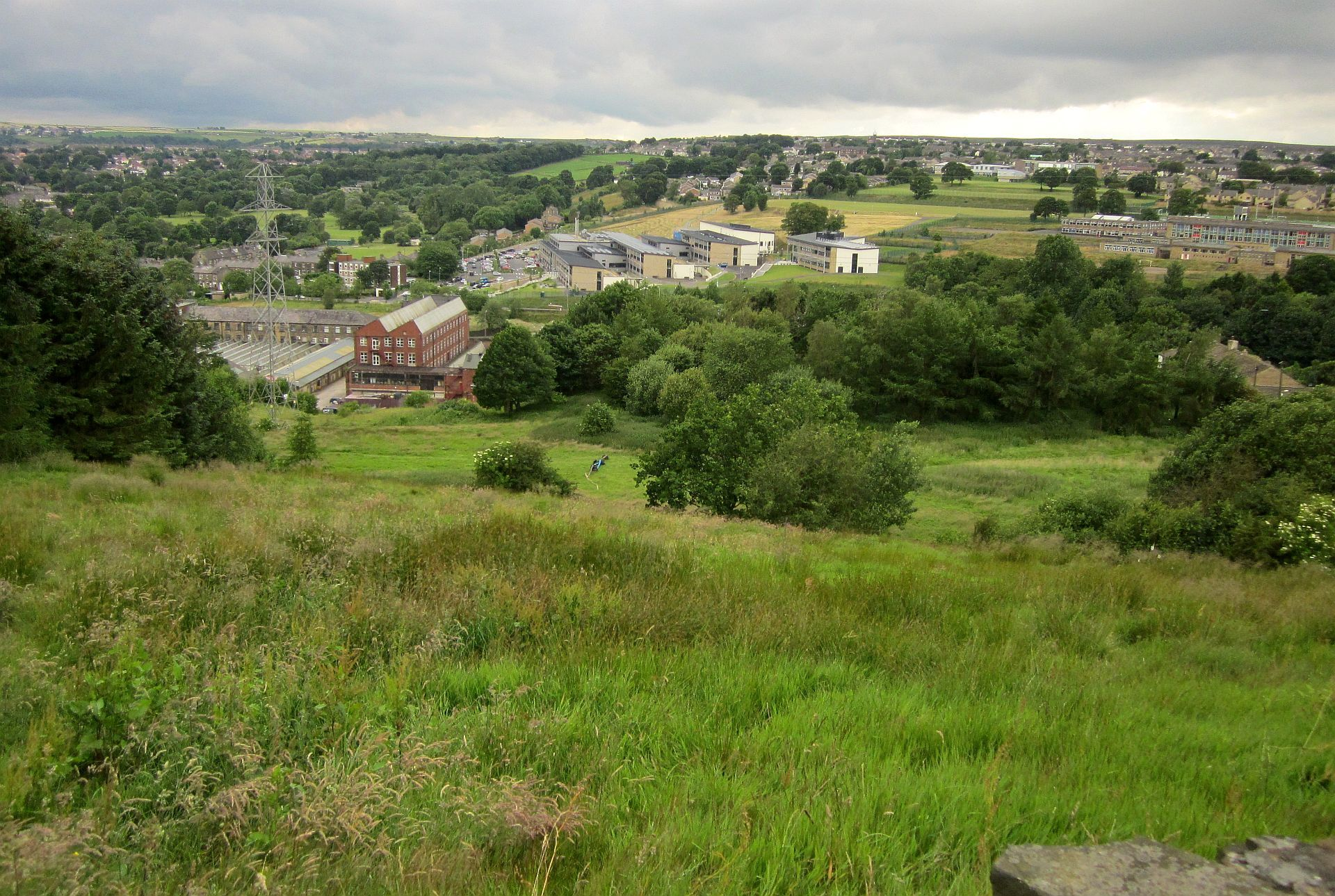
- View of Holdsworth with Trinity Academy in the centre

Location
- Shay Lane, Holmfield; Halifax, West Yorkshire, HX2 9TZ; England
- Coordinates: 53.75363°N 1.876072°W

Information
- Type: Academy
- Religious affiliation: Church of England
- Trust: Trinity Multi Academy Trust
- Department for Education URN: 136094 Tables
- Ofsted: Reports
- Chair of Governors: David Baker
- Principal: Sarah Case
- Gender: Mixed
- Age: 11 to 16
- Houses: Attenborough, Hockney, Priestley, Redgrave, Stewart, Titus, Whiteley
- Website: halifax.trinitymat.org

Trinity Academy (formerly Holy Trinity Church of England Senior School) is a church aided 11 to 16 co-educational academy school located in Halifax in the Anglican Diocese of Leeds, England.

The school was founded in 1815 by the then Vicar of Halifax. The school was situated at Savile Hall, the former home of Lord Savile, in the centre of Halifax and since has moved to Illingworth, in the north of Halifax, where it sits in the locality of other secondary schools, such as North Halifax Grammar School.

The school became a specialist Business and Enterprise College in 2005. In 2007, it also gained the Quality Standard for Careers Education and Guidance and the Healthy School's Award.

== The Academy ==
In July 2010 Holy Trinity Senior School closed, and the school site became part of the Trinity Academy. Students at Holy Trinity were automatically entitled to a place at the new Academy. Trinity Academy can cater for 1,700 male and female pupils, aged 10 – 16. The academy admit children of all, or no, faiths; however a proportion of places are reserved for children linked to local churches.

In 2012 Trinity Academy was judged to have made 'outstanding' progress since opening due to the rapid improvement in results compared to the predecessor school.

In 2013 it was judged 'outstanding' in all areas by Ofsted. As at 2022 this is the school's most recent inspection. In September, due to the closure of St Catherine's Catholic High School, the pupils merged with the school.
