= John Thaw =

English actor (1942–2002)

John Thaw CBE
- Thaw as Inspector Morse
- Born: John Edward Thaw; 3 January 1942; Gorton, Manchester, England
- Died: 21 February 2002 (aged 60); Luckington, Wiltshire, England
- Occupation: Actor
- Years active: 1958–2001
- Spouses: Sally Alexander (m. 1964; div. 1968) Sheila Hancock (m. 1973)
- Children: 3, including Abigail Thaw

John Edward Thaw (3 January 1942 – 21 February 2002) was an English actor. He became best known for his television roles starring as Detective Inspector Jack Regan in The Sweeney (1975–1978) and as Detective Chief Inspector Morse in Inspector Morse (1987–2000). He also worked on stage and in films.

For four consecutive years, Thaw was nominated for the BAFTA Award for Best Actor for playing Morse, winning in 1990 and 1993. In 1988, he was nominated for the BAFTA Award for Best Actor in a Supporting Role for the film Cry Freedom. In 2001, he was awarded the BAFTA Fellowship.

== Early life ==
Born in Gorton, Manchester, to John Edward ("Jack") Thaw, a tool-setter at the Fairey Aviation Company aircraft factory, later a long-distance lorry driver, and Dorothy (née Ablott). Dorothy left when he was seven years old. He and his younger brother, Raymond Stuart (Ray), had a difficult childhood due to their father's long absences. Thaw grew up in Gorton and Burnage, attending the Ducie Technical High School for Boys, gaining just one O Level. He entered the Royal Academy of Dramatic Art (RADA) at the age of 16 (two years underage), and won the Academy's Vanburgh Award. Ray emigrated to Australia in the mid-1960s.

== Career ==
In 1960, Thaw made his stage début in A Shred of Evidence at the Liverpool Playhouse and was awarded a contract with the theatre. His first film role was a bit part in The Loneliness of the Long Distance Runner (1962) starring Tom Courtenay and he also acted on stage opposite Laurence Olivier in Semi-Detached (1962). In 1963/64, he appeared in several episodes of the BBC series Z-Cars as a detective constable. Between 1964 and 1966, he starred in two series of the ABC Weekend Television/ITV production Redcap, playing the hard-nosed military policeman Sergeant John Mann. He was also a guest star in an early episode of The Avengers. In 1967 he appeared in Bat Out of Hell and in the Granada TV/ITV series Inheritance, alongside James Bolam and Michael Goodliffe; TV plays including The Talking Head, and episodes of series such as Budgie, where he played against type as an effeminate failed playwright with a full beard and a Welsh accent.

Thaw was cast in the police drama series The Sweeney (1975–1978) alongside Dennis Waterman and Garfield Morgan, playing the hard-bitten, tough-talking Flying Squad detective Jack Regan. It established him as a major star in the United Kingdom. He followed this with four series of the sitcom Home to Roost (1985–1990), which co-starred Reece Dinsdale, about a divorced father whose teenage son moves back in with him after choosing as a child to live with his mother. He had previously co-starred in another ITV sitcom, Thick as Thieves (1974), with Bob Hoskins.

Thaw's role as Detective Chief Inspector Endeavour Morse in Inspector Morse (1987–93, with later specials until 2000), cemented his fame. Alongside his put-upon Detective Sergeant Robert "Robbie" Lewis (Kevin Whately), Morse became a high-profile character—"a cognitive curmudgeon with his love of classical music, his drinking, his classic Jaguar and spates of melancholy". According to The Guardian, "Thaw was the definitive Morse, grumpy, crossword-fixated, drunk, slightly anti-feminist, and pedantic about grammar." Inspector Morse became one of the UK's most popular TV series; at its peak in the mid-'90s, it was viewed by 18 million people, about one third of the British population. He won "Most Popular Actor" at the 1999 National Television Awards and won two BAFTA awards for his role as Morse. Thaw is mainly known in the United States for Inspector Morse, as well as for the BBC series A Year in Provence (1993) with Lindsay Duncan.

Thaw subsequently played liberal working-class Lancastrian barrister James Kavanagh in Kavanagh QC (1995–99, and a special in 2001).

Thaw appeared in a number of films for director Richard Attenborough, including Cry Freedom, in which he portrayed the conservative South African justice minister Jimmy Kruger (receiving a BAFTA nomination for Best Supporting Actor), and Chaplin, playing the English music hall impresario Fred Karno alongside Robert Downey Jr. (Chaplin).

Thaw also appeared in the TV adaptation of the Michelle Magorian book Goodnight Mister Tom (Carlton Television/ITV). It won "Most Popular Drama" at the National Television Awards, 1999.

During the 1970s and 1980s, Thaw appeared in productions with the Royal Shakespeare Company and the National Theatre.

Thaw was the subject of This Is Your Life in 1981 when he was surprised by Eamonn Andrews in the foyer of the National Theatre in London.

== Personal life ==
In 1964, Thaw married Sally Alexander, a feminist activist and stage manager, later professor of history at Goldsmiths, University of London. They divorced four years later. He met actress Sheila Hancock in 1969 on the set of So What About Love? She was married to fellow actor Alexander "Alec" Ross. They became friends, but she refused to have an affair as she did not want to disrupt her daughter's life. Following the death of her husband (from oesophageal cancer) in 1971, Thaw and Hancock married on 24 December 1973 in Cirencester. They remained together until his death in 2002 (also from oesophageal cancer).

Thaw had three daughters (all actresses): Abigail from his first marriage to Sally Alexander, Joanna from his second marriage to Sheila Hancock, and he also adopted Sheila Hancock's daughter Melanie Jane, from Hancock's first marriage to Alec Ross. His granddaughter Molly Whitmey made a cameo in the Endeavour episode "Oracle" (series 7, episode 1, broadcast 9 February 2020) as the younger version of her grandmother Sally Alexander.

Thaw was a committed socialist and a lifelong supporter of the Labour Party. He was appointed a Commander of the Most Excellent Order of the British Empire (CBE), the insignia for which he received in March 1993 from Queen Elizabeth II.

== Illness and death ==
A heavy drinker until going teetotal in 1995, and a heavy smoker from the age of 12, Thaw was diagnosed with oesophageal cancer in June 2001. He underwent chemotherapy in the hope of overcoming the illness, and at first had appeared to respond well to the treatment, but just before Christmas 2001 he was informed that the cancer had spread and the prognosis was terminal.

Thaw died on 21 February 2002, aged 60, the day after he signed a new contract with ITV. At the time of his death he was living at his country home, near the villages of Luckington and Sherston in Wiltshire, and was cremated in Westerleigh, near Yate in South Gloucestershire, in a private service. A memorial service was held on 4 September 2002 at St Martin-in-the-Fields church in Trafalgar Square, attended by 800 people including Charles, Prince of Wales, Richard Attenborough, Tom Courtenay and Cherie Blair.

A memorial bench is dedicated to Thaw within the grounds of St Paul's, Covent Garden.

== Television ==
Year	Title	Role	Notes
1961	The Younger Generation	Customer / Max / Edward / Charlie / Peter / Denny / Martin	
1961-1964	ITV Play of the Week	Various	3 episodes
1962	Probation Officer	Stan Liddell	1 episode
1962	Smashing Day	Stan	TV film
1962	Nil Carborundum	ACI Neville Harrison	TV film
1963	BBC Sunday-Night Play	Charlie	Episode: "So Long Charlie"
1963	ITV Television Playhouse	Barritt	Episode: "The Lads"
1963	Z Cars	Detective Constable Elliot	4 episodes
1963–1965	The Edgar Wallace Mystery Theater	Alan Roper / David Jones	"Five to One" / "Dead Man's Chest"
1964	The Avengers	Captain Trench	Episode: "Espirit De Corps"
1964–1966	Redcap	Sergeant John Mann	2 series
1966	Bat Out of Hell	Mark Paxton	5 episodes
1966	Drama 61-67	Harry Fox	Episode: "The Assassin at the Door"
1966- 1973	BBC Play of the Month	Various	3 episodes
1967	Inheritance	Will Oldroyd	Miniseries
1969	The Borderers	Sir Richard	Episode: "Dispossesed"
1969	Strange Report	Inspector Jenner	Episode: "Revenge - When a Man Hates"
1969-1973	ITV Saturday Night Theatre	Various	4 episodes
1971	ITV Sunday Night Drama	Him	Episode: "Turn of the Year: Parcel"
1971	Budgie	Denzil Davies	Episode: "Sunset Mansions, or Whatever Happened to Janey-Baib?"
1971	The Onedin Line	Carby	Episode: "Mutiny"
1971-1972	Armchair Theatre	Tony/Peter	2 episodes
1972	Pretenders	Fast Jack	Episode: "The Paymaster"
1972	The Frighteners	Wood	Episode: "Old Comrades"
1972	ITV Playhouse	Williams	Episode: "Refuge for a Hero"
1972	The Adventures of Black Beauty	Jack Desmond	Episode: "The Hostage"
1973	The Rivals of Sherlock Holmes	Lt. Holst	Episode: "The Sensible Action of Lieutenant Holst"
1973	The Protectors	Mario Carpiano	Episode: "Lena"
1974	Armchair Cinema	DI Jack Regan	Episode: "Regan"
1974	Thick As Thieves	Stan	
1974	The Capone Investment	Tom	
1975–1978	The Sweeney	Det. Insp. Jack Regan	53 episodes
1976	The Morecambe & Wise Show	Guvnor	Christmas special
1978	Play for Today	Dinny Matthews	Episode: Dinner at the Sporting Club
1980	Drake's Venture	Francis Drake	TV film
1984	Killer Waiting	Major Peter Hastings	TV film
1984	Mitch	Tom "Mitch" Mitchell	Miniseries
1984	BBC Television Shakespeare	Hubert de Burgh	Episode: The Life and Death of King John
1985	We'll Support You Evermore	Geoff Hollins	TV movie
1985–1990	Home to Roost	Henry Willows	4 series
1987–2000	Inspector Morse	Detective Chief Inspector Endeavour Morse	33 television films
1987	The Return of Sherlock Holmes	Jonathan Small	Episode: The Sign of Four
1989	Bomber Harris	Sir Arthur "Bomber" Harris	TV film
1991	Stanley and the Women	Stanley Duke	Miniseries
1992	A Year in Provence	Peter Mayle	Miniseries
1995	Screen Two	George Jones	Episode: The Absence of War
1995–2001	Kavanagh QC	James Kavanagh, Q.C.	6 series
1998	Goodnight Mister Tom	Tom Oakley	TV film
1999	Plastic Man	Joe McConnell	Miniseries
1999	The Second World War in Colour	Narrator	Documentary
2000	Monsignor Renard	Monsignor Augustine Renard	Miniseries
2001	The Glass	Jim Proctor	Miniseries

== Film ==
Year	Title	Roles
1962	The Loneliness of the Long Distance Runner	Bosworth (uncredited)
1963	Five To One	Alan Roper
1965	Dead Man's Chest	David Jones
1968	The Bofors Gun	Featherstone
1970	Praise Marx and Pass the Ammunition	Dom
1970	The Last Grenade	Terry Mitchell
1972	Dr. Phibes Rises Again	Shavers
1977	Sweeney!	Detective Inspector Jack Regan
1978	Sweeney 2	Detective Inspector Jack Regan
1981	Killing Heat	Dick Turner
1987	Cry Freedom	Jimmy Kruger
1988	Business As Usual	Kieran Flynn
1992	Chaplin	Fred Karno
1996	Masculine Mescaline	The Man
1998	Goodnight Mister Tom	Tom Oakley

== Theatre ==
Year	Title	Role	Notes
1958	Cymbeline		
1958	As You Like It		
1958	The Cherry Orchard		
1958	Pillars of Society		
1958	The Taming of the Shrew		
1958	A Winter's Tale		
1958	The Lady's Not For Burning		
1958	Twelfth Night		
1958	Macbeth		
1959	Hobson's Choice		
1959	Paradise Lost		
1959	Antigone		
1959	Alcestis		
1959	Faust		
1960	The Knight of the Burning Pestle (press night)	Michael	Open Air Theatre, Avonbank Gardens, Stratford-upon-Avon
1960	A Shred of Evidence		
1960	The Wind and the Rain	John Williams	Liverpool Playhouse
1960	Staircase		
1961	The Fires Raisers		
1961	Chips With Everything		
1961	Two into One		
1964	The Father		
1962	Women Beware Women (press night)	Sordido	New Arts Theatre
1962-1963	Semi-Detached	Robert Freeman	Saville Theatre
1967	Around the World in 80 Days		
1967	Little Malcolm and His Struggle Against the Eunuchs		
1969	So What About Love?	Dicky	Criterion Theatre
1970	Random Happenings in the Hebrides		
1971	The Lady from the Sea	A Stranger	Greenwich Theatre
1972	Chinamen		
1972	The New Quixote		
1972	Black and Silver		
1972	The Two of Us		
1973	Collaborators		
1976	Absurd Person Singular		
1977	The Two of Us		
1978-1980	Night and Day	Dick Wagner	Phoenix Theatre, London
1981	Serjeant Musgrave's Dance	Serjeant Musgrave	National Theatre – Dorfman, National Theatre, London
1982-1983	Henry VIII		Royal Shakespeare Company, Stratford-Upon-Avon
1983	The Time of Your Life (press night)	Nick	The Other Place, Stratford-upon-Avon
1983	Twelfth Night (press night)	Sir Toby Belch	Royal Shakespeare Theatre
1983	Henry VIII (press night)	Cardinal Wolseley	Theatre Royal, Newcastle
1984	Twelfth Night (press night)	Sir Toby Belch	Theatre Royal, Newcastle upon Tyne
1984	The Time of Your Life (press night)	Nick	Gulbenkian Studio, Newcastle-upon-Tyne, Pit, London
1984	Henry VIII (press night)	Cardinal Wolseley	Theatre Royal, Newcastle upon Tyne
1984	Pygmalion	Alfred Doolittle	Shaftesbury Theatre
1985	Where There's a Will (press night)		Barbican Theater
1986	Two into One		
1988	All My Sons		
1993-1994	The Absence of War	Right Hon. George Jones MP	National Theatre, London
2001	Peter Pan		

== Honours and awards ==
Year	Award	Category	Work	Result
1977	Evening Standard British Film Award	Best Actor	Sweeney!	Won
1988	BAFTA	Best Actor in a Supporting Role	Cry Freedom	Nominated
1990	BAFTA TV	Best Actor	Inspector Morse	Won
1991	BAFTA TV	Best Actor	Inspector Morse	Nominated
1992	BAFTA TV	Best Actor	Inspector Morse	Nominated
1993	BAFTA TV	Best Actor	Inspector Morse	Won
1995	Aftonbladet TV Prize, Sweden	Best Foreign TV Personality – Male (Bästa utländska man)		Won
1998	National Television Award	Special Recognition Award	Inspector Morse	Won
1998	National Television Award	Most Popular Actor	Inspector Morse	Won
1999	National Television Award	Most Popular Actor	Goodnight, Mister Tom	Won
2000	National Television Award	Most Popular Actor	Monsignor Renard	Nominated
2001	National Television Award	Most Popular Actor	Inspector Morse and Academy Fellowship	Won
2002	National Television Award	Most Popular Actor	Buried Treasure	Nominated

== Bibliography ==
- Hancock, Sheila (2004). The Two of Us: My Life with John Thaw. London: Bloomsbury. ISBN 978-0-7475-7020-2
- John Thaw: The Biography. Stafford Hildred and Tim Ewbank. London: Andre Deutsch. ISBN 0-233-99475-0
