= John Le Mesurier on stage, radio, screen and record =

John Le Mesurier (born John Elton Le Mesurier Halliley; 5 April 1912 – 15 November 1983) was an English actor who performed in many mediums of light entertainment, including film, radio and theatre. Le Mesurier's career spanned from 1934 until his death in 1983. He is best remembered for his role as Sergeant Arthur Wilson in the BBC situation comedy Dad's Army, between 1968 and 1977.

Le Mesurier made his professional stage debut in September 1934 in Dangerous Corner at the Palladium Theatre in Edinburgh under his birth name, and appeared on television for the first time four years later as Seigneur de Miolans in the BBC Television broadcast of "The Marvellous History of St Bernard". The broadcast was adapted from a 15th-century manuscript by Henri Ghéon. After wartime service as a captain in the Royal Tank Regiment, Le Mesurier returned to acting and made his radio debut on the BBC Home Service in a March 1947 broadcast of Escape or Die. He continued working in television roles throughout his career, but it was his portrayal in the BBC television play Traitor, of a character loosely based on Kim Philby, which earned him the British Academy Television Award for Best Actor in 1972.

In 1948, Le Mesurier worked on his first film, Death in the Hand, a mystery in which he played the character Jack Mottram. He went on to appear in over 100 films, including Private's Progress (1955), I'm All Right Jack (1959), The Punch and Judy Man (1962), Carlton-Browne of the F.O. (1959), The Pink Panther (1963), Those Magnificent Men in Their Flying Machines (1965), and The Italian Job (1969). He always appeared in supporting roles.

Le Mesurier took a relaxed approach to acting, saying: "I'm a jobbing actor ... as long as they pay me I couldn't care less if my name is billed above or below the title". He was known for playing "an indispensable figure in the gallery of second-rank players which were the glory of the British film industry in its more prolific days". Le Mesurier died in November 1983 from a stomach haemorrhage; his last words before slipping into a coma were: "It's all been rather lovely." The Guardian noted that Le Mesurier gave the impression of an "inimitable brand of bewildered persistence under fire which [he] made his own", while Philip Oakes considered that Le Mesurier single-handedly "made more films watchable, even absorbing than anyone else around".

== Selected stage credits ==
Selected stage credits of John Le Mesurier
Production	Date	Theatre	Role	Notes
Dangerous Corner	September 1934	Palladium Theatre, Edinburgh		Billed as John Halliley
The Thirteenth Chair	October 1934	Palladium Theatre, Edinburgh	Philip Mason	Billed as John Halliley
The Dover Road	October 1934	Palladium Theatre, Edinburgh	Leonard	Billed as John Halliley
She Stoops to Conquer	November 1934	Palladium Theatre, Edinburgh	Sir Charles Marlow	Billed as John Halliley
The Mollusc	December 1934	Palladium Theatre, Edinburgh		Billed as John Halliley
Grumpy	December 1934	Palladium Theatre, Edinburgh	Ernest Heron	Billed as John Halliley
The Christmas Party	December 1934	Palladium Theatre, Edinburgh	Colonel MacHashit	Billed as John Halliley
The Happy Ending	January 1935	Palladium Theatre, Edinburgh		Billed as John Halliley
While Parents Sleep	January 1935	Palladium Theatre, Edinburgh		Billed as John Halliley
Dangerous Corner	February 1935	Palladium Theatre, Edinburgh		Billed as John Halliley
Cavalcade	March 1935	Palladium Theatre, Edinburgh		Billed as John Halliley
Up in Mabel's Room	July 1935	Coliseum Theatre, Oldham		Billed as John Halliley
Mary, Mary, Quite Contrary	September 1935	Sheffield Repertory Company		Billed as John Halliley
Twelfth Night	November 1935	Sheffield Repertory Company	Malvolio	Billed as John Halliley
Peace in Our Time	September 1936	Croydon Repertory Theatre	Mr Platt	Billed as John Halliley
Dusty Ermine	October 1936	Croydon Repertory Theatre		Billed as John Halliley
The Apple Cart	October 1936	Croydon Repertory Theatre		Billed as John Halliley
Bees on the Boat Deck	November 1936	Croydon Repertory Theatre		Billed as John Halliley
Ah! Wilderness	November 1936	Croydon Repertory Theatre		Billed as John Halliley
The Constant Nymph	November 1936	Croydon Repertory Theatre	Lewis Dodd	Billed as John Halliley
Charley's Aunt	December 1936	Croydon Repertory Theatre		Billed as John Halliley
Charley's Aunt	January 1937	Croydon Repertory Theatre		Billed as John Halliley
Love on the Dole	September 1937	Croydon Repertory Theatre		
Payment Deferred	July 1938	Theatre Royal, Glasgow		
The Romantic Young Lady	July 1938	Royal Lyceum Theatre, Edinburgh		
The Romantic Young Lady	July 1938	Theatre Royal, Glasgow		
Petticoat Influence	August 1938	Theatre Royal, Glasgow		
Husband to a Famous Woman	August 1938	Royal Lyceum Theatre, Edinburgh		
Husband to a Famous Woman	August 1938	Theatre Royal, Glasgow		
Three Sisters	September 1938	Theatre Royal, Glasgow	Konstantin	with the Howard and Wyndham Players
The Moon in the Yellow River	September 1938	Theatre Royal, Glasgow		with the Howard and Wyndham Players
Tovarich	October 1938	Royal Lyceum Theatre, Edinburgh	Prince Mikail	with the Howard and Wyndham Players
Private Lives	October 1938	Royal Lyceum Theatre, Edinburgh	Elyot Chase	with the Howard and Wyndham Players
Gaslight	July 1939 – May 1939	Apollo Theatre, London	(understudy)	
Gaslight	May 1939	Finsbury Park Empire, London	Mr Manningham	
Gaslight	May 1939 – June 1939	Savoy Theatre, London	Mr Manningham	
Gaslight	June 1939	Chiswick Empire, London	Mr Manningham	
Gaslight	June 1939	Chelsea Palace Theatre, London	Mr Manningham	
Gaslight	July 1939	Grand Theatre, Blackpool	Mr Manningham	
Gaslight	October 1939	Prince's Theatre, Manchester	Mr Manningham	
Goodness, How Sad	November 1939 – December 1939	On tour		
Journey's End	January 1940	Palace Court Theatre		
French Without Tears	January 1940 – February 1940	Grand Theatre, Blackpool		
The Man in Half Moon Street	March 1940	Brixton Theatre, London		
Mystery at Greenfingers	May 1940	Brixton Theatre, London		
The First Mrs Fraser	May 1940	Brixton Theatre, London		
French Without Tears	December 1941	ENSA		
Just William	December 1946	New Alexandra Theatre, Birmingham	Uncle Noel	
The Winslow Boy	June 1947	Empire Theatre, Chatham		
The Dubarry	October 1947 – November 1947	Princes Theatre, London		
The Linden Tree	23 May 1949	New Alexandra Theatre, Birmingham		
Love in Idleness	June 1949	New Alexandra Theatre, Birmingham		
Playbill	August 1949	New Alexandra Theatre, Birmingham		
Queen of Hearts	December 1949 – January 1950	New Alexandra Theatre, Birmingham		
The Smooth-Faced Gentleman	14 August 1950	New Alexandra Theatre, Birmingham		
Traveller's Joy	1951	New Theatre, Bromley		
Angry Dust	January 1952	New Torch Theatre, London	Doctor	
Hanging Judge	September 1952 – December 1952	New Theatre, London	Governor of Norwich Gaol	
Piccolo	July 1953 – August 1953	Connaught Theatre		with Worthing rep.
The Snow Was Black	October 1953	The New Watergate, London		
Here Comes April	March 1954	Connaught Theatre		
Twenty Minutes South	June 1955	Players' Theatre, London		
Twenty Minutes South	July 1955 – October 1955	St Martin's Theatre, London		
Coroner's Verdict	February 1956	Richmond Theatre London		
Malice Domestic	June 1956	New Lindsey Theatre	Dr. James Gully	
Army Benevolent Fund Gala	19 November 1961	Victoria Palace Theatre, London		
The Daily Express Starlight Dance	23 July 1962	Lyceum Theatre, London		
Homage to T. S. Eliot	13 June 1965	London Fringe Theatre		
Poetry Reading	20 September 1970	Little Medway Theatre, Kent		
The Television Arts Ball	31 December 1973	Royal Albert Hall, London		
Dad's Army	September 1975	Forum Theatre, Billingham	Sergeant Arthur Wilson	
Dad's Army	2 October 1975 – February 1976	Shaftesbury Theatre, London	Sergeant Arthur Wilson	
Dad's Army	February 1976 – August 1976	On tour	Sergeant Arthur Wilson	
One of Us	8 August 1976	Aldwych Theatre, London		
An Inspector Calls	August 1976	Salisbury, Rhodesia		
In Concert	August 1977	New Fair Oak Theatre, Rogate		
Bedroom Farce	January 1979 – March 1979	Hilton Playhouse, Hong Kong, Singapore and Kuala Lumpur		
Hay Fever	23 April 1980 – 31 May 1980	Lyric Theatre, Hammersmith	David Bliss	
Hay Fever	July 1980 – September 1980	Provincial tour	David Bliss	
Hay Fever	August 1981	Yvonne Arnaud Theatre, Guilford	David Bliss	
Hay Fever	September 1981 – October 1981	Ashcroft Theatre, Croydon	David Bliss	
Hay Fever	October 1981	Alexandra Theatre, Birmingham	David Bliss	

== Television ==
John Le Mesurier's television appearances
Programme	Date	Channel	Role	Notes
The Marvellous History of St Bernard	17 April 1938	BBC Television	Seigneur de Miolans	
Richard of Bordeaux	18 December 1938	BBC Television	Sir John Montague	
They Flew Through Sand	14 June 1946 – 17 June 1946	BBC Television	R.A.F. press officer	
Just William	23 December 1946	BBC Television	Uncle Noel	
Whirligig	17 February 1951 – 28 April 1951	BBC Television		Six episodes
The Railway Children	20 February 1951 – 17 July 1951	BBC Television	Doctor	Six episodes
Show Me a Spy!	31 July 1951 – 8 November 1951	BBC Television	Sir Alexander Blythe	Four episodes
Sherlock Holmes, "The Second Stain"	1 December 1951	BBC Television	Eduardo Lucas	
A Time to be Born	24 December 1951	BBC Television	Joseph	
The Drayton Case	1953		Inspector Henley	
1066 and All That	25 December 1952 – 27 December 1952	BBC Television		Two episodes
Teleclub5	4 December 1953	BBC Television		
Happy Holidays	10 July 1954 – 18 September 1954	BBC Television	Mr Mulberry	Six episodes
The Unguarded Hour	29 March 1955	BBC Television		
Douglas Fairbanks Presents, "Flight One-Zero-One"	27 June 1955	US network	Dr Garside	First aired on 27 June 1955 on US networks, before UK broadcast on ITV Television on 23 May 1956
The Granville Melodramas	30 November 1955 – 13 December 1955	ITV Television	Sir William Ralston; Sir John; Mr Rencelaw	Three episodes
Douglas Fairbanks Presents, "Deadline Vienna"	21 January 1956	NBC	Geoffrey Warren	First aired on 21 January 1955 on NBC, before UK broadcast on ITV Television on 3 July 1956
Douglas Fairbanks Presents, "The Way Home"	11 April 1956	ITV Television	Dr Lloyd	
Crown Theatre Presents	3 July 1956	ITV Television		
Douglas Fairbanks Presents	9 July 1956	ITV Television		
Saturday Playhouse	25 August 1956	ITV Television		
Assignment Foreign Legion, "The Search"	12 October 1956	ITV Television	Leblond	
The Errol Flynn Theatre, "Mademoiselle Fifi"	24 November 1956	ITV Television	Curé	
Fireside Theatre	16 December 1956	ITV Television		
Douglas Fairbanks Presents, "The Ludlow Affair"	28 January 1957	NBC	Inspector Burroughs	First aired on 28 January 1957 on NBC, before UK broadcast on ITV Television on 16 December 1956
ITV Television Playhouse	28 March 1957	ITV Television		
The Gay Cavalier, "Sealed Knot"	16 July 1957	ITV Television	Sir Richard Willis	
Douglas Fairbanks Presents	9 September 1957	ITV Television		
Assignment Foreign Legion	10 September 1957	ITV Television		
Hancock's Half Hour, "The Lawyer"	2 December 1957	BBC Television	Lord Chief Justice Williams	Series 3, episode 9; broadcast live
The Lafarge Affair	15 December 1957	BBC Television		
Sword of Freedom	15 February 1958	ITV Television		
ITV Television Playhouse	7 March 1958	ITV Television		
Douglas Fairbanks Presents	3 April 1958	ITV Television		
Hancock's Half Hour, "The New Nose"	16 January 1959	BBC Television	Dr Francis Worthington	Series 4, episode 4
Play of the Week	20 January 1959	ITV Television		
Hancock's Half Hour, "The Horror Serial"	20 January 1959	BBC Television	Colonel	Series 4, episode 6
The Adventures of William Tell, "The Avenger"	7 March 1959	ITV Television	Duke of Burgundy	
Hancock's Half Hour, "The Servants"	27 March 1959	BBC Television	Colonel	Series 4, episode 13
The Errol Flynn Theatre	19 April 1959	ITV Television		
Hancock's Half Hour, "Lord Byron Lived Here"	9 October 1959	BBC Television	National Trust Officer	Series 5, episode 3
Interpol Calling, "The Long Weekend"	11 October 1959	ITV Television	Monsieur Lamprou	
Hancock's Half Hour, "The Cruise"	30 October 1959	BBC Television	The Captain	Series 5, episode 6
The Enormous Shadow	10 November 1959	ITV Television		
Saber of London	18 January 1960	ITV Television	Franz	
Hancock's Half Hour, "The Cold"	4 March 1960	BBC Television	Doctor Callaghan	Series 6, episode 1
The Somerset Maugham Stories	7 April 1960	ITV Television		
Play Gems	5 June 1960	ITV Television		
The Adventures of William Tell	26 June 1960	ITV Television		
Jazz Session	6 August 1960	BBC Television		
Saber of London, "A Diplomatic Affair"	29 August 1960	ITV Television	Franz	
Danger Man, "An Affair of State"	13 November 1960	ITV Television		
The Third Man	3 December 1960	ITV Television		
Hancock's Half Hour, "The Lift"	16 June 1961	BBC Television	The Air Marshal	Series 7, episode 4
The Pursuers	18 June 1961	ITV Television		
Ghost Squad, "Death From A Distance"	4 November 1961	ITV Television	Volgu	
Armchair Theatre, "Tune on the Old Tax Fiddle"	17 December 1961	ITV Television		
Saber of London	5 February 1962	ITV Television		
Danger Man	31 March 1962	ITV Television		
Dial RIX	5 October 1962	BBC Television		
Mr Justice Duncannon	25 January 1963 – 15 February 1963	BBC Television		Two episodes
This Is Your Life	12 February 1963	BBC Television		Le Mesurier's wife, Hattie Jacques, was the show's main guest
Galton and Simpson Comedy Playhouse, "A Clerical Error"	5 April 1963	BBC Television		
Play of the Week, "The Brimstone Butterfly"	16 April 1963	ITV Television		
Casebook	5 October 1963	ITV Television		
Armchair Theatre, "Long Past Glory"	17 November 1963	ITV Television	Harry	
The Avengers, "Mandrake"	24 January 1964	ITV Television	Dr Madrombie	
Festival, "The Lady of the Camellias"	12 February 1964	BBC Television	de Giray	
Festival, "The Master of Santiago"	26 February 1964	BBC Television		
Sunday Story	5 April 1964 – 12 April 1964	BBC Television		
Armchair Theatre, "The Blackmailing of Mr. S"	26 July 1964	ITV Television		
Play of the Week, "The Bachelors"	23 November 1964	ITV Television	Octave De Coetquidan	
The Largest Theatre in the World, "Tea Party"	25 March 1965	BBC One	Disley	
Story Parade, "The Bachelors"	1 April 1965	BBC Two		
Memoirs of a Chaise Longue	2 July 1965	BBC One		
Riviera Police	9 August 1965	ITV Television		
Theatre 625, "Dr Knock"	2 January 1966	BBC Two	Dr Parpalaid	
The Avengers, "What the Butler Saw"	26 February 1966	ITV Television	Benson	
The Wednesday Play, "Macready's Gala"	2 March 1966	BBC One	Canon Dunwoodie	
Frankie Howerd	8 March 1966	BBC One		
Pardon the Expression	1 April 1966 – 13 June 1966	ITV Television		Four episodes
Thirty Minute Theatre, "The Caramel Crisis"	25 April 1966	BBC Two	Lame	
Marriage Lines, "Home Market"	6 May 1966	BBC One		
Adam Adamant Lives!, "The Terribly Happy Embalmers"	4 August 1966	BBC One		
George and the Dragon	19 November 1966 – 24 December 1966	ITV Television	Colonel Maynard	Six episodes
Hugh and I	3 January 1967	BBC One		
All Gas and Gaiters, "The Bishop Gets the Sack"	31 January 1967	BBC One	Television producer	
Thirty-Minute Theatre, "An Absolute Treasure"	22 February 1967	BBC One	Brian Turner	
Mr Rose	17 March 1967	ITV Television		
The Troubleshooters	20 March 1967	BBC One	Kemp	Episode: "Some Days You Just Can't Win"
George and the Dragon	20 May 1967 – 1 July 1967	ITV Television	Colonel Maynard	Seven episodes
Further Adventures of Lucky Jim	30 May 1967	BBC Two		
To Lucifer: A Son	29 June 1967	BBC One		
George and the Dragon	6 January 1968 – 17 February 1968	ITV Television	Colonel Maynard	Seven episodes
Call My Bluff	25 February 1968	BBC Two		
Dad's Army	31 July 1968 – 11 September 1968	BBC One	Sergeant Arthur Wilson	Series 1; six episodes
George and the Dragon	26 September 1968 – 31 October 1968	ITV Television	Colonel Maynard	Six episodes
Harry Worth, "Private Pimpernel"	21 October 1968	BBC One	Colonel Fullbright	
Two in Clover	25 February 1969	ITV Television	Chairman	
Dad's Army	1 March 1969 – 5 April 1969	BBC One	Sergeant Arthur Wilson	Series 2; six episodes
The Mind of Mr J.G. Reader	11 June 1969	ITV Television	Joseph Bracher	
W. Somerset Maugham: The Creative Impulse	17 June 1969	BBC Two	Mr Albert Forrester	
Tales of Edgar Wallace, "Flat Two"	25 July 1969	ITV Television	Warden	
Dad's Army	11 September 1969 – 11 December 1969	BBC One	Sergeant Arthur Wilson	Series 3; fourteen episodes
The Wednesday Play, "The Last Train Through the Harecastle Tunnel"	1 October 1969	BBC One	Judge Grayson	
The Coward Revue	26 December 1969	BBC One		
Saturday Night Theatre	3 January 1970	ITV Television		
Bird's Eye View	22 March 1970	BBC Two		
Comedy Playhouse, "Haven of Rest"	1 April 1970	BBC One	Mr Prentice	
Shine a Light	13 May 1970	ITV Television		
A Royal Television Gala Performance	25 May 1970	BBC One	Sergeant Arthur Wilson	
The Des O'Connor Show	31 July 1970	ITV Television		
Dad's Army	25 September 1970 – 18 December 1970	BBC One	Sergeant Arthur Wilson	Series 4; thirteen episodes
Dear Mother...Love Albert	8 March 1971	ITV Television		
This Is Your Life	24 March 1971	ITV Television		Clive Dunn was the show's main guest
The Morecambe & Wise Show	22 April 1971	BBC One		
Paul Temple	9 June 1971	BBC One		
Jokers Wild	7 July 1971	ITV Television		
Jokers Wild	28 July 1971	ITV Television		
Misleading Cases	6 August 1971	BBC One		
Doctor at Large, "Mr Moon"	22 August 1971	ITV Television	Stanley Moon	
Play for Today, "Traitor"	14 October 1971	BBC One	Adrian Harris	Le Mesurier's performance won him a British Academy of Film and Television Arts "Best Television Actor" award.
The Goodies	10 December 1971	BBC One		
Dad's Army, Special, "Battle of the Giants"	27 December 1971	BBC One	Sergeant Arthur Wilson	
Jason King, "If It's Got to Go – It's Got to Go"	16 February 1972	ITV Television	Dr.Litz	
Jackanory	11 September 1972 – 15 September 1972	BBC One		Five episodes
A Class by Himself	13 September 1972 – 18 October 1972	ITV Television	Lord Bleasham	Six episodes
Sykes, "Uncle"	29 September 1972	BBC One		
Dad's Army	6 October 1972 – 29 December 1972	BBC One	Sergeant Arthur Wilson	Series 5; thirteen episodes
Armchair Theatre, "Anywhere But England"	31 October 1972	ITV Television	Freddie	
Jason King	5 January 1973	ITV Television		
Comedy Playhouse, "Marry the Girls"	1 February 1973	BBC One		
Thriller, "File it Under Fear"	2 June 1973	ITV Television	Stubbs	
Black and Blue, "Rust a Highly Moral Farce"	4 September 1973	BBC One	Sir Henry	
Dad's Army	31 October 1973 – 12 December 1973	BBC One	Sergeant Arthur Wilson	Series 6; six episodes
Orson Welles Great Mysteries, "Death of an Old-Fashioned Girl"	24 November 1973	ITV Television, Anglia	Sidney Goldsmith	One episode
Crown Court, "Murder Most Foul"	27 December 1973	ITV Television	Reginald Standish	
Late Night Theatre, "Silver Wedding"	25 September 1974	ITV Television	Geoffrey	
Dad's Army	15 November 1974 – 23 December 1974	BBC One	Sergeant Arthur Wilson	Series 7; six episodes
Village Hall, "Pie in the Sky"	18 May 1975	ITV Television	Harold Garfield	
Centre Play, "The Flight Fund"	14 July 1975	BBC Two	Edward	
Dad's Army	5 September 1975 – 10 October 1975	BBC One	Sergeant Arthur Wilson	Series 8; six episodes
Shades of Greene, "The Root of All Evil"	7 October 1975	ITV Television	Schmidt	
Dad's Army, Special "My Brother and I"	26 December 1975	BBC One	Sergeant Arthur Wilson	
Bod	1975–1976	BBC One	Narrator	Thirteen episodes
This Is Your Life	10 March 1976	ITV Television		Arnold Ridley was the show's main guest
Dad's Army, Special "The Love of Three Oranges"	26 December 1976	BBC One	Sergeant Arthur Wilson	
Dad's Army	2 October 1977 – 6 November 1977	BBC One	Sergeant Arthur Wilson	Series 9; six episodes
A Christmas Carol	24 December 1977	BBC Two	Marley's ghost	
The Morecambe & Wise Show	25 December 1977	BBC One		
Flint	15 January 1978	BBC One		
An Honourable Retirement	4 November 1979	ITV Television	Edward Brown	
Ripping Yarns, "Roger of the Raj"	24 October 1979	BBC Two	Colonel Runciman	
The Dick Emery Show	5 January 1980	BBC One		
The Shillingbury Blowers	6 January 1980	ITV Television		
Worzel Gummidge, "Very Good, Worzel"	3 February 1980	ITV Television	Baines	
Night of One Hundred Stars	21 December 1980	ITV Television		
Brideshead Revisited, "Julia"	17 November 1981	ITV Television	Father Mowbray	Episode 6
Dead Ernest	15 February 1982	ITV Television	Head of Plagues	Episode 3
Bognor	9 March 1982 – 23 March 1982	ITV Television	Blight-Purley	Three episodes
Hi-de-Hi!	7 November 1982	BBC One	The Dean	
A Married Man	10 July 1983 – 31 July 1983	Channel 4	Eustace Lough	Four episodes

== Selected radio broadcasts ==
Selected radio broadcasts of John Le Mesurier
Broadcast	Date	Channel	Notes
Escape or Die	2 March 1947	BBC Home Service	
Mutiny in the Navy	14 April 1947	BBC Third Programme	
Alexander the Corrector	17 August 1947	BBC Home Service	
Trafalgar Square	29 August 1951	BBC Home Service	
The Trial of Sir Walter Raleigh	9 September 1951	BBC Home Service	
Focus on General Elections	23 October 1951	BBC Home Service	
Alcock and Brown	28 October 1951	BBC General Overseas Service	
Lord Delamere	22 November 1951	BBC General Overseas Service	
I was a Communist	8 February 1952	BBC General Overseas Service	
Dr Arnold of Rugby	19 February 1952	BBC Home Service	
Edward Gibbon Wakefield	11 May 1952	BBC General Overseas Service	
At the Sign of the Maid's Head	26 June 1952	BBC Home Service	
Portrait of Sir Edward Coke	18 July 1952	BBC Home Service	
The World is My Parish	16 June 1953	BBC Home Service	
Elizabethan Theatre	9 September 1953	BBC General Overseas Service	
Rodney Stone	20 May 1954	BBC Home Service	
Brigadier Gerard	1 September 1954	BBC Light Programme	
Abu Hassan	31 March 1957	BBC Third Programme	
Abu Hassan	1 April 1957	BBC Third Programme	
Doctor in the House	25 June 1968	BBC Radio 4	
Late Night Extra	31 January 1969	BBC Radio 1 and 2	
Brothers in Law	9 June 1970	BBC Radio 4	
Brothers in Law	16 June 1970	BBC Radio 4	
Today	12 March 1971	BBC Radio 4	
Open House	12 July 1971	BBC Radio 2	
Brothers in Law	27 July 1971	BBC Radio 4	
Sounds Familiar	17 May 1972	BBC Radio 2	
Brothers in Law	3 July 1972	BBC Radio 4	
Desert Island Discs	17 February 1973	BBC Radio 4	
Dad's Army, series 1	28 January 1974 – 10 June 1974	BBC Radio 4	Role: Sergeant Arthur Wilson
Dad's Army, Special	25 December 1974	BBC Radio 4	Role: Sergeant Arthur Wilson
Dad's Army, series 2	11 February 1975 – 24 June 1975	BBC Radio 4	Role: Sergeant Arthur Wilson
Dad's Army, series 3	16 March 1976 – 7 September 1976	BBC Radio 4	Role: Sergeant Arthur Wilson
The Kamikaze Ground Staff Reunion Dinner	16 December 1979	BBC Radio 3	
The Hitchhiker's Guide to the Galaxy	24 January 1980	BBC Radio 4	Role: The Wise Old Bird
Stiff Upper Lip, Jeeves	3 December 1980 – 7 January 1981	BBC Radio 4	
The Lord of the Rings	8 March 1981 – 30 April 1981	BBC Radio 4	Role: Bilbo Baggins
The Flower Case	24 October 1982	BBC Radio 3	
The Dog It Was That Died	9 December 1982	BBC Radio 3	
It Sticks Out Half a Mile	13 November 1983 – 15 January 1984	BBC Radio 2	Role: Arthur Wilson; Nine episodes
It Sticks Out Half a Mile	21 August 1984 – 2 October 1984	BBC Radio 2	Role: Arthur Wilson; Four episodes

== Filmography ==
Filmography of John Le Mesurier
Film	Year	Role	Notes
Death in the Hand	1948	Jack Mottram	
Escape from Broadmoor	1948	Pendicot	
Old Mother Riley's New Venture	1949	Karl	
A Matter of Murder	1949	Ginter	
Dark Interval	1950	Cedric, the butler	
The Small Miracle	1951		
Blind Man's Bluff	1952	Leftie Jones	
Mother Riley Meets the Vampire	1953	Scotland Yard Man	Uncredited
The Blue Parrot	1953	Henry Carson	
Black 13	1953	Inspector	
The Pleasure Garden	1953	Colonel Pall K. Gargoyle	
Dangerous Cargo	1954	Luigi	
Twist of Fate	1954	1st Man at Casino	
Stranger from Venus	1954	Man at Desk	Uncredited
Police Dog	1955	C.I.D. inspector	
Make Me an Offer	1955	Mr. Toshack	Uncredited
A Time to Kill	1955	Phineas Tilliard	
Josephine and Men	1955	Registrar	
Private's Progress	1956	Psychiatrist	
The Baby and the Battleship	1956	The marshal's aide	
The Battle of the River Plate	1956	Rev. George Groves – Padre, HMS Exeter	Uncredited
Brothers in Law	1957	His Honour Judge Ryman	
The Good Companions	1957	Monte Mortimer	
The Admirable Crichton	1957	Cook	Uncredited
These Dangerous Years	1957	Commanding Officer	
High Flight	1957	Commandant	
The Man Who Wouldn't Talk	1958	Judge	
Happy Is the Bride	1958	Chaytor	
Gideon's Day	1958	Prosecuting counsel	Uncredited
Another Time, Another Place	1958	Dr Aldridge	
The Moonraker	1958	Oliver Cromwell	
Law and Disorder	1958	Sir Humphrey Pomfret	
Blind Spot	1958	Brent	
Man with a Gun	1958	Harry Drayson	
Blood of the Vampire	1958	Chief Justice	
I Was Monty's Double	1958	Adjutant R.A.P.C.	
The Captain's Table	1959	Sir Angus	
Operation Amsterdam	1959	Colonel Janssen	
The Lady Is a Square	1959	Fergusson	
Too Many Crooks	1959	Magistrate	
Carlton-Browne of the F.O.	1959	Grand Duke Alexis	
The Hound of the Baskervilles	1959	Barrymore	
Jack the Ripper	1959	Dr. Tranter	
Shake Hands with the Devil	1959	British General	
I'm All Right Jack	1959	Waters	
The Wreck of the Mary Deare	1959	MOA Lawyer	Uncredited
Ben-Hur	1959	Doctor	Uncredited
A Touch of Larceny	1959	Head of the Admiralty	Uncredited
Desert Mice	1959	Staff Colonel	
Follow a Star	1959	Birkett	
Our Man in Havana	1959	Louis, headwaiter	Uncredited
Let's Get Married	1960	The dean	
School for Scoundrels	1960	Skinner, headwaiter	
The Day They Robbed the Bank of England	1960	Green, deputy cashier of Bank of England	
Dead Lucky	1960	Inspector Corcoran	
Never Let Go	1960	Pennington	
Doctor in Love	1960	Dr Mincing	
The Bulldog Breed	1960	Prosecuting Counsel	
The Pure Hell of St Trinian's	1960	Minister	
Five Golden Hours	1961	Doctor Alfieri	
The Night We Got the Bird	1961	Clerk of the Court	
The Rebel	1961	Office manager	
Mr. Topaze	1961	The blackmailer	
Very Important Person	1961	Piggott	
Don't Bother to Knock	1961	Father	Uncredited
Invasion Quartet	1961	The colonel	
On the Fiddle	1961	Sergeant Hixon	
Hair of the Dog	1962	Sir Mortimer Gallant	
Flat Two	1962	Warden	
Only Two Can Play	1962	Salter	
Village of Daughters	1962	Don Calogero	
Mrs. Gibbons' Boys	1962	Coles	
Go to Blazes	1962	Fisherman	
Waltz of the Toreadors	1962	Rev. Grimsley	
Jigsaw	1962	Mr Simpson	
The Main Attraction	1962	Bozo	
We Joined the Navy	1962	Dewberry Snr	
The Wrong Arm of the Law	1963	Assistant police commissioner	
The Punch and Judy Man	1963	Sandman	
The Mouse on the Moon	1963	British delegate	
In the Cool of the Day	1963	Doctor Arraman	
The Pink Panther	1963	Defence lawyer	
Hot Enough for June	1964	Roger Allsop	
Never Put It in Writing	1964	Adams	
The Moon-Spinners	1964	Anthony Gamble	
Operation Crossbow	1965	British Army Officer	(scenes deleted)
Masquerade	1965	Sir Robert	
City Under the Sea	1965	Reverend Jonathan Ives	
Those Magnificent Men in Their Flying Machines	1965	French painter	
The Liquidator	1965	Chekhov	
The Early Bird	1965	Colonel Foster	
Thunderball	1965	Man at Army Meeting	Uncredited
Where the Spies Are	1966	MacGillivray	
Our Man in Marrakesh	1966	George C. Lillywhite	
The Wrong Box	1966	Dr Slattery	
The Sandwich Man	1966	Abadiah, religious sandwich man	
Eye of the Devil	1966	Dr. Monnet	
Finders Keepers	1966	Mr. X	
The 25th Hour	1967	President of Court	Original title: La Vingt-cinquième Heure
Mister Ten Per Cent	1967	Jocelyn Macauley	
Casino Royale	1967	M's Driver	Uncredited
Cuckoo Patrol	1967	Gibbs	
Monsieur Lecoq	1967	Owner of French chateau	
The Inn Way Out	1967	Pub Bore	Film Short
Salt and Pepper	1968	Colonel Woodstock	
Midas Run	1969	Wells	
The Italian Job	1969	Prison governor	
The Magic Christian	1969	Sir John	Uncredited
Doctor in Trouble	1970	Purser	
On a Clear Day You Can See Forever	1970	Pelham	
Dad's Army	1971	Sergeant Arthur Wilson	
Au Pair Girls	1972	Mr Wainwright	
The Alf Garnett Saga	1972	Mr Frewin	
Confessions of a Window Cleaner	1974	Inspector Radlett	
Brief Encounter	1974	Stephen	
The Culcheth Job	1974	"Cast member"	
Barry McKenzie Holds His Own	1974	Robert Crowther	
Three for All	1975	Mr Gibbons	
The Adventure of Sherlock Holmes' Smarter Brother	1975	Lord Redcliff	
Jabberwocky	1977	Passelewe, the chamberlain	
Stand Up, Virgin Soldiers	1977	Col. Bromley Pickering	
Rosie Dixon – Night Nurse	1978	Sir Archibald MacGregor	
What's Up Nurse!	1978	Dr Ogden	
Who Is Killing the Great Chefs of Europe?	1978	Doctor Deere	
The Spaceman and King Arthur	1979	Sir Gawain	Original US title; Unidentified Flying Oddball
The Shillingbury Blowers	1980	Council Chairman	
The Fiendish Plot of Dr. Fu Manchu	1980	Perkins	
Sir John Betjeman Late Flowering Love	1981	"Cast member"	
The Passionate Pilgrim	1984	Narrator	
Facelift	1984	Bruce	Voice

== Discography ==
Albums

Album recordings by John Le Mesurier
Album	Year	Record label	Catalogue number	Notes
Dad's Army: Original Cast Recording	1975	Warner Bros. Records	K56186	
What is Going To Become of Us All?	1976	Warner Communications	K54080	
Once Upon a World	1977	B7 Media	1906577005	
The Velveteen Rabbit	1978	Columbia Records	SCX6599	featuring Robin Le Mesurier, with music by Ed Welch

Singles

Singles released by John Le Mesurier
Single	Year	Record label	Notes
"A Nightingale Sang in Berkeley Square"	1975	Warner Bros. Records	B side: "Hometown", with Arthur Lowe and company
"There Ain't Much Change From A Pound These Days"	1982	KA Records	with Clive Dunn; B side: "After All These Years", with Dunn

== Bibliography ==
- Barry, Michael (1992). From the Palace to the Grove: Michael Barry. London: Royal Television Society. ISBN 978-1-871527-40-7.
- Browning, John Edgar; Picart, Caroline Joan (Kay) (2010). Dracula in Visual Media: Film, Television, Comic Book and Electronic Game Appearances, 1921–2010. Jefferson, North Carolina: McFarland & Company. ISBN 978-0-7864-3365-0.
- Le Mesurier, Joan (1988). Lady Don't Fall Backwards: A memoir dedicated to Tony Hancock and John Le Mesurier. London: Sidgwick & Jackson. ISBN 978-0-283-99664-1.
- Le Mesurier, John (1984). A Jobbing Actor. London: Elm Tree Books. ISBN 978-0-241-11063-8.
- McCann, Graham (2010). Do You Think That's Wise ... ? The life of John Le Mesurier. London: Aurum Press. ISBN 978-1-84513-583-6.
- McFarlane, Brian (2005). The Encyclopedia of British Film. London: Methuen Publishing. ISBN 978-0-413-77526-9.
- Morecambe, Gary (2009). You'll Miss Me When I'm Gone: The life and work of Eric Morecambe. London: HarperCollins. ISBN 978-0-00-734367-6.
- Parish, James Robert; Stanke, Don E; Pitts, Michael R (1977). The All-Americans. New Rochelle: Arlington House Publishers. ISBN 978-0-87000-363-9.
- Pertwee, Bill (2009). Dad's Army: The Making of a Television Legend. London: Anova Books. ISBN 978-1-84486-105-7.
- Pym, John (2004). Time Out Film Guide. London: Random House. ISBN 978-1-904978-21-3.
- Quinlan, David (1995). Quinlan's Illustrated Directory of Film Character Actors. London: Batsford Books. ISBN 978-0-7134-7040-6.
- Warren, Bill (1997). Keep Watching the Skies!: American science fiction movies of the fifties, Volume 1. Jefferson, North Carolina: McFarland & Company. ISBN 978-0-7864-0479-7.
- Webber, Richard (2011). Fifty Years of Hancock's Half Hour. London: Random House. ISBN 978-1-4464-0998-5.
