= The Narrowing Circle (novel) =

1954 novel

- First US edition
- Author: Julian Symons
- Language: English
- Genre: Mystery
- Publisher: Gollancz (UK); Harper & Brothers (US)
- Publication date: 1954
- Publication place: United Kingdom
- Media type: Print

The Narrowing Circle is a 1954 mystery crime novel by the British writer Julian Symons. The title refers to the "narrowing circle" the investigating policemen throw around the most likely suspect.

== Synopsis ==
An ambitious young man working for a magazine expects promotion, but is passed over for one of his colleagues. When, within twenty four hours the colleague turns up dead, he becomes the prime suspect for the murder.

== Film adaptation ==
In 1956 it was made into a British film of the same title directed by Charles Saunders and starring Paul Carpenter, Hazel Court and Russell Napier.

== Bibliography ==
- Goble, Alan. The Complete Index to Literary Sources in Film. Walter de Gruyter, 1999.
- Reilly, John M. Twentieth Century Crime & Mystery Writers. Springer, 2015.
- Walsdorf, John J. & Allen, Bonnie J. Julian Symons: A Bibliography. Oak Knoll Press, 1996.
