= John Le Mesurier =

English actor (1912–1983)

Le Mesurier in 1973

John Le Mesurier (/lə ˈmɛʒərə/, born John Elton Le Mesurier Halliley; 5 April 1912 – 15 November 1983) was an English actor. He is probably best remembered for his comedic role as Sergeant Arthur Wilson in the BBC television situation comedy Dad's Army (1968–1977). A self-confessed "jobbing actor", Le Mesurier appeared in more than 120 films across a range of genres, normally in smaller supporting parts.

Le Mesurier became interested in the stage as a young adult and enrolled at the Fay Compton Studio of Dramatic Art in 1933. From there he took a position in repertory theatre and made his stage debut in September 1934 at the Palladium Theatre in Edinburgh in the J. B. Priestley play Dangerous Corner. He later accepted an offer to work with Alec Guinness in a John Gielgud production of Hamlet. He first appeared on television in 1938 as Seigneur de Miolans in the BBC broadcast of The Marvellous History of St Bernard. During the Second World War Le Mesurier was posted to British India, as a captain with the Royal Tank Regiment. Following the war, he returned to acting and made his film debut in the 1940s.

Le Mesurier had a prolific film career, appearing mostly in comedies, usually in roles portraying figures of authority such as army officers, policemen and judges. As well as Hancock's Half Hour, Le Mesurier appeared in Tony Hancock's two principal films, The Rebel and The Punch and Judy Man. In 1971, Le Mesurier received his only award: a British Academy of Film and Television Arts "Best Television Actor" award for his lead performance in Dennis Potter's television play Traitor; it was one of his few lead roles.

He took a relaxed approach to acting and felt that his parts were those of "a decent chap all at sea in a chaotic world not of his own making." Le Mesurier was married three times, most notably to the actress Hattie Jacques. A heavy drinker of alcohol for most of his life, Le Mesurier died in 1983, aged 71, from a stomach haemorrhage, brought about as a complication of cirrhosis of the liver. After his death, critics reflected that, for an actor who normally took minor roles, the viewing public were "enormously fond of him".

== Biography ==
=== Early life ===
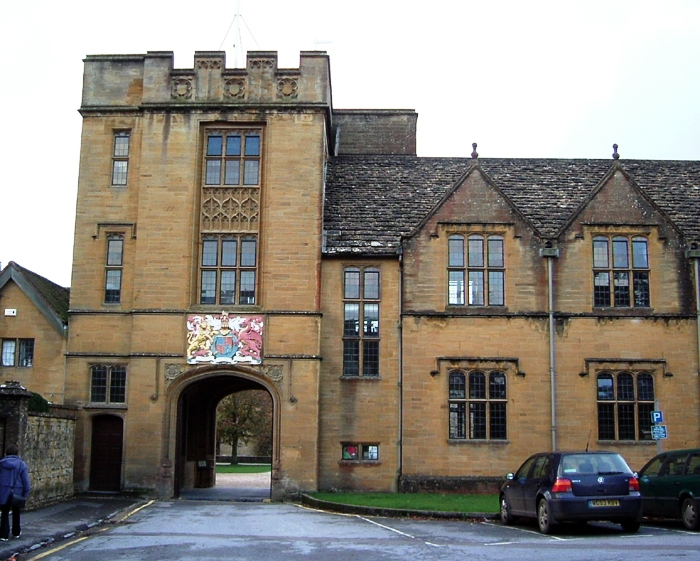
Sherborne School, Dorset, which Le Mesurier attended and disliked intensely

Le Mesurier was born John Elton Le Mesurier Halliley in Bedford on 5 April 1912. His parents were Charles Elton Halliley, a solicitor, and Amy Michelle (née Le Mesurier), whose family were from Alderney in the Channel Islands; both families were affluent, with histories of government service or work in the legal profession. (Note: On his father's side, the Halliley family had been civil servants based abroad; Elton's father, Charles Bailey Halliley, was brought up in Ceylon where his father was a senior civil servant in the Customs Department. Other members of the Halliley family held high ranks in the services, or positions of power in Whitehall. Amy Le Mesurier's family included the Rev. Thomas Le Mesurier, a British cleric, lawyer and polemicist; John Le Mesurier, the last hereditary governor of Alderney; and Colonel Frederick Le Mesurier, the inventor of the screw gun.) While John was an infant the family settled in Bury St Edmunds, in West Suffolk. He was sent to school, first to Grenham House in Kent, and later to Sherborne School in Dorset, where one of his fellow pupils was the mathematician Alan Turing.

Le Mesurier disliked both schools intensely, citing insensitive teaching methods and an inability to accept individualism. He later wrote: "I resented Sherborne for its closed mind, its collective capacity for rejecting anything that did not conform to the image of manhood as portrayed in the ripping yarns of a scouting manual."

From an early age Le Mesurier had been interested in acting and performing; as a child he had frequently been taken to the West End of London to watch Ralph Lynn and Tom Walls perform in the series of farces at the Aldwych Theatre. In his childhood in Bury St Edmunds, the family lived less than 300 yards from the Theatre Royal, and his autobiography records meeting actors from that theatre as his earliest childhood memory. These experiences fuelled an early desire to make a career on the stage. After leaving school he was initially persuaded to follow his father's line of work, as an articled clerk at Greene & Greene, a firm of solicitors in Bury St Edmunds; in his spare time he took part in local amateur dramatics. In 1933 he decided to leave the legal profession, and in September he enrolled at the Fay Compton Studio of Dramatic Art; a fellow student was the actor Alec Guinness, with whom he became close friends.

In July 1934, the studio staged their annual public revue in which both Le Mesurier and Guinness took part; among the judges for the event were John Gielgud, Leslie Henson, Alfred Hitchcock and Ivor Novello. Le Mesurier received a Certificate of Fellowship, while Guinness won the Fay Compton prize. After the revue, rather than remain at the studio for further tuition, Le Mesurier took an opportunity to join the Edinburgh-based Millicent Ward Repertory Players at a salary of £3.10s (£3.50) a week. (Note: £3.50 in 1934 is approximately equivalent to £220 in 2025, according to calculations based on Consumer Price Index measure of inflation.)

=== Career ===
==== 1934–1946 ====
The Millicent Ward repertory company typically staged evening performances of three-act plays; the works changed each week, and rehearsals were held during the daytime for the following week's production. Under his birth name John Halliley, Le Mesurier made his stage debut in September 1934 at the Palladium Theatre, Edinburgh in the J. B. Priestley play Dangerous Corner, along with three other newcomers to the company. The reviewer for The Scotsman thought that Le Mesurier was well cast in the role. Appearances in While Parents Sleep and Cavalcade were followed by a break, as problems arose with the lease of the theatre. Le Mesurier then accepted an offer to appear with Alec Guinness in a John Gielgud production of Hamlet, which began in Streatham in the spring of 1935 and later toured the English provinces. Le Mesurier understudied Anthony Quayle's role of Guildenstern, and otherwise appeared in the play as an extra.

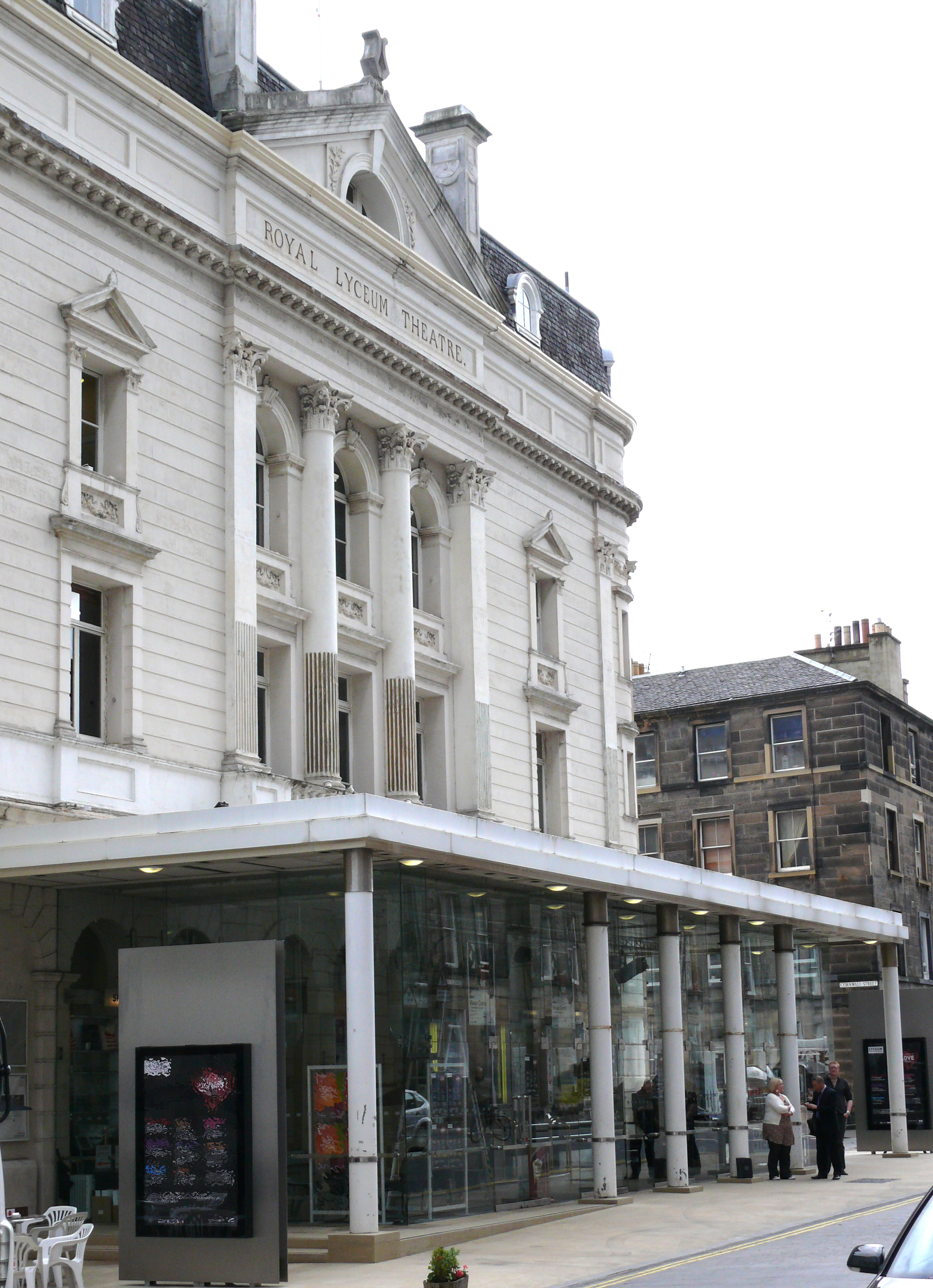
Royal Lyceum Theatre in Edinburgh, where Le Mesurier appeared in numerous roles during 1938

In July 1935, Le Mesurier was hired by the Oldham repertory company, based at the Coliseum Theatre; his first appearance with them was in a version of the Wilson Collison play, Up in Mabel's Room; he was sacked after one week for missing a performance after oversleeping. (Note: On hearing the story later, Noël Coward told Le Mesurier "A very sensible choice of play to sleep through, dear boy".) In September 1935, he moved to the Sheffield Repertory Theatre to appear in Mary, Mary, Quite Contrary, and also played Malvolio in Shakespeare's Twelfth Night. Le Mesurier later commented on the slow progress of his career: "had I known it was going to take so long, I might well have given the whole thing up". In 1937 he joined the Croydon Repertory Theatre, where he appeared in nine productions in 1936 and 1937. During this period Le Mesurier changed his professional name from John Halliley to John Le Mesurier; his biographer Graham McCann observes that "he never bothered, at least in public, to explain the reason for his decision". Le Mesurier used his new name for the first time in the September 1937 production of Love on the Dole.

Le Mesurier first appeared on television in 1938, thus becoming one of the medium's pioneering actors. His initial appearance was in a production of The Marvellous History of St Bernard in which he appeared as Seigneur de Miolans in a play adapted from a 15th-century manuscript by Henri Ghéon. Alongside the television appearance, he continued to appear on stage in Edinburgh and Glasgow with the Howard and Wyndham Players, at least until late 1938 when he returned to London and re-joined Croydon Repertory Theatre.

His second spell with the troupe ended a few months later when, from May to October 1939 he appeared in Gaslight, first in London and subsequently on tour. The reviewer in The Manchester Guardian considered that Le Mesurier gave "a faultless performance", and that "the character is not overemphasised. One may praise it best by saying that Mr. Le Mesurier gives one a really uncomfortable feeling in the stomach".

From November to December 1939, Le Mesurier toured Britain in a production of Goodness, How Sad, during which time he met the director's daughter, June Melville, whom he married in April 1940. After spending January and February 1940 in French Without Tears at the Grand Theatre in Blackpool, he returned to London where he was employed by the Brixton Theatre, appearing in a series of productions. In his time in repertory, Le Mesurier took on a variety of roles across several genres; his biographer Graham McCann observed that his range included "comedies and tragedies, thrillers and fantasies, tense courtroom dramas and frenzied farces, Shakespeare and Ibsen, Sheridan and Wilde, Molière and Shaw, Congreve and Coward. The range was remarkable".

In September 1940 Le Mesurier's rented home was hit by a German bomb, destroying all his possessions, including his call-up papers. In the same bombing raid, the theatre in Brixton in which he was working was also hit. A few days later he reported for basic training with the Royal Armoured Corps; in June 1941 he was commissioned into the Royal Tank Regiment. He served in Britain until 1943 when he was posted to British India where he spent the rest of the war. Le Mesurier later claimed that he had had "a comfortable war, with captaincy thrust upon me, before I was demobbed in 1946".

==== 1946–1959 ====
On his return to Britain, Le Mesurier returned to acting; he initially struggled for work, finding only a few minor roles. By the late 1940s he was appearing in second feature shorts, including Death in the Hand (1948), which starred Esmé Percy and Ernest Jay. He followed this with equally small roles in the 1949 film Old Mother Riley's New Venture—where his name was misspelt on the credits as "Le Meseurier"—and the 1950 crime film Dark Interval. During the same period he also frequently appeared on stage in Birmingham.

Le Mesurier undertook several roles on television in 1951, including that of Doctor Forrest in The Railway Children, the blackmailer Eduardo Lucas in Sherlock Holmes: The Second Stain, and Joseph in the nativity play A Time to be Born. The same year Tony Hancock joined Le Mesurier's second wife, Hattie Jacques (the couple had married in 1949 following his divorce from June Melville earlier that year) in the radio series Educating Archie. Le Mesurier and Hancock became friends; they would often go for drinking sessions around Soho, where they ended up in jazz clubs. After Hancock left Educating Archie in 1952 after one season, the friendship continued, and Jacques joined the cast of Hancock's Half Hour during the fourth radio series in 1956.

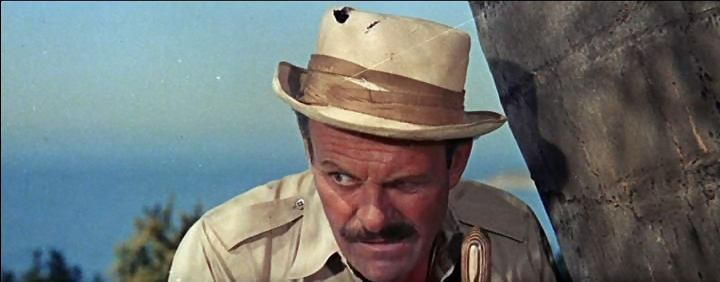
Terry-Thomas, alongside whom Le Mesurier appeared in Private's Progress and Carlton-Browne of the F.O.

In 1952, as well as appearing in the films Blind Man's Bluff and Mother Riley Meets the Vampire, Le Mesurier also appeared as the doctor in Angry Dust at the New Torch Theatre, London. Parnell Bradbury, writing in The Times, thought Le Mesurier had played the role extraordinarily well; Harold Hobson, writing in The Sunday Times, thought that "the trouble with Mr. John Le Mesurier's Dr. Weston is that he approaches the man too snarlingly ... [it is] a notion of genius that would be unacceptable anywhere outside Victorian melodrama". In 1953, he had a role as a bureaucrat in the short film The Pleasure Garden, which won the Prix du Film de Fantaisie Poétique at the Cannes Film Festival in 1954. After a long run of small roles in second features, his 1955 portrayal of the registrar in Roy Boulting's comedy Josephine and Men, "jerked him out of the rut", according to Philip Oakes.

Following his appearance in Josephine and Men, John and Roy Boulting cast Le Mesurier as a psychiatrist in their 1956 Second World War film, Private's Progress. The cast featured many leading British actors of the time, including Ian Carmichael and Richard Attenborough. Dilys Powell, reviewing for The Sunday Times, thought that the cast was "embellished" by Le Mesurier's presence, among others. Later in 1956 Le Mesurier again appeared alongside Attenborough, with small roles in Jay Lewis's The Baby and the Battleship and Roy Boulting's Brothers in Law, the latter of which also featured Carmichael and Terry-Thomas. He was also active in television, in a variety of roles in episodes of Douglas Fairbanks Presents, a series of short dramas.

Le Mesurier's friendship with Tony Hancock provided a further source of work when Hancock asked him to be one of the regular supporting actors in Hancock's Half Hour, when it moved from radio to television. Le Mesurier subsequently appeared in seven episodes of the show between 1957 and 1960, and then in an episode of a follow-up series entitled Hancock. In 1958 he appeared in ten films, among them Roy Boulting's comedy Happy Is the Bride, about which Dilys Powell wrote in The Sunday Times: "[M]y vote for the most entertaining contributions ... goes to the two fathers, John Le Mesurier and Cecil Parker". In 1959, the busiest year of his career, Le Mesurier took part in 13 films, including I'm All Right Jack, which was the most successful of Le Mesurier's credited films that year; he also had an uncredited role as a doctor in Ben-Hur. (Note: The thirteen films in which Le Mesurier appeared in 1959 were: Our Man in Havana, The Captain's Table, Operation Amsterdam, Ben-Hur, The Lady Is a Square, Jack the Ripper, The Wreck of the Mary Deare, Desert Mice, Follow a Star, Too Many Crooks, Carlton-Browne of the F.O., The Hound of the Baskervilles and I'm All Right Jack.)

==== 1960–1968 ====
Le Mesurier appeared in nine films in 1960, (Note: The nine films were School for Scoundrels, The Day They Robbed the Bank of England, Never Let Go, Doctor in Love, The Bulldog Breed, The Pure Hell of St Trinian's, A Touch of Larceny, Let's Get Married and Dead Lucky.) as well as nine television programmes, including episodes of Hancock's Half Hour, Saber of London and Danger Man. (Note: The nine television programmes were Saber of London (two episodes), Hancock's Half Hour, The Somerset Maugham Stories, Play Gems, The Adventures of William Tell, Jazz Session, Danger Man and The Third Man.) His work the following year included a part in Peter Sellers's directorial debut Mr. Topaze, a film which failed both critically and commercially. He provided the voice of Mr. Justice Byrne in a recording of excerpts from the transcript of R v Penguin Books Ltd.—the court case concerning the publication of D. H. Lawrence's Lady Chatterley's Lover—which also featured Michael Hordern and Maurice Denham. J.W. Lambert, reviewing for The Sunday Times, wrote that Le Mesurier gave "precisely the air of confident incredulity which the learned gentleman exhibited in court". Later that year he played Hancock's office manager in the first of Tony Hancock's two principal film vehicles, The Rebel.

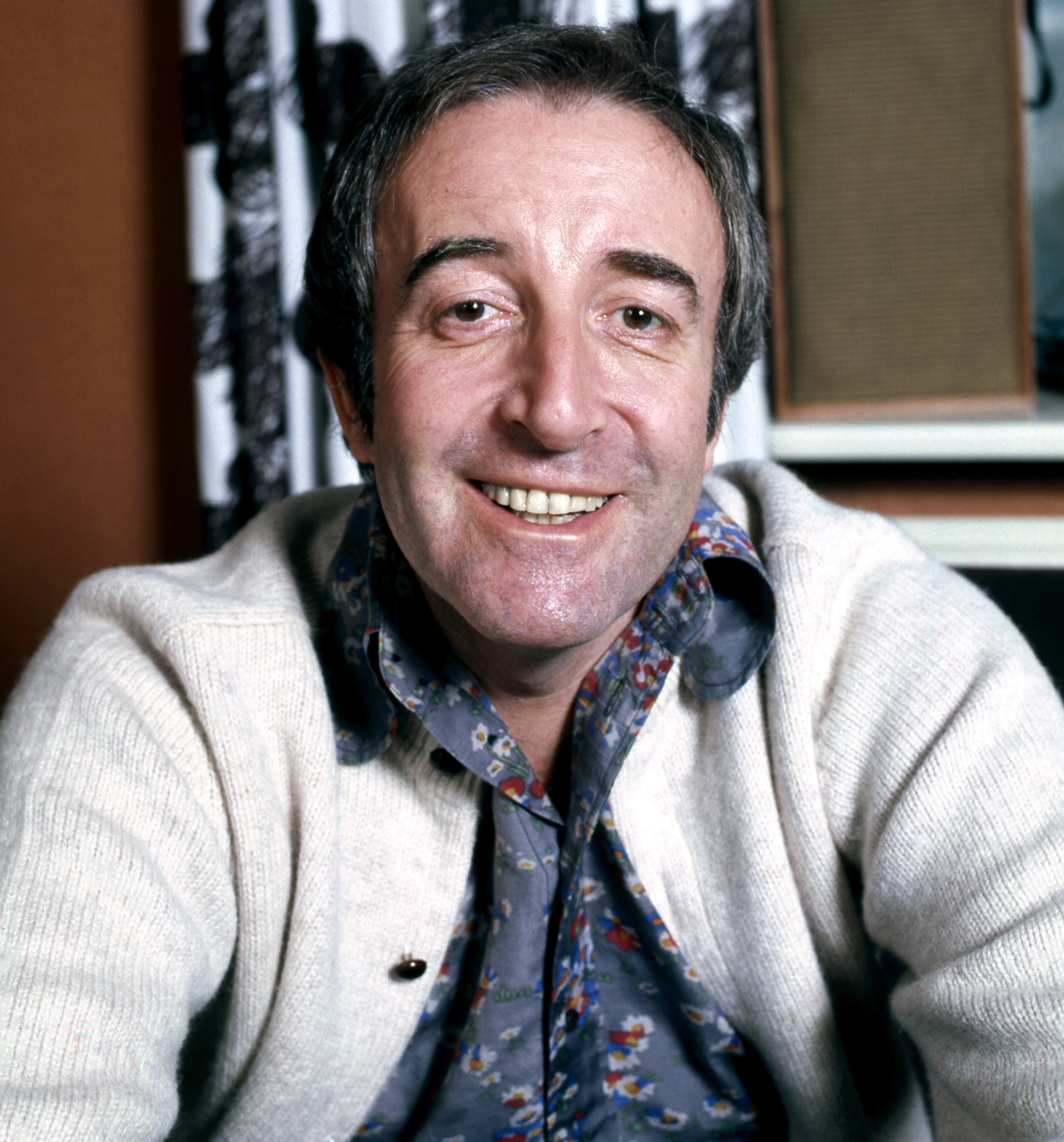
Peter Sellers, with whom Le Mesurier appeared in several films

In 1962 he appeared in Wendy Toye's comedy film We Joined the Navy before reuniting with Peter Sellers in Only Two Can Play, Sidney Gilliat's film of the novel That Uncertain Feeling by Kingsley Amis; Powell noted with pleasure "the armour of his gravity pierced by polite bewilderment". She compared Le Mesurier with the well-known American straight-face comedian, John McGiver. After appearing in another Sellers film in 1962—Waltz of the Toreadors—Le Mesurier joined him in the 1963 comedy The Wrong Arm of the Law. Powell again reviewed the pair's film, commenting that "I thought I knew by now every shade in the acting of John Le Mesurier (not that I could ever get tired of any of them); but there seems a new shade here". The same year, he appeared in a third Sellers film, The Pink Panther, as a defence lawyer, and in the second and last of Tony Hancock's starring vehicles, The Punch and Judy Man. Le Mesurier played Sandman in the latter film; Powell wrote that the role "allowed a gentler and subtler character than usual". He also appeared in a series of advertisements for Homepride flour in 1964, providing the voice-over for the animated character Fred the Flourgrader; he continued as the voice until 1983.

In a change from his usual comedic roles, Le Mesurier portrayed the Reverend Jonathan Ives in Jacques Tourneur's 1965 science fiction film, City Under the Sea, before returning to comedy in Where the Spies Are, a comedy-adventure film directed by Val Guest, which starred David Niven. In 1966 Le Mesurier also played the role of Colonel Maynard in the ITV sitcom George and the Dragon, with Sid James and Peggy Mount. The programme ran to four series between 1966 and 1968, totalling 26 episodes. He also took a role in four episodes of a Coronation Street spin-off series, Pardon the Expression, in which he starred opposite Arthur Lowe.

==== 1968–1977 ====
In 1968 Le Mesurier was offered a role in a new BBC situation comedy playing the upper-middle-class Sergeant Arthur Wilson in Dad's Army; he was the second choice after Robert Dorning. Le Mesurier was unsure about taking the part as he was finishing the final series of George and the Dragon and did not want another long-term television role. He was persuaded both by an increase in his fee – to £262 10s per episode – and by the casting of his old friend Clive Dunn as Corporal Jones. (Note: £262.50 in 1968 is approximately equivalent to £4,010 in 2025, according to calculations based on Consumer Price Index measure of inflation.) Le Mesurier was initially unsure of how to portray his character, and was advised by series writer Jimmy Perry to make the part his own. Le Mesurier decided to base the character on himself, later writing that "I thought, why not just be myself, use an extension of my own personality and behave rather as I had done in the army? So I always left a button or two undone, and had the sleeve of my battle dress slightly turned up. I spoke softly, issued commands as if they were invitations (the sort not likely to be accepted) and generally assumed a benign air of helplessness". Perry later observed that "we wanted Wilson to be the voice of sanity; he has become John".

Le Mesurier (second from left) with the cast of Dad's Army, from the 1971 Christmas Special Battle of the Giants!

Nicholas de Jongh, in a tribute written after Le Mesurier's death, suggested that it was in the role of Wilson that Le Mesurier became a star. His interaction with Arthur Lowe's character Captain George Mainwaring was described by The Times as "a memorable part of one of television's most popular shows". Tise Vahimagi, writing for the British Film Institute's Screenonline, agreed, and commented that "it was the hesitant exchanges of one-upmanship between Le Mesurier's Wilson, a figure of delicate gentility, and Arthur Lowe's pompous, middle class platoon leader Captain Mainwaring, that added to its finest moments". Le Mesurier enjoyed making the series, particularly the fortnight the cast would spend in Thetford each year filming the outside scenes. The programme lasted for nine series over nine years, and covered eighty episodes, ending in 1977.

During the filming of the series in 1969, Le Mesurier was flown to Venice over a series of weekends to appear in the film Midas Run, an Alf Kjellin-directed crime film that also starred Richard Crenna, Anne Heywood and Fred Astaire. Le Mesurier became friends with Astaire during the filming and they often dined together in a local cafe while watching horse-racing on television. In 1971 Norman Cohen directed a feature film of Dad's Army; Le Mesurier also appeared as Wilson in a stage adaptation, which toured the UK in 1975–76. Following the success of Dad's Army, Le Mesurier recorded the single "A Nightingale Sang in Berkeley Square" with "Hometown" on the reverse side (the latter with Arthur Lowe). This, and an album, Dad's Army, featuring the whole cast, was released on the Warner label in 1975.

In between his performances in Dad's Army, Le Mesurier acted in films, including the role of the prison governor opposite Noël Coward in the 1969 Peter Collinson-directed The Italian Job. The cinema historian Amy Sargeant likened Le Mesurier's role to the "mild demeanour" of his Sergeant Wilson character. In 1970, Le Mesurier appeared in Ralph Thomas's Doctor in Trouble as the purser; he also made an appearance in Vincente Minnelli's On a Clear Day You Can See Forever, a romantic fantasy musical.

In 1971 Le Mesurier played the lead role in Dennis Potter's television play Traitor, in which he portrayed a "boozy British aristocrat who became a spy for the Soviets"; his performance won him a British Academy of Film and Television Arts "Best Television Actor" award. Writing for the British Film Institute, Sergio Angelini considered "Le Mesurier is utterly compelling throughout in an atypical role". Chris Dunkley, writing in The Times, described the performance as "a superbly persuasive portrait, made vividly real by one of the best performances Mr Mesurier [sic] has ever given". The reviewer for The Sunday Times agreed, saying that Le Mesurier, "after a lifetime supporting other actors with the strength of a pit-prop, gets the main part; he looks, sounds and feels exactly right". Reviewing for The Guardian, Nancy Banks-Smith called the role "his Hamlet", and said that it was worth waiting for. Although delighted to have won the award, Le Mesurier commented that the aftermath proved "something of an anticlimax. No exciting offers of work came in".

Le Mesurier made a cameo appearance in Val Guest's 1972 sex comedy Au Pair Girls, and starred alongside Warren Mitchell and Dandy Nichols in Bob Kellett's The Alf Garnett Saga. In 1974 he played a police inspector in a similar Val Guest comedy, Confessions of a Window Cleaner, alongside Robin Askwith and Antony Booth. The following year he also narrated Bod, an animated children's programme from the BBC; there were thirteen episodes in total.

==== 1977–1983 ====
In 1977 Le Mesurier portrayed Jacob Marley in a BBC television adaptation of A Christmas Carol, which starred Michael Hordern as Ebenezer Scrooge; Sergio Angelini, writing for the British Film Institute about Le Mesurier's portrayal, considered that "although never frightening, he does exert a strong sense of melancholy, his every move and inflection seemingly tinged with regret and remorse". In 1979 he portrayed Sir Gawain in Walt Disney's Unidentified Flying Oddball, directed by Russ Mayberry, and co-starring Dennis Dugan, Jim Dale and Kenneth More. The film, an adaptation of Mark Twain's novel A Connecticut Yankee in King Arthur's Court, was hailed by Time Out as "an intelligent film with a cohesive plot and an amusing script" and cited it as "one of the better Disney attempts to hop on the sci-fi bandwagon". The reviewers praised the cast, particularly Kenneth More's Arthur and Le Mesurier's Gawain, which they said were "rather touchingly portrayed as friends who have grown old together".

Le Mesurier played The Wise Old Bird in the 1980 BBC Radio 4 series The Hitchhiker's Guide to the Galaxy and appeared on the same station as Bilbo Baggins in the 1981 radio version of The Lord of the Rings. In the spring of 1980 he took the role of David Bliss alongside Constance Cummings—as Judith Bliss—in a production of Noël Coward's 1920s play Hay Fever. Writing for The Observer, Robert Cushman thought that Le Mesurier played the role with "deeply grizzled torpor", while Michael Billington, reviewing for The Guardian, saw him as a "grey, gentle wisp of a man, full of half-completed gestures and seraphic smiles".

He took on the role of Father Mowbray in Granada Television's 1981 adaptation of Brideshead Revisited. He guest-starred in episodes of the British comedy television series The Goodies, and in an early episode of Hi-de-Hi!. His final film appearance was also Peter Sellers's final cinema role, The Fiendish Plot of Dr. Fu Manchu, which was completed just months before Sellers's death in July 1980.

In 1982 Le Mesurier reprised the role of Arthur Wilson for It Sticks Out Half a Mile, a radio sequel to Dad's Army, in which Wilson had become the bank manager of the Frambourne-on-Sea branch, while Arthur Lowe's character, Captain George Mainwaring, was trying to apply for a loan to renovate the local pier. The death of Lowe in April 1982 meant that only a pilot episode was recorded, and the project was suspended. It was revived later that year with Lowe's role replaced by two other Dad's Army cast members: Pike, played by Ian Lavender, and Hodges, played by Bill Pertwee. A pilot and twelve episodes were subsequently recorded, and broadcast in 1984. Le Mesurier also teamed up with another ex-Dad's Army colleague, Clive Dunn, to record a novelty single, "There Ain't Much Change from a Pound These Days"/"After All These Years", which had been written by Le Mesurier's stepson, David Malin. The single was released on KA Records in 1982.

He appeared opposite Anthony Hopkins in a four-part television series, A Married Man, in March 1983, before undertaking the narration on the short film The Passionate Pilgrim, an Eric Morecambe vehicle, which was Morecambe's last film before his death.

=== Personal life ===
JOHN LE MESURIER Wishes it to be known that he conked out on November 15th. He sadly misses family and friends.

— Self-penned death notice in The Times, 16 November 1983

In 1939, Le Mesurier accepted a role in the Robert Morley play Goodness, How Sad!, directed by June Melville—whose father Frederick owned several theatres, including the Lyceum, Prince's and Brixton. Melville and Le Mesurier soon began a romance, and were married in April 1940. Le Mesurier was conscripted into the army in September 1940; after his demobilisation in 1946, he discovered that his wife had become an alcoholic: "She became careless about appointments and haphazard professionally". As a result, the couple separated and were divorced in 1949.

In June 1947, Le Mesurier went with fellow actor Geoffrey Hibbert to the Players' Theatre in London, where among the performers was Hattie Jacques. Le Mesurier and Jacques began to see each other regularly; Le Mesurier was still married, albeit estranged from his wife. In 1949, when his divorce came through, Jacques proposed to Le Mesurier, asking him, "Don't you think it's about time we got married?" The couple married in November 1949 and had two sons, Robin and Kim.

Jacques began an affair in 1962 with her driver, John Schofield, who gave her the attention and support that Le Mesurier did not. When Jacques decided to move Schofield into the family home, Le Mesurier moved into a separate room and tried to repair the marriage. He later commented about this period: "I could have walked out, but, whatever my feelings, I loved Hattie and the children and I was certain—I had to be certain—that we could repair the damage." The affair caused a downturn in his health; he collapsed on holiday in Tangier in 1963 and was hospitalised in Gibraltar. He returned to London to find the situation between his wife and her lover was unchanged, which caused a relapse.

During the final stages of the breakdown of his marriage, Le Mesurier met Joan Malin at the Establishment club in Soho in 1963. The following year he moved out of his marital house and that day proposed to Joan, who accepted his offer. Le Mesurier allowed Jacques to bring a divorce suit on grounds of his own infidelity, to ensure that the press blamed him for the break-up, thus avoiding any negative publicity for Jacques. Le Mesurier and Malin married in March 1966. A few months after they were married, Joan began a relationship with Tony Hancock and left Le Mesurier to move in with the comedian. Hancock was a self-confessed alcoholic by this time, and was verbally and physically abusive to Joan during their relationship.

After a year together, with Hancock's violence towards her worsening, Joan attempted suicide; she subsequently realised that she could no longer live with Hancock and returned to her husband. Despite this, Le Mesurier remained friends with Hancock, calling him "a comic of true genius, capable of great warmth and generosity, but a tormented and unhappy man". Without Le Mesurier's knowledge, Joan resumed her affair with Hancock and, when the comic moved to Australia in 1968, she planned to follow him if he was able to overcome his alcoholism. She abandoned these plans and remained with Le Mesurier after Hancock committed suicide on 25 June 1968.

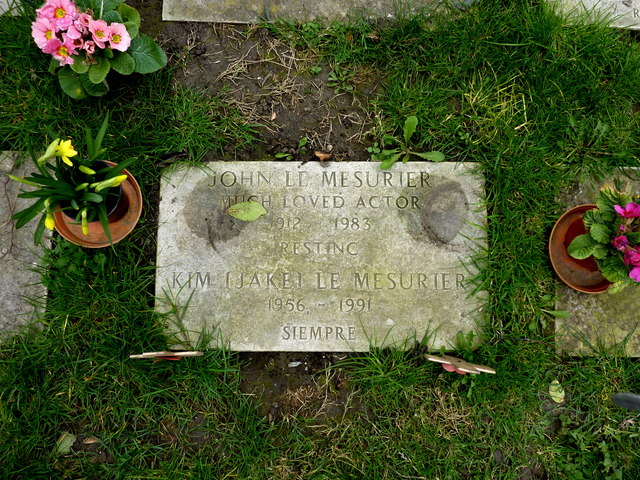
The grave of Le Mesurier and his son Kim at St George's Church, Ramsgate, Kent

Le Mesurier was a heavy drinker but was never noticeably drunk. In 1977 he collapsed in Australia and flew home, where he was diagnosed with cirrhosis of the liver and ordered to stop drinking. Until then he had not considered himself an alcoholic; he accepted that "it was the cumulative effect over the years that had done the damage". It was a year and a half before he drank alcohol again, when he avoided spirits and drank only beer.

Jacques claimed that his calculated vagueness was the result of his dependence on cannabis, although according to Le Mesurier the drug was not to his taste; he smoked it only during his period of abstinence from alcohol. Le Mesurier's favoured pastime was visiting the jazz clubs around Soho, such as Ronnie Scott's, and he observed that "listening to artists like Bill Evans, Oscar Peterson or Alan Clare always made life seem that little bit brighter".

Towards the end of his life Le Mesurier wrote his autobiography, A Jobbing Actor; the book was published in 1984, after his death. Le Mesurier's health visibly declined from July 1983 when he was hospitalised for a short time after suffering a haemorrhage. When the condition recurred later in the year he was taken to Ramsgate Hospital; after saying to his wife, "It's all been rather lovely", he slipped into a coma and died on 15 November 1983, aged 71. His remains were cremated, and the ashes buried at the Church of St. George the Martyr, Church Hill, Ramsgate. His epitaph reads: "John Le Mesurier. Much loved actor. Resting." His self-penned death notice in The Times of 16 November 1983 stated that he had "conked out" and that he "sadly misses family and friends".

After Le Mesurier's death fellow comedian Eric Sykes commented: "I never heard a bad word said against him. He was one of the great drolls of our time". Le Mesurier's fellow Dad's Army actor Bill Pertwee mourned the loss of his friend, saying, "It's a shattering loss. He was a great professional, very quiet but with a lovely sense of humour". Director Peter Cotes, writing in The Guardian, called him one of Britain's "most accomplished screen character actors", while The Times obituarist observed that he "could lend distinction to the smallest part".

The Guardian reflected on Le Mesurier's popularity, observing that "No wonder so many whose lives were very different from his own came to be so enormously fond of him". A memorial service was held on 16 February 1984 at the "Actors' Church", St Paul's, Covent Garden, at which Bill Pertwee gave the eulogy.

== Approach to acting ==
The character he cumulatively created will be remembered when others more famous are forgotten, not just for the skill of his playing but because he somehow embodied a symbolic British reaction to the whirlpool of the modern world—endlessly perplexed by the dizzying and incoherent pattern of events, but doing his best to ensure that resentment never showed.

— The Guardian, 16 November 1983

Le Mesurier took a relaxed approach to acting, saying, "You know the way you get jobbing gardeners? Well, I'm a jobbing actor ... as long as they pay me I couldn't care less if my name is billed above or below the title". Le Mesurier played a wide range of parts, and became known as "an indispensable figure in the gallery of second-rank players which were the glory of the British film industry in its more prolific days". He felt his characterisations owed "a lot to my customary expression of bewildered innocence" and tried to stress for many of his roles that his parts were those of "a decent chap all at sea in a chaotic world not of his own making".

Philip French of The Observer considered that when playing a representative of bureaucracy, Le Mesurier "registered something ... complex. A feeling of exasperation, disturbance, anxiety [that] constantly lurked behind that handsome bloodhound face". The impression he gave in these roles became an "inimitable brand of bewildered persistence under fire which Le Mesurier made his own". The Times noted of him that although he was best known for his comedic roles, he, "could be equally effective in straight parts", as evidenced by his BAFTA-award-winning role in Traitor. Director Peter Cotes agreed, adding, "he had depths unrealised through the mechanical pieces in which he generally appeared"; while Philip Oakes considered that, "single-handed, he has made more films watchable, even absorbing, than anyone else around".

== Portrayals ==
Le Mesurier's second and third marriages have been the subject of two BBC Four biographical films, the 2008 Hancock and Joan on Joan Le Mesurier's affair with Tony Hancock—with Le Mesurier played by Alex Jennings—and the 2011 Hattie on Jacques's affair with John Schofield—with Le Mesurier played by Robert Bathurst. (Note: Robert Bathurst was subsequently cast to play Sergeant Wilson, Le Mesurier's character in Dad's Army, when UKTV recreated the series' three missing episodes in 2019.) In We're Doomed! The Dad's Army Story, a 2015 comedy drama about the making of Dad's Army, Le Mesurier was portrayed by Julian Sands. Le Mesurier was portrayed by Anton Lesser in the BBC Radio 4 drama Dear Arthur, Love John on 7 May 2012.

== Bibliography ==
- Barry, Michael (1992). From the Palace to the Grove: Michael Barry. London: Royal Television Society. ISBN 978-1-871527-40-7.
- Browning, John Edgar; Picart, Caroline Joan (Kay) (2010). Dracula in Visual Media: film, television, comic book and electronic game appearances, 1921–2010. Jefferson, North Carolina: McFarland & Company. ISBN 978-0-7864-3365-0.
- Castell, David (1984). Richard Attenborough: a pictorial film biography. London: The Bodley Head. ISBN 978-0-370-30986-6.
- Dimmitt, Richard Bertrand (1967). An Actor Guide to the Talkies: A comprehensive listing of 8,000 feature-length films from January, 1949, until December, 1964. Lanham, Maryland: Scarecrow Press. OCLC 833091.
- Evans, Peter (1980). The Mask Behind the Mask. London: Severn House Publishers. ISBN 978-0-7278-0688-8.
- Foster, Andy; Furst, Steve (1996). Radio Comedy 1938 – 1968. London: Virgin Books. ISBN 978-0-86369-960-3.
- Halliwell, Leslie (1994). Halliwell's Film Guide. New York: Harper Perennial. ISBN 978-0-06-271573-9.
- Harvey, Stephen (1990). Directed by Vincente Minnelli. New York: Museum of Modern Art. ISBN 978-0-06-016263-4.
- Le Mesurier, Joan (1988). Lady Don't Fall Backwards: A memoir dedicated to Tony Hancock and John Le Mesurier. London: Sidgwick & Jackson. ISBN 978-0-283-99664-1.
- Le Mesurier, John (1984). A Jobbing Actor. London: Elm Tree Books. ISBN 978-0-241-11063-8.
- Lloyd, Ann; Robinson, David (1988). Seventy Years at the Movies. New York: Crescent Books. ISBN 978-0-517-66213-7.
- Maltin, Leonard; Anderson, Cathleen; Sader, Luke (2003). Leonard Maltin's Movie & Video Guide 2004. New York: Plume. ISBN 978-0-452-28478-4.
- Mayer, Geoff (2003). Guide to British Cinema. Westport, Connecticut: Greenwood Publishing Group. ISBN 978-0-313-30307-4.
- McCann, Graham (2001). Dad's Army. London: Fourth Estate. ISBN 978-1-84115-308-7.
- McCann, Graham (2010). Do You Think That's Wise? The life of John Le Mesurier. London: Aurum Press. ISBN 978-1-84513-583-6.
- Merriman, Andy (2007). Hattie: The authorised biography of Hattie Jacques. London: Aurum Press. ISBN 978-1-84513-257-6.
- Pertwee, Bill (2009). Dad's Army: The Making of a Television Legend. London: Anova Books. ISBN 978-1-84486-105-7.
- Sargeant, Amy (2005). British Cinema: A Critical History. London: BFI Publishing. ISBN 978-1-84457-066-9.
- Slide, Anthony (1996). Some Joe You Don't Know: An American Biographical Guide to 100 British Television Personalities. Westport, Connecticut: Greenwood Publishing Group. ISBN 978-0-313-29550-8.
- Umland, Rebecca A.; Umland, Samuel J. (1996). The Use of Arthurian Legend in Hollywood Film: From Connecticut Yankees to Fisher Kings. Westport, Connecticut: Greenwood Publishing Group. ISBN 978-0-313-29798-4.
