= Hole in the Ground =

(The) Hole in the Ground may refer to:

- "Hole in the Ground", a 2025 song by Inhaler
- "The Hole in the Ground" (song), a 1962 comic song by Bernard Cribbins
- Hole-in-the-Ground, a crater in Lake County, Oregon, U.S.
- The Hole in the Ground (1962 film), a British drama-documentary film
- The Hole in the Ground (2019 film), a horror film produced in Ireland, Belgium and Finland
- A sinkhole

== See also ==
- " From a Hole in the Ground", a song from The Sword of God (album) (2001) by Quasi
