= Zena Marshall =

British actress (1926–2009)

- Born: Zena Moyra Marshall; 1 January 1926; Nairobi, Kenya
- Died: 10 July 2009 (aged 83); London, England
- Occupation: Actress
- Years active: 1945–1967
- Spouses: Paul Adam (m. 1947; div. 1953); Alexander Ward (m. 1967; div. 1969); Ivan Foxwell (m. 1991; died 2002)

Zena Moyra Marshall (1 January 1926 – 10 July 2009) was a British actress of film and television, best known for her appearances as Miss Taro in Dr. No (1962) and as Countess Ponticelli in Those Magnificent Men in Their Flying Machines (1965).

== Early life and education ==
Marshall was born in Nairobi, Kenya, to parents of English, Irish and French descent. After her father's death and her mother's remarriage, she was brought up in Leicestershire, England. Marshall attended St Mary's, Ascot, and trained at the Royal Academy of Dramatic Art (RADA).

== Career ==
Marshall worked with the Entertainments National Service Association (ENSA) during the Second World War. Marshall first acted on stage. Her film career began with a small role in Caesar and Cleopatra (1945), with Claude Rains and Vivien Leigh. Her exotic looks resulted in her being cast in "ethnic" roles, such as Asian women, including her role as the Chinese character Miss Taro, in the first James Bond film, Dr. No (1962). She also appeared in Those Magnificent Men in Their Flying Machines (1965) as the Countess Ponticelli, and made numerous television appearances. Her last film performance was in The Terrornauts in 1967.

== Personal life and death ==
Marshall married bandleader Paul Adam in January 1946; they divorced in 1953, owing to his "misconduct" with a woman referred to only as "Miss X". She later wed and divorced Alexander "Reggie" Ward, before her final marriage to film producer Ivan Foxwell. He died in 2002. Marshall died of cancer on 10 July 2009, aged 83. Her gravesite is in St Thomas a Becket churchyard, Skeffington, Leicestershire.

== Filmography ==
=== Film ===
| Year | Title | Role | Notes |
|---|---|---|---|
| 1945 | Caesar and Cleopatra | Lady-in-Waiting | Uncredited |
| 1947 | The End of the River | Sante | |
| 1948 | So Evil My Love | Lisette | |
| 1948 | Snowbound | Italian Girl | |
| 1948 | Miranda | Secretary | |
| 1948 | Good-Time Girl | Annie Farrell | |
| 1948 | Sleeping Car to Trieste | Suzanne | |
| 1949 | The Bad Lord Byron | An Italian Woman | Uncredited |
| 1949 | Marry Me! | Marcelle Duclos | |
| 1949 | Helter Skelter | Giselle | |
| 1949 | The Lost People | Anna | |
| 1949 | Meet Simon Cherry | Lisa Colville | |
| 1950 | Morning Departure Operation Disaster (US) | The Wren | |
| 1950 | So Long at the Fair | Nina | |
| 1950 | Soho Conspiracy | Dora Scala | |
| 1950 | Dark Interval | Sonia Jordan | |
| 1951 | Hell Is Sold Out | Honeychild | |
| 1952 | Blind Man's Bluff | Christine Stevens | |
| 1952 | The Caretaker's Daughter | Fritzi Villiers | |
| 1953 | Deadly Nightshade | Ann Farrington | |
| 1953 | Men Against the Sun | Elizabeth | |
| 1954 | The Scarlet Web | Laura Vane | |
| 1954 | The Embezzler | Mrs. Forrest | |
| 1955 | Three Cases of Murder | Beautiful Blonde | (segment "Lord Mountdrago"), Uncredited |
| 1956 | Bermuda Affair | Chris Walters | |
| 1956 | My Wife's Family | Hilda | |
| 1957 | Let's Be Happy | Helene | |
| 1958 | Dial 999 (TV series) ('Fashions in Crime', episode) | Laura Harris | |
| 1960 | A Story of David: The Hunted | Naomi | |
| 1962 | Crosstrap | Rina | |
| 1962 | Dr. No | Miss Taro | |
| 1962 | Backfire! | Pauline Logan | Edgar Wallace Mysteries |
| 1963 | The Scales of Justice | Thelma Sinclair | |
| 1964 | The Verdict | Carola | Edgar Wallace Mysteries |
| 1965 | Those Magnificent Men in Their Flying Machines | Countess Sofia Ponticelli | |
| 1967 | The Terrornauts | Sandy Lund | (final film role) |

== Television ==
| Year | Title | Role | Notes |
|---|---|---|---|
| 1950 | The Adventures of Sir Percy Howsey | Margueritte | TV short |
| 1952 | The Inch Man | Helen Anastiadi | Episode: "The Quiet Voice" |
| 1952 | Sunday Night Theatre | Catherine | Episode: "The Portugal Lady" |
| 1953 | Your Favorite Story | | Episode: "Work of Art" |
| 1954 | Liebelei | Mitzi Schlager | TV film |
| 1955 | Saber of London | Audrey Lipton | Episode: "The Serpent Beneath" |
| 1956 | Colonel March of Scotland Yard | Madeleine | Episode: "The Silent Vow" |
| 1957 | O.S.S. | Lucille Genet | Episode: "Operation Flint Axe" |
| 1958 | African Patrol | Stella Stevens | Episode: "No Place to Hide" |
| 1958 | The Invisible Man | Tania | Episode: "The Locked Room" |
| 1960–1964 | Danger Man | Dr. LeClair, Mrs. Ramfi, Nadia | Episodes: "The Leak", "Find and Return", "Fish on the Hook" |
| 1962 | Sir Francis Drake | Maria | Episode: "The Bridge" |
| 1962 | Richard the Lionheart | Zara | Episode: "The Challenge" |
| 1962 | Man of the World | Madame Thiboeuf | Episode: "Death of a Conference" |
| 1963 | The Human Jungle | Vera Barclay | Episode: "Over and Out" |
| 1963 | The Sentimental Agent | Melina, Rita | Episodes: "A Little Sweetness and Light", "A Box of Tricks" |
| 1964 | Ghost Squad | Yvonne | Episode: "Dead Men Don't Drive" |
| 1965 | Dixon of Dock Green | Carol Wright | Episode: "Find the Lady" |
| 1965 | Public Eye | Jean Lawford | Episode: "You Have to Draw the Line Somewhere" |
| 1966 | Court Martial | Mara | Episode: "Let Slip the Dogs of War" |
