= Nudist Paradise =

1959 British film by Charles Saunders

- US theatrical release poster
- Directed by: Charles Saunders
- Written by: Leslie Bell; Denise Kaye
- Produced by: Nat Miller; Frank Bevis
- Starring: Anita Love; Carl Conway
- Cinematography: Henry Hall
- Edited by: Helen Wiggins
- Music by: Maurice Pelling
- Production company: Orb International
- Distributed by: Orb
- Release date: February 1959
- Running time: 72 mins
- Country: United Kingdom
- Language: English
- Budget: £15,000

Nudist Paradise (US: Nature's Paradise) is a 1959 British film directed by Charles Saunders and starring Anita Love and Carl Conway. It was written by Leslie Bell and Denise Kaye. It was the first British nudist film.

== Plot ==
Joan Stanton spends her weekends at the Spielplatz nudist camp, where she is admired by American art student Mike Malone. They become engaged and are elected to represent the club at the Naturist World Congress at Woburn Abbey. They marry and have a child.

== Cast ==
- Anita Love as Joan Stanton
- Carl Conway as Mike Malone
- Katy Cashfield as Pat Beatty
- Dennis Carnell as Jimmy Ross
- Celia Hewitt as interviewer
- Emma Young as receptionist
- Walter Randall as camp warden

== Production ==
The film was shot on location at Britain's then leading naturist club, Spielplatz in St Albans, whose owners Charles and Dorothy Macaskie make cameo appearances.

The film's "Miss Venus" contest was a mock recreation of Spielplatz's real annual August Bank Holiday event. The Macaskies' daughter, Iseult—herself a previous winner—demonstrated the required poses to the actresses and, on screen, crowned Katy Cashfield as the contest winner.

To satisfy the strict legal and moral standards of the time, the female stars were required to shave off their pubic hair, ensuring that no "full frontals" appeared on screen—a condition that helped the film secure an 'A' (Adult) certificate from the British Board of Film Classification.

== Reception ==
=== Box office ===
The film was a success at the box office recouping its cost in a matter of weeks; it inspired a number of similar films set in nudist camps.

Kine Weekly wrote: "Orb's Nudist Paradise has been doing very well in its first engagements in the U.S. In the 483 seater Studio cinema, Philadelphia, it took a record 12,000 dollars in the first six days and, in San Diego, the first four days were 14,000 dollars."

=== Critical ===
The Monthly Film Bulletin wrote: "The story, dialogue and performances are as inept as in most nudist productions, but Nudist Paradise, proudly introduced as the first British film on the subject, is at least in better physical condition than the pre-war productions we have recently seen. The sole attractions of Spielplatz appear to be a pool, a badminton court and a trampoline, each shown at exhausting length. The story is told in flashback by a woman interviewer and also by an off-screen male commentator, who at one point interviews a character in the film. Other surprises include a Miss Venus contest in which half-a-dozen girls each go through the same six poses – ranging from "Sports Girl" to "Psyche at the Bath" – one after the other; and a camp fire sing-song in which a single harmonica on the screen becomes a guitar band with a rock 'n' roll style choir on the sound track. The editing, even for this kind of film, is remarkably incompetent; and the lingering undressing and bedroom scenes and the dialogue's doubles entendres, not all of which can be entirely accidental, make the film's motives rather suspect."

Variety wrote: "There's nothing objectionable about Nudist Paradise. It is just trite, and rather stupid. ... it is simply a piece of unwieldy propaganda for naturism, which will appeal only to sun-worshippers and the curious, but which has obvious angles of exploitation. ... Helen Wiggins' editing is erratic and, in juxtaposition to some stilted dialog, occasionally raises unintended yocks."

Sight and Sound wrote: "Romance in the raw, and as tedious in its moments of deliberate salacity as it is awesomely incompetent in its making. British, and apparently proud of it."

In The British 'B' Film, Chibnall and McFarlane wrote that in 1959–1960 "the fledgling British cinema of exploitation was beginning to flap its wings, encouraged by liberal classifications from the BBFC, which gave ‘A’ certificates to ‘naturist’ films including Nudist Paradise ... filmed extravagantly in Eastman Color and 'Nudiscope' with an on-screen endorsement from the Duke of Bedford."
