= No Exit (1930 film) =

1930 film

- Directed by: Charles Saunders
- Written by: Charles Saunders
- Produced by: Charles Saunders
- Starring: John Stuart; Muriel Angelus; James Fenton
- Cinematography: Henry Harris
- Production company: Warner Brothers
- Distributed by: Warner Brothers
- Release date: July 1930
- Running time: 69 minutes
- Country: United Kingdom
- Language: English

No Exit is a 1930 British romantic comedy film directed by Charles Saunders and starring John Stuart, Muriel Angelus and James Fenton. The plot involves a comedy of mistaken identity. The film was a quota quickie made by the British subsidiary of Warner Brothers at Welwyn Studios.

== Cast ==
- John Stuart as Bill Alden
- Muriel Angelus as Ann Ansell
- James Fenton as Mr. Ansell
- Janet Alexander as Mrs. Ansell
- John Rowal as Harry Matthews

== Bibliography ==
- Chibnall, Steve. Quota Quickies: The Birth of the British 'B' Film. British Film Institute, 2007.
- Low, Rachael. Filmmaking in 1930s Britain. George Allen & Unwin, 1985.
- Wood, Linda. British Films, 1927–1939. British Film Institute, 1986.
