= The Scarlet Web =

1954 British film by Charles Saunders

- Directed by: Charles Saunders
- Written by: Doreen Montgomery
- Produced by: Frank Bevis
- Starring: Griffith Jones; Hazel Court; Zena Marshall
- Cinematography: Hone Glendinning
- Edited by: Jack Slade
- Production company: Fortress Film Productions
- Distributed by: Eros Films
- Release date: June 1954
- Running time: 63 minutes
- Country: United Kingdom
- Language: English

The Scarlet Web is a 1954 British second feature ('B') crime film directed by Charles Saunders and starring Griffith Jones, Hazel Court and Zena Marshall. It was written by Doreen Montgomery.

== Plot ==
Jake Winter is just released from prison, where he has been working undercover for an insurance company, in cooperation with the police. He is approached by Laura Vane who asks him to steal a letter from a blackmailer who has targeted her husband. At her apartment Winter is drugged, and on waking finds himself alone with the body of a woman. The police suspect him of murder. Winter's boss at the insurance company, Susan Honeywell, believes he is innocent. They find a connection between Vane and the dead woman's husband Charles Dexter. Honeywell visits Dexter but is drugged and left in a kitchen with the gas on. The police and Winter arrive just in time to rescue her and arrest Vane and Dexter.

== Cast ==
- Griffith Jones as Jake Winter
- Hazel Court as Susan Honeywell
- Zena Marshall as Laura Vane
- Robert Percival as Charles Dexter
- Molly Raynor as Miss Riggs
- Ronnie Stevens as Simpson
- John Fitzgerald as Bert
- Stuart Douglass as Cyril
- Michael Balfour as barman
- David Stoll as Alphonse, the hairdresser

== Production ==
The film was made at Walton Studios with some location shooting in London. Its sets were designed by the art director John Stoll.

== Critical reception ==
Monthly Film Bulletin said "Formula detective story, made with modest competence. The basic fact that the police will believe Winter murdered an unknown woman for £50 seems improbable; this apart, however, the story is credible and no loose ends are left."

Kine Weekly wrote "Compact, disarmingly inconsequential romantic comedy crime melodrama. ... The picture never takes itself too seriously, and its strong sense of humour, cultivated by Hazel Court and Griffith Jones, who make an engaging team as Susan and Jake, effectively cloaks its incredibilities without robbing it of penultimate suspense."

British Sound Films: The Studio Years 1928–1959 David Quinlan rated the film as "average", writing: "Very familiar story but more professionally put together than most of its kind."

Chibnall and McFarlane in The British 'B' Film wrote: "Leavened with touches of wry, wise-cracking humour, nothing in the film would have been out of place in a hardboiled flick from America except the English accents and the backgrounds."
