= Spielplatz =

Naturist resort in United Kingdom

Coordinates: 51°43′00″N 0°21′25″W

Spielplatz (German for playground) is the longest-operating naturist resort in United Kingdom, and consists of 12 acres (4.9 ha) located in the village of Bricket Wood, in the English county of Hertfordshire. As of 2021, the resort consists of 65 houses.

== History ==
Spielplatz was founded in 1929 by Charles Macaskie and his wife Dorothy. They moved from London into a tent on an area of virgin woodland they purchased near Bricket Wood. They called their camp the Green Monastery and a Play Place (Spielplatz).

They were joined by other couples and individuals on weekends. Among their visitors until 1947 was Ross Nichols, founder of the Order of Bards, Ovates and Druids. In turn he attracted both fellow Druids and Gerald Gardner, who later established his first coven at Bricket Wood in his development of Wicca as a modern religion.

It was at Spielplatz that Ross Nichols first met Gerald Gardner. Spielplatz has featured in TV and films such as Naked as Nature Intended (1961) starring club member Pamela Green, Nudist Memories (1959), Nudist Paradise (1959), and Confetti (2006).

In 1956, The Naturist Ltd. published Nudist Life at Spielplatz, "The Story of a Modern Experiment in the Art of Living" by Charles Sennet, with a supplement of photographs by Stephen Glass.

In 1957, the documentary series Out of Step on ITV, the investigative reporter Dan Farson visited Spielplatz Naturist Club in Bricket Wood and interviewed Charles Macaskie, Mrs. Macaskie, and their daughter Iseult. It is claimed the programme was the first showing of a naked woman on British television.

== See also ==
- List of social nudity places in Europe
