= Return to Yesterday =

1940 British film by Robert Stevenson

- Original UK film poster
- Directed by: Robert Stevenson
- Screenplay by: Margaret Kennedy; Angus MacPhail; Roland Pertwee; Robert Stevenson
- Based on: Goodness, How Sad by Robert Morley
- Produced by: S.C. Balcon
- Starring: Clive Brook; Anna Lee; Dame May Whitty
- Cinematography: Ronald Neame
- Edited by: Charles Saunders
- Music by: Ernest Irving
- Production company: Ealing Studios
- Distributed by: ABFD
- Release date: 9 March 1940 (UK)
- Running time: 69 minutes
- Country: United Kingdom
- Language: English

Return to Yesterday is a 1940 British comedy-drama film directed by Robert Stevenson and starring Clive Brook and Anna Lee. It was written by Margaret Kennedy, Angus MacPhail|, Roland Pertwee and Stevenson based on Robert Morley's 1937 play Goodness, How Sad. The film was made at Ealing Studios.

== Synopsis ==
A British Hollywood star goes AWOL on his way back to Hollywood after a visit in London. The reason is an impromptu decision to leave the train on his way to the ocean liner in Southampton when it passes the seaside resort where he once worked as a struggling actor at a local theatre. Without anyone but his old landlady realising who he is, he then agrees to appear in latest production of a travelling repertory theatre company when it loses its leading man a few days before the premiere, and falls in love with the leading lady.

== Cast ==
- Clive Brook as Robert Maine
- Anna Lee as Carol Sands
- Dame May Whitty as Mrs. Emily Truscott
- Hartley Power as Regan
- Milton Rosmer as Fred Sambourne
- David Tree as Peter Thropp
- Olga Lindo as Grace Sambourne
- Garry Marsh as Charlie Miller
- Arthur Margetson as Osbert
- Elliott Mason as Mrs Priskin
- O. B. Clarence as Truscott
- David Horne as Morrison
- Frank Pettingell as Prendergast
- Ludwig Stössel as Captain Angst
- Wally Patch as night watchman
- H. F. Maltby as inspector
- Mary Jerrold as old lady at station
- Alf Goddard as attendant
- John Turnbull as stationmaster
- Patric Curwen as Jim, the guard
- Eliot Makeham as Fred Grover
- Mollie Rankin as Christine Lawford
- Bruce Seton as journalist

== Reception ==
The Monthly Film Bulletin wrote: "The plot is by no means original, and the development follows conventional lines. The ultimate outcome is never in doubt. Perhaps because of the story's superficiality the cast is not seen to great advantage. Clive Brook strolls pleasantly enough through a part which makes practically no demands on his acting powers. Anna Lee is somewhat colourless as Carol. The experienced supporting players do their best with the material given them. The theatrical atmosphere is well caught and the seaside town and boarding-house backgrounds are effective and familiar."

Kine Weekly wrote: "A friendly story with excellent holding performance by Clive Brook and human angle."

Picturegoer wrote: "Anna Lee is pretty but rather colourless as the heroine, but David Tree scores as the hero. Supporting character roles are well played."

Allmovie called it "A delightful film that begs to be rediscovered."
