= A Time to Kill (1955 film) =

British film by Charles Saunders

- Opening titles
- Directed by: Charles Saunders
- Written by: Doreen Montgomery
- Produced by: Clive Nicholas
- Starring: Jack Watling; Rona Anderson; John Horsley; Russell Napier
- Cinematography: James Wilson
- Edited by: Jack Slade
- Music by: Frank Chacksfield
- Production company: Fortress Film Productions
- Distributed by: Associated British-Pathé
- Release date: November 1955
- Running time: 65 minutes
- Country: United Kingdom
- Language: English

A Time to Kill is a 1955 British second feature ('B') crime film directed by Charles Saunders and starring Jack Watling, Rona Anderson, John Horsley, Russell Napier, Kenneth Kent, and John Le Mesurier. It was written by Doreen Montgomery.

== Plot ==
The film opens with Florence Cole, the wife of local doctor Julian Cole, handing over money to a man in a mask. When she returns home, Peter Hastings, with whom she is romantically involved, telephones Dr. Cole to say that he and his friend Madeline Tilliard have been poisoned by strychnine in their drinks. Madeline dies. Peter recovers, and is suspected of Madeline's murder.

At Peter's house, Dr Cole finds love letters between Florance and Peter, which confirm his suspicions of an affaire.

Florence tells local reporter Dennis Willows that Madeline and an unknown man were blackmailing her. That night Florence takes another payment to the man in mask. She tells the man she recognises him. He strikes her and she falls and dies. Peter's ex-fiancée Sallie sets out to find the male blackmailer.

== Cast ==
- Jack Watling as Dennis Willows
- Rona Anderson as Sallie Harbord
- John Horsley as Peter Hastings
- Russell Napier as Inspector Simmons
- Kenneth Kent as Dr. Julian Cole
- Mary Jones as Florence Cole
- Alastair Hunter as Sergeant Thorpe
- Joan Hickson as Miss Edinger
- John Le Mesurier as Phineas Tilliard
- Helene Burls as Mrs James
- Alan Robinson as porter
- June Ashley as Madeline Tilliard
- Bartlett Mullins as coroner
- Humphrey Morton as usher
- Dandy Nichols as waitress
- Hugh Stewart as policeman

== Critical reception ==
The Monthly Film Bulletin wrote: "An unpretentious mystery story which begins slowly but works up to an unexpected and effective climax. Character drawing is fair, with a reliable performance by Russell Napier as the police inspector, and there are a few tense moments."

Kine Weekly wrote: "Tin-pot British whodunnit ...leading and supporting characters, taken from stock only lightly dusted, are clumsily drawn and deployed. Lack of finesse robs it of surprise and suspense, and it slowly peters out."

In British Sound Films: The Studio Years 1928–1959 David Quinlan rated the film as "average", writing: "Complex thriller is very average, but does muster a few moments of tension."
