= Hancock and Joan =

- Genre: Biographical drama
- Written by: Richard Cottan
- Directed by: Richard Laxton
- Starring: Ken Stott; Maxine Peake; Alex Jennings
- Country of origin: United Kingdom
- Original language: English

Production
- Executive producer: Patrick Spence
- Producer: Simon Heath
- Running time: 90 minutes
- Production company: World Productions

Original release
- Network: BBC Four
- Release: 26 March 2008

Hancock and Joan is a 2008 British biographical television film based on the affair between the comedian Tony Hancock and Joan Le Mesurier, the third wife of actor John Le Mesurier. It was first transmitted on BBC Four on 26 March 2008 as part of the Curse of Comedy season. It features Ken Stott and Maxine Peake as the title characters, and Alex Jennings as John. Written by Richard Cottan, directed by Richard Laxton and produced by Simon Heath, it was made by World Productions for the BBC.

The drama's first broadcast was watched by 709,000 viewers, making it the most watched programme on BBC Four that week. It was nominated in three categories at the 2009 British Academy Television Awards: best actor for Ken Stott, best actress for Maxine Peake and best single drama.

== Cast ==
- Ken Stott as Tony Hancock
- Maxine Peake as Joan le Mesurier
- Alex Jennings as John le Mesurier
- George Costigan as George
- Olivia Colman as Marion
- Lesley Nicol as Nellie
- Tom Georgeson as Fred
- Peter Sullivan as Edward Joffe

== Filming locations ==
Filming was conducted at Broadstairs with its sandy beaches, promenade and sea views, and traditional ice cream parlour Morelli's was also used as a filming location. Other parts of docu-drama were filmed on location around Ramsgate in Chapel Place, South View Road, and Nelson Crescent.
