= The Narrowing Circle =

1956 British film by Charles Saunders

- Directed by: Charles Saunders
- Written by: Doreen Montgomery
- Based on: The Narrowing Circle by Julian Symons
- Produced by: Frank Bevis
- Starring: Paul Carpenter; Hazel Court; Russell Napier
- Cinematography: Jonah Jones
- Edited by: Margery Saunders
- Music by: Reg Owen
- Production company: Fortress Film Productions
- Distributed by: Eros Films
- Release date: February 1956
- Running time: 66 minutes
- Country: United Kingdom
- Language: English

The Narrowing Circle is a 1956 British second feature ('B') crime film directed by Charles Saunders and starring Paul Carpenter, Hazel Court and Russell Napier. It was written by Doreen Montgomery based on the 1954 novel of the same title by Julian Symons. A crime writer finds himself framed for murder.

== Plot ==
Crime writer Dave Nelson is having a bad day – ordered to share his office with ambitious rival Rosemary Speed, brushed off by the pretty food editor Laura Martin, and passed over as editor of a new magazine in favour of handsome Bill Strayte, who enjoys the affections of Miss Martin. Fed up, Nelson goes to a bar, meets a woman named Christy, and gets stinking drunk. Christy escorts Nelson to a fleabag hotel and checks him in.

The next morning, a hung-over Nelson awakens to discover himself alone in the room. Barely able to function, he manages to find his way home, and finds Strayte lying on his apartment floor, dead. Nelson dials 999. When the police arrive Inspector Crambo hears Nelson's alibi and holds off making an arrest – for now. However, when Crambo is unable to verify the existence of Christy or other details of Nelson's story, things begin to look bad. Nelson enlists his new office-mate Miss Speed to help him discover who killed Strayte.

== Cast ==
- Paul Carpenter as Dave Nelson
- Hazel Court as Rosemary Speed
- Russell Napier as Sir Henry Dimmock
- Trevor Reid as Inspector "Dumb" Crambo
- Paula Byrne as Laura Martin
- June Ashley as Christy
- Ferdy Mayne as Bill Strayte
- Basil Dignam as George Pacey
- Ronnie Stevens as Jimmy
- James Booth (uncredited)
- Hugh Latimer as Charles Pears

== Production ==
The film's sets were designed by the art director Wilfred Arnold.

== Critical reception ==
Kine Weekly wrote: "The acting is a trifle uneven and the same goes for the direction, but a twist ending tips the scales in its favour."

In British Sound Films: The Studio Years 1928–1959 David Quinlan wrote: ''Competently acted 'B' with a lot of plot for its running time.''

Leslie Halliwell said: "Very tolerable mystery which wastes no time and plays fair."
