= Stephen Glass (photographer) =

Hungarian-British photographer

- Born: Budapest, Hungary
- Died: 23 August 1990; Paddington, London, England
- Known for: Nude photography

Stephan Glass, more commonly known as Stephen Glass, was a Hungarian-British photographer best known for his nude studies.

== Early career ==
He was born in Hungary to Jewish parents. After three years of intensive study in commercial art schools in Budapest, he earned his living as a designer, cartoonist, and painter. At the end of the First World War, he left Hungary for Germany, where he worked as art editor for the leading evening newspaper in Berlin His younger brother Zoltán, who moved to Berlin in 1925, founded the advertising photography agency, Reclaphot, and the Autophot agency, which specialised in automotive photography. Together with Peter Petersen, they took photographs for such firms as Daimler-Benz, Fiat and Auto Union. As Hungarian Jews, however, Stephen and Zoltán found working in Germany increasingly problematic and they eventually emigrated to England, where they shared a photography studio, in London.

== Life in London ==
In the 1940s and 1950s, Stephen specialised in photographing nudes for such magazines as Health and Efficiency and The Naturist. In addition, his work regularly featured in continental magazines such as Paris Hollywood, Femina and Modelstudier making him one of the most prominent photographers of the nude at the time. The models, June Palmer and Pamela Green both posed for him, and he frequently used Spielplatz nudist camp in Bricket Wood as a location. In 1950 he photographed the first Miss Venus contest at Spielplatz. It was the year Pamela Green won.

Glass would often use his flat as a studio. It was on Old Church Street, less than a ten-minute walk from his brother's studio on the King's Road, London.

In addition to magazines, his work appeared in a series of books published by The Naturist, such as Pool of Enchantment (1950), Beauty and Naturism, and Sussex Maidens (1949). Stephen Glass died 23 April 1990.

The National Portrait Gallery holds one of his works, a 1930s photo of "Sir Thomas Beecham, 2nd Bt".

== Books published by The Naturist ==
Books published by The Naturist for which Stephen Glass provided the photography.

- Rosemary Andre, My Life Story, The Naturist Ltd, 1945
- Michael Rutherford, British Naturism, The Naturist Ltd, 1946
- Roy Wyatt, Sussex Maidens, The Naturist Ltd, 1949
- Anne Seton, Pool of Enchantment, The Naturist Ltd, 1950
- Charles Sennet, Nudist Life in Spielplatz, The Naturist Ltd, 1956
- Melvyn Oakdale, The Mystery of Naturism, The Naturist Ltd, 1956
- Stewart Douglas, Beauty and Naturism, The Naturist Ltd,
- Ronald Mason, Eve in the Sun, The Naturist Ltd,
- Douglas Stewart, Ideal Manhood, The Naturist Ltd
