= Zoltán Glass =

Hungarian photographer

- Born: 26 April 1903; Budapest, Austria-Hungary
- Died: 24 February 1981 (aged 77); Roquebrune-Cap-Martin, France
- Occupation: Photographer
- Years active: 1930s–1960s

Zoltán Glass (26 April 1903 – 24 February 1981) was a Hungarian photographer. He was one of the renowned photographers of the 20th century.

== Early life ==
Zoltán Glass, who was known to his friends as "Zolly", was born in Budapest, Austria-Hungary on 26 April 1903. Following in his elder brother's footsteps, he began his career as an artist and caricaturist. However, he struggled to make ends meet and took various other jobs to supplement his income, including docker, night watchman, photographic retoucher, and stage designer.

== Early career ==
In 1925, Zoltán moved to Berlin, Germany, where, like his brother Stephen Glass, he established himself as a picture editor at an evening newspaper. He then became a photojournalist at the Berliner Tagblatt. A keen motorsports enthusiast and amateur racer, Zoltán covered Germany's biggest races at the Nürburgring and Avus circuits. In 1930 Zoltán established Reclaphot, a photographic agency that specialised in advertising work, and Autophot, a company dedicated exclusively to automobile photography. His most famous photographs are of the Mercedes-Benz Silver Arrows team, which dominated Grand Prix racing during the mid-1930s.

== Life in London ==
With the rise of Hitler, business became increasingly difficult in Germany. Zoltán, as his brother did, fled to London, taking his negatives. He was given work by another Jewish refugee, Arthur Spingarn, the owner of Sackville Advertising. However, as an enemy alien at the outbreak of World War II, he was not permitted to pursue his profession as a photographer and faced the threat of internment.

After the war, Zoltán earned a living taking publicity stills for clients in the film and theatre worlds. In 1948, after twelve years as an émigré, he became a naturalised British subject.

By the mid-1950s, he was a successful fashion and advertising photographer in the capital, with a studio at 183 Kings Road, Chelsea, and another at 41 Paradise Walk, SW3.

One of Zoltán's clients was Odhams Press, which published Lilliput, a celebrated pocket-sized gentleman's magazine that featured an assortment of titillating articles and risqué humour, together with photographic essays by well-known talents, including Bill Brandt and Brassai. He photographed the British Glamour model Pamela Green for Lilliput in 1952. He also worked as a stills photographer for film director Zoltan Korda, brother of Alexander Korda.

In 1955 a collection of Zoltán's nude photographs was published in the monograph Neue Wege Der Aktfotografie von Zoltán Glass by the German publisher Karl Hofmann.

== Retirement ==
By 1964, Zoltán Glass had made enough money to sell his Chelsea studios to a consortium of British photographers. He then moved to a villa in Roquebrune on the French Riviera with his common-law wife Pat (Patricia Shirley Thompson), a former cabaret dancer. He offered his collection of pin-up photography to glamour photographer Harrison Marks who turned it down. Zoltán died in France on 24 February 1981, at the age of 77, leaving neither offspring nor a will. His photographs were eventually given to the National Science and Media Museum in Bradford, Yorkshire.
