= Charles Saunders (director) =

English film director and screenwriter (1904–1997)

- Born: Charles Joel Saunders; 8 April 1904; Paddington, London, England
- Died: 20 April 1997 (aged 93); Denham, Buckinghamshire, England
- Other name: Chas Saunders
- Occupations: Film director, screenwriter, film editor
- Relatives: Sir Peter Saunders (brother)

Charles Joel Saunders (8 April 1904 – 20 April 1997) was an English film director and screenwriter who began in the industry as a film editor, and who also contributed to television. He was the brother of the theatrical producer Sir Peter Saunders.

== Career ==
Educated at Bedales, Saunders entered the film industry in 1927 and acted as assistant director and editor with such companies as Gaumont-British. His directorial debut was a romantic comedy called No Exit (which he wrote, produced and directed), about a publisher's daughter who wrongly believes that a humble staff writer of her father's is secretly a best-selling author.

However, his main occupation from 1930 to 1943 was in the film editing sphere, learning the trade by contributing to over 20 films, and rising to become supervising editor for the 1942 Gainsborough movie Alibi, a thriller which starred James Mason and Margaret Lockwood.

In 1944, he collaborated with Bernard Miles to co-direct (and co-write) Tawny Pipit, a film starring Miles himself as an Army colonel involved with village folk in an effort to protect rare birds' nests from egg thieves.

After working as a second unit director in 1945 on The Way to the Stars, and as a location director in 1947 on The White Unicorn, he resumed his career as director with Fly Away Peter in 1948. Saunders would go on to make around ten films (including 1951's One Wild Oat, featuring a then little-known Audrey Hepburn as a hotel receptionist) before moving into television, and in 1953 and 1954 he directed eight episodes of the anthology series Douglas Fairbanks Presents, for Douglas Fairbanks Productions Limited.

He was still busy with several movie assignments, making The Golden Link, The Scarlet Web, and Meet Mr. Callaghan in 1954. He made three films in 1955, The Hornet's Nest, One Jump Ahead, and A Time to Kill. Returning to television direction once more, he then made seven episodes of the police drama series, Fabian of the Yard, broadcast on the BBC in 1955, before completing three more films in 1956 (Behind the Headlines, The Narrowing Circle, and Find the Lady).

After making three more episodes of "Fabian" in 1955 and 1956, he continued working with the BBC, filming nine instalments of another TV series, Adventures of the Big Man in 1956, which presented stories about a public relations officer in a large store.

Seven more films followed in 1957, before Saunders began to make films which marked a departure from the formulaic work he had been employed on previously. The 1958 "English sexploitation movie", Nudist Paradise, was perhaps the beginning of the end of Saunders' mainstream career in films, although he did make a horror movie the same year, called Womaneater, the story of a crazed scientist who feeds women to a flesh-eating tree in return for a life-giving serum. It was produced by Guido Coen, for whom Saunders made other movies such as the 1957 drama Kill Her Gently and the 1959 thriller Naked Fury.

After several more films, concluding with the 1963 crime thriller Danger by My Side, Saunders retired from film-making.

He died in 1997 in Denham, Buckinghamshire.

== Selected filmography ==
- No Exit (1930)
- Enter the Queen (1930, editor)
- Bill's Legacy (1931, editor)
- Immediate Possession (1931, editor)
- Peace and Quiet (1931, editor)
- We dine at Seven (1931, editor)
- Detective Lloyd (1931, editor)
- The Wrong Mr. Perkins (1931, editor)
- The Guv'nor (1935, editor)
- Everything Is Thunder (1936, editor)
- O.H.M.S. (1937, editor)
- Take My Tip (1937, editor)
- Sweet Devil (1938, editor)
- The Gaunt Stranger (1938, editor)
- The Ware Case (1938, editor)
- The Four Just Men (1939, editor)
- Young Man's Fancy (1939, editor)
- Return to Yesterday (1940, editor)
- Alibi (1942, supervising editor)
- The Gentle Sex (1943, editor)
- Tawny Pipit (1944) (co-director, Bernard Miles)
- The Way to the Stars (1945, director of Second Unit)
- The White Unicorn (1947, location director)
- Fly Away Peter (1948)
- Trouble in the Air (1948)
- Your Witness (1950, assistant to director)
- Dark Interval (1950)
- Chelsea Story (1951)
- One Wild Oat (1951)
- Death of an Angel (1952)
- Blind Man's Bluff (1952)
- Come Back Peter (1952)
- Black Orchid (1953)
- Love in Pawn (1953)
- The Scarlet Web (1954)
- The Golden Link (1954)
- Meet Mr. Callaghan (1954)
- One Jump Ahead (1955)
- The Hornet's Nest (1955)
- A Time to Kill (1955)
- The Narrowing Circle (1956)
- Behind the Headlines (1956)
- Find the Lady (1956)
- Murder Reported (1957)
- There's Always a Thursday (1957)
- The Man Without a Body (1957)
- Date with Disaster (1957)
- Kill Her Gently (1957)
- The End of the Line (1957)
- Womaneater (1958)
- Nudist Paradise (1959)
- Naked Fury (1959)
- Strictly Confidential (1959)
- Operation Cupid (1960)
- The Gentle Trap (1960)
- Dangerous Afternoon (1961)
- Jungle Street (1961)
- Danger by My Side (1963)
