= The Hole in the Ground (1962 film) =

1962 British drama-documentary film by David Cobham

- Directed by: David Cobham
- Screenplay by: Simon Campbell-Jones
- Produced by: Ronald H. Riley
- Narrated by: Russell Napier
- Cinematography: Fred Gamage
- Edited by: Michael Barden
- Production companies: R.H.R. Productions, Film Producers Guild
- Release date: 1962
- Running time: 30 minutes
- Country: United Kingdom
- Language: English

The Hole in the Ground is a 1962 British drama-documentary film directed by David Cobham and narrated by Russell Napier. It was written by Simon Campbell-Jones and sponsored by the United Kingdom Warning and Monitoring Organisation (UKWMO). The film examines the role of the Royal Observer Corps during the event of a nuclear attack on the United Kingdom.

The film has been mistakenly identified as Sound an Alarm because in some versions the title frame is missing, and the name is taken from the motto of UKWMO displayed in the end credits.

== Synopsis ==
The film dramatises a fictitious nuclear attack on Britain, focussing on the operations of the Warning and Monitoring Organisation at the Metropolitan Sector Headquarters in the south east of the country.

== Cast ==
- Russell Napier as narrator
- Tom Bowman
- Martin Boddey
- Michael Collins
- Arnold Diamond

== Home media ==
The film was included on the DVD Cold War Collection – Nuclear War In Britain – Home Front Civil Defence Films 1951–1987 (Strike Force Entertainment, 2010).

== See also ==
- List of films about nuclear issues
