= Dark Interval =

1950 British film by Charles Saunders

- Directed by: Charles Saunders
- Written by: John Gilling
- Release date: November 1950
- Running time: 60 minutes
- Country: UK
- Language: English

Dark Interval is a 1950 British second feature ('B') crime film directed by Charles Saunders, starring Zena Marshall, Andrew Osborn and John Barry. It was written by John Gilling.

== Plot ==
Walter Jordan returns to his family, in which there is a history of insanity, after his honeymoon with his wife, Sonia. His sinister butler Cedric has great affection for his master, but also wields great power over him. When Walter becomes suspicious of his family doctor and friend Trevor's relationship with Sonia, he attempts to murder her. He is shot by Cedric, who then commits suicide by poisoning.

== Cast ==
- Zena Marshall as Sonia Jordan
- Andrew Osborn as Walter Jordan
- John Barry as Trevor
- John Le Mesurier as Cedric, the butler
- Mona Washbourne
- Wallas Eaton
- Charmian Innes
- Blanche Fothergill

== Reception ==
The Monthly Film Bulletin wrote: "A would-be frightening picture which, through inadequacy of script and handling, becomes instead comically melodramatic."

Picturegoer wrote: "Honours to Andrew Osborn in the leading role in this very slow tale about a hereditary maniac who believes that his wife wants to murder him. Ex-Rank starlet Zena Marshall plays the exasperated wife, but she doesn't get a chance in the face of poor dialogue and direction. John Barry, as the family doctor who falls in love with Zena Marshall, is adequate. But nothing more. Better is Charmian Innes, as the maid. She, too, though, has to struggle with a poor script. John Le Mesurier plays the sinister butler who is devoted to his master. He spends most of his time opening doors."

Picture Show wrote: "A strong drama."

In British Sound Films: The Studio Years 1928–1959 David Quinlan rated the film as "poor", writing: "Small cast struggles hard with another unintentionally comic British 'B'."

In The British 'B' Film, Chibnall and McFarlane write: "It may have been miserablist, but it still secured a coveted place on the ABC circuit."
