= Joan Le Mesurier =

English actor and biographer (1931–2021)

Joan Dorothy Le Mesurier (née Long, formerly Malin; 3 July 1931 – 9 July 2021) was an English actress and author who was the widow and biographer of the actor John Le Mesurier.

== Life ==
Joan Long was born in Oldham, Lancashire. She was brought up in Ramsgate, where her father owned a fish-and-chip shop. She was working as a dental nurse in Broadstairs when she met the actor Mark Eden, birth name Douglas Malin, whom she married in 1953. They had one son, David Malin (1957–2017), who also became an actor. She and Eden divorced in 1959.

She had worked as a barmaid and secretary before meeting Le Mesurier at The Establishment, Peter Cook's comedy club, where she was introduced to Le Mesurier by a mutual acquaintance, Johnny Heawood, in 1963. When his second wife, Hattie Jacques, was in a relationship with another man, Le Mesurier agreed to protect Jacques' career by allowing the media to believe that his affair with Joan was the reason for his divorce. She married Le Mesurier in 1966.

A few months later Le Mesurier introduced her to his close friend Tony Hancock. When Le Mesurier was away in Paris filming Where the Spies Are (1966), she began her affair with Hancock. When her husband returned, she recalled, "he quite understood. I think he did. He was very fond of Tony, you see." Their relationship lasted on and off until Hancock's suicide in 1968, but she remained married to Le Mesurier until his death, and continued to live at the family home in Ramsgate until her death on 9 July 2021 at the age of 90.

An account of her relationship with Le Mesurier was a theme of the television drama Hattie (2011) in which she was played by Jeany Spark. Her affair with Hancock was dramatised in Hancock and Joan (2008) in which she was portrayed by Maxine Peake.

== Works ==
- Lady Don't Fall Backwards. A Memoir. London: Sidgwick & Jackson, 1988. ISBN 0-283-99664-1
- Dear John. London: Sidgwick & Jackson, 2001. ISBN 0-283-06372-6
