= Russell Napier =

Australian actor (1910–1974)

- Napier in The Man in the Road (1956)
- Born: Russell Gordon Napier; 28 November 1910; Perth, Australia
- Died: 19 August 1974 (aged 63); Surbiton, England
- Occupation: Actor
- Years active: 1947–1974
- Spouse: Lois Miller (m. 1938)
- Children: 2

Russell Gordon Napier (28 November 1910 – 19 August 1974) was an Australian actor.

== Biography ==
Russell Napier was born in Perth, Western Australia. Originally a lawyer, Napier was active as an actor on the stage as early as 1936; on the screen, from 1947 to 1974, playing both comedic and dramatic roles in both cinema and television. He starred in a live BBC television production of H. G. Wells' The Time Machine in 1949; only still photographs of this production survive.

Napier also acted on stage, and in 1936 appeared in a production of T.S. Eliot's Murder in the Cathedral at The Old Vic, which later transferred to Broadway.

He was the most frequent star of the Scotland Yard series of short films originally released from 1953 to 1961 for screenings in British cinemas, playing Inspector Harmer in two films, and then DI (later Superintendent) Duggan in thirteen others. The series was aired in the United States by the American Broadcasting Company from 1957.

He was the commentator of the official 1962 TV documentary The Hole in the Ground, about the United Kingdom Warning and Monitoring Organisation and he appeared as Doctor Green in the UFO 1970 TV series episode "A Question of Priorities". He died in Kingston upon Thames, Surrey, England.

== Selected filmography ==
- The End of the River (1947) – The Padre
- Death of an Angel (1952) – Supt. Walshaw
- Blind Man's Bluff (1952) – Stevens
- Stolen Face (1952) – Det. Cutler
- Black Orchid (1953) – Inspector Markham
- The Saint's Return (1953) – Col. Stafford
- 36 Hours (1953) – Detective at Ann's Apartment (uncredited)
- Conflict of Wings (1954) – Wing Cmdr. Rogers
- The Unholy Four (1954) – Insp. Treherne
- Companions in Crime (1954)
- The Brain Machine (1955) – Inspector Durham
- Little Red Monkey (1955) – Supt. John Harrington
- The Blue Peter (1955) – Raymound Curtis
- A Time to Kill (1955) – Inspector Simmons
- The Narrowing Circle (1956) – Sir Henry Dimmock
- The Man in the Road (1956) – Scotland Yard Supt. David
- A Town Like Alice (1956) – Jack Burns (uncredited)
- Je plaide non-coupable (1956) – Inspector Hobson
- The Last Man to Hang? (1956) – Detective Sgt. Bolton
- The Shiralee (1957) – Parker
- Robbery Under Arms (1957) – Banker Green
- A Night to Remember (1958) – Capt. Stanley Lord – Californian
- Tread Softly Stranger (1958) – Potter
- The Son of Robin Hood (1958) – Squire Miles
- The Witness (1959) – Inspector Rosewarne
- Sink the Bismarck! (1960) – Air Vice-Marshal (uncredited)
- The Angry Silence (1960) – Thompson
- Hell Is a City (1960) – Superintendent
- The Mark (1961) – Second Plain Clothes Officer
- Francis of Assisi (1961) – Brother Elias
- H.M.S. Defiant (1962) – Flag Captain
- Mix Me a Person (1962) – PC Jarrold
- Man in the Middle (1964) – Col. J.H. Thompson
- It! (1967) – Boss
- The Blood Beast Terror (1968) – Landlord
- Nobody Runs Forever (1968) – Leeds
- Twisted Nerve (1968) – Professor Fuller
- The Black Windmill (1974) – Admiral Ballantyne (uncredited) (final film role)
