= Carlton-Browne of the F.O. =

1959 British film by Roy Boulting and Jeffrey Dell

- UK cinema poster
- Directed by: Roy Boulting; Jeffrey Dell
- Written by: Roy Boulting (screenplay and story); Jeffrey Dell (screenplay and story)
- Produced by: John Boulting
- Starring: Terry-Thomas; Peter Sellers; Luciana Paluzzi
- Cinematography: Max Greene
- Edited by: Anthony Harvey
- Music by: John Addison
- Production company: Charter Film Productions
- Distributed by: British Lion Films
- Release date: 10 March 1959 (London)
- Running time: 86 minutes
- Country: United Kingdom
- Language: English
- Budget: £211,633

Carlton-Browne of the F.O. (U.S. title: Man in a Cocked Hat) is a 1959 British comedy film directed by Roy Boulting and Jeffrey Dell and starring Terry-Thomas, Peter Sellers, and Luciana Paluzzi. It was written by Boulting and Dell and produced by John Boulting.

The film centres on an inept Foreign Office (F.O.) diplomat who is sent to re-establish good relations with the island of Gaillardia, an obscure former British colony that attracts the attention of both the UK and the USSR for its mineral deposits.

== Plot ==
A title sequence prologue details Britain's accidental acquisition of the island of Gaillardia (located somewhere on the 33rd parallel south) during the 18th century, the feud between the two halves of the island and Britain's granting Gaillardia self-rule in 1916. When independence was granted, the Foreign Office (F.O.) failed to notify its representative, who was still there forty years later. He writes a letter to the F.O. informing them of suspicious Russian activity.

After some research, the F.O. decide the matter falls under the responsibility of Carlton-Browne, head of the Department of Miscellaneous Territories. Brutally inept, he had only gained the position due to the distinguished career of his father. He suggests sending out two British geologists under the cover of a British Council Morris dancing troupe putting on a show for the king of Gaillardia. At the show, the king is assassinated and his young Oxford-educated son Loris flies out to accede to the throne.

On the flight, travelling incognito as 'Mr Jones', he talks to a beautiful young woman who happens to be from Gaillardia. Carlton-Browne is sent out to see to British interests under the new king, accompanied by his military attaché Colonel Bellingham of the Bays.

Loris and his prime minister Amphibulos stall the British, hoping to start a bidding war between them and the Russians for the country's mineral wealth. Amphibulos hopes to get rich, but Loris hopes to modernise his country and benefit its people. The two are then visited by Loris's uncle Grand Duke Alexis and the veiled Princess Ilyena, whom Alexis and his rebels are backing as the true claimant to the throne.

To settle the struggle between Loris and Alexis, the British persuade the United Nations to partition the island (to save costs, this is accomplished by little more than painting a white line across the island with a cricket pitch marking trolley). Soon afterwards, the British mineralogists arrive back at the F.O. to announce they have discovered rich cobalt deposits, on what is now Alexis's half of the island. Loris comes to Britain for talks, but the F.O. refuse to meet him, instead negotiating with Alexis so Britain can seize the mineral wealth. Loris discovers this and also overhears Amphibulos giving Alexis his support and planning to overthrow Loris in favour of Ilyena.

Disgusted, Loris leaves his hotel and meets Ilyena, who is attempting to avoid an unintelligent British suitor Carlton-Browne has set up for her. Loris recognises her as the young woman from the plane but only discovers her true identity when they duck into a cinema and see a newsreel of her arrival in Britain. Initially angry that she has hidden her identity from him, he soon falls in love with her and starts to discuss with her how to outwit both Amphibulos and Alexis. The F.O. receive news of a revolution in Gaillardia, withdraw their support for the partition and send Bellingham at the head of a party of parachutists to put down the revolution.

After the parachutists mistakenly attack their own HQ, Bellingham and Carlton-Browne are captured and taken to see the leaders of the revolution, Loris and Ilyena, now engaged to be married. Loris pretends that Carlton-Browne is not in Gaillardia to intervene in the revolution, but to give his congratulations on the engagement, which Carlton-Browne goes along with. Gaillardia is reunited, the Russians, British and Americans leave and Carlton-Browne is granted orders of chivalry by both Gaillardia and Britain for his services to world peace. The credits roll on a scene of a team of workmen painting out the white line.

== Cast ==
- Terry-Thomas as Cadogan De Vere Carlton-Browne
- Peter Sellers as Prime Minister Amphibulos
- Luciana Paluzzi as Princess Ilyena
- Ian Bannen as the young King Loris
- Thorley Walters as Colonel Bellingham
- Raymond Huntley as Tufton-Slade, foreign secretary
- Miles Malleson as Davidson, resident advisor
- John Le Mesurier as the Grand Duke Alexis
- Marie Lohr as Lady Carlton-Browne
- Kynaston Reeves as Sir Arthur Carlton-Browne
- Ronald Adam as Sir John Farthing
- John Van Eyssen as Hewitt
- Nicholas Parsons as Rodgers
- Irene Handl as Mrs. Carter
- Harry Locke as Gaillardian commentator
- Basil Dignam as security officer
- Sam Kydd as signaller
- Robert Bruce as Major Miller
- John Glyn-Jones as newsreel interviewer
- Marianne Stone as woman in cinema
- Kathryn Keeton as dancer
- Margaret Lacey as onlooker

== Production ==
It was made at Shepperton Studios near London and on location at Midhurst railway station in Sussex. Filming started 28 April 1958. The films sets were designed by the art director Albert Witherick.

== Critical reception ==
The Monthly Film Bulletin wrote: "For once, the familiar Boulting Brothers' formula of uninhibited contemporary satire has placed itself in an extremely invidious position. Jokes about colonial administration, U.N. efforts to quell local revolutions, and American and Russian spheres of influence, have uncomfortable topical parallels; even if the satire were a good deal sharper than it is, these subjects cannot easily be dismissed with a lavatory joke and some facile caricature. Like its predecessors, the film is not entirely successful in combining knockabout farce with more sophisticated lampooning: many of the gags are pressed too hard and there is a tendency to mistake facetiousness for pungency. ... The presence of Jeffrey Dell as co-writer and -director, after many years of minor scripting chores, raises the hope that his lively talent for comedy will find a more substantial outlet in the future."
