= The Punch and Judy Man =

1963 British film by Jeremy Summers

- Original UK quad poster by Tom Chantrell
- Directed by: Jeremy Summers
- Written by: Philip Oakes; Tony Hancock
- Produced by: Gordon Scott (as Gordon L. T. Scott)
- Starring: Tony Hancock; Sylvia Syms; Ronald Fraser; Barbara Murray
- Cinematography: Gilbert Taylor
- Edited by: Gordon Pilkington
- Music by: Don Banks; Derek Scott
- Production company: Associated British Picture Corporation
- Distributed by: Warner-Pathé Distributors (UK)
- Release date: 8 April 1963 (UK)
- Running time: 96 minutes
- Country: United Kingdom
- Language: English

The Punch and Judy Man is a 1963 black and white British comedy film directed by Jeremy Summers and starring Tony Hancock, Sylivia Syms, Ronald Fraser and Barbara Murray. It was written by Hancock from a script by Philip Oakes, and made by Elstree Studios for the Associated British Picture Corporation. It was Hancock's second and last starring role in a film, following The Rebel (1961).

== Plot ==
Wally Pinner is a Punch and Judy man working on the beach in the (fictional) seaside town of Piltdown. He works with his assistant who also makes and repairs the puppets.

Wally and the other individuals who have beach businesses, including the Sandman who makes sand sculptures and Nevil the photographer, are a friendly community of people who pride themselves on their independence. This community is, however, frowned upon by the mayor and council, who consider it a social blight.

Wally's wife, Delia, runs a seaside curios shop below their flat, and is socially ambitious for herself and also for Wally, despite his reluctance. To achieve this, she makes moves to have Wally invited to entertain at the official reception for Lady Jane Caterham, who is to switch on the town's illuminations. At the mayoress's suggestion the reception committee invites Wally to entertain, despite her husband's reluctance. Although their marriage is lacking in passion, Wally wants to please his wife and eventually agrees to do it.

The illumination ceremony ends in farce when Wally's electric shaver leads to a disruption of the power, resulting in some of the illuminated signs displaying unflattering comments about the town. Wally then puts on his show for the guests at the formal dinner and dance, but a drunken guest heckles Punch and disrupts the performance, leading to a food fight involving all the guests. Lady Jane's attempt to leave is blocked and she gets into an argument with Wally, during which she insults and slaps Delia who responds by flooring her with a punch, to the horror of the mayor and mayoress.

The next morning Delia has a black eye: her dreams of social acceptance have vanished, but Wally and Delia are now closer, and happily decide to leave Piltdown for pastures new.

== Cast ==
- Tony Hancock as Wally Pinner
- Sylvia Syms as Delia Pinner, Wally's wife
- Ronald Fraser as Mayor
- Barbara Murray as Lady Caterham
- John Le Mesurier as Charles Arthur Ford, The Sandman
- Hugh Lloyd as Edward Cox, Wally's assistant
- Norman Bird as council committee man
- Kevin Brennan as landlord
- Eddie Byrne as ice cream assistant
- Mario Fabrizi as Nevil Shanks
- Nicholas Webb as Peter
- Brian Bedford as Lady Caterham's 1st escort
- Peter Myers as Lady Caterham's 2nd escort
- Peter Vaughan as council committee man
- Norman Chappell as footman
- Gerald Harper as first drunk
- Walter Hudd as clergyman
- Hattie Jacques as Dolly Zarathusa, the fortune teller
- Michael Ripper as Waiter
- Russell Waters as Bobby Bachelor the band leader
- Carole Ann Ford as girl in seaside kiosk

== Background ==
The film is a gentle but bitter-sweet comedy. In an early scene, Wally and Delia have breakfast in almost total silence, and the scene demonstrates that they are married from habit, and no longer have anything in common.

In the following scene, Wally angrily rams a bunch of flowers up a porcelain pig's backside, which is later discovered by Delia in a socially awkward situation. The flowers were first intended to go up the pig's nose, but Hancock argued that the joke had to be stronger and so a prop with a suitable orifice was made. The scene with Wally was cut from the 2006 DVD (in 4:3 aspect ratio) in "Tony Hancock Collection" released by Optimum Releasing, and from many television versions, leaving only the moment when Delia finds the flowers; the following scene, when Wally goes to join his assistant Edward in his workshop, is also cut, so this cut version runs for only 88 minutes. An uncut (97 minutes) version (in its original theatrical aspect ratio of 1:1.66) was released on DVD and Blu-ray by Network in 2019, and was shown on Talking Pictures TV in 2021.

In another scene, Wally retreats from the rain into an ice cream parlour with a small boy, played by Sylvia Syms' nephew, Nicholas Webb. The boy asks for a large sundae (a "Piltdown Glory") and Wally orders the same. Then, because he is uncertain of the correct technique for eating the dessert, Wally carefully watches the boy and imitates his every move. The scene was completed from several different takes, between which Hancock sipped vodka to wash away the taste of the ice cream which he strongly disliked. The scene was originally intended to be done in a shorter time frame, but Hancock believed that drawing it out longer would work better and hold more impact and humour for viewers.

Several actors from Hancock's earlier television series Hancock's Half Hour also appear in supporting roles: John Le Mesurier, Hugh Lloyd, Mario Fabrizi and (briefly) Hattie Jacques. Syms was cast as Delia after Billie Whitelaw withdrew. Roger Wilmut, in Tony Hancock: Artiste (1978), argues that the climactic food fight escalates too quickly and that a more experienced director would have given it more time to develop comedically.

The film itself was partly shot on location in Bognor Regis, and when the producers asked for some local people to take parts as extras, over 2,000 people turned up. Many parts of the town are shown in the film; the pier and the town hall feature alongside other areas such as Spencer Street, Belmont Street, and York Road, beside the Esplanade and Royal Hotel, where the film crew stayed. Tony Hancock himself stayed at the more expensive and smarter Royal Norfolk Hotel during filming.

== Reception ==
The Monthly Film Bulletin wrote: "The question of Tony Hancock's image' as a comedian has lately been much to the fore. The old Hancock of East Cheam got along without one; the new Hancock (or the post-Galton and Simpson Hancock) is clearly much concerned with the question, and this film, along with his recent TV series, must be regarded as part of the process of self-discovery. Hancock's own uncertainty about just what he wants to do with his truculent, abrasive, likeable screen other self seems to hang over The Punch and Judy Man; and the young director, Jeremy Summers, has been unable to provide the firmness lacking in the script. But, botched though the film often is, its faults (and its virtues) are never wearily conventional. The whole tone of the comedy is quiet, understressed, a little melancholy, from the rainswept setting of the beach itself .... In the first few minutes – Hancock dressing, to the chilling accompaniment of the Bbc, and eating a glum breakfast at which the stirring of tea and the crunching of toast reverberate like storm signals – the film establishes its mood. Nothing that follows is quite as good, and set-pieces ... suffer most from indecision in the direction, a failure to sustain and build comic tempo. At some time, in someone's mind, The Punch and Judy Man existed as a distinctive and very engaging comedy. It hasn't come through on the screen quite like this, but one warms all the same to its performances ... and to its little, lugubrious jokes."

Filmink magazine dubbed it "The Film Hancock Did after Sacking His Writers Which No One Really Likes".
