= Traitor (Play for Today) =

- Play for Today episode
- Episode no.: Series 2 Episode 1
- Directed by: Alan Bridges
- Written by: Dennis Potter
- Original air date: 14 October 1971

Episode chronology
← Previous "Everybody Say Cheese"	Next → "Edna, the Inebriate Woman"

"Traitor" is the first episode of the second season of the British BBC anthology TV series Play for Today. The episode was a television play that was originally broadcast on 14 October 1971. "Traitor" was written by Dennis Potter, directed by Alan Bridges, produced by Graeme MacDonald, and starred John Le Mesurier as Adrian Harris, a character loosely based on Kim Philby. Le Mesurier's performance won him the British Academy Television Award for Best Actor in 1972.

== Plot ==
Western journalists visit Moscow to interview Adrian Harris, a former controller in British intelligence who was also a double agent for the Soviet Union. Harris believes in both Communism and Englishness, believing himself to have betrayed his class, but not his country. The press find these beliefs incompatible, and want to find out why he became a ‘traitor’. Harris is plagued by anxieties over both his actions and his upper-class childhood, and drinks to a state of collapse.

== Cast ==
- Adrian Harris – John Le Mesurier
- James – Jack Hedley
- Simpson – Vincent Ball
- Blake – Neil McCallum
- Thomas – Jon Laurimore
- Sir Arthur Harris – Lyndon Brook
- Lady Emma – Diana Fairfax
- Michaelov – Richard Marner
- Duty clerk – Terence Bayler
- Craig – John Quentin
- Schoolmaster – John Saunders
- Young Adrian – Sean Maddox

== Reception ==
Better known for comedic roles, Le Mesurier's casting was a brave move, one which initially concerned the actor who "was very, very scared" that "he wouldn’t be able to pull it off". Le Mesurier would later call the role 'the best part I ever had on TV'. While reviews of the play were mixed, critics were unanimous in their praise for Le Mesurier and he won the British Academy Television Award for Best Actor in 1972.
