= Blind Man's Bluff (1952 film) =

British crime film by Charles Saunders

- Lobby card
- Directed by: Charles Saunders
- Written by: John Gilling
- Produced by: Charles Reynolds
- Starring: Zena Marshall; Sydney Tafler; Anthony Pendrell; Russell Napier
- Cinematography: Ted Lloyd
- Edited by: Margery Saunders
- Music by: Arthur Wilkinson
- Production company: Charles Reynolds Productions
- Distributed by: Apex Film Distributors
- Release date: January 1952
- Running time: 67 minutes
- Country: United Kingdom
- Language: English

Blind Man's Bluff is a 1952 British 'B' crime film directed by Charles Saunders and starring Zena Marshall, Sydney Tafler, and Anthony Pendrell. It was written by John Gilling.

== Plot ==
Author Roger Morley, son of a police inspector, is looking for inspiration for his next novel, and solves a gang mystery that had baffled Scotland Yard.

== Cast ==
- Zena Marshall as Christine Stevens
- Sydney Tafler as Rikki Martin
- Anthony Pendrell as Roger Morley
- Russell Napier as Stevens
- Norman Shelley as Inspector Morley
- John Le Mesurier as Lefty Jones
- Tony Doonan as Charley
- Barbara Shaw as Clare Raven
- Joan Hickson as Mrs. Kipps
- Michael Ward as jewellers' assistant

== Critical reception ==
Picturegoer wrote: "Most low-budget thrillers rigidly conform to pattern, and this modest British effort is no exception to the rule.... All the salient situations are telegraphed, and thrills are few and far between."

Picture Show described the film as a "neat thriller."

Chibnall and McFarlane in The British 'B' Film called the film "an uneasy combination of stock characters and complicated plotting."
