= Goodness, How Sad =

1937 play by Robert Morley

Goodness, How Sad is a play written by the British actor Robert Morley, which was first performed in 1937. The work was strongly influenced by Morley's affection for provincial theatre.

== Synopsis ==
A British-born Hollywood idol returns to a small seaside town where he had once worked as a struggling actor. The visit awakens nostalgic feelings, and he is cast in a play at the local theatre where nobody recognises him as a famous star. After falling in love with his leading lady, he slowly begins to realise that his attempts to recreate the past are doomed to failure.

== Film adaptation ==
In 1939 the play was adapted into a film directed by Robert Stevenson at Ealing Studios. Renamed as Return to Yesterday the film starred Clive Brook as the Hollywood star and Anna Lee as the aspiring young actress he falls in love with. The film had a slightly troubled production, and wasn't released until March 1940.

== Bibliography ==
- Richards, Jeffrey. The Unknown 1930s: An Alternative History of the British Cinema, 1929-1939. I.B. Tauris, 2000.
