= Sheffield Repertory Theatre =

The Sheffield Repertory Theatre was a theatre company in Sheffield, South Yorkshire, England which from 1928 was based in the Sheffield Playhouse.

Herbert M. Prince, a railway clerk, founded the amateur dramatics society in 1919, a first meeting is recorded at the Oxford Street Settlement in Shipton Street that year, which became the Sheffield Repertory Theatre in 1923. A meeting in October 1923 formed an Executive Committee for a professional Company, consisting of Wilfred Vickers, W.C. Landon, C.V. McNally, A. Ballard, H.W. d. Harkcom and Herbert M. Prentice. The subscription was 3 shillings and sixpence.

At the first Annual Meeting in January 1924, the aims were formulated:

1. To promote and encourage interest in the Drama and kindred Arts.
2. To produce Plays
3. To arrange lectures, recitals, play-readings and discussions
4. To promote social intercourse amongst the members
5. To form a library of dramatic literature for the use of members
6. The establishment of a permanent Repertory Theatre in Sheffield

Their first performances took place at the Little Theatre in Shipton Street. Later the Company hired the South Street Schoolroom in Eldon Street. In 1928 the Company gained a permanent venue and moved to the former Temperance Hall, in Townhead Street, which became known as the Sheffield Playhouse. The seating of this new Repertory Theatre was 319 in the saloon (Stalls) and 222 in the Balcony.

In 1932, Prentice left to join Birmingham Repertory Theatre.

With the outbreak of war in 1939, the theatre was closed, along with nearly all British theatres, by a government fearful of German bombing and consequent mass loss of life in such public buildings. This closure led to a most bizarre period. In order to resolve the financial crisis the Company arranged to reform in Southport, a de-restricted area, and carry on the business there. Despite the government allowing the theatre in Sheffield to re-open by 1940, a binding contract had already been signed in Southport. It thus proved impractical to operate in both towns and the decision was taken that the Company should remain in Southport. Over 240 productions took place in the Lancashire resort by a Yorkshire repertory during the war. The building in Townhead Street was eventually hired out for storage.

At the end of the war, the Company was able to return to its natural home, although it owed a debt to Southport for its survival. The theatre was in a dishevelled condition, following its utilitarian usage during the war, but the Company, helped by willing volunteers successfully renovated the auditorium in 1945, allowing it to re-open to the theatre-going public, with the appropriately titled play, The Peaceful Inn.

By 1951, the theatre was a cultural and financial success. Most patrons bought season tickets, and so would attend every new performance. Sheffield was one of the few regional theatres to adopt a fortnightly cycle of plays. This was generally accepted to provide a much higher quality of performance; most repertory changed weekly. Plays running the gamut from Shakespeare to interpretations of the latest 'West End Smash' would alternate throughout the year. The festive season saw not a 'Panto' but a play designed to appeal to children, that would nonetheless cultivate their minds.

By 1953, the theatre was struggling to cope with its success. The building failed to meet increasing health and safety demands. The management took the decision to completely rebuild it. Stripped back to its bare walls, the interior was entirely renewed as a sleek 'Fifties' auditorium replaced the stippled decor of the out-dated theatre. The Company had become so successful in the ensuing eight years since the war, that £20,000 could be invested in the internal rebuild of the premises.

In March 1954, the theatre re-opened and its success continued unabated, under the leadership of Geoffrey Ost, who had been the director since 1938, a service broken only by his wartime call-up. In 1959, Ost was awarded an honorary Doctorate at the University (a Scholarship still exists under his name). The future acting stars who were members of the Company include Peter Sallis, Patrick McGoohan, Patrick Stewart, Paul Eddington, Keith Barron and Nigel Hawthorne. Actors such as Sir Alec Guinness and Patrick Macnee also performed in individually contracted productions and Sir Donald Wolfit was an assistant stage manager there. However Sheffield Rep. was really all about the local community - it only survived and prospered because of voluntary or semi-professional basis, although it did have paid employees as well.

The company was identified as a significant repertory company in the UK by the Arts Council during the 1960s, and a trust was formed to oversee the construction of a new building. The new Crucible Theatre replaced the old theatre in 1971 financed by the Arts Council, Sheffield City Council and public donations. Geoffrey Ost was still there, noted as 'General Advisor'.
