= Philip Oakes =

British journalist, poet and novelist (1928–2005)

Philip Barlow Oakes (31 January 1928 – 18 December 2005) was a British journalist, poet and novelist.

== Biography ==
Oakes was born in Burslem, his father was a travelling salesman and his mother was a teacher. At the age of four Oakes' father died and at the age of eight his mother developed a brain tumour. She was unable to look after him and so placed him into the care of the Royal Orphanage in Wolverhampton. Oakes was later expelled from there and finished his education at a grammar school in rural Lancashire.

Oakes was conscripted towards the end of the Second World War and eventually found himself working on a troop newspaper. He continued his journalistic career on demobilization. As a journalist he worked for Truth and was a film critic for The Sunday Telegraph from 1964. As a screenwriter he worked with Tony Hancock on the script for The Punch and Judy Man (1962). Oakes also made regular appearances on the radio programme Stop the Week.

His published works included at least four novels: The God Botherers (André Deutsch 1969, retitled Miracles: genuine cases contact Box 340; a novel John Day 1971 [US]); Experiment at Proto (Coward, McCann & Geoghegan 1973 [US], André Deutsch 1973 [UK], retitled The Proto Papers Quartet 1974), which describes a scientific project to develop human-primate communications; Cast of Thousands (Victor Gollancz 1976) portraying a libidinous film critic; and the humorous Shopping for Women (André Deutsch 1994) about fetching a female Giant panda from North Korea. Volumes of poetry included In the Affirmative (André Deutsch 1968), Married/Singular (André Deutsch 1973), and Selected Poems (André Deutsch 1982).

Oakes retired to Market Rasen, Lincolnshire in later life. He died there of a heart attack at the age of 77.
