= French Without Tears =

1936 play by Terence Rattigan

- Kay Hammond & Roland Culver in the original Criterion Theatre production, 1936
- Written by: Terence Rattigan
- Original language: English
- Genre: Comedy

Premiere
- Date premiered: 1936

French Without Tears is a comic play written by a 25-year-old Terence Rattigan in 1936.

== Setting ==
It takes place in a cram school for adults needing to acquire French for business reasons. Scattered throughout are Franglais phrases and schoolboy misunderstandings of the French language.

The play was inspired by a 1933 visit to a village called Marxzell in the Black Forest, where young English gentlemen went to cram German.

== Reception ==
The play was a success on its London debut, establishing Rattigan as a dramatist. A critic thought it "gay, witty, thoroughly contemporary ... with a touch of lovable truth behind all its satire."

It ran for over 1,000 performances in London, and over 100 in New York. It also established Rex Harrison as a major star.

== Original production ==
The play, directed by Harold French, opened on 6 November 1936 at the Criterion Theatre, London, with the following cast:

- Alan Howard - Rex Harrison
- Brian Curtis - Guy Middleton
- Commander Bill Rogers - Roland Culver
- Diana Lake - Kay Hammond
- Jacqueline Maingot - Jessica Tandy
- Kenneth Lake - Trevor Howard
- Kit Neilan - Robert Flemyng
- Lord Heybrook - William Dear
- Marianne/t/o Jacqueline Maingot - Yvonne Andre
- Monsieur Maingot - Percy Walsh

== Adaptations ==
A film version, directed by Anthony Asquith and starring Ray Milland, was released in 1940. In 1960 Rattigan himself refashioned the work as the musical Joie de Vivre but it was not a success.

The play was revived in Paris in the summer of 1945 starring the British actress, Anna Neagle.

A television production was featured in the Saturday Playhouse TV series on 7 June 1958, with Denholm Elliott, Elvi Hale, Colin Broadley, Nicholas Parsons, and Andrew Irvine and another in the BBC's Play of the Month series on 16 May 1976, starring Nigel Havers, Anthony Andrews and David Robb.

A radio version directed by Gerry Jones was broadcast on BBC Radio 4 on 25 December 1986, repeated on 14 May 1989 and 20 July 1992.
