= The Stowaway (1958 film) =

- Directed by: Australian credits: Lee Robinson; French credits: Ralph Habib
- Written by: Australian credits: Lee Robinson; Joy Cavill; French credits: Maurice Aberge; Paul Andreota; Ralph Habib
- Based on: Le Passager Clandestin ("The Stowaway"); 1947 novel by Georges Simenon
- Produced by: Australian credits: Lee Robinson associate Joy Cavill; French credits: Paul-Edmond Decharme
- Starring: Martine Carol; Roger Livesey; Arletty
- Cinematography: Desmond Dickinson
- Edited by: Australian credits: Stanley Moore; French credits: Monique Kirsanoff
- Music by: Michel Emer
- Production companies: Southern International Productions(Australia); Discifilm/Silverfilm (France)
- Distributed by: Associated British (UK)
- Release dates: 22 March 1958 (France); May 1960 (Australia)
- Running time: 145 mins (original release); 93 minutes
- Countries: Australia; France
- Languages: English; French
- Budget: £250,000
- Box office: 1,776,374 admissions (France)

The Stowaway is a 1958 Australian-French adventure film directed by Australian director Lee Robinson and French Lebanese director Ralph Habib. It was shot on location in Tahiti and is one of the few Australian financed movies of the 1950s, although the storyline has nothing to do with Australia.

There are French and English versions of the film. These versions have different credits, mostly in terms of behind the scenes personnel. The French version is known as Le Passager clandestin.

It was the second of three collaborations between Lee Robinson and French producers, the others being Walk into Paradise and the Restless and the Damned.

== Synopsis ==
In Panama, some men arrive on a passenger ship, Major Owens and Mr Buddington. Bugginton is looking for a missing heir Rene Marechal, thought to be near Tahiti. He tracks her to Marechal's former mistress, Colette, who lives with another former Parisian, Gabrielle. There is a reward to find Marechal, so Colette decides to find him as well. Major Owens is also after the missing heir.

Colette decides to use the fact that ship officer, Jean, is infatuated with her to stowaway on Jean's ship to Tahiti. Also on board that boat is Buddington, Major Owens, and a mystery man, Mougins.

On the trip, Major Owens gambles with Buddington and gets the latter considerably in debt. Owens ask Buddington to stop looking for Marechal so that Owens can collect the reward. This is overheard by Mougins who breaks into Buddington's room and kills him in a fight.

Mougins realises Colette was a stowaway. Owens looks for Marechal, as does Mougins. Jean takes Colette to his place on Tahiti. Owens suggests he and Colette team up to find Marechal but she is reluctant as by this stage she has genuinely fallen in love with Jean. Colette tries to get rid of Mougins by telling him that Owens has hired a boat off a man called Wong Fu.

Jean gets fifteen days off so he can marry Colette. She tells him she doesn't love him any more. Mougins tells Colette his plan to pretend to be Marechal, with Colette providing verification. Owens discovers his boat has been hired to Mougins.

Mougins murders Owens and goes on the boat with Colette. Jean is told about this and gets on board. Jean is discovered by Mougins and is tied up but Colette discovers him and frees him.

Jean and Mougins fight, with the crew rallying to assist Jean. Mougins falls overboard and is eaten by a shark. Jean and Colette kiss.

== Cast ==
- Martine Carol as Colette
- Roger Livesey as Major Owens
- Carl Heinz Boehm as Jean
- Serge Reggiani as Mougins
- Arletty as Gabrielle
- Reg Lye as Buddington
- Maea Flohr
- James Condon as ship purser
- Doris Fitton as gossipy tourist
- John Martin as captain
- Yvon Chabana as Max
- Frederic Gray
- Charley Mauu as Taro
- Vahinerii Tauhiro as Vahinerii
- Teheiura Poheroa
- Germaine Levers

== Original novel ==
George Simenon's novel was published as Le Passager Clandestin in 1947. An English language version was published in 1957 as The Stowaway.

Filmink argued the novel "feels as though it would have made a lively 1940s Warner Bros movie shot on the studio backlot with Sydney Greenstreet and Peter Lorre" but "wasn’t a bad choice for an international co-production – the basic story was relatively simple (searching for a missing person), it provided opportunities for location filming (Pacific, Tahiti, beaches), and being a “dodgy people in the South Seas” tale meant audiences would expect anyone to turn up, thus made it easier for them to accept an international cast."

== Development ==
Ad in Sydney Sun Herald 26 June 1955

In May 1955 it was announced producer Paul-Edmond Decharme, best known for Manon (1949) and Blueberd (1951), would make two films a year in the Pacific. The first two would be co-productions with Chips Rafferty and Lee Robinson, starting with Walk into Paradise, which would be shot on location in New Guinea, in English and French versions. The second film would be made in Tahiti with French director Yves Allegret as the principal director and Robinson as director of the English version. This movie would be shot in Cinema-Scope and would hopefully star Gerard Philippe.

"I was told that the Pacific was very wide, and its capital was Sydney so I came here," said Decharne. "I also heard that Australians appreciated French films better than any other country outside Europe. La Ronde made more money in Australia than it did in France."

Robinson later said he was attracted to work with French companies because "they were so organised, and they were so strong financially."

At one stage the film was called Vahini Tahiti.

In March 1957 Chips Rafferty announced the lead roles would be played by Françoise Arnoul, best known for Fire in the Blood and French Cancan, and John Forrest, who had just been in Dust in the Sun. Neither actor appeared in the final movie.

By July 1957 the stars were announced as Martine Carol and Trevor Howard with five Australians, four men and a woman, to appear in the support cast. Carol was a French film star who was attempting to move into international movies at the time, just having made Action of the Tiger with Van Johnson. Howard ultimately did not appear in the final film.

Lee Rafferty and Chips Robinson contributed money towards the production via sales from Walk into Paradise and funds loaned from Herc McIntyre out of the superannuation fund of Universal Picture's Australian branch.

Robinson says the French producer arranged the main cast, but he was responsible for casting Roger Livesey. "Livesey was on tour in Australia [in a stage play], so we engaged Livesy as one of our actors here." Robinson says "There was no role for Chips" in the film. Filmink argued this was a mistake and that Rafferty could have played either of the roles played by Reg Lye or Roger Livesey.

Martine Carol stopped off at Brisbane airport on 5 September flying from Paris to Tahiti. She was met by over 300 fans and Chips Rafferty. The Australian film unit had left for Tahiti earlier that week.

== Production ==
The film was shot towards the end of 1957 in Tahiti and the Society Islands. Scenes were shot on a studio on the island, as well as on the ship 'Caledonin'.

Robinson says half the crew was Australian and the other half was French. Filming was completed by November. Martine Carol spent four months on Tahiti and was back in Paris by January 1958.

Dialogue scenes were filmed twice, in English (by Robinson) and French (by Habib). Robinson claimed he didn't like Habib's style of direction.

He was a mad home movies crank and would stand by the camera or even ten feet away from it and be shooting the scene that was his first take. I used to wonder how the hell does he know what is going on there. Often he was on an entirely different angle to the camera. He often seemed more concerned about getting a good scene on his little 16 mm camera. Right from the beginning I found I was in a marvellous position as the second follow-up director because I could see everything that was being done and then rack my brains for some little thing that might spice the scene up a bit.

Noted Sydney theatre actor Doris Fitton had a supporting role. She filmed on Tahiti for three weeks being back in Sydney by late October 1957.

While making the film in Tahiti, Robinson and his crew then shot an Italian-French co production called Hula Hula. Later they came back to make a pilot for a CBS show Machete and then The Restless and the Damned.

== Release ==
On 23 August 1958 Lee Robinson announced Dust in the Sun and The Stowaway were going to be released by Universal in Australia. Robinson said, "I consider this deal is a relevant comment on recent statements that the Australian film industry is failing for lack of support."

The film was released in France - Robinson said it had a "five major cinema release in Paris" - but only received a limited release in Australia: it had its debut in Dubbo in 1958 and in Sydney and Melbourne in 1960. It was not as successful as Walk into Paradise. Robinson blames this on the impact of television and says the losses he made on the film and Restless and the Damnded contributed to Southern International going broke.

=== Critical reception ===
Variety reviewed the film in Paris in September 1958. It reported:

This garishly colored pic was shot in Tahiti. That is its main trump with the easygoing island habits and its scenery. Otherwise, this fairly hackneyed adventure yarn lacks the pace, mounting and acting to make color prints worth while for Yank chances... Ralph Habib’s cliche-ridden direction does not help instill life into this. Miss Carol walks through this listlessly and shows some rounded anatomy at times. Serge Reggiani and Roger Livesey are fine as the fortune hunters.

Kinematograph Weekly reviewed the film in October 1959. It declared:

The picture impresses scenically... but the rough stuff lacks subtlety, and its love interest 1s anaemic. Roger Livesey gets by as Owens, and Serge Reggiani pulls out all the stops... but Martine Carol is not particularly attractive as the frightened peroxide “ beauty" Colette, James Condon has little idea of acting as John, and the rest haven't a clue either. The climax is showmanlike, but even so the overall makes its appeal mainly to the tourist trade.

The Sydney Morning Herald, reviewing the film in May 1960, said "Robinson has little dramatic idea of how to handle his people (particularly Reggiani) or his plot. His flat treatment slows the treasure chase to a crawl. Clumsy cutting, and stilted voice-dubbing for the Continental players, are technical faults astonishing in so elaborate a production. The natural beauties of Tahiti... are some consolation."

Colin Bennett of The Age called it "a snail-paced adaptation" and complained about "the weird collection of actors" and "sad appearance of an ageing Arletty" although commented the color shots of Tahiti, its lagoons, girls and dances may warm your winter's day. Unfortunately nothing else about the picture will."

Filmink claimed the main problem of the film was the absence of Raffety, the poor script, and the fact too many scenes were set indoors rather than taking advantage of Tahiti's scenry. However it felt "the acting is accomplished, Martine Carol is a lot of fun (she looks like a Gold Coast cougar, with her deep tan and peroxide hair), Boehm was solid, Livesey and Lye are entertaining, it’s fun to see Arletty pop up, ditto Australian actors like Reg Lye, Doris Fitton (a gossipy tourist) and James Condon (ship’s purser), and the Tahitian setting is interesting. That doesn’t mean the film worked... although it could have."
