= John Chandos (disambiguation) =

John Chandos may refer to:

- John Chandos (died 1369), English knight
- John Chandos (MP) (died 1428), MP for Herefordshire (UK Parliament constituency)
- John Chandos (actor) (1917 – 1987), Scottish actor
- John Brydges, 1st Baron Chandos (1492 – 1557), English courtier
