= Reg Lye =

Australian actor (1912–1987)

- Born: Reginald Thomas Lye; 13 October 1912; Sydney, New South Wales, Australia
- Died: 23 March 1987 (aged 74); Windsor, New South Wales, Australia
- Occupation: Actor
- Spouse(s): Phyllis Alma (Bessey) Lye (m. 11 February 1935 – div. 1 October 1947); Ruth Margaret Clyne (m. 1948)
- Children: 3

Reginald Thomas Lye (13 October 1912 – 23 March 1987), was an Australian actor who worked extensively in Australia and England.

== Career ==
Lye was one of the busiest Australian actors of the 1950s, appearing in the majority of locally shot features at the time, as well as on stage and radio. Lee Robinson called him "one of the best character actors in Australia."

During World War 2 he served as a Driver, Motor Transport with the RAAF reaching the rank of Leading Air Craftsman (LAC). He was attached to 452 Squadron RAAF (part of No1 Fighter Wing RAAF) based at Strauss Airfield (just outside Darwin) in Northern Territory.

After running his own revue company in the Riverina, Lye joined Sydney's New Theatre. His stage credits there included How Beautiful With Shoes (1946), God Bless the Guv'nor (1946), Enemies (1946), Of Mice and Men (1946), Sons of the South (1947), Woman Bites Dog, Deep Are the Roots (1947), A Physician in Spite of Himself (1947), Rocket Range (1947) and Sky without Birds (1952). He directed Stove, Sink and View in 1948. Lye directed Rocket Range for the Forbes Society, which won Best Play in a local competition. At the Orange Drama Festival, he won the award for Best Actor as Henry Gow in Noël Coward's short play Fumed Oak. He then played Mr Markham in the radio play Mr Markham, Antique Dealer which he also co-adapted for the stage.

He starred alongside Chips Rafferty in several films, including western Eureka Stockade (1949) and King of the Coral Sea (1953). In 1956 he appeared in the British-American comedy film Smiley and Cecil Holmes's Australian anthology film Three in One. and Walk Into Paradise – the latter with Chips Rafferty once more. He then featured in Dust in the Sun (1958), and French-Australian films Stowaway (1958) and The Restless and the Damned (1959).

Lye relocated to England in the early 1960s, with a stage production of The One Day of the Year but after afterwards, found himself unemployed for three months due to an actors' strike. He took jobs repairing houses, but after a year, he finally found a decent agent. In 1965 he secured a minor role in the Hollywood war film King Rat, Following this, he appeared in numerous television series and films, including police procedural series Z-Cars, medical drama Dr. Finlay's Casebook, BBC series For Whom the Bell Tolls, comedy drama series Mrs Thursday and The Wednesday Play. During this time, he shared an Earl's Court flat with New Theatre alumni Jerry Wells.

Lye returned to Australia when the film industry revived in the 1970s. He starred in the 1975 Australian New Wave drama film Sunday Too Far Away, opposite Jack Thompson, for which he won an Australian Film Institute award for Best Supporting Actor for his role. In 1981, he was in political thriller The Killing of Angel Street, based on the true story of the 1975 disappearance of Juanita Nielsen during her involvement in the protest of a King's Cross development project. He then appeared in 1982 road movie Freedom alongside Max Cullen, Chris Haywood, Charles Tingwell, with the ill-fated Jon Blake in the lead role. The following year, he featured in family film Molly, alongside a young Claudia Karvan.

== Personal life and death ==
Lye's first wife was Phyllis Alma (Bessey) Lye, whom he married in Canterbury, New South Wales on 11 February 1935. They were divorced on 1 October 1947. In 1948, Lye married his second wife, Ruth Margaret Clyne in Glebe, Sydney. By 1951 they were living at Jemalong Weir near Forbes, in Central West NSW. He had a daughter and two sons. Lye died on 23 March 1987, age 74 in Hawkesbury District Hospital, Windsor, New South Wales.

== Filmography ==
=== Film ===
Year	Title	Role	Notes
1949	Eureka Stockade	Digger	
1954	King of the Coral Sea	Grundy	
1955	Three in One	The Swaggie	Anthology film, segment "Joe Wilson's Mates"
1956	Walk Into Paradise	Ned 'Shark-eye' Kelley	
1956	Smiley	Pa Bill Greevins	
1956	Captain Steve's Odyssey		
1957	The Shiralee	Desmond	
1958	The Stowaway	Buddington	
1958	Smiley Gets a Gun	Pa Bill Greevins	
1958	Dust in the Sun	Dirks	
1959	L'ambitieuse (aka The Ambitious or The Restless and the Damned)	Matthews	
1962	The Amorous Prawn (aka The Playgirl and the War Minister)	Uncle Joe, the poacher	
1963	The Wrong Arm of the Law	Reg Denton	
1964	The Counterfeit Constable (aka Allez France! or Go France!)	Le chauffeur de taxi fatigué	
1964	Stell		
1965	King Rat	Tinker Bell	
1966	The Wrong Box	Third Undertaker	
1967	Fathom	Mr. Trivers	
1967	Danger Route	Balin	
1967	A Challenge for Robin Hood	Much	
1968	The Lost Continent	Helmsman	
1969	Battle of Britain	Workman (uncredited)	
1968	The Magnificent Six and ½: It's Not Cricket	Angry Houseowner	Short film
1970	The Games	Gilmour	
1970	Performance	Workman (uncredited)	
1971	10 Rillington Place (aka The Strangler of Rillington Place)	Tramp	
1972	Burke & Hare	Old Joe	
1972	The Amazing Mr. Blunden	Sexton	
1972	Ooh… You Are Awful	Bogus Milkman (uncredited)	
1975	Sunday Too Far Away	Old Garth	
1977	Jabberwocky	Hawker (uncredited)	
1977	Wombling Free	Assistant Surveyor	
1977	Blind Man's Bluff	Uncle Fred	
1978	Death on the Nile	Workman (uncredited)	
1979	Tarka the Otter	Dairy Farmer	
1979	Unidentified Flying Oddball (aka The Spaceman and King Arthur)	Prisoner	
1979	A Man Called Intrepid	Newsvendor	
1981	The Killing of Angel Street	Riley	
1982	Freedom	Old farmer	
1983	Molly	Old Dan	

=== Television ===
Year	Title	Role	Notes
1957	Shadow of Doubt	Hughie	TV play
1958	The Flaming Sword	Poggy	TV movie
1959	The Grey Nurse Said Nothing		TV play
1960	The Dock Brief	Fowle	TV play
1960	Turning Point	Lucy	TV play
1960	Stormy Petrel	George Suttor	Miniseries, 1 episode
1961	The Sergeant from Burralee	Joshua Beer	TV play
1961	Whiplash	Barrow / Bradley Bradley / Police Sergeant	3 episodes
1962	Reunion Day	Carmody	TV play
1962	The Slaughter of St Teresa's Day	Barney	TV play
1962	The Runner		TV play
1962	Ghost Squad	Night Watchman	1 episode
1962	The One Day of the Year	Wacka Dawson	TV play
1962–1964	ITV Play of the Week	Leslie / Donny Pratt / Mr Thompson	Anthology series, 4 episodes
1962–1971	Armchair Theatre	Charlie Gutteridge / Mr Williamson / Dad	Anthology series, 3 episodes
1963	BBC Sunday-Night Play	Walter Tompkins	Anthology series, 1 episode
1963	Jezebel ex UK	George Tucker	1 episode
1963	Moonstrike	Avary	Anthology series, 1 episode
1963–1964	Emergency Ward 10	Mr Anstruther	9 episodes
1963–1966	No Hiding Place	Fred Conner / Jake / Tug Wilson / Mortimer Bilk	4 episodes
1964	Crane	Stanley	1 episode
1964	The Protectors	Pop Masters	1 episode
1964	Catch Hand	Smoky	1 episode
1964	Theatre 625	Foka	Anthology series, 1 episode
1964–1965	The Saint	Captain Bill Williams / George / Pop Kinsall	3 episodes
1964–1969	Dixon of Dock Green	Jigger Lees / Boatman	7 episodes
1965	Hit and Run	Jelly Evans	4 episodes
1965	Gideon's Way	Doctor Hill	1 episode
1965	Contract to Kill	Paul Cormier	Miniseries, 1 episode
1965	Jury Room	John Brightman	1 episode
1965	Heiress of Garth	Spatcher	Miniseries, 1 episode
1965	The Troubleshooters	Mr Spratt	1 episode
1965	A World of Comedy	Sanop 409	Miniseries, 1 episode
1965	For Whom the Bell Tolls	Primitivo	3 episodes
1965	The Mask of Janus	Tchernik	1 episode
1965; 1968	Dr. Finlay's Casebook	Hughie Logan / Rab Wilkie	2 episodes
1965–1975	Z-Cars	Norman Bright / Limpy Jack / Bernie Planter / Billy Bowes / Harold Greenhalgh / Snout / Happy Day / Matthews	10 episodes
1966	Orlando	Johnny	1 episode
1966	This Man Craig	Grandpa Cook	1 episode
1966	Softly, Softly	Parsons / Willie Murchison	2 episodes
1966	Adam Adamant Lives!	Harold	1 episode
1966	King of the River	Nat	3 episodes
1966–1967	Mrs Thursday	Bill Lee	7 episodes
1966; 1968	Thirty-Minute Theatre	Georgie / Charlie Harper	Anthology series, 2 episodes
1967	Look and Read	Stan West	
1967	Mickey Dunne	Cyril	1 episode
1967–1970	The Wednesday Play	Lorry driver / Jack / Toby	Anthology series, 3 episodes
1968	Doctor Who	Griffin the Chef	Episode 3 of "The Enemy of the World"
1968	Mr. Rose	Caretaker	1 episode
1968	The Jazz Age	Ilya Prokhorich	1 episode
1968	The Champions	Curtis	1 episode
1968	Treasure Island	Tom Morgan	8 episodes
1969	The Fossett Saga	Stage Door Keeper	1 episode
1969	The Expert	Mr Atkins	1 episode
1969	W. Somerset Maugham	Pryce	1 episode
1969	Softly Softly: Task Force	Lane	1 episode
1969	Randall and Hopkirk (Deceased)	Manny	1 episode
1969; 1970	The Flaxton Boys	Flintock / Addison	2 episodes
1970	Francis Durbridge's Paul Temple	Billy	1 episode
1970	Smith	The Old Man in the Fireplace	Miniseries, 6 episodes
1970	Manhunt	Georges	1 episode
1970	Ace of Wands	Digger Farmer	2 episodes
1970	The Adventures of Don Quick	Hephaestus	1 episode
1971	Budgie	Old Narky	1 episode
1971	Jason King	Mistral	1 episode
1971	BBC Play of the Month	Peasant	Anthology series, 1 episode
1971–1976	The Dick Emery Show		8 episodes
1972	Owen, M.D.	Martin	2 episodes
1972	The Scobie Man	Reg	3 episodes
1973	The Rivals of Sherlock Holmes	Mortuary Superintendent	Anthology series, 1 episode
1973	Morecambe and Wise	Ranji Khan / Egyptian waiter	2 episodes
1972–1973	The Fenn Street Gang	Parkes / Caretaker	3 episodes
1973	Son of the Bride	Man in shoe shop	1 episode
1973–1974	Two Women	Vincenzo	Miniseries, 4 episodes
1973	The Kids from 47A	Mr Grubb	1 episode
1973	Bowler	Tramp	1 episode
1973	The Dragon's Opponent	2nd Shearer	Miniseries, 1 episode
1973	Arthur of the Britons	Cattle Dealer	1 episode
1973	Freewheelers	Scuttle	2 episodes
1973; 1975	Thriller	Caretaker	Anthology series, 2 episodes
1973–1976	Crown Court	Jack Smith / Tom Bernard	7 episodes
1974	Dracula	Zookeeper	TV movie
1974	The Adventures of Black Beauty	George	1 episode
1974	Thick as Thieves	Norman	2 episodes
1974; 1976	A Little Bit of Wisdom	Porter / Old man	2 episodes
1975	The Tomorrow People	Vanyon	2 episodes
1975	Doctor on the Go	First Porter	1 episode
1975	Six Days of Justice	Fred Curtis	Anthology series, 1 episode
1975	Quiller	Chirac	1 episode
1975	Hogg's Back	Old man	1 episode
1975–1976	Down the 'Gate	Old Wol	12 episodes
1976	Yes, Honestly	Harold	1 episode
1976; 1978	The Ghosts of Motley Hall	Old Gory	2 episodes
1976; 1978	Sykes	Shoplifter / Skipper	2 episodes
1976; 1978	Wings	Tom	10 episodes
1977	Maidens' Trip	Herbert	1 episode
1977	Sea Tales: The Return	Albert	Miniseries, 1 episode
1977	Get Some In!	Barman	1 episode
1977	Ripping Yarns	Mr Bag	1 episode
1977	Jackanory Playhouse	Ben	Anthology series, 1 episode
1978	Whodunnit?	Dan Crabbe	1 episode
1978	Out	Jacob	1 episode
1978	George and Mildred	Father	1 episode
1978	Return of the Saint	Lou	1 episode
1978	The Chiffy Kids	Mr Jameson	1 episode
1979	Park Ranger	Elijah	2 episodes
1979	Sally Ann	Capper	1 episode
1979	A Man Called Intrepid	Newsvendor	Miniseries, 3 episodes
1981	Home Sweet Home	Arthur	1 episode
1983	For the Term of His Natural Life	Blind Mooney	Miniseries, 1 episode
1984	Boy in the Bush	Amos	Miniseries, 2 episodes
1988	Joe Wilson	Jimmy Nowlett	Miniseries, 1 episode

== Theatre ==
=== As actor ===
Year	Title	Role	Notes
1946	How Beautiful With Shoes (workshop)	Judge	New Theatre, Sydney
1946	God Bless the Guv'nor	Drunkard	New Theatre, Sydney
1946	Enemies	Ex-soldier	New Theatre, Sydney
1946	Of Mice and Men		New Theatre, Sydney
1947	Rocket Range	Tribal warrior	New Theatre, Sydney
1947	Sons of the South		New Theatre, Sydney
1947	Woman Bites Dog	Radio producer	New Theatre, Sydney
1947	Deep Are the Roots		New Theatre, Sydney
1947	A Physician in Spite of Himself		New Theatre, Sydney
1948	The Matchgirls		New Theatre, Sydney
1948	The Dangerous Sex		New Theatre, Sydney
1948	A Pickwick Story		Sydney Town Hall with Mercury Theatres
1948	Six Men of Dorset		New Theatre, Sydney
1952	Sky without Birds	Jumbo	New Theatre, Sydney
1952	How He Lied to Her Husband / The Man of Destiny		The Shavian Playhouse, Sydney
1953	Ile		Sydney
	Fumed Oak	Henry Gow	Orange Drama Festival
1958; 1959	The Shifting Heart		Newcastle, Majestic Cinemas, Sydney with AETT
1961	The One Day of the Year	Wacka Dawson	Palace Theatre, Sydney, Theatre Royal, Stratford East, London with AETT & 59 Theatre Company
1971	Enemies	Kon	Aldwych Theatre, London with Royal Shakespeare Company
1971	The Balcony	Beggar	Aldwych Theatre, London with Royal Shakespeare Company
1974	Oedipus Tyrannus	Chorus	Chichester Festival Theatre

=== As director ===
Year	Title	Role	Notes
1948	Stove, Sink and View (workshop)	Director	New Theatre, Sydney
	Rocket Range	Director	Forbes Society

== Radio ==
Year	Title	Role	Notes
1940	Spoiled Darlings	Servant	
	Mr Markham, Antique Dealer	Mr Markham	
