= Jean Scott Rogers =

British screenwriter (1908–2000)

Jean Scott Rogers (18 January 1908 – 2000) was a British writer and film and television screenwriter perhaps best known for her film Corridors of Blood (1958) and for her work for the Children's Film Foundation.

== Biography ==
Jean Scott Rogers was born in Hornsey in London in 1908, the daughter of Grace Brown Rogers (née Blair) and Norman Cumming Rogers, a physician and surgeon. Privately educated in London and Paris, she was the committee secretary for the Royal Society of Arts Exhibition of British Industry at Burlington House (1934–35). In April 1939 she was the stage manager for the pageant 'Music for the People' held at the Royal Albert Hall in London. Rogers was appointed to the war-time staff of the Royal Society of Arts as acting assistant secretary in 1940. In 1943 she was the acting secretary and acting assistant editor of the RSA Journal but resigned in 1947 in order to join the Rank Organisation as a producer's personal assistant, working on Trottie True (1949) among others.

She resigned from Rank in 1957 to work as a freelance film and ITV scriptwriter until 1964. She was the administrator of the campaign to launch the Theatre Museum (1965–1977) and in 1985 published a history of the process by which the museum was set up. Among her films are: One Way Out (original story, 1955); Corridors of Blood (1962), starring Boris Karloff and Christopher Lee; The Flood (1963); Valley of the Kings (1964) and Jackals in the Desert (1964), the latter three for the Children's Film Foundation.

Her writing for television includes three episodes of Family Solicitor (1961); Journey of a Lifetime (1961), and 70 episodes of Emergency – Ward 10 (1957–1964).

Books by Jean Scott Rogers include Stage by Stage: The Making of the Theatre Museum, Her Majesty's Stationery Office (1985) ISBN 978-0112904199; Cobden and His Kate: The Story of a Marriage, Historical Publications Ltd (1990) ISBN 978-0948667114; and In Search of St Paul, A. Barker, London (1964), the latter based on the ABC series of the same name and the writing of which necessitated Rogers joining the film crew on location.

Her papers from 1921 to 1956 are held by The Women's Library at the London School of Economics. Rogers was an acquaintance and correspondent with the Australian writer Patrick White and her collection of 96 letters from him are held by the National Library of Australia.

Jean Scott Rogers died aged 92 in 2000 at Ipswich in Suffolk.
