= Planned Nazi coup and invasion of Uruguay =

Failed plan suppressed in 1940

The planned Nazi coup and invasion of Uruguay (sometimes referred to as The Fuhrmann Plan) was an unexecuted plan to overthrow the government of Uruguay and establish a colony of Nazi Germany. The plan was devised by German-Uruguayan journalist and Nazi activist Arnulf Fuhrmann (also known by his pseudonym Asmuel Fushman), Julio Hotzer (sometimes spelled Holzer), Otto Kleing, Rudolf Patz, and Konas and R. Meissner; with support from Otto Langmann, the German representative in Montevideo. Developed between the late 1930s to 1940 in Salto, the plan was never put to fruition due to the operation being uncovered by Uruguayan officials, leading to the plotters being arrested.

== History ==
=== Background ===
The idea for such an attack was first conceived by Arnulf Fuhrmann, a Uruguayan journalist who had moved to Uruguay from Germany at the tail end of the First World War. In February 1937, Fuhrmann was hired by the Salto newspaper La Campaña as head administrator, eventually being promoted to director in March 1937. At the same time, Fuhrmann's German enclave within Salto established the German-Uruguayan Cultural Center, of which he was elected president. Four months later in July, Fuhrmann left La Campaña, according to the newspaper, "in order to dedicate his energies to other activities."

Fuhrmann was married to the widow of Frederico Jungblut, who was the owner of a photography shop in Salto called Foto Clave. Now independent from La Campaña, Fuhrmann became devoted to photography and Nazi activism, using the Foto Clave to spread anti-Semitic and Nazi propaganda. It was at this time that Fuhrmann and his five co-conspirators began to prepare for the coup, writing down their plans and obtaining supplies.

=== Plan ===
According to their plans, all they needed to succeed were "fifteen days, two regiments and cavalry in Montevideo, two companies in Colonia as well as Fray Bentos, Paysandú ... a battalion in Salto, the same in Bella Unión, two companies in Artigas, two in Rivera, and a battalion in Yaguarón," believing that Uruguayan forces would easily surrender. Once the nation is captured, Fuhrmann would assume control, exterminating any Jews or pre-colonial politicians within Uruguay, turning the state into a "colony of German peasants."

=== Outcome ===
With the breakout of World War II in Europe, the Uruguayan government became less tolerant of Nazism within their borders, with the Tribuna Salteña newspaper in Salto writing that "It is necessary to throw the agents of Nazism out of Uruguayan territory." In June 1940 the Foto Clave shop and Fuhrmann's private resident were raided by Uruguayan officials, leading to Fuhrmann, Hotzer, Kleing, Patz, Konas Meissner, and R. Meissner being arrested; along with their six light machine guns and additional supplies being confiscated. While in detainment, investigators discovered Fuhrmann's notes for the coup but when questioned about this evidence Fuhrmann retorted that it was "merely a joke." Fuhrmann was released shortly after being in police custody, however he was arrested again by Argentinian officials while attempting to cross the Argentinian-Uruguayan border. As the trials were being held in Buenos Aires, Germany attempted to extradite the six convicts back to Berlin, with Argentina declining and sentencing the men to thirteen years in prison. In 1946, the men were released for good behavior; their lives after this becoming unknown.
