= One Jump Ahead (film) =

1955 British film by Charles Saunders

- British theatrical lobby card
- Directed by: Charles Saunders
- Written by: Doreen Montgomery
- Based on: One Jump Ahead (novel) by Robert H. Chapman
- Produced by: Guido Coen
- Starring: Paul Carpenter; Diane Hart; Jill Adams
- Cinematography: Brendan J. Stafford
- Edited by: Margery Saunders
- Music by: Edwin Astley (uncredited)
- Production company: Kenilworth Film Productions
- Distributed by: General Film Distributors (UK)
- Release date: March 1955 (UK)
- Running time: 66 mins
- Country: United Kingdom
- Language: English

One Jump Ahead is a 1955 British second feature ('B') crime film directed by Charles Saunders and starring Paul Carpenter, Diane Hart, Jill Adams and Freddie Mills. The screenplay was by Doreen Montgomery based on the 1951 novel of the same name by Robert H. Chapman.

A journalist helps police track down the killer of a female blackmailer.

== Plot ==
Reporter Paul Banner, a Canadian "noozeman", works at the Daily Comet in England. When a young boy witnesses a murder, the killer mistakenly tracks down the boy's friend and kills him, thinking he was the only witness to the crime. Banner becomes interested in getting to the bottom of the murders but complications arise when Judy, his ex-love, becomes involved.

Banner sets out to find the killer, and has the help of Maxine, a reporter with whom he works at the paper; the two are also on the verge of a relationship. Together, they ferret out who the mystery killer is, keeping "one jump ahead" of the police.

== Cast ==
- Paul Carpenter as Paul Banner
- Diane Hart as Maxine
- Jill Adams as Judy
- Freddie Mills as Bert Tarrant
- Peter Sinclair as Old Tarrant
- Arnold Bell as Superintendent Faro
- David Hannaford as Brian
- Roddy Hughes as Mac
- Edward French as Jimmy Mumby
- June Ashley as Betty West
- Rose Howlett as Mrs. Mumby
- Mary Jones as Mrs. Snell
- Charles Lamb as Mr. Snell
- Arthur Gross as Arthur Walker

== Production ==
Director Charles Saunders also made Behind the Headlines (1956), the second of three crime thrillers based on the works of American novelist Robert Chapman. In 1958, he also directed Murder Reported. All three films had many similarities; the stories all revolved around a news reporter investigating a murder, each lead role played by Paul Carpenter, with different supporting casts. Saunders specialised in B movie at the Kenilworth Films Production house which turned out 11 mainly crime thrillers between 1948 and 1956.

== Critical reception ==
The Monthly Film Bulletin wrote: "Apart from its unconvincing denouement, this is a fairly entertaining comedy-thriller of a modest and unpretentious type. It is agreeably played, has some engagingly drawn characters and, particularly in the early sequences, some bright dialogue. The plot, though, becomes steadily more unlikely as the film progresses."

TV Guide gave One Jump Ahead two out of five stars and wrote, "... occasionally witty dialog enhances this B-bracket programmer."

In British Sound Films: The Studio Years 1928–1959 David Quinlan rated the film as "average", writing: "Dialogue occasionally crackles with humour; not bad of its type. "

SkyChannel TV noted, "Not at all bad for a British co-feature of its time, with some good crackles of humour in the dialogue and a lively tempo. Ex-boxing champion Freddie Mills appears in one of several roles he played in British films of the 50s."
