= Wilma Baker =

American animator (1917–2016)

- Wilma June McAlister, later Baker, from the 1935 yearbook of Glendale High School
- Born: Wilma June McAlister; June 24, 1917; Seattle, Washington, U.S.
- Died: September 4, 2016 (age 99); Laguna Niguel, California, U.S.
- Occupation: Animator

Wilma Baker (June 24, 1917 – September 4, 2016), born Wilma June McAlister, was an American animation artist who worked for Walt Disney Animation Studios from 1937 into the 1990s. Over her long career, she contributed to some of Disney’s most celebrated films and later received a Golden Award from the Animation Guild for her lifetime achievements.

== Early life ==
Wilma June McAlister was born in Seattle,Washington, and raised in Glendale, California, the daughter of Paul Franklin McAlister and Golda Armstrong McAlister. Her father was an architect. She graduated from Glendale High School in 1935.

== Career ==
Baker started her career at Disney as an uncredited inker and painter on Snow White and the Seven Dwarves (1937). She continued working as a painter in the animation department at Disney for several decades, contributing to films such as The Aristocats (1970), Bedknobs and Broomsticks (1971), Pete's Dragon (1977) and The Black Cauldron (1985). She retired from Disney in 1983, as head of the Final Checking Department. Then she returned to work as a final checker, on Fern Gully (1992), and The Hunchback of Notre Dame (1996). In 2015 she appeared in a television documentary called Behind the Magic, recalling her painting work on Snow White, especially in creating Snow White's "blush".

Baker was recognized with a Golden Award from the Animation Guild in 2016. She was among the film industry notables included in the "In Memoriam" portion of 2017 Academy Awards telecast.

== Personal life ==
Wilma McAlister was married twice. She married her first husband, Lewis A. Salmon, in 1939. He died in Belgium during World War II. They had a son, Lawrence. Her second husband was Ted Baker, an editor at Disney. They had three more children together. She died in 2016, aged 99 years, in Laguna Niguel, California.
