= Alyce Canfield =

American writer

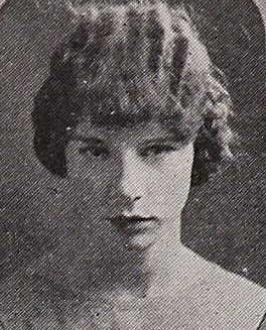
- Alice Castille, later Alyce Canfield, from the 1924 yearbook of Glendale High School
- Born: Alyce M. Castile; February 19, 1909; Los Angeles, California
- Died: December 28, 1963 (aged 54); Encino, California
- Occupations: Writer, journalist

Alyce Castile Canfield (February 19, 1909 – December 28, 1963), born Alyce M. Castile, was an American writer and journalist. She wrote short fiction and covered film stars for magazines, and co-wrote celebrity autobiographies.

== Early life and education ==
Alyce Castile was born in Los Angeles, the daughter of Andrew Blaine Castile and Mabel E. Castile. Her father was a landscape architect born in Nebraska, and her mother was a restaurant manager, born in Mexico. The Castile family lived in Manhattan Beach in the 1910s, and in Glendale in the 1920s. She attended Glendale High School, at the same time as John Wayne. In childhood she worked as an extra in silent films. She attended the University of California, Los Angeles, where she was a columnist for the Daily Bruin.

== Career ==
Canfield was "considered one of the most prolific free-lance writers in Hollywood today," according to a 1947 profile, Her byline was frequently seen in celebrity magazines in the 1940s and 1950s, including Motion Picture Magazine, Screenland, Liberty, Screen Stars, Screen Guide, TV Revue, Coronet, and Movieland. She co-wrote autobiographical books with director Mervyn LeRoy and cosmetic surgeon Robert Alan Franklyn. Her final book was God in Hollywood (1961) which was an attempt "to document the religious lives of movie stars."

Canfield also wrote for radio and television. She promoted the career of actor Keefe Brasselle, who had been her assistant on a publicity job. In her last years, she was a writer and executive producer for a television program, Underground USA. Films based on works by Canfield included Models Inc. (1952) and Death Over My Shoulder (1958).

== Books ==
- It Takes More Than Talent (1953, with Mervyn LeRoy)
- Beauty Surgeon (1960, with Robert Alan Franklyn)
- God in Hollywood (1961)

== Personal life ==
Castile married columnist Homer Cisne Canfield in 1931. Her second husband was William Randall "Jerry" Jerome; they married in 1948. "Despondent over a lengthy illness," she died by suicide in 1963, at the age of 54, on the Ventura Freeway in Encino, California. Geraldine Russell, mother of actress Jane Russell, conducted Canfield's funeral service in Hollywood.
