= The Flying Doctor (TV series) =

British television series

- Written by: Michael Noonan
- Directed by: David MacDonald
- Starring: Richard Denning
- Countries of origin: United Kingdom; Australia
- Original language: English
- No. of seasons: 2
- No. of episodes: 39

Production
- Producer: Hamilton Inglis
- Production location: Elstree Studios
- Running time: 30 minutes

The Flying Doctor is a 1959 British television series made in Britain and Australia. It starred Richard Denning and was created by Michael Noonan. It ran for 39 episodes of 30 minutes.

== Cast ==
- Richard Denning as Dr. Greg Graham
- Jill Adams as Mary Meredith
- Alan White as Charley Wood
- James Copeland as Alec Macleod
- Peter Madden as Dr. Jim Harrison

== Background ==
The show was based on a BBC radio series of the same name. This starred Bill Kerr, James Mackechnie, and Bettina Dickson.

Ted Willis claimed he got the idea for the series from when he visited Australia. He pitched the idea of a TV series about the Flying Doctors to Associated British, which was enthusiastic. As Willis was busy writing other series he arranged for Michael Noonan to write episodes.

The series was filmed at Elstree studios in London with location work done in Australia. Finance came from Associated British. It was originally announced that 26 episodes would be made. Sir Phillip, chairman of Associated British, called the series an enterprise of very great importance to Australia in view of its challenging immigration programme and “our joint desire to establish a Commonwealth co-operative effort in the rapidly expanding field of television entertainment.”

In March 1958 two executives from Associated British, director David MacDonald and producer Hamilton Inglis, arrived in Australia to shoot footage. They said Michael Noonan would supervise the scripts and filming of at least 39 episodes would begin in a few weeks. They also said over 200 actors had been seen for the lead three roles. Noonan reported he had written the first season of 13 episodes and that the second season of 13 episodes had been completed by English writers or Australian writers living in England. The Australian Broadcasting Commission were meant to give a guarantee that it would buy the series.

Willis wrote "Mike wrote a half-dozen fine scripts and all looked set fair for The Flying Doctor. Then the roof fell in and our intended epic turned into disaster. An American company heard about the project and offered to put in finance and what they called ‘production know-how’. [Associated's head of production] Robert Clark, who never turned away money on principle, promptly accepted and the studios were invaded by an American producer, of whom I had never heard, and his assistant." These were the team of Grosse and Krasne. According to Willis "within weeks, the pair of them performed the reverse of the old alchemist’s trick and transmuted the gold of Mike Noonan’s scripts into base mid-Atlantic metal." This included adding star Richard Denning.

Background footage was shot in Australia in July 1958.

Willis said, "This garbage was actually filmed, with a fading American B-feature actor in the lead. The lines were bad enough but he delivered them with all the emotional intensity of a turnip."

By April 1959 the first thirteen episodes had been shot.

== Reception ==
Reviewing "A Pair of Eyes" Variety wrote that based on the series the flying doctors "seems to operate just like any other fevered segment of a screenwriter's imagination as in B pictures down the years... ought to do alright with the unsophisticated viewership."

Willis wrote, "The series, of course, was a massive failure. The Australians, incensed by what they saw as an insult to their magnificent Flying Doctors, refused to take the programme and it died the death here and in America. Long before this, Mike and I had quit the project in disgust." The ABC decided not to purchase the series after seeing the pilot.

By November 1961 the series had not sold to American television.

== Novels ==
Michael Noonan later wrote a series of novels about the Flying Doctors featuring a Dr Jeremy James.

== Notes ==
- Willis, Ted (1991). Evening all : fifty years over a hot typewriter. Macmillan.
