= Dust in the Sun =

1958 Australian film by Lee Robinson

- Directed by: Lee Robinson
- Written by: Lee Robinson; Joy Cavill; W. P. Lipscomb
- Based on: Justin Bayard by Jon Cleary
- Produced by: Chips Rafferty
- Starring: Jill Adams; Ken Wayne; Robert Tudawali
- Cinematography: Carl Kayser
- Edited by: Stanley Moore
- Music by: Wilbur Sampson
- Production company: Southern International Productions
- Distributed by: Universal (Australia)
- Release dates: 3 October 1958 (premiere); 12 August 1960 (Australia)
- Running time: 86 mins
- Country: Australia
- Language: English
- Budget: £50,000

Dust in the Sun is a 1958 Eastmancolor Australian mystery film adapted from the 1955 novel Justin Bayard by Jon Cleary and produced by the team of Lee Robinson and Chips Rafferty. The film stars British actress Jill Adams, Ken Wayne and an Indigenous Australian actor Robert Tudawali as Emu Foot.

It was the first flop from Robinson and Rafferty, after three successful films.

== Synopsis ==
Justin Bayard, a Northern Territory policeman, is escorting an Aboriginal warrior, Emu Foot, to Alice Springs to be tried for a tribal killing. They are attacked by some Aboriginals and Emu Fut saves Bayard's life.

They are forced to take refuge at an isolated cattle station, run by Tad Kirkbridge, who is married to Julie. The workers there include a foreman, and Spider, an Aboriginal stockrider.

Julie, who comes from the city, hates outback life and lets Emu Foot free. Bayard manages to reconcile Julie and Tad and they discuss moving to Sydney, while Bayara romances Chris, daughter of the station foreman.

Julie is murdered. The main suspect is Emu Foot, who is killed by the Aboriginals chasing after him.

It turns out Julie was killed by Spider, who was trying to help Tad. He tries to kill Bayard but he is rescued by Chris, and Spider kills himself. Despite his attraction to Chris, Bayard leaves.

== Cast ==
- Jill Adams as Julie Kirkbride
- Ken Wayne as Justin Bayard
- Maureen Lanagan as Chris Palady
- Robert Tudawali as Emu Foot
- James Forrest as Tad Kirkbride
- Jack Hume as Ned Palady
- Henry Murdoch as Spider
- Reg Lye as Dirks
- Alan Light as Inspector Prichett

== Development ==
By 1956 Lee Robinson and Chips Rafferty had made three successful feature films together as producers, all starring Rafferty and directed by Robinson. In May 1956 they bought the film studios at Bondi which were once owned by Cinesound Productions. It was meant to be used as a basis for their television company, Australian Television Enterprises, but it was used for this film.

They optioned Jon Cleary's novel Justin Bayard which had been published in 1955 and already adapted for radio in 1956. Robinson said " it was very much more a 'story' film than the others were", adding:

On that film we were aiming to do very well in the English market, because we had always done well there. For instance King of the Coral Sea earned much more than its production cost out of England whilst it earned its production cost in Australia. Walk into Paradise had also gone terribly well in England. England was a very strong market for us at that time. In fact it was probably a better market for us than the United States.

Robinson and Rafferty had worked with French producers on Walk into Paradise. Robinson said later "they wanted us to do the next picture with them. They wouldn't do another one with us; it had to be their second choice. So we said, 'Well in that case, you'll have to wait a little while, because we're committed to this picture [Dust in the Sun]. It's all scheduled and it's ready to go." And that's how Paradise was done, and then Dust was done straight after it. Then their choice was Stowaway, the Georges Simenon thing. So then we did the next one with them. We also did a picture called Hula Hula. It was an Italian-French co production and our unit shot it."

The script was written by Bill Lipscomb, a very experienced screenwriter who had done a number of Australian-themed movies and was friendly with Robinson. He said Lipscomb wrote the script "as a favour" to him for very little money.

Cleary had little to do with the film even though director Lee Robinson had worked for him in the Army; as late as 2006 he claimed he had never seen it.

== Casting ==
This was the fourth feature from Lee Robinson and Chips Rafferty but the first one in which Rafferty did not act. Robinson later said, "This was the first picture that Chips wasn't in. There was no possibility. There was nothing there for Chips to play. In Stowaway there was nothing for Chips. Walk into Paradise was the last film that really served the function of what Chips really designed the operation for."

However, according to Charles Tingwell Rafferty was originally meant to play the role of Justin Bayard, while Tingwell was going to play the station manager. Tingwell claimed Rafferty decided against playing Bayard when Robinson wanted to increase the emphasis on the romantic subplot involving that character, as the actor thought he was too old. (Rafferty had received a poor critical reception for his performances in Eureka Stockade and The Loves of Joanna Godden where he played characters with romantic storylines).

Tingwell says Robinson then offered the lead to Tingwell, who claimed he was too short and wrong for the role, and instead Tingwell suggested Ken Wayne. Robinson was originally reluctant to work with Wayne and instead cast New Zealand actor Walter Brown. Brown had just appeared on stage in Teahouse of the Autumn Moon. (In August 1956 it was reported American star John Ericson was sought to play the lead role although it is unclear how serious this was.) Tingwell did not appear in the final movie.

Jill Adams was imported from England to play the female lead. Robinson said he cast her on the basis of her performance in Doctor at Sea. She arrived in Sydney on 11 September 1956. Robinson called her "a very competent actress".

Robinson said, "We went all over the bloody place," to find actors. "We went to Sydney, Melbourne and Adelaide trying to cast the picture. And there were not film actors in Australia. You look at 'Showcast' today [in 1976] - It's that thick. But at that time there were four of five people who could say that they were compete film actors. There just weren't the people to cast.. And that is one of the reasons why nobody really came through that period as a director. This was because a director was really an acting coach... When you see Stanley Kramer doing On the Beach or Fred Zinneman doing The Sundowners, you realise that you've not been a director at all. You've been a coach and a technical director."

Maureen Lanagan was a Sydney model making her first film – Robinson also used models turned actors in The Phantom Stockman and King of the Coral Sea. (He often expressed frustration at what he saw was a lack of good looking young women who could act in Australia.)

This was Robert Tudawali's second film role after Jedda. His contract was negotiated by Southern International, Actors Equity and the Department of Native Affairs. In September 1956 he signed to play his role at £40 a week plus a bonus of £50 if the film was televised. Robinson says "he played very much the character he played in Jedda. He even had a red narga (loincloth) like he had in Jedda. And we kept the same look of him, because that was his image."

John Forrest was a newsreader from Adelaide. Rafferty later announced he would star in the next Robinson-Rafferty film, The Stowaway, but this did not happen. Filmink later argued a key problem of the film was inadequate casting, in particular using too many inexperienced actors and not employing Rafferty.

== Production ==
Jill Adams flew out of Sydney on 13 September 1956 for seven weeks of filming near Alice Springs.

Shooting took place in the studio at Bondi and on location near Alice Springs in October and November 1956. The movie featured more indoor scenes than Robbinson and Rafferty's first three films, in part because they had bought a studio comple in Sydney and wanted to use it.

Three weeks into filming Robinson and Rafferty decided to fire Brown because he seemed "too soft". They offered his role to Tingwell, who declined, and then cast Ken Wayne. Robinson later recalled that Brown:

Wouldn't play the role the way that he was directed to play the role. There were a number of confrontations with Walter. And it eventually got to a head, and he was fired... We re-cast and put Ken in. And you know ... Ken was y'know, a bit dicey. And the thing I didn't like about Ken was his voice. And it's not generally known that Ken's entire performance was post-synched in London by Alan White.... He agreed that there was an abrasive character in his voice, Ken; and that Whitey's soft voice could add to his performance. And very few people know that that was ever done.

== Release ==
Lobby card

The film took some time to be released. On 23 August 1958 Lee Robinson announced Dust in the Sun and The Stowaway (a movie he made immediately after Dust) were going to be released by Universal in Australia. Robinson said, "I consider this deal is a relevant comment on recent statements that the Australian film industry is failing for lack of support."

The film premiered at the 5th Sydney Film Festival on 3 October 1958 at Sydney University. The Bulletin called it "the worst film shown" at the festival with "a cheap, improbable story... crudely acted and edited, lapsing at times into absurd cliches."

The movie was not released in general cinemas until 1960. "Couldn't get it released," said Robinson. "This was the television problem at that time [television had been introduced to Australia in late 1956]... there was absolutely no market. Nobody would release an Australian picture. Wouldn't."

Dust in the Sun was released in England in July 1960 as "a circuit release" on a double bill with Follow that Horse. Kinematograph Weekly said "The picture is very "paper back" and, despite its "A" certificate, "Boys' Own Paper" so far as its story goes, but nevertheless finds a valid excuse to introduce typical Australian types and explore superb scenery. Jill Adams wins little sympathy, but is easy on the eyes as Julie, Ken Wayne sits a horse well as Justin, and Robert Tudawali cuts a striking figure as the ebony Emu Foot, and the rest show willing. To return to its terrain, & equals anything furnished by American oaters and definitely tips the scales in the opus's favour."

The film did not achieve a general release in Australia until August 1960 when it screened in Sydney. The Sydney Sun Herald said "Southern International wastes rich material" with the film "for the human drama is awkwardly handled, taken at a lead-heavy pace and acted, with three exceptions, by a wincingly stagy group." The exceptions, according to the critic, were Wayne, Tudawali and Henry Murdoch. It felt the scenery was "strikingly captured" but that Robinson "has no feeling... for outback people."

It was shown in Melbourne in February 1961 on a double bill with The Leech Woman; The Age critic Colin Bennett called Dust in the Sun "barely competent technically and dreadfully leaden in its pace... Mr Robinson appears unable to win any sort of vitality or spontaneous response from his cast... Some good visual and narrative material goes to waste." Bennett gave the film another poor review the following week in an article on the state of the Australian film industry, saying "as a B picture Western quickie, Dust in the Sun would pass muster. As the only feature film Australia can show in years, it will not do." Filmink noted "Colin Bennett of The Age made the point of bagging it in two separate articles – thanks Colin.

Robinson said the film was not released "anywhere else. Couldn't get it out in America." It played a number of times on Australian television.

Dust in the Sun did not perform well at the box office. In 1964, Rafferty said of his later films with Robinson, "These were good films, but they were all 90-minute pictures, designed to be shown in theatres. TV finished the 90-minute programme film, which has practically disappeared from the face of the earth."

According to Raffety's biographer "with television making serious inroads into movie attendances world wide and no Chips Rafferty to exploit for distribution, Dust in the Sun was just another badly made independent cheapie, and gathered its own dust on the shelf for some four years."

Lee Robinson later reflected, "I don't think it was a good script and I don't think that we had a very strong supporting cast and it was the first picture that we had done in which Chips didn't play the lead... I think our mistake there was to make a picture not geared for Chips." He said in another interview:

I don't think it was good enough. I remember sitting in screenings with the Americans. And one bloke told me - I think it was Red Silverstein at Metro [MGM]. He said, "At the end of the first reel, I was trying to work out how much I could try and gyp you for." For the first reel in Dust is very good. It's the native attack thing and all that. Reel one, you say, "This is it, this is the Australian picture." It never holds up to it from that point on... [because] performances are all ... You know, there was a hell of a problem in the fifties to get a group of actors together who could act for a film... There just weren't the people to cast.

Filmink later called the film "a kind-of Western that should have been more of a Western. It has a whiff of the white man's burden movie about it like Where No Vultures Fly – Wayne is a solid no nonsense public servant dealing with troublesome natives and snarly whites. It's a little bit progressive but not exactly PC – Tudawli's character has a chain around his neck for a lot of the film and is talked about as if he's a dog. Still, the location filming helps and Tudawali has charisma to burn." The same magazine later argued "Robinson was strong on locations and visuals, and weak at directing actors and building tension; he made a movie that had lots of scenes indoors with weak actors. Dust in the Sun needed more scenes outdoors and much better actors."

The movie was the first job in the Australian industry for Jill Robb, who was Jill Adams' stand-in and went on to become a leading producer.

== Notes ==
- Larkin, Bob Chips: The Life and Films of Chips Rafferty, MacMillan 1986
