= Crosstrap =

1962 British film by Robert Hartford-Davis

- Opening title
- Directed by: Robert Hartford-Davis
- Screenplay by: Philip Wrestler
- Based on: novel The Last Seven Hours by John Newton Chance
- Produced by: Michael Deeley; George Mills
- Starring: Laurence Payne; Jill Adams; Gary Cockrell
- Cinematography: Eric Cross
- Edited by: Harry Booth
- Music by: Steve Race
- Distributed by: Unifilms Ltd.
- Release date: January 1962
- Running time: 62 minutes
- Country: United Kingdom
- Language: English

Crosstrap is a 1962 British B-movie crime film directed by Robert Hartford-Davis, starring Laurence Payne, Jill Adams and Gary Cockrell. The screenplay was by Philip Wrestler, adapted from the 1956 novel The Last Seven Hours by John Newton Chance.

== Plot ==
Novelist Geoff and his wife Sally rent an isolated countryside bungalow to enable Geoff to finish his latest book without the distractions of life in London. On their arrival, they are horrified to find a dead man in the property; before they can report the discovery they are confronted by Duke, a gangland boss, and his henchmen who have, it transpires, been using the empty property as a hide-out for stolen valuables which they are planning to smuggle out of the country. A rival gangster, Juan, also has his eye on the goods and has discovered their whereabouts. The dead man is one of his minions.

Geoff and Sally are held captive, and matters take a turn for the worse when Juan and his men also arrive on the scene, forcing a stand-off between the two factions during which Geoff and Sally are roughly-treated by both sides. Duke starts to fall for Sally, and his obvious interest in her antagonises his girlfriend Rina. Eventually there is a bloody shoot-out between the rival gangs, with Duke's men getting the better of the exchange. Duke and his gang board the plane to make good their escape with the valuables, but the plane is shot at before takeoff by the jealous and vengeful Rina, first shooting the pilot and then hitting the fuel tank, after which the plane bursts into flames, killing all 4 people on board.

== Cast ==
- Laurence Payne as Duke
- Jill Adams as Sally
- Gary Cockrell as Geoff
- Zena Marshall as Rina
- Bill Nagy as Gaunt
- Robert Cawdron as Joe
- Larry Taylor as Peron
- Max Faulkner as Ricky
- Derek Sydney as Juan
- Michael Turner as Hoagy

== Reception ==
Monthly Film Bulletin said "Overacted, ludicrous and amateurish, this so-called thriller finally explodes in a merry crescendo of guns, fists and bloodletting. The build-up, on the other hand, is laboured in the extreme."

Kine Weekly said "Brawny, but brainless, British romantic crime melodrama. .. The picture, cheap crime fiction, takes a long while to unravel its plot and then goes to the other extreme and polishes off the bad lads with ludicrous haste. Laurence Payne fancies himself much too much as Duke, and Jill Adams and Gage Cockrell are no great shakes as Sally and Geoffrey. The rest also lack finesse. The country exteriors are, however, impressive, and cameraman Eric Cross definitely deserves a hand."

According to the British Film Institute (BFI), The Daily Cinema wrote: "incredible but lively tale of gang-warfare, packed with hearty action and intrigue, plus a spot of sex for flavour" offering "robust ... programme support", with a "climactic blood-bath where corpses bite the dust as freely as Indians in a John Ford western".

== Post-release ==
Crosstrap was originally released to cinemas as a supporting film in January 1962 by Unifilms Ltd. Unusually for a supporting feature, it was later picked up by Monarch Films for another cinema outing as a double-bill feature in 1967. There was no record of the film after this point. There was no indication that it was ever shown on television in the UK, and attempts to trace a print of the film proved fruitless for decades.

== Preservation status ==
It was one of two Hartford-Davis films – the other being Nobody Ordered Love (1971) – that the BFI included on its 2010 "75 Most Wanted" list of missing British feature films. The BFI reported that a black-and-white negative of the film was discovered in the early 2010s and digitally scanned. It was screened on Talking Pictures TV on 9 March 2018 and 3 October 2019. It was also available for viewing on the BFI player website.

== See also ==
- List of rediscovered films
