= Michael Davis (defensive back) =

American football player (born 1995)

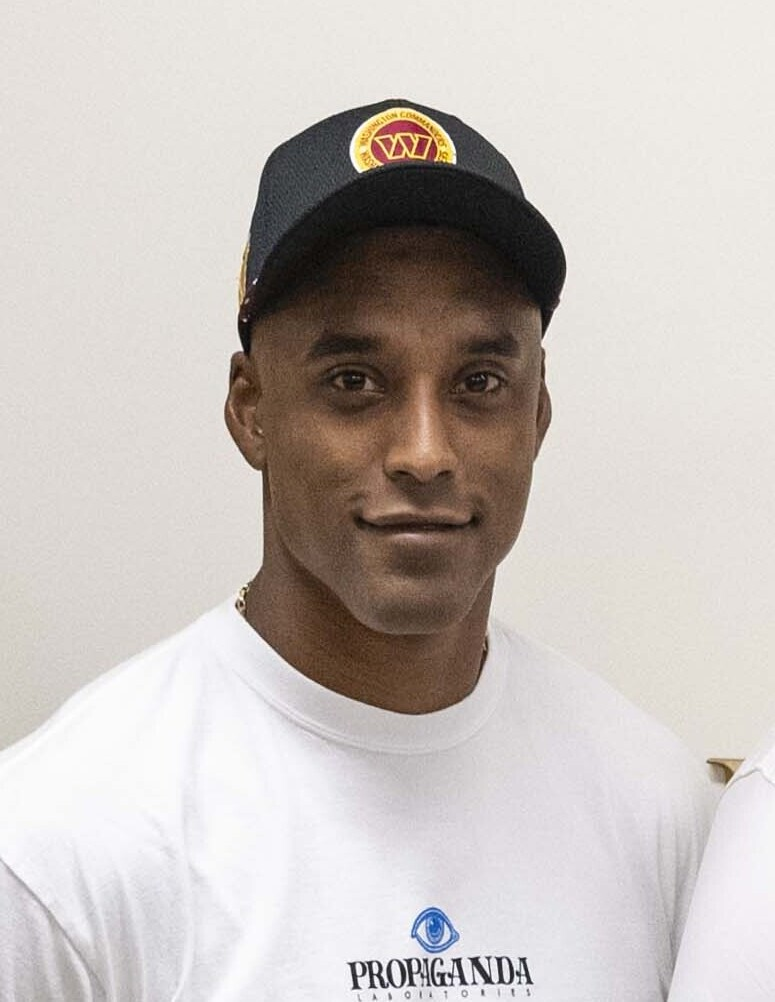
- Davis with the Washington Commanders in 2024

Profile
- Position: Cornerback

Personal information
- Born: January 6, 1995 (age 31); Glendale, California, U.S.
- Listed height: 6 ft 2 in (1.88 m)
- Listed weight: 196 lb (89 kg)

Career information
- High school: Glendale
- College: BYU (2013–2016)
- NFL draft: 2017: undrafted

Career history
- Los Angeles Chargers (2017–2023); Washington Commanders (2024); New Orleans Saints (2025)

Career NFL statistics as of 2025
- Tackles: 367
- Forced fumbles: 1
- Fumble recoveries: 2
- Pass deflections: 70
- Interceptions: 8
- Defensive touchdowns: 1
- Stats at Pro Football Reference

Michael Keith Davis II (born January 6, 1995) is an American professional football cornerback. He played college football for the BYU Cougars and signed with the Los Angeles Chargers as an undrafted free agent in 2017. Davis has also played for the Washington Commanders.

== Early life ==
Davisw was born on January 6, 1995, in Glendale, California. He has an African American father and Mexican mother, with him being raised Catholic by his mother. Davis participated in the Glendale High School football and track and field teams. During his senior year, he earned first-team All-CIF, league, & area honors. In track and field, Davis had won the Pacific League title in the 100-meter sprint 3 straight years and the 200-meter sprint 4 straight years. He ran the 100 and 200-meter dash with best times of 10.5 and 21.3. Davis also qualified for the California State Championship Meet for the 200 his junior and senior years. In 2012, he finished seventh overall, and finished fifth overall in 2013.

== College career ==
Davis attended BYU from 2013 to 2016, and totaled 110 tackles and 17 pass break-ups in his four seasons there. Davis lost his starting position for a time during his senior season, but came off the bench to make the biggest play of his career, an interception and 40-yard return on the road against Michigan State that helped the Cougars secure a 31–14 upset victory.

== Professional career ==
Pre-draft measurables
Height	Weight	Arm length	Hand span	Wingspan	40-yard dash	10-yard split	20-yard split	20-yard shuttle	Three-cone drill	Vertical jump	Broad jump	Bench press
6 ft 1 5/8 in (1.87 m)	190 lb (86 kg)	31 5/8 in (0.80 m)	9 1/2 in (0.24 m)	6 ft 3 in (1.91 m)	4.34 s	1.60 s	2.59 s	4.34 s	7.03 s	29.0 in (0.74 m)	10 ft 2 in (3.10 m)	12 reps
All values from Pro Day

=== Los Angeles Chargers ===
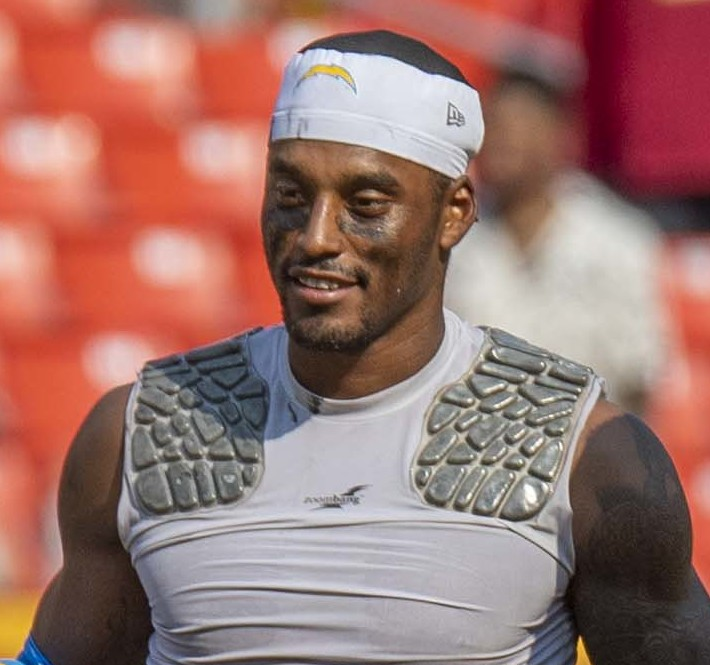
Davis with the Los Angeles Chargers in 2021

Davis was signed by the Los Angeles Chargers as an undrafted free agent on May 1, 2017. He was waived on September 2, 2017 and was signed to the Chargers' practice squad the next day. He was promoted to the active roster on September 16, 2017.

Davis was suspended two games by the NFL for violating the league's substance abuse policy on November 22, 2019. He was reinstated from suspension on December 9, 2019, and activated two days later.

On April 9, 2020, Davis was re-signed to a one-year, $3.259 million contract. In Week 4 against the Tampa Bay Buccaneers, Davis intercepted a pass thrown by Tom Brady and returned it 78 yards for a touchdown during the 38–31 loss. On March 15, 2021, Davis signed a 3-year contract extension with the Chargers worth 25.2 million dollars.

=== Washington Commanders ===
Davis signed a one-year contract with the Washington Commanders on March 18, 2024. He finished the 2024 regular season with 14 tackles and one pass deflection over 15 games (with two starts). The Commanders deactivated Davis for all three post-season games that the team played in.

=== New Orleans Saints ===
On October 7, 2025, Davis signed with the New Orleans Saints. He made 11 appearances for New Orleans, playing primarily as a special teamer, and recorded four combined tackles. On January 2, 2026, Davis was placed on season-ending injured reserve due to a shoulder injury suffered in Week 17 against the Tennessee Titans.

On August 26, 2026, Davis re–signed with the Saints. On August 30, Davis was released by New Orleans as a part of final roster cuts.

== Personal life ==
Davis is Catholic.
