= The Dock Brief (play) =

Play by John Mortimer

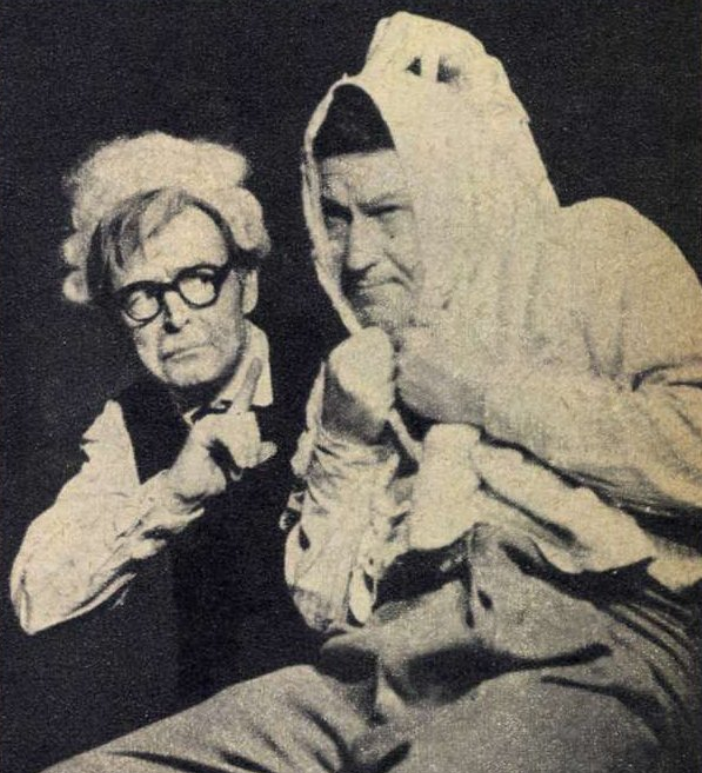
Ludovic Antal as the barrister (left) and Sandu Sticlaru in a 1965 Romanian adaptation of The Dock Brief

The Dock Brief is a play by John Mortimer. It is a two-hander play that has been adapted many times.

It was the first piece he wrote for actors although he had written several novels previously.

== Origins ==
=== Background ===
The play was originally devised for radio. Mortimer was a barrister and got the idea for the play from the real-life practice of the Dock Brief, where criminals could pick a barrister to defend them. Mortimer wrote "I wanted to say something about the lawyer's almost pathetic dependence on the criminal classes, without whom he would be unemployed, and I wanted to find a criminal who would be sorrier for his luckless advocate than he was for himself."

Mortimer enjoyed writing the play for actors "at a new level of reality, one that was two feet above the ground." Mortimer said he had no trouble writing for the barrister but struggled writing the criminal until the director Nesta Pain said the criminal was the sort of person who would "never use one word when six could do".

The play was first performed as a radio play on the BBC on 16 May 1957 for the Third Programme. Michael Hordern played Morganhall and David Kossoff played Fowle.

The play was well received. Mortimer says the BBC awarded him a bonus of £20.

=== 1957 BBC television version ===
Following on from the success of the radio adaptation, the BBC produced a version for television. It aired in September 1957 and again featured Hordern as Morganhall.

The Manchester Guardian called it "a masterpiece".

== 1958 Stage play ==
A stage play version was performed in 1958 on a double bill with another Mortimer play, What Shall We Tell Caroline?. The play was popular; it did not have a long run but it launched Mortimer as a playwright and led to offers to write screenplays.

It was performed on Broadway in 1961.

== Later adaptations ==
=== 1960 Australian TV version ===
The play was adapted for Australian TV in 1960.

=== 1962 feature film ===
The play was turned into a feature film in 1962 starring Peter Sellers.

== Notes ==
- Mortimer, John. Clinging to the Wreckage. Penguin.
