= Jill Adams =

English actress, artist and model (1930–2008)

- Born: Jillian Mary Marguerite Siggins; 22 July 1930; London, England
- Died: 13 May 2008 (aged 77); Clareance, Portugal
- Other name: Elizabeth Gillian
- Occupations: Model; actress; restaurateur
- Years active: 1953–2000
- Spouses: Jim Adams (m. 1951–1953); Peter Haigh (m. 1957–1976)
- Children: 2
- Parent(s): Molly Adair; Arthur James Siggins

Jill Adams (born Jillian Mary Marguerite Siggins; 22 July 1930 – 13 May 2008) was an English actress, artist and fashion model. She featured or starred in over 25 films during the 1950s and 1960s.

== Early life ==
Adams was born in London in 1930, the daughter of the silent-screen actress Molly Adair (real name Mary Marguerite Potter). Jill's New Zealand-born father, Arthur James Siggins, had met the Irish-American Adair when she was on location filming The Blue Lagoon (1923). Siggins, a former member of the British South Africa Police and an expert animal handler, worked on the film The Four Feathers (1921) and later wrote a book about the experience, Shooting with Rifle and Camera.

Jill was one of four children. When she was six years old, Jill moved to Wales, where she continued her education, after which she worked for four years on a farm. Her ambition was to become an artist, and she moved to London to pursue that career, working as a sales assistant, secretary, and window dresser. After working as a window dresser, by 1944 Adams was an assistant artist at Mr & Mrs Jones, a department store, where she was required to attend fashion shows and sketch the clothes. One day, a model failed to arrive, and Adams, found to be the perfect size, stepped in, thus beginning her modelling career, which included a flag-hoisting recruitment poster for the Women's Royal Naval Service. During her modelling days, she was "discovered" and began an acting career that spanned two decades.

== Film career ==
The same year, Jill Adams participated in a late-night stage revue, On with the New, starring Anthony Newley, and she began taking bit roles in movies – dancing with Nigel Patrick in Forbidden Cargo, appearing in The Young Lovers (1954), The Black Knight (1954), Out of the Clouds (1955), the Arthur Askey comedy The Love Match (1955), and Doctor at Sea (1955) with Dirk Bogarde. She also appeared in episodes of the television series The Vise and Aggie.

Adams had one of her first substantial roles in the sprightly "quota quickie" movie One Jump Ahead (1955), in a rare villainous portrayal as a murderess who was once an old flame of a reporter (Paul Carpenter) who is usually "one jump ahead" of the police. Adams was one of Rex Harrison's seven wives in the sophisticated comedy The Constant Husband (1955).

Her most notable films were comedies, at which she excelled, such as Doctor at Sea (1955), Value for Money (1955), Private's Progress (1956), Brothers in Law (1957) and The Green Man (1956), in which she starred with Alastair Sim and George Cole. She also did some stage and radio work.

Adams had the leading role in a low-budget crime film, One Way Out (1955), and a TV series, Wideawake (1957). She had roles in episodes of My Pal Bob and Educated Evans.

Adams appeared with Richard Attenborough in The Scamp (1957) and was given star billing in an Australian movie, Dust in the Sun (1958), but it had limited distribution.

In 1960/61 she featured in a television series, The Flying Doctor, based on the real-life activities of the Royal Flying Doctor Service serving the Australian outback but filmed in Australia.

Her career at this point seemed to lose direction. Death Over My Shoulder (1958) and Crosstrap (1960) had been poor "B" movies, and her roles in Carry On Constable (1960) and Doctor in Distress (1963) were small. The Yellow Teddy Bears (1963) was an exploitation thriller (its US title was Gutter Girls), and her small role in Promise Her Anything (1965), starring Warren Beatty and Leslie Caron, was to be her last.

== Personal life ==
In 1951 she married, firstly, a young American navy yeoman, Jim Adams, whose surname she adopted professionally. The marriage resulted in the birth of a daughter, Tina.

At the peak of her acting career in 1957, Adams married, secondly, the well-known BBC TV and radio personality Peter Haigh and had a second daughter, Peta Louise. In 1971, the whole family moved to the Algarve, in southern Portugal, where they ran a small hotel for several years in the village of Albufeira.

When her second marriage ended, she continued with a restaurant career, accompanied by her partner Mike. Some years later she retired from the business and, with her new partner, Alan "Buster" Jones, an accountant, went to live just outside Lisbon. They later moved to Spain, where they enjoyed homes close to Alicante, then Barcelona and eventually in the Costa del Sol.

After Buster died in 1996, she moved back to Portugal to be with her granddaughter, Emma, and her great-granddaughter, Tania, and began painting again. She had cancer from 2005 until her death in 2008.

== Filmography ==
=== Film ===
- Forbidden Cargo (1954) as Michael's Dance Partner (uncredited)
- The Young Lovers (1954) as Judy (uncredited)
- The Black Knight (1954) as Extra (uncredited)
- The Love Match (1955) as Clarrie (uncredited)
- Out of the Clouds (1955) Bit Part (uncredited)
- One Jump Ahead (1955) as Judy
- The Constant Husband (1955) as Joanna
- Doctor at Sea (1955) as Jill
- Value for Money (1955) as Joy
- One Way Out (1955) as Shirley Harcourt
- Count of Twelve (1955)
- Private's Progress (1956) as Prudence Greenslade
- The Green Man (1956) as Ann Vincent
- Brothers in Law (1957) as Sally Smith
- The Scamp (1957) as Julie Cunningham
- Death Over My Shoulder (1958) as Evelyn Connors
- Dust in the Sun (1958) as Julie Kirkbridge
- Carry On Constable (1960) as WPC Harrison
- Crosstrap (1962) as Sally
- The Yellow Teddy Bears (1963) as June Wilson
- Doctor in Distress (1963) as Genevieve
- The Comedy Man (1964) as Jan Kennedy (uncredited)
- Promise Her Anything (1965) as Mrs. B.M. von Crispin (final film role)

=== Television ===
- The Vise (1955) as Wendy Graves
- The Adventures of Aggie (1956) as Pam
- Educated Evans as Gloria
- My Pal Bob (1958) as Jill
- The Flying Doctor (1959) as Mary Meredith
- No Hiding Place (1963) as Peggy Dawson
