= Models Inc. (film) =

1952 film by Reginald LeBorg

- Theatrical release poster
- Directed by: Reginald LeBorg
- Screenplay by: Paul Yawitz; Harry Essex
- Story by: Alyce Canfield
- Produced by: Bernard W. Burton; Hal E. Chester
- Starring: Howard Duff; Coleen Gray; John Howard
- Cinematography: Stanley Cortez
- Edited by: Bernard W. Burton
- Music by: Herschel Burke Gilbert
- Production companies: Mutual Productions; Jack Dietz Productions
- Distributed by: Universal Pictures
- Release dates: April 18, 1952 (Hartford, Connecticut); May 24, 1952 (New York)
- Running time: 73 minutes
- Country: United States
- Language: English

Models Inc. (also presented as Models, Inc. in promotional materials) is a 1952 American crime film noir directed by Reginald LeBorg and starring Howard Duff, Coleen Gray and John Howard. The film's sets were designed by the art director Ernst Fegté.

The film was released in the UK as That Kind of Girl.

== Plot ==
A young woman becomes involved in a racket in which beautiful young models marry for money.

== Cast ==
- Howard Duff as Lennie Stone
- Coleen Gray as Rusty Faraday
- John Howard as John Stafford
- Marjorie Reynolds as Peggy Howard
- Louis Jean Heydt as Cronin
- Edwin Max as Looie
- Benny Baker as Freddy
- James Seay as Det. Sgt. Mooney
- Charles Cane as Big Jim
- Sue Carlton as Ann
- Lou Lubin as Max
- Paula Hill as Millie (as Mary Hill)
- Frank Ferguson as Joe Reynolds

== Reception ==
In a contemporary review for The New York Times, critic A. H. Weiler called the film "a highly ineffectual little item" and wrote: "'We're no good,.' Mr. Duff realistically admits to Miss Gray at one point, a sentiment that seems to be a pretty fair approximation of the whole business."

== See also ==
- List of American films of 1952
