= Glendale High School (Glendale, California) =

Glendale High School (GHS)
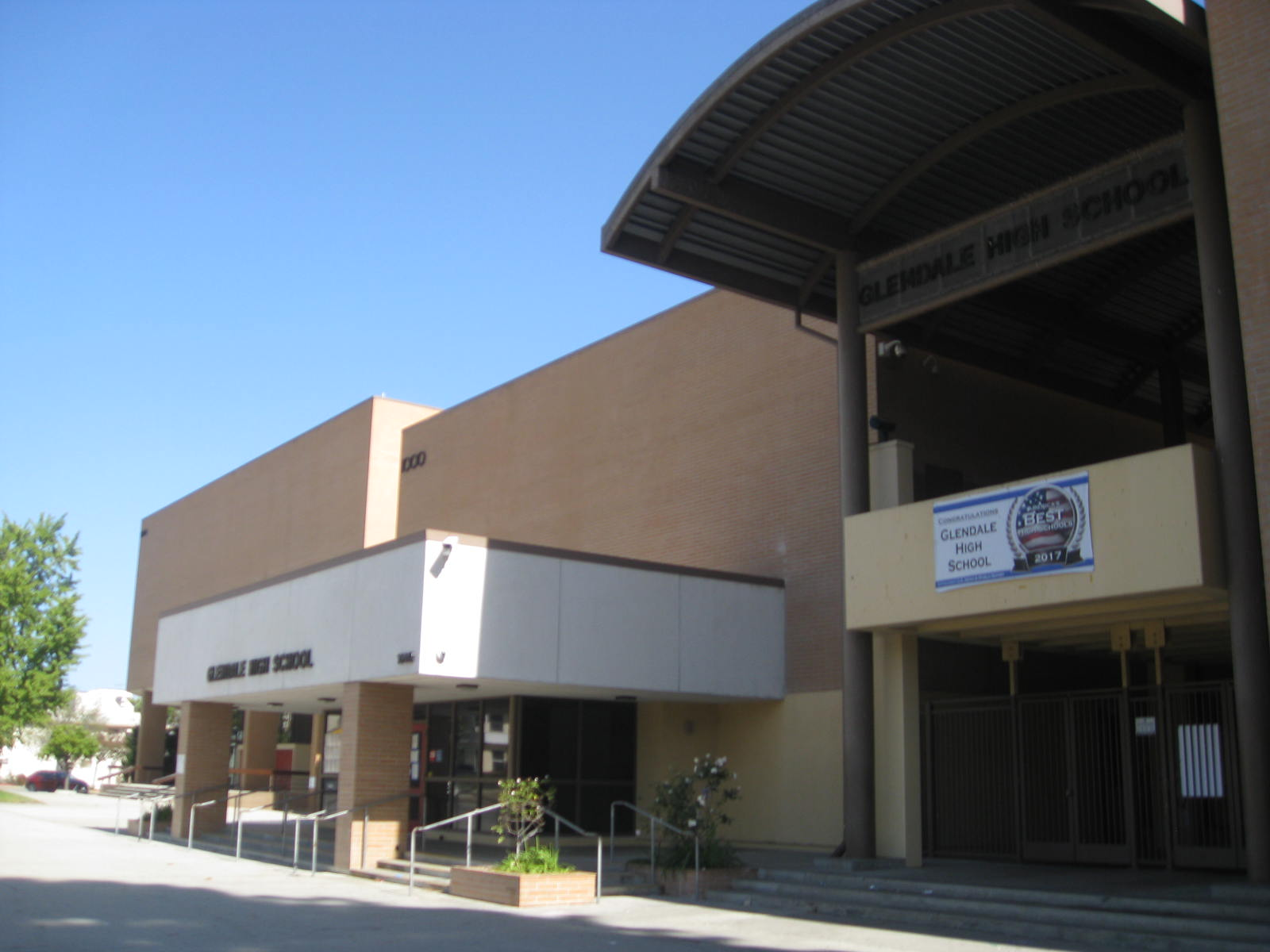

Location
- 1440 E Broadway; Glendale, California; United States; 34.14589°N 118.23292°W

Information
- Type: Public
- Established: September 1901
- School district: Glendale Unified School District
- Principal: Lynette Ohanian
- Teaching staff: 96.06 (FTE)
- Grades: 9–12
- Enrollment: 2,006 (2023-2024)
- Student to teacher ratio: 20.88
- Campus: Suburban
- Colors: Red and Black
- Athletics conference: CIF Southern Section Pacific League
- Mascot: Dynamiters/Nitros
- Rival: Herbert Hoover High School (Glendale)
- Yearbook: The Stylus
- Website: glendalehs.gusd.net
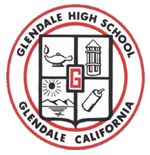

Glendale High School is a high school in Glendale, California, United States. The school is part of the Glendale Unified School District.

== History ==
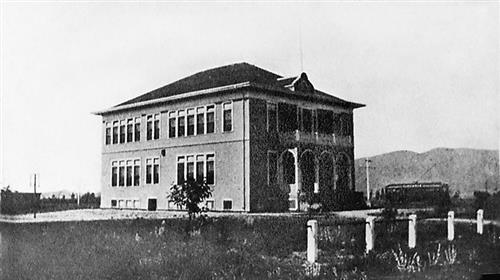
Glendale Union High School in 1902, known then as the "Cheesebox" because of its distinctive yellow color.

Glendale High School was founded as Glendale Union High School in 1901 by the residents of the villages of Glendale, La Crescenta, Burbank, Eagle Rock, Ivanhoe, Tropico and West Glendale.

The first classes were held at the Glendale Hotel. The first principal was Mr. Llewellyn Evans and the school had two teachers and 29 students. The next year, a new school building was built at the corner of what is today Brand Boulevard and Broadway.

George Moyse was appointed principal and continued in his role for 35 years until 1937. The school continued to grow rapidly, and the school moved several times, in 1907 to Harvard Street and in 1914 to Maryland Street.

The school continued to grow, as enrollment reached 800 in 1920 and 1,050 in 1921. During the 20's Women Right's activist Ella Lillian Wall Van Leer would help create and manage various Art and Architecture departments. It was decided then to move the Grade 10, 11 and 12 classes to a new campus at the corner of the present-day Broadway and Verdugo Road (Grade 9 students remained at the Maryland Street campus, and were later integrated into area Middle Schools). The school has remained in this location (1440 East Broadway, at the southeast corner of Verdugo) since 1924.

The Class of 1960 was Glendale's largest, with 903 graduates. Crescenta Valley High School opened in September 1960, taking a sizable portion of Glendale's students.

The school suffered extensive damage during spring break on March 22, 1964, when a student who was concerned about his grades set fire to the room in which he thought the grade information was stored. The fire quickly spread throughout the administration building and to adjacent buildings on the campus. The decision was made to reconstruct the campus, leaving the swimming pool, baseball field, tennis courts, and football stadium as the only remnants of the old campus.

In the early 1990s, the decision was made by the School Board to reintegrate ninth graders into the Glendale Unified School District high schools (with the exception of Crescenta Valley High School, which had already transitioned to a four-year high school in September 1983). As a result, the 'J' building was constructed in 1994–1995, opening in September 1995.

In 2001, Glendale High School celebrated its centenary. The student population was then 3,500 and there were over 100 teachers.

In 2001, the Glendale High School Visual and Performing Arts Program (VAPA) was awarded the BRAVO Award for excellence in arts education by the Los Angeles County Music Center. In 2003, the program won another award, the Creative Ticket National School of Distinction Award from the Kennedy Center in Washington, D.C. Glendale High School was the only public high school to be awarded this honor.

On July 1, 2005, Katherine Fundukian replaced LeRoy Sherman and Lou Stewart as co-principals, as part of a School District decision to move Glendale High School back to a "traditional" one-principal system from the two-principal system that had been in place.

In 2006, eight students from Glendale High School represented the United States at the Junior G8 summit in Saint Petersburg, Russia where they discussed world issues and met with the leaders of the G8 nations.

Glendale High's mathematics department received the highest average AP scores in the United States in 2012.

== Dance/Drill Team ==
Since 1999, the dance/drill team program has won over 50 National Championship titles. The Glendale High School Junior Varsity and Varsity dance/drill team competes annually at the United Spirit Association Nationals competition and starting in the 2018 Season now competes annually at the West Coast Elite Dance Nationals competition. This is held at the Anaheim Convention Center and Long Beach Convention Center, respectively. The Glendale High School dance/drill team consists of more than 80 dancers with ten coaches and a director.

List of USA National Championship titles since 1999:

1999: Co-Ed Dance
2000: Co-Ed Dance, Large All Male
2001: Co-Ed Dance, Small All Male, Large All Male, Championship Small Military
2002: Co-Ed Dance, Large All Male, Championship Small Military, Open Small Lyrical
2003: Co-Ed Dance, Large All Male, Open Medium Military
2004: Co-Ed Dance, Championship Small Military
2005: Co-Ed Dance, Pom, Championship Small Military
2006: Co-Ed Dance, Large All Male
2007: Co-Ed Dance, Large All Male, Championship Large Military, Open Large Military
2008: Co-Ed Dance, Championship Small Military, Open Medium Military
2009: Co-Ed Dance, Championship Small Military, Open Large Military, Championship Large Hip-Hop
2010: Open Small Military
2011: Co-Ed Dance, Championship Small Military, Championship Large Military, Open Large Military
2012: Co-Ed Dance, Championship Small Military, Championship Large Military, Open Small Military, Open Large Military
2013: Co-Ed Dance, Championship Large Military, Championship Large Hip-Hop
2014: Co-Ed Dance, Large All Male, Championship Small Military, Championship Large Military, Large Dance/Drill, Open Small Military
2015: Co-Ed Dance, Large Dance/Drill, Championship Small Military
2016: Co-Ed Dance, Large Dance/Drill, Small Dance/Drill
2017: Co-Ed Dance, Large Dance/Drill, Small Dance/Drill
2018: Co-Ed Dance, Large Dance/Drill, Small Dance/Drill
2019: Co-Ed Dance, Large Dance/Drill, Small Dance/Drill, Championship Small Military
2023: Co-Ed Dance

USA Nationals Drill Down Wins: 2001, 2010, 2012, 2014, 2016

Number of Co-Ed Dance National Championships: 18 - 1999–2009, 2011–2018

List of WCE National Championship titles since 2018:

2018: Co-Ed Dance*, Large Hip-Hop, JV Large Dance/Drill (*This routine also received the "Best Showmanship" award out of the entire Nationals competition)
2019: Co-Ed Dance**, Small Dance/Drill, Large Military (**This routine also received the "Judges Choice" award)
2022: Co-Ed Dance, Small Dance/Drill, X-Small Dance
2023: Co-Ed Dance, Small Dance/Drill, Large Contemporary

== Sport ==
Glendale High School was among the first schools in Southern California to offer athletic sports, and the school's sport program continues to be a major source of pride. Its two mascots are the Dynamiters for the American football program and the Nitros for all other sports.

The large weights and sizes of the players in the 1924-1925 American football team, with all 11 starting players weighing 170 pounds or more, and with almost all of them six or more feet tall, made them, in the words of the authors of Duke: The Life and Times of John Wayne, "a high school phenomenon." That team was directed by coach Normal C. Hayhurst, with University of Southern California student Vic Francy serving as one of the assistants. During that year, the first team to score against them did so in one of the postseason semifinal games.

=== Fall season (September–November) ===
- American football
- Girls' volleyball
- Cross country
- Girls' tennis
- Boys water polo

=== Winter season (December–February) ===
- Girls' water polo
- Boys' basketball
- Girls' basketball
- Boys' soccer
- Girls' soccer

=== Spring season (March–May) ===
- Golf
- Baseball
- Softball
- Boys' track and field
- Girls' track and field
- Boys' swimming
- Girls' swimming
- Boys' tennis
- Boys' volleyball
- Boys' lacrosse
- Girls' lacrosse

== Traditions ==
=== Oratorical ===
Every March, the school holds its annual "Oratorical" event. Students from each class (Grades 9, 10, 11, and 12) are judged on:

- Discipline
- Spirit
- Tableau
- Speech

The tradition was started in 1910, at a time of heightened interest in public speaking in Southern California. It has continued through the years, demonstrating to the community the pride that students have in the school. The event is judged by a combination of alumni, community members and members of the military. As of 2023, only five classes have ever won all four categories, the classes of 1999, 2010, 2012, 2014, and 2023.

=== Newspaper and yearbook ===
The school newspaper, the Explosion, was first published in 1917 and has continued to be published semi-quarterly.

The school yearbook, the Stylus, was started in 1909 as a monthly publication. In 1910, it became a quarterly publication, being published each quarter by a different grade level. Later, it became an annual publication.

=== Pat Navolanic Memorial Award ===
The Pat Navolanic Memorial Award was established in 1966 in honor of Patrick Navolanic, student body president and Valedictorian of the Class of 1963, who is remembered for being extremely active in school activities, and who died of asphyxiation in December 1965 while studying abroad in France. The award is given to the graduating senior who best exemplifies Navolanic's leadership traits, scholarship skills and athletic prowess, as decided by a council of electors representing all student organizations and sports teams on campus. The winner receives a scholarship in the amount of $2,500 and finalists receive $300. The scholarship money is made possible by a financial endowment, as well as generous donations from students, teachers, alumni and the community.

== Demographics ==
GHS is noted for its diversity. Hispanic/Latino students comprise 33.6% of the student population. Additionally, total minority enrollment is 47%, and 61% of students are economically disadvantaged.

Statistics based on 2022-2023 enrollment

Students by grade

- Grade 9 – 447
- Grade 10 – 525
- Grade 11 – 493
- Grade 12 – 513

Sex

- Female – 949 (48%)
- Male – 1,029 (52%)

Ethnicity

- American Indian/Alaskan Native – 20 (1%)
- Asian – 68 (3.4%)
- Pacific Islander – 2 (0.1%)
- Filipino – 154 (7.8%)
- Hispanic/Latino – 665 (33.6%)
- African-American – 56 (1.8%)
- White – 1,038 (52.5%)
- Two or More Races – 30 (1.5%)

== Notable alumni ==
- Frankie Albert – 3-time All-American quarterback at Stanford, member College Football Hall of Fame
- Wilma Baker – Disney animator from 1930s to 1990s
- Leslie Banning - actress
- Kimberly Beck - actress
- Duane Bickett – CIF Player of the Year in basketball; all-American linebacker at USC, 12 seasons in NFL
- Mike Black - NFL punter
- Alyce Canfield - journalist
- Mary Costa – actress
- Gary Sutherland - former Major League Baseball player
- Vic Dana – top 40 singer and popular vocalist of the 1960s
- Michael Davis - NFL defensive back
- Emilio Delgado – actor, Luis from Sesame Street
- Marian Cleeves Diamond - Professor Emeritus of Anatomy and Neuroanatomy at University of California, Berkeley, one of the founders of modern neuroscience
- Bob Dillinger – .306 career batting average in MLB; led American League 1948 in hits with 207
- Yvonne Lime Fedderson (class of 1953) - actress, philanthropist
- Afshin Ghotbi – Former manager of the Iran national football team
- Leland H. Hartwell - co-recipient of the 2001 Nobel Prize in Physiology or Medicine
- Babe Herman – 13-year Major League Baseball career, .324 lifetime batting average
- Donald Leslie – inventor of the Leslie speaker
- Gene Mako – tennis player, 1937 and 1938 Wimbledon doubles champion
- Daron Malakian – guitarist, vocalist System of a Down and Scars on Broadway
- Terry Moore - Academy Award-nominated actress and secret wife of Howard Hughes
- Bob Reinhard – AAFC and NFL player, played college football at Cal
- Ted Schroeder – 1949 Wimbledon singles tennis champion
- Bob Siebenberg – drummer in Supertramp
- Guinn Smith - 1948 Olympic gold medalist in pole vault
- Dwight Stones – 3-time Olympic high jumper (1972, 1976, 1984), 10-time world record holder (2.34 m best)
- Madeleine Stowe – actress, star of films and TV series Revenge
- Gloria Talbott – actress
- John Wayne – Academy Award-winning actor and director
- Loyce Whiteman - big band singer
- Bob Wian – founder of the Bob's Big Boy chain of restaurants
- Ralph Winter – film producer (X-Men trilogy, Fantastic Four 1 & 2)
- Frank Wykoff – world record sprinter, 3-time Olympic gold medalist (1928, 1932, 1936)
