= Brothers in Law (film) =

1957 British film by Roy Boulting

- Directed by: Roy Boulting
- Screenplay by: Roy Boulting; Jeffrey Dell; Frank Harvey Jr.
- Based on: Brothers in Law by Henry Cecil
- Produced by: Roy Boulting
- Starring: Richard Attenborough; Ian Carmichael; Terry-Thomas; Jill Adams; Miles Malleson
- Cinematography: Mutz Greenbaum
- Edited by: Anthony Harvey
- Music by: Benjamin Frankel
- Distributed by: British Lion Films; Tudor
- Release date: 5 March 1957
- Running time: 94 minutes
- Country: United Kingdom
- Language: English

Brothers in Law is a 1957 British comedy film directed by Roy Boulting and starring Richard Attenborough, Ian Carmichael, Terry-Thomas and Jill Adams. It was written by Boulting, Jeffrey Dell and Frank Harvey Jr., adapted from the 1955 novel Brothers in Law by Henry Cecil, a comedy set in the legal profession. The film is one of the Boulting brothers' successful series of institutional satires that began with Private's Progress in 1956.

== Plot summary ==
Roger Thursby has just completed his barrister's examinations and has been called to the bar. He commences his pupillage in the London chambers of Kendall Grimes, but finds he learns more from Henry, his fellow pupil, and Alec, the chambers clerk. Although only supposed to 'shadow' Grimes, he finds himself on his feet before unsympathetic judges almost immediately.

Roger and Henry vie for the affections of Sally, a fellow lodger. She obtains his first brief for him from her father, a solicitor. It is an undefended divorce case, which Roger manages to lose, to the lady's fury. It doesn't help that Judge Ryman is presiding--Roger had been his inept partner in a charity golf match and the judge holds a considerable grudge.

Roger slowly gains more confidence. He is given a 'dock brief', a case of fraud. Despite the odd behaviour of his client, Alfred Green, Roger gets him off. He also becomes the toast of his home town, when he appears in the local assizes court, and wins a case of slander, with his proud parents and their friends in the gallery. It was supposed to be Marshall's case, but he comically misplaces his wig; which he wouldn't be allowed in court without.

Sally marries Charles, a stockbroker friend, but Roger and Henry perk up with the arrival of two attractive girls as fellow lodgers.

== Main cast ==
- Richard Attenborough as Henry Marshall
- Ian Carmichael as Roger Thursby
- Terry-Thomas as Alfred Green
- Jill Adams as Sally Smith
- Miles Malleson as Kendall Grimes
- Raymond Huntley as Tatlock
- Eric Barker as Alec Blair
- Nicholas Parsons as Charles Poole
- Kynaston Reeves as Judge Lawson
- John Le Mesurier as Judge Ryman
- Irene Handl as Mrs. Potter
- Olive Sloane as Mrs. Newent
- Edith Sharpe as Mrs. Thursby
- Leslie Phillips as shopkeeper
- Brian Oulton as client
- George Rose as Mark Frost
- Kenneth Griffith as undertaker
- Basil Dignam as Judge Emery
- Henry Longhurst as Reverend Arthur Thursby
- Maurice Colbourne as Official Referee
- Hugh Moxey as Golf Club Secretary
- Penny Morrell as Rosalie Biddle
- John Schlesinger as Assize Court solicitor

== Critical reception ==
Bosley Crowther in The New York Times compared the film unfavourably to Private's Progress, commenting that it was "blessed with little spark".

The Monthly Film Bulletin wrote: "The cloistered background of judges, barristers and clerks is at once convincing and comic. Script and performances are unusually sophisticated, and the comic invention is sufficient to make the film consistently entertaining. Roy Boulting's direction, though it could be more concise, succeeds in keeping the cast on the right side of caricature. Ian Carmichael, despite a tendency towards theatrical, rather than cinematic, mannerisms in moments of crisis, is generally more restrained than in Private's Progress, and confirms that he is one of the most talented of British light comedians. ... Among the remarkably assured cast, Terry-Thomas, Miles Malleson and Irene Handl give particularly bright performances, and Eric Barker's clerk is self-effacing and shrewdly observed."

Tony Sloman in the Radio Times wrote, "Carmichael is surrounded here by a cast of accomplished character actors, including the splendid Terry-Thomas and the redoubtable Richard Attenborough as a smarmy fellow barrister. This is still very funny and relevant today."

In British Sound Films: The Studio Years 1928–1959 David Quinlan rated the film as "very good", writing: "Funny follow-up to private progress, wittily written and confidently played."

== Box office ==
According to Kinematograph Weekly the film was "in the money" at the British box office in 1957.
