= The Dock Brief (1960 film) =

1960 Australian TV film

- Ad from 'The Age' 17 Feb 1960
- Based on: play The Dock Brief by John Mortimer
- Written by: George F. Kerr
- Directed by: Raymond Menmuir
- Country of origin: Australia
- Original language: English

Production
- Running time: 60 minutes or 50 minutes.
- Production company: ABC

Original release
- Network: ABC
- Release: 27 January 1960 (Sydney)
- Release: 17 February 1960 (Melbourne)

The Dock Brief is a 1960 Australian TV play directed by Ray Menmuir and starring Reg Lye and Moray Powell. It was based on the play by John Mortimer.

== Premise ==
The barrister Morgenall is given a brief to defend a bird seed seller, Fowle, accused of murdering his wife.

== Cast ==
- Reg Lye as Fowle
- Moray Powell as Morgenhall

== Production ==
The play was made in Sydney under the direction of Ray Menmuir. A radio version of the play had been performed in Australia the previous year.

Menmuir said "as first seen the characters are quite comical but as the play progresses we begin to laugh with them rather than at them."

Douglas Smith designed the set which consisted of two areas: the prison cell and the imaginary courtroom. Special effects were used to create a "courtroom of the imagination" for a later scene.

== Reception ==
The Sydney Morning Herald called it "beautifully acted" praising Menmuir's "admirably deft and very imaginative production."
