= The Dock Brief =

1962 British film by James Hill

- Cover of 1999 DVD version
- Directed by: James Hill
- Written by: Pierre Rouve
- Based on: the play The Dock Brief by John Mortimer
- Produced by: Dimitri de Grunwald
- Starring: Peter Sellers; Richard Attenborough; Beryl Reid; David Lodge; Frank Pettingell
- Cinematography: Edward Scaife
- Music by: Ron Grainer
- Production company: Metro-Goldwyn-Mayer British Studio
- Distributed by: Metro-Goldwyn-Mayer (USA/UK)
- Release date: 20 September 1962 (UK)
- Running time: 88 minutes 77 minutes (DVD)
- Country: United Kingdom
- Language: English

The Dock Brief (US title Trial and Error; also known as A Case for the Jury) is a 1962 black-and-white British legal satire directed by James Hill, starring Peter Sellers and Richard Attenborough, and based on the 1957 play The Dock Brief by John Mortimer.

== Plot ==
In a cell under the Old Bailey, two men meet. One is Wilfred Morgenhall, a single barrister who never gets any cases and is overjoyed to have won this dock brief, the defence of an accused individual with no lawyer (at public expense). The other is his client Herbert Fowle, an insignificant man who just wants to plead guilty to murdering his wife and get it all over.

Flashbacks show that the wife was impossible to live with and Fowle, who avoided her as much as possible, hatched a plot to get rid of her by taking in a male lodger. The lodger found her amusing and attractive, until one day he went too far and Mrs Fowle threw him out of the house. In despair at his plot having failed, Fowle killed her.

Morgenhall role-plays various defences, in the process raising Fowle's will to fight. But when the case is called, he botches it and Fowle is found guilty. Morgenhall goes to visit him in prison, where he learns that Fowle has been reprieved because his defence was so poor. The two leave together, two lonely and inadequate men who have become friends.

== Cast ==
- Peter Sellers as Wilfred Morgenhall, Barrister
- Richard Attenborough as Herbert Fowle, The Accused Murderer
- Beryl Reid as Doris Fowle, His Late Wife
- David Lodge as Frank Bateson, The Lodger
- Frank Pettingell as Tuppy Morgan, Solicitor
- Audrey Nicholson as Morgenhall's Girl In Flashback
- Tristram Jellinek as Mr. Perkins, The Prosecutor
- Eric Woodburn as Judge Banter
- John Waite as Clerk of The Court
- Patrick Newell as 1st Warder
- Henry Kay as 2nd Warder
- Frank Thornton as Photographer At The Fowle Wedding
- Eric Dodson as Examiner

== Production ==
Pierre Rouve wrote the script. He opened up the play for cinema by using flashbacks.

Filming took place in March and April 1962 at Shepperton Studios in London. John Mortimer said that Peter Sellers wanted to play the role in a north county accent and the director James Hill had to coax him back "to what I felt were undoubtedly... southern origins" of his character.

== Release ==
The film had its world premiere on 20 September 1962 at the Plaza Theatre in London's West End.

== Reception ==
=== Box office ===
According to MGM records, the film made a profit of $141,000.

=== Critical ===
The Monthly Film Bulletin wrote: "In its original form as a television play, John Mortimer's little legal joke was something of a minor masterpiece. ... Pierre Rouve's adaptation has broadened and coarsened the original fabric and stretched it to take in flashback scenes which deaden by their explicitness where Mortimer was content to imply. James Hill's flat and literal style does nothing to offset the lack of imagination which is also apparent in Peter Sellers' performance as Morgenhall. He gives a brilliantly superficial sketch of a legal type, complete with resonant courtroom voice. But he is altogether too smooth and glib for the seedy and defeated dreamer who fails his last chance so ludicrously. Admittedly the balance between humour and compassion is difficult to strike, and Sellers is very funny; but his is a caricature rather than a characterisation. Richard Attenborough makes a close shot at the dim little murderer, but his performance is not altogether free of a suspicion of patronage, and he is handicapped by a grotesque make-up. In spite of its shortcomings, The Dock Brief remains a refreshingly original line in British comedy, and the quality of the dialogue shines like a good deed in a naughty world."

The Guardian called it "excellent".

The New York Times called it "a good second hand excursion into the realm of character comedy."

Leslie Halliwell wrote: "Flat filming of a TV play which was a minor milestone; the film is twice the length and half as funny, and both stars quickly become tiresome."

== Accolades ==
Richard Attenborough was nominated for the 1963 BAFTA Award for best British Actor for his role.

== Quotes ==
Morgenhall: "Now you're the only case I've got, and the most difficult."
