= Corridors of Blood =

1958 film by Robert Day

- Theatrical release poster
- Directed by: Robert Day
- Written by: Jean Scott Rogers
- Produced by: John Croydon; Charles F. Vetter
- Starring: Boris Karloff; Christopher Lee; Betta St. John; Finlay Currie; Francis Matthews
- Cinematography: Geoffrey Faithfull
- Edited by: Peter Mayhew
- Music by: Buxton Orr
- Production company: Amalgamated Productions
- Distributed by: Metro-Goldwyn-Mayer
- Release dates: December 1958; (U.K.); 1962 (U.S. release)
- Running time: 86 min.
- Countries: United Kingdom; United States
- Language: English
- Budget: £90,000 or £200,000

Corridors of Blood (aka Doctor from Seven Dials) is a 1958 period drama film directed by Robert Day and starring Boris Karloff and Christopher Lee. It was written by Jean Scott Rogers. The original music score was composed by Buxton Orr.

The film was marketed with the tagline "Tops in Terror!" in the US where MGM only released it in 1962 as a double feature with the Italian film Werewolf in a Girls' Dormitory (1961).

== Plot ==
An 1840s British surgeon, Dr. Thomas Bolton, experiments with anesthetic gases in an effort to make surgery pain-free. While doing so, his demonstration before a panel of his peers ends in a horrific mishap with his patient awakening under the knife; he is forced to leave his position in disgrace. To complicate matters, he becomes addicted to the gases and gets involved with a gang of criminals, led by Black Ben and his henchman Resurrection Joe. Unfortunately, this shady partnership leads Bolton to further ruin, culminating in his unwitting participation in murder, for which he becomes the first victim of a blackmail scheme.

The key ingredient in Bolton's experiments is opium, which one evening causes him to wander into The Seven Dials tavern in a haze and leave his scientific notebook behind. When he finally realizes where it is, Black Ben blackmails him into signing false death certificates for its return.

When Bolton is suspended from duty, his supply of chemicals is cut off. Bolton and Resurrection Joe burgle the hospital supply room one night, but Joe senselessly murders the night watchman in the process. Bolton loses himself in his inhalations to "forget" this.

Inspector Donovan, suspicious of the forged death certificates, leads a massive police raid on the tavern. The corpulent Black Ben falls to his death while attempting to climb to the roof. Joe stabs Bolton to death, but not before Bolton throws acid in his face.

Several years later Bolton's son Jonathan succeeds in completing his father's experiments with the approval of the medical community.

== Cast ==
- Boris Karloff as Dr. Thomas Bolton
- Betta St. John as Susan
- Finlay Currie as Supt. Matheson
- Christopher Lee as Resurrection Joe
- Francis Matthews as Jonathan Bolton
- Francis de Wolff as Black Ben
- Adrienne Corri as Rachel
- Basil Dignam as Chairman
- Frank Pettingell as Mr. Blount
- Nigel Green as Inspector Donovan
- Yvonne Romain as Rosa
- Howard Lang as Chief Inspector
- Frank Sieman as murdered night watchman
- Josephine Bailey as little girl with bad foot (uncredited)
- Stratford Johns as berserk patient with bad arm
- Skip Martin as dwarf in tavern (uncredited)

== Production ==
After the success of The Haunted Strangler (1958), producer Richard Gordon looked at making a follow-up with Boris Karloff. At one stage a colour remake of Dracula was discussed, as was an adaptation of Edgar Allan Poe'sThe Facts in the Case of M. Valdemar. Eventually producer John Scott discovered a screenplay by Jean Scott Rogers based on the early days of anesthesia, originally called Doctor from Seven Dials.

Executive producer Richard Gordon and interviewer Tom Weaver talk about the making of Corridors of Blood on the audio commentary of the Criterion DVD, available as part of the 2007 set Monsters and Madmen.

== Release ==
The movie was made in 1958 but, because of upheavals at MGM at the time, was not released until 1962.

== Reception ==
=== Box office ===
According to MGM records, the film made a profit of $14,000. It was considered a commercial disappointment and was the last film from Amalgamated Productions.

=== Critical ===
The Monthly Film Bulletin wrote: "A companion piece to that sadly under-rated horror film Grip of the Strangler (1958), also directed by Robert Day and starring Boris Karloff, Corridors of Blood is a far worthier little piece than its title suggests. Played with dedicated energy by Karloff, Bolton's self-destruction in the cause of humanity takes on a genuinely tragic fervour, so that the affirmative last scene, instead of seeming glib (which of course it is), gives point to the tactfully stressed horrors of the previous hospital scenes. Robert Day's direction, considering the cheapness of the production, is resourceful and atmospheric, with nice use of chiaroscuro; the acting is generally above average. The film's main weakness is its story line, which is repetitive and constricted and too often seems to be marking time."

In British Sound Films: The Studio Years 1928–1959 David Quinlan rated the film as "good", writing: "Nicely atmospheric thriller."

Leonard Maltin awarded the film two and a half out of a possible four stars.

== See also ==
- The Haunted Strangler
- First Man into Space
- The Atomic Submarine
