= Dorothy Alison =

Australian actress (1925–1992)

- Born: 4 April 1925; Broken Hill, Australia
- Died: 17 January 1992 (aged 66); London, England
- Occupation: Actress
- Years active: 1949–1989
- Awards: Logie Award for Best Supporting Actress in a telemovie or miniseries (1982)

Dorothy Alison (4 April 1925 – 17 January 1992) was an Australian stage, film and television actress.

== Biography ==
Dorothy Alison was born in the New South Wales mining city of Broken Hill and educated at Sydney Girls High School. She moved to London in 1949 to further her career. Aside from her numerous, mostly supporting film roles, she appeared in several television programmes and mini-series, including a prominent role in A Town Like Alice, The Adventures of Robin Hood as the Duchess Constance and other TV shows.

She was nominated for two BAFTA awards: Most Promising Newcomer for Mandy (1952) and Best British Actress for Reach for the Sky (1956). For her performance in A Town Like Alice, she won the 1982 Logie Award (Australian television) for Best Supporting Actress in a Miniseries or Telemovie. She died at the age of 66 in London in 1992.

== Partial filmography ==
- Eureka Stockade (1949) - Mrs. Bentley
- Sons of Matthew (1949) - Rose O'Riordan
- Mandy (1952) - Miss Stockton
- Turn the Key Softly (1953) - Joan
- The Maggie (1954) - Miss Peters
- The Purple Plain (1954) - Nurse (uncredited)
- Child's Play (1954) - Margery Chappell
- Companions in Crime (1954) - Sheila Marsden
- The Feminine Touch (1956) - The Suicide
- The Long Arm (1956) - Mary Halliday
- Reach for the Sky (1956) - Nurse Brace
- The Silken Affair (1956) - Mrs. Tweakham
- Interpol (1957) - Helen
- The Scamp (1957) - Barbara Leigh
- The Man Upstairs (1958) - Mrs. Barnes
- Life in Emergency Ward 10 (1959) - Sister Jane Fraser
- The Nun's Story (1959) - Sister Aurelie (martyred nurse, Africa)
- Two Living, One Dead (1961) - Esther Kester
- Georgy Girl (1966) - Health Visitor
- Pretty Polly (1967) - Mrs. Barlow
- Journey into Darkness (1968) - Mrs. Latham (episode 'Paper Dolls')
- See No Evil, also known as Blind Terror (1971) - Betty Rexton
- Dr. Jekyll and Sister Hyde (1971) - Mrs. Spencer
- The Amazing Mr. Blunden (1972) - Mrs. Allen
- Baxter! (1973) - Nurse Kennedy
- The Return of the Soldier (1982) - Brigadier's Wife
- The Winds of Jarrah (1983) - Mrs. Sullivan
- The Schippan Mystery (1984) - Mrs. Schippan
- Invitation to the Wedding (1985) - 1st Woman
- A Fortunate Life (1986) - Mrs. Carr
- Rikky and Pete (1988) - Mrs. Menzies
- Evil Angels, also known as A Cry in the Dark (1988) - Avis Murchison
- Two Brothers Running (1988) - Mrs Widmore
- Australia (1989) - Doreen Swanson
- Malpractice (1989) - Maureen Davis
