= Otto Langmann =

German pastor and diplomat

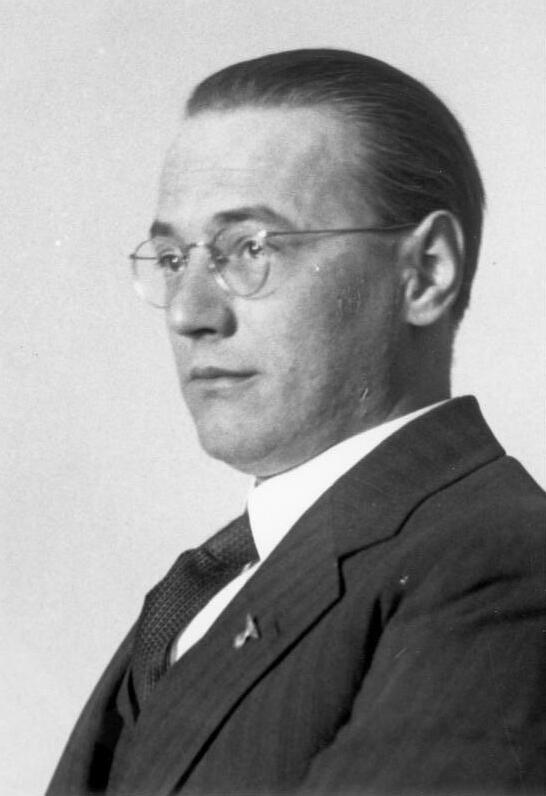
Otto Langmann

Otto Langmann (1898-1956) was a German pastor and diplomat.

== Biography ==
In November 1923 he married Ilse Siefert, with whom he had four children. He was appointed parish priest in Mecklenburg. In 1928 he went to Colombia and Ecuador. In 1930, in Guatemala, he supported a local evangelical community; a year later he joined the NSDAP and founded the first Nazi group abroad.

Langmann served as the representative of German government in Montevideo, Uruguay (1937-1942) during the Battle of the River Plate in 1939. During this time, he supported the plotters in a failed Nazi coup, as part of a planned takeover of Uruguay. Langmann held his position until the Uruguayan government broke off relations with Germany in 1942. Langmann then returned to Germany, working at the Foreign Office in Berlin.

During the Battle of Berlin, Langmann fought as a member of the Volkssturm. He was later taken prisoner by the Soviets. He spent ten years in prison camps in Siberia. In 1955, Langmann was released and returned to Germany where he died of cancer shortly after.

== In fiction ==
- In the 1956 film The Battle of the River Plate, directed by Powell and Pressburger, Langmann was portrayed by John Chandos.

== Publications ==
- Deutsche Christenheit in der Zeitenwende. Hamburg, Agentur des Rauen Hauses 1933. 77 pages
