= James Forrest (actor) =

Australian actor

James Forrest is an Australian actor who worked in Hollywood. He was a journalist before going into acting, his first film role being Australian film Dust in the Sun in 1958.

== Select credits ==
- Dust in the Sun (1958)
- Sea Hunt (1961) – Season 4, Episode 27
- Combat! - Season 2, Episode 26, What Are the Bugles Blowin' For? (1964)
- Perry Mason (TV series): Season 5, Episode 6, The Case of the Meddling Medium (1961); Season 6, Episode 6, The Case of the Dodging Domino (1962); Season 7, Episode 8, The Case of the Floating Stones (1963).
- Nightmare in Wax (1969)
- McHale's Navy--Season 1, Episode 26, as Lieutenant Crandall
- McHale's Navy--Season 3, Episode 2, as Lieutenant Crowder
