= The Scamp =

1957 British film by Wolf Rilla

- Original British quad poster
- Directed by: Wolf Rilla
- Written by: Wolf Rilla
- Based on: play Uncertain Joy by Charlotte Hastings
- Produced by: James Lawrie
- Starring: Richard Attenborough; Terence Morgan; Colin Petersen; Dorothy Alison; Jill Adams
- Cinematography: Freddie Francis
- Edited by: Bernard Gribble
- Music by: Francis Chagrin
- Production company: A James Lawrie Production
- Distributed by: Renown Pictures Corporation (UK)
- Release dates: 7 October 1957 (London, England)
- Running time: 87 mins
- Country: United Kingdom
- Language: English

The Scamp is a 1957 British drama film directed by Wolf Rilla and starring Richard Attenborough, Terence Morgan, Colin Petersen and Dorothy Alison. It was based on the play Uncertain Joy by Charlotte Hastings. It was released in the U.S. as Strange Affection.

== Synopsis ==
A schoolteacher and his wife take in the tempestuous child of an abusive drifter. When the father returns, their lives become complicated by issues of corporal punishment, physical abuse, strained relations and various crimes.

== Cast ==
- Richard Attenborough as Stephen Leigh
- Dorothy Alison as Barbara Leigh
- Colin Petersen as Tod Dawson
- Terence Morgan as Mike Dawson
- Jill Adams as Julie Dawson
- Maureen Delany as Mrs. Perryman
- Margaretta Scott as Mrs. Blundell
- David Franks as Eddie
- Geoffrey Keen as headmaster
- Charles Lloyd-Pack as Beamish
- June Cunningham as Annette
- Sam Kydd as shopkeeper
- Victor Brooks as Inspector Birch

== Production ==
The film was based on the play Uncertain Joy by Charlotte Hastings which premiered in 1953 starring Jean Kent.

The film was produced by James Lawrie, former head of the NFFC. The role of the boy was offered to Colin Petersen the Australian star of Smiley (1956).

== Critical reception ==
Variety called it "run of the mill".

The Radio Times Guide to Films gave the film 2/5 stars, writing: "Having made his name in the Australian-set drama Smiley [1956], contemporary critics had high hopes for ten-year-old Colin Petersen. He tries hard in this well intentioned story of a delinquent given a second chance, but he never convinces either as the urchin son of alcoholic music-hall actor Terence Morgan or as the confused kid cajoled by teacher Richard Attenborough and his wife Dorothy Alison. Attenborough overdoes the bourgeois benevolence."

TV Guide wrote, "Shaky direction and a cliche-ridden script mar any possibilities for this human interest story"; whereas Leonard Maltin called it a "Decent British drama."

Kine Weekly called it "a smoothly balanced job".

Filmink wrote the film " isn’t as good as Smiley – it’s not as fun, and Attenborough’s character has this weird vibe that isn’t really explored – but there are good moments and Petersen is marvellous once again: energetic, cheeky, natural. Director Wolf Rilla was smart enough to let the actor use his Australian accent and he devised several scenes where Petersen shows off his real-life drumming skills."

== Box office ==
According to Kinematograph Weekly the film was "in the money" at the British box office in 1957 and Renown "ran into the big money" with a shrewd double bill" of The Scamp and Our Girl Friday (1953).
