= Death Over My Shoulder =

1958 British film by Arthur Crabtree

- Yugoslavian theatrical release poster
- Directed by: Arthur Crabtree
- Written by: Norman Hudis; Alyce Canfield
- Produced by: Frank Bevis
- Starring: Keefe Brasselle; Jill Adams
- Cinematography: Walter J. Harvey
- Music by: Douglas Gamley
- Production company: Vicar
- Distributed by: Orb Films
- Release date: 1958
- Running time: 89 minutes
- Country: UK
- Language: English

Death Over My Shoulder is a 1958 British 'B' crime film directed by Arthur Crabtree and starring Keefe Brasselle, Bonar Colleano and Jill Adams. It was written by Norman Hudis based on a story by Alyce Canfield.

== Plot ==
When Jack Regan is unable to meet his payments for his ill son, he hires a professional killer to murder him so his son will receive Jack's insurance money.

== Cast ==
- Keefe Brasselle as Jack Regan
- Bonar Colleano as Joe Longo
- Jill Adams as Evelyn Connors
- Arlene DeMarco as Julie
- Charles Farrell as Shiv Maitland
- Al Mulock as Brainy Peterson
- Sonia Dresdel as Miss Upton
- John Moulder-Brown

== Critical reception ==
The Monthly Film Bulletin wrote: "Although the introduction of American gangsters into London is, presumably, feasible, it is not in this case very convincing; and in this basic weakness most of the faults of the film originate. Violence, sentimentality and lust are dispensed in more or less equal quantities, but are never more than tedious. Bonar Colleano and Al Mulock manage orthodox, competent performances."

Kine Weekly wrote: "The picture sprawls during the first 30 minutes, but plenty of widely varied action, embroidered with sex, is crowded into the last hour. Keefe Brasselle contributes a forthright, yet sensitive, portrayal as Regan, Bonar Colleano is in his element as Longo, and Jill Adams has her moments as Evelyn, but Arlene de Marco, who, by the way, should never sing in public, falters as Julie. lts supporting players are adequate. The staging is above average, and the night shots are impressive."

In British Sound Films: The Studio Years 1928–1959 David Quinlan rated the film as "mediocre", writing: "Tired and tedious; seems very long."
