= Southern International Productions =

Australian film production company

Southern International Productions was an Australian film production company established in the 1950s by Lee Robinson and Chips Rafferty.

It was established after the success of The Phantom Stockman from Playtpus Productions with Rafferty, Robinson and George Heath. Heath left the company and they set up Southern International. Its first film was King of the Coral Sea.

For a few years it was the most prolific film production company in Australia, pioneering international co-productions with France, but a series of box office failures starting with Dust in the Sun caused it to be liquidated.

Rafferty left producing but Lee Robinson later formed another company, Fauna, with actor John McCallum.

Robinson and Rafferty later formed another company, Australian Television Enterprises, to make films for TV. This was valued at £250,000.

== Credits ==
- King of the Coral Sea (1954)
- Walk into Paradise (1956)
- Dust in the Sun (1958)
- The Stowaway (1958)
- The Restless and the Damned (1959)
- Rock 'n' Roll (1959)
