= One Way Out (film) =

1955 British film by Francis Searle

- British quad poster
- Directed by: Francis Searle
- Written by: Jonathan Roche
- Based on: a story by Jean Scott Rogers and John Temple-Smith
- Produced by: Francis Edge; John Temple-Smith
- Starring: Jill Adams; Eddie Byrne; Lyndon Brook
- Cinematography: Walter J. Harvey
- Edited by: Maurice Rootes
- Production company: Major Pictures
- Distributed by: J. Arthur Rank Film Distributors (UK)
- Release date: September 1955
- Running time: 61 minutes
- Country: United Kingdom
- Language: English

One Way Out is a 1955 British crime drama film directed by Francis Searle and starring Jill Adams, Eddie Byrne, Lyndon Brook, John Chandos and Arthur Lowe. The screenplay was by Jonathan Roche from a story by John Temple-Smith and Jean Scott Rogers. The art direction was by William Kellner. This second feature was released in the UK as the supporting film to the Norman Wisdom comedy Man of the Moment (1955).

== Plot ==
Superintendent Harcourt is on the verge of retiring from the police force and in his final case, seeks to put away Danvers, a ruthless fence. Danvers however, tries to buy off Harcourt, and when this fails, attempts to implicate the Superintendent's daughter Shirley in a store robbery. Danvers uses another crook, Leslie Parrish, to blackmail Harcourt to drop the case against him. When the Superintendent retires, he decides to pursue Danvers as a civilian.

== Cast ==
- Jill Adams as Shirley Harcourt
- Eddie Byrne as Superintendent Harcourt
- Lyndon Brook as Leslie Parrish
- John Chandos as Danvers
- John Bushelle as Assistant Commissioner
- Olive Milbourne as Mrs. Harcourt
- Arthur Howard as Marriott
- Arthur Lowe as Sam
- Ryck Ryden as Harry
- Anne Valery as Carol Martin
- Doris Gilmore as Mrs. Danvers
- Nicholas Tanner as garage attendant
- Nicholas Temple-Smith as the baby
- Sam Kydd as gang member
- Victor Platt as Joe, snack bar assistant (uncredited)

== Critical reception ==
The Monthly Film Bulletin wrote: "Average crime novelette, with a capable performance by Eddie Byrne as the harassed Superintendent Harcourt. Photography and direction are fair, and the action, although scarcely very plausible, develops a moderate degree of tension."

Kine Weekly wrote: "The picture meanders and fails to put heart interest or punch into the fantastic duty or parental love problem thrust on the ageing cop. Jill Adams, although no Sarah Bernhardt, is nice to look at as Shirley, but Eddie Byrne, Lyndon Brook and John Chandos are little more than amateurish as Harcourt, Leslie and Danvers. The direction, too, lacks inspiration, and the staging is anything but lush. And oh! what dialogue!"

Britmovie called it an "unassuming British B-thriller directed by Francis Searle and starring Irish actor Eddie Byrne...and like many similar b-movies of the time is marred by weak writing and a plot that is never credible for a moment. The cast put all the effort they can in attempting to make this nonsense communicable to an audience."
