= The Green Man (film) =

1956 British comedy film by Robert Day

- Film poster
- Directed by: Robert Day; Basil Dearden (uncredited)
- Written by: Frank Launder; Sidney Gilliat
- Starring: Alastair Sim; George Cole; Terry-Thomas; Jill Adams
- Cinematography: Gerald Gibbs
- Music by: Cedric Thorpe Davie
- Release date: 1956
- Country: United Kingdom
- Language: English

The Green Man is a 1956 black and white British black comedy film that was directed by Robert Day and starring Alastair Sim, George Cole, Terry-Thomas and Jill Adams. The screenplay was by Frank Launder and Sidney Gilliat, based on the play Meet a Body.

In the film, a professional contract killer and his assistant plan the murder of a prominent businessman. The murder is scheduled to take place during the businessman's stay at a seaside hotel. However a salesman and his new female partner have learned of the murder plans, and they are actively trying to prevent the murder.

== Plot ==
Harry Hawkins is a freelance assassin who is contracted to blow up Sir Gregory Upshott, a prominent and pompous London businessman. By courting Upshott's spinster secretary, Marigold, he learns that his target will be taking one of the firm's typists for a weekend at a seaside hotel called "The Green Man". Hawkins hides a bomb in a radio, which he plans to leave in the hotel lounge. Finding out his treachery, the secretary comes to his house to confront him but is attacked (unseen by the viewer) and left for dead by Hawkins' assistant McKechnie who, as nobody is next door, hides the body there (in a grand piano).

The body is found by a young vacuum cleaner salesman called William Blake who calls there, and he first goes next door and accidentally alerts Hawkins, who has his assistant move the body. He then alerts the house owner Reginald's pretty fiancée, Ann. The two are terrified, and when Reginald returns home he finds them lying on the floor, hiding together under the bed. Reginald's second furious exit creates doubt over the future relationship. William and Ann then face another moment of horror as the "corpse" staggers into the house through the French doors and, before collapsing again, tells them that Upshott will be blown up that night in the Green Man by a bomb at precisely 22:28.

Meanwhile a new group of figures assemble at The Green Man: Upshott arrives with his shy young secretary Joan, but wants a drink before he registers. The waiter tells them they must order food before 10pm because of the Catering Act. Hawkins arrives and sits in the lounge pretending to enjoy a violin concerto played by three mature ladies. The bomb is in a radio in his suitcase. Hawkins takes the three ladies for a drink in the bar just as Upshott and his secretary rise to take their meal.

Not knowing what name Upshott will register under, Ann and William rush there and decide he will be alone and under a false name. They wrongly assume that the name "Boughtflower" is false and track him down. But the time reaches 22:28 and they dive for cover. The trio starts playing in the lounge again. Hawkins encourages them to play faster and join him again in the bar.

Meanwhile Ann and William cannot get the landlord to believe their story, try to evacuate the place and locate the bomb. Hawkins has put the radio on in the lounge. It announces the time as 22:24. William realises the time on the hall clock was wrong. He starts to evacuate the hotel. Meanwhile Upshott sits closer to the radio to hear an article about himself. William has the brainwave that it will be on a timer in the radio, which he therefore throws towards the sea seconds before it explodes. Hawkins crashes into his assistant's car, and both are stopped by the police as they try to drive off.

Driving back to London, Ann and William hear her fiancé Reginald speaking on the radio: he is reading a poem, but breaks off in the middle to deliver into the microphone a vicious and impassioned diatribe about Ann. As Reginald is ushered away from the microphone, they stop driving and share their first kiss.

== Cast ==
- Alastair Sim as Harry Hawkins
- George Cole as William Blake
- Terry-Thomas as Charles Boughtflower, guest at the Green Man
- Jill Adams as Ann Vincent
- Raymond Huntley as Sir Gregory Upshott
- Colin Gordon as Reginald Willoughby-Cruft
- Avril Angers as Marigold
- Dora Bryan as Lily, receptionist and barmaid at the Green Man
- John Chandos as McKechnie
- Cyril Chamberlain as Police Sergeant Bassett
- Eileen Moore as Sir Gregory's weekend companion, Joan Wood
- Richard Wattis as doctor called by Blake
- Vivien Wood as leader of the hotel string trio
- Marie Burke as Felicity, member of hotel string trio
- Lucy Griffiths as Annabel, member of hotel string trio
- Arthur Brough as Landlord
- Arthur Lowe as radio salesman
- Alexander Gauge as Chairman
- Peter Bull as General Niva
- Willoughby Goddard as statesman
- Michael Ripper as waiter at the Green Man
- Terence Alexander as radio announcer
- Leslie Weston as porter

== Production ==
Cole's then-wife, Eileen Moore, appeared in the film as the typist with whom Upshott has a liaison.

Gilliat said the film was "okay".

== Critical reception ==
The Monthly Film Bulletin wrote: "The opening scenes (Hawkins describing his past triumphs as an assassin and the attempted murder of Marigold) strike a lightly macabre note and suggest another essay in "black" comedy. Unfortunately, the story soon reverts to fairly conventional farce, with jokes about the B.B.C., the National Health Service and illicit week-ends in the country. Alastair Sim extracts the maximum amount of ghoulish humour from a sketchily written part, TerryThomas is intermittently amusing in his now familiar act and the direction is brisk. But, in attempting to combine the popular with the more sophisticated, the producers have failed to make the best of either world."

The New York Times noted "Weekend at a horrible little country hotel, same name, and one of the funniest British films ever."

The Radio Times wrote "If you ever doubted that Alastair Sim was the finest British screen comedian of the sound era, then here's the proof of his immense talent. As the assassin with the mournful smile, he gives a performance of rare genius that more than makes amends for the longueurs in Frank Launder and Sidney Gilliat's script."

Allmovie opined "If The Green Man finally falls a little short of being classic, it's only because the mechanics of the plot get a bit wearying at times; otherwise, it's a charmingly subversive little treat."

Time Out called it "A splendid black comedy."

In British Sound Films: The Studio Years 1928–1959 David Quinlan rated the film as "good", writing: "Laughter builds up steadily; Sim irresistable."

Leslie Halliwell said: "Cheerful but not very subtle black comedy suffering from the attempt to make a star part out of a very minor character."

== Home media ==
The film, rated U, has been re-released on Region 2 DVD with School for Scoundrels (1960).

== See also ==
- Green Man
