= The Restless and the Damned =

- French poster
- Directed by: Yves Allégret
- Written by: René Wheeler
- Based on: novel Manganese by François Ponthier
- Produced by: Robert Dorfmann; Lee Robinson
- Starring: Edmond O'Brien; Richard Basehart
- Cinematography: Carl Kayser; Henri Persin; Louis Stein; Giles Bonneau
- Edited by: Albert Jurgenson
- Music by: Henri Crolla; André Hodeir; Ray Ventura
- Production companies: Silverfilm (France); Australian Television Enterprises (Australia)
- Release date: 15 October 1959 (France)
- Running time: 98 minutes
- Countries: France; Italy; Australia
- Languages: French; English
- Budget: £600,000
- Box office: 767,540 admissions (France)

The Restless and the Damned (also known as L'Ambitieuse) is a 1959 French-Italian-Australian drama film co produced by Lee Robinson. It was shot on location in Tahiti and the Tuamotu Islands. There are French and English-language versions.

The film's financial failure marked the end of Robinson's involvement in the film industry in the 1950s. It is also known as The Ambitious One, The Dispossessed and The Climbers.

== Synopsis ==
In Tahiti, an ambitious woman, Dominique, promotes the fortunes of her simple husband, George, by extracting money from George's family to finance his operations and encouraging him to doublecross his boss on phosphate mine in Tahiti. She also seduces George's boss, while George takes over some mine deeds that the boss has allowed to lapse.

George and Dominque become rich. However, when George decides to leave Dominique for another woman, Claire, she tries to kill him.

== Cast ==
- Edmond O'Brien as Buchanan
- Richard Basehart as George Rancourt
- Andrea Parisy as Dominique
- Nicole Berger as Claire
- Nigel Lovell as Andre
- Reg Lye as Mathews
- Jean Marchat as Uncle Albert
- Denise Vernac as Aunt Edwige

== Production ==
=== Development ===
The movie was the last of three co-productions Australians Lee Robinson and Chips Rafferty did with French companies in the late 1950s, after Walk into Paradise and The Stowaway. The films were shot in English and French versions with a combined Australian and French crew. While Walk into Paradise was set in Papua New Guinea, then an Australian territory, and starred an Australian, Chips Rafferty, both The Stowaway and The Restless and the Damned were essentially French stories, albeit with international casts.

Rafferty and Robinson contributed £40,000 of the film's budget, coming from hire of studio facilities to two films shot in Tahiti and their involvement in several episodes of the US documentary series, High Adventure.

Robinson said they did not have the funds to be a full partner in the film but they contributed 30% of the costs while the French partners contributed 70%. "It's a major international film, with American stars in it, and French stars," said Robinson. "Andrea Parisy was a French star and the French ended up having to carry the whole of the load, which they could afford to do."

Robinson said "Dorfmann is one of the most brilliant producers in Europe. And if we could have maintained some working relationship with Dorfmann, we might have got somewhere. He's a very talented producer."

Edmond O'Brien later said his net from the film "will obviously exceed the $150,000 or $200,000 most actors can hope to realize from a Hollywood salary." Producer Dorfman claimed "The revenue a European production can get without a Hollywood star is, at best, limited. On the other hand many actors such as Mr O'Brien and Robert Ryan are top attractions in the European and Oriental countries where we obtain our major income." Dorfman said they signed O'Brien on the strength of his performance in The Girl Can't Help It adding "throughout Europe it was considered a comedy of importance and established O'Brien as a major attraction there - much more, for instance than his Academy Award role in The Barefoot Contessa."

O'Brien called his role "half Wallace Beery half Humphrey Bogart".

=== Production ===
The film started shooting in September 1958 in Tahiti and Tuamotu Island.

Originally Lee Robinson was to direct the English-language version, which had happened on the first two films, but after a few days Yves Allégret directed both.

Filming took three months. O'Brien said "There were no studios so we had to shoot our interiors where we could. One place had a tin roof, and you can imagine how that was, combined with our lights from the color camera." He described the weather as murder. "Hot? That doesn't begin to describe it. I sweated right through a mattress every night."

In February 1959 Variety reported Basehart had finished filming interior scenes in Paris. In April 1959 Variety called the described the film as "about a fight over mines in Tahiti and may loom an actioner with playoff chances. It has names in Richard Basehart and Edmond O'Brien."

O'Brien arrived in Paris in July 1960 to dub the film into English.

== Release ==
The film screened at the Locarno Film Festival in July 1959 where it was reviewed by Variety who said:

There is secondary marquee appeal for the U.S. in this via the names of Richard Basehart and Edmond O'Brien, However, this tale of ruthless ambition is somewhat plodding, making it primarily for dual spots in the U.S.... Yves Allegret's direction is listless. O'Brien... and Basehart... cannot do much with their stereotyped roles, while Andrea Paisy is incapable of giving animation to the complicated character of the ruthless character. Also she is badly lensed making her less than the desirable type she is interpreting. Color is par while technical values are good. Some added appeal is the on-the-spot Tahiti lensing. There is some Australian money in this pic and also an English version which could be used for supporting fare in America.

Filmink wrote "the filmmakers made an effort to shoot more scenes outdoors than The Stowaway, and quite well: it's full of interesting compositions, colour and movement. It's nice, if kind of wasted on this movie... It still feels odd that Robinson and Rafferty made the movie in the first place – a film noir type tale was so unlike their first three efforts, which made money, and closer to their fourth and fifth movies, which flopped."

The film was a box office failure and did not achieve cinema release in England, the United States and Australia (although it was released in France) and ended the feature film partnership of Chips Rafferty and Lee Robinson.

It was sold to American TV where it screened the title The Climbers.

Robinson later said in 1976 the film had "no market. Never been released in Australia. It's never been released in England. The same problem was evident in England. It was a festival picture in a couple of countries. The French version ran at Laussane. Yeah, television was the problem. And it was sold to television. (But not to Australian television.)"

After making the film Robinson "got out of feature production completely. The feeling was there was no future in it. No future whatsoever."
