= John Chandos (actor) =

British actor (1917–1987)

- Born: John Chandos McConnell; 27 July 1917; Glasgow, Lanarkshire, Scotland
- Died: 21 September 1987 (aged 70); Chichester, West Sussex, England
- Years active: 1941–1969

John Chandos McConnell (27 July 1917 – 21 September 1987) was a Scottish film and television actor.

He won a scholarship to RADA in 1936. During the Second World War he served with the Seaforth Highlanders, Parachute Regiment and the GHQ Liaison Regiment.

He appeared in the 1967 The Avengers episode entitled "Murdersville".

== Filmography ==
- 49th Parallel (1941) - Lohrmann
- The Next of Kin (1942) - No 16: his contact
- The First of the Few (1942) - Krantz
- The Life and Adventures of Nicholas Nickleby (1947) - Employment Agent (uncredited)
- Secret People (1952) - John
- Derby Day (1952) - Man on Train (uncredited)
- The Crimson Pirate (1952) - Stub Ear
- Trent's Last Case (1952) - Tim O'Reilly (uncredited)
- The Long Memory (1953) - Boyd
- 36 Hours (1953) - Orville Hart
- The Million Pound Note (1954) -2nd. Businessman at Bumbles Hôtel (uncredited)
- The Love Lottery (1954) - Gulliver Kee
- Twist of Fate (1954 film) (1954) - Nino, The Hairdresser (U.S. ' Beautiful Stranger ')
- Beau Brummell (1954) - Silva (uncredited)
- Carrington V.C. (1955) - Adjutant John Rawlinson
- Simba (1955) - Settler at Meeting
- The Ship That Died of Shame (1955) - Raines
- One Way Out (1955) - Danvers
- The Green Man (1956) - McKechnie
- The Battle of the River Plate (1956) - Dr. Otto Langmann - German Minister, Montevideo
- Time Without Pity (1957) - First Journalist
- Doctor at Large (1957) - O'Malley
- I Accuse! (1958) - Drumont
- The Witness (1959) - Lodden
- Jungle Street (1960) - Jacko Fielding
- The Little Ones (1965) - Lord Brantley
- Two Gentlemen Sharing (1969) - Advertising Executive (final film role)
