= Sky without Birds =

1952 Australian stage play by Oriel Gray

- Written by: Oriel Gray
- Original language: English
- Genre: drama

Premiere
- Date premiered: March 15, 1952
- Place premiered: New Theatre, Sydney

Sky without Birds is a 1952 Australian stage play by Oriel Gray.

The play made its debut at the New Theatre in Sydney. It was then produced in Adelaide and Brisbane.

== Radio adaptation ==
The play was adapted for radio by the ABC in 1952.

The play was produced again in 1957.

Leslie Rees called it "a courageous tackling of a current social theme, with sensitive writing and feeling, but (in the stage version) too sluggish a movement towards a resolution. In the radio version, it played well."

== Premise ==
At a railway settlement on the Nullarbor Plain, a group of Australians is joined by an immigrant, who is Jewish. He falls in love with a married woman.
