= Walk Into Paradise =

1956 film

- US film poster
- Directed by: Lee Robinson; Marcello Pagliero
- Written by: Rex Rienits
- Based on: story by Lee Robinson; Chips Rafferty
- Produced by: Marcello Pagliero; Chips Rafferty; Lee Robinson
- Starring: Chips Rafferty; Françoise Christophe
- Cinematography: Carl Kayser
- Edited by: Alex Ezard
- Music by: Georges Auric
- Production companies: Southern International Productions (Australia); Discifilm (France)
- Distributed by: MGM (Aus); Patric Pictures (US)
- Release dates: 28 July 1956 (France); 24 October 1956 (Australia)
- Running time: 93 minutes
- Countries: Australia; France
- Languages: English; French
- Budget: £65,000
- Box office: £90,000 (England); 1,333,157 admissions (France)

Walk Into Paradise (also known as Walk Into Hell) is a 1956 Australian-French international co-production adventure film directed by Lee Robinson and Marcello Pagliero and starring Chips Rafferty and Françoise Christophe. It was shot on location in the highlands of Papua New Guinea and was one of the most popular Australian films ever made until that date.

== Plot ==
In New Guinea, Ned "Shark Eye" Kelley floats into town on a raft, suffering from malaria and heat. He has discovered oil in a valley. The local Australian District Officer, Fred, tells Kelley he cannot exploit the oil until the area has been officially "opened up".

In Port Moresby, another District Officer, Steve MacAllister, is about to go on eight months' leave when called in to help on the expedition, as he is the only person who knows the area. MacAllister has to help put in an airstrip so geologists can fly to the territory.

MacAllister has to take along United Nations doctor Louise Dumarcet on the expedition. He is unhappy about this, as it is Louise's first time in the tropics. However, when there is a disease outbreak in a town, Louise helps treat some children.

The expedition arrives at a village and meet crocodile hunter Jeff Clayton. Kelley is reluctant to enter a village. He reveals his brother was killed by the locals. They decide to enter anyway. While treating a villager, Louise draws the patient's blood. This is seen by another villager who puts a snake in her bed. The snake bites Louise but she is treated by Jeff, who then kisses her.

The villagers rise up against the expedition and a fight ensues where Kelley is speared to death. However the children Louise was treating recover, ending the battle. The villagers help clear an air strip enabling a plane to land.

== Cast ==
- Chips Rafferty as Steve MacAllister
- Françoise Christophe as Dr. Louise Dumarcet
- Reg Lye as Ned 'Shark-eye' Kelley
- Pierre Cressoy as Jeff Clayton
- Sergeant Major Somu as Sgt.-Major Towalaka
- District Officer Fred Kaad as himself
- Capt. Richard Davis as himself

== Development ==
Chips Rafferty and Lee Robinson had produced two earlier films starring Rafferty, The Phantom Stockman and King of the Coral Sea. Their formula was to set the action in an exotic location and for this third movie they chose New Guinea, where Rafferty and Robinson had both served in World War Two.

In May 1954 Rafferty and Robinson returned to Wewak from a location trip up the Sepik River. They announced they planned to film at Kambaramba, a village on the swamp lagoon, at the end of July with a cast and technical crew of 40. It would be the location of their next film. They were so enthused they planned to make several movies in New Guinea.

Filming was delayed. Richard Boone and Chips Rafferty became friends making Kangaroo together. In December 1954 Boone announced he would act in the film, then called The Head Hunters. Filming on this project was also delayed reportedly due to poor weather.

The movie was based on a story by Robinson and Rex Rienits wrote a script. However Robinson later said they "weren't able to use" what Rienits had written. Robinson elaborated:

The emphasis was to exploit all of the values around the story. And whether it was wrong or not wrong, I worked for a long time to an old Hollywood motto. They say, "Don't give people a new background and a new story concept at the same time, because you'll only confuse them. They can't handle that. If you're going to have a completely new type of story approach, or different format in a story, set it a known background, like New York, or something that people are familiar with, filmically. If you're going to have a completely new background, if you're going to shoot the picture on the Panama Canal or something, have a fairly conventional story-line, because the two differences are hard for audiences to handle.

=== French involvement ===
French producer Paul-Edmond Decharme, best known for Manon and Bluebeard, proposed Rafferty and Robinson go into business with the French company Discifilm. The script was rewritten to accommodate two French stars.

In April 1955 Rafferty said the film would be called Walk into Paradise and that Ann Vernon would play the female lead. Later that month Rafferty and Robinson issued a prospectus for investors to put money into the film, offering debentures at £50 each. They claimed The Phantom Stockman had repaid investors 27% and King of the Coral Sea had repaid them 10%.

In May 1955 Decharne announced he would make two films a year in the Pacific. The first two would be co productions with Rafferty and Robinson:, starting withWalk into Paradise, which would be shot on location in New Guinea, in English and French versions. The stars would be Rafferty, Reg Lye, and French players Pierre Cressoy and Francoise Christophe (Vernon having dropped out). Robinson would direct while Marcel Pagliero would be the dialogue director of the French version. The main party of the film unit will leave for New Guinea on 11 June. The voices-of the French stars will be used in both French and English versions. The voices of the Australian stars would be "dubbed" with French dialogue for the French version.

Music for Paradise would be written by Georges Auric, well-known composer of film music and the writer of the title track from Moulin Rouge.

The second film would be made in Tahiti with French director Yves Allegret as the principal director and Robinson as director of the English version. This movie would be shot in Cinema-Scope and would hopefully star Gerard Philippe.

"I was told that the Pacific was very wide, and its capital was Sydney* so I came here," said Decharne."I also heard that Australians appreciated French films better than any other country outside Europe. 'La Ronde' made more money in Australia than it did in France."

The film would cost £150,000 and according to one account was financed on a 50/50 basis by Southern International and Decharme's company, Disci Films. However Robinson later clarified:

We put up 70 per cent, and he [the French producer] put up 30 per cent. And we had the world-excluding Europe... South America in total - and French- speaking Canada. I think that was the French territory. The next film, they would put up 70 per cent, and we would put up 30. And then each one had the right to nominate the alternate pictures.So we saw this as a procedure of being able to get for the 100 per cent, two pictures for one. And the three that we had designed in Southern International, would become six under this system. So to us, it was a first-class deal.

Robinson said 60% of the money invested in the film from his side came from housewives.

== Shooting ==
The French actors arrived in Australia in June 1955. Shooting began in New Guinea in June 1955 and took place over twelve weeks. The unit was based out of Goroka.

Every scene was shot twice, once in French, once in English: Pagliero would direct the French version, Robinson would do the English. Robinson got along well with Pagliero calling him "one of the most delightful guys you would ever meet in your life" He says after the first few days of filming both "very quickly realised that you can only have one boss on the floor of the set." They decided that Pagliero would work through the scenes with the French actors in the morning and when the Australian actors had to speak French, Pagliero would "get all the dialogue done out on idiot boards for them."

Robinson said Pagliero "stood back from the film and worked with his actors a bit, helped the Australian actors with the French dialogue" but contributed more than Robinson originally thought because they would discuss scenes at night.

Robinson said he clashed with the Frenchman only once, during a scene involving the lowering of the Australian flag but "it was a national argument rather than a film argument. But he was terribly aware of the fact that confusion would arise if the two of us were trying to run the set."

Robinson recalled:

What I was looking for - from the French, of course - were two good actors. Christophe was a beautiful actress, but the bloke [Pierre Cressoy] was a sort of an action actor... a very big, good-looking fella...[but] I was looking for a performance like you expected out of the French people. Christophe, the French girl, was marvellous. She could do that. But he was such a bad actor, and she used to complain because he couldn't remember dialogue, and he used to write al his dialogue out. And in two-shots, where it's him and her and over the shoulder, he used to stick it on her forehead. (Laughter) And she came to me, and said, "I will not have him sticking these things on my forehead". And then somebody told me - I think it was Pagliero, that in a picture with [Gina] Lollobrigida, he actually wrote his dialogue in lipstick on her forehead! - So he could remember it. He used to have bits of paper everywhere. Had a scene here and he had a little bit of paper down there with dialogue on it.

Despite the difficulties of shooting on location, the film was infused only three days behind schedule.

The film was edited in Paris. Robinson said "all of our pictures were fairly religiously, totally post-synched. And there was a tremendous amount of post- synching that went on. We devised post-synching techniques and stuff here to suit ourselves. We were post-synching more than anybody else in the world, I think, at that time."

== Release ==
The film was released in France as L'Odyssée du Capitaine Steve. A novelisation of the script by Gavin Casey was published in 1956. The film screened at the 1956 Cannes Film Festival. Director Lee Robinson was nominated for the Golden Palm Award but was beaten by Jacques-Yves Cousteau and Louis Malle for Le Monde du silence.

Robinson said the film made "fair money" in Australia. He made two more French co productions, The Stowaway and The Restless and the Damned.

According to Filmink:

Walk into Paradise isn’t a classic, far from it: Robinson and Rafferty could cobble together a decent story but never mastered script writing, and Robinson’s direction always seemed lethargic. However, the basic structure holds, something is always happening on screen, Rafferty is great, Lye is fun, Christophe is pretty, the location photography is superb and the whole movie is culturally fascinating.

== US release ==
American producer Joseph E. Levine purchased the film for distribution in the US for $60,000. Robinson said he had to sell these rights in order to finance his involvement in The Stowaway and the deal was not good for Robinson. Levine asked for two minutes of action footage to put up the front, which Robinson provided, saying "I got half the price of the picture for that two minutes of material." Levine's purchase of the film was announced in April 1957 and it was released through his company Patric Pictures.

When the film did poor business he retitled it Walk Into Hell, which increased its earnings dramatically. In 1958 Levine claimed the film and Godzilla had grossed over $1,500,000.

Robinson claimed at one stage the movie was one of the 100 top grossers in the US. In 1976 Robinson said it was the highest grossing Australian film ever, including a gross of over £200,000 in England. However little of this returned to him.

=== Critical reception ===
The Los Angeles Times called it "a fairly pleasant travelogue".

Variety called it "more of an adventure travelog... done in color with a definite storyline and benefits from some excellent photography of the New Guinea locale" and "some exciting sequences."
