= Joan Young =

British actress (1900–1984)

- Born: Joan Cecilia Frances Wragge; 1 February 1900; Newcastle upon Tyne, UK
- Died: 9 October 1984 (aged 84); London, UK
- Occupation: Actress
- Years active: 1934–1980
- Spouse: John Young
- Children: 1

Joan Young (born Joan Cecilia Frances Wragge; 1 February 1900 – 9 October 1984) was a British character actress of stage, screen and radio, perhaps best known for her portrayal of Lady Chesapeake in Big Bad Mouse and for the wartime radio series, Navy Mixture. She also appeared in several films and TV productions.

== Early life and career ==
Born in Newcastle upon Tyne on 1 February 1900 (Note: Regarding the preponderance of 20th century reference sources—at least prior to her death—giving Young's year of birth as 1903 (as well as the somewhat tenuous nature of her claim to Geordie status, Newcastle Evening Chronicle columnist Phil Penfold held forth in his brief Young profile, penned near the end of her career, on the occasion of a spring 1980 revival of Big Bad Mouse EVERY actor or actress of note appears in the show business bible, 'Who's Who in the Theatre,' and Joan Young is no exception. There, it gives career details – as well the statistical facts about births, marriages and appearances. Only in Joan's case, the entry isn't as accurate as it might be. Her birth date (and let's be respectful to one of the stage's leading ladies) is slightly out of alignment. But that doesn't alter the fact that Joan was born in Newcastle, while her parents were performing in pantomime at the Theatre Royal – quite a few years back. And her claim to being a Geordie rests on a residency of exactly three weeks.) (and, purportedly, relocated three weeks later (Note: At least as early as 1959, and as late as 1980, it was reported that Young's Geordie or "Novocastrian" connection was purely happenstance, and fleeting at best, brought about solely by a local theatrical engagement secured by her father, and concluding along with that engagement, roughly three weeks later.)), Young was the daughter of music hall performers Nellie Blanche C. (née Parker) and Charles Alfred Romaine Wragg, known professionally as Charles Pastor.). Speaking with reporter Beverly Howells almost eight decades later, Young acknowledged that, given her parents' continued performing, it was "really my grandmother who provided any motherly care I received as a child." She was educated at convents in Bournemouth and in France.

In April 1915, the then 15-year-old Young—as Joan Wragge—appeared in A Crown of Sorrows, a 5-act play set in Elizabethan era Scotland and staged at Bournemouth's St. Peter's Hall to benefit Belgian refugees. Alongside a generous sampling of that era's British royalty, the play featured Wragge as "Jamie, court jester at Holyrood".

On Tuesday 22 September 1936, the BBC aired Young's "satirical revue" entitled Fictional Fame on Parade (with music by Nene Smith), featuring a cast including, among others, Young, Edward Cooper, Marie Dainton, and the BBC Variety Orchestra, conducted by Charles Shadwell.

In 1938, Young was cast in radio adaptations of two well-known British novels: P. G. Wodehouse's Sam the Sudden (adapted by Jack Inglis as Semi-Detached), (Note: This adaptation bears no relation to playwright David Turner's like-named work, in which Young would appear more than two decades later, opposite Laurence Olivier.) and, in serialized form, Charles Reade's The Cloister and the Hearth, broadcast on 12 consecutive Sundays, beginning on 15 October. In December, an original radio drama penned by Leslie Stokes, The Snowman, starred Holland Bennett, Alec Guinness, Betty Jardine, Mary Merrall, Joan Young, Ernest Jay, and G. R. Schjelderup.

Reviewing the 1961 revival of Shaw's Heartbreak House staged at Wyndham's Theatre, Stage and Television Today's R. B. Marriott rated Young's performance the "best Nurse Guiness I have seen". The following year, Young—as aggrieved in-law Garnet Hadfield—went head to head with Laurence Olivier's Fred Midway in the London production of David Turner's Semi-Detached.

Amidst a generally mixed review of "The Room", a season 1 episode of James MacTaggart's 1964 series, Teletale, Stage and Television Today critic Marjorie Morris makes note of the frustrating dilemma posed by the episode's seemingly saving grace being all but negated by its miserly deployment.

Joan Young gave a powerful performance as Madame Darbedat. It was really too good, because I wanted to see more of her and felt cheated when I didn't.

In 1980, the 80-year-old Young amassed two notable credits to round out a six-decade-plus career; first, by once again reprising her Big Bad Mouse role alongside fellow first-nighters Jimmy Edwards and Eric Sykes, and, finally, by appearing in two consecutive episodes of the BBC series All Creatures Great and Small, as Miss Westerman, an elderly dog owner, who is concerned about the well-being and whereabouts of her ailing companion, misplaced prior to critical surgery by the putative caregivers.

== Personal life and death ==
In the summer of 1923, in Chorlton, Lancashire, the 23-year-old Wragge married journalist John Young. Their marriage produced one child, daughter April Young, a London-based agent whose clients include June Whitfield, Joe Gladwin, John Blythe as well as Young herself, and her Bad Mouse co-star Jimmy Edwards,

Following a short illness, Young died on 9 October 1984 at the Royal Masonic Hospital in Hammersmith, London, aged 84. She was survived by her husband and daughter.

== Selected filmography ==
- Victoria the Great (1937) – Girl
- Vice Versa (1948) – Mrs. Grimstone
- The Fallen Idol (1948) – Mrs. Barrow
- Trottie True (1949) – Mrs. True
- The Small Voice (1950) – Mrs. Potter, the housekeeper
- Time Gentlemen, Please! (1952) – Mrs. Round
- Dixon of Dock Green
  - Season 2 Episode 8 "On Mother Kelly's Doorstep" (1956) – Nan Kelly
  - Season 3 Episode 6 "The Black Noah" (1957) – Florrie Cross
  - Season 4 Episode 13 "The Crooked Key" (1958) – Maggie Braham
  - Season 6
    - Episode 22 "A Lead from Mother Kelly" (1960) – Nan Kelly
    - Episode 30 "Everything Goes in Threes" (1960) – Nan Kelly (uncredited)
  - Season 7
    - Episode 23 "Duffy Strikes It Rich" (1961) – Mrs. Donnelly
    - Episode 24 "The Persistent Widow" (1961) – Mrs. Donnelly
  - Season 8
    - Episode 26 "Bells in My Ears" (1962) – Florrie Mellon
  - Season 10
    - Episode 7 "Thicker Than Water" (1963) – Miss Wilkinson
- The Admirable Crichton (1957) – Mrs. Perkins, the housekeeper at Loam Hall
- Suddenly, Last Summer (1959) – Sister Felicity
- Carry On Constable (1960) – Lady Mayoress
- Stolen Hours (1963) – Mrs. Lambert
- The Wednesday Play
  - "The Bond" (1965) – Edie
- Z-Cars
  - "But the Crying..." (1965) – Mrs. Haynes
  - "Anyone Can Make a Mistake: Part 1" (1968) – Mildred Taylor
- Doctor Who
  - Season 3 Episode 24 "Priest of Death" (1966) – Catherine de' Medici
  - Season 3 Episode 25 "Bell of Doom" (1966) – Catherine de Medici
- Thirteen Against Fate
  - "The Traveller" (1966) – Jaja
- The Plank (1967) – Woman in Bus Queue with fur wrap
- The Last Shot You Hear (1968) – Mrs. Jowett
- Blood from the Mummy's Tomb (1971) – Mrs. Caporal
- Thirty-Minute Theatre
  - "Allotment" (1971) – Mam
- Billy Liar
  - Season 1 Episode 4 "Billy and the Monster" (1973) – Mrs. Purvis
- All Creatures Great and Small
  - Season 3 Episode 7 "Be Prepared" (1980) – Miss Westerman
  - Season 3 Episode 8 "A Dying Breed" (1980) – Miss Westerman
