= The Whole Truth =

The Whole Truth may refer to:

== Film and television ==
- The Whole Truth (1923 film), a film starring Stan Laurel
- The Whole Truth (1958 film), a British film directed by John Guillermin
- The Whole Truth (2009 film), an American comedy starring Eric Roberts, Elisabeth Röhm, and Sean Patrick Flanery
- The Whole Truth (2016 film), an American thriller film starring Keanu Reeves
- The Whole Truth (2021 film), a Thai mystery thriller film
- The Whole Truth (TV series), a 2010 American legal drama series
- "The Whole Truth" (The Twilight Zone), an episode
- "The Whole Truth" (Lost), an episode
- "The Whole Truth" (Medium), an episode

== Other ==
- The Whole Truth (play), a 1956 play by Philip Mackie, basis for the 1958 film
- The Whole Truth (Point of Grace album), 1995
- The Whole Truth (Da' T.R.U.T.H. album), 2011
- The Whole Truth (novel), a novel by David Baldacci
- The Whole Truth, a novel by Janice Kaplan

== See also ==
- Sworn testimony
