= Peter Coe (director) =

English theatre director

- Born: Peter Leonard Coe; 18 April 1929; London, England
- Died: 25 May 1987 (aged 58); London, England
- Education: London Academy of Music and Dramatic Art
- Occupations: Actor and director
- Years active: 1959–1987
- Spouse(s): 4, including Maria Caday 1952; Tsai Chin 1958; Suzanne Fuller 1962
- Children: 3

Peter Leonard Coe (18 April 1929 – 25 May 1987), was an English film and theatre director and actor.

== Early life ==
Coe was born in London on 18 April 1929 and graduated from the London Academy of Music and Dramatic Art.

== Career ==
After beginning his career as an actor, Coe staged dramas, musicals and operas across several continents in a long career. His first London success came in 1959 with the musical Lock Up Your Daughters and by 1961 he had three hits running simultaneously. He also directed both the West End and Broadway productions of Oliver! as well as its U.S. national tour and the 1983 London and 1984 Broadway revivals.

His operatic credits included The Love of Three Oranges, The Angel of Fire, and Ernani.

In 1981 Coe received an Antoinette Perry Award nomination as Best Director for A Life, and in 1982 he won the award for his revival of Othello.

His appointments included artistic director for the Citadel Theatre in Edmonton, Canada in 1980, and the American Shakespeare Theatre in Stratford, in United States and prior to his death artistic director of the Churchill Theatre in Bromley, Kent.

== Awards and nominations ==
He was thrice nominated for the Tony Award on Broadway; in 1963 for Best Director (musical) for Oliver!, 1981 for Best Director (play) for A Life before winning for Best Director (drama) with Othello in 1982.

== Theatre productions ==
Production	Playwright	Venue	Year
Lock Up Your Daughters	Musical by Lionel Bart	Mermaid Theatre, London	1959
The World of Suzie Wong	Paul Osborne	Prince of Wales Theatre, London	1959
The Miracle Worker	William Gibson	London	1961
The World of Suzie Wong	Paul Osborn	London	1961
Oliver!	Musical written by Lionel Bart	New Theatre, London	1961
Castle in Sweden	Francois Sagan	Piccadilly Theatre, London	1962
Caligula		Phoenix Theatre, London	1964
Golden Boy	Clifford Odets		1964
Oliver!	Written by Lionel Bart	Hanna Theatre, Cleveland, Ohio	1964
On a Clear Day You Can See Forever			1966
The Italian Straw Hat		Chichester Festival Theatre	1967
The Skin of Our Teeth		Chichester Festival Theatre	1969
Oliver!		Piccadilly Theatre, London	1968 revival
The Caucasian Chalk Circle		Chichester Festival Theatre	1969
Kiss Me, Kate		London Coliseum	1970
Peer Gynt		Chichester Festival Theatre	1970
Hamlet	William Shakespeare	Bankside Globe Playhouse, London	1972
Decameron '73		Roundhouse, London	1973
Tonight We Improvise		Chichester Festival Theatre	1974
Mister Lincoln			1980
On the Twentieth Century		Her Majesty's Theatre, London	1980
Barnum		London Palladium	1981
Henry V	William Shakespeare	Shakespeare Memorial Theatre, Stratford, Connecticut	1981
Hamlet		Shakespeare Memorial Theatre, Stratford, Connecticut	1982
Othello	William Shakespeare	Shakespeare Memorial Theatre, Stratford, Connecticut	1982 revival
Barnum		London Palladium	1983 revival
Oliver!		London	1983 revival
Hello Dolly		Birmingham Rep and Prince of Wales Theatre with Danny La Rue	
Barnum		Manchester Opera House 1984 revival with Wendy Toye	
Great Expectations		Birmingham Rep and The Old Vic, London	1984
Oliver!		Broadway	1984 revival
Jane Eyre		Chichester Festival Theatre	1986

== Filmography ==
- Lock Up Your Daughters (1969)
- Barnum (1981)
- Mr Lincoln (1981)
