= What Became of Jack and Jill? =

1972 British film by Bill Bain

- Directed by: Bill Bain
- Written by: Roger Marshall
- Based on: novel The Ruthless Ones by Laurence Moody
- Produced by: Max Rosenberg; Milton Subotsky executive Edgar J. Scherick
- Starring: Mona Washbourne; Paul Nicholas; Vanessa Howard
- Cinematography: Gerry Turpin
- Edited by: Peter Tanner
- Music by: Carl Davis
- Production companies: Amicus Productions; Palomar Pictures
- Distributed by: 20th Century Fox
- Release date: 16 June 1972
- Running time: 93 minutes
- Country: United Kingdom
- Language: English

What Became of Jack and Jill? is a 1972 British horror film directed by Bill Bain and starring Mona Washbourne, Paul Nicholas, and Vanessa Howard. It was part of an abandoned attempt by Amicus Pictures to differentiate itself from Hammer Studios by breaking into the exploitation film market. Studio executives were ultimately too disturbed by the final product to release it under the Amicus name, and they sold the film to 20th Century Fox.

== Plot ==
Johnnie Tallent is a callous young mod who lives with his elderly, invalid grandmother, Alice. Lazy and unmotivated, Johnnie dedicates most of his time to taking care of Alice to remain in her good graces so that he can inherit her small fortune and valuable house after she dies. He spends what free time he has with his girlfriend Jill Standish, an even more callous travel agent.

Jill encourages Johnnie to take active measures to accelerate his grandmother's death, so that the two of them can get married and retire on Alice's fortune. Together, the two concoct a plan to induce a heart attack in Alice by gaslighting her, effectively murdering her yet leaving no evidence of the crime. To this end, Johnnie slowly begins convincing Alice that London's twenty-somethings, feeling that the elderly have become a drain on society, are planning a youth revolution, with the goal of either killing the elderly or placing them in internment camps. Johnnie manipulates Alice's access to newspapers and television, using stories and footage of protests to further convince her that the youth revolution is growing and becoming progressively more violent.

To further enhance his story, Johnnie and Jill cover the wall outside Alice's bedroom window with ageist graffiti. After several weeks, Alice grows paranoid and reclusive, and her health seriously deteriorates. Finally, Jill uses her position at the travel agency to schedule a large parade to pass by Alice's house one afternoon; that morning, Johnnie tells her that the revolution has begun, and that rioters are going door-to-door looking for elderly people to kill or intern. When the parade arrives, Alice, already in a panic, suffers a heart attack. Johnnie allows her to die before calling an ambulance.

At the office of Alice's probate attorney, Johnnie and Jill learn that she placed a codicil in her will that, as long as he remains in a relationship with Jill, Johnnie is only allowed to inherit her house. If he wishes to inherit any of her money, he must sever all ties with Jill and marry another woman. Johnnie and Jill initially attempt to find well-paying jobs of their own in order to keep the house, but neither are willing to work hard, and eventually, their electricity, gas, and water are all turned off. The pair concoct a plan for Johnnie to date and marry an impressionable young woman in quick succession, allowing Johnnie to collect his inheritance; he can then end the relationship and be with Jill. However, Jill becomes violently jealous when Johnnie appears to develop feelings for their target, and the two get into a physical altercation. Johnnie accidentally stabs Jill in the abdomen, and she stumbles out into the street. Neighbours call the police, who arrive as a sobbing Johnnie crawls towards Alice's room, screaming for his grandmother.

== Cast ==
- Mona Washbourne as Alice Tallent
- Paul Nicholas as Johnnie
- Vanessa Howard as Jill Standish
- Peter Copley as Dixon
- Peter Jeffrey as Dr. Graham
- George A. Cooper as Trouncer
- George Benson as vicar
- Angela Down as caller

== Production ==
Amicus Pictures had been known through the 1960s as a purveyor of gothic horror and horror anthologies, largely competing with Hammer Film Production's similar output. At the dawn of the 1970s, Amicus decided to attempt to differentiate itself from Hammer by appealing to exploitation film fans with a more violent, sexualized picture than they normally released. To this end, they purchased the rights to Laurence Moody's novel The Ruthless Ones, with the intention of making it their very first exploitation picture under the title The Ruthless Ones. The picture was simultaneously meant to serve as a vehicle for Vanessa Howard and turn her into Amicus' own scream queen, based largely on her performance in Mumsy, Nanny, Sonny and Girly.

Shot at Shepperton Studios, it was filmed in 1970 as Romeo and Juliet '71; the resultant product shocked Amicus' executives, who began to doubt the desirability of being associated with so dark a work. As a result, the film was shelved and not released until 1972, under its current title.

The director, Bill Bain, was an Australian with a strong record in television. He called the film "a savage indictment of the shallow education young people get today."

== Critical reception ==
The Monthly Film Bulletin wrote: "An agonisingly slow and uninteresting thriller which teases one into concentrating on a highly improbable piece of deception by implying that its enfants terribles will at least meet with a suitably surprising retribution. The denouement, a feebly contrived variation on thieves falling out, merely provides the final disenchantment."

Variety wrote: "With the exception of a profesfessional try by vet actress Mona Washbourne to breath [sic] some life into this routine programmer, it hasn't much going for it, unless one gives points for topflight direction and photography."

Roger Greenspun from The New York Times gave the film a negative review, criticizing the film's story, and relative "plainness". Greenspun concluded his review by writing, "I suppose Bill Bain's direction should be praised for its restraint and for its resistance to almost all false notes of terror. But that is not enough to support a movie the main achievement of which is to work from a beginning, to a middle, to something like a logical ending."

TV Guide awarded the film one out of four stars, stating "Excellent art direction and photography fail to save this clinker."

Graeme Clark from The Spinning Image gave the film a mixed 5/10 stars, commending the film's claustrophobic atmosphere, and Howard's performance; while criticizing the film's slow pace, and climax, which he felt was "built too soon".
