= Valerie Leon =

British actress (born 1943)

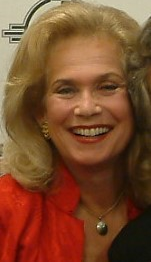
- Leon (2004; age 60)
- Born: Valerie Therese Leon; 12 November 1943 (age 82); Hampstead, London, England
- Occupations: Actress; model
- Years active: 1967–present
- Spouse: Michael Mills (m. 1974; died 1988)
- Children: 2
- Website: valerieleon.com

Valerie Therese Leon (born 12 November 1943) is an English actress and model who has had roles in many film and television productions, including six of the Carry On film series and two James Bond films, The Spy Who Loved Me (1977) and Never Say Never Again (1983) alongside Roger Moore and Sean Connery, respectively. She also had roles in high-profile films such as The Italian Job (1969), The Wild Geese (1978), and Revenge of the Pink Panther (1978), as well as a starring role in the Hammer horror film Blood from the Mummy's Tomb (1971).

In the 1970s, Leon appeared in the Hai Karate television adverts, which gained her substantial publicity. She also became known globally as a sex symbol due to her glamorous looks and attractive figure, and was often referred to as the "English Raquel Welch".

== Early life ==
Leon was born in Hampstead, London, in 1943, to Henry and Daphne Leon (née Ehrmann), being the eldest of four children. Her father was a director of a textile company, and her mother, who trained at RADA, ended her acting career to become a full-time mother.

After attending the Channing School for Girls, Leon attended the College for Distributive Trades, before then moving to Paris to become an au pair girl. She did a spell of modelling before returning to England.

== Career ==
Leon's career began as a trainee fashion buyer at Harrods. In April 1965, she went to an audition which led to her becoming a chorus girl in a touring production of The Belle of New York. When the tour in Britain was cancelled after some weeks, she contacted Central Casting and started to work as an extra in movies; her first film was That Riviera Touch (1966) starring Morecambe and Wise, for which she was hired as a girl in bikini. Around the same time, she appeared with Barbra Streisand in Funny Girl at the Prince of Wales Theatre in London's West End.

Leon appeared in six films of the Carry On series: Carry On Up The Khyber (1968), Carry On Camping (1969), Carry On Again Doctor (1969), Carry On Up the Jungle (1970), Carry On Matron (1972) and Carry On Girls (1973), and appeared in two James Bond films, The Spy Who Loved Me (1977) as a Hotel Receptionist, and as Lady in Bahamas in Never Say Never Again (1983). Her other film appearances include Revenge of the Pink Panther, The Wild Geese (both 1978), The Rise and Rise of Michael Rimmer (1970, as the secretary Tanya), a hotel receptionist in The Italian Job (1969), and a callgirl in No Sex Please, We're British (1973). The Hammer horror film Blood from the Mummy's Tomb (1971) gave Leon a dual starring role, as a reincarnated Egyptian queen. She was cast in this at the insistence of James Carreras, the head of Hammer. Filmink wrote "the studio's decision never to star Valerie Leon in anything again when she so patently had abundant star quality only makes sense when you recall Hammer failed to properly re-use all its female horror stars".

Leon's TV credits include The Saint, Randall and Hopkirk, Up Pompeii!, The Avengers, Space: 1999, The Persuaders, Last of the Summer Wine, and the 1968 version of Johnny Speight's provocative comedy-drama If There Weren't Any Blacks You'd Have To Invent Them, as a nurse.

From 1969 to 1976, Leon played the woman driven wild by a man wearing Hai Karate aftershave in a highly successful series of British commercials for the product. Leon parodied her role in The Goodies 1976 episode "It Might as Well Be String" (S06 E05) by attacking Tim Brooke-Taylor.

In the 1970s and 1980s, Leon appeared in several UK national tours of plays.

Starting in 2010, Leon has appeared on stage throughout the UK in her one-woman show, Up Front with Valerie Leon, an on-going series of performances.

== Personal life ==
Leon was married to the television producer Michael Mills from 1974 until his death in 1988. The couple had two children: a son, Leon, born in 1975; and a daughter, Merope, born in 1977.

== Filmography ==
=== Film ===
Year	Title	Role	Notes
1966	That Riviera Touch	Girl in Bikini	uncredited
1966	The Sandwich Man	Girl in Crowd	uncredited
1967	Mister Ten Per Cent	Girl at Theatre Party	uncredited
1967	Smashing Time	Tove's Secretary	
1968	Carry On Up the Khyber	Hospitality Girl	
1969	Carry On Camping	Miss Dobbin	
1969	The Italian Job	Royal Lancaster Hotel Receptionist	
1969	Carry On Again Doctor	Deirdre	
1969	Zeta One	Atropos	
1970	Carry On Up the Jungle	Leda	
1970	This, That and the Other	Bath Girl	
1970	The Man Who Had Power Over Women	Glenda	
1970	The Rise and Rise of Michael Rimmer	Tanya	
1970	All the Way Up	Miss Hardwick	
1971	Blood from the Mummy's Tomb	Margaret Fuchs / Queen Tera	
1972	Carry On Matron	Jane Darling	
1973	No Sex Please, We're British	Susan	
1973	Carry On Girls	Paula Perkins	
1974	Can You Keep It Up for a Week?	Miss Hampton	
1975	The Ups and Downs of a Handyman	Redhead	
1976	Queen Kong	Queen of the Nabongas	
1977	The Spy Who Loved Me	Hotel Receptionist	
1978	The Wild Geese	Girl Dealer	
1978	Revenge of the Pink Panther	Tanya	
1983	Never Say Never Again	Lady in Bahamas	
2006	Gas	Hooker / Dentist Receptionist	
2006	A Neutral Corner	Flo	
2015	Golden Years	Gilda Parker	
2016	Pitfire of Hell	Margaret	
2018	For the Love of Ella	Tara	
2020	Jeepers Creepers	Fantasy Lover	voice

=== Television ===
Year	Title	Role	Notes
1967	The Saint	Therese	Episode: "To Kill a Saint"
1967	The Baron	Film Actress	Episode: "Countdown"
1968	If There Weren't Any Blacks You'd Have to Invent Them	Senior Nurse	TV film
1968	The Avengers	Betty	Episode: "Whoever Shot Poor George Oblique Stroke XR40?"
1969	Galton and Simpson Comedy	Girl	Episode: "Friends in High Places"
1969	Hark at Barker	Lady on Beach	Episode: "Rustless and the Solar System"
1969	Randall and Hopkirk (Deceased)	Kay	Episode: "That's How Murder Snowballs"
1970	Up Pompeii!	Daili	Episode: "The Senator and the Asp"
1970	The Des O'Connor Show	Various	3 episodes
1971	Misleading Cases	Rowena Stuke	Episode: "The Sitting Bird"
1971	The Persuaders!	Space Queen	Episode: "The Long Goodbye"
1972	The Organization	Prudence	Episode: "Mr Pulman and Mr Pershore"
1972	Scoop	Miss Barton	Episode: "The Stitch Service"
1972	My Wife Next Door	Laura	Episode: "Dream Girl"
1972	Carry On Christmas	Serving Wench	TV film
1973	The Tarbuck Follies	Various	TV film
1973	The Train Now Standing	Brenda	Episode: "A Night to Remember"
1973	Nobody Is Norman Wisdom	Sylvia	Episode: #1.6
1973	Bowler	Miss Ibbotson	Episode: "Bowler's Analysis"
1973	Doctor in Charge	Miss Wedderburn	Episode: "In Place of Strife"
1974	Special Branch	Juanita Wayne	Episode: "Sounds Sinister"
1974	The Jimmy Tarbuck Show	Various	
1975	Space: 1999	Thule Girl	Episode: "Death's Other Dominion"
1976	The Goodies	The Seductress	Episode: "It Might as Well Be String"
1977	Mike Yarwood in Persons	Rose	Episode: #1.4
1977	The Morecambe & Wise Show	Various	Episode: "1977 Christmas Show"
1978	Whodunnit?	Virginia	Episode: "A Dead Cert"
1978	The Kenny Everett Video Cassette	Manicurist	Episode: "#1.1"
1978	Happy Ever After	Fiona	Episode: "The More We Are Together"
1978	Rings on Their Fingers	Cathie	Episode: "Lead Me to the Altar"
1979	Morecambe and Wise at the BBC	Various	Episode: "28 February 1979"
1979	The Dawson Watch	Various	Episode: "The Family"
1980, 1984	Kelly Monteith	Various	2 episodes
1982	Strangers	Jeanette	Episode: "A Swift and Evil Rozzer"
1983	Let There Be Love	Yolanda	Episode: "Spilling the Beans"
1991	Roy's Raiders	Lola Courtney	Episode: #1.4
2006	Last of the Summer Wine	DW Cheetham	Episode: "Who's That Merry Man with Billy, Then?"
2007	The Green Green Grass	Katia's Mother	Episode: "Lust in Translation"

== See also ==
- Michael Mills
- Raquel Welch

== Bibliography ==
- Paul, Louis (2008). "Valerie Leon". Tales From the Cult Film Trenches; Interviews with 36 Actors from Horror, Science Fiction and Exploitation Cinema. Detroit: Wayne State University Press. pp. 164–171. ISBN 978-0-7864-2994-3.
