= All the Way Up (film) =

1970 British film by James MacTaggart

- British quad poster by Tom Chantrell
- Directed by: James MacTaggart
- Screenplay by: Philip Mackie
- Based on: the play Semi-Detached by David Turner
- Produced by: Philip Mackie
- Starring: Warren Mitchell; Pat Heywood; Kenneth Cranham; Richard Briers
- Cinematography: Dick Bush
- Edited by: Roy Watts
- Music by: Howard Blake
- Production companies: EMI Films; Granada Films
- Distributed by: Anglo-Amalgamated (U.K.)
- Release date: June 1970
- Running time: 95 min
- Country: United Kingdom
- Language: English

All The Way Up is a 1970 British comedy film directed by James MacTaggart and starring Warren Mitchell, Pat Heywood, Kenneth Cranham, Richard Briers, Adrienne Posta and Elaine Taylor. It is based on the 1962 play Semi-Detached by David Turner.

It was the sole feature film directorial credit from James MacTaggart, one of the leading drama directors in British television.

The title song was performed by Liverpool group The Scaffold.

== Plot ==
A social climbing father uses everything from poison pen letters to blackmail in order to gain promotion and wealth for his children through marriages.

== Cast ==
- Warren Mitchell as Fred Midway
- Pat Heywood as Hilda Midway
- Elaine Taylor as Eileen Midway
- Kenneth Cranham as Tom Midway
- Vanessa Howard as Avril Hadfield
- Richard Briers as Nigel Hadfield
- Adrienne Posta as Daphne Dunmore
- Bill Fraser as Arnold Makepiece
- Terence Alexander as Bob Chickman
- Maggie Rennie as Mrs. Chickman
- Clifford Parrish as Mr. Hadfield
- Lally Bowers as Mrs. Hadfield
- Frank Thornton as Mr. Driver
- Valerie Leon as Miss Hardwick
- Robin Hunter as Malcolm
- Mary Pratt as Miss Danderfield
- Ernest Hare as Vicar
- George Woodbridge as Landlord
- Michael Robbins as Taxi driver

== Production ==
Writer-producer Philip Mackie mostly worked in television as did director James MacTaggart. Mackie succeeded in getting up the film through Granada Films, a short lived subsidiary of Granada Television. Mackie was appointed managing director of the company which was to make six feature films. However All the Way Up would be the only film from the company.

In November 1969 Nat Cohen announced the film as part of his production slate of 13 films over 18 months for Anglo Amalgamated, who were then owned by EMI, as a co production with Granada Films.

== Critical reception ==
The Monthly Film Bulletin wrote: "Who but the British could present a vision of universal corruption, of a world whose unique moral laws are egotism and treachery, and make a family comedy out of it? Fred Midway pimps for one daughter; his wife counsels the other to get what she wants by withholding conjugal rights from her husband; his son (in an unconscious echo of Godard's Week-End (1967)?) spreads his compliant girl-friend wide-thighed in the road to draw her charms to the attention of a passing tycoon: and we're supposed to laugh, not even af them, but with them. Smirking equally at himself and the audience, Fred Midway is offered us as a kind of contemporary folk hero, a cynical moralist and irrepressible affirmation of the working man's superior guile and lucidity; but emphatically not a revolutionary hero – eager only to excite the envy of his neighbours by ending up with the largest slice of the cake. Warren Mitchell plays him as a slightly smoother version of Alf Garnett; but Garnett is funny because he's shown to be an anachronism and no one else takes him seriously, whereas Midway's meteoric rise makes him uncomfortably more sinister. True, if one can ignore its pernicious premises, the script has its moments of verbose wit ... and both Adrienne Posta and Kenneth Cranham (in a less subtle version of the character he created in Orton's Loot) give impeccably timed and relatively credible performances as the only couple in the film to make love for no economic motive. All the Way Up may have been intended as a biting indictment of the permissive society; in the tasteless event, its moral abdication is far greater than Fred Midway's."

The Observer called it "very funny, uncomfortable, knowing cinema."

The Evening Standard said it was "an extremely funny and savage attack on middle class pretensions."

Variety said "treatment is brisk, spasmodically funny though sometimes overbusy and strident."

Leslie Halliwell said: "Crudely farcical adaptation of a thoughtful comedy of its time; the treatment works in fits and starts but leaves one in no mood for the talkative finale."

Filmink said it was "possibly another Cohen film from this period that was made too late to have impact."

=== Box office ===
According to historian Paul Moody the film's "eventual lack of impact at the box office, in contrast to the On the Buses series that would follow, taught Cohen a valuable lesson in what the British public would pay to see, and this was the last such ‘middle-class’ comedy that EMI would produce."

== Certification ==
The film is rated M in New Zealand for sex scenes and sexual references.
