= Doctor Watson and the Darkwater Hall Mystery =

1974 British TV film by James Cellan Jones

- Genre: Crime; Mystery
- Written by: Kingsley Amis
- Directed by: James Cellan Jones
- Starring: Edward Fox; Elaine Taylor; Christopher Cazenove
- Country of origin: United Kingdom
- Original language: English

Production
- Producer: Mark Shivas
- Running time: 70 minutes

Original release
- Network: BBC
- Release: 27 December 1974

Doctor Watson and the Darkwater Hall Mystery is a 1974 British made-for-television mystery film directed by James Cellan Jones and starring Edward Fox as Doctor Watson.

== Plot ==
While Sherlock Holmes is away on holiday, Watson journeys to Darkwater Hall in the Cotswolds to protect a woman's husband from harm.

== Cast ==
- Edward Fox as Dr. Watson
- Elaine Taylor as Emily
- Christopher Cazenove as Sir Harry
- Jeremy Clyde as Miles
- John Westbrook as Bradshaw
- Terence Bayler as Carlos
- Carmen Gómez as Dolores
- Anthony Langdon as Paul "Black Paul"

== Production ==
Filmed at Stow-on-the-Wold, Watson was portrayed as competent and intelligent as opposed to the popular idea of a bumbling character as Nigel Bruce portrayed him in an earlier series of fourteen films. He is also portrayed as a virile womanizer as the character claims to be in The Sign of the Four.

The film references A Study in Scarlet, "The Adventure of Black Peter", "The Adventure of the Musgrave Ritual" and "The Adventure of the Speckled Band". Fox would go on to play the character of Alistair Ross in another Sherlock Holmes pastiche, The Crucifer of Blood.

== Reception ==
According to author Kingsley Amis, "the reviews were excellent." Alan Barnes calls the film "part-deconstruction, part-parody of Doyle" that "ends up resembling a long drawn-out shaggy dog story."
