= Napoleon and Love =

1974 British television series

- Genre: Historical drama
- Written by: Philip Mackie
- Directed by: Derek Bennett; Reginald Collin; Don Leaver; Jonathan Alwyn
- Starring: Ian Holm; Billie Whitelaw; Peter Bowles; T. P. McKenna
- No. of seasons: 1
- No. of episodes: 9

Production
- Producer: Reginald Collin
- Running time: 60 minutes
- Production company: Thames

Original release
- Network: ITV
- Release: 5 March – 30 April 1974

Napoleon and Love is a 1974 British television series that originally aired on ITV and lasting for 9 episodes from 5 March to 30 April 1974. The series stars Ian Holm in the title role as Napoleon and depicts his relationships with the women who featured in his life as a backdrop to his rise and fall.

== Main cast ==
- Ian Holm as Napoleon
- Billie Whitelaw as Josephine Bonaparte
- Peter Bowles as Murat
- Ronald Hines as Berthier
- Peter Jeffrey as Talleyrand
- T. P. McKenna as Barras
- Sorcha Cusack as Hortense
- Edward de Souza as Joseph Bonaparte
- Wendy Allnutt as Madame Tallien
- Veronica Lang as Madame de Remusat
- John White as Constant
- Tim Curry as Eugene
- Karen Dotrice as Desiree
- Cheryl Kennedy as Pauline
- Nicola Pagett as Georgina
- Stephanie Beacham as Madame Duchatel
- Diana Quick as Eleonore
- Catherine Schell as Marie Walewska
- Susan Wooldridge as Marie-Louise
- Ian Trigger as Raguideau

== Episodes ==
No.	Title	Directed by	Written by	Original release date
1	"Rose"	Reginald Collin	Philip Mackie	5 March 1974
2	"Josephine"	Reginald Collin	Philip Mackie	12 March 1974
3	"Pauline"	Derek Bennett	Philip Mackie	19 March 1974
4	"Georgina"	Don Leaver	Philip Mackie	26 March 1974
5	"Eleonore"	Derek Bennett	Philip Mackie	2 April 1974
6	"Marie Walewska"	Jonathan Alwyn	Philip Mackie	9 April 1974
7	"Maria Luisa"	Derek Bennett	Philip Mackie	16 April 1974
8	"Louise"	Jonathan Alwyn	Philip Mackie	23 April 1974
9	"The End of Love"	Reginald Collin	Philip Mackie	30 April 1974
