= Elaine Taylor (actress) =

English actress (born 1943)

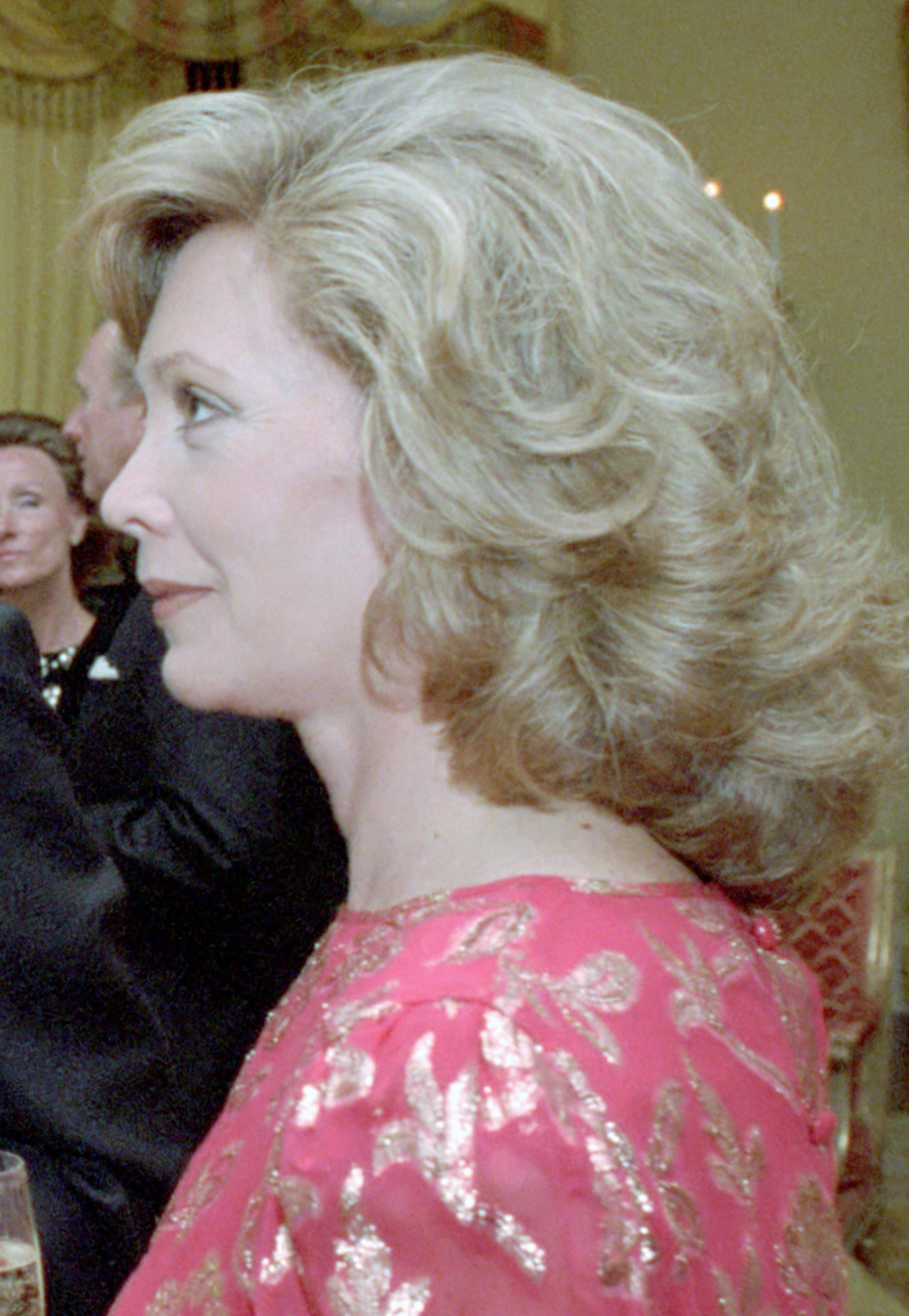
- Taylor in 1985
- Born: Elaine Regina Taylor; 17 October 1943 (age 83); Hemel Hempstead, Hertfordshire, England
- Education: Italia Conti Academy of Theatre Arts
- Occupation: Actress
- Years active: 1950s–1990s
- Spouse: Christopher Plummer (m. 1970; died 2021)
- Relatives: Amanda Plummer (stepdaughter)

Elaine Regina Plummer (née Taylor; born 17 October 1943) is an English former actress, best known as a leading lady in comedy films of the late 1960s and early 1970s. She is the widow of Canadian actor Christopher Plummer, to whom she was married for 50 years.

== Early life ==
Elaine Regina Taylor was born in Hemel Hempstead, Hertfordshire. With the encouragement of her mother, Frances, she took dancing lessons as a child. In 1950, she had her hair styled by hairdresser Raymond Bessone for the part of Will O'the Wisp. Taylor later studied at the Italia Conti Academy of Theatre Arts and joined the London Festival Ballet.

== Career ==
=== Early television and radio roles ===
In the mid-1960s, Taylor appeared in episodes of British television series such as The Benny Hill Show (1965), The Lance Percival Show (1966), in which she sang as well as taking part in comedy sketches, The Old Campaigner (1967), which featured Terry-Thomas as a womanising plastics salesman, and Mr Rose, starring William Mervyn as a retired senior policeman (1968). Her appearance with Benny Hill on 18 December 1965 included a gender-reversal parody of the 1956 film Baby Doll that Hill repeated in 1974 with Diana Darvey. Taylor is thought also to have been the announcer of a sketch in which Hill first performed his song "Those Days" in imitation of Sonny and Cher. She worked again with Hill in the third series of his BBC radio show Benny Hill Time, which started on the Light Programme on 27 February 1966 and featured, among others, Patricia Hayes and Peter Vernon.

=== Transition to film ===
Taylor was cast as a "Bond girl" named Peg co-starring with others such as Jacqueline Bisset, Barbara Bouchet and Alexandra Bastedo in Casino Royale (1967). Also, Taylor played on stage with Tommy Steele in Half a Sixpence and the subsequent1967 film version. Later, she was cast in the role of the "mod" Victoria Ponsonby in the comedy film Diamonds for Breakfast (1968), considered by Leslie Halliwell to be a "yawning comedy caper yarn embellished with sex and slapstick", that also featured Marcello Mastroianni, in his first English language film, and Rita Tushingham. Around the same time, Taylor played Shirley Blair, pregnant fiancée of Tom Taggart (Christian Roberts), in Hammer's adaptation of Bill MacIlwraith's play The Anniversary (also 1968), a "high camp" black comedy starring Bette Davis and Sheila Hancock. Tom Chantrell's famous poster for The Anniversary featured a front-on still of Taylor in brassiere and panties below the slogan (attributed to Davis’ character) "I Spy with my little eye/Something beginning with SEX … and I mean to put a stop to it".

=== Later career ===
Following her appearance as Cloris in the film Lock Up Your Daughters (1969), Taylor appeared in two more films, Michael Winner's The Games and the Warren Mitchell comedy All the Way Up (both 1970). She also starred in an episode of ITC's Jason King ("A Royal Flush", 1972) and The Organization (also 1972) in which she appeared in all seven episodes as secretary Veronica. This was produced by Yorkshire Television and written by Philip Mackie. She was cast in television dramas for the BBC, including Trelawny of the Wells (as Rose Trelawny, 1972) and Kingsley Amis' Doctor Watson and the Darkwater Hall Mystery (as Emily, Lady Fairfax alongside Edward Fox's Dr. Watson, 1974). In the mid-1980s she returned to television in America in The George McKenna Story (1986) and Sharing Richard (1988), and co-produced the 1987 film Love Potion. Taylor's last known appearance was in California-set true-crime television film Till Death Us Do Part (1992).

== Personal life ==
In 1969, Taylor met Christopher Plummer, best known at the time for his role as Captain von Trapp in The Sound of Music (1965), while they were both filming Lock Up Your Daughters in Kilkenny, Ireland. Plummer was almost 14 years older, and twice divorced. He had recently been dating Welsh socialite Elizabeth Rees-Williams, who had lately divorced from Richard Harris. Taylor's usually "mousy" hair, which was tinted red on location, is said to have appealed to Plummer. For her part, Taylor agreed to meet him again in London provided that he reduced his consumption of alcohol.

Taylor and Plummer were married in Montreal, Quebec on 2 October 1970. The officiant, the Reverend Philip Moreton, had married Richard Burton and Elizabeth Taylor in 1964. The two remained married for over 50 years, until Plummer's death in February 2021.

In the 1970s, Plummer and Taylor moved to a rambling English style estate at Weston, Connecticut. Taylor has no children of her own; her stepdaughter is the actress Amanda Plummer (born 1957), Plummer's daughter from his first marriage to Tammy Grimes. A few months after their marriage, Alan Bennett remarked wryly to Kenneth Tynan that Plummer was "his own worst enemy—but only just," while Plummer's own autobiography almost forty years later was entitled In Spite of Myself.

In 2012, Plummer identified "the key to lasting marriage" as "stay[ing] out of each other's hair" and reflected that while he and Taylor quarrelled a lot, they "always end up in laughter which saves the day". More generally, he described Taylor's positive influence on his life:

a combination of Edith Cavell and Julia Child ... a nurse and a cook. I feel guilty sometimes that I denied her a wonderful life, that she's wasted it on some terrible old ham. She could have married a duke or a prince! And she knows it. But being British, you see, she never complains. She's very well trained.

=== Other interests ===
Taylor is a gourmet French cook and she and Plummer renovated or designed houses in West Hollywood, Grasse and London before settling in Weston.
