= Root Into Europe =

- Created by: William Donaldson
- Written by: William Donaldson; Mark Chapman
- Directed by: Mark Chapman
- Starring: George Cole; Pat Heywood
- No. of series: 1
- No. of episodes: 5

Production
- Producers: Mark Chapman; Justin Judd
- Running time: 60mins
- Production company: Aspect Film & TV for Central Independent Television

Original release
- Network: ITV
- Release: 17 May – 14 June 1992

Root Into Europe is an ITV comedy-drama based on the character from William Donaldson's popular book The Henry Root Letters. Five episodes written by Donaldson and Mark Chapman and produced by Aspect Film & TV for Central Independent Television, were first broadcast in May and June 1992. The series starred George Cole as Henry Root, and Pat Heywood as his wife, Muriel.

Henry Root, a fish dealer who disapproves of the impending European Union, declares himself England's 'European regulator' in a letter to the British Prime Minister, then John Major. He takes his wife Muriel on a tour of Europe to represent English values to mainland Europe. His adventures are captured on a camcorder by his wife to be sent to the BBC upon his return for a future documentary, which one expects will never be made. The episodes bring him to France, Spain, Italy, Germany, Belgium and the Netherlands.
