= A Promise of Bed =

1969 British film by Derek Ford

- VHS video artwork
- Directed by: Derek Ford
- Screenplay by: Donald Ford; Derek Ford
- Produced by: Stanley Long
- Starring: Victor Spinetti; Dennis Waterman; John Bird; Vanessa Howard
- Music by: Christos Demetriou; John Kongos
- Production company: Dorak Films
- Distributed by: Miracle
- Release date: 1969
- Running time: 1h 18m
- Country: United Kingdom
- Language: English
- Budget: £8,500

This, That and the Other, originally released as A Promise of Bed, is a 1969 British sex comedy directed by Derek Ford and starring Vanda Hudson, Victor Spinetti and John Bird. It was written by Donald Ford and Derek Ford and comprises a trilogy of separate stories.

== Plot ==
- Story 1. Susan Stress, a sex-crazed actress desperate for a role in a film, lures the producer's son into her apartment by persuading him to take raunchy photographs of her.
- Story 2. George, a depressed loner on the brink of suicide, receives a visit from a young hippy girl, who brings her friends to his apartment after believing it to be the location of a swinging party with a suicide theme.
- Story 3. A lascivious taxi driver takes a mysterious sexy girl to an isolated countryside retreat, and becomes involved in a psychedelic world of bizarre hallucinations.

== Cast ==
- Victor Spinetti as George
- Dennis Waterman as photographer
- John Bird as taxi driver
- Vanessa Howard as Barbara
- Vanda Hudson as Susan Stress
- Gordon Sterne as producer
- Peter Kinsley as Wilbur
- Roy Brannigan as Jeffrey
- Alexandra Bastedo as Angie
- Christopher Mitchell as Carl
- Yutte Stensgaard as taxi girl
- Angela Grant as flower girl
- Valerie Leon as bath girl
- Cleo Goldstein as hands girl

== Critical reception ==
The Monthly Film Bulletin wrote: "A trilogy of slight, titillating sketches, short on comedy but rather better performed than these things usually are. The first story is largely a pretext for Vanda Hudson to appear in diaphanous flimsies, or less; the second, which has black comedy overtones, opens promisingly enough but deteriorates into a dull, drawn-out party scene; and the fantasy finale, with the cabbie continually asking 'What about my fare?' and being regaled by sundry ladies, including bare-breasted swimmers and a stripper covered in black hands which she removes one by one, hardly manages to raise a smile. The one barely memorable moment is provided by Miss Hudson being pursued round an apartment to the strains of the Light Cavalry Overture."
