= Pat Heywood =

Scottish actress (1931–2024)

- Born: Patricia Neville; 1 August 1931; Gretna Green, Scotland
- Died: 26 June 2024 (aged 92)
- Education: Bristol Old Vic Theatre School
- Occupations: Stage and screen actress
- Years active: 1954–1993
- Spouse: Oliver Neville (m. 1964; died 2021)

Patricia Neville (1 August 1931 – 26 June 2024), professionally known as Pat Heywood, was a Scottish character actress who appeared in stage productions, films and television. She was married to Oliver Neville, the former principal of the Royal Academy of Dramatic Art.

== Life and career ==
Heywood was born on 1 August 1931. She was one of five children of engineer John David Heywood. She was educated at the Bristol Old Vic Theatre School, transferring to the theatre company afterwards and appearing in their production of Salad Days as Rowena in 1954. The same year the entire production transferred to the Vaudeville Theatre in London, where it played for five years, a record for a musical at the time.

In 1968, she debuted in film aged 36, as Juliet's nurse in Franco Zeffirelli's Romeo and Juliet, followed by small roles in Staircase (1969) and Battle of Britain (1969). Her next role was as a maid in the psychodrama Mumsy, Nanny, Sonny and Girly (1970) by Freddie Francis. After that film she was seen (often in supporting roles or short appearances) in comedies, thrillers and horror films. Her other film roles include parts in All the Way Up (1970), Whoever Slew Auntie Roo? (1971), 10 Rillington Place (1971, where she played Ethel Christie, the wife of serial killer John Christie), Young Winston (1971, as Winston Churchill's nurse), Bequest to the Nation (1973), Wish You Were Here (1987, as Lynda's aunt Millie), Young Toscanini (1988), Getting It Right (1989), and Franco Zeffirelli's Sparrow (1993).

In 1978, Heywood played Nelly in the BBC's television production of Emily Brontë's Wuthering Heights. She appeared on the television miniseries Root into Europe. She played Dickon's mother in the 1987 Hallmark Hall of Fame version of The Secret Garden. She was also in the Inspector Morse episode "Second Time Around".

Heywood was nominated for BAFTA Award for Best Actress in a Supporting Role for Romeo and Juliet in 1969.

=== Personal life and death ===
In 1964, Heywood married the actor and director Oliver Neville, after meeting him at the Bristol Old Vic. Neville had two children from a previous marriage and Heywood was thenceforth their stepmother. Heywood and Neville did not have any children together.

Neville died in 2021. Heywood died on 26 June 2024, aged 92.

== Filmography ==
=== Film ===
Year	Title	Role	Type
1968	Romeo and Juliet	The Nurse	Feature film
1969	Staircase	Nurse	Feature film
1969	Battle of Britain	WRAF Cpl. Seymour (uncredited)	Feature film
1970	Mumsy, Nanny, Sonny and Girly	Nanny	Feature film
1970	All the Way Up	Hilda Midway	Feature film
1971	10 Rillington Place	Ethel Christie	Feature film
1971	Whoever Slew Auntie Roo?	Dr. Mason	Feature film
1972	Young Winston	Mrs. Everest	Feature film
1973	Bequest to the Nation	Emily	Feature film
1987	Wish You Were Here	Aunt Millie	Feature film
1987	The Secret Garden	Dickon's mother	TV movie
1987	East of Ipswich	Mrs. Burrill	TV movie
1988	Young Toscanini	Madre Allegri	Feature film
1989	Getting It Right	Mrs. Lamb	Feature film
1993	Sparrow	Sister Teresa	Feature film

=== Television ===
Year	Title	Role	Type
1972	Public Eye (episode: "Horse and Carriage")	Lil	TV series
1974	Village Hall (episode: "Distant Islands")	Norma Wellbeloved	TV series
1976	Lucky feller	Mrs Mepstead	TV series
1978	Wuthering Heights	Nelly	TV series
1984	I Thought You'd Gone (TV sitcom)	Alice	TV series
1991	Inspector Morse (episode: "Second Time Around")	Mrs. Mitchell	TV series
1992	Root into Europe	Muriel	TV miniseries
