= Vanessa Howard =

British film actress and singer (1948–2010)

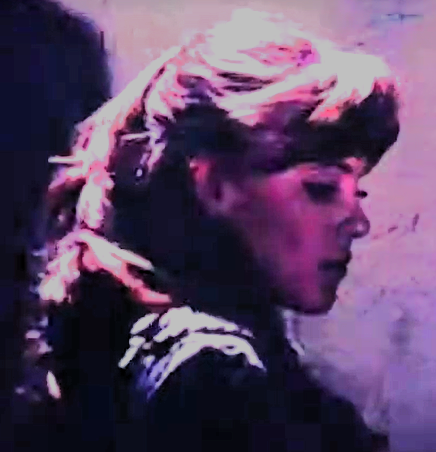
- Howard in The Blood Beast Terror (1968)
- Born: Vanessa Tolhurst; 10 October 1948; Shoreham-by-Sea, Sussex, England
- Died: 23 November 2010 (aged 62); Los Angeles, California, U.S.
- Resting place: Ashes scattered in the Pacific Ocean off the coast of Malibu, California
- Occupations: Actress; singer
- Notable work: Mumsy, Nanny, Sonny and Girly
- Spouse: Robert Chartoff (m. 1970; div. 1983)
- Children: 1

Vanessa Howard (born Vanessa Tolhurst, 10 October 1948, Shoreham-by-Sea, United Kingdom – 23 November 2010), later known as Vanessa Chartoff, was a British film actress and professional backup singer.

== Early life ==
Howard was orphaned by the age of three, after which she and her older sister were adopted. Both girls were performers; Vanessa attended the Phildene Stage School, a co-educational independent school at Chiswick, west London, and her sister attended the Guildhall School of Music and Drama.

== Career ==
After leaving school at fifteen, her first professional job was as a dancer and singer at the Welsh seaside resort of Llandudno, for Clarkson Rose's Twinkle company, in a summer revue. Later engagements included the Players' Theatre, in their Old Time Music Hall, and one year with the George Mitchell Singers as a singer and dancer, leading to TV.

In 1966, Howard appeared in On the Level, a musical in the West End. After, she appeared in The Impossible Years, a play, with David Tomlinson.

Howard made her film debut in the "Swinging Sixties" sex comedy Here We Go Round the Mulberry Bush (1967). Her performance in the film received early praise and was anticipated to become her breakthrough role, with pre-release buzz predicting potential accolades at the 1968 Cannes Film Festival. However, due to the May 68 protests, the movie did not screen. In 1967, on Christmas Day, she appeared in Aladdin, a musical, on British television with Cliff Richard.

Howard later starred in a pair of horror films alongside Peter Cushing, The Blood Beast Terror and Corruption. This led to her casting in Freddie Francis' Mumsy, Nanny, Sonny, and Girly with the anticipation that it could serve to launch a career for Howard as a scream queen. Similarly to Howard's experience with Mulberry Bush, while her performance received critical praise, Girly was quickly pulled from British theaters (along with the thematically similar horror movie Goodbye Gemini) due to a moral panic regarding the movies' depiction of taboo sexual material. Despite performing well in the United States and Canada, Girly was a box office bomb in the United Kingdom.

Despite Girly's domestic failure, Howard's performance caught the attention of executives at Amicus Pictures, who were interested in expanding their horror slate into exploitation movies. Believing Howard could still be a scream queen, they cast her as the villain in What Became of Jack and Jill?, shot in 1970 under the title Romeo and Juliet '71. The final product was much darker than Amicus had anticipated, and they ultimately shelved the movie rather than potentially damage their reputation by releasing it. The film was not released until 1972, by which time Howard's professional struggles, coupled with her recent marriage, had led her to retire from acting; she made one final performance, in an adaptation of The Picture of Dorian Gray, broadcast on British television in 1973.

== Personal life ==
Howard married film producer Robert Chartoff in July 1970; Howard was 21, Chartoff 37. When Howard was 25, they moved to USA, where they raised their son, Charley Chartoff, and 3 children from Robert's first marriage. The couple divorced in 1983. Following her divorce, she worked with California programs dedicated to helping recently divorced homemakers reintegrate into the workforce, including the Mission Valley Regional Occupation Center in Fremont, California. She died in Los Angeles on 23 November 2010, of complications from COPD.

== Recognition ==
An article by UK blogger and film historian Richard Halfhide called In Search of Vanessa Howard was published in 2013 near the one-year anniversary of her death. The article was discovered by American film scholar Preston Fassel, who had concurrently begun researching Howard. A retrospective of Howard's career and later life written by Fassel with the cooperation of her family and Halfhide's assistance appeared in the Spring 2014 issue of the horror journal Screem, addressing multiple rumours about her life, career trajectory, and the time between her retirement and death.

Halfhide continued researching Howard, resulting in his own solo publication in The Dark Side #169, covering Howard's childhood and early career and building upon research he had initially published.

== Filmography ==
- Here We Go Round the Mulberry Bush (1967) – Audrey
- Sam and Janet, 1968, S2E1, with John Junkin, Joan Sims, and Vivienne Martin
- The Blood Beast Terror (1968) – Meg Quennell
- Corruption (1968) – Kate
- This, That and the Other (1969) – Barbara (segment "That")
- Lock Up Your Daughters! (1969) – Hoyden
- Some Girls Do (1969) – Robot Number Seven
- Mumsy, Nanny, Sonny and Girly (1970) – Girly
- All the Way Up (1970) – Avril Hadfield
- The Rise and Rise of Michael Rimmer (1970) – Patricia Cartwright
- What Became of Jack and Jill? (1972) – Jill Standish
- The Picture of Dorian Gray (1973) (TV) – Sybil Vane
