= The Games (film) =

1970 British sports drama film

- Promotional poster
- Directed by: Michael Winner
- Written by: Erich Segal
- Based on: The Games by Hugh Atkinson
- Produced by: Lester Linsk
- Starring: Michael Crawford; Ryan O'Neal; Charles Aznavour; Jeremy Kemp; Elaine Taylor; Sam Elliott; Rafer Johnson; Stanley Baker
- Cinematography: Robert Paynter
- Edited by: Bernard Gribble
- Music by: Francis Lai
- Production company: Twentieth Century-Fox Productions
- Distributed by: 20th Century Fox
- Release date: 9 July 1970 (London)
- Running time: 100 minutes
- Country: United Kingdom
- Language: English
- Budget: $4,895,000

The Games is a 1970 British sports drama film directed by Michael Winner. It is based on the 1968 Hugh Atkinson novel and adapted to the screen by Erich Segal. The plot concerned four marathon competitors at a fictitious Olympic Games in Rome, played by Michael Crawford, Ryan O'Neal, Charles Aznavour and Athol Compton. Elton John recorded one song ("From Denver to L.A.") for the soundtrack.

== Plot ==
American athlete Scott Reynolds, British athlete Harry Hayes, Czechoslovak athlete Pavel Vendek, and Indigenous Australian athlete Sunny Pintubi train for the Rome Olympics marathon.

== Cast ==
- Michael Crawford as Harry Hayes, British competitor
- Ryan O'Neal as Scott Reynolds, American competitor
- Charles Aznavour as Pavel Vendek, Czechoslovak competitor
- Jeremy Kemp as Jim Harcourt
- Elaine Taylor as Christine
- Stanley Baker as Bill Oliver
- Athol Compton as Sunny Pintubi, Australian competitor
- Rafer Johnson, Ron Pickering & Adrian Metcalfe as Commentators
- Kent Smith as Kaverley
- Sam Elliott as Richie Robinson
- Mona Washbourne as Mrs. Hayes
- Reg Lye as Gilmour
- June Jago as Mae Harcourt
- Don Newsome as Cal Wood
- Slim de Grey as Hunt Driver

== Production ==
Athol Compton was an Aboriginal Australian postman who had never acted before being cast in the film.

To simulate vast crowds of people, thousands of life-sized dummies were placed in the seats in Rome's Stadio Olimpico.

== Reception ==
According to Fox records, the film required $7,500,000 in rentals to break even and by 11 December 1970 had made $2,825,000, meaning a loss to the studio.

Howard Thompson of The New York Times declared that "this beautifully scenic and perceptive drama, centering on four marathon contestants at the Rome Olympiad, is a nice antidote for the hot weather. The real star of the picture is Michael Winner, who has directed some previous British exercises with brisk adroitness and stamps this unstartling but engrossing eyeful with the same visual appeal." Arthur D. Murphy of Variety opined that "with the outdated polemics of director Michael Winner, the banalities of Erich Segal's adaptation of a Hugh Atkinson novel, and a rather lifeless and cardboard cast, the 20th-Fox release amounts to a dull Frank Merriwell yarn, hyped a bit to the level of high-school mentality." Gene Siskel of the Chicago Tribune gave the film one-and-a-half stars out of four and wrote, "If Erich Segal's screenplay had its tongue in its cheek, the four stories could be dismissed as comedy of stereotypes." Charles Champlin of the Los Angeles Times wrote that "what strikes you about The Games is what is such beautiful scenery doing in a dumb script like this?" He elaborated that the screenplay contained "almost every cliché known to sports." The Monthly Film Bulletin commented, "A cliché-ridden script with much high-flown dialogue and the kind of flashy shooting one has come to expect from Michael Winner (all staccato cutting and ugly zooms) make it difficult to work up much interest in the fate of the four protagonists of The Games."

== See also ==
- List of films about the sport of athletics
