= The Blood Beast Terror =

1968 British film by Vernon Sewell

- British theatrical release poster
- Directed by: Vernon Sewell
- Written by: Peter Bryan
- Produced by: Arnold L. Miller; Tony Tenser
- Starring: Peter Cushing; Robert Flemyng; Wanda Ventham; Vanessa Howard
- Cinematography: Stanley A. Long
- Edited by: Howard Lanning
- Music by: Paul Ferris
- Production company: Tigon British Film Productions
- Distributed by: Tigon Film Distributors
- Release date: February 1968
- Running time: 88 minutes
- Country: United Kingdom
- Language: English

The Blood Beast Terror (U.S. title: The Vampire-Beast Craves Blood; also known as Blood Beast From Hell and Deathshead Vampire) is a 1968 British horror film directed by Vernon Sewell and starring Peter Cushing, Robert Flemyng and Wanda Ventham. It was written by Peter Bryan. It was released in the UK by Tigon in February 1968, and in the United States by Pacemaker Pictures on a double-bill with Slaughter of the Vampires (1962).

== Plot ==
In 19th century Britain, a series of grisly murders is taking place in the countryside near London. The victims are good-looking young men, between the ages of twenty and thirty and all have had their throats torn open and blood drained. The witness of the latest murder, coachman Joe Trigger, is driven insane when he catches a glimpse of the mysterious killer.

Investigating the deaths are Detective Inspector Quennell of Scotland Yard and his assistant, Sergeant Allan. Because Joe keeps ranting about a horrible winged creature with huge eyes, Quennell hatches a theory that perhaps an eagle is on the loose. At the scene of the latest killing, several large scales are discovered.

The two latest victims were students of the renowned entomology professor Dr Carl Mallinger, who lives nearby with his beautiful daughter Clare and their scar-faced butler, Granger. When Quennell brings the scales to Mallinger for identification, Mallinger behaves suspiciously and tries to take all of them. Quennell describes his theory about a killer eagle, but Mallinger dismisses it outright. Quennell is unaware that the entomologist has a pet eagle, which the sadistic Granger torments.

Explorer and naturalist Frederick Britewell returns from Africa with some moth chrysalids for Dr Mallinger and the handsome young adventurer soon falls victim to Clare, who is the real murderer; Clare is a "were-moth" and transforms at night to drink the blood of young men. Britewell becomes her latest victim after watching her in an amateur horror play performed by some of her father's students (the play is a relatively faithful rendition of the Grand Guignol play "L'Horrible Experience" by Alfred Binet and André de Lorde) but lives long enough to exclaim 'deaths head' to Quennell before he dies. Both Mallinger and Clare claim not to have known Britewell when questioned by Quennell.

Quennell's superior suggests he take a holiday and delegate the case to Sgt Allan, but the Detective Inspector refuses. He reveals his intention to send his daughter Meg to stay with some relatives in Sussex until the investigation is over. As they leave for the railway station, Allan informs Quennell that Dr Mallinger did in fact know Frederick Britewell, prompting Quennell to perform an immediate search of Mallinger's home. He finds that the scientist and his daughter have left for Upper Higham. He also discovers a cellar filled with human bones and Granger's corpse.

Quennell informs his superior he will be taking leave after all: he and Meg go to Upper Higham incognito as a vacationing banker named Thompson and his daughter. There they meet a young insect collector who shows him the proudest exhibit in his collection, a Deathshead moth and Quennell discovers that Mallinger is also incognito as a Dr Miles staying at a nearby estate. Mallinger is attempting to create a male were-moth to be a mate for his increasingly bloodthirsty daughter.

Clare kidnaps a child to provide blood for the male were-moth, which is growing in a cocoon. After this, Mallinger decides to end the experiment, burning the cocoon, which prompts Clare to assume moth form and kill him.

Quennell arrives at Mallinger's house with a police officer and finds Clare in moth form attacking another victim. After Clare flies up to escape the scene, Quennell lights a fire in the garden, prompting her to fly back down into it, where she is consumed by the flames.

== Cast ==
- Peter Cushing as Inspector Quennell
- Robert Flemyng as Dr. Carl Mallinger
- Wanda Ventham as Clare Mallinger / the were-moth
- Vanessa Howard as Meg Quennell
- Glynn Edwards as Sgt. Allan
- William Wilde as Frederick Britewell
- Kevin Stoney as Granger
- David Griffin as William Warrender
- John Paul as Mr. Warrender
- Leslie Anderson as Joe Trigger
- Simon Cain as Clem Withers
- Norman Pitt as police doctor
- Roy Hudd as Smiler
- Russell Napier as landlord
- Robert Cawdron as Chief Constable
- Kenneth Colley as James
- Beryl Cooke as housekeeper

== Production ==
The budget was circa £40,000 and it was the first film to be made under the Tigon British Film Productions banner.

Vernon Sewell said "the idea amused me, and Peter Cushing was a great friend of mine, who I liked very, very much. And, again, I was in complete control, nobody has any – you see I could do what exactly what I damn well liked!" The opening scene, set in Africa, was shot on the River Hamble.

Cushing is said to have considered The Blood Beast Terror to be his worst film.

== Critical reception ==
The Monthly Film Bulletin wrote: "Further adventures in the monsters of 19th century rural England cycle, lamely directed and sloppily scripted. The screenplay is in fact a permutation of a dozen similar efforts (country house laboratory, sinister butler, innocent girl lured into the mad professor's den), padded out with irrelevant interludes and notable only for some startling anachronisms. The monster moth itself might have succumbed to mothballs in the studio props department for all we see of it; and when it does finally make an appearance, it turns out to be a very flimsy creation of sackcloth and coloured stones. Peter Cushing, Robert Flemyng and Wanda Ventham turn in reliable performances, but Vanessa Howard is embarrassingly wooden as the unfortunate Meg. Roy Hudd provides some light relief as a bulbous-eyed morgue attendant, though he is too obviously written into the script to do just that."

Kine Weekly wrote: "This concoction of horrific nonsense has though blood and mystery to please the uncriitic. ...The monster moth is reasonably well suggested and the familiar trappings of mystery are lavishly spread. The identity of the evil-doers is not so well kept, but this is perhaps not so important in a plot where so much is done for effect and so little for good reason. Peter Cushing gives one of his well-known, stealing performances as Inspector Quennel, and Robert Flemyng, as the Professor, and Wanda Ventham, as Clare, lay on the horror faithfully."

British film critic Leslie Halliwell said: "Unpersuasive and totally idiotic cheapjack horror fare. "

The Radio Times Guide to Films gave the film 1/5 stars, writing: "Peter Cushing considered this clumsy chiller as the worst picture he ever made. In many respects he was right. He's the policeman investigating vampiristic murders carried out by a giant death's-head moth masquerading as the 'daughter' of a renowned Victorian entomologist. It must have seemed a good idea at the time."
