= The Organization (TV series) =

1972 British TV drama series

- Genre: Drama
- Written by: Philip Mackie
- Starring: Peter Egan; Bernard Hepton; Donald Sinden; Anton Rodgers
- Country of origin: United Kingdom
- Original language: English
- No. of series: 1
- No. of episodes: 7

Production
- Producer: Peter Willes
- Production company: Yorkshire

Original release
- Network: ITV
- Release: 16 April – 28 May 1972

The Organization is a British television drama series, produced by Yorkshire Television for the ITV network in 1972.

The series, written by Philip Mackie, was set in the offices of the fictional Greatrick Organization, a faceless multi-million pound corporation dedicated solely to profits and more profits.

Peter Egan starred as new junior executive Richard Pershore, struggling to navigate his way through the corporate minefield, surrounded by more experienced and ambitious players. Through the course of seven episodes, The Organization features all the executive members of the public relations team at Greatrick. The series was repeated on Channel 4 in 1987

== Cast ==
- Peter Egan as Richard Pershore
- Anton Rodgers as Peter Frame
- Donald Sinden as David Pulman
- Bernard Hepton as Rodney Spurling
- Elaine Taylor as Veronica
- Jill Melford as Eve Manship
- Norman Bird as Ken Grist

== Episodes ==
No.	Title	Directed by	Written by	Original release date
1	"Mr Pershore and Ken Grist"	James Ormerod	Philip Mackie	16 April 1972
2	"Ken Grist and Eve"	Christopher Hodson	Philip Mackie	23 April 1972
3	"Eve and Rodney Spurling"	James Ormerod	Philip Mackie	30 April 1972
4	"Rodney Spurling and Peter Frame"	Christopher Hodson	Philip Mackie	7 May 1972
5	"Peter Frame and Veronica"	James Ormerod	Philip Mackie	14 May 1972
6	"Veronica and Mr Pulman"	Christopher Hodson	Philip Mackie	21 May 1972
7	"Mr Pulman and Mr Pershore"	James Ormerod	Philip Mackie	28 May 1972

== Home media ==
The Organization is available on DVD in the UK.
