= Hai Karate =

Line of men's aftershave and cologne

Hai Karate fragrance
- 1969 Advertisement

Hai Karate was a budget aftershave and cologne for men that was sold in the United States and the United Kingdom from the 1960s to the 1980s. It was reintroduced in the U.K., under official licence, in late 2014 and was reintroduced again in 2021.

== History ==
The fragrance was originally developed by the Leeming division of Pfizer and launched in 1967 with the catchphrase "Be careful how you use it." Hai Karate was priced higher than Old Spice, Aqua Velva, and Mennen Skin Bracer, but lower than Jade East and English Leather. Other fragrances were soon introduced named Oriental Lime and Oriental Spice. Hai Karate was reintroduced in the UK in 2014 by Healthpoint Ltd, following the brand's original formulation but using a different bottle packaging. Reintroduced to UK and EU by Beauty Clear in 2021.

== Marketing ==
Hai Karate was known for its humorous television and magazine ads, which included self-defense instructions to help wearers "fend off women", The brand's marketing plan was developed at the advertising firm of McCaffrey & McCall by George Newall, who gained fame as the co-producer of, as well as writing a few songs for Schoolhouse Rock! The advertisements were considered humorous as they played to a "male fantasy of a world where women find them irresistible." From 1969 to 1976, Bond girl Valerie Leon played the woman driven wild by a man wearing Hai Karate aftershave in a highly successful series of British commercials for the product. Leon parodied her Hai Karate ad campaign role in The Goodies episode "It Might as Well Be String" by attacking Tim Brooke-Taylor.
