= Jungle Street =

1960 British film by Charles Saunders

- Original UK theatrical release poster
- Directed by: Charles Saunders
- Screenplay by: Alexander Doré
- Story by: Guido Coen
- Produced by: Guido Coen
- Starring: David McCallum; Kenneth Cope; Jill Ireland
- Cinematography: Walter J. Harvey
- Edited by: Peter Bezencenet
- Music by: Harold Geller
- Production company: Theatrecraft
- Distributed by: Regal Films
- Release date: 19 November 1961
- Running time: 89 minutes
- Country: United Kingdom
- Language: English

Jungle Street, released in the U.S. as Jungle Street Girls, is a 1961 black-and-white second feature British crime drama directed by Charles Saunders and starring David McCallum, Kenneth Cope and Jill Ireland. The screenplay was written by Alexander Doré from a story by Guido Coen. It was the first of three films produced by the Theatrecraft production company in the early 1960s along with Dangerous Afternoon (1961) and Strongroom (1962).

== Plot ==
A #12 double-decker bus headed for Harlesden drives through London and stops in Shepherd's Bush. An elderly man disembarks and is mugged by a young man in an alley. At the Adam and Eve Club, where girls perform erotic dances on stage, club lobby car mechanic and petty criminal Terry Collins speaks with Joe Lucas at the outer bar and asks to see the owner, gangster Jacko Fielding, who is with his main girl, Sue. Julie the hatcheck girl brings the evening's takings and Terry eyes them greedily. In the club, Terry watches Sue strip for an audience mainly composed of old men and lights a cigarette at the bar. Terry is obsessed with Sue but is unable to pursue her openly because the wealthy and powerful Jacko is interested in her.

At Terry's working-class home, he bickers with his parents over breakfast, belittling his father and his beer drinking. The morning Daily Express paper informs Terry that he killed his victim, the old man from the bus. His mother sees the headline and hopes that the authorities will hang the murderer. At the police station, two detectives interview Joe, who says that he spent the night with Dimples, one of the dancers at the club. The police think that the murder is connected to the club and ask about all of the men there.

Johnny Calvert appears at Terry's mother's house looking for Terry, who is not home, but she invites him in and they chat. The police spot Johnny and check him since he has been in prison for robbery. Joe confronts Terry in the club and hints that he knows that Terry is the murderer, and Terry punches him. The girls appear and Terry remains in a foul mood. The bouncer knocks unconscious and Sue tends to him backstage. After stealing a kiss, he is ejected from the club.

At the Star Garage where Terry works, the police wait inside and Johnny sits opposite in a cafe. He is interviewed by Sergeant Philip and is asked about an Austin A40 and he denies knowing Johnny. The newspaper writes that the police have the wallet and that they intend to fingerprint everyone in the district. Terry finds Johnny in a rented room over a tailor's shop and apologises for spending Johnny's share of the robbery, but he suggests that they rob the Adam and Eve Club. He tells Johnny that Sue (Johnny's old girlfriend) is working there as a stripper; she had been forced to strip for money when Johnny was sent to prison. They go to the club together, and Jacko invites Terry into the back office. Johnny walks backstage and finds Sue in her dressing room and slaps her. She claims to have been true to him since he departed and they kiss. Jacko is interviewing a new girl while Terry relaxes with a drink and eyes the safe. Terry and Johnny reunite at the club bar. Johnny leaves and Joe threatens to blackmail Terry. He is surprised after asking for £10 that Terry offers him £50. Sue visits Johnny in his room and asks him to "take her away" as she lies on the bed.

The police start door-to-door fingerprinting and are told to record the names of those who refuse. Terry and Johnny seize upon the caretaker to gain entrance to the club office, where they blow the safe. Terry double-crosses Johnny by knocking him unconscious and absconding with the money, just as the caretaker triggers an alarm, alerting the police. Johnny is caught and tells the police that Terry is his accomplice. Terry rushes to Johnny's flat, where Sue is waiting, and tries to convince her to flee with him. When she resists, demanding to know what happened to Johnny, Terry tries to abduct her at gunpoint. The police arrive and Terry takes Sue and Mr. Rose, the elderly tailor who occupies the flat next door, as hostages in a standoff. Mr. Rose tries to persuade Terry to surrender his gun. The police burst through the door and cause Terry to accidentally fatally shoot Mr. Rose. Terry is dragged away screaming by police as Mr. Rose dies in Sue's arms.

== Cast ==
- David McCallum as Terry Collins
- Kenneth Cope as Johnny Calvert
- Jill Ireland as Sue
- Brian Weske as Joe Lucas
- Vanda Hudson as Lucy Bell
- Edna Doré as Mrs. Collins
- Thomas Gallagher as Mr. Collins
- Howard Pays as Sergeant Pelling
- Joy Webster as Rene
- Martin Sterndale as Inspector Bowen
- John Chandos as Jacko Fielding
- Meier Tzelniker as Mr. Rose the tailor
- Larry Burns as barman
- Fred Griffiths as Dealer (Dealo) the bouncer
- Julie Shearing as Julie the cashier
- Faye Craig as native dancer
- Anne Scott as Margo
- Gillian Watt as dancing girl
- Alfred Farrell as Mr. Burns
- Jacqueline Jones as Dolly
- William Wilde as Sid Porter
- Howard Douglas as Old Bill
- Richard McNeff as policeman
- Marian Collins as announcer
- Shirley Anne Field as Jaqui

== Production ==
Jungle Street was one of the last films directed by Charles Saunders. According to producer Guido Coen, David McCallum had "substantial input" into the direction of the film. Critic Michael J. Weldon has called it the last of McCallum's "juvenile delinquent" film roles. McCallum and Ireland were married at the time when the film was made.

Despite its setting in a strip club, the film received an "A" rating from the British Board of Film Classification after removing some material, including shortening two striptease scenes and deleting a back view of Jill Ireland baring her breasts to the club audience.

The film, retitled Jungle Street Girls, was later released and promoted as an adults-only film in the United States by Ajay Films.

== Reception ==
The Monthly Film Bulletin wrote: "Dreary second feature, with a number of amateurish striptease acts dispiritingly presented to eke out a feeble, formulary plot. As an exercise in crime and punishment, it has neither point nor moral force."

Chibnall and McFarlane in The British 'B' Film wrote that the film "remains a piece that is wonderfully evocative of the era."

In the book Sixties British Cinema, Robert Murphy wrote: "Without wishing to deny the film's flaws, its exploration of a grimy world of shortened horizons and stunted development which affluence has touched in only the most superficial way is fascinating. And its young protagonists, David McCallum, Kenneth Cope, Jill Ireland – fragile, brutal, vulnerable, rebellious – are disturbingly true to life."

== Home video ==
Jungle Street was released on DVD by Odeon Entertainment in 2008 in a set with the British crime drama A Matter of Choice (1963).
