= Robert Chartoff =

American producer

- Chartoff in 2003
- Born: Robert Irwin Chartoff; August 26, 1933; New York City, U.S.
- Died: June 10, 2015 (aged 81); Santa Monica, California, U.S.
- Education: Union College (BA); Columbia University Law School (JD)
- Occupation: Film producer
- Years active: 1967–2015
- Spouse(s): Phyllis Raphael (m. ??; div. ??) Vanessa Howard (m. 1970; div. 1983) Jenny Weyman (m. 1992)
- Children: 5

Robert Irwin Chartoff (August 26, 1933 – June 10, 2015) was an American film producer and philanthropist.

== Early life and education ==
Chartoff was born on August 26, 1933, in New York City, the son of Bessie and William Chartoff. His family was Jewish. He graduated from Union College in 1955, followed by Columbia University Law School.

== Career ==
Chartoff produced more than 30 movies, including the Rocky film series. He and fellow producer Irwin Winkler won an Academy Award for Best Picture for its 1976 debut installment, Rocky.

== Philanthropy ==
Chartoff established the RC Charitable Foundation in 1990 to award grants to international schools and other child agencies. He served as its President. The RC Charitable Foundation gives grants awards to the Buddha Educational Trust. He served on the Community Advisory Board of the Younes and Soraya Israel Studies Center at UCLA.

== Personal life ==
Chartoff's first wife was Phyllis Raphael, with whom he had three children – Jenifer, William and Julie – before divorcing. In 1970, he married British actress Vanessa Howard, with whom he had one son, Charley. That marriage also ended in divorce. He last married Jenny Weyman, with whom he had one daughter, Miranda. He died at his home in Santa Monica, California, in 2015 from pancreatic cancer, leaving a widow.

== Filmography ==
He was a producer in all films unless otherwise noted.

Year	Film	Credit	Notes
1967	Point Blank		
1968	The Split		
1969	They Shoot Horses, Don't They?		
1970	Leo the Last		
1970	The Strawberry Statement		
1971	Believe in Me		
1971	The Gang That Couldn't Shoot Straight		
1972	The New Centurions		
1972	Thumb Tripping		
1972	The Mechanic		
1972	Up the Sandbox		
1974	Busting		
1974	S*P*Y*S		
1974	The Gambler		
1975	Breakout		
1975	Peeper		
1976	Rocky		
1976	Nickelodeon		
1977	New York, New York		
1977	Valentino	Executive producer	
1978	Comes a Horseman	Executive producer	
1978	Uncle Joe Shannon		
1979	Rocky II		
1980	Raging Bull		
1981	True Confessions		
1982	Rocky III		
1983	The Right Stuff		
1985	Beer		
1985	Rocky IV		
1990	Rocky V		
1992	Straight Talk		
2004	In My Country		
2006	Rocky Balboa	Executive producer	
2010	The Tempest		
2011	The Mechanic	Executive producer	
2013	Ender's Game		
2014	A Midsummer Night's Dream	Executive producer	
2014	The Gambler		
2015	Creed		Final film

Thanks

Year	Film	Role
2015	Creed	In memory of
