= Athol Compton =

Australian actor

- Born: 1951 (age 74–75)
- Occupation: Actor
- Known for: The Games (1970)
- Notable work: The Last Wave (1977), BabaKiueria (1986)

Athol Compton (born 1951) is an Aboriginal Australian actor. He became internationally famous when cast in The Games (1970).

== Select credits ==
- Skippy episode "The Rainmakers"
- The Games (1970)
- Delta episode "Blackout"(1970)
- Homicide episode "Flash Johnny" (1970)
- Pig in a Poke episode "Ray's Story" (1977)
- The Last Wave (1977)
- The Timeless Land (1980)
- A Country Practice (1984) episodes 1 & 2 "An Axe to Grind"
- Short Changed (1986)
- BabaKiueria (1986)
- Flight into Hell (1987)
