= Michael Mills (British producer) =

British producer and director (1919–1988)

- Born: 13 May 1919; Prestwich, Lancashire, (now Greater Manchester), England
- Died: 7 January 1988 (aged 68); Gillingham, Kent, England
- Occupations: Television producer, director
- Years active: 1947–1986
- Known for: Some Mothers Do 'Ave 'Em
- Notable work: Head of comedy at the BBC (1967–1972), producer at Thames Television
- Spouse: Valerie Leon (m. 1974)
- Children: 2

Michael Mills (13 May 1919 – 7 January 1988) was an English television producer and director who served as the BBC's Head of Comedy from 1967 until 1972.

== Early life and career ==
Mills was born in Prestwich, Lancashire (now part of Greater Manchester), England. He joined the BBC before the Second World War as a sound effects operator, and served in the Free French Navy (on secondment from the Royal Navy) during hostilities, where he undertook revue-type shows.

In 1947, he returned to the BBC, as a light entertainment producer. Yvonne Littlewood, at the time his personal assistant, recalled one live production of the three act Vivian Ellis musical Jill Darling in February 1949 which used both studios at Alexandra Palace, the set being changed in one while the second act was being broadcast.

Mills served as the BBC's Head of Comedy from 1967 to 1972. According to creator Jimmy Perry, it was Mills who in 1968 suggested that a forthcoming series should be titled Dad's Army instead of The Fighting Tigers, and that John Le Mesurier should play the Sergeant and Clive Dunn, Corporal Jones. Mills thought Frankie Howerd's role in the British stage production of A Funny Thing Happened on the Way to the Forum could be the basis for a series. This became Up Pompeii! (1969–70). Mills was also responsible for commissioning the sitcom The Liver Birds in 1969.

While the first series of Monty Python's Flying Circus (1969) was still being transmitted, he wrote to John Cleese: "The shows seem to be getting better and better and this is a view shared by most people who see it." Offering him a role in the second series, Mills had been told by Barry Took that Cleese was unsure about continuing: "I do hope you will be able to take part both as a writer and performer because the show would lose a great deal if you are not one of them."

== Last years ==
Mills was the original producer of television series Some Mothers Do 'Ave 'Em (1973–1975), and briefly supervised Wodehouse Playhouse (1976). He joined Thames Television around this time, where he remained for the rest of his career. At Thames, he was responsible for the production of such series as Get Some In! (1975–1978) and Chance in a Million (1984-1986).

== Personal life ==
From 1974 until his death, Mills was married to the actress Valerie Leon. The couple had two children; a son, Leon, and daughter Merope Mills, who has worked for The Guardian newspaper.

Michael Mills died in Gillingham, Kent, in 1988.
