= Edward Atienza =

British actor (1924–2014)

- Born: 27 January 1924; London, England
- Died: 16 September 2014 (aged 90); Stratford, Ontario
- Education: London Academy of Music and Dramatic Art
- Known for: Stage and Film actor

Edward Atienza (27 January 1924 – 16 September 2014) was a British stage and film actor. He made his first London theatre appearance in the role of Mole in Toad of Toad Hall at the Prince's Theatre.

== Biography ==
Edward Atienza was born in 1924, in London. His parents were Alvaro Atienza and Dulce Atienza (née Laws). He attended the Sutton Valence School and King's College London. Atienza trained for the stage at the London Academy of Music and Dramatic Art.

== Stage work ==
Atienza made his professional stage debut in the role of the Butler in a 1949 production of Up in Mabel's Room. He went on to appear with the Shakespeare Memorial Theatre Company from 1950 to 1954. Atienza made his first appearance in London theatre in the role of Mole in Toad of Toad Hall at the Prince's Theatre in December 1954. In 1956, Atienza appeared in a musical version of Shakespeare's The Comedy of Errors. Atienza made his Broadway debut in a 1957 production of Romanoff and Juliet at the Plymouth Theatre. Atienza also appeared in productions of Macbeth and Romeo and Juliet on Broadway. He also was in the 1962 Broadway play The Affair. British theatres at which Atienza has appeared include the Queen's Theatre, the Mermaid Theatre, and the Chichester Festival Theatre. He made numerous appearances at Canada's Stratford Festival.

== Film work ==
Atienza made his film debut in the 1956 film The Battle of the River Plate. Other films he has appeared in include Sword of Freedom in 1957, the 1961 film adaptation of Romanoff and Juliet, Lock Up Your Daughters in 1969, and Sarah in 1976. He was nominated for 1997 Gemini Award for Best Performance by an Actor in a Guest Role in a Dramatic Series for his performance on Taking the Falls.

== Filmography ==
Year	Title	Role	Notes
1956	The Battle of the River Plate	Pop	
1959	One Step Beyond – Doomsday (TV)	Doctor	Season 2, Episode 4, 13 October 1959
1961	Romanoff and Juliet	Patriarch	
1961	The Sinister Man	Clerk	
1969	Lock Up Your Daughters	Mr. Justice Worthy	
1971	Say Hello to Yesterday	Porter	
1991	When the Fire Burns	Manuel de Falla	Voice, (final film role)
