= Lock Up Your Daughters (1969 film) =

1969 British film by Peter Coe

- Original British quad poster
- Directed by: Peter Coe
- Written by: Bernard Miles; Willis Hall; Keith Waterhouse
- Based on: musical Lock Up Your Daughters based on play Rape upon Rapeby Henry Fielding adapted by Bernard Miles music by Laurie Johnson lyrics by Lionel Bart
- Produced by: David Deutsch
- Starring: Christopher Plummer; Susannah York; Glynis Johns; Ian Bannen
- Cinematography: Peter Suschitzky
- Edited by: Frank Clarke
- Music by: Ron Grainer
- Color process: Technicolor
- Production company: Domino Films
- Distributed by: Columbia Pictures (UK & US)
- Release dates: 30 March 1969 (London); 15 October 1969 (New York City); 21 October 1969 (United States)
- Running time: 102 minutes
- Country: United Kingdom
- Language: English
- Budget: £878,986

Lock Up Your Daughters! is a 1969 British comedy film directed by Peter Coe and starring Christopher Plummer, Susannah York and Glynis Johns. It is an adaptation of the 1959 stage musical of the same name set in 18th-century Britain, which in turn is based on the 1730 comedy, Rape upon Rape, by Henry Fielding It lacks all the songs from the original stage production. It was one of a number of British costume films released in the wake of the success of the Tom Jones (1963).

== Plot ==
A bawdy yarn concerning three sex-starved sailors on leave and on the rampage in a British town.

== Cast ==
- Christopher Plummer as Lord Foppington
- Susannah York as Hilaret
- Glynis Johns as Mrs. Squeezum
- Ian Bannen as Ramble
- Tom Bell as Shaftoe
- Elaine Taylor as Cloris
- Jim Dale as Lusty
- Kathleen Harrison as Lady Clumsey
- Roy Kinnear as Sir Tunbelly Clumsey
- Georgia Brown as Nell
- Vanessa Howard as Hoyden
- Roy Dotrice as Gossip
- Fenella Fielding as Lady Eager
- Paul Dawkins as Lord Eager
- Peter Bayliss as Mr. Justice Squeezum
- Richard Wordsworth as coupler
- Peter Bull as Bull
- Wallas Eaton as Staff (credited as "Wallace Eaton")
- Trevor Ray as Quill
- Blake Butler as Faithful
- Arthur Mullard as Night Watchman
- Edward Atienza as Mr. Justice Worthy
- Patricia Routledge as nurse
- Roy Pember as Bottle
- Fred Emney as Earl of Ware
- John Morley as nobleman
- Tony Sympson as Clerk of the Court
- Michael Darbyshire as La Verole
- Clive Morton as Bowsell
- Roger Hammond as Johnsonian Figure

== Production ==
The musical ran for four years in England but never had a major production in the US. It had a run at the Pasadena Playhouse in 1967.

The movie was going to be made by Nat Cohen at Anglo Amalgamated but was eventually done by Columbia. It was Christopher Plummer's first musical since The Sound of Music (1965). Filming started in Ireland in March 1968.

== Reception ==
The Monthly Film Bulletin wrote: "A lively cast, impeccable production values (notably Peter Suschitzky's camerawork and Alan Barrett's costumes) and confident direction contribute to an entertainment in the tradition of Tom Jones, with the raffish Restoration world of rakes and doxies, beggars and rogues, social-climbing tradesmen and deceitful ladies, depicted with bawdy zest. ... Susannah York is excellent as the tomboyish Hilaret, while Jan Bannen, Tom Bell and Jim Dale provide clearly contrasted portraits of masculine frustration. But it is the riper roles which provide the best opportunities: Christopher Plummer as the ineffable Foppington, all towering wigs, ribbons and painted Cupid's bows; Fenella Fielding as Lady Eager, whimpering scarcely audible cries for help when about to be boarded in her bedroom; Fred Emney as a chairborne nobleman whose insolent demand for right of way provokes a magnificent battle with wet codfish."

In his review in The New York Times, Roger Greenspun wrote: "...a three-strand plot that has been so smothered in atmosphere, activity and authenticity that even the great traditions of theatrical untruth cannot breathe life into it. The production values of Lock Up Your Daughters! are ambitious enough to fill three movies, but they are not sufficient to substitute for one."
