= The Rise and Rise of Michael Rimmer =

1970 British film by Kevin Billington

- Theatrical release poster
- Directed by: Kevin Billington
- Written by: Peter Cook; John Cleese; Graham Chapman; Kevin Billington
- Produced by: Tommy Thompson
- Starring: Peter Cook; Vanessa Howard; John Cleese; Harold Pinter; Arthur Lowe
- Cinematography: Alex Thomson
- Music by: John Cameron
- Production companies: David Paradine Productions; London Weekend Television
- Distributed by: Warner-Pathé Distributors
- Release date: 12 November 1970; (United Kingdom)
- Running time: 100 minutes
- Country: United Kingdom
- Language: English

The Rise and Rise of Michael Rimmer is a 1970 British satirical film directed by Kevin Billington, and starring Peter Cook, Vanessa Howard and John Cleese. It was co-written by Cook, Cleese, Graham Chapman and Billington. The film was devised and produced by David Frost under the pseudonym "David Paradine".

The film satirised the growing influence of PR, spin and opinion polls in British politics, as well as parodying political figures of the time such as Harold Wilson and Enoch Powell.

== Plot ==
The mysterious Michael Rimmer appears at a small and ailing British advertising agency, where the employees assume he is working on a time and motion study. However, he quickly begins to assert a de facto authority over the firm's mostly ineffectual staff and soon acquires control of the business from the incompetent boss Ferret. Rimmer then succeeds in establishing the newly invigorated firm as the country's leading polling agency, and begins to make regular TV appearances as a polling expert. He subsequently moves into politics, acting as an adviser to the leader of the Tory opposition, Tom Hutchinson. After arranging for the Shadow Home Secretary Sir Eric Bentley to give an inflammatory anti-immigration speech to give Hutchinson a pretext for firing him and to demonstrate the Conservatives' opposition to immigration without any policies, Rimmer becomes the MP for Bentley's vacant seat of Budleigh Moor (a reference to Cook's frequent collaborator, Dudley Moore). Along the way, he acquires a trophy wife.

Relying on a combination of charisma and deception—and murder—he then rapidly works his way up the political ladder to become prime minister (after throwing his predecessor off an oil rig). Rimmer introduces direct democracy by holding endless referendums on trivial or complex matters via postal voting and televoting, which generates so much voter apathy that the populace protests against the reform. Having introduced direct democracy in a bid to gain ultimate power, Rimmer holds a last vote to 'streamline government', which would give him dictatorial powers; with the populace exhausted, the proposal passes. Ferret attempts to assassinate Rimmer as he and his wife ride through the capital in an open-topped convertible but fails and falls to his death.

== Cast ==
- Peter Cook as Michael Rimmer
- Denholm Elliott as Peter Niss
- Ronald Fraser as Tom Hutchinson
- Vanessa Howard as Patricia Cartwright
- Arthur Lowe as "Ferret"
- George A. Cooper as "Blacket"
- Harold Pinter as Steven Hench
- James Cossins as Crodder
- Roland Culver as Sir Eric Bentley
- Dudley Foster as Federman
- Dennis Price as Fairburn
- Ronnie Corbett as Interviewer
- John Cleese as Pumer
- Diana Coupland as Mrs. Spimm
- Michael Bates as Mr. Spimm
- Graham Chapman as Fromage
- Valerie Leon as Tanya
- Percy Edwards as Bird Impersonator
- Ann Beach as Receptionist (Yvonne)
- Zakes Mokae as Mugger (uncredited)

== Production ==
The concept of the film was devised by David Frost in 1967, and the first draft of the screenplay was then co-written by Cleese and Chapman, during a three-month sabbatical in Ibiza. Cook was lined up to star, but it took another two years before funding could be secured. It was the third of three films Cook was contracted to make for Columbia, the previous two being The Wrong Box and A Dandy in Aspic.

Cook, Cleese, Chapman and director Kevin Billington jointly reworked the script prior to filming, and Cook reportedly made a strong contribution to the final script. It was produced during 1969, and the team hoped it would maximise its topicality with a release prior to the forthcoming UK general elections (the result of which it in fact predicted). However, the studio feared that it might become a source of controversy, so the film was held back until November 1970, almost a year after the election, thus losing most of its topical 'punch'.

The film is also notable for its distinguished cast of well-known British comedy and character actors, including Cleese and Chapman, Denholm Elliott, Arthur Lowe, Dennis Price, Ronald Fraser, Michael Trubshawe, Julian Glover, Michael Bates, and cameos by Ronnie Corbett and renowned stage and screenwriter Harold Pinter. The film also reunited Corbett, Cleese, Chapman and Frost, all of whom had worked extensively together during the 1960s on That Was The Week That Was and The Frost Report (although only Cleese appears with Corbett on screen).

The story satirises many well-known British political figures including Harold Wilson, Edward Heath, and Enoch Powell, and although the resemblances were played down at the time of the film's release, Cook later admitted that the title character of Rimmer was heavily based on David Frost himself. Like Frost, Rimmer effectively appears from nowhere, "rises without trace" (the famous phrase coined by Jonathan Miller to describe Frost's ascent to prominence) and becomes one of the most influential people in the country. The imitation even extended to Cook copying Frost's standard greeting of the time, "Super to see you", and the coincidental fact that the set of Rimmer's living room was almost identical to Frost's real living room, even though the designer had never seen it.

Alongside the more overt satire and parodies of prominent public figures, the movie also includes numerous hidden jokes and visual gags. For example, in the scene in which Arthur Lowe gropes his secretary's legs as she stands in front of a shelf, the spine of one of the folders on the shelf is clearly marked with a swastika. In Harold Pinter's cameo appearance as fictional TV host Steven Hench, the initials of his show's title, "Steven Hench is Talking To You" spell S-H-I-T-T-Y. Most obvious is that of the surname, Rimmer, which is a slang term for someone who engages in oral intercourse with the anus, i.e., an arselicker.

Cook admitted later that he had partly based his portrayal of the Rimmer character on David Frost, who provided funding for the film and took an executive producer credit.

The commercial and critical failure of the movie, which did not receive an American release, effectively dashed Cook's hopes of establishing himself as a solo screen star; although he appeared in many more film and TV projects, he only co-starred (with Dudley Moore) in one other film, and Rimmer proved to be his only solo starring film role.

== Release ==
The film had its world premiere on 12 November 1970 as the first film at the newly opened Warner Rendezvous in Leicester Square, London.

== Critical reception ==
The Monthly Film Bulletin wrote:

The Rise and Rise of Michael Rimmer is a very damp squib after the fireworks of all that mid-Sixties television knocking of public images. Television is still the influence, though, since the film is no more than the sum of a series of disjointed television-style sketches, most of which would have been better left on paper. The targets here are as predictable as the jokes are laboured: Tory women all wear hats, army officers are comic buffoons, public opinion polls tell you what you want them to tell you. ... Significantly, the few moderately good jokes (John Cleese practising ballroom dancing during his tea-break, the sabotage of the religious opinion poll) are the incidental ones, the jokes not geared to the message. The rest is an unhappy mess, sloppily scripted and – for a director whose television documentaries were so finely tuned – surprisingly sloppily assembled. Peter Cook's performance as Rimmer is as bland and plastic as the character, and most of the other familiar faces (Denholm Elliott in particular) are left uncomfortably stranded in the debris of misfiring jokes. As for what seems to be the message – politicians as unscrupulous manipulators of a gullible electorate – it's long since ceased to be a joke.

Kine Weekly wrote: "Considering names in the production team and the cast it is not surprising that this film has an affinity of style with Beyond the Fringe and Monty Python's Flying Circus. A fault lies in the fact that quick-fire sketches do not easily adapt to a full length story. Some of the earlier absurdities are very amusing particularly in the case of Arthur Lowe, as Ferret, but the story becomes progressively less funny and inventive when it enters politics ...Peter Cook plays the part of Rimmer with a bright eye, an enigmatic smile and little else."

Variety wrote: "Though Cook plays it gently, he is most effective. ... It's a pity that Frost's first effort did not get away rather more from the expected image, but it's still a bright entertainment. Kevin Billington's direction is sometimes not acid enough for the situations but he, with Cook, John Cleese and Graham Chapman, have built up a screenplay that has wit and ideas."

Revisiting the film in 2007, William Cook wrote in The Guardian: "Anyone can make a bad film ... but to make a turkey requires talent and finesse. ... Unlike mediocre films, they usually improve with age. The Rise & Rise Of Michael Rimmer is a perfect example of this genre. Like all prize turkeys, it had all the ingredients of a great movie, including the participation of one of Britain's greatest comedians, Peter Cook. ... With appearances by bright young things like Cleese and Chapman, plus old troopers like Arthur Lowe and Denholm Elliott, The Rise & Rise Of Michael Rimmer could hardly have had a better pedigree. It even boasted a cameo by Harold Pinter. So where did it all go wrong? Well, delaying its release until after the general election hardly helped. ... Cook's acting was as wooden as a flat-pack wardrobe, as he subsequently admitted in a typically self-effacing interview."
