= Bottoms Up (1960 film) =

1960 British film by Mario Zampi

- Directed by: Mario Zampi
- Written by: Michael Pertwee; Additional dialogue by Frank Muir; Denis Norden
- Produced by: Giulio Zampi; Mario Zampi
- Starring: Jimmy Edwards; Arthur Howard; Martita Hunt; Sydney Tafler; Mitch Mitchell
- Cinematography: Gilbert Taylor
- Edited by: Richard Best
- Music by: Stanley Black
- Production company: Transocean [Mario Zampi Productions]
- Distributed by: Warner-Pathé Distributors
- Release date: 8 March 1960 (London)
- Running time: 90 minutes
- Country: United Kingdom
- Language: English

Bottoms Up is a 1960 British comedy film directed by Mario Zampi, and starring Jimmy Edwards in a spin-off of his TV comedy series Whack-O!, playing the seedy, alcoholic, cane-wielding headmaster of Chiselbury School, a fictional British public school. The screenplay was by Michael Pertwee, with additional dialogue by Frank Muir and Denis Norden.

The cast includes juvenile actor John "Mitch" Mitchell who in the late 1960s was the drummer in The Jimi Hendrix Experience, and Richard Briers in his first film appearance.

== Plot ==
Professor Jim Edwards is the headmaster of Chiselbury School, a private boarding school for boys. A new head of the school's Board of Governors threatens to replace him as headmaster unless he can drastically improve the school's performance. When Edwards is also confronted by his bookmaker demanding money he owes and which he cannot pay, he devises a plan to deal with both problems by agreeing to accept into Chiselbury the bookmaker's son who will impersonate the heir to the throne of an oil-rich (fictional) state in the Middle East, which he hopes will persuade other parents to enroll their sons.

== Cast ==
- Jimmy Edwards as Professor Jim Edwards
- Arthur Howard as Oliver Pettigrew
- Mitch Mitchell as Peregrine Wendover (credited as John Mitchell)
- Martita Hunt as Lady Gore-Willoughby
- Sydney Tafler as Sid Biggs
- Raymond Huntley as Garrick Jones
- Reginald Beckwith as Bishop Wendover
- Vanda Hudson as Matron (credited as Vanda)
- Melvyn Hayes as Cecil Biggs
- Donald Hewlett as Hamley
- Richard Briers as Colbourne

== Critical reception ==
The Monthly Film Bulletin wrote: "Though on a somewhat larger scale (notably in the climactic free-for-all), this comedy closely follows the pattern of the television show. This is probably just as well, since even the overall vigour and furore cannot alone compensate for some heavy-handed slapstick and a rambling script; one really needs a taste for Jimmy Edwards as well."

The Radio Times Guide to Films gave the film 2/5 stars, writing: "The strong supporting cast makes a solid contribution to an otherwise hit-and-miss comedy."

Leslie Halliwell said: "Rambling film version of a successful TV series."

TV Guide called the film an "inane slapstick comedy set in an English boarding school... Forced humour from a slapdash script and direction."

Allmovie wrote: "producer/director Mario Zampi knows where the laughs are and knows how to get them in full measure."

Sky Movies wrote: "it could have been a lot funnier, but, even so, it's a useful record of Edwards in his element."
