= Hugh Atkinson (novelist) =

Australian writer

Hugh Geddes Atkinson
- Born: 17 September 1921
- Died: 9 September 1994 (aged 72)
- Occupations: novelist, journalist, screenwriter, documentary film maker.

Hugh Geddes Atkinson (17 September 1921 – 9 September 1994) was an Australian novelist, journalist, screenwriter and documentary film maker.

== Early career ==
Hugh Atkinson was born in Parkes, New South Wales, Australia. In the course of his career, he worked at various jobs in the media industry in England, Germany, India, the Pacific and Australia. He worked as an advertising copywriter for the Lintas Group in the 1950s. He spent five years working as a technical officer for the Indian Government. He worked as a scriptwriter for the United Nations for two years. He became a full-time novelist in the late 1960s.

== Writing career ==
Hugh Atkinson's first novel, The Pink and the Brown, was published in 1957 and duly acclaimed as a critical success. Among other things, it looked at race relations in India in the 1950s. One of his later novels, The Longest Wire, recounted the story of the Overland Telegraph, one of the most ambitious projects attempted in 19th-century Australia. He wrote several other novels set in Outback Australia, notably Billy Two-Toes' Rainbow, which partly examines the lives of the Pitjantjatjara, an Aboriginal people of the Central Australian desert. His articles have appeared in The Bulletin and Nation. In all, he published more than 15 books, including novels and children's books, and numerous short stories. Atkinson also wrote one novel under the pseudonym Hugh Geddes. It was a fictional recounting of the famous Pyjama Girl Case involving an apparently sordid murder which remained unsolved for many years. The book was based on a 1977 film of the same name, directed by Italian filmmaker Flavio Mogherini.

== Screenwriting career ==
In addition to his extensive documentary film work, two of Hugh Atkinson's novels were made into films. His novel The Games, about the Olympics, was made into a film of the same name. His novel The Reckoning was made into a dramatic film entitled Weekend of Shadows. He wrote the screenplays for both films, and also for L’amante végétale, a short story which was made into a film in French, directed by Jean Valmont.

== Works ==
- The Pink and the Brown. Victor Gollancz, London. 1957.
- Low Company. F. W. Cheshire, London. 1961.
- The Reckoning. The Bodley Head, London. 1963.
- The Games. Bantam Books. 1968.
- The Most Savage Animal. Rupert Hart-Davis London, London. 1972.
- Johnny Horns. Corgi Children's, London. 1972.
- The Man in the Middle. Hart-Davis, London. 1973. ISBN 9780583123181
- Crack-up. Hart-Davis, London. 1974. ISBN 9780583124669
- Weekend to Kill. Angus & Robertson, Sydney. 1977. ISBN 9780207136023
- Unscheduled Flight. Mayflower, London. 1978. ISBN 9780246108944
- The Manipulators. Angus & Robertson, Sydney. 1978.ISBN 0207958130
- Billy Two-Toes' Rainbow. Nelson. 1982. ISBN 0170059634
- Grey's Valley: The Legend. Penguin. 1986. ISBN 9780140093940.
- A Twist in the Tale: Three Novellas. Penguin/Allen Lane. 1991. ISBN 9780140147124
- Jumping Jeweller of Lavender Bay. Viking/Allen Lane. 1992. From the 1992 edition "Authors Note" page 208, the story was originally published as a short story in Angus & Robertson anthology Coast to Coast in 1958 while the Author was in India, and later in 1962, it was also included in 'Australian Cavalcade', a school textbook of the time.

== Last days ==
Hugh Atkinson was made an Emeritus Fellow of the Literature Board of the Australia Council. He died in 1994.

== See also ==
- Australian outback literature of the 20th century
