= Maisie Mosco =

English writer (1924–2011)

- Born: December 7, 1924; Oldham, England
- Died: October 31, 2011 (aged 86); London, England
- Occupation: Writer
- Spouses: Aubrey Liston (m. 1948); Gerald Mosco (m. 1957)

Maisie Mosco (7 December 1924 – 31 October 2011) was an English writer.

She was born as Maisie Gottlieb in Oldham, northeast of Manchester, England, on 7 December 1924, the eldest of three children. Her parents were of Latvian Jewish and Viennese Jewish descent. Their respective families settled in England in the late 19th century, and both her parents were born in Manchester.

A clever girl, she wanted to study medicine though because of her mother's illness, and as the eldest child, she had to leave school at the age of 14 to help in the family business. At the age of 18, she joined the ATS and by the end of World War II, was helping to teach illiterate soldiers how to read.

She married twice: to Aubrey Liston in 1948, then to Gerald Mosco in 1957. She died in London on 31 October 2011, aged 86.

== Writings ==
After the war, she edited a Manchester Jewish weekly newspaper, the Jewish Gazette, subsequently writing radio plays for the BBC. One of her stage plays, Happy Family, became the basis of a horror film Mumsy, Nanny, Sonny and Girly.

She also wrote 16 novels between 1979 and 1998. These include the 'Almonds and Raisins' (Note: A hint to "Raisins and Almonds") series (Almonds & Raisins, Scattered Seed, Children's Children, Out of the Ashes, and New Beginnings), about a Jewish family who around 1900 fled anti-Jewish pogroms in the Russian Empire and emigrated to north Manchester in England. These books contained elements of her own family history.

In Almonds and Raisins the newly arrived Sandberg family see a tram for the first time – a Manchester double-decker. Abraham (the father) exclaims, "A train with two storeys? And no roof?" [Manchester trams were open-topped in the late 19th and early 20th century.] The local rabbi explains: "In English, they call it a tram.... In Yiddish, we don't have a word for it." "In the wire overhead, there's electricity, we don't have a word for that either."
