= Vanda Hudson =

Polish-born British actress (1933–2004)

- Hudson as Picturegoer cover-girl, 1958
- Born: Wanda Maria Zaleska; 7 October 1933; Slaskie, Poland
- Died: 2 April 2004 (aged 70); Hertfordshire, England
- Occupations: actress and cabaret artiste
- Years active: 1955–1971

Vanda Hudson (born Wanda Maria Zaleska; 7 October 1933 – 2 April 2004) was a Polish-born British film and television actress, cabaret entertainer and model. She was noted for playing blonde bombshell roles.

== Career ==
Born in Slaskie, Poland, Hudson emigrated to the UK in 1948 and after working as a cabaret singer found her first acting role in the 1955 BBC TV drama Miss Patterson.

From 1957–1969 she appeared in a dozen British films including Sapphire (1959), Bottoms Up (1960), Strip Tease Murder (1961) and Jungle Street Girls (1961), in which she sang "I'm Only a Girl" (Harold Geller/Perry Ford). In 1960 she appeared in the cult film Circus of Horrors in which she played a girl stabbed to death by a knife-thrower.

In 1959 she wrote a weekly column "Diary of a Glamour Girl" for Picturegoer magazine."

On TV she appeared in The Vise (1954) and The Avengers (1961).

In 1971 she appeared in cabaret in London at the Astor Club and in the review "Stand By For Take Off" at the Casino de Paris club.

== Personal life ==
Hudson was married to Jan Pikulski with whom she had two sons, Julian and Lucian.

After retiring from show business she ran the restaurant "Turpin's" in Hampstead, London.

== Filmography ==
- Greetings Cards (Pathé short newsreel, 1955) as self
- Seven Thunders (1957) as minor role (uncredited)
- Innocent Sinners (1958) as minor role (uncredited)
- Sapphire (1959) as girl at the Tulip Club (uncredited)
- The Heart of a Man (1959) as Cha Cha (billing: Vanda)
- Libel (1959) as girl in street
- Bottoms Up (1960) as Matron (billing: Vanda)
- Circus of Horrors (1960) as Magda von Meck
- Ticket to Paradise (1961) as Gina
- Strip Tease Murder (1961) as Angelin (billing: Wanda Hudson)
- Jungle Street Girls (1961) as Lucy Bell
- Father Came Too! (1964) as Nell Gwynne
- Happening (1968) (billing: Wanda Hudson)
- A Promise of Bed (1969) as Susan Stress

== TV appearances ==
- Miss Patterson (1955) as girl
- The Vise, S02E11, "Death Mask" (1954) as Toni
- The Avengers, S01E19, "Double Danger" (1961) as Lola Carrington
