= Lock Up Your Daughters (musical) =

1730 musical

Lock Up Your Daughters is a musical based on the 1730 comedy Rape upon Rape, by Henry Fielding, and adapted by Bernard Miles. The lyrics were written by Lionel Bart and the music by Laurie Johnson. It was first produced on the London stage in 1959.

In 1969, it was made into a film starring Christopher Plummer, Susannah York, and Glynis Johns, but the songs were deleted.

== Productions ==
Lock Up Your Daughters opened in London at the Mermaid Theatre on 28 May 1959, where it ran for 328 performances. This was the first production at the theatre. Directed by Peter Coe with choreography by Gilbert Vernon, and stage design by Sean Kenny, it featured Stephanie Voss (Hilaret Politic), Hy Hazell (Mrs. Squeezum), Terence Cooper (Capt. Constant), Frederick Jaeger (Ramble), John Sharp (Politic), Brendan Barry (Dabble), Richard Wordsworth (Squeezum), and Keith Marsh (Sotmore). A revival opened at the Mermaid Theatre on 17 May 1962 and ran for 664 performances. The director was Richard Wordsworth, with choreography by Denys Palmer.

Another revival ran in the West End at Her Majesty's Theatre in 1963 with Hy Hazell as (Mrs. Squeezum) and Sally Smith as Hilaret.

A Broadway version of the show was planned but closed on the road in 1960. It was directed by Alfred Drake, and featured Nancy Dussault as Hilaret, John Michael King and George S. Irving, and Hy Hazell repeating her role as Mrs. Squeezum.

An Australian production opened at the Princess Theatre, Melbourne in April 1961, and toured to Sydney, Adelaide and Perth.

The Goodspeed Opera House (Connecticut) has performed the show twice, in 1969 and 1982. The 1982 production was directed by Bill Gile (Darwin Knight was credited) and featured Carleton Carpenter (Mr. Squeezum), Dena Olstad (Hilaret), Keith Rice, (Constant), and Jeff McCarthy (Ramble).(Mr. Carpenter published a comic murder mystery about the production called "The Peabody Experience").

== Plot summary ==
Note: there is one set, which serves as a street scene, Justice Squeezum's courtroom, Mrs Squeezum's boudoir, a tavern bar-room, Politic's parlour, Hilaret's bedroom, a prison cell, an upstairs room at the tavern, and Justice Worthy's courtroom.

In London, 1735, naive young Hilaret leaves the over-protective walls of her father's house resolved to elope with her beloved Captain Constant. She charges Ramble with rape, and her maid Cloris charges Constant with rape. The cases are tried by the corrupt justice, Mr. Squeezum.

== Characters ==
Singing Principals

- Hilaret – naive young woman
- Mrs Squeezum – the lecherous wife of Justice Squeezum
- Cloris – Hilaret's maid
- Justice Squeezum – a corrupt judge
- Ramble – a ladies' man, accused by Hilaret of rape
- Sotmore – his drunken friend.
- Captain Constant – Hilaret's love interest
- Politic – Hilaret's father
- Dabble – his coffee-house friend

Other characters

- Quill – Squeezum's clerk
- Staff – a constable
- Faithful – Politic's servant
- Brazencourt – an innkeeper
- Justice Worthy – an honest man

== Songs ==
- All's Well
- The Gentle Art of Seduction
- If I'd Known You
- I'll Be There
- Is This the Happy Ending?
- It Must Be True
- Kind Fate
- Lock Up Your Daughters
- Lovely Lover
- Mister Jones
- On the Side
- A Proper Man
- Red Wine and a Wench
- Sunny Sunday Morning
- There's A Plot Afoot
- 'Tis Plain To See
- When Does the Ravishing Begin?

== Film ==
The film based on the musical and play was directed by the musical's director, Peter Coe. It was released in the UK in March 1969 and in the US in October 1969. Filmed in Kilkenny, Ireland by Domino Films it ran for 102 minutes. The film originally was given an "X" certificate (over 18's) by the UK Censor, but it was given a "15" on video.

In his review, Roger Greenspun wrote: "...a three-strand plot that has been so smothered in atmosphere, activity and authenticity that even the great traditions of theatrical untruth cannot breathe life into it. The production values of "Lock Up Your Daughters!" are ambitious enough to fill three movies, but they are not sufficient to substitute for one."
