= Mumsy, Nanny, Sonny and Girly =

1970 film by Freddie Francis

- Theatrical release poster
- Directed by: Freddie Francis
- Screenplay by: Brian Comport
- Based on: Happy Family by Maisie Mosco
- Produced by: Ronald J. Kahn
- Starring: Michael Bryant; Ursula Howells; Pat Heywood; Howard Trevor; Vanessa Howard
- Cinematography: David Muir
- Edited by: Tristam Cones
- Music by: Bernard Ebbinghouse
- Production companies: Brigitte Films; Fitzroy–Francis Films
- Distributed by: Cinerama Releasing
- Release dates: 12 February 1970 (New York City); 6 September 1970 (United Kingdom)
- Running time: 101 minutes
- Country: United Kingdom
- Language: English

Mumsy, Nanny, Sonny and Girly (released as Girly outside the United Kingdom) is a 1970 British comedy horror film directed by Freddie Francis and starring Michael Bryant, Ursula Howells, Pat Heywood, Howard Trevor and Vanessa Howard.

Francis wanted the opportunity to direct a film over which he had complete creative control, instead of working on assignment from a studio (as was the case with his previous directorial efforts). He teamed with writer Brian Comport to build the film around Oakley Court, which Francis had used for exterior shots in previous films. The script was based on a two-act play by Maisie Mosco titled Happy Family, which was adapted into a novella by screenwriter Brian Comport as Mumsy, Nanny, Sonny and Girly. Although the film fared poorly in British cinemas, it enjoyed a brief, successful run in North America, and subsequently achieved status as a cult film.

In the film, four inhabitants of a secluded manor house in England amuse themselves with a bizarre role-playing game.

== Plot ==
Four individuals live in a secluded manor house in the English countryside, where they engage in an elaborate role-playing fantasy called The Game. In The Game, each individual assumes the role of a member in a "happy" family, completely subsuming his or her individual personality to the point that each individual is known only by the identity he or she is playing: Mumsy (the mother), Nanny (the nanny), Sonny (the son) and Girly (the daughter). The Game is built around a set of strictly enforced yet ill-defined rules, and the principal one is "Rule No. 1: Play the Game".

As a part of The Game, the teenaged Sonny and Girly regularly venture to more populated areas, where the pair use Girly to lure men back to the manor house. Once there, the men are dressed like schoolboys and forcibly indoctrinated into The Game, assuming the roles of "New Friends". Those who refuse are "sent to the Angels"—a euphemism for being ritualistically murdered in scenarios built around playground games, which Sonny routinely records on a 16 mm camera so that the family can enjoy the resultant snuff film.

One night, Girly and Sonny stake out a Swinging London party, where they encounter a male prostitute and his latest client. An instant attraction develops between Girly and the man, who convinces his client to accompany the siblings for a night of carousing. Girly and Sonny take the couple to a playground, where they murder the woman by throwing her from a large slide. The next morning, Sonny and Girly convince the hungover man that he murdered the woman after a night of heavy drinking, and they persuade him to return to the manor with them. The prostitute—rechristened "New Friend"—is outfitted in schoolboy clothes and subjected to an indeterminate period of torment "playing the game", during which he is repeatedly presented with his client's body as a reminder that the family has incriminating information about him.

After Mumsy makes sexual overtures to New Friend one evening, he gets the idea to turn the family against itself. New Friend's plot succeeds as he creates sexual jealousy between the women after first sleeping with Mumsy and then Girly. Sonny, left out of the sexual politics, petitions to have New Friend "sent to the angels"; in a moment of panic, Girly bludgeons Sonny to death with an antique mirror. Chastising Girly for creating a mess, Mumsy dismisses Sonny as "naughty" and orders a visibly shaken New Friend to bury Sonny beneath a drained fountain on the manor grounds, which is populated by makeshift gravestones bearing the numerical identities assigned to dispatched "friends".

Nanny, jealous that she is the only female member of the household left out of New Friend's attentions, attempts to murder Mumsy with an acid-tipped needle, but the attempt fails when it is inadvertently interrupted by New Friend. Girly, realising that Nanny has set her sights on New Friend, hacks Nanny to death with an axe. In the kitchen, Mumsy finds Nanny's head cooking in a pot and Girly sings "When she's dead, boil her head, make it into gingerbread".

Mumsy and Girly declare a truce, deciding to "share" New Friend by alternating which days of the week each of them will be permitted to have sex with him. They ponder what will happen should either of them become bored with him, which Girly declares is an inevitability. Overhearing their conversation, New Friend retrieves Nanny's acid-tipped needle and, lying smiling on Mumsy's bed, hides it under the pillow.

== Cast ==
- Michael Bryant as New Friend
- Ursula Howells as Mumsy
- Pat Heywood as Nanny
- Howard Trevor as Sonny
- Vanessa Howard as Girly
- Robert Swann as soldier
- Imogen Hassall as girlfriend
- Michael Ripper as zoo attendant
- Hugh Armstrong as Friend in Five

== Production ==
The film began as a dream project for Freddie Francis, a cinematographer who had made the transition to directing at the beginning of the 1960s. Although he had numerous directorial credits to his name, each of these credits had come to him on commission from a studio, and Francis had dreamed of making a film over which he had complete creative control. Over the course of his career, Francis had shot several exterior scenes for films at Oakley Court, but lamented the fact that neither he nor any other director had the opportunity to film inside the building; in putting together his project, Francis decided that his film would be set in and around Oakley Court, with the script tailored to the building's unique landscaping and architecture.

Having never written a film himself, Francis hired writer Brian Comport to craft a screenplay, with the only condition being that the story had to be built around Oakley Court. Trying to come up with ideas, Francis and Comport attended the production of an Off West End play titled Happy Family, written by Maisie Mosco, then a radio playwright for the BBC. The play—influenced by Shirley Jackson's We Have Always Lived in the Castle and Tennessee Williams' Baby Doll—concerned a woman recently forced to undergo a hysterectomy by her abusive husband, who shortly thereafter left her for a younger woman. Having gone insane, the woman—redubbed Mumsy—forces her two children and her maid to join her in an elaborate role-playing game in which young societal dropouts are welcomed into the family as new "children" for Mumsy. Both men thought that the play—which was overtly sexual and dealt explicitly with incest, lesbianism, and sadomasochism—was "terrible", but agreed that it was an excellent tipping-off point for a story that would take place at Oakley Court. Little of the play's story would survive into Comport's script, beyond the names of the principal characters and the basic premise of an isolated family engaging in a deadly role-playing game.

Owing to the film's origins as a stage production, Francis largely completed the casting with experienced stage performers who had made the transition to film, such as Ursula Howells, Pat Heywood and Michael Bryant. The zookeeper whom Sonny and Girly harass in the film's opening sequence was played by Michael Ripper, a regular in Hammer Horror films whom Francis knew from his time working for the studio. Howard Trevor, who played Sonny, had only a single screen credit on an episode of the anthology series ITV Playhouse; Girly would prove to be his only film. Vanessa Howard, who had also gotten her start on ITV, was a relative newcomer who had starred in four films before Girly; she performed so well that it was decided in post-production that she would become the centerpiece of the film's marketing campaign, with the intention of turning the film into a star vehicle for her.

The film was produced amid a backlash against indecency in the British media, brought in part by the production of more overtly sexual films targeted towards the mods and Swinging London. Media watchdogs latched onto a scene in the opening minutes of the film in which Girly suggestively sucks Sonny's finger after accepting a piece of candy from him. The scene was the result of Comport's having toyed with the idea of carrying over incest themes from the play, in which Sonny and Girly are explicitly engaged in a sexual relationship. Comport ultimately decided against this idea, deciding it was more thematically appropriate to the film to imply incest but never confirm it. Although the scene is the only implication of incest in the film, it came to be the film's definitive moment in contemporary media reviews.

== Release ==
Mumsy, Nanny, Sonny and Girly opened in New York City on 12 February 1970. The film had its UK premiere in London on 8 April 1970, followed by a nationwide release on 6 September 1970. In the United Kingdom, it was released concurrently with Goodbye Gemini (1970), about a mentally imbalanced young man sexually obsessed with his sister. The two pictures created a moral panic among British media watchdogs and were held up as indicative of the state of the British media. Due to this backlash, few theatres wished to screen the film following its West End premiere.

In an attempt to recoup losses, the film was rebranded for release in the United States, where exploitation films were enjoying moderate success. Retitled simply Girly, the film's advertising campaign was retooled to be built exclusively around Vanessa Howard, removing all of her co-stars from the film's posters.

== Critical reception ==
The Monthly Film Bulletin wrote:

Although always agreeable to look at, with Freddie Francis and his camera prowling as elegantly as usual, this is a distinct disappointment in what might have been a happy return to the territory of The Psychopath [1966] and Torture Garden [1967]. Most of the trouble seems to lie in the script, which has evident ambitions to cross Pinter with Gothic, but succeeds merely in being Grand Guignol, and pretty limp Grand Guignol at that. Everything is said in the pre-credits sequence where the off-screen voices of Mumsy and Nanny coo cloyingly over the dear little children, whom we see to be nasty, pubescent beasts. After that it is simply a matter of waiting for the horrors, and it comes as no surprise when a nice game of "Oranges and Lemons" ends, on the appropriate verse, with the unhappy playmate being beheaded. The latter half picks up somewhat though, with Sonny stalking a condemned playmate through the garden, camera in hand (shades of Peeping Tom [1960]) to record the face of terror; and Ursula Howells, murmuring "Oh, Girly!" in tones of mild reproach when she discovers Ninny's head cooking on the stove in a stewpot, is a delight throughout.

Variety said:

Mumsy, Nanny, Sonny and Girly is an offbeat, low-key horror melodrama – a macabre combo of Disney and Hammer films, in which a lady, her maid and two kids kidnap and murder unsuspecting males. Freddie Francis, onetime cameraman and in recent years a horror buff fave for his direction of British shockers, does an excellent job in making the most of his unusual, if distended, premise. Gory details are mercifully implicit (the way shock used to be so effective), and to an extent also the sex overtones. Ronald J. Kahn's completely-on-location production is atmospherically superior. Well cast but overlong, the Cinerama release is a special item which, with proper nursing, might realize its sleeper ambitions. ... David Muir's excellent, soft-focus lensing maximizes the mood, superbly established physically by Maggie Pinhorn's art direction and set dressing by Dimity Collins. Bernard Ebbinghouse's eerie score, including minor key juve refrains, is most effective. At 101 minutes (edited by Tristan Cones), film is about 10 minutes too long but by coincidence that's just right for TV."

== Legacy ==
The film's failure at the British box office led to Vanessa Howard's decision to retire from acting in 1972; at the time of her decision, she was unaware of the film's success in the United States and remained uninformed for some time. Despite the film's financial failure, Francis maintained for the rest of his life that it had been his best work and his personal favourite of all the films he made.

The film disappeared from cinemas in the US and England for several years. It was released on VHS in North America (again under the title of Girly); copies proved difficult to obtain in the United Kingdom as the organizers of a Freddie Francis film festival in 2004 were unable to turn up a print or VHS copy of the film to screen. Around 2006, bootleg copies of the film began to surface on the Internet. Shortly thereafter, Salvation Films announced that it had obtained the rights to release Girly on DVD. The release entered development hell, with Salvation's promising the film's upcoming release on its website for the next three years. In the interim, Francis died, eliminating hopes of a potential director's commentary. Salvation sold its rights to Scorpion Releasing, which recorded an interview with writer Brian Comport and obtained a radio interview with Francis regarding the film to be included as special features. Howard, having learned of the film's cult status, agreed to record a commentary for the DVD; however, Howard was terminally ill at the time, and she proved too weak to participate. The DVD was released on 30 March 2010, with remastered audio and video. Howard died in October 2010, seven months after the film's release.

In 2012, Tightrope Theatre of Portland, Oregon, re-adapted the screenplay back into stage format and mounted what is purported to be the world premiere stage production of Happy Family. Production dates were 11 May through 9 June 2012 at Tightrope Theatre's performance space in southeast Portland. The adaptation was done by Elizabeth Klinger, and the production was directed by James Peck. The cast included Jamie Rea, Rebecca Teran, David Cole, Elizabeth Klinger and Zachary Rouse. The production's stage manager was Lizz Esch Brown.

In 2015, an event was held at Oakley Court to pay tribute to Howard and the production of the film. The event included the dedication of a memorial bench in Howard's memory, a trip to some of the film's shooting locations, and a dinner themed around the Family's meal with New Friend. In attendance was journalist Preston Fassel, the author of a biography on Howard that appeared in the Spring 2014 issue of Screem magazine; Fassel answered questions regarding the film's production and Howard's life.

== Influence ==
Modern film critics have speculated that the film was a possible influence on Stanley Kubrick's film The Shining (1980), particularly a scene in which Sonny chases one of the "friends" with an axe, hacking through the panel of a door and exposing his face to the room's occupant. Although a visually similar scene appears in the much earlier film The Phantom Carriage (1921), the scene predates the "Here's Johnny" sequence in The Shining by over a decade.
