= The Whole Truth (1958 film) =

Film by John Guillermin

- Directed by: John Guillermin
- Written by: Jonathan Latimer
- Based on: The Whole Truth by Philip Mackie
- Produced by: Jack Clayton
- Starring: Stewart Granger; Donna Reed; George Sanders; Gianna Maria Canale
- Cinematography: Wilkie Cooper
- Edited by: Gerry Hambling
- Music by: Mischa Spoliansky
- Production company: Romulus Films
- Distributed by: Columbia Pictures
- Release dates: 29 July 1958 (London); September 1958 (United States)
- Running time: 84 minutes
- Countries: United Kingdom; United States
- Language: English
- Box office: 392,806 admissions (France)

The Whole Truth is a 1958 British-American thriller film directed by John Guillermin and starring Stewart Granger, George Sanders, Donna Reed, Gianna Maria Canale and Peter Dyneley. It was written by Jonathan Latimer based on the 1955 play of the same title by Philip Mackie.

== Plot ==
While making a film on the French Riviera, the producer, Max Poulton, has been having an affair with his star, Gina Bertini. A married man, Max does not want to lose his wife Carol, but the hot-tempered Gina threatens to tell all. Max comes home with a blood stain on his shirt cuff. A visit follows from an Inspector Hugh Carliss of Scotland Yard, who says Gina's body has just been found, stabbed to death.

Rushing to the house where he and Gina used to secretly meet, Max gathers up possessions he's left behind. A neighbour spots his car. Upon returning home, to a party Carol is hosting, Max is astounded to find Gina alive and well among the guests. Confused, he drives her home, leaves her in the car briefly, then returns to find her lifeless body, stabbed. This time, a local police official, Inspector Simon, comes to call. The only conclusion Max can draw is that Carliss is somehow trying to frame him.

Max's suspicions are correct. Carliss is not a Scotland Yard inspector at all but Gina's jealous husband. He has arranged things to make Max appear guilty, and Simon, having the neighbour's eyewitness description of seeing Max's car, has little choice but to place Max under arrest. When it looks as though Carliss intends to harm Carol as well, Max escapes from jail. He manipulates Carliss into stealing his own car, and when the police give chase to the wrong man, Carliss, in a panic, drives off a cliff to his death. Max's innocence becomes apparent to the police.

== Cast ==
- Stewart Granger as Max Poulton
- Donna Reed as Carol Poulton
- George Sanders as Hugh Carliss
- Gianna Maria Canale as Gina Bertini
- Michael Shillo as Inspector Simon
- Richard Molinas as Gilbert
- Peter Dyneley as Willy Reichel
- John Van Eyssen as Archer
- Philip Vickers as Jack Leslie
- Jimmy Thompson as Assistant
- Hy Hazell as American Woman

== Production ==
The US rights and film rights were bought by Gilbert Miller in January 1956. The film was made by Romulus Productions at Walton Studios with some brief location shooting in France. The film's sets were designed by the art director Anthony Masters.

Stewart Granger had just finished his contract with MGM and signed a two-picture deal with Romulus, of which The Whole Truth was to be the first. Jeanne Crain was originally announced as the female lead Carol Poulton, but Donna Reed ended up playing it. George Sanders joined the cast in July 1957.

During shooting, Romulus announced that they had offered Granger a six-picture contract worth $1.5 million; but he made no more films for that company. Teddy Darvas, sound editor, recalled that Granger "behaved exceedingly badly to Jackie Clayton on that film" by demanding large amounts of money to do ADR.

Granger wrote in his memoir Sparks Fly Upward that the film was meant to be the first in a two-picture deal, the second being an adaptation of the Eric Ambler novel The Night-Comers which he would make with Jean Simmons. Granger called The Whole Truth "a run of the mill 'whodunnit'" in which the director John Guillermin "went on to fame directing an oversized ape in the remake of King Kong. I'm sure he got on better with that mechanized gorilla than he did with us. He was peculiarly lacking in charm, to say the least." According to Granger, the second film was not made when the intended director, Jack Clayton, did not want to make it after Room at the Top.

== Reception ==
The Monthly Film Bulletin wrote: "The plot of this murder mystery is ingeniously contrived – if totally implausible – so ingeniously as to become thoroughly confused. In striving to make the twists and turns of the plot clear, the director loses control over his players, with the result that the performances are never more than adequate."

Kine Weekly wrote: "Stewart Granger plays the tycoon-cum-playboy with easy assurance as Max, Donna Reed is a charming, unaffected Carol, Gianna Maria Canale scores in contrasts as the volatile, man-crazy Gina, and George Sanders is in his element as the vindictive, mentally unbalanced Carliss. Its supporting types too, register."

Variety wrote: "This is a cosy little meller with some suave dialog, a slightly confused plot and some straightforward playing. ... But it is a routine effort which is unlikely to create outstanding interest, Granger and Sanders can play such roles on their heads, and Donna Reed as Granger's long-suffering wife, has little to do but look decorative. The most interesting piece of thesping comes from an elegant Italian actress, Gianna Maria Canale, who not only looks exciting but produces fireworks in the role of temperamental, possessive film actress. ... John Guillermin's direction is brisk and brings out as much tension as the story permits."

Leslie Halliwell said: "A filmed play, but quite a solidly carpentered murder thriller with a couple of neat twists."

FilmInk praised the "brilliant first half".

In British Sound Films: The Studio Years 1928–1959, David Quinlan rated the film as "good", writing: "Competent thriller, suitable mystifying if occasionally convincing."

The Radio Times Guide to Films gave the film 3/5 stars, writing: "The over-the-top performances and overwrought direction ensure it's never boring."
