= Semi-Detached (play) =

Play written by David Turner in 1962

- Original poster West End transfer, 1962
- Written by: David Turner
- Original language: English
- Setting: Spring, 1962. The home of Fred Midway, Dowlihull, England.

Premiere
- Date premiered: 8 June 1962
- Place premiered: Belgrade Theatre, Coventry

Semi-Detached is a play written by David Turner. It premiered at the Belgrade Theatre, Coventry in June 1962 with Leonard Rossiter in the lead role, the production was directed by Tony Richardson. In 1964, the BBC recorded a radio adaptation starring Rossiter, rebroadcast in 2016 in its series Repertory in Britain. The Belgrade Theatre production transferred to London, still directed by Richardson, but with Laurence Olivier (replacing Rossiter), Eileen Atkins, John Thaw, James Bolam (replacing Ian McKellen) and Mona Washbourne. The play reached Broadway in New York for a season in 1963 and a film version All the Way Up (1970), directed by James MacTaggart, starred Warren Mitchell. The play was revived at the Chichester Festival in 1999.

== Plot ==
Set in the Midlands, Fred Midway is working his way up the social ladder. His desire to be accepted in the social circles to which he aspires occupies much of his energy. At first, Fred's carefully laid plans to boost his standing in the local community backfire, before coming right in the end.

== Original cast ==
- Arnold Makepiece - Brendan Barry
- Avril Hadfield - Bridget Turner
- Eileen Midway - Fiona Duncan
- Fred Midway - Leonard Rossiter
- Garnet Hadfield - Sheila Keith
- Hilda Midway - Gillian Raine
- Nigel Hadfield - Michael Rothwell
- Robert Freeman - William Holmes
- Tom Midway - Ian McKellen
