= The Whole Truth (play) =

British theatrical play

- Original language: English
- Written by: Philip Mackie
- Genre: Thriller

Premiere
- Date: 3 October 1955
- Place: Royal Lyceum Theatre, Edinburgh; Aldwych Theatre, London

The Whole Truth is a 1955 thriller play by the British writer Philip Mackie.

Originally written and broadcast by the BBC as a television play, it was rewritten for the stage the same year. It premiered at the Royal Lyceum Theatre in Edinburgh, before beginning a 145 performance West End run at the Aldwych Theatre. The original cast included Leslie Phillips, Ernest Clark and Sarah Lawson.

== Film adaptation ==
In 1958 it was made into a film The Whole Truth directed by John Guillermin starring Stewart Granger and Donna Reed and George Sanders.

== Bibliography ==
- Goble, Alan. The Complete Index to Literary Sources in Film. Walter de Gruyter, 1999.
- Wearing, J.P. The London Stage 1950-1959: A Calendar of Productions, Performers, and Personnel. Rowman & Littlefield, 2014.
