= David Turner (dramatist) =

British playwright

David Turner (18 March 1927 – 11 December 1990) was a British playwright.

Turner was born in Birmingham and came from a working-class background. He studied French at Birmingham University and later worked as a school teacher in that city. He is best remembered for his stage play Semi-Detached, first performed during 1962, which reached Broadway and was adapted for the film All the Way Up (1970). He prepared modern versions of classic plays including John Gay's The Beggar's Opera, a version seen in London in 1968, and The Miser by Molière, which was performed at the Birmingham Rep in 1973.

An early opponent of the 'Clean-Up TV' founder Mary Whitehouse, Turner interrupted the initial meeting at Birmingham Town Hall in April 1964 as an audience member. At this event, which first brought Mrs Whitehouse to national attention, he accused her of attacking creative freedoms. In Swizzlewick (BBC 1964), a twice weekly comedy drama he created, Turner wrote a series' episode featuring possibly the earliest parody of the morality campaigner. Way Off Beat, transmitted as a Wednesday Play in June 1966, was another suburban comedy like Semi-Detached. Critic John Russell Taylor thought Turner had "revivified the Jonsonian [Ben Jonson's] comedy of humours".

Turner was for a time a scriptwriter on The Archers, the BBC radio soap opera. He also adapted literary works for television. A five-part version of Germinal, from the 1885 novel by Émile Zola, was transmitted early in 1970 and The Roads to Freedom (also 1970) was a thirteen-part adaptation of the novel of that name by Jean-Paul Sartre. Both were nominated for several BAFTA awards including one for Turner's version of Sartre's work. He also wrote versions of Stella Gibbons' Cold Comfort Farm (1968) based on her comic classic and North and South (1975) from the 1855 novel by Elizabeth Gaskell.

He died in 1990, aged 63, in Leamington Spa, Warwickshire.
