= Philip Mackie =

British screenwriter (1918–1985)

- Born: 26 November 1918; Salford, Lancashire, England, United Kingdom
- Died: 23 December 1985 (aged 67); England, United Kingdom
- Education: University College London
- Occupations: Screenwriter, television writer, television producer
- Relatives: Pearl Mackie (granddaughter)

Philip Mackie (26 November 1918 – 23 December 1985) was a British film and television screenwriter. He was born in Salford in Lancashire, England. He graduated in 1939 from University College London and worked for the Ministry of Information Films Division which began a career in film.

== Work ==
In August 1955 Mackie became, along with Nigel Kneale, one of the first two staff scriptwriters to be employed by BBC Television; scriptwriters had previously been employed on short-term or freelance contracts. The same year he adapted one of his television works into a successful stage play The Whole Truth which ran for more than a hundred performances in the West End and was then adapted into a film of the same title by Columbia Pictures.

In the early 1960s he wrote several screenplays for the series of films made at Merton Park Studios, loosely based on Edgar Wallace stories and novels.

Mackie was the producer and writer of the acclaimed 1968 ITV historical drama series The Caesars about the Julio-Claudian Roman emperors and later wrote the 1972 series "The Organization" and the 1974 series Napoleon and Love, starring Ian Holm, about Napoleon Bonaparte's relationships with his women as a backdrop to his rise and fall as Emperor of the French.

In 1975 and 1976, Mackie adapted two Graham Greene short stories, "Cheap in August" and "A Drive in the Country," for episodes of Shades of Greene presented by Thames Television.

He also wrote the script for the television adaptation of the defiantly exhibitionist homosexual Quentin Crisp's autobiography The Naked Civil Servant, for which John Hurt won the BAFTA for Best Actor in 1976.

In 1977 he adapted the Raffles stories for Yorkshire Television.

== Family ==
Mackie had four daughters: Susan, Charlotte, Alexandra, and Barbara. One of his granddaughters is actress Pearl Mackie.

== Selected filmography ==
=== Film ===
- The Whole Truth (1958)
- Clue of the Twisted Candle (1960)
- Clue of the Silver Key (1961)
- Man at the Carlton Tower (1961)
- The Brain (1962)
- The Share Out (1962)
- Number Six (1962)

=== Television ===
- The Big Killing (1965)
- Mr. Rose (1967–1968)
- The Caesars (1968)
- The Rivals of Sherlock Holmes (1971)
- The Organization (1972)
- Raffles (1975–1977)
- Napoleon and Love (1974)
- An Englishman's Castle (1978)
- Thérèse Raquin (1980)
- Jemima Shore Investigates (1983)
- The Cleopatras (1983)

=== Plays ===
- The Whole Truth (1955)
- Open House (1957)
- The Key of the Door (1958)
- The Big Killing (1962)
- Maigret and the Lady (1965)
- The Chairman (1976)
- Marriage (1977)
