= Just William (disambiguation) =

Just William is the first book of children's short stories by Richmal Crompton featuring the fictional schoolboy William Brown.

Just William may also refer to:

- Just William (book series)
- Just William (film), a 1940 British comedy film
- Just William (1970s TV series)
- Just William (1990s TV series)
- Just William (2010 TV series)
- Just William (radio series)
