= Just William (radio series) =

1990s British radio series

- Genre: Radio audiobook
- Country of origin: United Kingdom
- Language: English
- Starring: Martin Jarvis
- Written by: Richmal Crompton
- Produced by: Pete Atkin
- Opening theme: "Won't You Be My Ginger?"

Just William is a 1990s BBC Radio series based on the Just William series of books by Richmal Crompton. The series is read by Martin Jarvis and has become one of the most well-known adaptations of the books. Produced by Pete Atkin, the series has been released on cassette and CD. Beginning in 2000, the theme music for the series has been the piano piece "Won't You Be My Ginger?" by pianist/composer, Richard Dworsky.

== Releases ==
There are six full unabridged recordings of the original books. They have a total duration of 28 hours 30 minutes, and cover 61 stories:

- Just William – book no. 1, 4 hours 50 minutes, 12 stories:

William Goes to the Pictures, William the Intruder, William Below Stairs, The Fall of the Idol, The Show, A Question of Grammar, William Joins the Band of Hope, The Outlaws, William and White Satin, William's New Year's Day, The Best Laid Plans, "Jumble"

- More William – book no. 2, 5 hours 2 minutes, 14 stories:

A Busy Day, Rice Mould, William's Burglar, The Knight at Arms, William's Hobby, The Rivals, The Ghost, The May King, The Revenge, The Helper, William and the Smuggler, The Reform of William, William and the Ancient Souls, William's Christmas Eve

- William Again – book no. 3, 6 hours 5 minutes, 14 stories:

What Delayed the Great Man, The Cure, That Boy, William the Reformer, Not Much, William and the White Cat, William's Secret Society, The Native Protégé, Just William's Luck, The Great Detective, The Circus, William Sells the Twins, William's Helping Hand, William Gets Wrecked

- William's Happy Days – book no. 12, 6 hours 22 minutes, 10 stories:

William and the School Report, William Goes Shopping, William's Birthday, The Christmas Truce, William and the Cow, The Outlaws and the Hidden Treasure, William the Superman, William Helps the Cause, William and the Twins, William Puts Things Right

- William The Pirate – book no. 14, 6 hours 10 minutes, 11 stories:

William and the Musician, William Holds the Stage, The Outlaws and the Triplets, William and the Eastern Curse, The New Neighbour, Mrs Bott's Hat, William and the Princess Goldilocks, Their Good Resolution, William's Invention, Aunt Arabelle in Charge, A Little Affair of Rivalry

- William's Treasure Trove – book no. 33, 4 hours 15 minutes, 6 stories:

William and the Holiday Centre, William's Treasure Trove, William and the Cottage, William Tackles the Job, William and Detective Journalism, William and the Parson's Guy

There are 10 abridged story collections. Each collection is about 2.5 hours long and has 10 or 12 stories, with the total of 112 stories. Each story is 13 to 15 minutes long. There is also one "best of" collection available:

- Just William 1

The Christmas Truce, Only Just In Time, The Midnight Adventure of Miss Montague, William and the Musician, William Leads a Better Life, William and the Twins, William’s Birthday, William and the Little Girl, The Outlaws and Cousin Percy, William and the Princess Goldilocks

- Just William 2

The Sweet Little Girl in White, A Birthday Treat, The Outlaws and the Triplets, A Bit of Blackmail, William Makes a Night of It, The Leopard Hunter, William and the Lost Tourist, The New Neighbour, William the Philanthropist, William and the Prize Cat

- Just William 3

William Holds the Stage, William and the School Report, All the News, Aunt Arabelle in Charge, William's Goodbye Present, William The Salvage Collector, William's Day Off, Entertainment Provided, William and the Brains Trust, William and the Bomb

- Just William 4

William Goes Shopping, Violet Elizabeth Runs Away, William and the Real Laurence, The Outlaws and the Hidden Treasure, William and the Fairy Daffodil, The Best Laid Plans, Mrs Bott's Hat, William Starts the Holidays, William Plays Santa Claus, William and the Snowman, Revenge is Sweet, William and the Black Cat

- Just William 5

William and the Russian Prince, William's Busy Day, William The Great Actor, William and the White Elephants, Finding a School for William, William's Birthday, William Clears The Slums, Parrots for Ethel, William's Truthful Christmas, Boys Will Be Boys, William and the Ebony Hair-Brush, William and the Old Man in the Fog

- Just William 6

That Boy, The Bishop's Handkerchief, William and Uncle George, The Haunted House, William and St Valentine, April Fool's Day, Not Much, The Cure, William's Wonderful Plan, The Outlaws and the Penknife, William the Reformer, William's New Year's Day

- Just William 7 – 2 hours 56 minutes, 12 stories:

Aunt Florence and the Green Woodpecker, The Plan That Failed, William and the Begging Letter, A Question of Exchange, William and the Temporary History Master, The Outlaws and the Tramp, A Few Dogs and William, The Outlaws and the Missionary, William the Good, William and the Young Man, William and the Spy, William and the Badminton Racket

- Just William 8 – 2 hours 50 minutes, 12 stories:

William Turns Over a New Leaf, William and Dear Little Peter, William and the Waxwork Prince, William and the White Cat, William and Photography, The Great Detective, The Fete - and Fortune, The Weak Spot, The Outlaws Go a-Mumming, William's Double Life, William to the Rescue, William the Film Star

- Just William 9 – 2 hours 47 minutes, 12 stories:

William the Rat Lover, William the Showman, William and the Monster, William the Persian, The New Game, William and the Love Test, The Cat and the Mouse, Waste Paper Wanted, William the Globe Trotter, William and the Prize Pig, A Present from William, A Night of Mysteries

- Just William 10 – 2 hours 14 minutes, 6 stories (5 short ones and one long in 5 parts):

William and the Chinese God, William and the League of Perfect Love, Fireworks Strictly Prohibited, William the Psychiatrist, William joins the Waits, Just William Strikes Again (Violet Elizabeth takes control, William – The Dear Little Boysie, William’s Brilliant Plan, The Outlaws and Aunt Jo, Violet Elizabeth's Special Party)

- Just William's Greatest Hits – a collection of 17 stories taken from the above Just William series 1 to 9:

The Midnight Adventure of Miss Montague (JW1), The Outlaws and Cousin Percy (JW1), A Bit of Blackmail (JW2), William and the Bomb (JW3), William and the Snowman (JW4), Violet Elizabeth Runs Away (JW4), William and the Real Laurence (JW4), Finding a School for William (JW5), William's Truthful Christmas (JW5), The Haunted House (JW6), William and the Begging Letter (JW7), William and the Badminton Racket (JW7), A Question of Exchange (JW7), The Weak Spot (JW8), William the Rat Lover (JW9), The Sweet Little Girl in White (JW2), William and the Princess Goldilocks (JW1)

Finally, there are five other William titles available:

- Just William's Luck – abridged reading of the only full-length William novel (all other William books are collections of short stories)
- Just William Live on Stage - unabridged reading recorded in front of a live audience at the Cheltenham Festival of Literature

o Sweet Little Girl in White, William and the Princess Goldilocks

- Just William Live on Stage 2 – unabridged reading recorded in front of a live audience at the Cheltenham Festival of Literature

o The Lost Tourist, The Leopard Hunter

- Just William Live on Stage 3 – unabridged reading recorded in front of a live audience at the Cheltenham Festival of Literature

o William Holds the Stage and Aunt Arabelle in Charge

- Just William Live on Stage 4 – unabridged reading recorded in front of a live audience at the Cheltenham Festival of Literature

o The Outlaws and the Triplets and The New Neighbour

- Just William Live on Stage 5 – unabridged reading recorded in front of a live audience at the Cheltenham Festival of Literature

o The Christmas Truce and Violet Elizabeth Runs Away

- Just William Live on Stage 6 – unabridged reading recorded in front of a live audience at the Cheltenham Festival of Literature
- Just William - Home for the Holidays – 12 unabridged stories from the book What's Wrong With Civilizashun.

My Summer Holiday, What's Wrong with Civilizashun, The Job I'd Like Best, Commonsense About Holidays, School is a Waste of Time!, My Day in London, Something Like a Change!, I'll Tell You What's Wrong with Christmas, Home for the Holidays, William's Christmas Presents, Christmas Day with William, New Year's Day

- Just William at Christmas – 6 unabridged stories about Christmas

William Joins the Carol Singers, A Busy Day, William All the Time, William's Christmas Eve, The Outlaws Fetch the Holly, A Present from William
