= Jane Turpin =

Jane Turpin is a fictional girl character, created by Evadne Price. Most of these stories were published in The Novel Magazine and later compiled in a book form, in the period 1928 to 1947 (roughly the end of World War II). Jane is often referred to as the "female William", a reference to the Just William stories of Richmal Crompton which were very popular at the time.

Jane was depicted as a young child with angelic looks and golden curls, whose looks often belied her intent. Jane was depicted to be of a tomboyish nature, rebelling against authority, and the books usually used situation comedy to generate humour. Jane uses a distinctive lingo. Among her trademark distinctive speech is the substitution of the word "terrible" by the distorted form "terrable".

== Family ==
Jane's family was created by Evadne Price to contain five members - Jane's father, mother, elder sister, Jane herself and baby Henry. Jane's father and mother are usually referred to in the books as "Mr. Turpin" and "Mrs. Turpin", although it is revealed in later books that their names are Henry and Marcia respectively. Jane's elder sister Marjorie ("Marge" to Jane) was a young woman, and hence interested in boys - a fact often exploited to generate situation comedy. Her exact age has never been stated, but since she doesn't seem to go to school like Jane, it can be assumed that she is at least eighteen and possibly older (early twenties perhaps). "Baby" Henry appears later on and was once kidnapped by Jane, Pug and Chaw. Aunts and great-aunts (like Great-Aunt Catherine), usually rather formidable characters, are depicted in the books to have regularly visited the Turpin household. Jane lives under threat of being sent to be "moulded" by her maternal grandparents.

== Constants and recurring characters ==
Jane is shown to live in the suburb of Little Duppery, a small, well-knit suburban community. The time setting of the Jane books are the times of authorship. Primary recurring characters in the Jane books are:

- Vilet the cook: The cook employed by the Turpin household is often shown in Jane stories to be the only person sympathetic to Jane's cause. Jane often refers to Vilet in the stories as the "greatest cook in the world".
- Nana: Jane's nana, who is a hypochondriac, also occurs in numerous stories, but is always referred to as "Nana".
- Arnie the gardener and odd-jobs man: Arnie is employed by the Turpin household as a gardener and odd-jobs man, and is the husband of the cook Vilet. He is also sometimes shown to be mildly sympathetic to Jane.
- "Pug" Washington and "Chaw" Smith: They are Jane's two bosom friends and "henchmen". They usually feature in Jane stories together and frequently work at Jane's bidding. A common situation comedy in Jane books involves all three dressed in their best suits and dresses for some occasion, threatening each other with dire consequences in case they laugh at the other's appearance.
- Amelia Tweeddale: The most well-behaved girl in Little Duppery, she is a source of scorn for Jane and her friends - who refer to her as "Soppy 'Melia". Often held up as a glowing example to Jane, many of the Jane plots feature Jane and her friends plotting the downfall of Amelia. Jane's mother is also shown to be at odds with Amelia's mother.
- Miss Baldock: An elderly spinster who is often present or referred to in the Jane stories. Miss Baldock is universally disliked by most of Little Duppery, not least of all Jane Turpin (who is usually referred to by Miss Baldock as Janie-Panie).

== Parallels to William Brown ==
Scholars have noted similarities to Crompton's Just William series, although Evadne Price "insisted that she had never heard of" those books, even though William stories were regularly advertised on Jane book dust jackets. The famous illustrator Thomas Henry (Thomas Henry Fisher), who illustrated both Jane and William books, even signed the illustrations for the Jane books as "Marriott" so as to distinguish between the two series. Among parallels in the two series :

- Similar background: The characters and settings of the two series are very similar - both William and Jane are depicted as being brought up in British middle class suburbia in the period between the two World Wars. World War II features prominently in both Jane and William books.
- Similar characters: The main protagonists - Jane Turpin and William Brown have been depicted as being around the age of ten, daredevils, rarely subjugated by parental authority or a conformist middle class society and often bad at studies.
- Similar family structure: Both Jane and William were shown to live in small nuclear families with elder siblings (a sister in Jane's case, a brother and a sister in William's case). In both cases, aunts, uncles and great aunts often pay their families a visit, and by being sources of authority and generating antagonism in William or Jane, provide for situation comedy.
- Similar book titles: The first William book was called Just William (1922), while the first Jane book was called Just Jane (1928). The fourth book in the two series were called William the Fourth (1924) and Jane the Fourth (1937) respectively. Book titles like William the Pirate (1932), William the Rebel (1933), and William the Gangster (1934) were mirrored by titles like Jane the Sleuth (1939) and Jane the Patient (1940). When William is shown joining the war effort in books like William Does His Bit (1941), the corresponding Jane title was Jane at War (1947).
- Similar plot elements: Basic recurring plot elements in William and Jane are often the same. These include letting down the family at big social occasions, plotting the downfall of well-behaved model children and taking advantage of their elder sisters' suitors.
- Timeframe of authorship: 39 William books were written in the period 1922 - 1970. Though less prolific as a children's author (Evadne Price wrote hundreds of romantic novels), 10 Jane books were written in the period 1928 - 1947.
- Similar format of publishing: Both the William and Jane books were for the niche children's market of the period. They were even published by the same publisher—Newnes for a while (before Price switched publishers to Robert Hale). At Newnes, both the series were illustrated by the same person - Thomas Henry. Books of the two series had comparable layouts - being hardbound copies with watercolour art on the jacket, art on the spine and the dust jacket spine, being collections of short stories illustrated in the hatch or crosshatch style.

One significant difference in the two series is the absence of an analogue (in the Jane stories) to "The Outlaws" (in the William stories). While Jane has two close friends in Pug Washington and Chaw Smith, she does not command the kind of fidelity that William Brown commanded over the members of his gang - "The Outlaws". Thus, Jane tends to have more solitary adventures compared to William. Jane also does not have a pet in the beginning, unlike William - who had a pet dog Jumble, and was often shown keeping hamsters and white mice as pets (references are made to the cat Toothache which is referred to as Jane's, and Jane does manage to get her dog Popeye in the earlier books in the series).

== Book illustrations ==
Three illustrators primarily illustrated the Jane books - for each of the publishing houses which published the Jane stories (John Hamilton, Newnes, and Robert Hale). Thomas Henry, the first illustrator of the William books, was the illustrator for Newnes, but did not depict Jane as the angelic girl with golden curls. The enduring image of Jane was due to the illustration of Frank R. Grey, who was with the publishing house of Robert Hale. It is worth noting that, even with the handover of Jane copyrights from publishing house to publishing house, the copyrights of the illustrations were not transferred. The first Jane book has thus been illustrated from scratch three times, and the second and third Jane books have been illustrated from scratch twice.

== Complete Bibliography of the Jane series ==
Published by John Hamilton:

- Just Jane (1928)

Published by Newnes:

- Meet Jane (1930)
- Enter - Jane (1932)

Published by Robert Hale:

- Jane the Fourth (1937)
- Jane the Sleuth (1939)
- Jane the Unlucky (1939)
- Jane the Popular (1939)
- Jane the Patient (1940)
- Jane Gets Busy (1940)
- Jane at War (1947)

Published by Macmillan Publishers:

- Jane and Co (1985)
