= Thomas Henry (illustrator) =

English illustrator

Thomas Henry (born Thomas Henry Fisher) (1879–1962) was an English illustrator, best remembered for his illustrations of Richmal Crompton's William books.

== Biography ==
Thomas Henry Fisher was born in 1879 at Eastwood, Nottinghamshire. The oldest of three brothers, he became an apprentice to T. Bailey Forman (Nottingham newspaper proprietors and printers) at the young age of fourteen. Numerous paintings and sketches he made outside contract were used by his employers for publishing merchandise like wall calendars. He concurrently attended the Nottingham School of Art.

His first published works were probably cartoons for the Nottingham Football Post, in September, 1904. He freelanced at the same time under the name of Thomas Henry. Pastel and watercolour were his chosen mediums at that time.

Thomas Henry was associated with the advertising division of Nottingham-based cigarette firm John Players and was reputed to have assisted in the updating of the famous sailor's head, found on the Navy Cut cigarette packet.

He married Gertrude Ellen Mensing from Cotgrave in 1906 and settled down in Plumtree, Nottinghamshire, a neighbouring village on the outskirts of Nottingham. Their daughter Marjorie was born in 1911.

Thomas Henry's rise as an illustrator was fast. By 1913 he was regularly publishing cartoons in top magazines like Punch. By 1920 he was an established illustrator, having published widely in leading publications like the Strand Magazine and London Mail. Henry defined the image of Richmal Crompton's William for magazines in 1919 and followed it up by illustrating the first William book – Just William, which was published in 1922. He went on to illustrate thirty-three William books. Among his other works of this period were illustrations for numerous other children's books like Our Elizabeth Again by Florence A. Kilpatrick. He was also the first illustrator of Evadne Price's Jane stories when they appeared in the Novel magazine between 1927 and 1937. He illustrated the first three collections of Jane stories at the publishing house of Newnes, which folded into IPC Media (now a branch of Time Warner). However, he signed his name as "Marriott", as Evadne Price was eager not to associate the Jane stories and the William stories, and disliked the reference to the character of Jane as the "female William".

Thomas Henry was a prolific contributor as a cover artist and illustrator to children's magazines of the period like The Happy Mag, The Crusoe Mag, The Sunny Mag and Tit Bits Summer Annual. He was also a frequent contributor to children's annuals like Blackie's Boys Annual and The Boys' Budget in the same capacity.

His first wife Gertrude died prematurely in 1932 and a few years later he married his second wife Anne Bailey, with whom he later settled in Old Dalby, Leicestershire.

He also became a successful illustrator of seaside postcards, often saucy ones with double entendres. He started as early as 1913, continuing well into the 1950s. He created a series of postcards for the purpose of fundraising for the National Institute for the Blind, depicting visually handicapped people in poignant situations. He created other sets of postcards, including one of William and his friends, and another depicting a fictitious pair of children – Jane and Herbert.

Thomas Henry died in 1962, leaving illustrations for the current William book – William and the Witch, incomplete. He was influenced by the work of Cecil Aldin. Thomas Henry also had a painting displayed at the Royal Academy.

== William illustrations ==
The first edition of William the Outlaw, illustrated by Thomas Henry – showing cover art

Thomas Henry created the image of William Brown in 1919 for the Home Magazine. It was not based on any particular child, but rather from the author's description and his own imagination. Nearly forty years old at the time, this was the start of a writer-illustrator relationship with Richmal Crompton that lasted until his death forty-three years later. He illustrated William stories in the Home Magazine (1919–1922) and in the Happy Mag (1922 onwards). He illustrated and painted book covers for a total of thirty-three William books for the publisher Newnes. He also produced numerous William strip cartoons for magazines. He drew about eight hundred cartoons of three frames per story for Woman's Own magazine from 1947 to 1962. The illustrations for the magazines were done in a traditional hatch style.

Surprisingly Thomas Henry met Richmal Crompton face-to-face only once, at a book festival luncheon in Nottingham. Their meeting created some publicity, much to his embarrassment. However, Thomas Henry created all the cartoons with the approval of Richmal Crompton, and would consult her if the publisher's storyline was atypical of the character of William Brown.

As William Brown did not age with time, the image of William changed little over forty-three years. However, William's original attire of waistcoat and starched collar was subsequently changed by Henry to a more modern style.

At the time of his death Thomas Henry had only completed some of the drawings for the thirty-fourth book William and the Witch. Hence, some illustration in this book are by Thomas Henry and the rest are by his successor Henry Ford.

== William merchandise ==
Thomas Henry created two William jigsaw puzzles, one William card game, a William magic painting book, a set of William postcards and other merchandise as commercially successful promotion of the William Brown character.

== Selected bibliography ==
- Gullible's Travels in Little-Brit, William Hodgson Burnet, W. Westall, London, 1920
- Just William, 1922
- More William, 1922
- William Again, 1923
- William The Fourth, 1924
- Still William, 1925
- William the Conqueror, 1926
- William The Outlaw, 1927
- William In Trouble, 1927
- William The Good, 1928
- William, 1929
- William The Bad, 1930
- William's Happy Days, 1930
- William's Crowded Hours, 1931
- William The Pirate, 1932
- William The Rebel, 1933
- William The Gangster, 1934
- William The Detective, 1935
- Sweet William, 1936
- William The Showman, 1937
- William The Dictator, 1938
- William and Air Raid Precautions, 1939 (also published as William's Bad Resolutions, 1956)
- William and the Evacuees, 1940 (also published as William and the Film Star, 1956)
- William Does His Bit, 1941
- William Carries On, 1942
- William and the Brains Trust, 1945
- Just William's Luck, 1948
- William the Bold, 1950
- William and the Tramp, 1952
- William and the Moon Rocket, 1954
- William and the Space Animal, 1956
- William's Television Show, 1958
- William the Explorer, 1960
- William's Treasure Trove, 1962
- William and the Witch, 1964
- William and the Pop Singers, 1965
- William and the Masked Ranger, 1966
- William the Superman, 1968
- William the Lawless, 1970
- William the Terrible, BBC Radio Plays volume 1, 2008, published by David Schutte
- William the Lionheart, BBC Radio Plays volume 2, 2008, published by David Schutte
- William the Peacemaker, BBC Radio Plays volume 3, 2009, published by David Schutte
- William the Avenger, BBC Radio Plays volume 4, 2009, published by David Schutte
- William the Smuggler, BBC Radio Plays volume 5, 2010, published by David Schutte
- William's Secret Society, BBC Radio Plays volume 6, 2010, published by David Schutte

NB: Unless otherwise mentioned, the books are written by Richmal Crompton and published by Newnes.
