= William the Outlaw =

Book by Richmal Crompton

- First edition (23rd impression)
- Author: Richmal Crompton
- Illustrator: Thomas Henry
- Language: English
- Genre: Children's literature
- Publisher: Newnes
- Publication date: 1927
- Publication place: United Kingdom
- Media type: Print (hardback & paperback) & Audio book
- Followed by: William in Trouble

William the Outlaw is the seventh book in the Just William series by Richmal Crompton. It was first published in 1927.

== Stories ==
- William the Outlaw—The Outlaws receive an unwanted lecture on geology.
- The Terrible Magician—The Outlaws believe that Mr. Galileo Simkins, a harmless amateur scientist, is really an evil sorcerer.
- Georgie and the Outlaws—The Outlaws' parents discover there is such a thing as a perfect child.
- William Plays Santa Claus—William is given the task of distributing Christmas presents at two separate parties.
- William and the White Elephants—The literal-minded William is thrilled to be put in charge of a white elephant stall - until he learns what a "white elephant" actually is.
- Finding a School for William—Horrified that Mr Cranthorpe-Cranborough, a headmaster, intends to send him away to his boarding school, William sets out to sabotage the plan.
- The Stolen Whistle—William annoys the entire neighborhood with his new dog-whistle.
- William Finds a Job—The Outlaws meet a little girl who claims her father is out of work. They attempt to find him a job - as an artist's model.
- William's Busy Day—A caving expedition leads William into strange territory.
- William is Hypnotised—William takes revenge on the school sneak.
