= John Crompton =

John Crompton may refer to:

- John Crompton (MP), English politician
- John Battersby Crompton Lamburn (1893–1972), British author writing popular science as John Crompton
- Jack Crompton (John Crompton), English footballer

== See also ==
- John Crompton Weems (1778 – 1862), American politician
- Jonathan Crompton, American football quarterback
