= William the Dictator =

Book by Richmal Crompton

- First edition
- Author: Richmal Crompton
- Illustrator: Thomas Henry
- Language: English
- Genre: Children's literature
- Publisher: Newnes
- Publication date: 1938
- Publication place: United Kingdom
- Media type: Print (hardback & paperback) & Audio book
- ISBN: 0-333-46673-X
- Followed by: William and Air Raid Precautions

William — The Dictator is the 20th book of children's short stories in the Just William series by Richmal Crompton.

This book contains 10 stories. It was first published in 1938, and the first published versions are now rare collector's items.

== Stories in short ==
=== He Who Fights ===
William's friends are away at the seaside, and in his boredom, he tries to make friends with Lucinda, newly arrived at the village. Lucinda is friendly with him only to 'show' her neighbour Ralph Montague, a red-haired boy, who had rejected her overtures of friendship, and wants him to fight that boy. William makes friends with Ralph independently though, the two boys being identical in taste and disposition. As they pass Lucinda she goads him to fight Ralph, and they do so. William is worsted, and Lucinda runs off in disgust. The boys continue their friendship to the detriment of the neighbourhood, until their teasing of a group of camping boys brings them to their nemesis. Bruised, they return home, with the excuse that they fought each other. William tries to use this as a means to get back into Lucinda's favours, but as the lady has seen Ralph's worse condition, he only gets attacked for having 'beaten' her idol.

=== What’s In A Name? ===
The discovery of the empty Gorse View gives William hope for running his prize idea — a Boy Sanctuary laden with cakes, biscuits, buns and baths of lemonade — on a commercial basis. While discussing the matter, the Outlaws discover a drill of Fascists in black shirts, and decide to form their own coloured shirt band (The Greenshirts, marked by a green armband). Their manoeuvres are copied by Hubert Lane's Blueshirts, who also proceed on the Fascist agenda of setting up a Colony in Hubert's aunt's house. The Outlaws' attempts at converting Gorse View into their 'Colony' is worsted by its sale. A windfall in the form of a picnic hamper, that fell out of a speeding car outside the house, promises to make their dreams of a Boy Sanctuary come true. While they are in the process of setting it up, the owner of the house turns up. She holds their attention with her tale of theft of her car, and the boy sanctuary is in the meantime raided by her daughter and her friends, who were expecting a party. All ends well as the Outlaws corner the abundant remains of the hamper, as the Laneites are crushed to see the prosperous Outlaw 'Colony'.

=== Agnes Matilda Comes To Stay ===
Mr. Brown's business has a daughter — Agnes Matilda — who comes to stay with the Browns for her health. A thoroughly spoilt child, she is a taxation to Mrs. Brown, but William has been bribed sixpence to stay away from her. On the last day of her stay however, rattled by William's disdain, she chooses to follow him on his trails. His attempts to dodge her fail, and disappointed, he and the Outlaws let her go along. When Ginger refuses to give her her catapult, she attacks him and William fiercely. They run into the Laneites, and William plans the ignominious rout of Hubert lane by a girl. He goads her to ask for Hubert's blow-pipe, and the violence of her attacks puts the Laneites to flight. The Outlaws trick her into a shed and lock her up, where she is discovered by a tramp. She assumes complete command over him, who then tries to get her back home. She is discovered by the Browns who are at that moment receiving her father. The father is happy to see his girl so flushed with health after her adventure, which results in profits for both Mr. Brown and William.

=== A Question Of Exchange ===
The Outlaws decide to do something they've never done before and settle on a television show. William is the good man, Ginger is the bad man, Douglas is the good man's old father, Henry is a policeman and Violet Elizabeth is the girl. She steals her Auntie Maggie's mink fur so she can wear it in the television show. She swaps this with Arabella Simpkin for a fur boa Arabella has stolen from her mother. And when the girls go back home, they have not swapped again. And the victims of the swap believe there is a culprit.

=== William and the Holewood Bequest ===
It is a story where William has to go to aunt Louie and stay with aunt Louie's aunt. At his aunt's house he invents a new method of government, and befriends a moustachioed stranger.
