= William the Detective =

Book by Richmal Crompton

- First edition (ninth impression)
- Author: Richmal Crompton
- Illustrator: Thomas Henry
- Language: English
- Genre: Children's literature
- Publisher: Newnes
- Publication date: 1935
- Publication place: United Kingdom
- Media type: Print (hardback & paperback) & Audio book
- Followed by: Sweet William

William - The Detective is a book in the Just William series written by Richmal Crompton. Modern editions contain ten stories; it originally contained eleven: In a (for the series) rare example of moral panic, the eleventh, entitled "William and the Nasties" has been removed from reprints of the book since 1986 because, though ultimately anti-Nazi, it was considered inappropriate after the atrocities of the Holocaust, especially for a book aimed at children. The story was first published as “William and the Nasties” in Happy Mag, June, 1934 and thus was a fairly early recognition of the dangers of Nazism, coming after Jews were barred from government employment and harassed in other ways, but even before the Nuremberg Race Laws.

On one hand, Crompton describes Mr. Isaacs, the new owner of the local sweet shop, in stereotypically antisemitic terms as a “little hook-nosed man” who is stingy in measuring the sweets William and his friends (the Outlaws) bought—“he stopped putting on sweets as soon as the scale quivered.” Crompton also has one of William's friends report that “the Nasties” in Germany chase out Jews because “Jews are rich,” and that after they chase them out, they take all the stuff they leave behind. The friend goes on to say that Nasties can do this legally in Germany. So William and the other Outlaws decide to become Nasties themselves in order to take all the contents of Mr. Isaacs’ sweet shop.

However, the Outlaws fail in their attempts to intimidate Mr. Isaacs, and Crompton breaks away from stereotypes in telling the rest of the story. Rather than being a passive victim of the Outlaws harassment, Mr. Isaacs defends himself and gives William a good box on the ear as he chases the Outlaws away from his shop. Later, the boys think they have succeeded in locking Mr. Isaacs in his safe-room and start taking his stock of sweets. But as they do, they find “a strange distaste creeping over” them because it 'does seem a bit like "ordinry steelin’" even though it’s “by lor [law]” if you're Nasties.' In short, Crompton clearly suggests here and elsewhere in the story that the contemporary Nazi confiscation of Jewish property is purely criminal activity based on greed and can not be justified by being given the color of law.

In the end, it turns out that the Outlaws have actually captured a burglar attempting to rob Mr. Isaacs, and Mr. Isaacs graciously rewards them with all the sweets they can carry, and tells them he will remember them when they come to buy sweets from him in the future.

"William and the Nasties" is available online, even though it has been dropped from new editions since 1986. William and the League of Perfect Love has also been removed from some editions under pressure from the animal-rights activists it satirises.

== The stories ==
1. William and the Campers
2. William the Invisible – William swears he can discover the secret of invisibility, but finds the task more difficult than he had expected.
3. William the Conspirator – The Outlaws start a campaign for Free Speech.
4. William the Rat Lover – William starts a sanctuary for the protection of rats and even has a Rat Fortnight. But when his costume for Miss Chesterfield's Children's Animal Fete is ruined, they help him without knowing it.
5. William and the Tablet
6. William and the League of Perfect Love
7. Waste Paper Wanted – William and Ginger believe they have accidentally given away an important manuscript belonging to Robert's intellectual friend Ward.
8. William the Persian
9. William and the Monster
10. A Present from William

Removed story: William and the Nasties (originally in sixth position) – William and his friends attempt (unsuccessfully) to imitate Nazi stormtroopers by driving a Jewish shopkeeper from his business. ("Nasties" is William's mispronunciation of "Nazis".)
