= William and the Brains Trust =

Book by Richmal Crompton

- Dust jacket illustrated by Thomas Henry
- Author: Richmal Crompton
- Illustrator: Thomas Henry
- Language: English
- Genre: Children's literature
- Publication date: 1945
- Publication place: United Kingdom
- Media type: Print (hardback & paperback) & Audio book
- Followed by: Just William's Luck

William and the Brains Trust is the twenty-fifth book in the Just William series by Richmal Crompton. It was first published in 1945. It was republished as a paperback (abridged) under the title "William the Hero."

== Stories ==
- "William And The Brains Trust"
- "Mrs Bott's Birthday Present"
- "William And The Mock Invasion"
- "William's War-Time Fun Fair"
- "William and the Tea-Cake"
- "Entertainment Provided"
- "The Outlaws' Report"
- "Soldiers For Sale"
- "Youth On The Prow"
- "Aunt Florence, Toy-Maker"
- "Feasts For Heroes"
- "William Goes Fruit-Picking"
