= William the Good (short story collection) =

Book by Richmal Crompton

- First edition
- Author: Richmal Crompton
- Illustrator: Thomas Henry
- Language: English
- Genre: Children's literature
- Publisher: Newnes
- Publication date: 1928
- Publication place: United Kingdom
- Media type: Print (hardback & paperback) & Audio book
- Followed by: William

William the Good is the ninth book in the Just William series of books by Richmal Crompton. It was first published in 1928.

== Short stories ==
- William- the Good Suspecting his sister Ethel is a kleptomaniac and drunkard, William sets out to "reform" her.
- William- The Great Actor William is enlisted to provide the "special effects" in an amateur theatrical performance.
- William and the Archers When the Territorial Army stage manoeuveres near the village William believes a foreign invasion is underway.
- Willian - the Money Maker The Outlaws are (as usual) short of funds, and William makes a rash promise to rectify the situation.
- William - the Avenger William and Ginger take revenge on a bully whom they believe has been tolerated for too long.
- Parrots for Ethel Ethel is in quarantine and pursued by two like-minded suitors. However, there is a mix-up between the suitor's gifts and the animals for William's zoo.
- One Good Turn William finds himself in the uncomfortable position of being in debt to Robert.
- William's Lucky Day William tries to imitate his hero William Tell - with disastrous consequences.
- A Little Adventure After a spate of burglaries in the village, William and Ginger believe they have found a vital clue.
