= William's Crowded Hours =

Book by Richmal Crompton

- First edition
- Author: Richmal Crompton
- Illustrator: Thomas Henry
- Language: English
- Genre: Children's literature
- Publisher: Newnes
- Publication date: 1931
- Publication place: United Kingdom
- Media type: Print (hardback and paperback) and audio book
- Followed by: William the Pirate

William's Crowded Hours is the thirteenth book in the Just William series by Richmal Crompton. It was first published in 1931.

== The stories ==
- William and the Spy
- The Plan That Failed
- William and the Young Man
- The Outlaws and Cousin Percy Cousin Percy has arrived for Christmas. However, he is too friendly.
- William and the Temporary History Master William is victimized by a new teacher at his school - and takes revenge.
- A Crowded Hour with William
- The Outlaws and The Missionary
- The Outlaws and The Tramp
- William and the Sleeping Major The Outlaws discover an old man asleep in their headquarters. After failing to waken him, they decide to "sell" him Victor Jameson's gang.
- William and the Snowman William throws snowballs at his neighbour, Colonel Fortescue, who strikes their snowman and then believes he has killed Robert. And to make matters worse, Robert is ill.
