= Mary Cadogan =

English author (1928–2014)

Mary Cadogan (née Summersby; 30 May 1928 – 29 September 2014) was an English author. She wrote extensively on popular and children's literature, including biographies of the creator of William Brown from Just William (1922), Billy Bunter.

== Biography ==
Mary Summersby was born on 30 May 1928, in Ealing.

She started working for the BBC before the Second World War and met many of the popular entertainers of the time, and later worked on Schools Programming.

Mary Cadogan's writing career started late but her first book You're a Brick, Angela! was an immediate success. Her articles on the history of children's fiction have appeared in a number of magazines. She wrote a notable biography of Richmal Crompton, who wrote the Just William books. She first met her in the late 1940s, but reported that she was then too shy to ask any questions about her writings.

She was editor of the Just William Society magazine for many years and also edited the Story Paper Collectors' Digest between 1987 and 2005. She was also a member of The London Old Boys' Book Club.

Cadogan died on 29 September 2014, aged 86.

== Awards and honours ==
- Honorary Doctor of Letters from Lancaster University, 2009

== Published books ==
- You're a Brick, Angela! The Girls' Story from 1839-1975 (with Patricia Craig) (1976) (updated and revised edition 1986) ISBN 0-575-03825-X
- Women and Children First: The Fiction of Two World Wars (with Patricia Craig) 1978)
- Richmal Crompton: The Woman Behind William (1986) ISBN 0-7509-3285-6
- The Lady Investigates: Women Detectives and Spies in Fiction (with Patricia Craig) (1986) ISBN 0-19-281938-0
- Frank Richards: The Chap Behind the Chums (1988) ISBN 0-905882-01-6
- Chin Up, Chest Out, Jemima: A Celebration of the Schoolgirls' Story (1989)
- The William Companion (1991) ISBN 0-333-51184-0
- Women with Wings: Female Flyers in Fact and Fiction (1992)
- And Then Their Hearts Stood Still: An Exuberant Look at Romantic Fiction Past and Present (1994)
- Just William Through the Ages (1994) ISBN 0-333-62097-6
- Mary Carries on: Reflections on Some Favourite Girls' Stories (2008)

She also wrote the chapter on girls' comics in the DC Thomson Bumper Fun Book (1977)
