= John Battersby Crompton Lamburn =

British writer (1893–1972)

John Crompton (photographed by Brian Seed, no later than 1958)

John Battersby Crompton Lamburn (3 April 1893 – 1 November 1972) was a British writer of novels and books about natural history.

During World War I, Lamburn served in Rhodesia in the British South Africa Police. Afterwards, he joined a shipping firm in China, where he travelled widely. Returning to England in the 1930s, he took to writing fiction, mainly under the pseudonym "John Lambourne". He may be best known for his fantasy The Kingdom That Was.

In World War II, he served in the RAF. After the war, as "John Crompton", he wrote books of natural history. Most of Lamburn's notes were destroyed in an act of arson, and little is known about him beyond his published works.

== Life and work ==
John Battersby Crompton Lamburn, born 3 April 1893 in Bury, Lancashire, England, was a British writer, the younger brother of Richmal Crompton, a prolific novelist best known for her hugely popular "William" books for boys.

He wrote fiction mainly under the pseudonym "John Lambourne", or "John B.C. Lambourne", and wrote popular books on natural history under the name "John Crompton". He is perhaps best known for his fantasy The Kingdom That Was (1931).

As Trooper 1757 Lamburn, J.B.C. of the British South Africa Police, he served from 19 September 1913 to 30 November 1919, spanning World War I. In both his fiction and non-fiction he drew on his police experiences. (Note: The official BSAP site says nothing of his service. However, this means no more than that he never achieved any special prominence in the service: little is known of the service of most of the troopers of those days.) On leaving the Force he moved to the Far East and travelled widely in China. Returning to England in the 1930s, he took to full-time writing, by now drawing on his experience of travel in East Asia as well.

Little is widely known about Lamburn's life and works, but a few details can be gleaned or inferred from various sources.

According partly to Lamburn's own account of himself, on one of his book covers, he was educated at Bury Grammar School and Manchester University. His father was the Rev Edward John Sewell Lamburn, who apparently intended his son to follow in his own footsteps and go into the Anglican Church; but instead, in 1913 at the age of twenty, Lamburn joined the Rhodesian Mounted Police of the British South Africa Police or BSAP, as a trooper. This might have been to the considerable consternation of his parents, and his age at the time suggests that he did not complete a degree course at Manchester.

Consistently with that suspicion, the second of his two elder sisters was Richmal Crompton Lamburn, a novelist and the author of the hugely popular "William" stories, and she was said to have derived part of her inspiration for her leading character, William Brown — a rough diamond — from her young brother. This all suggests that Lamburn might well have been very unpromising ecclesiastical material, and deeply unenthusiastic about his studies. Certainly some of his autobiographical reminiscences on the vigour and variety of his life in Southern Africa and elsewhere make this plausible; see for example some passages in his book The Hunting Wasp, especially chapters 4 ("Locust and Cockroach Hunters") and 6 ("The Fly Hunters").

He described his fellow-troopers as being about as hard-bitten a crew as it would be possible to find anywhere. He stayed with the BSAP throughout World War I. His duties included patrolling large areas of undeveloped country, and taking charge of isolated up-country out-stations. He found this a glorious life in country as unspoilt as any that Selous hunted. It was full of big game – in his own words: "country we shall see no more".

In 1919 he joined a shipping firm and went to China. For 13 years he operated from Harbin at the north of Manchuria down to Hong Kong in the south. His travels took him to the remotest regions of China. His African and Chinese notes were effectively all destroyed by arson. He generally spent his leave on his own in shooting trips in Portuguese East Africa (present-day Mozambique). In 1932 he resigned from the firm and moved to England. There he married and settled first in Devon, then in Cornwall. Reading between the lines, the rats on the Devon property might well have played a role in persuading him to move to Cornwall.

The study of insects had always been a hobby of his, both in Africa and China. In retirement in England he settled down more earnestly to the pursuit of informal entomology, though, as he observed, with not half so rich a field of subjects as on his travels.

On settling down, he wrote novels (no new departure, as he had already published The White Kaffir, Trooper Fault, and his most celebrated novel, The Kingdom that Was). Strong Waters and The Second Leopard also appeared in 1932, so his apparently idle time in preceding years actually had been anything but idle. Possibly his productivity in writing might have encouraged his retirement and return to England. After settling down he went in for "fairly intensive bee-keeping" as he related in The Hive, one World War later.

That his absence from the trenches of World War I was not attributable to lack of patriotic feeling is apparent from the fact that in 1940 he joined the Royal Air Force. He was then about 47, but Britain was desperate for fighting manpower. In due course he found himself in Iceland as Flight Lieutenant in Flying Control. In September 1943 he was invalided out with a peptic ulcer, a condition for which no decisive treatment was then available. As he put it, he was given leave by the Air Force Council to retain his rank — and unfortunately the ulcer he had contracted as well.

Lamburn died on 1 November 1972 in East Grinstead, West Sussex in England.

== Fiction ==
Apart from the texts themselves, some idea of the character of his novels, and the way in which he drew on his actual experiences, can be gained from occasional reviews. A particularly interesting example, because it comes from an ex-BSAP officer with personal knowledge of the circumstances and some of the characters drawn from, appears in the magazine Transvaal Outpost.

In his review of Trooper Fault, Sloman remarks that most of the characters in the book are fictitious, but that they include some real-life names such as Jimmy Blatherwick and Capell, though he states that the latter never started as an ordinary recruit. Trooper Fault himself has the regimental number 1757, which according to the nominal roll was the number of Trooper John Battersby Crompton Lamburn himself. Of Richmal Crompton's "William" stories, Sloman remarks: "Fortunately for J.B.C. Lamburn these stories were published after his BSAP career had ended, otherwise he could have been ragged rotten!"

Lamburn seems not to have published more fiction after the war.

== Natural history ==
As "John Crompton", Lamburn wrote on natural history from at least as early as 1938. (Note: As an example, "The Queen Bee", an eight-page article in the September 1938 issue of Blackwood's Magazine.)

Crompton made no claim to scientific expertise, and instead described himself as a "layman writing for laymen". Accordingly, the books include occasional slip-ups such as "coastal" (instead of "costal") nervure (though some of these might be printers' errors). Also, many of his views on theoretical matters such as evolution and genetics were naïve even for his day. However, Crompton wrote pleasantly, literately, and intelligently, often quite thoughtfully, on a wide range of biological subjects, and he did so constructively and soundly at a level accessible to a wider and younger public than most popular scientific writing.

Most of Crompton's source material was gleaned from popular and semi-popular material, such as the writings of Jean-Henri Fabre, the Peckhams, Oswald H. Latter, and the like, and he credited such material properly, if informally. Crompton did not stint in expressing his opinions on such sources, though he was neither pretentious nor destructive in his criticism. He was full of praise for Fabre and the Peckhams. He notes in The Spider:

Fabre . . . was disliked by his colleagues. At ease with young people he was tongue-tied with men, and his timid manners did not endear him to them. But the dislike went further. He wrote about science in a way that ordinary people could understand. This was considered to cheapen the profession. He was a born teacher too, and pupils almost fought to attend his classes. Naturally the other masters did not like it, and were ready to take action at the first opportunity.

In spite of his admiration for the greats, Crompton maintained his own views. For example, he had little patience for Fabre's rejection of some of the assertions of classical Darwinism, which attributed all evolutionary change to gradual increments due entirely to random mutations. Fabre ridiculed the idea that this mechanism could explain the hunting wasp's injection of precise quantities of venom into the hidden nerve centres of her victims, for example. "In daring to question the conclusions of Fabre I am, I know, going out of my class. But Fabre the theorist is not Fabre the naturalist . . . His patience and perseverance . . . have brought a rich harvest of knowledge to the world, but that does not mean that we must agree with him when he branches out in other directions." Similarly in the same book Crompton criticises some of Fabre's cruder experiments on instinctive behaviour, and their naïve interpretation.

It is important not to infer any malice in the relationship between Darwin and Fabre from Crompton's writing. No one involved – not Darwin, not Fabre, and certainly not Crompton – suggested that anything more was concerned than a difference of opinion. (Note: Fabre wrote: "though facts, as I see them, disincline me to accept [Darwin's] theories, I have none the less the deepest veneration for his noble character and his scientific honesty. I was drafting my letter when the sad news reached me: Darwin was dead". For his part, Darwin called Fabre "the inimitable observer".)

The alert professional also can glean a lot of useful information from Crompton's personal experiences and those of his correspondents, scientific and non-scientific. He was as willing to quote and credit a country gamekeeper as he was the myrmecologist William Morton Wheeler. (Note: In Ways of the Ant, Crompton frequently cites Wheeler and occasionally quotes him: see the book's index. At the end of chapter 9 ("Battle") of the same book, Crompton reproduces two letters received from a retired gamekeeper, and praises him as "a born describer as well as a born observer".)

A review in Nature of the last of the six books to appear found all six "outstanding for their readability, entertainment and instruction value".

Suggesting that readers who might be acquainted with the "brilliant description" of the nature writers Annie Dillard, Barry Lopez, and John McPhee should "dust aside any current and tony notions you might have about nature writing when you turn to John Crompton's books The Spider and The Snake", Bonnie Bilyeau Gordon warned them to:

Be prepared for careful viewing, but equally for myth. To read these books is to embark on adventure with Crompton all around the world, or at least the British Empire of the early 20th century.

His books have certainly inspired young biologists.

=== Rediscovery of the books ===
Crompton's six books (Note: Some library catalogues suggest that there are more than six, by conflating this John Crompton and some other, most commonly the writer of the books Up the Road and Back (1978), A Fox under My Bed (1979), and more. But the latter was a younger man.) were rediscovered and reissued in the late 1980s.

The novelist William Humphrey mentioned Crompton's The Spider to the publisher Nick Lyons. Copies of this were elusive, but a little later a colleague of Lyons managed to buy a copy of another Crompton book, The Hunting Wasp. He was spellbound by "Crompton's colorfully laconic, decidedly anthropomorphic style". Lyons resolved to republish all six of Crompton's books. But neither the original publisher nor the British Library (Note: Becker writes "the English publisher" and "British Museum". The British publisher of The Hunting Wasp was Collins, but her comments on copyright attribution suggest that she means the American publisher, Houghton Mifflin. The British Museum had hosted the British Museum Library until 1973, when the latter became the British Library.) could help to identify the author; and The Hunting Wasp assigns copyright not to Crompton but to "J. B. C. Lamburn". (Note: The copyright pages of the Collins editions of both The Hunting Wasp and The Spider simply say "Copyright", without specifying the copyright holder. But the 1951 Houghton Mifflin edition of The Life of the Spider assigns copyright to J. B. C. Lamburn; other editions may do so as well.) However, when Nick Lyons Books found a letter from Crompton to an American fan in 1958 they wrote to the address on the letterhead; Lamburn's daughter responded, and the mystery of Crompton's identity was solved.

A review in The Conservationist of the new edition of The Spider credited Nick Lyons Books with the discovery of "a gem of an author".

=== The Hive / A Hive of Bees ===
Crompton's own introduction to The Hive (1947; whose later, American edition was titled A Hive of Bees) ends "if you wish to call me anthropomorphic you may do so. A mere word, even one as long as that, never hurt anyone." Much of Verlyn Klinkenborg's introduction to the 1987 edition is devoted to a robust defence of Crompton's version of anthropomorphism, "[whose] results are enchanting", and an extended example of which:

resembles fine nineteenth-century narrative history, say, Prescott on Peru or Parkman on Quebec, for Crompton here depicts the daily life of a great ancient city of some fifty thousand inhabitants, which is exactly what a hive is.

On its first American publication, the book got a favourable review in Time.

=== The Hunting Wasp ===
A short review of The Hunting Wasp (1948) in The Naturalist praised the author and his book:

His descriptions are both vivid and entertaining, and they cannot fail to enthral anyone unacquainted with the strange habits of these insects; and in spite of his flagrant anthropomorphism the initiated must be very straight-laced not to warm to his graphic writing.

This was tempered by criticism of some slips perhaps resulting from authorial exuberance.

A review in Time praised "this urbane and well-written book"; and another short review described it as "an exciting book which will open up new fields to students of Natural History in all parts of the world".

Writing in Nature, the entomologist Vincent Wigglesworth praised this "popularization anew of the writings of Fabre and the Peckhams . . . written in a vivid and racy style which makes for easy reading".

The review in Scientific American was rather mixed: the reviewer found Crompton "a very good reporter when not romancing": the book "would have been better had he done less sentimental embroidery".

Writing in the New York Times, Edwin Way Teale praised the way Crompton "wanders pleasantly at times" yet returns to his subject. Teale pointed out that Crompton depended heavily for his material on work by Fabre, George and Elizabeth Peckham, and Phil and Nellie Rau, but praised the new book for its freshness.

The reviewer for the Quarterly Review of Biology found the 1955 Houghton Mifflin edition "little improved" from the first edition of 1948: it "remains a dismaying tract of embarrassing absurdity and sciolastic nonsense", by an author seemingly "without a sense of accuracy or logic".

Stephen Bodio's introduction to the 1987 edition is devoted to a robust defence of Crompton's version of anthropomorphism, "[whose] results are enchanting"; he refutes the expectation that the book is an example of "a kind of literate popular science", saying that in this book Crompton is "an eccentric, a storyteller possessed of an unending fascination with the creatures that most people hate", a man tending not to be "analytical, skeptical, and well-versed in the current literature" but instead "a wide-eyed innocent and a man of (a persistent phrase) 'common sense' ", whose anthropomorphism is "a way of making the insects' way of life, as weird as that of Sigourney Weaver's Aliens, comprehensible to the receptive human reader". Bodio continues by praising the humour of Compton's observations on wasps – and adds that "His digressions are amazing."

=== The Spider / The Life of the Spider ===
An unsigned review in Time of The Spider (1950) said that Crompton "writes vividly and with vast enthusiasm".

A review in the New York Times found the book "free of scientific gobbledegook", and likely to impart "new appreciation of spiders".

The review in Nature was mixed, pointing out that the book is "written in a facetious style which some readers will find intolerable; it may, however, persuade some of them to study spiders, not books, more carefully".

The arachnologist B. J. Kaston gave The Life of the Spider a long and detailed review in the Quarterly Review of Biology, concluding that the book, whose author "leans most heavily on Bristowe and on Fabre",

is a curious admixture of good and bad in which the author has assembled much interesting information and has presented it vividly. In this review more emphasis has been placed on the faults, since they are more likely to escape the casual reader than are the creditable features.

In Kaston's view, the faults included anthropomorphism, overgeneralization (despite Crompton's criticism of overgeneralization by others), imprecision, repetition of mere myth, and other inaccuracies.

A review in Annals of the Entomological Society of America says that:

This book leaves the reviewer with somewhat mixed feelings as to its worth. While the author makes a number of excellent observations which he reports in the most objective fashion, on the other hand, he loads the book with biased, unobjective, anthropomorphic, sentimental interpretations. Consequently, any recommendation must be couched in the most careful terms.

Even among Crompton's more interesting treatments, most "contain doubtful facts and useless interpretations which are hopelessly biased by his sentimentality" wrote the reviewer, who concluded that the book was superior to some others, but not Willis J. Gertsch's American Spiders, "that zenith of popular and scientific appraisal".

In a review in the New York Times of the 1987 editions of both The Spider and The Snake (1963), Bonnie Bilyeau Gordon writes that:

Crompton blends great enthusiasm with proper fairness. His voice is direct and chatty and sometimes a bit curmudgeonly. He is also often witty. Take this, for example, written on the family of non-web-weaving spiders that includes the tarantula: "The web-weaver, having patented a clever device, can now sit back and collect the dividends; the wolf spider, unable to think out anything in the way of a snare, has to pay the penalty by leading a hard, strenuous, and dangerous life. . . ."

She added that "the chapter on spider courting is worth the price of both books", quoting Crompton:

Amongst spiders . . . fertilisation of the female is by artificial insemination, but both parties derive as much excitement and pleasure from the act as if it were conducted in what we consider the natural way."

David Quammen describes the author's voice as distinct, "a chatty, confiding voice, cranky at times, disarmingly forthright, and making no claim to scientific authority"; and sometimes "downright unreliable. But never pompous or tedious". He acknowledges that spiders excite fear (as do Hitchcock's films and Stephen King's books); but praises the book for showing that spiders can also be graceful, complicated and surprising.

In Mark Cocker's opinion, this is a "gloriously funny" book.

=== Ways of the Ant ===
Ways of the Ant (1954) received a short, unfavourable review in The British Journal of Animal Behaviour:

[Crompton's] extreme anthropomorphist way of writing seems to kill the very wonder that he hopes to rouse for he falls into the error of using his false human analogy so much that one almost forgets that the book is about ants.

However, its author conceded that "Perhaps this book will lead some people to keep their eyes wider open than usual and check for themselves the observations described."

Reviewing the book for the New York Times, Edwin Way Teale found it "in the main, up to date", and "a serious work written with a light touch", an excellent introduction to ants for the "general reader".

Reviewing it for the Scientific Monthly, the myrmecologist George C. Wheeler wrote that both he and his 12-year-old son had enjoyed a book that was "absorbing, and even fascinating" and written with a "light touch of humor". He was prepared to overlook miscellaneous minor errors, more worried about the imputation of decision, enjoyment, understanding, and even debauchery and orgy to ants; and hoped that a new edition would correct this. Nevertheless, he recommended the book to all, from laymen at one extreme and myrmecologists at the other.

Writing for the 1987 edition, Paul Schullery labels Crompton's approach "egregious anthropomorphism"; and he concedes that "Most of what's in this book isn't even firsthand observation; it's culled from scientific texts Crompton read." So why not, he asks, skip Crompton and go straight to those texts? Because "the magic's in the telling, not in the tale". Like such Victorian adventurers as Burton and Selous, Crompton was a fine raconteur, and one with a particularly developed skill for digressions.

In a short review of this reissue for Library Journal, Annette Aiello called the book "Fascinating, informative, entertaining, and witty"; but she pointed out that, first published over 30 years previously, it was "sadly out of date and inaccurate in many details", and that Crompton's "highly anthropomorphic and moralistic style . . . often obscures his meaning".

=== The Living Sea / The Sea ===
An article in the Sarasota Herald Tribune said of The Living Sea (1957) that:

This is not so scholarly a book as [Rachel Carson's The Sea Around Us], and not so literary a work as [Anne Morrow Lindbergh's Gift from the Sea]. But it is an extremely valuable and readable book, with well-presented facts, many anecdotes and telling observations."

Another favourable newspaper review said that "From monstrous whale to microscopic diatom his narration is lively and charming."

A review in the New York Times called this "a crotchety and poorly written book", but one whose author "is likely to succeed in injecting the reader with not only a good deal of sea information but feeling for nature."

As for more specialist periodicals, the book got a warm review by William Beebe in Natural History:

Mr. Crompton has produced a book quite free from [the activities and weapons that preoccupy others who write about the sea]. He has marshalled hundreds of facts not one of which is new. But he has clothed them in such excellent prose that even the best-known fact takes on a new impelling interest, arousing a persuasive desire to go on reading. The diction is smooth and effortless; it is punctuated with many similes and "as ifs", parentheses are abundant, and the style is subtle and pleasing.

A review in Nature of five more or less popular books about the sea placed The Living Sea among the slipshod majority, inferior to Ralph Nading Hill's Window in the Sea:

I receive the impression that Mr. Crompton has hurriedly read up marine biology in order to write a book on a subject which will sell. . . . That an author should attempt a book on sea life without knowing or finding out what is meant by "plankton" is truly astounding.

The book received a short and dismissive review in Copeia.

=== The Snake / Snake Lore ===
Ellen Hazelwood described The Snake (1963; also titled Snake Lore) in The Naturalist as written "in a very conversational way which anyone even remotely interested in natural history must find easy to read".

Comparing The Snake with The Spider (1950), Bonnie Bilyeau Gordon says that Crompton, writing while in Britain and thus with very few snakes to study, presents "mythology and regional lore as a substitute for hands-and-knees observation". Complete with "more of Crompton's rambling speculation", the newer work "is more truly a storybook, and riddled with mildly gruesome stories at that: slow death, odd experiments".

A short review in Animal Behaviour called this "lucid and easily read book" "only a superficial introduction to the subject of snakes".

The "sloppily written" Snake Lore received a very unfavourable review in Natural History from the herpetologist Charles M. Bogert, ending:

This anecdotal account can be recommended only for readers who buy books they can ill afford to take time to read. Snake Lore will not add to their frustrations, for they will have no qualms about putting it down. Better still, they might leave it unopened.

The reviewer for Nature found the book as good as its five predecessors; and "erroneous statements are few".

Writing for its 1987 reissue, David Quammen described the book as entertaining but "perhaps the most idiosyncratic" of Crompton's six: "It is less a classic of natural-history writing than a pot-pourri of garish stories", as the "unconventional, endearing devotion" with which Crompton viewed miscellaneous creatures commonly regarded as repulsive is less apparent in this book than elsewhere. Quammen concludes that the book "may not be science, but it's fun".

== Bibliography ==
=== Fiction bibliography ===
By John Lambourne, John B.C. Lambourne, or John Crompton.

- The White Kaffir (1927)
- The Kingdom that Was (1931, 1939)
  - The Kingdom that Was. London: Tom Stacey, 1971. ISBN 978-0-85468-074-0. (Note: The 1971 edition(registration required) of The Kingdom that Was at the Internet Archive.)
  - Het verloren rijk. Utrecht: Het Spectrum, 1975. ISBN 9789027408181. Dutch translation.
- Trooper Fault. London: John Murray, 1931. OCLC 32302820.
- Strong Waters (1932)
  - Strong Waters. London: John Murray, 1934. OCLC 32302820.
- The Second Leopard (1932)
  - The Second Leopard. London: John Murray, 1936. OCLC 30572882.
- The Unmeasured Place (1933)
  - The Unmeasured Place. London: John Murray, 1935. OCLC 32111406.
- Inky Wooing (1935) (Note: Inky Wooing appears from the list of contents of volume 151 (1935) of The Cornhill Magazine to have been serialized in volumes 150–151. "Index by name: Page 6031" (as accessed on 8 March 2025) of The FictionMags Index (ed. Phil Stephensen-Payne) specifies that instalments appeared in each month's issue from August 1934 to March 1935.)
  - Inky Wooing. London: John Murray, 1936. OCLC 1113491237.
- Squeeze: A Tale of China (1935)
- Trooper in Charge (1939)

=== Natural history bibliography ===
By John Crompton.

- The Hive. Edinburgh: Blackwood, [1947]. Illustrated by Alfred Bestall. OCLC 1634751.
  - A Hive of Bees. Garden City, New York: Doubleday, 1958. OCLC 1449232.
  - Geliebtes Bienenvolk: Ein Bienenfreund erzählt. Zürich: Origo, 1959. OCLC 437255456. German translation.
  - Een korf vol bijen: De bekering van een bijenhater. Amsterdam, [1959]. OCLC 64105530. Dutch translation.
  - A Hive of Bees. New York: Nick Lyons, 1987. ISBN 0-941130-50-9. With an introduction by Verlyn Klinkenborg. (Note: The 1987 edition(registration required) of A Hive of Bees at the Internet Archive.)
- The Hunting Wasp. London: Collins, 1948. OCLC 557922756. (Note: The 1948 edition(registration required) of The Hunting Wasp at the Internet Archive.)
  - The Hunting Wasp. Boston: Houghton Mifflin, 1955. OCLC 1007486683.
  - The Hunting Wasp. New York: Nick Lyons, 1987. ISBN 0-941130-49-5. With an introduction by Stephen Bodio. (Note: The 1987 edition(registration required) of The Hunting Wasp at the Internet Archive.)
- The Spider. London: Collins, 1950. OCLC 1558154. (Note: The 1950 edition(registration required) of The Spider at the Internet Archive.)
  - The Life of the Spider. Boston: Houghton Mifflin, 1951. OCLC 1035895426. With an introduction by Alexander Petrunkevitch. (Note: The 1951 edition(registration required) of The Life of the Spider at the Internet Archive.)
  - L'Araignée. Paris: Corrêa, 1951. OCLC 458988662. French translation.
  - Spindlar. Stockholm: Åhlén & Åkerlunds, 1952. OCLC 20142939. Swedish translation.
  - Die Spinne: Eine unbekannte Welt um uns. [Berlin]: Blanvalet 1953. OCLC 165066176. German translation.
  - I ragni. [Milan]: Garzanti, 1953. Italian translation.
  - The Life of the Spider. New York: Mentor, 1954. OCLC 1979220.
  - Life of the Spider. London: Fontana, 1955.
  - Edderkopper bringer lykke. 1956. OCLC 476836665. Danish translation.
  - Život pavouka. Prague: Orbis, 1976. OCLC 820775767. Czech translation.
  - The Spider. New York: Nick Lyons, 1987. ISBN 0-941130-29-0. With an introduction by David Quammen. (Note: The 1987 edition(registration required) of The Spider at the Internet Archive.)
- Ways of the Ant. Boston: Houghton Mifflin, 1954. OCLC 1335466. Illustrated by J. Yunge-Bateman, 1954.
  - Ways of the Ant. New York: Nick Lyons, 1987. ISBN 0-941130-84-3. With an introduction by Paul Schullery. (Note: The 1987 edition(registration required) of Ways of the Ant at the Internet Archive.)
- The Living Sea. London: Collins, 1957. Illustrated by Denys Ovenden. OCLC 752498042.
  - The Living Sea. Garden City, New York: Doubleday, 1957. (Note: The 1957 Doubleday edition(registration required) of The Living Sea at the Internet Archive.)
  - La Mer vivante. Paris: Buchet-Chastel-Corrêa, 1958. OCLC 460056932. French translation.
  - The Sea. New York: Nick Lyons Books, 1988. ISBN 0-941130-83-5. With an introduction by Robert F. Jones.
- The Snake. London: Faber & Faber, 1963. OCLC 12558742.
  - Snake Lore. Garden City, New York: Doubleday, 1963. OCLC 1687647. (Note: The 1963 Doubleday edition(registration required) of Snake Lore at the Internet Archive.)
  - Slanger. [Copenhagen]: Schultz, 1965. OCLC 61070187. Danish translation.
  - The Snake. New York: Nick Lyons, 1987. ISBN 0-941130-28-2. With an introduction by David Quammen. (Note: The 1987 edition(registration required) of The Snake at the Internet Archive.)

== Sundry details ==
During his time in Iceland, Lamburn, the putative original for "William" of the Richmal Crompton books, came into contact with Air Commodore Cecil George Wigglesworth, thought to be the original for "Biggles" of the stories by W. E. Johns.

Sloman mentioned that David John Crompton Lamburn (presumably a son) attested in the BSAP on 5 May 1952 as Constable 4917 and was discharged on 4 May 1955. He added that members serving in Bulawayo in the 1950s recalled him but, again, all attempts failed to locate him at the time of Sloman's writing.

In his book The Hunting Wasp, Lamburn refers to "a child two years old" during the 1930s. This is consistent with a son in the BSAP in the 1950s. Elsewhere he refers to a daughter of "nearly five" (no date given).
