= Still William =

Book by Richmal Crompton

- First edition
- Author: Richmal Crompton
- Illustrator: Thomas Henry
- Language: English
- Genre: Children's literature
- Publisher: Newnes
- Publication date: 1925
- Publication place: United Kingdom
- Media type: Print (hardback & paperback) & audio book
- Followed by: William the Conqueror

Still William is the fifth book in the Just William series by Richmal Crompton. It was first published in 1925.

== The stories ==
- The Bishop's Handkerchief – There is a craze for silk handkerchiefs in the village, and William will stop at nothing to get one.
- Henri Learns the Language – A young Frenchman arrives in the village, intent upon learning colloquial English. William's attempts to teach him lead to chaos.
- The Sweet Little Girl in White – William is forced to play at "fairies" with an odious and domineering little girl. Little does he know what effect this will have. (This was the first ever story to feature Violet Elizabeth Bott, who appears frequently in later tales.)
- William Turns Over a New Leaf – William's attempts to aid his brother Robert's romantic activities are undermined by Robert's failure to include surnames in his love poetry.
- A Bit of Blackmail – The Outlaws use underhand methods to force the stout Mr. Bott to change his mind about whether to fire Bob Andrews.
- William the Money-Maker – William and his friends organize an exhibition, but Violet Elizabeth is determined to get in on the act.
- The Haunted House – The Outlaws' midnight feast lead to rumors of the supernatural among the Society for the Encouragement of Higher Thought.
- William the Match-Maker – William chooses village eccentric Mr. March as a potential suitor for his sister Ethel.
- William's Truthful Christmas – Following the vicar's advice, William decides to "cast aside deceit and hypocrisy" and speak the truth. He soon finds that "the truth" is the last thing anyone wants to hear.
- An Afternoon with William – William and Ginger believe they have found an undiscovered tribe of savages.
- William Spoils the Party – The Outlaws kidnap a politician about whom William's father has been complaining.
- The Cat and the Mouse – Having been victimized by the new chemistry master, William finds a way to get even.
- William and Uncle George – William acquires a pair of horn-rim spectacles.
- William and Saint Valentine – William falls for an "older woman".
