= William and the Masked Ranger =

Book by Richmal Crompton

- First edition
- Author: Richmal Crompton
- Language: English
- Genre: Children's literature
- Publisher: Newnes
- Publication date: 1966
- Publication place: United Kingdom
- Media type: Print (hardback & paperback) & Audio book
- Preceded by: William and the Pop Singers
- Followed by: William the Superman

William and the Masked Ranger is a book of short stories in the Just William series by Richmal Crompton. It was first published in 1966.

== The Stories ==
- William and the Masked Ranger
- William's Summer Holiday
- William and the Donkey
- Douglas's Great Experience
- William and the Art Club
- The Play's the Thing
