= William's Television Show =

Book by Richmal Crompton

- First edition
- Author: Richmal Crompton
- Illustrator: Thomas Henry
- Language: English
- Genre: Children's literature
- Publisher: Newnes
- Publication date: 1958
- Publication place: United Kingdom
- Media type: Print (hardback & paperback) & Audio book
- Followed by: William the Explorer

William's Television Show was a book in the Just William series by Richmal Crompton. It was first published in 1958, and contained six short stories, far fewer than most books in the series.

== The Stories ==
- William on the Trail
- William Takes the Lead
- William Among the Chimney-Pots
- William's Thoughtful Acts
- William's Television Show
- William Does a Bob-a-job
- William and the Wedding Anniversary
- William and the National Health Service
