= William in Trouble =

1927 book by Richmal Crompton

- First edition (22nd impression)
- Author: Richmal Crompton
- Illustrator: Thomas Henry
- Language: English
- Genre: Children's literature
- Publisher: Newnes
- Publication date: 1927
- Publication place: United Kingdom
- Media type: Print (hardback & paperback) & Audio book
- Followed by: William the Good

William in Trouble is a book in the children's Just William series by Richmal Crompton. The book contains 10 short stories. It was first published in 1927.

== The Stories ==
=== William and the Early Romans ===
The village is excited when a group an Archaeological Society finds remains of a real Roman Villa in the valley near the village. The Outlaws go to visit the excavation site, but after a while the excitement begins to pall. So William decides to shoot one of the coins that has been excavated with his slingshot- however, he misses and hits the leader of the excavation in the small of the back, and he yells. The Outlaws then, fearing reprimand, run away. The next day is a half-holiday, and William decides to set up his "own" excavation, fully expecting he can find his own Roman villa nearby. They set up the other side of the Archeological Societies excavation, and pretend to find remains of a Roman Villa (when all they are actually finding are coins that William has been throwing down in the soil). He soon attracts a crowd and the real excavation loses its spectators.

However, before he can continue any further he is chased away by Farmer Jenks. He comes home, and finds the little old man he shot earlier is at his house, staying with his father! Luckily, the man is short sighted and does not recognise him. The story ends comically with the old man's and William's "finds" being mixed up, where the old man describes things such as William's soap dish as being "a most rare item of great value" to a hall full of people.

=== William and the Fairy Daffodil ===
The story starts with Ginger describing a book he got after being to the dentists, called "The Jungle Explorers", where the natives roam in the jungle doing all sorts of things the Outlaws are never allowed to do, such as never going to the dentist or brushing their hair. They decide to go find some of the natives in the local forest. In the end they give up their search, and play a game of hide and seek. William runs off and finds a main road. He jumps in a motor car parked nearby – however, people get in the car and he has to hide himself under some sheets. He is driven to a far away place that he is not familiar with. A woman calls him into her school, under the impression he is the gardener's boy. She asks him to sit down while the class of girls draw him, as the model she had arranged for hadn't turned up. Most of the girls are rude to him, but one small one at the back is nice to him. He goes over to her and begins talking to her, telling her about all the adventures he has been on, such as "having a tooth out without gas". She doesn't reply and begins crying – she's homesick and wants to go home to her mother, but there is a play on today and she will be caught before she can get to the station and go home to her mother.

William helps her by acting as her part in the play – a fairy. William plays the part very badly- tripping over everything in front of a hall full of people from the village (his family is also in the crowd). As he trips up, his headgear falls off: he is instantly recognised by his mother and father and half the village. At the end, he is pursued by half the school. However, it all turns out okay as the girl he helped is the daughter of one of his father's business friends.

=== William and the Chinese God ===
William, for a dare, steals a small "Chinese god" figure from his headteacher's house. He has to hide the figure from his mother, so he hides it on his drawing room mantelpiece. However, his headteacher (Mr. Marks), comes over to tea and notices it, and becomes very interested in it. Mrs. Brown gives it to him, much to William's horror. He gets it back and hides it again, in his neighbours house, Mr. Marks finds it again, but thinks that it is just one similar to his own. William gets in a muddle as he hides it, and eventually gives it (twice) to Mr. Marks. In the end, when Mr. Marks finds out that there was only one all along, he turns to ask William about it – but he's gone.

=== All the News ===
It's raining and the outlaws are at a loss for what they can do. Eventually, they decide to make a newspaper. Violet Elizabeth, the daughter of Mrs. Bott, comes in and begins to "help" them. They want her to go away (as they always do), however she doesn't. Eventually she goes out, much to the relief of the outlaws, who continue working on the newspaper, but comes back with a man's wallet, saying she did it because you need to have crime in a newspaper. The man comes back to retrieve his wallet, when Ethel (William's sister, and also the girl the man is in love with), enters, and a few photos of Ethel fall out of the man's wallet- the Outlaws and Violet Elizabeth are let off the hook, and the rain has stopped – so they go outside and resume their normal outdoor activities.

=== William's Mammoth Circus ===
Joan, William's only friend who is a girl, is coming back after a long time away from them. The Outlaws, who all approve of Joan, decide to make a celebration for her- so they decide to do a circus. They decide to do the circus in Rose Mount School, which is empty (as it is the holidays). The rehearsal isn't a success, but they go on anyway. On the evening before the actual show for Joan, they bring all the animals for the circus – an annoyed cat, called Rameses, a clockwork monkey, Jumble and Douglas' Aunt's Parrot. They tiptoe past the caretaker, but then all the animals start making noises, so they have to hurry up. They hide the animals in different rooms, so that "even if she (the caretaker) does find one she won't find them all". On the day of the show, the school is unexpectedly full up of people. Their animals are still inside, so what do they do now? They attempt to get inside the school, but fail. They find out that the school is being used for the "Study of Psychical Philosophy" group.

The leader of the group goes down to the cellar, hearing the parrot, believing it is an apparition. The parrot says "Stop". She stops. Then the parrot says, "Oh, Beware", and she runs up stairs and the parrot laughs. She asks if anybody else has heard something in the night- and they all have (they have heard the animals the Outlaws hid in the school), and they believe that the house is full of ghosts who are unfriendly to them, so they leave, allowing the Outlaws to do their "circus" for Joan with no trouble- and she loves it, and it's a success.

=== The Magic Monkey ===
The Outlaws watch some girls playing hockey – so they make up their own kind of hockey with upside down walking sticks. They enjoy the game and play it whenever they get a chance- and other children see the Outlaws playing it, and start to do it as well. In less than a week, the entire village's population of boys is playing it. The only people who refuse to play it are Hubert Lane and his gang (they are the Outlaws enemies). Hubert Lane and the Outlaws organise a match. The Outlaws arrive before the match, and spot Hubert and his best friend hiding all the good food that had been organised for the match, and leaving the bad, not-as-good food out for the Outlaws.

Later, after the match, the Outlaws and Hubert Laneites go to eat the food. The Outlaws pretend to have a "magic monkey" (which is in fact simply Henry's sister's toy monkey) and find all the food that Hubert Laneites had hid there. The Laneites are so surprised at this they really believe it is a magic monkey. Then William says that "if you dunk Bertie Franks and Hubert Lane in the rain tub 3 times, you will get a penknife and a magnifying glass- but they mustn't look first." So they all do it, and they find them. The Outlaws are happy because they're now equal with Hubert Lane.

=== William Among the Poets ===
Robert, William's Brother, has just recovered from influenza. He has "discovered" poetry and reads it aloud to himself all the time, believing it is the best thing in the world. The outlaws watch him from the bushes, laughing at him all the time. The next day Robert has stopped reading it aloud, so they go off and play their games. However, the games aren't as fun because they are wondering if Robert is doing anything funny- so they go off to find him. They find him attempting to make a Poetry society, where he makes a rule that all of the people in the society must make a piece of poetry every week. The Outlaws keep all the members of the poetry society under close watch. The next week, when the society reassembles, each of the members read out their poem. Two of the poems aren't very good, and Robert's does okay, but Oswald's knocks them all out of the water with a fantastic poem. Because of this, William's enemies laugh at him and tease him about his brother Robert. The next time the Poetic group gets together, it becomes clear to the reader that Oswald is actually cheating by using people's poems that have already been written – however the other members have never heard of these poems so they don't know this.

One of the members knows of a poetry competition, and suggests that they all enter it to see if any of them win. They all enter. In the end, Oswald is shown up as the cheater that he is and Robert wins the prize.

=== William at the Garden Party ===
William is feeling grateful towards Robert – Robert gave him some money, in a good mood, so he could pay for his air rifle to be repaired. So William decides that he must help Robert out somehow in return. He decides to get Robert his cup back, which through a misunderstanding was now in the Vicar's possession. He gets into the Vicar's house and is mistaken for a boy who can play the piano very well. So he plays for them- and not very well at all. He is given refreshments before he leaves, and he takes the cup secretly away from them and puts it in Roberts room. When he goes home, the Vicar is there – and recognises him as the boy who played the piano, so he decides to stay and listen to William. (He did not hear him the first time). Suddenly, the Vicar notices a cup- a cup with his son's name engraved on it. William did not know that the two cups had been moved around in the house, so he had brought back the wrong one.

=== William Joins the Waits ===
Mr. Solomon is going to take some boys carol singing, and the Outlaws are forced to go along with him. They don't want to, but when they find out that some of the areas they are going to go singing are near people who have given them bad presents, they decide to take over the show and start to sing songs to them (for example, Uncle George had given Ginger a book called 'Kings and Queens of England', and to pay back for it he went to his house with the other 16 or so boys and sung bad songs at the top of his voice). When he goes to Aunt Jane's to sing badly to her to make up for the bad presents, she mistakes the singing for a pack of hungry wolves (she is very old and has trouble hearing). She leans out the window with a gun, ready to shoot, much to William's surprise. He coaxes her to put the gun away and use it as a last resort, and she agrees. William has an idea, and pretends that the color green scares away wolves- so he finds his green tie (which Aunt Jane gave him for a present), and throws it outside pretending it scares them away. (The story William Plays Santa Claus in William the Outlaw follows on from this tale, describing Mr. Solomon's attempts to complain about William's behaviour that night.)

=== William to the Rescue ===
The Outlaws have been given a tin of sardines- and they devise a new game called "Canniballs". They tie the sardine to the tree and pretend it's Ginger- and Ginger hides behind a bush doing the voice of himself. They then eat the sardine, still pretending it's Ginger, and proceed to the next one. As he goes in for lunch, he hears Ethel rehearsing a play, saying 'I don't want to marry him! I'm being forced to marry him!'. William believes this is for real, and attempts to help her.

He finds the man who he thinks she is being forced to marry, and takes him to a hill and says "Ethel's dead". He believes it is really true and is very upset, and it gets into a very big muddle. In the end, William runs away after he discovers it was all a mistake.
