= William and Air Raid Precautions =

Book by Richmal Crompton

- First edition (third impression)
- Author: Richmal Crompton
- Illustrator: Thomas Henry
- Language: English
- Genre: Children's literature
- Publisher: Newnes
- Publication date: 1939
- Publication place: United Kingdom
- Media type: Print (hardback & paperback) & Audio book
- Followed by: William and the Evacuees

William and Air Raid Precautions is the 21st book of children's short stories in the Just William series by Richmal Crompton. This was one of the books set against the backdrop of World War II.

== Short stories ==
1. William and A.R.P.
2. William's Good-Bye Present
3. William's Day Off
4. Portrait of William
5. William the Dog Trainer
6. William and the Vanishing Luck
7. William's Bad Resolution
8. William and the Badminton Racket
9. William and the Begging Letter
