= William the Conqueror (short story collection) =

1926 book by Richmal Crompton

- First edition (sixth impression)
- Author: Richmal Crompton
- Illustrator: Thomas Henry
- Language: English
- Genre: Children's literature
- Publisher: Newnes
- Publication date: 1926
- Publication place: United Kingdom
- Media type: Print (hardback & paperback) & Audio book
- Followed by: William the Outlaw

William the Conqueror is the sixth book in the Just William series by Richmal Crompton. It was first published in 1922. It is a book of short stories, and its name is a pun on William the Conqueror, a famous king of England.

== Short stories ==
- Enter the Sweep - William takes possession of a delightful pile of soot – and causes mischief.
- A Birthday Treat - The Outlaws stage a "waxworks" show as a birthday treat for Ginger's beautiful aunt. However, there is a mix-up over the venue.
- The Leopard Hunter - Mr. Falconer, an old acquaintance of William's father comes to stay and annoys everyone with his incessant boasting. William devises a clever plan to get rid of him.
- William Leads a Better Life - The Outlaws are inspired to follow the example of St. Francis of Assisi, but find this more difficult than they had expected.
- William and the Lost Tourist - An American visitor to the village mistakes William for a descendant of William Shakespeare.
- The Midnight Adventure of Miss Montague - William attempts to steal his things that Miss Frame's new tenant, Miss Montague, has confiscated
- The Mysterious Stranger - William and his friends believe a newcomer to the village is the villain from a novel they have been reading.
- The Sunday-School Treat - William believes he has discovered a conspiracy to murder his sister Ethel.
- William the Philanthropist - The Outlaws (with the unsolicited help of Violet Elizabeth) emulate Robin Hood, robbing from the rich and giving to the poor.
- William the Bold Crusader - Inspired by the curate's talk on the Crusades, William stages a "crusade" of his own against "heretics" (namely the local nonconformist Sunday-school) and worshippers of "idylls".
- The Wrong Party - After the Hubert Lanites ruin William's party, the Outlaws attempt to get their revenge.
- William Starts the Holidays - Despite his best intentions, William manages to wreck Robert and Ethel's Christmas party.
- Revenge Is Sweet - William's gang finally takes revenge on the Hubert Lanites.
