= Over to William =

1956 British television series

Over to William is an ITV sitcom that aired in 1956. It is a live TV adaptation of the Just William short stories. It was produced by Associated Television (ATV) and starred Keith Crane, Michael Saunders, John Symonds, and Meurig Wyn-Jones. All 13 episodes are missing, believed lost.
