= More William =

Book by Richmal Crompton

- First edition
- Author: Richmal Crompton
- Illustrator: Thomas Henry
- Language: English
- Genre: Children's literature
- Publisher: Newnes
- Publication date: 1922
- Publication place: United Kingdom
- Media type: Print (hardback & paperback) & audio book
- Followed by: William Again

More William is the second William collection in the much acclaimed Just William series by Richmal Crompton. It is a sequel to the book Just William. The book was first published in 1922, with a current edition published in 2005 by Macmillan Children's books.

== Contents ==
Like most of the William books it has no continuous narrative, but consists of separate independent short-stories. The stories are as follows:

- A Busy Day

William is given a book entitled Things a Boy Can Do and annoys his entire household by trying to carry out its instructions, along with Jimmy, a cousin with a sister called Barbara.

- Rice-Mould (The first ever story, c.1919)

In order to impress the little girl next door, William attempts to steal cream blancmange from the household kitchen.

- William's Burglar

William befriends a mysterious stranger who claims to be a war veteran, but who is quite obviously a criminal.

- The Knight at Arms

A Quixote-esque tale in which "Sir William" and his faithful "squire" Ginger set out to rescue a "damsel in distress".

- William's Hobby

William takes up taxidermy as a hobby and puts a dead frog that he wishes to stuff in Uncle George's tea for 'Tannin'.

- The Rivals

William has a rival for the affections of Joan.

- The Ghost

William arranges a "psychic experience" for his cousin Mildred.

- The May King

William is chosen as attendant to the May Queen (Evangeline Fish, a girl despises) in a school pageant, but he has bigger ambitions.

- The Revenge

William takes revenge on his family by pretending to run away from home.

- The Helper

William "helps" the removal men when his family moves house and gets stuck on the roof.

- William and the Smuggler

Mr. Brown goes to the seaside for a "rest cure" but unfortunately has to endure William's company.

- The Reform of William

William is inspired to lead a better life, but decides not to start just yet and on his 'last day' of his 'old life', crashes a caravan into a donkey cart.

- William and the Ancient Souls

A grown-up friend of William has his life made unendurable by a new neighbour who is the President of the society of Ancient Souls.

- William's Christmas Eve

William and Joan deliver a Christmas feast to a poor family whose man of the house has just been released from 'The Nick'
