= William the Lawless =

Book by Richmal Crompton

- First edition
- Author: Richmal Crompton
- Cover artist: Henry Ford
- Language: English
- Genre: Children's literature
- Publisher: Newnes
- Publication date: 1970
- Publication place: United Kingdom
- Media type: Print (hardback & paperback) & Audio book
- Preceded by: William the Superman
- Followed by: -

William the Lawless was the last story collection in the William Books series. It was published posthumously in 1970 following the death of the author, Richmal Crompton, in 1969.

In one story William helps an old man with his neglected garden by taking plants from his sister's rockery without permission. William and the Outlaws later attempt to obtain a wedding gift for their form master, leading to complications. The collection also features the return of the character Archie and a story centered on General Moult's 90th brithday, where the General compares his happiness to the Relief of Mafeking.
