= William Does His Bit =

1941 book by Richmal Crompton

- First edition (sixth impression)
- Author: Richmal Crompton
- Language: English
- Genre: Children's literature
- Publisher: Newnes
- Publication date: 1941
- Publication place: United Kingdom
- Media type: Print (hardback & paperback) & Audio book
- OCLC: 810795579
- Followed by: William Carries On

William Does His Bit is the 23rd book of children's short stories in the Just William series by Richmal Crompton.

This book contains 10 stories. It was first published in 1941, and the first published versions are now collectors' items and relatively rare.

Like its immediate predecessors and the next two installments this book contains the central theme of World War II and the war effort, which was being fought at the date of this book's original publication.

== Plot ==
=== William Does His Bit ===
William hears the family talk about a man called Quisling (William calls him 'Grisling'), who apparently appears to exist in many places at once, helping the Germans. When he learns the man is in fact many men doing the same thing, he sets out to find Quisling and capture him. His search takes him to the village, where at an intersection, two elderly ladies are talking about passwords in whispers. William at once decides to follow the second one, who goes to a school building through the cover of laurel bushes and at a blackened window, William sees an elderly gentleman with many women talking and putting flags on maps. He, believing it to be Grissel's gang plotting propaganda after he hears them make calls about disasters, follows the man to his house, and when he starts mowing his lawn, he rings the police asking them to come, due to stories where the hero is captured but the police come in the nick of time. William is caught "stealing" plates and cutlery so he can see where Grissel's papers are. The police start to arrest him, as William talks about the man and his doing. The man dismisses the police, rewarding William for his "efforts to the country" with money, a bun and lemonade. William walks home contentedly and tells his mother what happened. His mother does not believe him, and continues sewing.

=== William The Highwayman ===
William decides that he and Ginger should become highwaymen to steal some money to account for money that was lost by them, and by William's bike being removed because he trampled flowers over with it. William and Ginger dress up as what they think highwaymen look like. Their first attempts are useless, but then they steal a man's briefcase, believing it to be full of treasure. It turns out it is full of rocks. Ethel is starting a rockery, and William sells them to her for six pennies. A gentleman visits who happens to be the girl's relation, and says that highwaymen held up his car. William is found out, but all ends well when he sees a movie about highwaymen with the gentleman.

=== Boys Will Be Boys ===
The Brown family is getting stressed out at William's presence. They decide he must be given to one of his relations for a while to keep. William at first is indignant about being kept by his aunt, then he discovers the village she lives in isn't so dull after all... Two elderly gentleman, a colonel and another man find themselves bickering like they did the year before, and the one before that and so on, about their prizes. One breeds good asparagus, and one good peaches. Both vow to win the other's best offerings and grow those plants. William gets most mixed up in the happenings, accidentally wrecking their plants. The men's anger at William is assuaged when the contest is called off due to war, and decides after his adventures with them, not to be too detailed to his mother about what happened.

=== William The Fire Man ===
The outlaws, who often frequent the Village and Marley, notice that a fire "station" has been built out of an old garage. The outlaws watch in awe, as "god like beings" walk in "thigh high boots" carrying hoses and dripping in endless water. At first, the gang of schoolboys find themselves merely waiting on the outside and watching the amazing happenings. Then, they dare to venture in. The men even find their company nice for a while, until William's band decide to join. That's where it all goes wrong. The officer of the area, Mr Perkins, decides that schoolboys shouldn't be parading with his men, and turn them out. But William is not finished yet. His band make their OWN fire squad area next to the garage in a spot of unused land that waits for them conveniently. When Perkins uses a new tactic to get them away, after he is shot in the face by one of the outlaws with a hose, he says he will talk to their fathers. William finds a fire, however after a while, but it is in PERKINS house! When the section officer's superior finds out, William is reluctantly rewarded.

=== William Makes A Corner ===
The household bustles with the sounds of the words "war" and "economy", most often joining to form "war economy". William, trying in vain to persuade his mother that leaving school would save money, and that he would go back after the war (historical note, book was written in 1941, meaning the war would end in about 4 years, William being eleven). He asks the cook if she knew about war economy. Aside from stealing the odd couple of raisins (which later ended in a comical sequence of the Brown's saying how few raisins were in their raisin puddings), he manages to get Cook to tell him about "corners" of produce made by "war profiteers" who gain money from wars. William decides to make a "corner" of wood, since there is a wood nearby his home. He takes it to the house of a Builder, and finds a scared women there, fretting over her war time recipes, which happen to include directions that don't even make sense to her. She tells William to put his "wood corner" in the living room. But it is not Mr. Jones the builder who lives here, rather Mr. Jones the fretwork creator!!! Obviously taking a "wood corner" to be a piece of a chair or something, she hurriedly assumes William has every right to dump his barrow into the living room. The woman's relations have been skipping from place to place, eventually bleeding all their relations dry, and Mrs. Jones is no different. When William outrages Mr. Jones with his "corner" of sticks and twig sized branches of common firewood, Mrs. Jones is however quite glad to see them leave for another unfortunate relation! She eventually gives William a Stilton Cheese to take to Mr. Brown.

=== William the Parachutist ===
William and the outlaws see Home Guard men, one of them a local blacksmith, doing their job practising "shooting through holes" and so forth, and wish they could do something similar. The outlaws build a fortress, made of sandbags and boxes, even equipped with 'little holes' to shoot their toy weapons through. One night, a man in a "woman's dress" whom they think is a parachutist walks along the road they blockaded. The outlaws shoot at him and accidentally knock him out when the barricade falls over. They find a pass to Marleigh Aerodrome on him, so get someone to run to the police. When the policeman is there, the "parachutist" explains he is dressed as a woman because he is in a play that night, he forgives William and lets him see the play at Marleigh Aerodrome. William and the outlaws have the happiest day they have had in their lives so far.

=== William the Salvage Collector ===
William hears at an air raid shelter that scrap iron should be collected more, as a local woman and her daughter have joined them this evening. After the "all clear signal", William goes to bed and dreams of Hitler in a woman's suit pushing a barrow with Ethel – Ethel having a cork in her mouth. When he wakes up, he decides he must do something about collecting scrap iron. The outlaws put letters into people's mailboxes, asking for "skrappion" and the results are varied. Some are amused, and some annoyed, saying they can't "play games" with them. After William finds some scrap iron he carries his cart to the next house. And what a surprise he gets there. He finds the Bevertons exhibition of war memorabilia, even though he thinks it is simply scrap iron. And he has every right to be pleased at what he finds... who wouldn't like to look for junk only to find parts of Dorniers!!! However, the Bevertons, when they find out, are not nearly as impressed. And the fact that William leaves his old junk on the exhibition table, leading to the guests believing it to be a plot to gain cash revenues, does not lessen the spirit of anger.

=== William Helps The Spitfire Fund ===
William, his consciousness nagging him about ruining the Bevertons Spitfire fundraising exhibition decides to raise funds himself by having a war memorabilia exhibition museum himself. The only item he manages to find is a sign a practical joker must have put on the ground saying "unexploded bomb". His museum had no visitors, so it failed. Meanwhile, after hours of nagging Mrs. Bott to give her land up for allotments to a "good cause", The Dig For Victory committee leaves angrily as she brandishes herself about in the air of one who is utterly annoyed. When she sees the signpost saying "unexploded bomb" in front of her mansion, she runs to the Brown's for cover. William and the Outlaws had had to leave it there after their arms would just not lift again, and so left it there they did. "Botty"s wife signs the paper saying she will give up allotments saying it was a sign she must do it. When William takes it away and the Browns don't see it, she says it was a vision telling her to sell her land. She gives William three pounds for the Spitfire Fund in hope that she will receive further good luck accounts.

=== William Gets A Move On ===
William, inspired to do something good for the war cause, sees two men pulling up road signs, and tells them it would be better to turn them the other way, so Germans would get lost. This gives him an idea, when he sees two houses, with identical nameplates with different names attached, and he gets his screwdriver and fixes the plate 'laurel bank' on the house 'heather bank' and vice versa. When he gets home, Robert asks him if he passed Laurel bank, as he admires a blonde young girl named Dulcie who lives there. When the owners of the two houses who once were good friends, but separated after a dispute when one said gardens should be reserved for vegetables and one said the same, but for flowers to keep up the country pride, they send for gardeners to burn all the flowers in the vegetable grower's yard, and all the vegetables in the flower growers yard. But when there (Colonel Peabody and Mr. Bagshott) gardeners find the name plates on the wrong houses, they dig up each growers pride and joy. Each owner, when seeing Robert doing the digging, after suggesting he do the rest to a tired gardener, (after all, when Dulcie saw his rippling muscles working away...) blames first Robert, then the other for the gardener's digging. They end up making up to each other, and Robert and Dulcie meet for the first time. When Robert finds out of William's doings he doesn't mind.

=== Claude Finds a Companion ===
When the outlaws hear from William that sweet production has stopped during the remainder of the war, they decide to make their own sweets and sell them to the shops and eat them themselves. Each boy races through their mother's larder and bring back an odd array. Included are a tin of sardines and a some coconut pieces. They mix it all together to create "sardine toffee" and taste it, with the following results. First tastiness, second a lasting flavour, third a green countenance! One by one they leave until only William and Ginger remain. When William casually mentions the cakes and sweets they would receive at the party they were attending that evening, Ginger goes too. But, William, never one to say 'I surrender' in any case of the like, goes bravely, yet worriedly, to the party. At Mrs Bott's place, where the party will be held, a woman has come to seek one of the children who appears most earnest, to take home to be a companion to her son, Claude. Claude, it turns out, is a bully, even larger than William, and by his mother's standards after all, (she is writing books on child psychology) he should play with a meeker child, so the meeker one would become braver and more manly, and the manly one (meaning Claude) would become more meek. If she had known William's usual look when he hadn't eaten a sweet made of sardines, she may not have been so inclined to take him. But, she didn't. So, she took him. And, when Claude expects another babyish child to pummel at his own will (the father and gardener and housemaid were told not to interfere with proceedings, so not to disturb the balance as Claude's mother said, so unfortunately they watched a poor child being left to the manly strength of Claude) found that William was not his regular punch bag, but a more manly person. When Mrs Brown expects William to come home changed, she gets a full surprise. William, not only unchanged but invigorated, walks in!
