= Just William's Luck =

1948 book by Richmal Crompton

- First edition
- Author: Richmal Crompton
- Illustrator: Thomas Henry
- Language: English
- Genre: Children's literature
- Publisher: George Newnes
- Publication date: 1948
- Publication place: United Kingdom
- Media type: Print (Hardback & Paperback) & Audio book
- Followed by: William the Bold

Just William's Luck (1948) was a novel in the Just William series by Richmal Crompton. The story revolves around the attempts of William Brown and the other Outlaws to get their older brothers married, in order to appropriate wedding presents that they plan to exchange for things of their own desire. After a series of unlikely adventures, the boys serendipitously foil a gang of fur coat smugglers, and receive a reward from the police.

The story came to life after the release of feature film of the same name, loosely based on the books. Crompton was so impressed with the film that she chose to turn it into the only full-length novel in the canon.

== Plot ==
The Brown family are exasperated by William, and Emily the maid is tired of being ordered about. Meanwhile, William is in the old barn with Henry and Douglas, in a make-believe game of 'The Knights of the Round Table', when Ginger arrives on a fabulous bicycle.

== Stage Adaptation ==
Shedload Theatre produced a stage adaptation of Just William's Luck that debuted in 2017 at The Edinburgh Festival Fringe in The Iron Belly Underbelly, Cowgate. Written by Matthew Barnes and Jonathan Massey, it saw William, The Outlaws and Violet Elizabeth enact the story themselves as a play within a play; using childlike takes on physical theatre, puppetry and music. The original cast consisted of Jonathan Massey as William, Thomas Guttridge as Ginger, Davey Lias as Douglas, Greg Arundell as Henry and Lucy Telfer as Violet Elizabeth (Later played by Louise Waller) The production was well received by critics and audiences alike who praised its imagination and energy; with many citing it captured the enthusiastic essence of the source material. Just William's Luck subsequently toured theatres around Europe and Britain and returned again to Underbelly, Edinburgh in 2018.

== Bibliography ==
- Collins, Fiona & Ridgman, Jeremy. Turning the Page: Children's Literature in Performance and the Media. Peter Lang, 2006.
