= William (book) =

1929 book by Richmal Crompton

First edition (publ. Newnes)

William is the 10th in the series of Richmal Crompton's books about the eleven year old William Brown and his three compatriots, together known as the Outlaws. First published in 1929, the book is a collection of short stories featuring young William Brown and his unfailing belief in his own ingenuity and righteousness,

== Stories ==
=== The Mystery of Oaklands ===
Heavily influenced by a series of mystery crime novellas, William and the Outlaws become convinced that a resident has murdered his neighbor, Old Scraggy, as a prelude to theft and buried him by the rose bush in his front garden.

William impersonates the "deceased" Old Scraggy to disturb the murderer to the point where he confesses his crimes as in the "Mystery of the One Eyed-Man". The Outlaws break into Old Scraggy's house but are discovered by the returning occupant who has, in fact, only been away on holiday and are locked in an upstairs room. Such is the exaggeration of Old Scraggy's description of the burglars and would-be assailants that the local policeman is only amused to discover 4 local "nippers" who might have been involved in acts of trespass on a local farmer's land. Old Scraggy is too embarrassed to pursue a prosecution, and the policeman even declines to "box their ears".

=== The New Game ===
After William overhears his older brother and others discussing greyhound racing he, without much opposition, persuades the Outlaws to join him in organizing a greyhound race starring his own mongrel dog Jumble and another. After conceding that charging entry to the event will not work, they decide that the way to easily profit from the enterprise is to run a book and to charge for refreshments. The only asset available to Outlaws is that of their own labor, which they sell to obtain the funding for the comestibles that have to be purchased retail.

On the day of the race, the boys steal a dog chained outside a neighbor's house and attempt to induce it to race Jumble in pursuit of a clockwork mouse. The event is something of a fiasco, and the comestibles are stolen by a rival gang, the Hubert Laneites, while William and the Outlaws attempt to retrieve the now runaway dogs. The experience of trying to run a book is not a happy one for Douglas, and he ends up taking to his heels pursued by angry punters.

In retribution, William's father demands further unpaid labor, sawing logs, but William's ingenuity knows no bounds, and he can score a psychological victory over Hubert Lane and his gang.

=== William's Double Life ===
While the other Outlaws are away on holiday, William occupies himself by trespassing in the gardens of a property called The Laburnams. Each day for a week, William steals substantial quantities of fruit from the Laburnams' orchard and a total of some 200 fish from the pond. After being caught in the act by Miss Murgatroyd, William fakes being his own better socially adapted brother, Algernon. For several days, William's alter ego, Algernon, can dissuade Miss Murgatroid from reporting his felony to his father. When Miss Murgatroyd does finally visit his home to expose his crimes, such is the identity confusion that William's parents believe that she is deranged.

William's pleasure in his amoral activities and the successful theft of 200 fish is sufficient that he faces the unspecified denouement with complete insouciance.

=== William and the Waxwork Prince ===
When William is "kept in" at school by the headmaster, Old Markie, on the day of the local fair, the Outlaws steal a waxwork figure from one of the tents, which is substituted for William. William, carried away by their success, then attempts to impersonate a waxwork at the fair. The attempt appears to go badly. Ultimately, the stolen waxwork is returned undamaged, and the waxwork proprietor puts profit before principle.

The headmaster's use of corporal punishment is accepted unquestionably by William, but the author demonstrates a finer love of natural justice by paying back Old Markie with "one of the worst attacks of arthritis in his right arm (that) he'd had for a long time".

=== William the Showman ===
William and the Outlaws decide to put on their own waxwork show. In the course of the preparations for the show, the Outlaws demonstrate the poverty of their education. The first show ends in a fight between the Outlaw's "waxworks" and a rival local gang, the Hubert Laneites. A second attempt leads William to break into the grounds of The Hall to steal flowers. Here he bumps into Rosemary Verney, who is about to be interviewed against her will for a society magazine. The two switch places. The bogus waxwork show is a huge success, but the interview is not. Rosemary is sent away to boarding school, an outcome for which she is extremely grateful, as she has no wish to continue to live with her self-obsessed mother.

=== The Outlaws Deliver the Goods ===
William and the Outlaws demonstrate an admirable disdain for the accumulation of wealth but are completely subservient to the need for social status gained by charitable giving. In passing, the Outlaws demonstrate great prescience in advance of the contemporary attitude toward education, which is that it should be pursued solely for pecuniary advantage. While trying to raise charitable funds, with the objective of protecting their social status, the Outlaws turn once again to the retail opportunity afforded by a refreshment stall. The Outlaws efforts are in vain as they are misled by Hubert Lane and his gang, who steal the Outlaws' stock.

The Hubert Lane plot leads to the Outlaws entering another neighbor's house and being subjected to social snobbery and being mistaken for the recipients of charitable aid themselves.

Fortune ultimately favors the Outlaws when they receive a substantial reward, which they unhesitatingly donate to the school fund to guarantee their social status.

=== Fireworks Strictly Prohibited ===
William and the Outlaws reach new pinnacles of amorality as, faced with a parental ban on the purchase of fireworks, they dupe the sister of a retired Colonel Masters into assisting them in the theft of her brother's fireworks. Although the Outlaws do not get to benefit directly from the theft, they find a transcendent reward in witnessing their parents brought low while hypocritically engaging in a spontaneous party with the fireworks, which they have in turn appropriated from the boys.

=== The Outlaws Fetch the Holly ===
The Outlaws commit wilful trespass, and William is mistaken for a visitor from space by a perhaps senile professor. William tries to avoid the trespass being exposed by conspiring with the professor's illness. Concurrent with these events is the story of the boys' failure to carry through on a commitment to support the local church by collecting decorative holly.

=== The Sentimental Widow ===
It is a story of an adult man's greed and emotional exploitation of a generous woman. William shows an instinctive attachment to a code of honor to repay favors and presence of mind in exposing a cynical Lothario. William is rewarded with a return to the status quo and the consumption of a "cookie boy."

=== William and the Prize Pig ===
In part a tale of the exploitation of animals in which William and the Outlaws feed cinders and sawdust to an overweight pig that is confined and overfed to win prizes at shows. William successfully rides the beast and, in so doing, gives the pig its first experience of freedom and activity.

To avoid retribution by the farmer, the Outlaw's set out to expose him as a former criminal and break into his home to steal a teapot, which, in fairness, they believe they are returning to its previous owner.

While carrying out a second burglary, William disturbs another, more serious burglar and locks him in an upstairs room (providing literary symmetry with the first tale in this collection).

William's emotionally detached father, who doesn't participate in his child's life, other than to exert erratic and ineffectual behavioral correction, feels obliged to honor what he regards as an ill-judged promise to take William to a pantomime in town when he would far rather be playing golf. William has also learned to be emotionally detached from his family and welcomes the event only for the purpose of receiving five shillings from an aunt that they will visit on the same day. He and the Outlaws have a communist philosophy and hold all pocket money in common.
