= William the Pirate =

Book by Richmal Crompton

William The Pirate
- First image (sixth impression)
- Author: Richmal Crompton
- Illustrator: Thomas Henry
- Language: English
- Genre: Children's literature
- Publisher: Newnes
- Publication date: 1932
- Publication place: United Kingdom
- Media type: Print (hardback & paperback) & Audio book
- Followed by: William the Rebel

William the Pirate is the fourteenth book in the Just William series by Richmal Crompton. It was first published in 1932. It contains eleven short stories.

The story Aunt Arabelle in Charge (originally published as "William's Busy Fortnight" in 1931) features the odious "Anthony Martin", who is often cited as a parody of A.A. Milne's Christopher Robin.

Roddy Doyle said that William the Pirate was one of the books he turned to when writing his Booker Prize-winning novel Paddy Clarke Ha Ha Ha.

== Contents ==
- William and the Musician William helps an Italian puppeteer to return to his native land and accidentally supports Mrs Bott's house party.
- William Holds the Stage William is determined to play the part of Hamlet in a school theatrical performance in order to win Dorinda Lane's praise.
- The Outlaws and the Triplets Henry is forced to look after his baby sister and when the Outlaws lose her, things get complicated.
- William and the Eastern Curse To escape the consequences of the "triplets" episode of the previous story, William agrees to go and visit his aunt. There he helps a girl to choose between two suitors, one of whom he likes and the other he doesn't.
- The New Neighbour William takes ingenious revenge on his aggressive next-door neighbour.
- Mrs Bott's Hat Bizarre circumstances force William to pose as a female circus dwarf in order to return a flamboyant hat to Mrs Bott.
- William and the Princess Goldilocks William falls in love with an actress he sees in a stage play. He sets out to find her but she is not all that she seems.
- Their Good Resolution Wishing to make a more exciting kind of New Year's Resolution, the Outlaws decide to start "rescuing" people.
- William's Invention Mrs Bott tries to convince a journalist that her house is haunted and - with William's accidental help - succeeds.
- Aunt Arabelle in Charge With absent-minded Aunt Arabelle in charge, the Outlaws have the run of Ginger's family home. However, this leads to unexpected problems when a child star stays in the village. (This story is notable for featuring "Anthony Martin", a thinly disguised parody of Christopher Robin Milne, son of A.A. Milne.)
- A Little Affair of Rivalry Robert is infatuated with a newly-arrived beauty but he soon finds that he has a rival!
