= Just William (book series) =

Book series by Richmal Crompton

- Author: Richmal Crompton
- Illustrator: Thomas Henry; Henry Ford; Lunt Roberts
- Publisher: George Newnes Ltd
- Published: 1922–1970
- No. of books: 38 (List of books)

The Just William series is a sequence of 38 books written by English author Richmal Crompton. The books chronicle the adventures of the unruly schoolboy William Brown.

The books were published over a period of almost 50 years, between 1922 and 1970. Throughout the series, the protagonist remains at the same 11 years of age, despite each book being set in the era in which it was written. The first book was Just William, and often the entire series is named after this book. Each book, with the exception of the novel Just William's Luck, is a collection of short stories.

The series has spawned various television, film, theatre and radio adaptations. It also has a large fan following, with such groups as the Just William Society.

== Synopsis of the series ==
=== Setting ===
William Brown is a middle-class schoolboy of 11, who lives in a country village in Southern England. A number of guesses have been made about where the stories are set. In Pensions for Boys in Sweet William (1936), it is suggested that the village is about 50 miles from London. It has also been suggested (in Margarey Disher's book Growing Up with Just William) that it is situated somewhere around Bromley, Kent. It has also been suggested that the village is in Oxfordshire near Bicester. A road sign shown in a Thomas Henry illustration from "William Gets A Move On" in "William Does His Bit" reads "London A1", which would place the village north of London.

William is the leader of his band of friends, who call themselves the Outlaws, with his best friend Ginger and his other friends Henry and Douglas. His scruffy mongrel is called Jumble.

A William story often starts when William or the Outlaws set out to do something, such as putting on a play, collecting scrap metal for the war effort or looking after Violet Elizabeth Bott. William always manages to get into trouble with his parents, although he can never quite understand why. His well-meaning efforts often result in unfortunate outcomes.

Sometimes William can be very moral – he is inspired to tell the truth for the duration of Christmas Day in William's Truthful Christmas (Still William, 1925) with unhappy results:

[William has just received a geometry question and a book on church history for Christmas.]

"Did you like the book and instruments that Uncle and I gave you?" said Aunt Emma brightly.
"No," said William gloomily and truthfully. "I'm not int'rested in Church History an' I've got something like those at school. Not that I'd want 'em," he added hastily, "if I hadn't em."
"William!" screamed Mrs. Brown in horror. "How can you be so ungrateful!"

"I'm not ungrateful," explained William wearily. "I'm only being truthful..."

=== Current events ===
The books within this series often reflected current events within the 20th century. William the Conqueror (1926) for example reflects pre-World War I imperialism, while 1930s books like William The Dictator (1938) dealt with Fascism and 1940s books like William and the Evacuees (1940) were set against the backdrop of World War II. Later on, William and the Moon Rocket (1954) and William and the Space Animal (1956) were written during the space race. Despite the changing events, William and other characters do not age.

== Characters ==
- William Brown – The main character in the series, an 11-year-old schoolboy in a village in England. Leader of the Outlaws, William is unique in schoolboy literature – confident, strong-willed, independent-minded with original world-views, a born leader who is keen to be chief in any undertaking of the Outlaws. He cares little for his clothes or appearance, wears a scowl as his best "company manners" and hates small talk. He loves to play Red Indians and pirates, and readily embarks on any project, from catching wartime spies or making a "moon rocket", to editing a "newspaper" or organising a "circus" or "show", often featuring his pet dog Jumble as reluctant star. William usually has a withering contempt for girls and women (except his mother) though there are notable exceptions and he can even be chivalrous on occasion. He has a soft spot for a neighbour, Joan who admires him enormously. A rebel and die-hard optimist, William often shows a strong sense of responsibility when the situation demands, an unwillingness to back out of challenges and a bulldog-like determination to overcome hurdles. His imagination and predilection for adventure constantly get him into difficult situations. William and the outlaws often engage in elaborate schemes to earn money with mixed results. He is frequently inspired to “help” others he deems in need but runs into unforeseen complications in his efforts but as fortune favours the brave, William often comes out on top though is sometimes reprimanded and punished by his parents for his misdeeds. His 'motto' is: Doin' good, rightin' wrongs, spreadin' happiness and walking down the narrow path of virtue.
- Ginger Flowerdew/Merridew – William's best friend and member of the Outlaws. "Ginger" is a nickname derived from the colour of his hair: We never learn his real first name, though his surname is either Flowerdew or Merridew (one of the author's many inconsistencies). He has an elder brother called Hector, who is friends with William's older brother Robert. He is notoriously optimistic. The Just William stories often involve only William and Ginger, leaving out the other Outlaws.
- Henry – One of William's friends and the oldest member of the Outlaws. He is considered well-read and well-informed. He has an elder brother, John, and also an unnamed baby sister, with whom he is perpetually warring. In the earliest stories, he is said to be William's rival for leadership of the Outlaws.
- Douglas – One of William's friends and a member of the Outlaws. He is the most prudent and discreet of the group; unoptimistic and usually the voice of objection when William reveals his 'Plans'. He has an elder brother, George, Robert's friend. In the earlier stories, his catchphrase is "By Jove".
- Jumble – William's scruffy mongrel, a mixture of many breeds.
- Margaret or Mary Brown – William's long-suffering mother. Despite innumerable disappointments, she never loses faith in William, saying often to the other Brown family members when they object of him that, 'He means well'. Mrs Brown's first name is Margaret in William Again, 2, but Mary in Just William's Luck, 17, William – the Explorer, 5, and William's Treasure Trove, 5.
- John Brown – William's sardonic father, often vexed by William's troublesome behaviour, but at times giving subtle hints that he agrees with his son by rewarding him with money. Some of the stories also suggest that Mr Brown was very much like William in his youth, where he was friends with Ginger, Douglas and Henry's fathers. He works in an office, and frequently takes time off due to his 'liver' (i.e., drinking). He is a Conservative, according to William.
- Ethel Brown – William's elder sister, a pretty redhead who is incredibly popular among the local adolescent males in the village, with The most persistent being Jimmy Moore. Ethel is variously aged in the stories between 17 and 21. William himself can never understand why people are attracted to her because she is usually quite mean to him. Ethel does, however, have quite a soft spot for William; she is genuinely distressed when she believes him to be sick, though William is often faking it.
- Robert Brown – William's grown-up brother who is infatuated by a succession of girls, each of whom he swears is "the most beautiful girl in the world" until he moves on to the next. Robert's age (like Ethel's) varies between stories: he is sometimes as young as 17 and sometimes as old as 22 (though in the novel Just William's Luck he confirms his age as 21). He is a hopeless romantic whose world view is coloured by the heroic novels he reads. He is also something of a "social climber", eager to impress his friends and family with his worldly knowledge and important acquaintances. Several of the stories involve Robert attempting to impress a girl, but irritated and embarrassed by William in the process. He is supposedly a Liberal, though William dismisses this as "Just Swank". He is supposedly "at college", probably Oxford or Cambridge, though this is never specified.
- Violet-Elizabeth Bott – The lisping spoiled daughter of the local nouveau riche millionaire, Mr. Bott, who forces the reluctant Outlaws to allow her to join them on their adventures with her effective threat: "I'll thcream and thcream and thcream till I'm thick". She was introduced in the fifth book Still William (1925) in which she featured in three stories. She appeared in one story in the sixth book William the Conqueror (1926), but was not seen again for several years. In most stories her lisp is on the "s" (dogs → dogth) but in some books it changes to the "r" (princess → pwincess).
- Mr. & Mrs. Bott – Introduced early in the series as new inhabitants to the village, Mr. and Mrs. Bott are a nouveau riche millionaire couple who spoil their daughter Violet Elizabeth. Mr. Bott made his millions by patenting and selling "Bott's Digestive Sauce" (allegedly made from squashed beetles). While Mr. Bott is fairly easy-going, his wife is a social climber, eager to impress high-society people with her wealth. Despite being figures of fun, the Botts are often represented sympathetically. Perhaps because of their lower-class origins, they take William and his friends more seriously than do most adults.
- Joan Clive/Crewe/Parfitt – The girl next door. Younger than William, she is his uncritical admirer, whom he will go to some efforts to impress. She is sometimes described a member of the Outlaws, and sometimes an "Outlaw-ally". Joan has three surnames throughout the series; first Clive, then Crewe, then Parfitt, before reverting to Clive. She also changes in physical appearance; Joan Clive has blue eyes and bright golden curls, whereas Joans Crewe and Parfitt have dark eyes, dark curly hair and a dimpled complexion. Crewe turns to Parfitt after Joan's absence then subsequent return to the village after her London home is bombed, so it is possible her mother has been widowed (or, rather unlikely, divorced) and remarried. However, in William Meets the Professor (William and the Tramp) she has inexplicably reverted to Clive. Her birthday is on the same day as Hubert Lane's.
- Hubert Lane – William's chief rival in the village for popularity among boys. He is opposite in character to William, being greedy, underhand, vindictive and spoiled. He is obese and loves to eat. His gang (the "Hubert Laneites") remain loyal to him mostly on account of his excessive pocket money, which he uses to buy cream cakes and other luxuries for his supporters. He almost always comes off worse in confrontations with William. His birthday is on the same day as Joan's.
- Bertie Franks – A leading member of the Hubert Laneites, usually Hubert's lieutenant, though in William the Gangster he sets up as a gang leader in his own right. Like Hubert, he is fat and spoiled.
- Oswald Franks – Bertie Franks's elder brother, friend of Robert's. He is pretty much like Bertie.
- Mrs. Lane – Hubert Lane's mother. She likes to imagine that William and Hubert are best friends, and whenever she is forced to accept that they are not, goes to great extents to end the feud between them. She also spoils and supports Hubert to a ridiculous extent.
- Mr. Marks/Markson – The headmaster of William's school, known to William and his friends as "Ole Markie". He is early middle-aged, and has a sensitive personality which he does his best not to show when he is at work. He gets on well with his older pupils, but dislikes younger and more disruptive ones like William.
- Ole Stinks – William's chemistry teacher. He frequently punishes William for his misbehaviour in the laboratory, but actually rather enjoys his company. ("Stinks" is old fashioned schoolboy slang for chemistry.)
- Mr. French – The most frequently mentioned of William's teachers, he is usually an antagonist.
- Victor Jameson – The leader of another gang of boys. Victor's gang generally supports William's, though they occasionally argue with them. Victor is often involved in fights against the Laneites and in audiences of Outlaw productions.
- Jameson Jameson - Elder brother of Victor Jameson and a contemporary of Robert (though in some stories it is Victor who is the older brother). In the story "The Weak Spot" he founds the "Society of Reformed Bolshevists" which Robert and William both join. William's "junior branch" soon reveals a fatal flaw in socialism which their elders had missed.
- Jimmy Moore – A solid, dependable youth of Ethel's peer group. Her fall back beau when more glamorous suitors let her down. In William and The Badminton Racquet, William helps restore him to Ethel's favour. Jimmy is so impressed that he gives William a new badminton racquet.
- Arabella Simpkin – A strong-willed, witty girl who acts as an antagonist for the Outlaws, generally disrupting their activities by disputing their leadership. She always attends the Outlaws' shows and always demands her money back.
- Archie Mannister – An absent-minded young artist, besotted with Ethel and on more-or-less friendly terms with William. He appears more in the later books. He also loves Eleanor, Colonel Fortescue's niece. Colonel Fortescue is the friend of his father.
- Dorinda Lane – Another of William's love interests. She adores William, and is a big fan of "Funny things", including William's appearance in a production of Hamlet. She is a relative of Hubert's. Her aunt lives in William's village.
- Mr Moss- The owner of the sweet shop in earlier stories, before getting married and presumably leaving his job. A friend of William, and often generous to him, such as letting him take charge of his sweet shop while he proposes to his beloved.

== Publication and illustrations ==
The short stories were first serialised in a magazine called Home (beginning in February 1919), then in one called Happy. Following that, collections of stories were printed as books.

All the William books until William and the Witch published in 1964 were illustrated by Thomas Henry in ink, with water colour illustrations for the front covers. After Henry's death in 1962, Henry Ford and Lunt Roberts (who had previously illustrated her Jimmy books) continued in his style.

== List of books ==
=== Books in the series ===
Crompton continued to write William books right up until her death in 1969, with the last, William the Lawless, being published posthumously in 1970.

The publication dates are for the UK.

Note that although George Newnes continued to issue reprints of the series until the late 1960s, from 1963 Newnes began to abridge their editions, typically omitting between two and four stories. Abridged editions became the standard versions of the books through the reprints by other publishers in the 1960s and 1970s, until the Macmillan reprints of the 1980s and 1990s restored the full texts, with the exception of William the Detective, which excluded the story William and the Nasties, the theme of the Outlaws imitating Nazism and Antisemitism being thought unsuitable for a modern audience.

Editions highlighted in green are complete, while editions highlighted in red are abridged.

Number	Title	George Newnes (HB)	William Collins (HB)	Armada (PB)	Merlin (PB)	Macmillan (PB)
01	Just William	1922	1972	1974	1968	1983
02	More William	1922		1971		1983
03	William Again	1923		1977		1984
04	William The Fourth	1924		1973		1984
05	Still William	1925		1975		1985
06	William the Conqueror	1926		1975	1968	1985
07	William the Outlaw	1927		1973		1986
08	William in Trouble	1927		1971		1986
09	William the Good	1928				1986
10	William	1929			1967	1986
11	William the Bad	1930		1971		1986
12	William's Happy Days	1930		1977		1986
13	William's Crowded Hours	1931		1973		1986
14	William the Pirate	1932		1975		1986
15	William the Rebel	1933		1977	1967	1986
16	William the Gangster	1934		1975	1967	1986
17	William the Detective	1935		1971		1986
18	Sweet William	1936		1973		1986
19	William the Showman	1937				1986
20	William the Dictator	1938				1986
21	William and Air Raid Precautions, also published as William's Bad Resolution	1939	1972	1974		1986
22	William and the Evacuees, also published as William and the Film Star	1940				1986
23	William Does His Bit	1941		1971		1986
24	William Carries On	1942		1973		1986
25	William and the Brains Trust also published by Collins as William the Hero	1945	1972			1986
26	Just William's Luck the only novel in the series	1948	1972	1973		1986
27	William – the Bold	1950		1977		1986
28	William and the Tramp	1952				1986
29	William and the Moon Rocket	1954	1972	1974	1968	1986
30	William and the Space Animal	1956		1971	1967	1986
31	William's Television Show	1958		1975	1968	1986
32	William the Explorer	1960	1972			1986
33	William's Treasure Trove	1962				1986
34	William and the Witch	1964				1986
35	William and the Pop Singers	1965		1975		1986
36	William and the Masked Ranger	1966		1973		1986
37	William the Superman	1968				1986
38	William the Lawless	1970				

=== Play ===
Crompton wrote a one-act play featuring the character:

- William and the Artist's Model (J. Garnett Miller, London, 1956).

==== Plays by writers other than Crompton ====
- Alick Hayes, Just William: A Play in Three Acts, Based on the Character "William" Created by Richmal Crompton (Macdonald and Young, London, 1947).
- _________, More Just William (Macdonald and Young, London, 1947).
- Ireland Wood, William's Half Holiday: A Play in One Act, from a Story by Richmal Crompton (Macdonald and Young, London, 1960).
- Matthew Barnes, Jonathan Massey Just William's Luck (Unpublished, 2018).

=== Radio play scripts ===
Crompton wrote 55 play scripts for the BBC, broadcast from 1946. These were first collected for publication in 6 volumes from 2008 to 10, including several unbroadcast scripts. Nearly half of the plays were original stories, not derived from the books:

1. William - the Terrible (David Schutte, West Sussex, 2008).
2. William - the Lionheart (David Schutte, West Sussex, 2008).
3. William - the Peacemaker (David Schutte, West Sussex, 2009).
4. William - the Avenger (David Schutte, West Sussex, 2009).
5. William - the Smuggler (David Schutte, West Sussex, 2010).
6. William's Secret Society (David Schutte, West Sussex, 2010).

=== Film tie-ins ===
Though credited to Crompton, this was merely authorised by her, but not written by her. It presented the script of the first William film:

- Just William: The Book of the Film (George Newnes, London, 1940).

A further tie-in was published for the second film, without any involvement from Crompton:

- Just William's Luck: The Story of the Film in the Making (D. McKenzie, London, 1947).

=== Further compilations ===
These are out of the 'regular' series, and entirely feature stories already published across the main series of books.

- William - the Ancient Briton (Armada, London, 1965).
- William - the Globetrotter (Armada, London, 1965).
- William the Cannibal (Armada, London, 1965).
- William and the Monster (Armada, London, 1965).
- Just William and Other Stories (BCA, London, 1977).
- The Just William Collection (W. H. Smith's, London, 1991).
- Just William - As Seen on TV (Macmillan, London, 1994) - TV tie-in to the first series of the 1990s TV series.
- More Just William - As Seen on TV (Macmillan, London, 1995) - TV tie-in to the second series of the 1990s TV series.
- William at War (Macmillan, London, 1995).
- Just William at Christmas (Macmillan, London, 1995).
- Just William on Holiday (Macmillan, London, 1996).
- Just William at School (Macmillan, London, 1997).
- Just William - and Other Animals (Macmillan, London, 1998).
- Just William and Girls (Macmillan, London, 2000).

=== Books about the series ===
- Mary Cadogan, Richmal Crompton: The Woman Behind William (Allen & Unwin, London, 1986).
- ____________, The William Companion (Macmillan, London, 1990).
- ____________, Just William Through the Ages (Macmillan, London, 1995).
- Gillian Clements and Kenneth Waller, Just William's World: A Pictorial Map (Macmillan, London, 1990).
- Margaret Disher, Growing Up With Just William (Outlaws Publishing Company, London, 1990).
- W. O. G. Lofts and Derek Adley, William: A Bibliography (Privately published, Middlesex, 1980).

=== Assorted tie-ins ===
- Just William's Cookin' Book (Armada, London, 1977).
- Just William Annual 1978 (World Distributors, London, 1977) - tie-in to the 1970s TV series.
- Just William Annual 1979 (World Distributors, London, 1978) - tie-in to the 1970s TV series.
- The William Diary 1995 (Macmillan, London, 1994).
- The William Diary 1996 (Macmillan, London, 1995).
- Just William's Codes: An Outlaws Club Book (Macmillan, London, 1994).
- Just William's Plays: An Outlaws Club Book (Macmillan, London, 1994).
- Just William's Puzzles: An Outlaws Club Book (Macmillan, London, 1994).
- Just William's Tricks: An Outlaws Club Book (Macmillan, London, 1994).
- Just William Bumper Joke and Activity Book (Macmillan, London, 1995) - tie-in to the 1990s TV series.

== Media adaptations ==
=== Films ===
Several films were made based on the books. The first of these is Just William (1940), directed by Graham Cutts and written by Doreen Montgomery and Ireland Wood. It starred Richard Lupino as William Brown and featured Fred Emney as Mr. Brown, Basil Radford as Mr. Sidway, Amy Veness as Mrs. Bott, Iris Hoey as Mrs. Brown, Roddy McDowall as Ginger, Norman Robinson as Douglas, Peter Miles as Henry, David Tree as Marmaduke Bott, Jenny Laird as Ethel Brown and Simon Lack as Robert Brown.

Just William's Luck and William at the Circus were both released in 1948 and were written and directed by Val Guest. They starred William Graham as William Brown and featured Garry Marsh as Mr. Brown, Jane Welsh as Mrs. Brown, Hugh Cross as Robert Brown, Kathleen Stuart as Ethel Brown, Brian Roper as Ginger, Brian Weske as Henry and James Crabbe as Douglas.

=== Radio ===
Alick Hayes, the BBC radio producer of The Will Hay Programme, decided to put together a cast for the first Just William radio series, which ran for two years on the BBC Light Programme (as a sitcom), beginning in 1946. He found his William in John Clark, the young actor who had played D'arcy Minor, and Charles Hawtrey, also from the Will Hay Programme, became Hubert Lane. Gordon McLeod was Mr. Brown, Betty Bowden Mrs. Brown, Harry Locke (later, Michael Allinson) played Robert and Ethel was Rosamund Barnes. Violet Elizabeth was played by Jacqueline Boyer, who replaced the original, and Ginger by Tony Stockman.

Later, for radio, there was a play, William and the Artist's Model, written in 1956.

The BBC has produced many recordings of William stories read by Martin Jarvis, originally broadcast on BBC Radio 4. See Just William (BBC Radio series).

Kenneth Williams read eight stories for Argo in the early 1980s.

=== Theatre ===
As was often the case with popular radio shows, there was a big push to put it on the stage, where audiences could get to actually put a face to the famous voices, and the actors could get to earn decent money after the frugal amounts offered by the BBC – William was paid 4 guineas a show, which was standard pay for juveniles at the time (regardless of the size of their part in the show). And so it was that the 1947 radio series of Just William found a new life in a stage production, written by Alick Hayes and Richmal Crompton, produced by Violet Elizabeth's father Jack Boyer, opening in Birmingham, and for the next 2 years toured the British Isles on the Moss Empire music hall circuit, busting house records at most theatres it played due to the thousands of children who got their first taste of theatre from the gallery. The closest it got to the West End was the Granville, Walham Green, owned by Jack Boyer, where it became one of the first plays to be televised by the BBC. John Clark, under contract, had to stick it out to the end, even though his voice had begun to break.

Shedload Theatre produced a stage adaptation of Just William's Luck that debuted in 2017 at The Edinburgh Festival Fringe in Underbelly, Cowgate. Written by Richmal Crompton's great-nephew, it saw William, The Outlaws and Violet Elizabeth enact the story themselves as a play within a play; using childlike takes on physical theatre, puppetry and music. The production was well received by critics and audiences alike who praised its imagination and energy; with many citing that it captured the enthusiastic essence of the source material. Just William's Luck subsequently toured theatres around Europe and Britain and returned again to Underbelly, Edinburgh in 2018.

A stage musical by composer/lyricist Nick Hutson and comedy writer Ed Rowett is in development with the support of the Richmal Crompton family.

=== Television ===
==== TV Movie ====
In 1946 the BBC made a film based on their radio series, with the original cast, including John Clark as William, recreating their roles.

==== 1950s series ====
In 1956 ITV aired a series based on the books called Over to William. The series ran for 13 episodes and starred Keith Crane as William.

==== 1960s series ====
In 1962 and 1963 a BBC TV series called William was broadcast. The 1962 series starred Dennis Waterman as William. In 1963 he was replaced by Denis Gilmore. It also featured Howard Lever as Robert, Christopher Witty as Ginger, Kaplan Kaye as Henry, Carlo Cura as Douglas and Gillian Gostling as Violet Elizabeth.

===== Episodes =====
Series one

- William and the Wonderful Present (26 May 1962)
- William and the Leopard Hunter (2 June 1962)
- William Finds a Job (9 June 1962)
- William the Counterspy (16 June 1962)
- William and the Parrots (23 June 1962)
- William and the American Tie (30 June 1962)

Series two

- William the Peacemaker (30 March 1963)
- William and the Little Girl (6 April 1963)
- William and the Three Bears (13 April 1963)
- William and the Sleeping Major (20 April 1963)
- William and the Real Laurence (27 April 1963)
- William goes Shopping (4 May 1963)

==== 1970s series ====
Running for two series broadcast in 1976 and 1977, an ITV series called Just William was made by London Weekend Television. It features Adrian Dannatt as William, with Stephen Wilmot as Henry, Diana Fairfax as Mrs. Brown, Hugh Cross as Mr. Brown, Stacy Dorning as Ethel Brown, Bonnie Langford as Violet Elizabeth Bott, Simon Chandler as Robert Brown and Diana Dors as Mrs. Bott.

===== Episodes =====
Information from here

Series one

- William and the Begging Letter (Episode: #1.1–6 February 1977)
- William the Great Actor (Episode: #1.2–13 February 1977)
- The Outlaws and the Tramp (Episode: #1.3–20 February 1977)
- The Sweetest Little Girl in White (Episode: #1.4–27 February 1977)
- William and the Badminton Racket (Episode: #1.5–6 March 1977)
- A Little Interlude (Episode: #1.6–13 March 1977)
- William and the Prize Pig (Episode: #1.7–20 March 1977)
- William and the Wonderful Present (Episode: #1.8–27 March 1977)
- William the Matchmaker (Episode: #1.9–3 April 1977)
- Waste Paper Wanted (Episode: #1.10–10 April 1977)
- Only Just in Time (Episode: #1.11–17 April 1977)
- William and the Sleeping Major (Episode: #1.12–24 April 1977)
- William Clears the Slums (Episode: #1.13–1 May 1977)

Series two

- William's Lucky Day (Episode: #2.1–23 October 1977)
- The Great Detective (Episode: #2.2–30 October 1977)
- Violet Elizabeth Wins (Episode: #2.3–6 November 1977)
- William Holds the Stage (Episode: #2.4–13 November 1977)
- William the Philanthropist (Episode: #2.5–20 November 1977)
- It All Began with the Typewriter (Episode: #2.6–27 November 1977)
- A Rescue Party (Episode: #2.7–4 December 1977)
- William Finds a Job (Episode: #2.8–11 December 1977)
- Parrots for Ethel (Episode: #2.9–18 December 1977)
- William at the Garden Party (Episode: #2.10–1 January 1978)
- Two Good Turns (Episode: #2.11–8 January 1978)
- Finding a School for William Episode: #2.12–15 January 1978)
- William and the Tramp (Episode: #2.13–22 January 1978)

Christmas Special:

- William's Worst Christmas (24 December 1977)

==== 1990s series ====
In 1994, the BBC broadcast another series also called Just William. Written by Allan Baker and directed by David Giles, it starred Oliver Rokison as William, Tiffany Griffiths as Violet Elizabeth Bott and featured Jonathan Hirst as Ginger, Alastair Weller (credited as Alistair Weller) as Douglas, Polly Adams as Mrs. Brown, David Horovitch as Mr. Brown, Ben Pullen as Robert Brown, Naomi Allisstone as Ellen the maid, and Olivia Hallinan as Susie Chambers.

===== Episodes =====
Series one

- William and the White Elephants (13 November 1994)
- Finding a School for William (20 November 1994)
- William and the Great Actor (27 November 1994)
- William's Birthday (4 December 1994)
- William and the Russian Prince (11 December 1994)
- William's Busy Day (18 December 1994)

Series two

- William Clears the Slums (12 November 1995)
- Boys Will Be Boys (19 November 1995)
- William and the Ebony Hairbrush (26 November 1995)
- William and the Old Man in the Fog (3 December 1995)
- Parrots for Ethel (10 December 1995)
- William Turns Over a New Leaf (17 December 1995)

==== 2010s series ====
In July, 2009, it was announced that the BBC were working on a new series of Just William. The episodes were written by Men Behaving Badly writer Simon Nye and broadcast in 2010 starring Daniel Roche (Ben in Outnumbered) who plays William and newcomer Robert A Foster who plays Henry. The series was narrated by Martin Jarvis.

===== Episodes =====
Series one

- The Sweet Little Girl in White (28 December 2010)
- Parrots for Ethel (29 December 2010)
- The School Report (30 December 2010)
- William Holds the Stage (31 December 2010)

=== Comics ===
A Just William comic strip appeared in Look-in magazine from April to October 1977, adapted by Angus Allan and drawn by Arthur Ranson, to tie into the ITV series being broadcast at that time.

== Controversy ==
William has been criticised by the RSPCA for stories where he is cruel to animals. For example, in one story, William's friend Henry paints his dog blue as a circus exhibit. In a different story, William and another dog owner have a competition to see which dog can kill the most rats in a certain time.

One story has been removed from modern editions of the books. The story is "William and the Nasties" from William The Detective, in which William suspects a Jewish shop owner of dishonesty and forms a mob to evict him. ("Nasty" was William's mispronunciation of Nazi.) This story was written in 1935, two years after Adolf Hitler seized power but four years before the start of the Second World War. The atrocities committed in The Holocaust were not as well known (and indeed had mostly not yet happened) as they are in modern times, and the story was probably meant as parody. At the end of the story William and the Outlaws help capture a thief who had imprisoned the shopkeeper, and the shopkeeper generously gives them sweets as a reward.

This story appeared in all the 20 impressions of William the Detective published by George Newnes (1935–1967), and in all the editions brought out by Armada in the 1970s. It was in 1986, in the edition brought out by Macmillan Children's Books, that this story was first omitted. Richmal Crompton's biographer, Mary Cadogan, wrote that both Richmal Crompton's literary executor – her niece Richmal Ashbee – and her publisher Macmillan "unhesitatingly decided to drop this episode ["William and the Nasties"] completely from new editions of the book."

== In popular culture ==
- The novel Good Omens (1990) by Neil Gaiman and Terry Pratchett began life as a short story called William the Antichrist, a parody of the William books. The William books were directly referenced in the TV miniseries based on the novel (2019).
- referenced in Cosmo Pyke's song "Great Dane" in 2017.
- referenced in Guy Mankowski's book, Albion's Secret History: Snapshots of England's Pop Rebels and Outsiders in a chapter entitled "Ginger Beer in Teacups, and Leaves on the Lawn – Oscar Wilde, Just William, Sherlock Holmes and The Age of Innocence".
- The book series was a favourite of John Lennon's as a child, along with Alice in Wonderland. Several biographers have suggested that he patterned his group of mischievous school friends after the Outlaws.

== See also ==
- Penrod series by Booth Tarkington
