= Richmal Crompton =

English short-story writer and novelist (1890–1969)

- Richmal Crompton Lamburn, pictured on the cover of her biography
- Born: Richmal Crompton Lamburn; 15 November 1890; Bury, Lancashire, England
- Died: 11 January 1969 (aged 78); Locksbottom, London, England
- Occupations: Teacher, novelist, short story writer
- Writing career
- Pen name: Richmal Crompton
- Period: 1919 to 1969
- Genres: Children's literature, novels, short stories inspiring
- Notable work: Just William

Signature
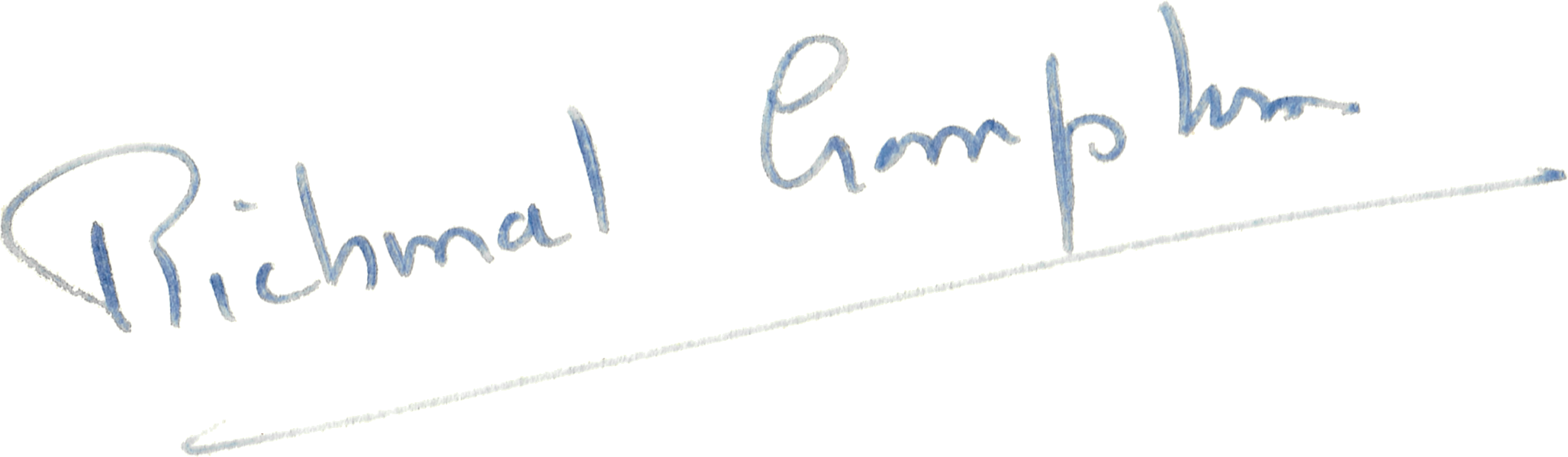

Richmal Crompton Lamburn (15 November 1890 – 11 January 1969) was a popular English writer, best known for her Just William series of books, humorous short stories, and to a lesser extent adult fiction books.

== Life ==
Richmal Crompton Lamburn was born in Bury, the second child of the Rev. Edward John Sewell Lamburn, a Classics master at Bury Grammar School and his wife Clara (née Crompton) Her brother, John Battersby Crompton Lamburn, also became a writer and is remembered under the name John Lambourne for his fantasy novel The Kingdom That Was (1931), and as a successful writer on natural science as John Crompton. Richmal also had a sister, Gwen, who was 18 months older, and a younger sister, Phyllis, who died of whooping cough at age 14 months.

Richmal Crompton attended St Elphin's Boarding School for the daughters of the clergy, originally based in Warrington, Lancashire, where Gwen also was in attendance. Richmal later moved with the school to a new location in Darley Dale, near Matlock, Derbyshire in 1904. In order to further her chosen career as a schoolteacher, she won a scholarship to Royal Holloway College, part of the University of London in Englefield Green, Surrey. Crompton was elected Senior Scholar for the first year students, was secretary of the Classics Club, and treasurer of the Christian Union. She graduated in 1914 with a BA honours degree in Classics (II class). Crompton took part in the Women's Suffrage movement.

In 1914, she returned to St Elphin's as a Classics mistress and later, at age 27, moved to Bromley High School in southeast London where she began her writing in earnest. Her biographer Mary Cadogan writes that she was an excellent and committed teacher at both schools. Having contracted poliomyelitis in 1923 she was left without the use of her right leg. She gave up her teaching career and began to write full-time. Crompton never married and had no children, but she greatly enjoyed being an aunt and a great-aunt. Crompton's first published story appeared in 1919, and the first of her quickly-popular "William" stories was published in Home magazine in February, 1919. Her William stories and her other literature were extremely successful, and three years after she retired from teaching, Crompton was able to afford to have a house (The Glebe) built in Bromley Common for herself and her mother, Clara.

Crompton died in 1969 at the age of 78, after a heart attack, in Farnborough Hospital. She left the copyright of all her books to her niece, Mrs Richmal C. L. Ashbee of Chelsfield, Kent; along with £57,623.

== Work ==
Crompton's best known books are the William stories, about a mischievous 11-year-old schoolboy and his band of friends, known as "The Outlaws". Her first published short story featuring William was "Rice Mould Pudding", published in Home magazine in 1919. She had written "The Outlaws" in 1917, but it was not published until March 1919. In 1922, the first collection, entitled Just-William, was published. She wrote 38 other William books throughout her life. The last, William the Lawless, was published posthumously in 1970. Another, Just William: The Book of the Film, consists of the script of the 1938 film as well as six of the stories on which it was based.

The William books sold over 12 million copies in the United Kingdom alone and they remain in print. They have been adapted for films, stage-plays, and numerous radio and television series. Illustrations by Thomas Henry contributed to their success. In 1934 Crompton wrote a controversial William story called "William and the Nasties," (published in the 1945 book William the Detective) which seems to contain both antisemitism and a recognition of antisemitism's dangers. The story was omitted from editions of the book after 1986.

Crompton saw her real work as writing adult fiction. Starting with The Innermost Room (1923), she wrote 41 novels for adults and published nine collections of short stories. Their focus was generally village life in the Home Counties Though these novels have the same inventiveness and lack of sentimentality as the 'William' books, after the Second World War such literature had an increasingly limited appeal.

Even William was originally created for a grown-up audience, as she saw Just William as a potboiler. She was pleased by its success, but seemed frustrated that her other novels and short stories did not receive the same recognition. Her first published story was published in The Girl's Own Paper in 1918, concerning a little boy named Thomas, a forerunner of William who reacts against authority. Crompton tried several times to reformulate William for other audiences. Jimmy (1949) was aimed at younger children, and Enter – Patricia (1927) at girls. Crompton wrote two more Jimmy books, but no more Patricia, and neither was as successful as William.

Crompton never disclosed the source of inspiration for the main character William; different opinions exist. According to the actor John Teed, whose family lived next door to Crompton, the model for William was Crompton's nephew Tommy:

As a boy I knew Miss Richmal Crompton Lamburn well. She lived quietly with her mother in Cherry Orchard Road, Bromley Common. My family lived next door. In those days it was a small rural village. Miss Lamburn was a delightful unassuming young woman and I used to play with her young nephew Tommy. He used to get up to all sorts of tricks and he was always presumed to be the inspiration for William by all of us. Having contracted polio she was severely crippled and confined to a wheelchair. Owing to her restricted movements she took her setting from her immediate surroundings which contained many of the features described, such as unspoilt woods and wide streams and Biggin Hill Aerodrome, very active in the Twenties.

However, the adventures of Richmal's brother John (Jack) also are said to have provided the inspiration for some of William's activities, and Tommy's younger sister has insisted that William and other of Crompton's characters are more a result of the latter's fertile imagination than they are sketches of real persons.

It has been said that Crompton's fiction "is based on serious themes, albeit that her genre of choice is often comedy" and that in it "pomposity and selfishness must be exposed and each of us should listen to our guiding spirit." The William books have been translated into over twenty languages.

== List of published works ==
The publication dates are for the UK.

=== Just William short story collections ===
- Just William, 1922
- More William, 1922
- William Again, 1923
- William the Fourth, 1924
- Still William, 1925
- William the Conqueror, 1926
- William the Outlaw, 1927
- William in Trouble, 1927
- William the Good, 1928
- William, 1929
- William the Bad, 1930
- William's Happy Days, 1930
- William's Crowded Hours, 1931
- William the Pirate, 1932
- William the Rebel, 1933
- William the Gangster, 1934
- William the Detective, 1935
- Sweet William, 1936
- William the Showman, 1937
- William the Dictator, 1938
- William and A.R.P., 1939 (also published as William's Bad Resolution, 1956)
- William and the Evacuees, 1940 (also published as William and the Film Star, 1956)
- William Does His Bit, 1941
- William Carries On, 1942
- William and The Brains Trust, 1945
- Just William's Luck, 1948
- William the Bold, 1950
- William and the Tramp, 1952
- William and the Moon Rocket, 1954
- William and the Artist's Model, 1956
- William and the Space Animal, 1956
- William's Television Show, 1958
- William the Explorer, 1960
- William's Treasure Trove, 1962
- William and the Witch, 1964
- William and the Pop Singers, 1965
- William and the Masked Ranger, 1966
- William the Superman, 1968
- William the Lawless, 1970

=== Just William plays ===
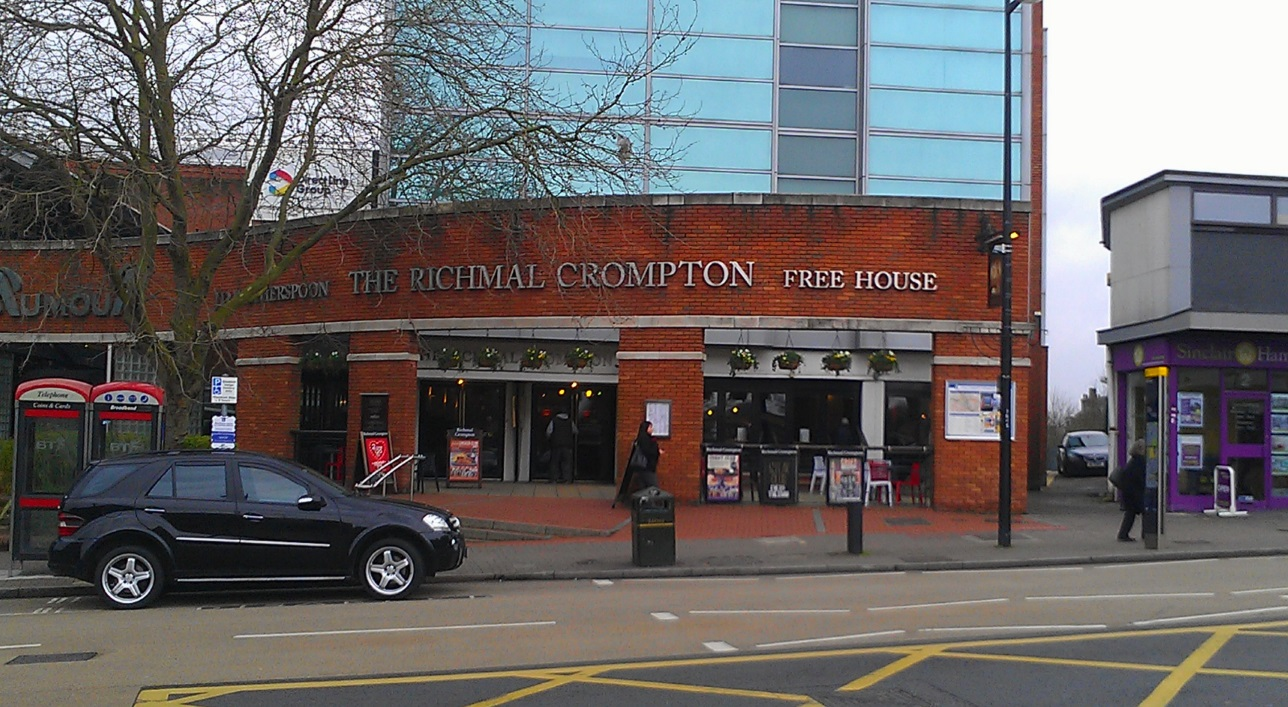
"The Richmal Crompton", a Wetherspoons pub in Bromley named after the local author

- William and the Artist's Model, 1956
- William the Terrible, BBC Radio Plays volume 1, 2008, published by David Schutte
- William the Lionheart, BBC Radio Plays volume 2, 2008, published by David Schutte
- William the Peacemaker, BBC Radio Plays volume 3, 2009, published by David Schutte
- William the Avenger, BBC Radio Plays volume 4, 2009, published by David Schutte
- William the Smuggler, BBC Radio Plays volume 5, 2010, published by David Schutte
- William's Secret Society, BBC Radio Plays volume 6, 2010, published by David Schutte

=== Miscellaneous books for children ===
- Enter – Patricia, 1927
- Jimmy, 1949
- Jimmy Again, 1951
- Jimmy the Third, a compilation of stories from Jimmy and Jimmy Again, 1965

=== Others ===
- The Innermost Room, 1923
- The Hidden Light, 1924
- Anne Morrison, 1925
- The Wildings, 1925
- David Wilding, 1926
- The House, 1926 (also published as Dread Dwelling)
- Kathleen and I, and, of Course, Veronica, 1926 (short stories)
- Millicent Dorrington, 1927
- A Monstrous Regiment, 1927 (short stories)
- Leadon Hill, 1927
- The Thorn Bush, 1928
- Roofs Off!, 1928
- The Middle Things, 1928 (short stories)
- Felicity Stands By, 1928 (short stories)
- Sugar and Spice and Other Stories, 1928 (short stories)
- Mist and Other Stories, 1928 (short stories), republished in May 2015 by Sundial Press as "MIST And Other Ghost Stories"
- The Four Graces, 1929
- Abbot's End, 1929
- Ladies First, 1929 (short stories)
- Blue Flames, 1930
- Naomi Godstone, 1930
- The Silver Birch and Other Stories, 1931 (short stories)
- Portrait of a Family, 1931
- The Odyssey of Euphemia Tracy, 1932
- Marriage of Hermione, 1932
- The Holiday, 1933
- Chedsy Place, 1934
- The Old Man's Birthday, 1934
- Quartet, 1935
- Caroline, 1936
- The First Morning, 1936 (short stories)
- There Are Four Seasons, 1937
- Journeying Wave, 1938
- Merlin Bay, 1939
- Steffan Green, 1940
- Narcissa, 1941
- Mrs Frensham Describes a Circle, 1942
- Weatherly Parade, 1944
- Westover, 1946
- The Ridleys, 1947
- Family Roundabout, 1948, republished in 2001 by Persephone Books
- Frost at Morning, 1950
- Linden Rise, 1952
- The Gypsy's Baby, 1954
- Four in Exile, 1954
- Matty and the Dearingroydes, 1956
- Blind Man's Buff, 1957
- Wiseman's Folly, 1959
- The Inheritor, 1960
- The House in the Wood - and other stories, 2022, 25 'lost' stories published by David Schutte
- The Apple Blossom Lady - and other stories, 2023, 27 'lost' stories published by David Schutte
- Oh, Clare! - 133 humorous sketches, 2024, 'lost' humorous sketches published by David Schutte
- The Dream - and other stories, 2024, 32 'lost' stories published by David Schutte

=== Other short stories ===
- Half-an-Hour. Adelaide Observer, 23 December 1922

== Legacy ==
Crompton's stories about William have delighted and influenced a diverse array of notable Britons, including: Antonia Frasier, John Lennon, Norman Tebbit, Michael Palin, Auberon Waugh, Martin Jarvis, and Terry Pratchett.

The novel and TV series Good Omens by Neil Gaiman and Terry Pratchett was inspired by Just William, with the premise being the Antichrist in the place of William, and his gang ("The Them") in place of "The Outlaws". The initial working title for the novel was "William the Antichrist".

Richmal Crompton's archives are held at Roehampton University, London, and at Wat Tyler Country Park, Pitsea, where some members of her family lived. A public house in Bromley is named in her honour and contains framed prints and texts from the William series.

== Sources and further reading ==
- Biography at Just William website.
- Cadogan, Mary (1986). Richmal Crompton: the woman behind William. London: Allen & Unwin. ISBN 9780049280540.
- Mary Cadogan (1990). The William Companion. London: Macmillan. ISBN 0-333-56524-X
- Just William Society website, https://justwilliamsociety.co.uk
- Jane McVeigh: Richmal Crompton, author of Just William : a literary life, Cham : Springer International Publishing, 2022, ISBN 978-3-030-96510-5
- Manchester Authors, Writers and Poets Page at the Papillon Graphics' Virtual Encyclopaedia of Greater Manchester.
- Ian Ousby (1994). The Wordsworth Companion to Literature in English. Wordsworth Editions Ltd. ISBN 1-85326-336-2.
- Kay Williams (1986). Just-Richmal: The Life and Work of Richmal Crompton Lamburn. Guildford: Genesis. ISBN 0-904351-35-1.
