= Just William =

Book by Richmal Crompton

- Original cover
- Author: Richmal Crompton
- Illustrator: Thomas Henry
- Language: English
- Genre: Children's literature
- Publisher: George Newnes
- Publication date: 1922
- Publication place: United Kingdom
- Media type: Print (hardback & paperback) & Audio book & film
- Followed by: More William

William Brown in William below stairs

Just William is the first book of children's short stories about the young school boy William Brown, written by Richmal Crompton, and published in 1922. The book was the first in the series of William Brown books which was the basis for numerous television series, films and radio adaptations. Just William is also sometimes used as a title for the series of books as a whole, and is also the name of various television, film and radio adaptations of the books. The William stories first appeared in Home magazine and Happy Mag.

== Short stories ==
The book contains the following short stories:

- William Goes to the Pictures – William's aunt gives him a shilling, so he buys sweets and goes to the cinema. On his way back home he is obsessed with acting out what he has seen.
- William the Intruder – William steals the attentions of his brother's new crush.
- William Below Stairs – William runs away from home after reading a book about a boy who ran away and made a fortune in gold. He gets a job working as a servant in an upper-class household.
- The Fall of the Idol – William has a crush on his teacher Miss Drew, but eventually discovers she has "feet of clay".
- The Show – William and his friends, who call themselves The Outlaws, put on an animal show in William's room for money and finally decide to use his sleeping Aunt Emily as an exhibit.
- A Question of Grammar – William's wilful misunderstanding of a double negative leads him to throw a wild party in his parents' absence.
- William Joins the Band of Hope – William is forced to join the Temperance movement along with the other Outlaws, but manages to turn the first meeting into a punch-up.
- The Outlaws – The first-ever William story. William is forced to spend his precious half-holiday looking after a baby but decides to kidnap him and bring him to the Outlaws.
- William and White Satin – When William is forced to be a page at his cousin's wedding, he becomes a figure of ridicule. However, he soon finds an ally in an equally reluctant bridesmaid, his cousin.
- William's New Year's Day – William is encouraged to make a New Year's resolution by the sweet shop owner Mr Moss. He decides to be polite for New Years Day and ends up looking after the Sweet Shop.
- The Best Laid Plans – A young man misguidedly enlists William's help in wooing his sister Ethel.
- "Jumble" – The story of how William met his dog Jumble.

The 2022 "100th anniversary edition" removes "William the Intruder", largely due to William's "Red Indian" (an offensive portrayal of a Native American hunter) persona he adopts over the course of the story. In addition to this, the order of the remaining stories has been changed.

== Characters ==
William Brown is an eleven-year-old boy, eternally scruffy and frowning. William and his friends, Ginger, Henry, and Douglas, call themselves The Outlaws, and meet at the old barn in Farmer Jenks' field, with William being the leader of the gang. The Outlaws are sworn enemies of the Hubert Lane-ites, with whom they frequently clash.

Ginger is William's faithful friend and almost as tousled, reckless and grimy as William himself. He has been known to take over in William's absence and is his best friend. Henry brings an air of wisdom to the otherwise non-academic Outlaws. Never liking to own up to being at a loss, he can always deliver the knowledge that the Outlaws need. In the first book, it is revealed that he is the oldest of the Outlaws. Douglas, perhaps the most pessimistic of the Outlaws (though it has never stopped him joining in with any lawless activity), is the best of them at spelling. He spells knights "gnights" and knocks "gnocks". The Outlaws take pride in this because, unlike them, he knows the contrariness of the English language.

William's family – his elder, red-gold-haired sister Ethel and brother Robert, “placid” mother and “stern” father, and many elderly aunts do not make William feel understood. Only his mother tends to have sympathy for him, though his father sometimes shows a side of himself which implies he was once like William himself.

Other recurring characters include Violet Elizabeth Bott, lisping spoiled daughter of the local nouveau riche millionaire (whose companionship William reluctantly endures, to prevent her carrying out her threat "I'll thcream and thcream 'till I'm thick"), and Joan Clive, the dark-haired girl for whom William has a soft spot. Joan is sometimes considered a member of the Outlaws (the only girl entitled to this high privilege) and sometimes an "Outlaw ally", because she took a special oath. At one point she went away to boarding school, but continued to appear in William's adventures during her holidays.

William writes stories (The Tale of The Bloody Hand), although most of these are written in terrible grammar, to much comic effect. He likes to perform drama, and is fond of white rats, bull's eyes, football, and cricket.

A notable feature of the stories is the subtle observance of the nature of leadership. William often has to reconcile his own ambitions with the needs of the individuals within the Outlaws. His strength of personality means that his leadership is never questioned. William rarely exercises his power over the Outlaws without conscience.

William has a few arch-enemies, Hubert Lane being the most sought after. Others include Hubert's lieutenant Bertie Franks, and other confederates.
