= List of Jon Pertwee credits =

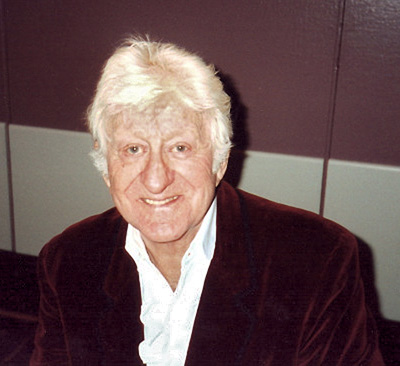
Pertwee in 1996

John Devon Roland Pertwee (7 July 1919 – 20 May 1996), known professionally as Jon Pertwee, was an English actor who appeared in film, television, theatre, radio and video games over a career spanning nearly six decades.

He is best known for portraying the third incarnation of the Doctor in the science fiction television series Doctor Who (1970–1974, 1983), the title character in the children's television series Worzel Gummidge (1979–1981, 1987–1989) and Chief Petty Officer Pertwee in the long-running radio sitcom The Navy Lark (1959–1977). His other notable credits include four Carry On films, the ITV game show Whodunnit? and numerous stage productions in London's West End and on Broadway.

== Acting credits ==
=== Film ===
Year	Title	Role	Notes	Ref.
1937	Dinner at the Ritz			
1938	A Yank at Oxford	Minor Role	Uncredited	
1939	The Four Just Men	Rally Campaigner	Uncredited	
1939	Young Man's Fancy			
1946	Fun Fair		Cartoon; voice	
1947	Dancing with Crime	Police Constable	Uncredited	
1947	Big City		Short film; voice	
1948	Trouble in the Air	Truelove		
1948	William Comes to Town	Circus Superintendent		
1948	A Piece of Cake	Mr. Short		
1948	The Old Manor House		Short film; voice	
1949	Murder at the Windmill	Detective Sergeant	(as Jon Pertwer)	
1949	Helter Skelter	Headwaiter / Charles II		
1949	Dear Mr. Prohack	Plover		
1949	Miss Pilgrim's Progress	Postman Perkins		
1950	The Body Said No!	Watchman		
1950	Devon Whey		Short film; voice	
1950	Take it Away		Short film; voice	
1951	Mr Drake's Duck	Reuben		
1953	Will Any Gentleman...?	Charley Sterling		
1954	The Gay Dog	A Betting Man		
1955	A Yank in Ermine	Slowburn Jenks		
1955	Ingot Pictorial No. 23		Short film; narrator	
1956	It's a Wonderful World	Conductor	Uncredited	
1957	Water Ski-ing		Short documentary; narrator	
1959	The Ugly Duckling	Victor Jekyll		
1960	Just Joe	Prendergast		
1960	Not a Hope in Hell	Dan		
1960	Blue Phantom		Short documentary; narrator	
1960	Then and Now		Short promotional film; narrator	
1961	Nearly a Nasty Accident	General Birkinshaw		
1963	Ladies Who Do	Sidney Tait		
1964	Carry On Cleo	Soothsayer		
1964	The Quay to the Tor		Short documentary; narrator	
1965	I've Gotta Horse	Costumier's assistant		
1965	You Must Be Joking!	Storekeeper (Hare Factory)	Uncredited	
1965	Carry On Cowboy	Sheriff Albert Earp		
1965	How to Undress in Public Without Undue Embarrassment	Adam		
1966	Carry On Screaming!	Doctor Fettle		
1966	A Funny Thing Happened on the Way to the Forum	Crassus		
1966	Runaway Railway	Station Master		
1968	Jack and the Beanstalk		Short film; narrator	
1969	Up in the Air	Figworthy		
1969	Under the Table You Must Go	Himself	Documentary	
1970	I Understand		Short film; narrator	
1971	The House That Dripped Blood	Paul Henderson	Anthology film; "The Cloak"	
1975	One of Our Dinosaurs Is Missing	Colonel		
1975	Faster than Fairies		Short documentary; narrator	
1977	Adventures of a Private Eye	Judd Blake		
1977	No. 1 of the Secret Service	The Rev. Walter Braithwaite		
1978	The Water Babies	Salmon / Kraken	Voice	
1978	Wombling Free	Womble	Voice	
1981	Zanussi - The Appliance of Science	Third Doctor	Corporate video	
1983	The Boys in Blue	Coastguard		
1985	The Little Green Man	Narrator		
1992	Carry On Columbus	Duke of Costa Brava		
1993	The Airzone Solution	Oliver Threthewey		
1994	The Zero Imperative	Dr. Jeremiah O'Kane	Direct-to-video	
1994	Cloud Cuckoo	Grandfather	Short film	

=== Television ===
Year	Title	Role	Notes	Ref.
1947	The Wandering Jew	Boemond, Prince of Tarentum	TV movie	
1947	Toad of Toad Hall	The Judge	TV movie	
1947	Mediterranean Merry-Go-Round		2 episodes	
1957	Rise About It		TV movie	
1958	Ivanhoe	Peter the Peddler	Episode: "The Swindler"	
1958	Dick Whittington and his Cat	Alderman Fitzwarren	TV movie	
1959	Glencannon	Champagne Charlie	Episode: "Champagne Charlie"	
1963	The Dickie Henderson Show	Uncredited	Episode: "The Hypnotist"	
1965	A Slight Case of...	Uncredited	Episode: "The Enemy Within"	
1965	Mother Goose	The Squire	TV movie	
1966	David Nixon's Comedy Bandbox	Guest	1 episode	
1966–1967	Jackanory	Storyteller	20 episodes	
1967	The Avengers	Brigadier Whitehead	Episode: "From Venus with Love"	
1967	Beggar My Neighbour	Major Henley	1 episode	
1970–1974	Doctor Who	Third Doctor	128 episodes	
1973	The Generation Game	Vampire	New Year Special	
1974–1978	Whodunnit?	Presenter	41 episodes	
1975	The Goodies	Reverend Llewellyn Llewellyn Llewellyn Llewellyn	Episode: "Wacky Wales"	
1977	Four Against the Desert	Staff	TV movie	
1979–1981	Worzel Gummidge	Worzel Gummidge	31 episodes	
1982	The Saturday Show	Worzel Gummidge		
1982	The Curious Case of Santa Claus	Dr. Merryweather		
1983–1986	SuperTed	Spotty	Voice; 36 episodes	
1983	Doctor Who	Third Doctor	Episode: "The Five Doctors"	
1984	Omnibus	James McNeill Whistler	Docudrama	
1985	Do You Know the Milkyway?	Dr. Neuross	TV movie	
1985	The Little Green Man	Narrator	Voice; 13 episodes	
1986	SuperTed: Super Safe with SuperTed	Spotty		
1987–1989	Worzel Gummidge Down Under	Worzel Gummidge	22 episodes	
1988	Starwatch	Commander Jason Havlin		
1989	The Further Adventures of SuperTed	Spotty	Voice; English (UK) version; 13 episodes	
1991	Doctor Who: The Troughton Years	Presenter	Video	
1992	Rear Window	Dr. Solomon	Episode: "Tales Out of School: The Fiction of Geoffrey Trease"	
1992	Virtual Murder	Luis Silverado	Episode: "A Torch for Silverado"	
1992	Doctor Who: The Pertwee Years	Presenter	Video	
1993	Noel's House Party	Third Doctor	In character, introducing Dimensions in Time	
1993	Dimensions in Time	Third Doctor	2 episodes; Children in Need charity special	
1994	The Zero Imperative	Dr. Jeremiah O'Kane	Video	
1994	Myth Makers Vol. 7: Wendy Padbury	Spottyman	Video	
1995	The Young Indiana Jones Chronicles	General Von Kramer	Episode: "Attack of the Hawkmen"	
1995	Live with the Goggles	Worzel Gummidge		
2009	Devious	Third Doctor	Short fan film; partially released on The War Games 2009 DVD	

=== Theatre ===
Year	Title	Role	Notes	Ref.
1938	Interference			
1938	The Simpleton of the Unexpected Isles		Festival Theatre, Cambridge	
1938	Goodbye, Mr. Chips		Q Theatre	
1939	To Kill a Cat	Esmond Proust	Aldwych Theatre, London, Q Theatre, London, and other locations	
1952	Ranch in the Rockies	Hemlock Soames	Empress Hall, Earls Court, London	
1952–1953	Wonderful Time	A Prospector / performer / The Pupils	London Palladium and London Hippodrome	
1957–1958	Touch It Light	Ogleby	Theatre Royal, Strand Theatre and other locations	
1962	See You Inside		Various locations	
1963–1965	A Funny Thing Happened on the Way to the Forum	Marcus Lycus	Strand Theatre	
1966–1972	There's a Girl in My Soup	Andrew	Golders Green Hippodrome, Globe (Shaftesbury Ave), London and other locations	
1967–1968	There's a Girl in My Soup	Andrew	Music Box Theatre, New York City	
1968–1969	Oh, Clarence!	Sir Gregory Parsloe-Parsloe	Lyric Theatre (Shaftesbury Ave), London, Opera House, and other locations	
1974	The Bedwinner	Pat Plummer	Royalty Theatre	
1975–1976	Irene	Madame Lucy	Adelphi Theatre, London	
1979–1980	Jack and the Beanstalk		Ashcroft Theatre, Croydon	
1980–1981	Worzel Gummidge	Worzel Gummidge	Birmingham Repertory Theatre	
1981–1982	Worzel Gummidge	Worzel Gummidge	Cambridge Theatre, London	
1989	Doctor Who The Ultimate Adventure	Third Doctor	Wimbledon Theatre	
1992–1993	Scrooge	Jacob Marley		

=== Audio drama ===
Year	Title	Role	Notes	Ref.
1938	Voyage to the Sun		BBC radio debut	
1938	Lillibulero		Recorded in Northern Ireland	
1993	Doctor Who: The Paradise of Death	Third Doctor		
1996	Doctor Who: The Ghosts of N-Space	Third Doctor		
2003	Doctor Who: The Monthly Adventures	Third Doctor	Story: "Zagreus"; Archival audio	

=== Video games ===
Year	Title	Role	Notes	Ref.
1984	Deus Ex Machina	The Storyteller		
1995	Discworld	Fool / Chucky / Windle Poons		
1997	Doctor Who: Destiny of the Doctors	Third Doctor	Archival audio	
2015	Lego Dimensions	Third Doctor	Archival audio	

== Discography ==
=== Albums ===
Year	Title	Label	Notes	Ref.
1962	Jon Pertwee Sings Songs For Vulgar Boatmen	Philips Records		
1965	I've Gotta Horse	Decca Records	Contributor	
1966	Children's Favourites	Music for Pleasure	Contributor	
1966	Oliver!	Music for Pleasure	Contributor	
1966	My Fair Lady	Regal	Contributor	
1968	The Arcadians	Columbia Records	Contributor	
1969	The Water Babies	Major Minor	Contributor	
1972	Wonderful Children's Songs (with June Whitfield)	Contour		
	David Frost Presents The Pied Piper (Of Hamelin)	Starline		
1975	Songs from Hans Andersen and others (with Laura Lee and the Malcolm Lockyer Orchestra)	Contour		
1976	Irene	EMI Records		
1980	Worzel Gummidge Sings (with Una Stubbs and Geoffrey Bayldon)	Decca Records		
1980	Treasure Island	Pinnacle Storyteller		
1980	Journey To The Centre Of The Earth	Pinnacle Storyteller		
1981	Worzel Gummidge (with Una Stubbs and Geoffrey Bayldon)	Multi Media Tapes		
1982	Worzel Gummidge Sings	Decca Records		
1993	A Funny Thing Happened On The Way To The Forum	EMI Records	Contributor	

=== Singles ===
Year	Title	Label	Notes	Ref.
1969	"The Runaway Train"/"The Ugly Duckling" (with Jessie Matthews)	Music for Pleasure		
1972	"Who is the Doctor"	Purple Records	Cover of the Doctor Who theme music	
1973	"I Know An Old Lady Who Swallowed A Fly"	Music for Pleasure		
1976	"I'm The Noodle Doodle Man"	Heinz	Promotional single for Heinz	
1980	"Worzel's Song"	Decca Records	Reached No. 33 on the UK charts	
1980	"The Worzel Gummidge Christmas Maxi Single"	Decca Records	Contributor	
1981	"Pride Of Bamburgh" (with Tom Matthews)	Cambar Records		
1983	"SuperTed The Music"	Rainbow Communications	Contributor	
1984	"Jon Pertwee and Friends Sing the Beatles"	Flightline Promotions	Charity single for the Liverpool Children's Hospital	
