= Murder at the Windmill =

- Directed by: Val Guest
- Written by: Val Guest
- Based on: original story by Val Guest
- Produced by: Daniel Angel
- Starring: Garry Marsh; Jon Pertwee; Jack Livesey; Eliot Makeham; Jimmy Edwards
- Cinematography: Bert Mason
- Edited by: Douglas Myers
- Music by: Ronald Hanmer
- Production companies: Angel Productions; Grand National Pictures
- Distributed by: Associated British Film Distributors (United Kingdom); Monogram Pictures (United States)
- Release dates: 1949 (United Kingdom); 1950 (United States)
- Running time: 70 minutes
- Country: United Kingdom
- Language: English
- Budget: under £50,000

Murder at the Windmill (U.S. title: Mystery at the Burlesque, also known as Murder at the Burlesque ) is a 1949 British crime film directed and written by Val Guest and starring Garry Marsh, Jon Pertwee, Jack Livesey, Eliot Makeham and Jimmy Edwards.

It was shot at Walton Studios and was the first film to show footage inside the Windmill Theatre. There is also footage of Archer Street, outside.

It was the first feature produced by Daniel Angel and the first feature invested in by Nat Cohen.

== Plot ==
After a performance at London's Windmill Theatre, a member of the audience is found dead. When the Metropolitan Police investigate, they find he was shot, apparently from the direction of the stage, so with the entire cast suspect, they are asked to perform the show again.

== Cast ==
- Garry Marsh as Detective Inspector
- Jon Pertwee as Detective Sergeant
- Jack Livesey as Vivian Van Damm
- Eliot Makeham (credited as Elliot Makeham) as "Gimpy"
- Jimmy Edwards as Himself
- Diana Decker as Frankie
- Donald Clive as Donald
- Jill Anstey as Patsy
- Peter Butterworth as Police Constable
- Margo Johns (credited as Margot Johns) as Box Office Girl

== Production ==
According to a 1988 interview with Val Guest, a number of people had tried to get permission for making a film about the Windmill but been refused by Vivian Van Damm. Daniel Angel managed to get the rights because he was the son in law of Van Damm. Angel approached Guest to write and direct because he knew Guest had written sketches for the Windmill. Guest thought up a story overnight which was approved by Van Damm. Guest said: "... we went on the floor, we built the Windmill in the studio, we did a few things at the Windmill but not a lot, we built it all in the studio, we did it with numbers, shot it with production numbers and everything in 17 days."

Guest wrote several songs for the film. The movie was co-financed by Nat Cohen who received a "presents" credit alongside Angel. The film was also financed by Grand National Pictures.

Filming started after Christmas in 1948.

== Reception ==
=== Box office ===
According to Guest the film "went out and made a fortune." He and Angel made several more movies together: The Body Said No, Miss Pilgrim's Progress and Mr Drake's Duck.

== Critical reception ==
The Monthly Film Bulletin wrote: "Although the story is far from original, the authentic settings, and glimpses of life on the other side of the curtain at the Windmill, are sure to appeal to most audiences, and whilst some of the company seem a little out of their element on the screen, the addition of such seasoned film actors as Eliot Makeham, as Gimpy, and Garry Marsh and Jon Pertwee, as an amusing pair of policemen, lends the necessary support to their efforts. Diana Decker is attractively vivacious as the show's leading lady."

Kine Weekly wrote: "Much less ambitious but considerably more entertaining than To-Night and Every Night, America's highly coloured tribute to the "music hall that never closed," it is certain to go down well with the crowd."

Variety wrote: "Despite story triteness, it moves along okay and the footage is only 58 minutes, keying it for lowercase bookings. ... A little more time on development of meller factors would have helped."

In the Radio Times, David McGillivray wrote, "partly filmed in situ, with performers and staff playing themselves, this creaky whodunnit is a valuable record, within the bounds of the strict censorship of the day, of the lowbrow songs and sketches that made the theatre famous. Jimmy Edwards's spot, dreadful now, was thought hilarious at the time, and won the whiskery comic his part in radio's celebrated Take It from Here."

TV Guide thought the film was "hampered by trite dialog and an easy solution," and "the mystery is little more than an excuse to film a few song and dance numbers. These are nicely staged and come off a good deal better than the investigation."
