= Philip Martell =

British composer and musical director, Hammer Studios (1907–1993)

Philip Martell (6 October 1907 – 11 August 1993) was a British composer, arranger, musical director, orchestra leader, and most notably head of music at Hammer Studios.

== Early life ==
Born in Whitechapel and brought up in the East End, Martell began to play the violin at the age of five, enrolling at the Guildhall School of Music in 1919, aged 11. After graduation he began working in the West End of London as leader and then conductor, and also became involved with the early film industry, arranging sequences of classical music to accompany silent films. But as sound came to films in the 1930s Martell returned to the theatre, and also formed his own orchestra, The Forum Orchestra, in 1936. By the early 1950s he was conducting London productions of top musicals and shows, such as Love From Judy (Saville Theatre, September 1952), After the Ball (Globe Theatre, 1954) and Free as Air (Savoy Theatre, 1957).

== Film career ==
Martell received his first film credit as musical director in 1949 on Val Guest's Murder at the Windmill and was both musical director and composer of the film score to Guest's Miss Pilgrim's Progress (1950). He was sponsored by Guest to join Hammer Studios in 1954. He succeeded John Hollingsworth as musical director after Hollingsworth's death in 1963, and also composed the scores to the 1966 Lindsay Shonteff film Run with the Wind , the 1968 Hammer film The Anniversary, starring Bette Davis and (with Don Ellis) Moon Zero Two (1969).

Like his colleagues Ernest Irving (at Ealing), Muir Mathieson (at Denham) and Hubert Clifford (at the London Film Studios), Martell engaged a wide variety of leading musicians to contribute scores, including classical concert music composers still young and not yet skilled in film music, such as Don Banks, Richard Rodney Bennett, Wilfred Josephs, John McCabe, Paul Patterson, and Malcolm Williamson. He also engaged more experienced film composers such as Malcolm Arnold, Elisabeth Lutyens and James Bernard. Martell was an advocate of using the largest orchestra obtainable from the film's budget. "On horrors as a rule you need a lot of brass", he said. However, in his later work he shifted more towards jazz and pop idioms.

Martell also composed TV music and conducted the London Casino Orchestra. In the 1970s he was living at 23 Woodland Gardens, London, NW10. He died in London aged 86.
