= 80,000 Suspects =

1963 British film by Val Guest

- US poster
- Directed by: Val Guest
- Written by: Val Guest
- Based on: Pillars of Midnight by Elleston Trevor
- Produced by: Val Guest
- Starring: Claire Bloom; Richard Johnson; Yolande Donlan; Cyril Cusack
- Cinematography: Arthur Grant
- Edited by: Bill Lenny
- Music by: Stanley Black
- Production company: Val Guest Productions
- Distributed by: The Rank Organisation
- Release date: 15 August 1963 (London)
- Running time: 113 minutes
- Country: United Kingdom
- Language: English
- Budget: £250,000

80,000 Suspects is a 1963 British drama film directed by Val Guest and starring Claire Bloom, Richard Johnson, Yolande Donlan and Cyril Cusack. It was written by Guest based on the 1957 novel Pillars of Midnight by Elleston Trevor. An outbreak of smallpox in Bath, England leads to a race to contain the virus.

The film was not released in the United States.

== Plot ==
On New Year's Eve in the city of Bath, Dr. Steven Monks diagnoses a mystery patient with smallpox and triggers a citywide quarantine to contain the outbreak. His commitment to the task is affected by the deterioration of his marriage following his clandestine affair with a family friend. His wife Julie becomes infected with the virus. The medical team gradually contains the outbreak until only one case remains, that of Ruth Preston, the woman with whom Monks had been having an affair and the wife of his close colleague Clifford. Ruth is traced to a deserted hotel where she is sheltering, lonely and desperately ill.

== Cast ==
- Claire Bloom as Julie Monks
- Richard Johnson as Steven Monks
- Yolande Donlan as Ruth Preston
- Cyril Cusack as Father Maguire
- Michael Goodliffe as Clifford Preston
- Mervyn Johns as Buckridge
- Kay Walsh as Matron
- Norman Bird as Harold Davis
- Vanda Godsell as Agnes Davis
- Andrew Crawford as Dr. Ruddling
- Jill Curzon as Nurse Jill
- Ursula Howells as Joanna Druten
- Basil Dignam as Medical Officer Boswell
- Arthur Christiansen as Mr. Gracey
- Ray Barrett as Health Inspector Bennett
- Graham Moffatt as fat man in vaccination line (uncredited)

== Original novel ==
The novel was published in 1957. It was adapted for television as Pillars of Midnight in 1958.

== Production ==
Film rights were bought by Val Guest who raised money through the Rank Organistation. The film was shot in early 1963 on location in Bath, England and the city's population at the time inspired the name of the film.

== Reception ==
The Monthly Film Bulletin wrote: "A veneer of authenticity (Bath locations, queues for vaccination, hospital staff eternally hopping in and out of decontamination units) is effectively smothered by the collection of appallingly stock characters and situations. Richard Johnson and Claire Bloom mouth all those married-couple platitudes, about taking a long look at their marriage and being brought together by shared experiences as if they had only just been thought of; Yolande Donlan, as an unsatisfied wife given to drink and free love, oozes little girl charm and ends up, like Mrs. Danvers, in flames in Ye OId Dark House; Michael Goodliffe, as her hangdog husband, suffers expressionlessly; and Cyril Cusack, as the wryly humorous Catholic priest, nobly kisses a Protestant smallpox patient on the brow. Val Guest's (rather strained) flair for story-telling, and the Bath locations keep things more or less ticking over."

Variety wrote: "Val Guest is successfully following his method of making pix that combine a documentary flavor with a fictional, human interest. This time the combo doesn't quite jell yet 80,000 Suspects has a holding interest and is screened with a professional know-how that rarely flags. It hasn't the impact of his film The Day The Earth Caught Fire [1961], but nevertheless emerges as a worthy boxoffice entrant."

Sight and Sound wrote: "Guest does his best to give both narrative threads equal weight, which proves engrossing up to a point, but the film flags appreciably when the outbreak element peaks too early; and the characterisation on the domestic front never quite delineates the couple's marital malaise with enough insight to make it something special. Still, as in Jigsaw [1962], there's a definite sense that old moral certainties have become much more flexible – something Cyril Cusack's presence as a worldly priest makes clear – and Johnson, never the most nimble of performers, puts in a decent shift as the harassed medic realising that he's lost the ability to feel anything much at all."
