= Daniel M. Angel =

British film producer (1911–1999)

Major Daniel Morris Angel (14 May 1911 – 13 December 1999) was a British film producer who was responsible for several notable British films during the 1950s, such as Another Man's Poison (1952), The Sea Shall Not Have Them (1954), Reach for the Sky (1956), and Carve Her Name with Pride (1958).

One obituary called him "An irascible man with strong opinions and a somewhat draconian manner, Angel was utterly dedicated to the medium of film."

He was the subject of This Is Your Life in 1958 when he was surprised by Eamonn Andrews at the BBC Television Theatre.

== Biography ==
Angel was educated at University College School, London. He came from a family who ran a theatrical costume business, Angel's.

Angel served in Burma during World War Two, where he was a major. On waking up after an operation for appendicitis, he was told that he had contracted polio and would never walk again. He spent two years in base hospital then was shipped to England, where he rejoined the family firm, which had become Angel's and Berman's. He learned how to move around in a wheelchair then taught himself to walk using a cane. He would walk on crutches until 1971 when he began using a wheelchair full-time.

In 1945 he married Betty Van Damm, the daughter of Vivian Van Damm, the General Manager of the Windmill Theatre in London.

In 1946 he used his army pension to buy a film camera. He wrote to King George VI and asked permission to film the Royal stables. This resulted in a documentary, All the King's Horses which made a profit of £5,000. He used this to make a series of documentaries, including All the King's Men and All the King's Music, making a profit of £30,000. He moved into features with Murder at the Windmill (1949).

In 1960, Angel, along with John Woolf became one of the first film producers to sell his work to television. This enraged the industry and for several years his films were boycotted by distributors and cinemas.

His last feature film was The Romantic Englishwoman (1975).

In 1980 Angel successfully sued actor Kenneth More for libel over comments made in More's second autobiography.

Angel retired and lived in America, Switzerland, France and, in his latter years, once more in London. His wife died two days after him. They were survived by their two daughters, both of whom are theatrical agents.

== Filmography ==
- All the King's Horses (1946) (documentary) – producer
- Dancing Thru (1946) (documentary) – producer
- All the King's Men (1947) (documentary) – producer
- The King's Navy (1948) (documentary) – producer
- Murder at the Windmill (1949) – produced with Nat Cohen, directed by Val Guest
- Miss Pilgrim's Progress (1950) – produced with Nat Cohen, directed by Val Guest
- The Body Said No! (1950) – producer, directed by Val Guest
- Mr Drake's Duck (1951) – produced with Douglas Fairbanks Jr., directed by Val Guest
- Another Man's Poison (1951) – produced with Douglas Fairbanks Jr., directed by Irving Rapper
- Twilight Women (1952) – producer
- Cosh Boy (1953) – producer, directed by Lewis Gilbert
- Albert, R.N. (1953) – producer, directed by Lewis Gilbert
- Harmony Lane (1954) (short) – producer, directed by Lewis Gilbert
- The Sea Shall Not Have Them (1954) – producer, directed by Lewis Gilbert
- Escapade (1955) – producer, directed by Philip Leacock
- Cast a Dark Shadow (1955) – executive producer, directed by Lewis Gilbert
- Reach for the Sky (1956) – producer, directed by Lewis Gilbert
- Seven Thunders (1957) – producer, directed by Hugo Fregonese
- Carve Her Name with Pride (1958) – producer, directed by Lewis Gilbert
- The Sheriff of Fractured Jaw (1958) – producer, directed by Raoul Walsh
- We Joined the Navy (1962) – producer, directed by Wendy Toye
- West 11 (1963) – producer, directed by Michael Winner
- King & Country (1964) – executive producer, directed by Joseph Losey
- Three Stars – A Gastronomic Voyage of Discovery in France (1964–65) (TV series) – executive producer
- The Romantic Englishwoman (1975) – producer, directed by Joseph Losey

== Notes ==
- Obituary, Jewish Chronicle, 18 February 2000, p. 27
