= Arthur Hill (Canadian actor) =

Canadian actor (1922–2006)

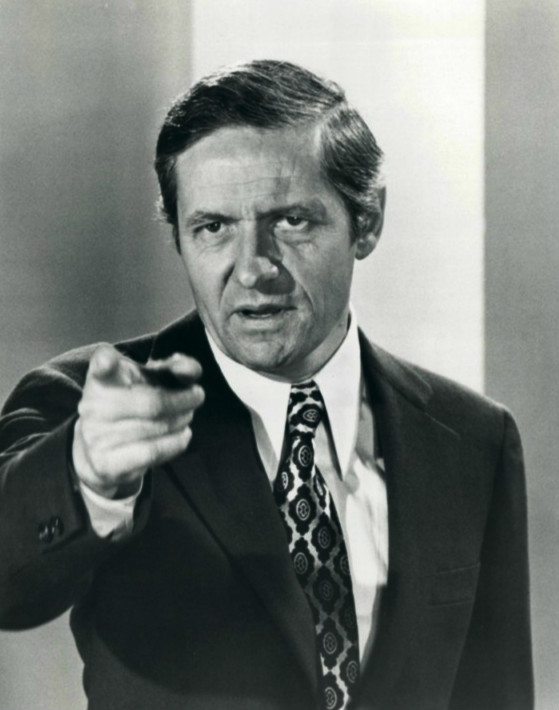
- Hill in Owen Marshall, Counselor at Law (1971).
- Born: Arthur Edward Spence Hill; August 1, 1922; Melfort, Saskatchewan, Canada
- Died: October 22, 2006 (aged 84); Pacific Palisades, California, U.S.
- Education: University of British Columbia
- Occupation: Actor
- Years active: 1949–1990
- Spouses: Peggy Hassard (m. 1942; died 1998) Anne-Sophie Taraba (m. 2001)
- Children: 2
- Military career
- Allegiance: Canada
- Branch: Royal Canadian Air Force
- Conflicts: World War II

Arthur Edward Spence Hill (August 1, 1922 – October 22, 2006) was a Canadian actor of film, stage, and television. He won the Tony Award for Best Actor in a Play for his role as George in the original Broadway production of Who's Afraid of Virginia Woolf? (1962). He was also known for playing the title role on the television legal drama Owen Marshall, Counselor at Law (1971–74).

== Early life ==
Arthur Edward Spence Hill was born in Melfort, Saskatchewan, on August 1, 1922, the son of Edith Georgina (Spence) and Olin Drake Hill, a lawyer. He is sometimes reported as a relative of American actor Steven Hill. However, the two were not related.

Hill attended the University of British Columbia, studying law. As part of the Royal Canadian Air Force during World War II, Hill served in the mechanic corps. After the war, having finished his university degree, he became interested in acting. He studied acting in Seattle.

== Career ==
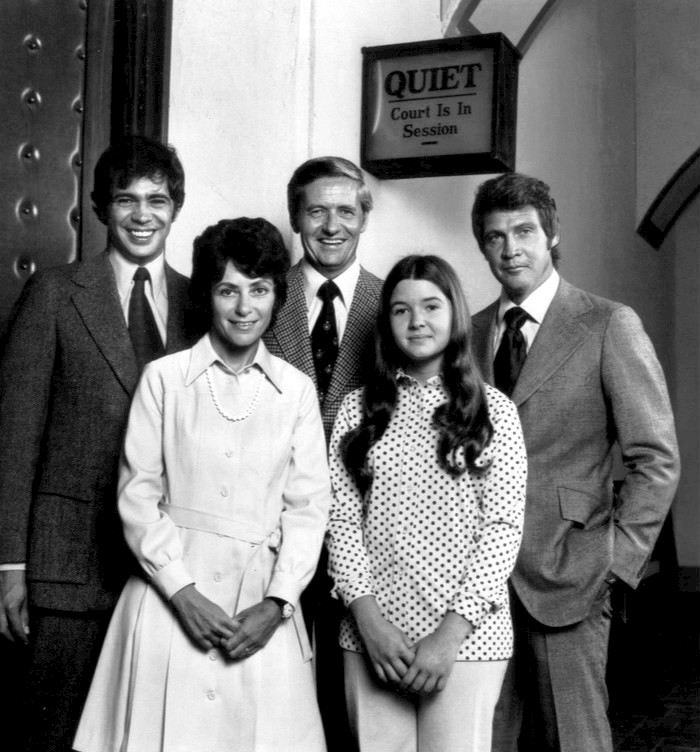
Cast of Owen Marshall, Counselor at Law (1973). Back, L-R: Reni Santoni, Arthur Hill, Lee Majors. Front: Joan Darling and Christine Matchett

In 1956, he appeared as an accused murderer in episode 17 of Colonel March of Scotland Yard, a British ITV television series starring Boris Karloff. Hill's Broadway theatre debut was in the 1957 revival of Thornton Wilder's The Matchmaker, playing Cornelius Hackl. In 1963, Hill received the Tony Award for Best Dramatic Actor for his portrayal of George in the original Broadway production of Who's Afraid of Virginia Woolf? Other Broadway credits include Ben Gant in the original production of Look Homeward, Angel (1957), All the Way Home (1960), Something More! (1964), and More Stately Mansions (1967).

Hill starred as the villain opposite Paul Newman's private eye in the 1966 mystery thriller Harper. In The Andromeda Strain (1971), Hill played Dr. Jeremy Stone. Other film work included The Ugly American (1963), Petulia (1968), The Chairman (1969), The Killer Elite (1975), Futureworld (1976), A Bridge Too Far (1977), and the narration of Something Wicked This Way Comes (1983).

Hill's television work includes the 1964 television drama The Reporter. He also appeared in several television episodes in 1966 and 1967, including: Mission Impossible episode "The Carriers", the Voyage to the Bottom of the Sea episode "The Monster from the Inferno", The F.B.I. episode "Flight to Harbin", and The Invaders episode "The Leeches".

From 1971 to 1974, Hill starred as lawyer Owen Marshall in the television series Owen Marshall, Counselor at Law. Another of his television roles was Grandpa Lansford Ingalls on Little House on the Prairie (1976).

Hill appeared in the 1984 pilot episode of Murder, She Wrote and reprised his role in 1990. His final role was as a governor in the 1990 Columbo episode "Agenda for Murder".

== Personal life ==
Hill married Peggy Hassard in September 1942. They had two children, Douglas and Jennifer. The family moved to Great Britain in 1948. In London, he was at the BBC, both radio and television. They moved to New York City in 1955, then to Los Angeles in 1968.

He retired in 1990. After the death of his wife in 1998, he married Anne-Sophie Taraba in 2001.

=== Death ===
Hill died on October 22, 2006, in Pacific Palisades, California. He lived in a nursing home, and was 84 years old. His death was attributed to Alzheimer's disease.

== Partial filmography ==
- I Was a Male War Bride (1949) as Dependents Clearing Officer (uncredited)
- Miss Pilgrim's Progress (1949) as American Vice-Consul (uncredited)
- The Body Said No! (1950) as Robin King
- Mister Drake's Duck (1951) as American Vice-Consul
- Scarlet Thread (1951) as Shaw
- Salute the Toff (1952) as Ted Harrison
- You're Only Young Twice (1952) as Mystery Man (uncredited)
- Penny Princess (1952) as Representative of Johnson K. Johnson (uncredited)
- Paul Temple Returns (1952) as Cranmer Guest
- A Day to Remember (1953) as Al
- Life with the Lyons (1954) as Slim Cassidy
- The Crowded Day (1954) as Alice's Escort
- Raising a Riot (1955) as American Sergeant (uncredited)
- The Deep Blue Sea (1955) as Jackie Jackson
- Colonel March of Scotland Yard (1955) (Season 1 Episode 17: "The Silver Curtain" as Jerry Winton
- Alfred Hitchcock Presents (1959) (Season 4 Episode 32: "Human Interest Story") as Yangan Dall / 'Howard Wilcox'
- Alfred Hitchcock Presents (1960) (Season 6 Episode 13: "The Man Who Found the Money") as William Benson
- The Young Doctors (1961) as Tomaselli
- The Ugly American (1963) as Grainger
- In the Cool of the Day (1963) as Sam Bonner
- Moment to Moment (1965) as Neil Stanton
- Harper (1966) as Albert Graves
- The Fugitive (1967) (Season 4 Episode 25: "Death of a Very Small Killer") as Doctor
- Petulia (1968) as Barney
- The Chairman (1969) as Shelby
- Don't Let the Angels Fall (1969) as Robert
- Rabbit, Run (1970) as Reverend Jack Eccles
- The Pursuit of Happiness (1971) as John Popper
- The Andromeda Strain (1971) as Dr. Jeremy Stone
- The Killer Elite (1975) as Cap Collis
- Futureworld (1976) as Duffy
- A Bridge Too Far (1977) as U.S. Medical Colonel (uncredited)
- The Champ (1979) as Mike
- A Little Romance (1979) as Richard King
- Butch and Sundance: The Early Days (1979) as Governor (uncredited)
- The Ordeal of Dr. Mudd (1980) as Thomas Ewing Jr.
- Revenge of the Stepford Wives (1980) as Dale 'Diz' Corbett
- Dirty Tricks (1981) as Professor Prosser
- The Amateur (1981) as Brewer
- Making Love (1982) as Henry
- Something Wicked This Way Comes (1983) as Narrator (voice)
- Murder in Space (1985) as Vice President
- One Magic Christmas (1985) as Caleb Grainger
- Tales of the Unexpected (1985) (Season 8 Episode 1: "People Don't Do Such Things") as Terence Carter

== Broadway stage credits ==
From the Internet Broadway Database:

- The Matchmaker (1955–57) as Cornelius Hackl
- Look Homeward, Angel (1957–59) as Ben Gant
- The Gang's All Here (1959–60) as Bruce Bellingham
- All the Way Home (1960) as Jay Follet
- Who's Afraid of Virginia Woolf? (1962–64) as George
- Something More! (1964) as Bill Deems
- More Stately Mansions (1967–68) as Simon Harford

== Awards and nominations ==
Award	Year	Category	Work	Result	Ref.
Tony Award	1963	Best Actor in a Play	Who's Afraid of Virginia Woolf?	Won	
