= Douglas Myers (film editor) =

British film editor

- Born: 15 January 1910; London, United Kingdom
- Died: 1962 (aged 51–52); London, United Kingdom
- Occupation: Editor
- Years active: 1936–1960 (film)

Douglas Myers (1910–1962) was a British film editor.

== Filmography ==
- The Beloved Vagabond (1936)
- The Street Singer (1937)
- Night Journey (1938)
- Sons of the Sea (1939)
- Law and Disorder (1940)
- 'Pimpernel' Smith (1941)
- The First of the Few (1942)
- The Adventures of Tartu (1943)
- Tawny Pipit (1944)
- Twilight Hour (1945)
- Waltz Time (1945)
- The Agitator (1945)
- Murder in Reverse (1945)
- Old Mother Riley at Home (1945)
- Lisbon Story (1946)
- Loyal Heart (1946)
- Who Killed Van Loon? (1948)
- Corridor of Mirrors (1948)
- One Night with You (1948)
- Forbidden (1949)
- Miss Pilgrim's Progress (1949)
- Murder at the Windmill (1949)
- Old Mother Riley's New Venture (1949)
- Old Mother Riley, Headmistress (1950)
- The Late Edwina Black (1951)
- The Wedding of Lilli Marlene (1953)
- The Runaway Bus (1954)
- Life with the Lyons (1954)
- The Lyons in Paris (1955)
- They Can't Hang Me (1955)
- The Gelignite Gang (1956)
- Hour of Decision (1957)
- Professor Tim (1957)
- Undercover Girl (1958)
- Stormy Crossing (1958)
- Blood of the Vampire (1958)
- The Price of Silence (1959)
- Boyd's Shop (1960)

== Bibliography ==
- Gerard Garrett. The films of David Niven. LSP Books, 1975.
