= Penny Princess =

- Directed by: Val Guest
- Written by: Val Guest
- Produced by: Earl St. John; Frank Godwin
- Starring: Dirk Bogarde; Yolande Donlan; Reginald Beckwith
- Cinematography: Geoffrey Unsworth
- Edited by: Alfred Roome
- Music by: Ronald Hanmer
- Production company: Conquest Productions
- Distributed by: General Film Distributors
- Release date: 25 August 1952
- Running time: 91 minutes
- Country: United Kingdom
- Language: English

Penny Princess is a 1952 British Technicolor comedy film written and directed by Val Guest and starring Yolande Donlan, Dirk Bogarde and A. E. Matthews. It was made by Guest for his own production company, Conquest Productions. The film stars his future wife Donlan, who was Guest's production company partner, and features Reginald Beckwith, the other partner in Conquest Productions. It was released by General Film Distributors. It was distributed in America in 1953 by Universal Pictures.

== Plot ==
The fictional European microstate of Lampidorra has "no taxes, no quotas, no tariffs, no forms to fill in". Its two thousand residents make their money from the national (and legal) profession of smuggling to and from its neighbors: France, Italy, and Switzerland. However, the country falls on hard times and becomes bankrupt.

The small state seeks the financial support of the United States in the guise of a rich American who buys the whole country for $100,000. When he dies shortly afterward, Lampidorra is inherited by his distant relative, Lindy Smith, a Macy's shopgirl.

On the way to her new realm, Lindy meets Tony Craig, an inexperienced British salesman trying to sell cheese to the Swiss. When she arrives in Lampidorra, Lindy is met by the ruling triumvirate: the Chancellor, who is a cobbler; the Burgomeister, who is a policeman; and the Minister of Finance, who is a blacksmith. As her first royal decree, she outlaws smuggling. However, this exacerbates the financial crisis, as her inheritance will be tied up for at least six months by legalities.

By chance, teetotaler Lindy gets a bit tipsy when she samples Lampidorran "schneese", a cheese made with Schnapps. She decides it would make a terrific export and has Tony brought to her to help market it. The alcoholic cheese is a sensation, but the other European nations soon respond to the threat to their own cheese industries by imposing tariffs. Lampidorra turns to its traditional smuggling expertise to avoid paying them.

Tony falls in love with Lindy and proposes, but an intercepted telegram from his employer leads Lindy to wrongly suspect he is just after the secret recipe for schneese. The misunderstanding is eventually cleared up. In the end, Lindy finally receives her full inheritance, allowing her to bail out her subjects and depart with Tony.

== Cast ==
- Yolande Donlan as Lindy Smith
- Dirk Bogarde as Tony Craig
- A. E. Matthews as Selby, Tony's employer
- Reginald Beckwith as Minister of Finance / blacksmith
- Mary Clare as Maria
- Edwin Styles as Chancellor / cobbler
- Kynaston Reeves as Burgomaster / policeman
- Desmond Walter-Ellis as Alberto, Captain of the Guard
- Peter Butterworth as Julien / postman / farmer
- Alexander Gauge as MacNabb, the lawyer
- Laurence Naismith as Louis, the jailkeeper
- Eric Pohlmann as Monsieur Paul
- Tom Macaulay as Grieves
- MacDonald Parke as Schuyster, the lawyer
- Fletcher Lightfoot as Grand Duke Johnson the First
- Raf De La Torre as Italian attaché
- Anthony Oliver as Selby's valet
- Arthur Hill as representative of Johnson K. Johnson
- Robert Henderson as Macy's staff manager
- Richard Wattis as hotel desk clerk

== Production ==
Val Guest made the film through the Rank Organisation.

Val Guest attempted to obtain Montgomery Clift, Cary Grant, Robert Cummings and William Holden for the male cheese salesman lead, but they all turned him down. He says Frank Sinatra wanted to do it – this was during a downturn in Sinatra's career – but producer Earl St. John rejected him. Robert Cummings was willing to do it but he was engaged in a television show. St John suggested Dirk Bogarde. Guest said, "I tested him in one scene and it was not very good and he knew it too, which we finally cut from the film. He couldn’t really handle that, but he was very good in the other stuff, and after that of course he did all the Doctor series."

It was made at Pinewood Studios near London. Location shooting took place in Montseny, Catalonia, the first British production to be filmed in Spain. The film's sets were designed by the art director Maurice Carter.

Bogarde later said he thought the film "as funny as a baby's coffin".

== Reception ==
=== Box office ===
Guest said the film "was successful but it didn’t make a fortune. It just about covered itself."

=== Critical ===
The Monthly Film Bulletin wrote: "Unbelievably slim material is carried through with occasionally infectious gusto by Dirk Bogarde and Yolande Donlan, supported by elaborately stolid staging both on location and in the studio. While the plot stays still for a reel or two, there is plenty of time to look at Miss Donlan's skittish antics and listen to her bubbling-stream dialogue. Dirk Bogarde spends most of the picture in his pyjamas. A piece of unimaginative nonsense that may pass an idle hour or so."

Kine Weekly wrote: "Yolande Donlan, delightful as the heroine, imparts essential sparkle. Her gay and infectious performance, amplified by superb settings, gets the modern fairy story over. Attractive British light booking and potential box-office turn-up."

Picturegoer wrote: "What a pity scriptwriter-director Val Guest allowed this quite amusing satirical comedy to over-stay its welcome. It is obvious that the plot is too thin to sustain the hour-and-a-half screen-time, but with careful pruning the second half of this otherwise bright story would have been brighter. ... However, the important thing is that it raises a few laughs. Yolande Donlan sparkles throughout the ninety-one minutes of running time, and Dirk Bogarde makes an admirable team-mate as the somewhat bewildered Englishman."

The Daily Film Renter wrote: "Yolande Donlan's piquant face and toothy charm are exactly right for Lindy and there is never a dull moment in the film when she is gaily present on the screen, Dirk Bogarde, giving an inconsequential light comedy performance, is a fine foil for her, but some of the supporting acting is not up to the standard set by the stars. Both script and direction could have been tauter, but it is pleasant to see an out-of-the-rut story with lovely open-air scenic backgrounds in colour. A woman's picture that men will enjoy."
