= The Runaway Bus =

1954 British film by Val Guest

- Directed by: Val Guest
- Written by: Val Guest
- Produced by: Val Guest
- Starring: Frankie Howerd; Margaret Rutherford; Petula Clark
- Cinematography: Stanley Pavey
- Edited by: Douglas Myers
- Music by: Ronald Binge
- Production company: Conquest-Guest Productions
- Distributed by: Eros Films
- Release date: 16 February 1954
- Running time: 78 minutes
- Country: United Kingdom
- Language: English
- Budget: £45,000

The Runaway Bus (also known as Scream in the Night) is a 1954 British comedy film produced, written and directed by Val Guest. It stars Frankie Howerd, Margaret Rutherford and Petula Clark and an ensemble cast of character actors in a story about a bus caught in fog while a gang of crooks tries to carry off a heist. It was the film debut of Belinda Lee.

The film is referenced in an episode of Frankie Howerd's 1970s radio series.

== Plot ==
When heavy fog wreaks havoc with the plans of air travellers throughout southern England, outspoken Cynthia Beeston, a forceful proponent of "Positive Thought", insists on being taken from London Airport to Blackbushe Airport, where she might be able to fly to Dublin.

Harassed airline employees find emergency relief coach 13 and reserve driver Percy Lamb to transport her. Lamb is so hapless he cannot find his way around the airport, much less the roads. Beeston is joined by mild-mannered Henry Waterman, pulp-thriller addict Janie Grey and Ernest Schroeder. To satisfy a regulation, stewardess "Nikki" Nicholls is assigned to shepherd them. Rounding out the party is airline first officer Peter Jones, who hitches a ride.

Unbeknownst to most of them, robbers have stolen £200,000 worth of gold bullion from the airport bonded store and hidden the proceeds in the boot of the coach.

Two of the crooks are caught. Under questioning by Inspector Henley, one breaks down and admits the gold was stowed on the coach and that the mysterious and notorious "Banker" is the mastermind. Henley informs Percy by radio, but the fog is so thick, Percy has no idea where he is. In mid-call, Peter pokes what Percy thinks is a gun into his back and tells him to keep driving. They wind up at a deserted, booby-trapped village used by the Army for training.

When Schroeder finds a Sten gun, Peter grabs it. Schroeder then informs him that it does not work, and produces a pistol of his own. After a scuffle, it turns out that Peter is working for airport security, while Schroeder is a police officer. Miss Beeston is revealed to be the Banker and she ends up with the gun, as her henchman Henry tries to start the coach. Percy saves the day: he had removed the rotor arm from the engine beforehand, and knocks the pistol out of Miss Beeston's hand with a stone.

== Cast ==
- Frankie Howerd as Percy Lamb
- Margaret Rutherford as Cynthia Beeston
- Petula Clark as Lee "Nikki" Nichols
- George Coulouris as Ernest Shroeder
- Toke Townley as Henry Waterman
- Terence Alexander as Peter Jones
- Belinda Lee as Janie Grey
- John Horsley as Inspector Henley
- Anthony Oliver as duty official
- Stringer Davis as transport officer
- Michael Gwynn as transport dispatcher
- Reginald Beckwith as telephone man
- Marianne Stone as travel girl
- Lionel Murton as American traveller
- Lisa Gastoni as receptionist
- Richard Beynon as transport officer
- Sam Kydd as airport security officer
- Cyril Conway as 1st crook
- Arthur Lovegrove as 2nd crook
- Alastair Hunter as Detective Spencer
- Frank Phillips as BBC newscaster (uncredited)

== Production ==
The huge success of Norman Wisdom in Trouble in Store led to British film companies signing up other comics from TV, radio and variety. The company Eros decided to make a film with Frankie Howerd. Guest says the idea to use Howerd came from Peter Noble.

Val Guest had first met Frankie Howerd backstage in his dressing room at the London Palladium where Howerd was topping the bill in a long-running variety show. The two men became friends. Howerd later said he "wanted to do a comedy thriller. Bob Hope’s first real success was in The Cat and the Canary. I saw it when I was in the army and thought that if I ever get out I’d make a comedy thriller."

Guest said that Howerd was initially reluctant to make a film, "Films? Oho, that's a dangerous game. Get your name up there outside a cinema and if they don't go in it's all your fault! Thank you but no thank you!" Howerd finally agreed, but made three demands. Firstly, Guest had to write a comedy-thriller, so that if the comedy part did not work, the thriller part might. Second, he did not want his name first above the title. And finally, he wanted his favourite comedy actress Margaret Rutherford to be in it.

Howerd's biographer said that The Runaway Bus "was a kind of a cross between a cut-price version of The Cat and the Canary and a very half-hearted reworking of The Ghost Train" which Guest had helped adapt for Arthur Askey. Shooting took five weeks, with a budget of £45,000. It was made at Southall Studios in London with sets designed by the art director Wilfred Arnold.

In September 1953 the New York Times announced that the film would be called Scream in the Night and star Howerd and Belinda Lee, who the paper said had never acted before and was the seventy-seventh girl who auditioned.

Howerd later said Guest "wrote the story but I mostly wrote my own part and we did it. In those days we didn't have much money so in order to make the film ... you set the whole thing in a fog so you wouldn't use much scenery. The great advantage was having Margaret Rutherford in it."

On the last day of filming, Guest realised that the movie was coming in at 72 minutes, three minutes short to qualify as a feature, so Howerd improvised a scene in a phone box.

== Reception ==
The Monthly Film Bulletin wrote: "This is the first film to star Frankie Howerd. He is unable to bring to the cinema those qualities which have made him so successful on the radio and in the music hall, and relies on mannerisms and grimaces which, though often quite funny, are not sufficient to sustain a film. He is not helped by the script, which is at times so involved as to be almost incomprehensible; with a good "feed" and a script better suited to his own style of fantastic comedy he might be more successful. The supporting cast – notably Margaret Rutherford in one of her familiar characterisations and George Coulouris as the man from Scotland Yard – is so strong as rather to overwhelm than to support the star."

Variety called it "boisterous".

Filmink said "Lee is gorgeous to look at and is quite funny; the film did not turn Howerd into a film star (that came later, off the back of TV success) but it is entertaining."

Guest says the film was "enormously" successful. "Everybody made an enormous amount of money out of that... And it comes back time and time again you know it was re-released in movies, in cinemas again and was a very big hit."
