= Yolande Donlan =

American-British actress (1920–2014)

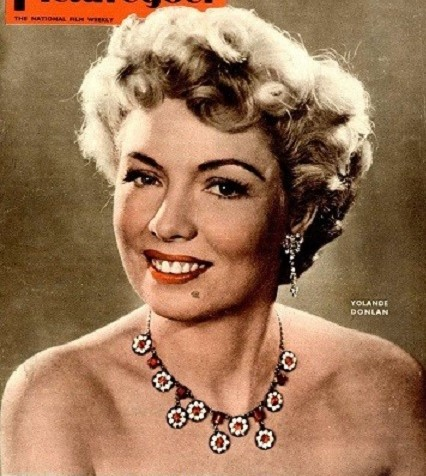
- Donlan in 1951
- Born: June 2, 1920; Jersey City, New Jersey, U.S.
- Died: December 30, 2014 (aged 94); London, England, UK
- Occupation: Actress
- Years active: 1940–1981
- Spouse: Val Guest (m. 1954; died 2006)
- Father: James Donlan

Yolande Donlan (June 2, 1920 – December 30, 2014) was an American-born British-based actress who worked extensively in the United Kingdom.

== Early life and career ==
Donlan was the Jersey City, New Jersey-born daughter of James Donlan, a character actor and singer Teresa Donlan (née Mollot).

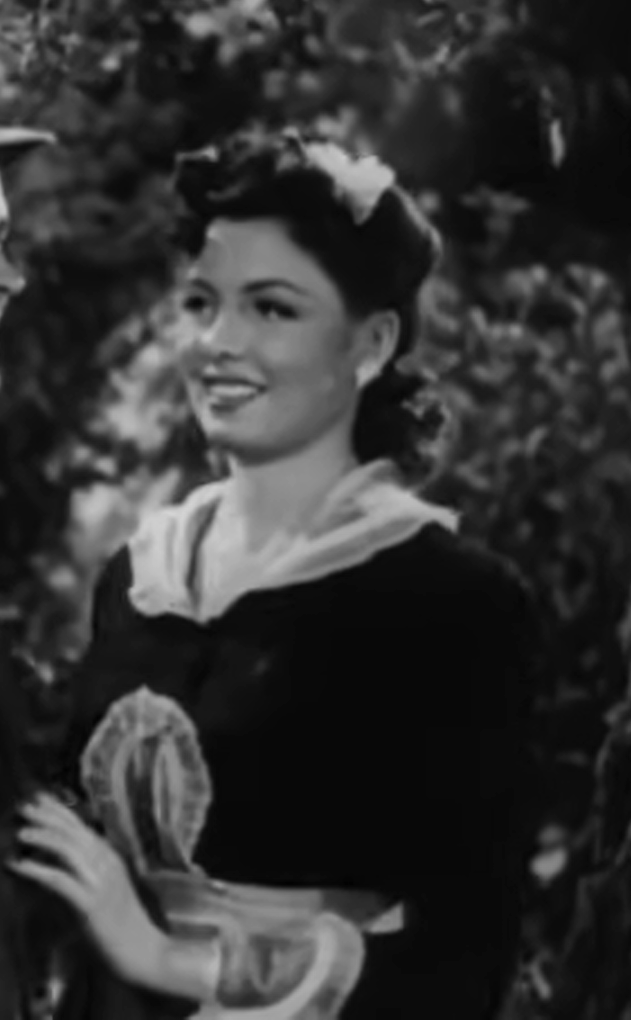
Donlan in The Devil Bat (1940)

Her early credited roles include Frenchy, the maid in the horror film The Devil Bat (1940), with Bela Lugosi, and other small roles often as similar French-accented maid characters. She played Carole Landis' maid in Turnabout (also 1940) and one of Red Skelton's concubines in DuBarry Was a Lady (1942).

Donlan was a success as Billie Dawn in a touring production of Born Yesterday by Garson Kanin. It was the start of bigger things for Donlan. Laurence Olivier flew to Boston to confirm the opinion of American reviewers and chose Donlan to star in his production of the play to be staged in London's West End. The production opened at the Garrick Theatre in January 1947 and was very well received. Donlan was initially denied a work permit to star in the lead in Peter Pan due to complaints from Equity, the actor's union, who felt that a British star should have the lead.

== Later life and career ==
After her run in Peter Pan ended, Donlan remained in the United Kingdom and began accepting film work. After Traveller's Joy (1949), Donlan worked for the director Val Guest as the female lead in several films including Miss Pilgrim's Progress (1949) with Michael Rennie, The Body Said No! (1950), with Michael Rennie; Mister Drake's Duck (1951), with Douglas Fairbanks Jr., and Penny Princess (1952) in the title role co-starring with Dirk Bogarde. In 1950, British exhibitors voted her the most promising female newcomer.

As well as acting in films Donlan continued her career in theatre during this period. Plays that enjoyed notable success were Cage me a Peacock by Noel Langley (1948) and To Dorothy, a Son by Roger MacDougall (1950).

Donlan married Guest in 1954, after their previous marriages had been dissolved. In total, Donlan appeared in eight films directed by her husband. The remaining films are They Can't Hang Me (1955), Expresso Bongo (1959) with Laurence Harvey and Cliff Richard, Jigsaw (1962) with Jack Warner, and 80,000 Suspects (1963) with Richard Johnson.

Further stage success came in 1959 in Jack Popplewell's And Suddenly It's Spring opposite Margaret Lockwood. Other films she made, with other directors, include the first colour Tarzan film, Tarzan and the Lost Safari (1957) with Gordon Scott and Seven Nights in Japan (1976); the latter was her last film role.

== Writing and last years ==
Her autobiographical travelogue, Sand in My Mink (1955) is a humorous tale of holiday adventures taken across Europe with her husband. Her autobiography, Shake the Stars Down, was published in 1976 (known as Third Time Lucky in the USA), which concentrates on her childhood years growing up in the household of her actor father James Donlan in the Hollywood of the 1930s. It also charts her early career as a dancer and actress.

In 2004, a Golden Palm Star on the Palm Springs Walk of Stars was dedicated to her and Guest.

She died in London on December 30, 2014, aged 94.

== Selected filmography ==
- Turnabout (1940) – Marie
- Cross-Country Romance (1940) – Jennie – Diane's maid (uncredited)
- The Devil Bat (1940) – Maxine
- Dark Streets of Cairo (1940) – Maggie Malone, aka Margo Molina
- Road Show (1941) – nurse (uncredited)
- Under Age (1941) – Lily Fletcher
- Life Begins for Andy Hardy (1941) – drugstore waitress (uncredited)
- Miss Pilgrim's Progress (1949) – Laramie Pilgrim
- Traveller's Joy (1949) – Lil Fowler
- The Body Said No! (1950) – Mikki Brent
- Mr Drake's Duck (1951) – Penny Drake
- Penny Princess (1952) – Lindy Smith
- They Can't Hang Me (1955) – Jill Wilson
- Tarzan and the Lost Safari (1957) – Gamage Dean
- Expresso Bongo (1959) – Dixie Collins
- Jigsaw (1962) – Jean Sherman
- 80,000 Suspects (1963) – Ruth Preston
- The Adventurers (1970) – Mrs. Erickson
- Seven Nights in Japan (1976) – American wife

== Theatre credits ==
- 1942 'Dodie' in "Goodnight Ladies", Blackstone Theatre, Chicago.
- 1944 'Julie' in "School for Brides", Royale Theatre, New York.
- 1947 'Billie Dawn' in "Born Yesterday" by Garson Kanin, Garrick Theatre, London.
- 1948 "Rocket to the Moon" by Clifford Odets, St Martin's Theatre, London.
- 1948 'Lucrece' in "Cage me a Peacock" (with Lionel Blair) by Noel Langley, Strand Theatre, London.
- 1950 To Dorothy, a Son (with Richard Attenborough and Sheila Sim), Savoy Theatre, London.
- 1953 "Redheaded Blonde", Vaudeville Theatre, London.
- 1954 "It's Different for Men", Golders Green Hippodrome, London.
- 1957 "Olive Ogilvy", Aldwych Theatre, London.
- 1958 'Lizzie' in "The Rainmaker", Olympia Theatre, Dublin.
- 1959 "Suddenly it's Spring" (with Margaret Lockwood), Duke of Yorks, London.
- 1965 "Dear Wormwood" (with Donald Wolfit and Hywel Bennett), Golders Green Hippodrome, London.
- 1971 "Chorus of Murder", (with Irene Handl and Robert Cawdron) Edinburgh.
- 1972 "Cut-Throat" Theatre Royal, Windsor.
