= Reginald Beckwith =

British actor (1908–1965)

- in Double Bunk (1961)
- Born: William Reginald Beckwith; 2 November 1908; York, England
- Died: 26 June 1965 (aged 56); Bourne End, Buckinghamshire, England
- Years active: 1938–1965

William Reginald Beckwith (2 November 1908 – 26 June 1965) was an English film and television actor, who made over one hundred film and television appearances in his career. He died of a heart attack aged 56.

Beckwith was also a film critic and playwright before the war, and from 1941–45, was a BBC war correspondent. His play Boys in Brown was filmed in 1949, and he co-wrote the film You're Only Young Twice in 1952, based on James Bridie's play.

== Selected filmography ==
- Freedom Radio (1941) as Emil Fenner
- My Brother's Keeper (1948) as 1st Barber (uncredited)
- Scott of the Antarctic (1948) as Bowers / Lt. H.R. Bowers R.I.M.
- Miss Pilgrim's Progress (1949) as Mr. Jenkins
- The Body Said No! (1950) as Benton
- Mr Drake's Duck (1951) as Mr. Boothby
- Circle of Danger (1951) as Oliver
- Another Man's Poison (1951) as Mr. Bigley
- Whispering Smith Hits London (1952) as Manson
- Brandy for the Parson (1952) as Scout Master
- You're Only Young Twice (1952) as BBC Commentator
- Penny Princess (1952) as Minister of Finance - Blacksmith
- The Titfield Thunderbolt (1953) as Coggett
- Genevieve (1953) as J. C. Callahan
- Innocents in Paris (1953) as Photographer (uncredited)
- The Million Pound Note (1953) as Rock
- Don't Blame the Stork (1954)
- Fast and Loose (1954) as Reverend Tripp-Johnson
- The Runaway Bus (1954) as Telephone Man
- Dance Little Lady (1954) as Poldi
- Lease of Life (1954) as Foley
- The Men of Sherwood Forest (1954) as Friar Tuck
- Aunt Clara (1954) as Alfie Pearce
- The Lyons in Paris (1955) as Capt. Le Grand
- Break in the Circle (1955) as Dusty
- They Can't Hang Me (1955) as Harold
- A Yank in Ermine (1955) as Kimp
- Jumping for Joy (1956) as Smithers
- The March Hare (1956) as J. Blacker Insurance Broker
- Charley Moon (1956) as Vicar
- It's a Wonderful World (1956) as Professional Manager
- A Touch of the Sun (1956) as Herbert Hardcastle
- Carry On Admiral (1957) as Receptionist
- These Dangerous Years (1957) as Hairdresser
- Lucky Jim (1957) as University Porter
- Night of the Demon (1957) as Mr. Meek
- Up the Creek (1958) as Publican
- Law and Disorder (1958) as Vickery
- Next to No Time (1958) as Warren
- The Horse's Mouth (1958) as Capt. Jones
- Rockets Galore! (1958) as Mumford
- The Navy Lark (1959) as CNI
- The Captain's Table (1959) as Burtweed
- The 39 Steps (1959) as Lumsden
- The Ugly Duckling (1959) as Reginald
- Friends and Neighbours (1959) as Wilf Holmes
- Upstairs and Downstairs (1959) as Parson
- Expresso Bongo (1959) as Reverend Tobias Craven
- Desert Mice (1959) as Fred
- Bottoms Up (1960) as Bishop Wendover
- Doctor in Love (1960) as Wildewinde
- Dentist in the Chair (1960) as Mr. Watling
- There Was a Crooked Man (1960) as Station Master
- The Girl on the Boat (1961) as Barman
- Five Golden Hours (1961) as Brother Geronimo
- The Night We Got the Bird (1961) as Chippendale Charlie
- Double Bunk (1961) as Harper
- Dentist on the Job (1961) as Mr. Duff
- The Day the Earth Caught Fire (1961) as Harry
- Hair of the Dog (1962) as Fred Tickle
- Night of the Eagle (1962) as Harold Gunnison
- The Password Is Courage (1962) as Unterofficer
- The King's Breakfast (1963) as Magician
- Just for Fun (1963) as Opposition Leader
- The V.I.P.s (1963) as Head Waiter (uncredited)
- Lancelot and Guinevere (1963) as Sir Dagonet
- Doctor in Distress (1963) as Meyer
- Never Put It in Writing (1964) as Lombardi
- A Shot in the Dark (1964) as Receptionist at nudist camp
- The Yellow Rolls-Royce (1964) as Reporter (uncredited)
- Gonks Go Beat (1965) as Professor
- The Amorous Adventures of Moll Flanders (1965) as Doctor
- Mister Moses (1965) as Parkhust
- The Secret of My Success (1965) as Gen. Ferdinand Velez
- The Big Job (1965) as Register Office Official
- Thunderball (1965) as Kenniston
- How to Undress in Public Without Undue Embarrassment (1965)
- Where the Spies Are (1966) as Mr. Kahn (final film role)

=== Television ===
Year	Title	Role	Notes
1956	London Playhouse	Sam Bowler	Episode: "Sam and the Great Unveiling"
1956	Sunday Night Theatre	Peebles / Lovelace Dashworth / Richard Lovelace	3 episodes
1956	Hancock's Half Hour	Mr. Witherspoon	Episode: "The Bequest"
1956–1957	Sailor of Fortune	Commissaire / Police Chief	2 episodes
1957	Armchair Theatre	Mr. Purvis	Episode: "The Great City"
1958	Sword of Freedom	Sandro	Episode: "Francesca"
1958	The Adventures of Robin Hood	Sir Louis	Episode: "Elixir of Youth"
1958	Ivanhoe	Abel	Episode: "The Weavers"
1958	ITV Television Playhouse	Biddle	Episode: "Cornelius"
1959	Hancock's Half Hour	Head of Council Tree Department	Episode: "The Oak Tree"
1960	Dixon of Dock Green	Anglo-Saxon Joy	Episode: "Anglo-Saxon Joy"
1960	Theatre 70	Mr. Morecambe	Episode: "Mr. Morecambe"
1961	BBC Sunday-Night Play	Gilbert Garnish	Episode: "Wet Fish"
1962	Sir Francis Drake	Sir Henry Rainsford	Episode: "The Fountain of Youth"
1962	Saki	Septimus Brope	1 episode
1963	Hancock	Jeweler	Episode: "The Escort"
1963	The Sentimental Agent	Truman-Jones	Episode: "Not Quite Fully Covered"
1964	The Saint	Enderby	Episode: "The High Fence"
