= Another Man's Poison =

1951 British film by Irving Rapper

- Theatrical release poster
- Directed by: Irving Rapper
- Written by: Val Guest
- Based on: Deadlock; 1948 play in Little Theatre, Bristol starring Constance Chapman by Leslie Sands
- Produced by: Daniel M. Angel; Douglas Fairbanks Jr.
- Starring: Bette Davis; Gary Merrill; Emlyn Williams; Anthony Steel; Barbara Murray
- Cinematography: Robert Krasker
- Edited by: Gordon Hales
- Music by: John Greenwood; Paul Sawtell
- Production company: Angel Productions
- Distributed by: Eros Films; United Artists (US)
- Release date: 20 November 1951
- Running time: 90 minutes
- Country: United Kingdom
- Language: English
- Budget: £106,096

Another Man's Poison is a 1951 British crime drama film directed by Irving Rapper and starring Bette Davis, Gary Merrill and Emlyn Williams. The screenplay by Val Guest is based on the play Deadlock by Leslie Sands.

== Plot ==
Successful mystery novelist Janet Frobisher, who has been separated from her husband, Mr Preston — a man with a criminal past —lives in an isolated home in Northern England. Her nearest neighbour is nosy vet, Dr Henderson. Janet has an affair, and falls in love, with her secretary Chris Dale's fiancé, Larry Stevens, who is years younger than she.

One of Preston's criminal cohorts, George Bates, arrives at Janet's home, asking for him, as they are both wanted for murder in connection with a recent bank robbery, and they had planned to escape together. Janet informs Bates that her husband is dead; she poisoned him using horse medication given to her by Dr Henderson, and that she is preparing to dispose of the body in the local lake. When Dr Henderson unexpectedly arrives at the house, Bates impersonates Janet's estranged husband, introducing himself as George Preston. Later, Chris and Larry arrive at the secluded house as Janet and George are preparing to dispose of her husband's body together.

Larry and Janet continue their romance with each other while Chris works as her secretary at the home. Janet has offered George 1000 pounds and a passport to leave the country immediately, but he refuses. She informs George that her husband was not dead but only drugged when he dumped the weighted body into the lake, so that George is guilty of his murder.

George inquires about acquiring London newspapers at the local newsstand. The proprietor informs him they don't carry them, but that Dr Henderson receives one, and offers to ask the doctor to give George his paper when he is through. George tells him not to bother, but later the doctor runs into George and gives him the newspaper. He remarks that George, aka "Mr Preston," somewhat resembles the photo of a George Bates, a man who is wanted in a London bank robbery. Meanwhile, Chris asks Larry if he has been seeing Janet since they met one year earlier.

George and Janet trade accusations and insults. When Chris asks Janet about Larry, Janet admits to their affair, so Chris decides to leave for London. Janet tries to convince Larry to stay with her, but he loves Chris and chases after her, unsuccessfully. George shoots Janet's horse to upset her, claiming the horse had to be destroyed after a riding incident, but Dr Henderson informs her that the horse's only injury was a bullet through the brain. Janet pretends to George that she is remorseful about Larry and Chris, and sends him after Chris in an unsafe vehicle to bring her back to Larry. The car crashes, but to Janet's surprise, George survives. Dr Henderson drops in at Janet's home and speaks to the maid, who informs him that she had never laid eyes on Mr Preston prior to that week, but noticed that he doesn't resemble the man in Janet's wedding photo upstairs.

The next morning, the authorities are dragging the lake because Dr Henderson noticed something unusual in the lake after the crash. Janet's attempt to kill her husband has trapped them both, although George plans simply to run away. Janet tricks George into poisoning himself. As he dies, Dr Henderson arrives and says he knew all along that George was an imposter; the real Mr Preston had stopped by his house in the fog the night he arrived. Janet faints, and Dr Henderson gives her a drink from the same flask she used to trick George. When she opens her eyes and recognises the flask, she realises she has killed herself, and bursts into hysterical laughter.

== Cast ==
- Bette Davis as Janet Frobisher
- Gary Merrill as George Bates
- Emlyn Williams as Dr Henderson
- Anthony Steel as Larry Stevens
- Barbara Murray as Chris Dale
- Reginald Beckwith as Mr Bigley
- Edna Morris as Mrs Bunting

== Production ==
Val Guest said Barbara Stanwyck was envisioned in the lead role and was going to play it; however, she then discovered her husband Robert Taylor had been unfaithful making Quo Vadis and did not want to make the film.

In November 1950, producer Dan Angel announced Gloria Swanson would play the lead. However, Swanson later dropped out; she said this was because she had received an offer to perform Twentieth Century on Broadway.

In March 1951, Bette Davis and Gary Merrill became attached to the project with Merrill replacing Leo Genn who had been cast. Merrill wrote in his memoirs that neither he nor Davis had particularly liked the script, but were attracted by the chance to work together in England, and by a large fee; Davis was also pleased by the fact the cast would include Emlyn Williams, who wrote the original play on which Davis' film The Corn Is Green (1945) was based.

This was the second on-screen pairing of then-married couple Davis and Gary Merrill, following All About Eve (1950). They made Phone Call from a Stranger (1952) the following year. Rapper, who was selected by Davis to helm the film, had directed her in Now, Voyager (1942) ten years earlier.

Filming went from April to June 1951. Exteriors of the United Artists release were filmed on location in Malham, West Riding of Yorkshire (now in North Yorkshire), and interiors were shot at the Nettlefold Studios in Walton-on-Thames in Surrey. The film's sets were designed by the art director Cedric Dawe. Davis was reportedly insecure and unhappy during filming. She called Steel "a beautiful prop".

Of the project, star Bette Davis recalled "We had nothing but script trouble. Gary (Merrill) and I often wondered why we agreed to make this film after we got started working on it. Emlyn (Williams) rewrote many scenes for us, which gave it some plausibility, but we never cured the basic ills of the story."

According to Merrill, "the basic premise" of the film "was pretty crummy to begin with. But Bette believed that with Emlyn's help the script could be improved. So the two of them went to work, altering this and that. When this happened I usually found a place to lie down, being my lazy self, to wait for the action to begin. The fact I wasn't doing anything bugged the hell out of Bette."

== Critical reception ==
Variety wrote: "With this small and select cast, there is little margin for error. Bette Davis does her standard first-class job as the writer, playing the unsympathetic role with her known facility. Gary Merrill, as her assumed husband, turns in an impressive performance, being strong without being domineering, tough without being brutal. Emlyn Williams, a little more suave than usual, plays a neighbor vet who knows there is something wrong and whose nosiness exposes the masquerade. Anthony Steel and Barbara Murray are a good romantic team, while Reginald Beckwith and Edna Morris fill the two minor roles with polish."

The New York Times described the film as "a garrulous but occasionally interesting excursion into murder and unrequited love ... the script ... is basically a static affair that rarely escapes from its sets or the scenarist's verbosity. Suspense is only fitfully generated and then quickly dissipated ...Gary Merrill contributes a thoroughly seasoned and convincing portrayal ... Emlyn Williams adds a professionally polished characterization ... and Anthony Steel and Barbara Murray are adequate ... However, Another Man's Poison is strictly Bette Davis' meat. She is permitted a wide latitude of histrionics in delineating the designing neurotic who is as flinty a killer as any we've seen in the recent past."

In his review in New Statesman and Nation, Frank Hauser wrote "No one has ever accused Bette Davis of failing to rise to a good script; what this film shows is how far she can go to meet a bad one."

== Notes ==
- Higham, Charles (1981). Bette : the life of Bette Davis. Macmillan.
- Merrill, Gary (1988). Bette, Rita, and the rest of my life. L. Tapley. ISBN 978-0-912769-13-4.
