= Ursula Howells =

English actress (1922–2005)

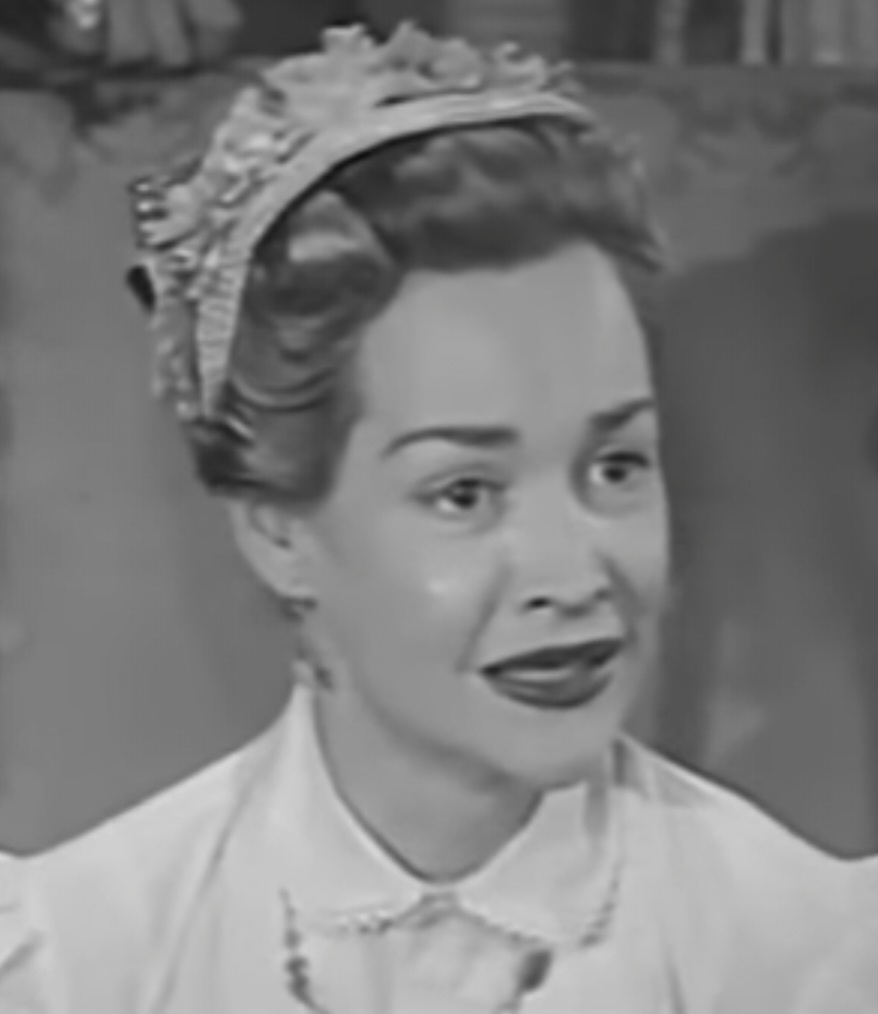
- Howells in an episode of Sherlock Holmes (1954)
- Born: 17 September 1922; London, England
- Died: 16 October 2005 (aged 83); London, England
- Occupation: Actress
- Years active: 1939–2005
- Spouse: Anthony Pelissier (m. 1968; died 1988)

Ursula Howells (17 September 1922 – 16 October 2005) was an English actress whose elegant presence kept her much in demand for roles in film and television.

== Life and career ==
Howells was born in London, the daughter of composer Herbert Howells, and was educated at St Paul's Girls' School, where her father worked as Director of Music. She made her first stage appearance at Dundee in 1939, in John Drinkwater's Bird in Hand, then moved to Oxford in 1942 and three years later made her London debut at the Embassy Theatre, Swiss Cottage. In 1947, she appeared in the comedy Jane at the Aldwych Theatre. After several years in the West End, and a brief stint on Broadway where she appeared in Springtime for Henry in 1951, she began to appear in films.

After the death of her father in 1983, Ursula Howells instigated the Herbert Howells Society in 1987, and became a standard-bearer for the promotion of his work. She financially supported the recording of his compositions and did much to encourage the publishing and promotion of church music.

Howells died on 16 October 2005, aged 83.

== Filmography ==
=== Film ===
- Flesh and Blood (1951) - Harriet Marshall
- I Believe in You (1952) - Hon. Ursula
- The Oracle (1953) - Peggy
- The Weak and the Wicked (1954) - Pam Vickers
- The Gilded Cage (1955) - Brenda Lucas
- The Constant Husband (1955) - 'The Wives' - Ann
- Track the Man Down (1955) - Mary Dennis
- They Can't Hang Me (1955) - Antonia Pitt
- Handcuffs, London (1955) - Madelaine Perry
- Keep It Clean (1956) - Pat Anstey
- The Long Arm (1956) - Mrs. Elliot / Mrs. Gilson
- West of Suez (1957) - Eileen
- Account Rendered (1957) - Lucille Ainsworth
- Two Letter Alibi (1962) - Louise Hilary
- 80,000 Suspects (1963) - Joanna Duten
- The Sicilians (1964) - Mme. Perrault
- Dr Terror's House of Horrors (1965) - Mrs. Deirdre Biddulph (segment "Werewolf")
- Torture Garden (1967) - Miss Maxine Chambers (segment 3 "Mr. Steinway")
- Assignment K (1968) - Estelle
- Crossplot (1969) - Maggi Thwaites
- Mumsy, Nanny, Sonny and Girly (1970) - Mumsy
- Father, Dear Father (1973) - Barbara
- The Tichborne Claimant (1998) - Lady Doughty

== Television ==
- Madhouse on Castle Street (1963) - Martha Tompkins
- Dixon of Dock Green (1963) - Jean Baker Ellis
- The Forsyte Saga (1967) - Frances
- Man in a Suitcase (1968) - Clara Arnoldson
- Father, Dear Father (1968–1973) - Barbara Mossman
- Upstairs, Downstairs (1975) - Duchess of Buckminster
- Crown Court (TV series) (1977) - Audrey Taylor ('Safe as Houses' episode)
- The Barchester Chronicles (1982) - Miss Thorne
- Miss Marple - A Murder is Announced (1985) - Miss Blacklock
- Bergerac (1985–1991) - Laura Atherton / Elizabeth Fouchet
- Casualty (1993–1997) - Erica Chisnall / Hilda
- Lovejoy (1994) - Olive Nettleton
- Under the Hammer (1994) - Mrs. Roper
- Heartbeat (1995) - Miriam Wakefield
- Dangerfield (1995) - Violet Trevelyn
- A Rather English Marriage (1998, TV Movie) - Mary
- The Cazalets (2001) - Kitty Cazalet
- Midsomer Murders- The Electric Vendetta (2001) - Lady Isabel Aubrey (final appearance)
