= Tarzan and the Lost Safari =

1957 film by H. Bruce Humberstone

- Tarzan and the Lost Safari movie poster
- Directed by: Bruce Humberstone
- Written by: Montgomery Pittman; Lillie Hayward
- Based on: Characters created by Edgar Rice Burroughs
- Produced by: John Croydon; Sol Lesser
- Starring: Gordon Scott; Robert Beatty; Yolande Donlan; Betta St. John
- Cinematography: C. M. Pennington-Richards
- Edited by: Bill Lewthwaite
- Music by: Clifton Parker
- Color process: Eastmancolor
- Production company: Sol Lesser/Solar Films
- Distributed by: Metro-Goldwyn-Mayer
- Release date: April 12, 1957
- Running time: 86 min.
- Country: United States
- Language: English
- Budget: $2,315,000

Tarzan and the Lost Safari is a 1957 action adventure film featuring Edgar Rice Burroughs' famous jungle hero Tarzan and starring Gordon Scott, Robert Beatty, Yolande Donlan and Betta St. John. Directed by H. Bruce Humberstone, it was the first Tarzan film released in color, Eastman Color. The nineteenth film of the Tarzan film series that began with 1932's Tarzan the Ape Man and the first produced by MGM since 1942, it was filmed in Nairobi, British East Africa. The character of Jane does not appear in this motion picture. Released April 12, 1957, it was followed by Tarzan and the Trappers in 1958.

== Plot ==
An airplane crashes in the jungle of the Kenya Colony of British East Africa in 1956, stranding passengers Gamage Dean (Yolande Donlan), Diana Penrod (Betta St. John), "Doodles" Fletcher (Wilfrid Hyde-White), Carl Kraski (George Coulouris), and Dick Penrod (Peter Arne). Before the plane slides into a gorge the group is rescued by Tarzan (Gordon Scott), who undertakes to lead them back to civilization.

Diana is kidnapped by warriors from Opar under Chief Ogonooro (Orlando Martins). The Oparians desire the strangers as sacrifices for their lion god. She is recovered by Tarzan and hunter Tusker Hawkins (Robert Beatty), whose advances Diana rebuffs. Secretly, however, Hawkins is in league with the Oparians, and plans to sell the castaways to the natives for a fortune in ivory.

Tarzan, rightly suspecting Hawkins' untrustworthiness, exposes his treachery. Now openly in league with the natives, the hunter helps them take the white party captive in Tarzan's absence. The ape man returns to save them before the sacrifice can take place, aided by his chimpanzee ally Cheeta, who sets fire to the native village. He then leads them to the safety of a nearby settlement.

Hawkins meets his fate at the hands of the Oparians, to whom Tarzan has signaled the villain's double-dealing by a creative use of jungle drums.

== Cast ==
- Gordon Scott as Tarzan
- Robert Beatty as Tusker Hawkins
- Yolande Donlan as Gamage Dean
- Betta St. John as Diana Penrod
- Wilfrid Hyde-White as 'Doodles' Fletcher (as Wilfrid Hyde White)
- George Coulouris as Carl Kraski
- Peter Arne as Dick Penrod
- Orlando Martins as Oparian Chieftain Ogonoore

== Notes ==
The film contains more allusions to the Burroughs novels than usual for a Tarzan movie of the period, including the ape man's brief account of his origin to the female lead (which echoes Burroughs' version, however the she-ape who raised him is incorrectly identified as “Kerchak”). The film also uses Opar, though reducing the grand lost city as described by Burroughs to a generic native village. A male lion seen resting with Tarzan near the start of the film is referred to as “Numa”, a term used for male lions in the Burroughs series. Tarzan, while retaining his then-customary film characterization as an inarticulate simpleton, nevertheless displays considerable shrewdness and resource, foreshadowing the restoration in later movies of Burroughs' original concept of an intelligent, multitalented ape man.

The film earned $915,000 in the US and Canada and $1.4 million elsewhere, making MGM a profit of $432,000.

== Critical reception ==
A review of the film in Variety reported that "Tarzan takes to authentic jungle backgrounds, and the antics come off entertainingly," that the "combination of African footage lensed in Technicolour [...] and the matching studio-staged sequences [...] adds excellent sight values to go with the standard adventuring," and "Gordon Scott has the physique for the title role and does acceptably by it." The film's review in The New York Times noted Scott's "awesome physique [with] the two women in this story about the survivors of a plane crash in the jungle remain[ing] frankly wide-eyed throughout," but that "Tarzan's present keepers have taken the flamboyance out of his character. He takes to the trees only reluctantly and whoops it up with that yodel of his only once or twice."

== Novelization ==
In conjunction with the film, Whitman Publishing Company released a hardbound novelization of the screenplay intended for younger readers. While issued without credit, its authorship is generally attributed to Frank Castle.

== See also ==
- List of American films of 1957
