= They Can't Hang Me =

1955 British film by Val Guest

- Original British quad poster
- Directed by: Val Guest
- Written by: Val Guest; Val Valentine
- Based on: novel by Leonard Mosley
- Produced by: Roger Proudlock
- Starring: Terence Morgan; Yolande Donlan; André Morell; Ursula Howells
- Cinematography: Stanley Pavey
- Edited by: Douglas Myers
- Music by: Stanley Black
- Production company: Vandyke Productions
- Distributed by: Independent Film Distributors
- Release date: October 1955
- Running time: 75 minutes
- Country: United Kingdom
- Language: English

They Can't Hang Me is a 1955 British drama film directed by Val Guest and starring Terence Morgan, Yolande Donlan and Anthony Oliver. It was written by Guest and Val Valentine based on the 1955 novel of the same title by Leonard Mosley.

== Plot ==
A senior civil servant, Pitt has been convicted of a murder and sentenced to death. Days before his execution, Pitt reveals that he has been passing on top secret information to an agent of a foreign power and offers to reveal the identity of his handler in exchange for a reprieve. With only five days before Pitt's execution, debonair Special Branch Inspector Ralph Brown takes on the task of identifying the spy before he flees the country.

== Cast ==
- Terence Morgan as Inspector Ralph Brown
- Yolande Donlan as Jill Wilson
- Anthony Oliver as Inspector Newcombe
- André Morell as Robert Isaac Pitt
- Reginald Beckwith as Harold
- Ursula Howells as Antonia Pitt
- Guido Lorraine as Pietr Revski
- Basil Dignam as Wing Commander Riddle
- John Horsley as Assistant Commissioner
- Mark Dignam as Prison Governor
- Raymond Rollett as Sir Robert Rosper
- Fred Johnson as Professor Robinson-Heston
- Arnold Marlé as Professor Karl Kopek
- Barry Lowe as Private Eric Colter
- Richard Cuthbert as Judge
- Diana Lambert as young woman

== Production ==
It was shot at Shepperton Studios near London. The film's sets were designed by the art director Joseph Bato.

Guest said "the Proudlock Brothers had bought the book, Roger Proudlock and his brother, and had got themselves into terrible trouble one way or another, financially or the director they had had pulled out of they’d fired [them], something had gone wrong, and I know they called me in a panic and said “Will you take this over?” So I looked at it and I didn’t like the script so they let me redo the script, and we took over at very short notice. It was not one of those that I had sat down and said I must make." The film uses Sidney Torch's music for The Black Museum for its title and some of its incidental music.

The starring role of Brown was an unusual part for Morgan, who was better known for playing villains.

== Critical reception ==
The Monthly Film Bulletin wrote: "Spy thriller with an involved, though fairly coherent, plot, hinging on the necessity to save a desperate situation within a limited period of time. With the exception of Pitt, who is convincingly played by Andre Morell, the characters are essentially subordinate to the action. Tension is sustained, and Val Guest directs with slick confidence from a laconic script."

Radio Times calls the film "a minor Cold War thriller", adding, "(Val) Guest puts a neat (if downbeat) spin on events," and concluding, "the back-up cast is as solid as a rock, with Guest's wife Yolande Donlan putting in an effective appearance".

TV Guide describes it as "slightly more interesting than the normal run of British spy films, thanks to an unusually intelligent script."
