= Hy Hazell =

English film actress (1921–1970)

- Hazell in Up in the World (1956)
- Born: Hyacinth Hazel O'Higgins; 4 October 1921 (Note: A majority of sources give 1919 as her year of birth, although the British Film Institute cites 1920 and The Oxford Reference cites 1922.); Streatham, London, England
- Died: 10 May 1970 (aged 48); London, England
- Occupations: Stage and screen actress, singer
- Spouse: Edward Adam Primrose Jenkins

Hyacinth Hazel O'Higgins (4 October 1921 – 10 May 1970), stage name Hy Hazell, was a British actress of theatre, musicals and revue as well as a contralto singer and film actress. AllMusic described her as "an exuberant comic actor and lively singer and dancer". A pretty brunette, with long legs, she was billed as Britain's answer to Betty Grable.

== Early life ==
Hazell was born in Streatham in south London on 4 October 1921.

== Career ==
As a teenager, Hazell started life as a performer in the chorus of the West End production of Rodgers and Hart's On Your Toes (1937). She later had a long and successful run of leading roles in musicals, including Expresso Bongo at the Saville Theatre in 1958, as the heartless Dixie Collins; as Mrs Squeezum in the Mermaid Theatre's Lock Up Your Daughters in 1959 (playing for almost 2,000 performances); as ex-Cochran girl Kay Connor in Charlie Girl at the Adelphi Theatre from 1965; and as Mrs Peachum in a notable Beggar's Opera by the Prospect Theatre Company in 1968.

Her appearances also include:

- A Talent to Amuse; 1969 – 1970, Phoenix Theatre, London.
- Miss Miniver, Ann Veronica; 17 April – May 1969, Cambridge Theatre, London.
- The Beggar's Opera; 1968 – 1969, Apollo Theatre (Shaftesbury Avenue), London.
- The Confederacy; 19 – 24 October 1964, Cambridge Arts Theatre.
- Mollie Plummer, No Strings; 30 December 1963 – March 1964, Her Majesty’s Theatre, London.
- Dixie Collins, Expresso Bongo; opened 31 March 1958, Alexandra Theatre, Birmingham and Saville Theatre, London.
- Esmeralda Leigh, Dead On Nine; opened 24 August 1955, Westminster Theatre, London.
- Anne Etherton, Ten Men And A Miss; 18 June – 13 October 1951, Aldwych Theatre, London and Opera House, Manchester.

=== Films ===
Hazell appeared in British films such as Meet Me at Dawn (1946), The Yellow Balloon (1953), and B-movies like The Body Said No! and The Lady Craved Excitement (both 1950), the latter part allowing her to sing. Within the British tradition of having glamorous young women play the principal boy in pantos, she became a favourite. Hazell established a reputation as "English pantomime's most distinguished post war principal boy". For years she was extremely popular in this seasonal form of theatre.

== Personal life ==
Hazell's given named of Hyacinth was abbreviated to "Hy" by Nigel Patrick when they were in Italy during World War II entertaining troops.

She married Edward Adam Primrose Jenkins, land agent to the Duke of Marlborough, in 1950; he died in June 1960 at the age of 50.

In the summer of 1969, Hazell began playing Golde in Fiddler on the Roof in London's West End. On 10 May 1970, a Sunday when there was no performance, she died accidentally by choking to death whilst eating a steak at a friend's house. An inquest found that her blood showed a very high alcohol level: "A high enough level to account for some carelessness about eating and possibly the swallowing of food and therefore to have been almost a certain reason for her choking."

== Selected filmography ==
- The Dummy Talks (1943) (credited as Derna Hazell)
- Meet Me at Dawn (1947)
- Just William's Luck (1947)
- Paper Orchid (1949)
- Celia (1949)
- The Lady Craved Excitement (1950)
- The Body Said No! (1950)
- The Franchise Affair (1951)
- The Night Won't Talk (1952)
- The Yellow Balloon (1953)
- Forces' Sweetheart (1953)
- Stolen Assignment (1955)
- Up in the World (1956)
- The Mail Van Murder (Scotland Yard film series) (1957)
- The Key Man (1957)
- The Whole Truth (1958)
- Trouble with Eve (1960)
- Five Golden Hours (1961)
- What Every Woman Wants (1962)
- Every Home Should Have One (1970)
