= Anthony Oliver =

British actor (1922–1995)

- Portrait by Vivienne, c. 1955
- Born: 4 July 1922; Abersychan, Monmouthshire, Wales
- Died: November 1995 (aged 73); London, England
- Occupation: Actor
- Years active: 1947–1972

Anthony Oliver (4 July 1922 – November 1995) was a Welsh film, television and stage actor.

== Selected filmography ==
- Once a Jolly Swagman (1949) – Derek
- All Over the Town (1949) – P.C. Butt
- A Run for Your Money (1949) – Miner (uncredited)
- Waterfront (1950) – Prison Warder (uncredited)
- The Magnet (1950) – Policeman
- The Clouded Yellow (1950) – Detective (uncredited)
- The Happy Family (1952) – Fireman
- Emergency Call (1952) – Police Constable
- Gift Horse (1952) – Ship's Officer, Guns
- Penny Princess (1952) – Selby's Valet (uncredited)
- Cosh Boy (1953) – Doctor (uncredited)
- Street Corner (1953) – Stanley Foster
- The Runaway Bus (1954) – Duty Officer
- Shetlandsgjengen (1954) – Narrator (voice)
- To Dorothy a Son (1954) – Express Reporter
- Mad About Men (1954) – Pawnbroker
- To Dorothy a Son (1954) – Pawnbroker
- They Can't Hang Me (1955) – Inspector Newcombe
- Lost (1956) – Sgt. Lyel
- Eyewitness (1956) – Podge
- Checkpoint (1956) – Michael
- Sink the Bismarck! (1960) – Operations Officer on HMS Ark Royal (uncredited)
- The Nudist Story (1960) – Stephen Blake
- The Entertainer (1960) – Interviewer
- Crossroads to Crime (1960) – Don Ross
- Transatlantic (1960) – Wentworth
- H.M.S. Defiant (1962) – Tavern Leader
- Out of the Fog (1962) – Chaplain
- Danger by My Side (1962) – Det. Insp. Willoughby
