= Seven Nights in Japan =

1970 film by Lewis Gilbert

- Original British Quad poster
- Directed by: Lewis Gilbert
- Written by: Christopher Wood
- Produced by: Lewis Gilbert
- Starring: Michael York; Hidemi Aoki
- Cinematography: Henri Decaë
- Edited by: John Glen
- Music by: David Hentschel
- Production company: EMI Films
- Distributed by: EMI (UK); Paramount Pictures (USA)
- Release date: 16 September 1976 (UK)
- Running time: 104 minutes
- Countries: France; United Kingdom
- Language: English

Seven Nights in Japan (also known as 7 Nights in Japan) is a 1976 British-French drama film directed by Lewis Gilbert and starring Michael York, Charles Gray and Hidemi Aoki. It was written by Christopher Wood. Gilbert called the film "a bit daft really... pretty flimsy... a very minor piece of work."

== Premise ==
Prince George is travelling in Japan for the first time, spending a week there. While there, he meets and falls for a local girl, Sumi, who is a bus tour guide. They spend a few days and nights together at her isolated childhood home. When Sumi discovers his true identity, she admonishes him for avoiding his duties as the future king – he had absconded from his planned itinerary of factory visits to be with her; he later justifies his absence to ambassador Henry Hollander by asserting that he was simply taking his allotted naval shore leave. He is hunted by an unknown Japanese sect who want him dead, because he left one of their nightclubs without paying, having inadvertently run up a huge bill.

== Cast ==
- Michael York as Prince George
- Hidemi Aoki as Sumi
- James Villiers as Finn
- Peter Jones as Captain Balcon
- Charles Gray as Henry Hollander
- Anne Lonnberg as Jane Hollander
- Eléonore Hirt as Blanche Hollander
- Lionel Murton as American Tourist
- Yolande Donlan as American Wife

== Production ==
When Lewis Gilbert was making The Adventurers (1970) for Paramount, he said Charles Bluhdorn, whose company Gulf and Western Industries owned the studio, wanted Gilbert to make a musical remake of Roman Holiday with songs by the Sherman Brothers. Gilbert agreed but said Paramount then got "cold feet" and the film was cancelled.

Gilbert revisited the idea in the mid-1970s. He wanted to go back to Japan, where he had enjoyed making You Only Live Twice and came up with the idea of a twist on Roman Holiday with the roles reversed: a romance between a royal man and common woman. The lead male, Prince George (Michael York) was inspired by Prince Charles, who was serving in the Royal Navy at the time and was known for his romantic involvements as well as his need for a suitable wife. In the film, Prince George is said to be engaged to Princess Margarita, a member of the Swedish royal family. "There are echos of Roman Holiday," said York. In July 1975, Nat Cohen announced the movie would be part of a slate of eleven movies from EMI Films worth £6 million. Filming started in September 1975. Gilbert says they had to teach Hidemi Aoki English.

== Reception ==
Conservative MP John Stokes called the film "a deliberate attempt to make fun of and discredit Prince Charles", accusing it of being based on Prince Charles' 1970 visit to Japan. This was denied by EMI Films. Michael York wrote in his memoir Accidentally on Purpose that Prince Charles "while not confessing the same irresponsible wish-fulfillment as George, confided that our portrayal of the rigors that face a modern prince was, in some respects, accurate. It was certainly not my intention to reflect unflatteringly on a man I admired."

=== Critical ===
The Monthly Film Bulletin wrote: "Despite several winning ingredients – Michael York's ineffably clean-cut performance as the Prince and a commercial gloss most notable for Henri Decaé's arresting rural compositions – Seven Nights in Japan never does much to overcome the worst conventions of royal hokum. The fault lies mainly with Lewis Gilbert's attenuation of an underdeveloped script, which fails to tie up its farcical threads or to explore the potentially intriguing tensions of its crosscultural romance. ... The movie's lethargic pace is compounded by a number of self-consciously fussy camera set-ups, and its sentimental tone sealed by the unfortunate songs in English and Japanese foisted on bland newcomer Hidemi Aoki."

Variety wrote: "Seven Nights in Japan is a beautifully-photographed pastiche bearing little true resemblance to the enigmatic life of bustling Tokyo, where it was lensed. Producer-director Lewis Gilbert has carefully stripped away the coarse fabric which enmeshes any large city and lays bare a delicate situation made credible only by diffused lighting and the inevitability of Christopher Wood's screenplay. ... Charles Gray is well cast as the Ambassador and Eleonore Hirt as his prissy wife. York's acting is suitably princelike although never exceptional while Hidemi Aoki has occasional moments in her first English-speaking role. James Villiers as the pompous ship's officer is wasted in a part which gives him little scope for his not inconsiderable comedy talents."

The Evening Standard called it "a very old fashioned film." FilmInk wrote: "No one liked Seven Nights in Japan: Roman Holiday needs gold-plated stars to work and Michael York and Hidemi Aoki were not that."

=== Box office ===
Gilbert said the film "didn't do anything" commercially and was "hated" in Japan in part because he showed traditional Japan. "We didn't know they hated the idea of Japanese girls going off with foreigners," said Gilbert. According to York, however, the film was a big success in Burma, leading to York being mobbed when he visited.
