= You're Only Young Twice (film) =

1952 British film by Terry Bishop

- Directed by: Terry Bishop
- Written by: Reginald Beckwith; Terry Bishop; Lindsay Galloway
- Based on: What Say They? by James Bridie
- Produced by: John Baxter; Barbara K. Emary
- Starring: Duncan Macrae; Joseph Tomelty; Patrick Barr; Charles Hawtrey; Diane Hart
- Cinematography: Jo Jago
- Edited by: Bernard Gribble
- Music by: Cedric Thorpe Davie
- Production company: Group 3 Films
- Distributed by: Associated British-Pathé (UK)
- Release date: July 1952 (UK)
- Running time: 81 minutes
- Country: United Kingdom
- Language: English

You're Only Young Twice is a 1952 British second feature ('B') comedy film directed by Terry Bishop and starring Duncan Macrae, Joseph Tomelty, Patrick Barr, Charles Hawtrey and Diane Hart. It was written by Reginald Beckwith, Bishop and Lindsay Galloway based on the 1939 play What Say They? by James Bridie.

== Premise ==
A young woman visiting a Scottish university in search of her uncle, who is in hiding from the authorities, is mistaken for the principal's secretary, so she pursues the impersonation.

== Cast ==
- Duncan Macrae as Professor Hayman
- Joseph Tomelty as Dan McEntee / Connell O'Grady (writer)
- Patrick Barr as Sir Archibald Asher
- Charles Hawtrey as Adolphus Hayman, President of Temperance Society
- Diane Hart as Ada Shore / posing as "Miss Lamplighter" (pending new principal's secretary)
- Robert Urquhart as Sheltie
- Edward Lexy as Lord Carshennie
- Roddy McMillan as Mr Milligan, President of Students' Union Council
- Jacqueline Mackenzie as Nellie
- Eric Woodburn as the Bedellus
- Molly Urquhart as Lady Duffy
- Ronnie Corbett as Freddie Mather, President of the Men's Union
- Reginald Beckwith as BBC Commentator
- Arthur Hill as Mystery Man (uncredited)

== Production ==
The film was produced by the government backed Group 3 Films and shot at Southall Studios with sets designed by the art director Ray Simm. John Grierson, head of Group 3, thought it had "some of the fastest and best dialogue in a generation."

== Critical reception ==
The Monthly Film Bulletin wrote: "This is an involved and fantastic comedy, in which many of the participants' motives remain obscure. The total impression is mainly one of great noise and confusion, though one can see what the makers were aiming at: an irresponsible, lunatic kind of entertainment, perhaps a Scots equivalent of Pierre Prevert. There are some entertaining scenes – the arrival of the Rector, most of the episodes involving Adolphus, brilliantly played by Charles Hawtrey – and the anarchistic spirit of the whole is appealing. But You're Only Young Twice! is the kind of joke that needs altogether more discipline in writing and direction."

Kine Weekly wrote: "Warm and agreeable academic romp ... Its story, telling of goings-on behind the scenes of a Scottish university, is untidy, but the characters, which have colour and individuality, are neatly manipulated, and the dialogue has quite an edge. Atmosphere and detail, too, are effective. A pleasant change from raucous American collegiate comedy, it should register with the majority of picturegoers." Leslie Halliwell said: "Misfire eccentric comedy which deserves marks for trying but fails to amuse."

In British Sound Films: The Studio Years 1928–1959 David Quinlan rated the film as "mediocre", writing: "Too foolish for words, this comedy fell between all sorts of stools."

The Radio Times has described it as a "theatrical comedy," which was "shakily brought to the screen ... the story involves mistaken identity, Celtic poetry, horse racing and the rigging of Rectorial elections. Blink and you'll miss Ronnie Corbett in what, of course, can only be described as a small role."
