= Boyd's Shop =

- U.S. National Register of Historic Places
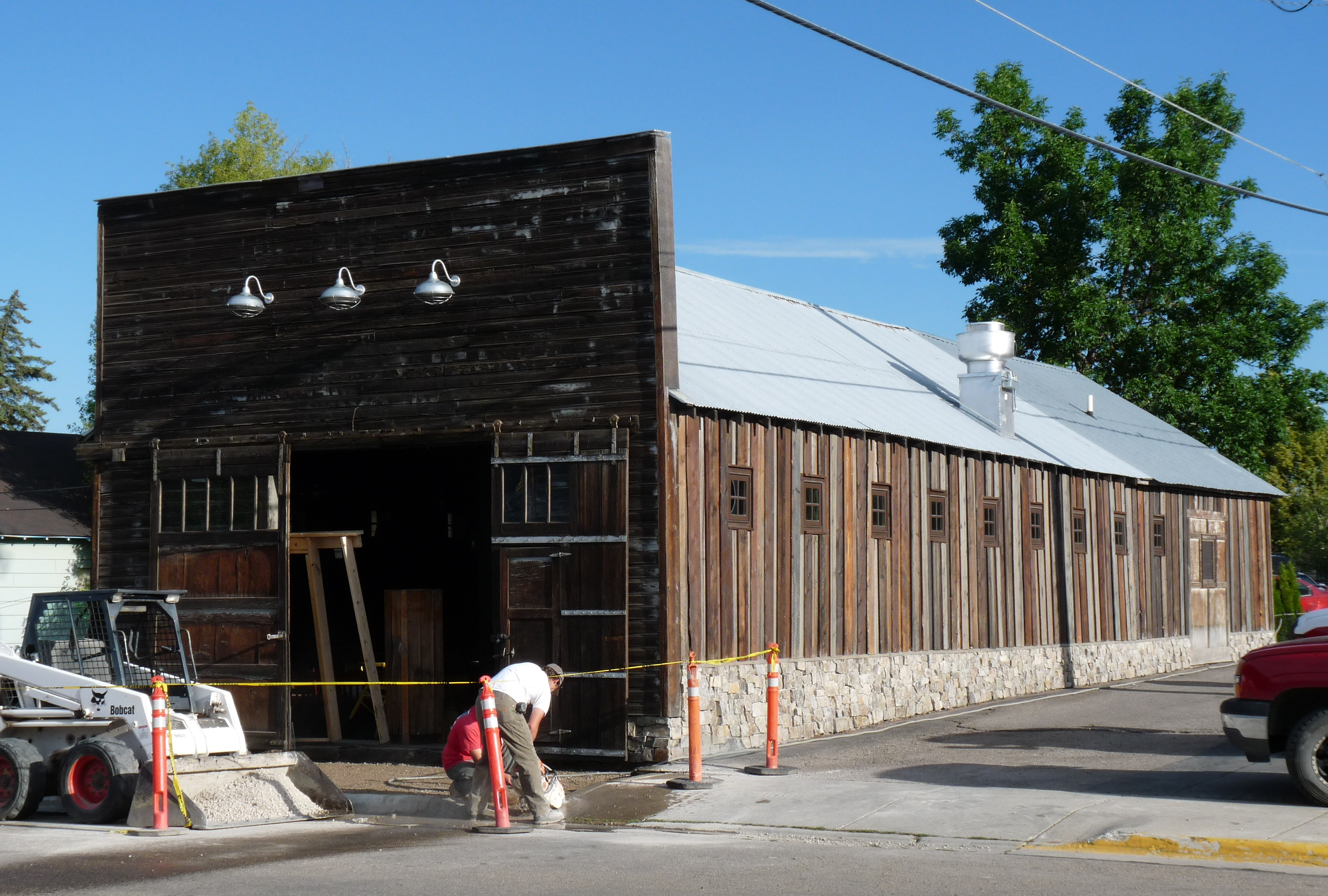

- Location within Montana Location within the United States
- Location: 227 First St. W., Kalispell, Montana
- Coordinates: 48°11′50″N 114°18′58″W
- Area: less than one acre
- Built: c.1910-15
- Architectural style: Western false front
- MPS: Kalispell MPS
- NRHP reference No.: 94000874
- Added to NRHP: August 24, 1994

Boyd's Shop, at 227 First Street West in Kalispell, Montana, was built around 1910 to 1915. It was listed on the National Register of Historic Places in 1994.

It was established as a blacksmith shop, and was later shifted to welding.

It has Western false front architecture.

The site was part of Kalispell's Chinatown in the 1890s. A steam laundry plus a Chinese laundry and dwellings were on the lot in 1892; all buildings on the lot were burned or demolished before 1910.
