= The Day the Earth Caught Fire =

1961 British film by Val Guest

- Theatrical release poster
- Directed by: Val Guest
- Written by: Wolf Mankowitz; Val Guest
- Produced by: Val Guest; Frank Sherwin Green
- Starring: Janet Munro; Leo McKern; Edward Judd
- Cinematography: Harry Waxman
- Edited by: Bill Lenny
- Music by: Stanley Black; Monty Norman
- Production companies: Val Guest Productions; Pax Films
- Distributed by: British Lion Films
- Release date: 23 November 1961 (London)
- Running time: 98 minutes
- Country: United Kingdom
- Budget: £190,000 or £213,581

The Day the Earth Caught Fire is a 1961 British science-fiction disaster film directed by Val Guest and starring Edward Judd, Leo McKern, and Janet Munro. It is one of the classic apocalyptic films of its era. The film opened at the Odeon Marble Arch in London on 23 November 1961. In August 2014, a restored version was screened at the British Museum's summer open-air cinema.

The film, which was partly made on location in London and Brighton, used matte painting to create images of abandoned cities and desolate landscapes. The production also featured the real Daily Express, even using the paper's own headquarters, the Daily Express Building in Fleet Street, and featuring Arthur Christiansen as the Express editor, a job he had held in real life.

== Plot ==
Edward Judd walks through a devastated and deserted London in the film's orange-infused opening sequence.

A lone man walks through the deserted streets of an abandoned, sweltering London. The film then goes back several months. Peter Stenning had been an up-and-coming journalist with the Daily Express, but since a divorce threw his life into disarray, he has been drinking too much, and his work has suffered. His editor has begun giving him lousy assignments. Stenning's only friend, Bill Maguire, is a veteran Fleet Street reporter, who offers him encouragement and occasionally covers for him by writing his copy.

Meanwhile, after the Soviet Union and the United States simultaneously conduct nuclear bomb tests, strange meteorological events begin to affect the globe. Stenning is sent to the British Met Office to obtain temperature data, and while there, he meets Jeannie, a young typist who is temporarily acting as telephonist. They "meet cute", trading insults; later, they fall in love.

Stenning discovers that the nuclear tests have had dramatic effects on the Earth. He asks Jeannie to help him get any relevant information. It becomes apparent that Earth's nutation has been altered, while its axial tilt has increased by 11 degrees, affecting the climatic zones. Rising temperatures cause water to evaporate and mist to envelop Britain, and a solar eclipse occurs days ahead of calculations. Later, characters realise that the orbit of the Earth has been disrupted, and the planet is spiralling towards the Sun.

The government imposes a state of emergency and starts rationing water and supplies. People start evacuating the cities. Scientists conclude that the only way to prevent the Earth's destruction is to detonate a series of nuclear bombs in western Siberia, stabilising the planet's orbit. Stenning, Maguire, and Jeanie gather at a bar to listen to the radio broadcast of the event. The bombs are detonated, and the distant shock wave causes dust to fall from the bar's ceiling.

At the newspaper print room, two versions of the front page have been prepared; one reads "World Saved", the other "World Doomed". The film ends with a voiceover from Stenning without expressly revealing whether the Earth is saved:

"So Man has sown the wind – and reaped the whirlwind. Perhaps in the next few hours, there will be no remembrance of the past, and no hope for the future that might have been. All the works of Man will be consumed in the great fire out of which he was created. But perhaps at the heart of the burning light into which he has thrust his world, there is a heart that cares more for him, than he has ever cared for himself. And if there is a future for Man – insensitive as he is, proud and defiant in his pursuit of power - let him resolve to live it lovingly; for he knows well how to do so. Then he may say once more: Truly the light is sweet; and what a pleasant thing it is for the eyes to see the Sun."

=== Alternative ending ===
In the final scenes, the release for the American market adds church bells, which were absent in the British version. In his commentary track for the 2001 Anchor Bay DVD release, director Val Guest said the sound of church bells in the American version had been added by distributor Universal, to suggest that the emergency detonation had succeeded and Earth had been saved. Guest speculated that the bells motif had been inspired by the film The War of the Worlds (1953), which ends with the joyous ringing of church bells after the emergency (and a nuclear explosion), but Guest maintained his intention was to always have an ambiguous ending.

== Cast ==
- Edward Judd as Peter Stenning
- Leo McKern as Bill Maguire
- Janet Munro as Jeannie Craig
- Michael Goodliffe as "Jacko", The Night Editor
- Bernard Braden as Dave, The News Editor
- Reginald Beckwith as Harry
- Gene Anderson as May
- Renée Asherson as Angela
- Arthur Christiansen as Jeff Jefferson, The Editor
- Austin Trevor as Sir John Kelly
- Edward Underdown as Dick Sanderson
- Ian Ellis as Michael Stenning
- Peter Butterworth as Second Sub-Editor (uncredited)
- Pamela Green as Shower Steward (uncredited)
- Michael Caine as Police Constable (uncredited)
- Norman Chappell as Hotel Receptionist (uncredited)

== Production ==
=== Development ===
Val Guest said the film was based on a 20-page treatment.

The only politics in it were to say the only war that mankind couldn't fight was God, was the elements and the only way to defeat that was if mankind got together to fight a common enemy, the elements. That was what we'd done to the elements, the [atomic] bombs. So, it was probably the first anti bomb thing. It was not anti- us bomb, it was anti- the world, it was saying mankind can do this so why doesn't mankind get together and see some sense?

Guest had tried to make the film for eight years but been unable to get finance for it. "Nobody would ever let me make it," said Guest. "Everybody said no you do these other things so well... British Lion had turned it down, Minter, Rank, Columbia." The director says he was told "Nobody wants to know about the bombs. Who's going to go and see a picture about the bombs. Anyway, every time some producer said to me is there something you want to do next, I'd say "Yes, read this", and it would come back each time "Don't joke, nobody's going to want to see it"."

Guest finally got the opportunity after the success of Expresso Bongo (1959). "I went to Steven Pallos, he said alright I'll do it," said Guest. "British Lion didn't want to know at that time so they weren't going to put any money into it, so Mickey Balcon, Steven Pallos, and another guy, Max Setton started a production company called Pax." This got the money together from British sources with Guest using his profits from Expresso Bongo as collateral to persuade British Lion to invest. It was a Val Guest Production for Pax – the only film ever made for the company.

=== Casting ===
Guest cast real life Daily Express editor Arthur Christiansen in a support part and says "We had terrible trouble with him, not trouble, the poor guy could not remember a line... We finally did it almost line by line... When he realised what he'd bitten off [more than he could chew], then it was too late. And I couldn't really recast by that time." Guest adds that Christiansen helped secure co operation from press baron Lord Beaverbrook to film on Fleet Street, and provided technical advice.

Guest said Edward Judd had "his first big break, so he was edgy, he wasn't the easiest of persons, but I can see why. It was a big thing to carry, and again the guy had a sense of humour."

Janet Munro was cast after her contract with Disney ended in early 1961. Guest said "This is a complete breakout for Janet. She has to be a genuine character and not just a sexless Disney virgin."

In an early film role, an uncredited Michael Caine makes a brief appearance as a policeman manning a road block.

=== Filming ===
Filming took place at Shepperton Studios with location filming on Fleet Street. It started in May 1961.

The film was made in black and white but in some original prints, the opening and closing sequences are tinted orange-yellow to suggest the heat of the sun. It was shot with 35 mm anamorphic lenses using the SATEC Dyaliscope process. The film was shot in London and South East England. Principal photography included Fleet Street (the Daily Express building), Battersea Park, the HM Treasury Building in Westminster and on Brighton Palace Pier.

Critic Doug Cummings commented on the film's "visual flair" and notes the film's "atmospheric advantage" and use of stock footage for disasters. He went on to say that each scene has a "great degree of realism and sense of place".

== Release ==
The film made a profit of £22,500 by 1973. According to Kinematograph Weekly the film was considered a "money maker" at the British box office in 1962.

On release in the 1960s, the film was rated "X" (minimum age 16 admitted) by the British Board of Film Censors. For the 2001 DVD it was reclassified as "15" (years and over). This rating was reduced to "12" for a release from the 2014 British Film Institute.

== Reception ==
Title card from The Day the Earth Caught Fire showing the dried-up riverbed of the River Thames

The film holds an 86% rating on the review aggregate website Rotten Tomatoes.

British film critic Leslie Halliwell said: "A smart piece of science fiction told through the eyes of Fleet Street journalists and showing a sharp eye for the London scene. Rather exhaustingly talkative, but genuinely frightening at the time."

The Radio Times Guide to Films gave the film three out of five, noting the time spent with journalists rather than fancy special effects. It described the film as "tautly intelligent" and complimented a "script full of fatalistic quips and cynicism".

Filmink wrote "at times it seems that Munro’s other role in the film seems to be to demonstrate how hot it’s getting by having her constantly sun baking, hopping out of the shower and/or lying around in just a sheet – this did earn her a whole new legion of fans. But she has a real part to play, with great dialogue and dramatic scenes, and it’s a shame that she never worked with Val Guest again."

== Awards and nominations ==
Val Guest and Wolf Mankowitz received the 1962 BAFTA for Best Film Screenplay for The Day the Earth Caught Fire.

== See also ==
- List of apocalyptic films
- List of nuclear holocaust fiction
- "The Midnight Sun", an episode of The Twilight Zone with a similar premise
