= Jigsaw (1962 film) =

1962 British film by Val Guest

- Directed by: Val Guest
- Screenplay by: Val Guest
- Based on: novel Sleep Long, My Love by Hillary Waugh
- Produced by: Val Guest
- Starring: Jack Warner; Ronald Lewis; Yolande Donlan; Michael Goodliffe; John Le Mesurier
- Cinematography: Arthur Grant
- Edited by: Bill Lenny
- Color process: Black and white
- Production company: Figaro
- Distributed by: Britannia Films
- Release date: 23 August 1962 (London)
- Running time: 107 minutes
- Country: United Kingdom
- Language: English

Jigsaw is a 1962 British black and white crime film directed by Val Guest and starring Jack Warner and Ronald Lewis. The screenplay was by Guest based on the 1959 police procedural novel Sleep Long, My Love by Hillary Waugh, with the setting changed from the fictional small town of Stockford, Connecticut, (Note: The fictional Stockford is also located in a fictional part of Connecticut, 12 miles north of Stamford.) to Brighton, Sussex, while retaining the names and basic natures of its two police protagonists and most of the other characters.

== Plot ==
A woman (later explained as Joan Simpson) argues with an unseen man. She wants to marry him but he moves to attack her.

Her remains are found both dismembered and incinerated, together with a knife and a hacksaw in a small furnace in Saltdean, near Brighton. Two local detectives, following up a small but odd burglary of leases at an estate agent's office, discover the body and take on the investigation of the death. The dead woman cannot be identified but they initially think she is called Jean Sherman, since a suitcase with the initials JS had been left at the scene. The main suspect is an unidentified man who has used the false identity of John Campbell to rent the house in which the woman was found. The detectives methodically develop and follow up leads to identify both people, mostly in Brighton, but also further afield in Lewes and Greenwich.

DI Fellows goes to Jean Sherman's house and discovers that she is still alive. He tricks her into giving him a name and address to get a sample of her handwriting, which is the same as that found in the victim's house. Flashback scenes in her story specifically exclude the viewer from seeing the man John Campbell. Miss Sherman admits a one-night stand with Campbell.

They track down and arrest a suspect described by several persons as the man who occupied the house, but the case takes an unexpected turn when he admits that he was a door-to-door salesman who was with the victim but denies any involvement in her murder. His story checks out.

After the dead woman is positively identified, the veteran inspector leading the case has to tell the parents, then develops a "wild idea" about the identity of another suspect, and orders a standard procedure that confirms his theory in a non-standard fashion. This suspect (Tenby) admits knowledge of the death but his contention that it was accidental appears to be unshakeable until the detectives realise that he has lied about a crucial detail: claiming to have bought something on a Monday bank holiday, when shops would have been shut.

== Cast ==
- Jack Warner as Detective Inspector Fred Fellows
- Ronald Lewis as Detective Sergeant Jim Wilks
- Yolande Donlan as Jean Sherman
- Michael Goodliffe as Clyde Burchard
- John Le Mesurier as Mr. Simpson
- Moira Redmond as Joan Simpson
- Christine Bocca as Mrs. Simpson
- Brian Oulton as Frank Restlin
- Ray Barrett as Sergeant Gorman
- Norman Chappell as Andy Roach
- John Barron as Ray Tenby
- Joan Newell as Mrs. Banks
- Reginald Marsh as Hilders
- Timothy Bateson as Porter (uncredited)
- Geoffrey Bayldon as Constable At Murder Scene (uncredited)
- John Horsley as Superintendent Ramsey (uncredited)
- Robert Raglan as Chief Constable (uncredited)

== Production ==
Guest said "I was very keen to do Jigsaw because I liked the story enormously and thought it was very clever and very unusual, to show the police working and not getting anywhere. The awful dead ends they come up against which is what that picture shows." The film was one of his favourites. "I tried a lot of stuff out in there, which hadn't been done, the back and forward cutting in time, without having to explain it, I tried to write it so you would understand what had happened."

Guest had previously used Ronald Lewis in The Full Treatment.

It was filmed with the cooperation of the Brighton Borough Police, which was under the shadow of a major corruption scandal, and the East Sussex Constabulary. At the time of the production, Prince Philip, Duke of Edinburgh, asked the director what he was currently doing, and Guest replied that he was working on a murder mystery with the Brighton police. The Duke said that sounded "bloody boring".

== Release ==
The film opened on 23 August 1962 at the Columbia Theatre in London.

== Reception ==
Guest said the film did "reasonable business. It did enormous business on the continent. It got very good reviews."

== Critical response ==
Variety called it "excellent".

The Monthly Film Bulletin wrote: "An undeniably entertaining story-teller, Val Guest has an efficient if facile talent which is ideally suited to this kind of mechanical whodunit. The meticulous yet fascinating business of police detection, allied to well-used and sharply photographed Brighton locations, holds the interest and provides a few macabre shocks; though the constant dovetailing of scenes, by the use of a noise or gesture linking one shot to the next, is apt to become tiresome. Inevitably, Jack Warner's Inspector smacks of "Dock Green" cosiness, and what human touches the script allows itself are sprayed on with thoughtless precision, as if a character has only to refer often enough to a football match he's missing to impress on an audience that he is a credible human being with a life outside his job. However, Yolande Donlan's embittered spinster and Michael Goodliffe's shifty salesman are conceived and acted with relish."

Britmovie wrote that Jigsaw is "a chilling murder mystery," adding that, "at 107 minutes, the film is long but never tiresome".

The Guardian described the film as "one of the finest postwar British crime movies and possibly the best depiction of the seaside town on film. Caught in its seedy corruption, Brighton emerges as a far cry from the bumbling world with which (Val) Guest had until then been associated."

Leslie Halliwell said: "Absorbing and entertaining little murder mystery which sustains its considerable length with interesting detail and plays as fair as can be with the audience. Excellent unassuming entertainment."

The Radio Times Guide to Films gave the film 3/5 stars, writing: "This satisfying murder mystery benefits from the reassuring presence of Jack Warner as the detective on the case. Set in Brighton, director Val Guest adopts an unsensational, pseudo-documentary approach that concentrates on the often laborious details of police procedure as the identity of dead woman is ascertained and her killer is slowly unmasked."

== Notes ==
Footnotes
