= It's a Wonderful World (1956 film) =

1956 British film by Val Guest

- Original British 1-sheet poster
- Directed by: Val Guest
- Written by: Val Guest
- Produced by: George Minter
- Starring: Terence Morgan; George Cole; Mylène Demongeot; Kathleen Harrison
- Cinematography: Wilkie Cooper
- Edited by: John Pomeroy
- Music by: Robert Farnon
- Distributed by: Renown Pictures
- Release date: 28 August 1956
- Running time: 89 minutes
- Country: United Kingdom
- Language: English

It's a Wonderful World is a 1956 British musical film directed and written by Val Guest and starring Terence Morgan, George Cole, Mylène Demongeot (in her first English-language film) and Kathleen Harrison. It also features Dennis Lotis, a popular singer at the time.

== Plot ==
In London, Ray and Ken are two struggling composers of popular songs, and they make friends with a young French singer, Georgie, newly arrived from Paris. She likes one of the songs Ray and Ken have written, and chooses to sing it when she gets an audition with bandleader Ted Heath, and she is hired as their singer. Unaware of this, Ken stumbles across another route to success when his broken record player plays his records backwards, and he uses a tape recorder to create a piece of music by playing the recording tape backwards, which he thinks sounds similar to a newly successful kind of music. He attributes the music to a fictitious avant garde composer, Rimsikoff, living abroad, and when the music is performed at a concert, most of the public and critics are duped. Georgie discovers what they are doing and warns them off, and when they learn of her success with their song, they decide Rimsikoff will 'retire'.

== Cast ==
- Terence Morgan as Ray Thompson
- George Cole as Ken Miller
- Kathleen Harrison as Miss Gilly
- Mylène Demongeot as Georgie Dubois (credited as Mylène Nicole)
- Dennis Lotis as Himself
- Ted Heath and His Music as Themselves
- James Hayter as Bert Fielding
- Harold Lang as Mervyn Wade
- Maurice Kaufmann as Paul Taylor
- Richard Wattis as Harold
- Reginald Beckwith as Professional Manager
- Charles Clay as Sir Thomas Van Broughton
- Derek Blomfield as Arranger
- Sam Kydd as Attendant
- Shirley Anne Field as Pretty Girl (credited as Shirley Ann Field)
- Jon Pertwee as Conductor (uncredited)
- Hal Osmond as Removal Man

== Production ==
It was made at Shepperton Studios. Val Guest said "That was quite an experience. It featured the band and the people in it. That was a musical, I wrote the numbers, Ted Heath wrote some, I wrote some of the point numbers. We did it between us... That was originally, by the way, called It’s a Great Life... but then we found there’s an American film called that so I changed it to It’s a Wonderful World."

== Songs ==
Songs include: "Rosanne", "When You Came Along", "Girls! Girls! Girls!" (Ted Heath, Moira Heath), "A Few Kisses Ago" (Robert Farnon, Val Guest), and "The Hawaiian War Chant" (Ted Heath).

== Critical reception ==
The Monthly Film Bulletin wrote: "A somewhat cheerless comedy liberally laced with sob and swing numbers. The script relentlessly tracks down every particle of humour to be wrung from comic landladies, teenage crooner fans, arty music critics and the general inanities of Tin Pan Alley. Ted Heath and his Music perform with drive and authority."

Picture Show wrote: "Excellent musical comedy ... Wonderful entertainment."

Variety wrote: "Starting off through the blare of Ted Heath's orchestra, and the crazy gyrations of screaming swing-mad teenagers, this comedy develops into a gay satirical yarn ... Morgan is satisfying as the plodding musician, gaining equal amounts of sympathy and laughs, but it is to George Cole, with his dry humor and expressive face that most of the best lines fall. Kathleen Harrison is her sturdy cockney self as the adamant housekeeper and James Hayter and Reginald Beckwith give sterling characterizations of the music publishing boss and his chief aide. Harold Lang injects the right amount of opportunism as a snooping columnist, and Dennis Lotis croons soulfully in his own personality. Band grouping and good lighting effects form a colorful, melodious background to what is, first and last, for the lowbrow appetite."

Allmovie wrote: "director Val Guest manages to extract new laughs out of such old setpieces as showing a snobbish audience being gradually won over by pop music. The principal attraction of It's a Wonderful World – to modern viewers, at least – is the presence of Ted Heath, whose screen appearances were rare."
