= The Body Said No! =

1950 British film by Val Guest

- UK theatrical release poster
- Directed by: Val Guest
- Written by: Val Guest
- Produced by: Daniel Angel
- Starring: Michael Rennie; Yolande Donlan; Hy Hazell
- Cinematography: Bert Mason
- Edited by: Sam Simmonds
- Music by: Ronald Hanmer
- Production companies: Angel Productions; Grand National Film Productions
- Distributed by: Eros Films
- Release date: 8 May 1950
- Running time: 75 minutes
- Country: United Kingdom
- Language: English

The Body Said No! is a 1950 British crime comedy film directed and written by Val Guest and starring Michael Rennie, Yolande Donlan, and Hy Hazell. It was shot at Walton Studios near London and distributed by Eros Films.

== Plot ==
In a British TV studio, Michael Rennie (as himself) is performing live in a dramatic broadcast. On a neighbouring set, cabaret singer Mikki Brent thinks she sees a coded plot being discussed to murder Rennie. Her friends are sceptical, but she warns Rennie, and various adventures and investigations ensue.

== Cast ==
- Michael Rennie as The Body
- Yolande Donlan as Mikki Brent
- Hy Hazell as Sue
- Jon Pertwee as Watchman
- Valentine Dyall as John Sutherland
- Reginald Beckwith as Benton
- Arthur Hill as Robin King
- Cyril Smith as Sergeant
- Jack Billings as Eddie
- Peter Butterworth as Driver
- Maggie Rennie as Mrs. Rennie
- Joyce Heron as Journalist
- Winifred Shotter as TV Announcer
- Eddie Vitch as Diner
- Ivan Craig as Derek
- Barry O'Neill as Constable
- Jack Faint as Anton
- Sam Kydd as Sam

== Production ==
The film was written as a vehicle for Yolande Dolan. She was reunited with Michael Rennie who had appeared with her in Miss Pilgrim's Progress (1949).

== Critical reception ==
The Monthly Film Bulletin wrote: "Cabaret numbers help to fill out the slim material, and Yolande Donlan as the dizzy girl provides her own brand of accomplished comedy."

Kine Weekly wrote: "The picture, staged in authentic atmosphere, introduces cabaret turns without lessening tension. The bright and colourful asides not only prevent thc basic joke from being overplayed, but enable t!ie star fully to exploit her charm and versatility. Laughable and thrilling in turn, it's rattling good money's worth."

TV Guide wrote: "an early inside glimpse of the television world, but a paranoid no-brainer."
