= Miss Pilgrim's Progress =

- Australian theatrical release poster
- Directed by: Val Guest
- Written by: Val Guest
- Produced by: Nat Cohen; Daniel Angel
- Starring: Michael Rennie; Yolande Donlan; Garry Marsh
- Cinematography: Bert Mason
- Edited by: Douglas Myers
- Music by: Philip Martell; Ronald Hanmer (uncredited)
- Production company: Angel Productions
- Distributed by: Grand National Pictures
- Release date: 29 November 1949 (London)
- Running time: 82 minutes
- Country: United Kingdom
- Language: English

Miss Pilgrim's Progress is a 1949 black-and-white British comedy film directed and written by Val Guest and starring Michael Rennie, Yolande Donlan and Garry Marsh.

== Plot ==
Laramie Pilgrim is an American exchange factory worker who trades places with an upper class British girl. After much adjusting to English country life, and with the various attendant culture clashes, Miss Pilgrim comes to the rescue of her new village and its exploitation by a local land developer.

== Cast ==
- Michael Rennie as Bob Thane
- Yolande Donlan as Laramie Pilgrim
- Garry Marsh as the Mayor
- Emrys Jones as the vicar
- Reginald Beckwith as Mr Jenkins
- Helena Pickard as Mrs Jenkins
- Jon Pertwee as postmaster
- Richard Littledale as M. Thane
- Bruce Belfrage as factory manager
- Valentine Dyall as Superintendent of Manuscripts
- Peter Butterworth as Jonathon
- Avril Angers as first factory girl

Uncredited:

- Ivan Craig as town planner
- Arthur Hill as American Vice-Consul
- Marianne Stone as second factory girl

== Production ==
Val Guest wrote the film as a vehicle for Yolande Dolan, who had been a sensation in London in Born Yesterday and whom he would later marry. The male lead was Michael Rennie, whom Guest had given his first leading man part; Rennie returned from Hollywood to appear in it.

The film was financed by Grand National Pictures. It also had investment from Nat Cohen.

Guest says the film was "a big success" and led to Dolan and Rennie being reunited on The Body Said No!.

== Reception ==
The Monthly Film Bulletin wrote: "After a slow and sticky start full of conventional good neighbourly jokes about drug stores and English coffee, the comedy improves owing to a performance of engaging idiocy by Yolande Donlan."

Kine Weekly wrote: "Warm and witty English romantic comedy, staged in picturesque surroundings. ... Yolande Donlan, the American actress. is perfect in the name part and, generously supported by a carefully chosen British cast, engagingly makes the point of the unassuming yet definitely worthwhile and entertaining screenplay."

Variety wrote: "Finished product lacks the polish and sophistication to justify US success ... Yolande Donlan has an easy stint as the American visitor but lacks the vigor and appeal the character demands. Michael Rennie is not too happily cast as her co-romantic lead."

TV Guide gave the film two out of four stars, and wrote, "The script relies on the surefire technique of cultural differences for humor, with the English countryside providing a pleasant background."
