= How to Undress in Public Without Undue Embarrassment =

1965 British film by Compton Bennett

- Theatrical release poster
- Directed by: Compton Bennett
- Written by: Compton Bennett
- Produced by: Compton Bennett
- Starring: Jon Pertwee; Christine Child; Zelma Malik; Reginald Beckwith; Kenneth Connor
- Cinematography: Ronnie Anscombe
- Edited by: William Lewthwaite
- Music by: Geoffrey Wright
- Production company: Welbeck Films Ltd
- Release date: 1965
- Running time: 46 minutes
- Country: United Kingdom
- Language: English

How to Undress in Public Without Undue Embarrassment is a 1965 British short comedy film directed and written by Compton Bennett and starring Jon Pertwee, Christine Child, Zelma Malik, Reginald Beckwith, and Kenneth Connor, with narration by Fenella Fielding and John Deacon.

== Plot ==
A series of comic sketches, most featuring Jon Pertwee, intercut with newsreel footage, artworks and photographs, with the common theme of undressing, including modern striptease, Victorian modesty and naturism.

== Cast ==
- Fenella Fielding (narration)
- John Deacon (narration)
- Gloria Johnson
- Margaret Withers
- June and Johnny
- Sula Freeman
- Dani Sheridan
- Leon Green
- Vyvyan Dunbar
- Jon Pertwee
- Reginald Beckwith
- Zelma Malik
- Kenneth Connor
- Christine Child

== Production ==
According to the BFI, "Two versions exist; domestic and overseas versions. In the overseas version, much of the material is the same but in a different order and is more explicit."

It was Bennett's last film.

== Critical reception ==
The Monthly Film Bulletin wrote: "A divertissement on the subject of undressing in public, this is a compound of old drawings, paintings and engravings, vintage newsreel extracts, striptease performances, nude dancers, naturist hi-jinks, and various acted episodes of humorous intent, in some instances akin to revue sketches. Most of the work falls to Jon Pertwee, who plays a succession of roles ranging from Adam in the Garden of Eden to a starchy, disapproving Mr. Grundy who is finally converted to the pleasures of striptease by Fenella Fielding's urging commentary. Most successful is a naturist skit presented in the form of a newsreel about nudist-camp activities, but in general the satire is blunt and the presentation lacks sparkle."

== Home media ==
The film was released on DVD in 2021 by Renown Films.
