= Mr Drake's Duck =

1951 British film by Val Guest

- Directed by: Val Guest
- Written by: Ian Messiter; Val Guest
- Produced by: Daniel M. Angel
- Starring: Douglas Fairbanks Jr. Yolande Donlan; Jon Pertwee
- Cinematography: Jack E. Cox
- Edited by: Sam Simmonds
- Music by: Bruce Campbell
- Distributed by: Eros Films (UK); United Artists (US)
- Release date: 7 February 1951
- Running time: 85 minutes
- Country: United Kingdom
- Language: English
- Budget: £100,000

Mr Drake's Duck (also known as Mister Drake's Duck) is a 1951 British science-fiction comedy film directed by Val Guest and starring Douglas Fairbanks Jr., Yolande Donlan, Jon Pertwee, Wilfrid Hyde-White and Reginald Beckwith. It was written by Ian Messiter and Guest, and concerns a farmer who discovers that one of his ducks has started laying radioactive eggs.

== Plot ==
Mr. Drake inherits Green Acres Farm in Sussex, in the English countryside, where he moves with his new American bride Penny. Because of a misunderstanding, Penny unexpectedly finds that she owns 60 ducks. She is astonished when one of the ducks begins laying radioactive eggs. As the news spreads, the Drakes come under siege by the army. Green Acres Farm is designated a prohibited area, and of all its inhabitants and visitors are made prisoners. The military launches Operation Chickweed to identify and seize the radioactive duck.

== Cast ==
- Douglas Fairbanks Jr. as Donald Drake
- Yolande Donlan as Penny Drake
- Jon Pertwee as Reuben
- Wilfrid Hyde-White as Mr. May
- Reginald Beckwith as Mr. Boothby
- Howard Marion-Crawford as Major Travers
- Peter Butterworth as Higgins
- A. E. Matthews as Brigadier Matthews
- Tom Gill as Captain White
- John Boxer as Sergeant
- Ballard Berkeley as Major Deans
- Roger Maxwell as Colonel Maitland
- Ben Williams as auctioneer

== Production ==
In a 1988 interview, Guest recalled that the film was based on a radio sketch by Ian Messiter called The Atomic Egg. Guest wrote a film treatment for Yolande Donlan, originally called Mrs Drake's Duck, but the title was changed when Douglas Fairbanks Jr agreed to star. "They got on very well Yo and Doug and we all had a lot of laughs," said Guest. Nat Cohen invested in the film. According to Guest, a lawsuit was won against the Walt Disney Company for infringement by their 1971 film The Million Dollar Duck.

== Reception ==
Picturegoer wrote: "Much on the same lines as Passport to Pimlico, this picture is amusing and ingenious, if a trifle slow in its construction. ... Yolande Donlan is excellent as the wife, and Douglas Fairbanks, jr., is very good as her handsome husband."

Picture Show wrote: "Original and nonsensical comedy ...Delightfully acted by Douglas Fairbanks Jr and Yolande Donlan, it scores also in gorgeously funny character cameos by too many of the cast to mention here. Well worth seeing."

Variety wrote: "Val Guest's script and direction is effective enough to overcome the trivialities of the plot and to insure that the pic will be a boxoffice winner in Britain. Its American prospects, too, are quite substantial and are heightened by the Douglas Fairbanks, Jr., name. The yarn is typical English humor, poking fun at the army and officialdom in general. Since the incidents are seen through the eyes of two Americans, it develops an unusually strong Anglo-American flavor. ... The good script is a real help. The few character parts are also well done. Wilfrid Hyde-White is first-rate as a civil servant from the Ministry of Agriculture and Fisheries; Howard Marion-Crawford personifies the major in charge of the operation; Jon Pertwee contributes a fine study of the dour form foreman; Reginald Beckwith scores in a small part as a bank manager; and A. E. Matthews excels as a War Office brigadier."

A. H. Weiler of The New York Times wrote: "Mister Drake's Duck is responsible for some chuckles, a few good-natured gibes at the British armed services and civil servants and the international race for atomic supremacy. ... They are, of course, laboring one joke, but do come up with enough laughs to make Mister Drake's Duck a pleasant if slight lampoon."
