= Ronald Hanmer =

British conductor, composer and arranger (1917–1994)

Ronald Hanmer (AM)
- Born: Ronald Charles Douglas Hamner; 2 February 1917; Reigate, Surrey, England, United Kingdom
- Died: 23 May 1994 (age 77); Brisbane, Australia
- Occupations: Conductor; classical composer; organist; music arranger

Ronald Charles Douglas Hanmer AM (2 February 1917 – 23 May 1994) was a British conductor, composer and arranger of light music, who spent his latter years in Australia. He was best known for his themes to the Adventures of P.C. 49 and radio serial Blue Hills, and is also noted for his large oeuvre of light orchestral and brass band compositions, as well as his arrangements of popular stage musicals. During the 1950s and 1960s he directed his own Latin-American percussion ensemble called "The Marimberos" on BBC radio and was, for a while, conductor of the Sydney Thompson Old-Time Orchestra for the programme "Take Your Partners".

== Biography ==
Ronald Charles Douglas Hanmer was born in Reigate, Surrey and studied at Blackheath Conservatory. Between 1935 and 1948 he was a theatre organist and dance band arranger. After emigrating to Australia in 1975, he was an arranger and conductor for the St Lucia Orchestra in Brisbane.

Hanmer was appointed a Member of the Order of Australia in 1992 for "service to music and musical education".

Hanmer died in Brisbane on 23 May 1994.

== Works ==
Hanmer's original works included pieces such as Bouquet de Paris, Capstan and Windlass, The Heather and the Thistle, Heritage of England, The Holly and the Mistletoe, The Oak and the Rose and Memories of Hungary, and original genre pieces in orchestral or piano versions such as On a Windy Day, Limelight Lady, Dot and Carry One, Mosquito, City Desk, and Fashion Parade.

In Britain he is remembered for his Changing Moods, which was used as the theme for the radio serial Adventures of P.C. 49. After emigrating to Australia in 1975 he was surprised to discover that his short composition Pastorale introduced the famous long-running radio serial Blue Hills. He later re-worked the piece into a longer orchestral work named Blue Hills Rhapsody, a recording of which was made with the composer conducting the Queensland Symphony Orchestra.

His works for wind ensembles included clarinet quartets and trios, flute trios, Cuckoo Quartet for two flutes and two clarinets, Two Contrasts for oboe and piano, trumpet trios, Suite for French horn and piano, Three Sketches for trumpet and piano, Suite for Seven (two flutes, oboe, three clarinets and bassoon), and a Serenade for Seven.

He also gained considerable fame in the brass band world, where his works are renowned as test pieces. For brass band, Hanmer wrote pieces such as Latin Americana, Brass Spectacular, March With a Beat, Waltz with a Beat, Mexican Fiesta and Over Hill Over Dale. For smaller brass ensembles his work includes Praeludium and Allegro for trombone, Cavatina and Allegro for E-flat horn, Arioso and Caprice for horn, Flight of Fancy, for cornet and euphonium, the fantasy Alice in Wonderland, The Four Corners of the World, Down Under, Episodes for Brass, Prelude and Rondo and Seven Up for septet, Prelude, Romance and Finale for brass quartet and the cornet quartet Foursome Fantasy.

His arrangements of musicals include Calamity Jane, Blossom Time, The Merry Widow, Viva Mexico!, Die Fledermaus, The Chocolate Soldier and La Périchole and his orchestrations of shows for amateur companies remain in demand world wide.

Some dramatic cues composed by Hanmer, titled "Tales of Drama featured in APM Music", have been featured in popular television programs, including SpongeBob SquarePants, The Ren & Stimpy Show, Ren & Stimpy "Adult Party Cartoon", Kamp Koral: SpongeBob's Under Years, The Patrick Star Show, KaBlam!, The Loud House, Rocko's Modern Life, South Park, Camp Lazlo, The Mighty B!, Animaniacs (2020), and Green Eggs and Ham.
