= Everyday Practical Electronics =

Practical Electronics
- Former editors: Fred Bennett (1971–1977); Mike Kenward (1984–1987); John Becker (1987–1990)
- Categories: Electronics
- Frequency: Monthly
- Publisher: IPC Magazines (1971–1986); Wimborne Publishing Ltd. (1992–2018); Electron Publishing Limited (2018–2024); Silicon Chip Publications Pty Ltd (2024–present)
- Founded: 1971
- Country: United Kingdom
- Language: English
- Website: www.electronpublishing.com

Practical Electronics (previously known as Everyday Practical Electronics) is a UK-published magazine that is available in print or downloadable format.

== Publication history ==
Practical Electronics was founded in 1964 by IPC Magazines as a constructors' magazine for the electronics enthusiast. (It was a sister publication to IPC's other "Practical" titles, including Practical Mechanics, Practical Motorist, Practical Television, and Practical Wireless.)

In 1971 a novice-level magazine, Everyday Electronics, was begun by the same publisher. Until 1977, both titles had the same production and editorial team.

In 1986, both titles were sold by their owner, IPC Magazines, to independent publishers and the editorial teams remained separate.

By the early 1990s, the title experienced a marked decline in market share and, in 1992, it was purchased by Wimborne Publishing Ltd. which was, at that time, the publisher of the rival, novice-level Everyday Electronics. The two magazines were merged to form Everyday with Practical Electronics (EPE) – the "with" in the title being dropped from the November 1995 issue. In February 1999, the publisher acquired the former rival, Electronics Today International, and merged it into EPE.

In November 2018, Wimborne Publishing passed EPE and all rights to earlier material, including Practical Electronics, Everyday Electronics, Hobby Electronics (which later became Electronics Monthly) and Electronics Today International to a new publisher, Electron Publishing Limited. The new publisher's first issue was January 2019, and from the April 2019 issue the magazine title changed to Practical Electronics, one of its merged publications.

Practical Electronics was transferred to Australian publishing company Silicon Chip Publications Pty Ltd in mid-2024, from which they had been licensing content for a number of years. The September 2024 issue of Practical Electronics was the first published by Silicon Chip Publications.
