= Newnes (disambiguation) =

Newnes, New South Wales is an abandoned oil shale mining site of the Wolgan Valley in Australia. It may also refer to:

- Newnes (surname), list of people with the surname
- Newnes baronets, extinct baronetcy in the United Kingdom
- Newnes Glacier, glacier in Antarctica
- Newnes railway line, defunct railway line in Australia
- Frank Newnes Glacier, glacier in Antarctica
- Lady Newnes Bay, bay in Antarctica
- George Newnes Ltd, British publisher
