= Lynton Village railway station =

Railway station in Devon, England

Coordinates: 51.2312°N 3.8355°W

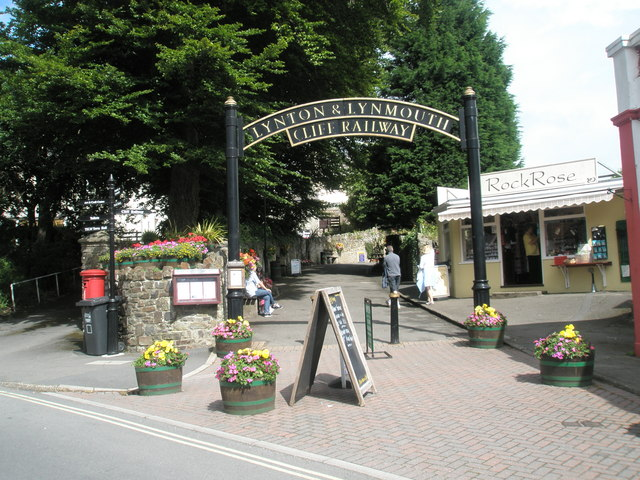
The entrance to the station

Lynton Village railway station is a station in Lynton, Devon, England served by the Lynton and Lynmouth Cliff Railway, a water-powered funicular railway.

== Origins ==
The high cliffs separating the two towns (then villages) were a major obstacle to economic development in the 19th century. Because of the remoteness of the area, and rugged geography, villagers had to rely on the sea for most deliveries of coal, lime, foodstuffs and other essentials, which had then to be carried by packhorses and carts up the steep hill to Lynton.

The cliffs also posed problems for the burgeoning tourist industry. Holiday makers began to arrive at Lynmouth on paddle steamers from Bristol, Swansea and other Bristol Channel ports, from about 1820. Ponies, donkeys and carriages were available for hire, but the steep gradients led to the animals having only short working lives.

The first proposals for a rail-based lift, able to carry passengers and goods, were made in 1881, although this first scheme was to have been steam powered.

== Construction ==
The water-powered railway was designed by George Croydon Marks (later Baron Marks of Woolwich), and paid for mainly by his business partner, the publisher Sir George Newnes. Newnes, who owned a large residence at nearby Hollerday Hill, also backed the Lynton & Barnstaple Railway in 1898, and the Lynton Town Hall in 1900.

Construction work – relying entirely on manual labour – began in 1887 and was completed in less than three years. The railway uses clifftop railway cars designed to operate like lifts. The railway comprises two cars, each capable of transporting 40 passengers, joined by a continuous cable running around a 5 ft 6 in (1.676 m) pulley at each end of the incline.

Water feeds through 5-inch (127 mm) pipes from the West Lyn River – over a mile away – into tanks under the floor of the upper car. Each car has a 700-imperial-gallon (3,182 L; 841 US gal) tank mounted between the wheels. Water is discharged from the lower car, until the heavier top car begins to descend, with the speed controlled by a brakeman traveling on each car.

The parallel 3 ft 9 in (1,143 mm) gauge[2] tracks (which bow out at the centre point, to allow the cars to pass) rise 500 feet (152.4 m) and are 862 feet (262.7 m) long, giving the line a gradient of 1:1.724 (58%).

== Operations ==
An Act of Parliament formed the Lynmouth & Lynton Lift Company in 1888, and a further Act gave the company perpetual rights to the water from the Lyn Valley. Opened on Easter Monday in 1890, the railway has been in continuous use ever since. It is a private railway and not part of National Rail. The station has two platforms, a cafe and plenty of room for crowded days. Trains run frequently to Lynmouth Bay.

An unusual feature for such a line is a halt just below Lynton station, with road access, at North Walk. This was used to transport larger freight items (the car bodies can be removed to provide a flat load bed). Early motor cars were carried up the hill in this way. During rail replacement over the winter of 2006, the halt was used extensively for access and material storage. The railway is now classified as a listed monument.

Preceding station	Heritage railways	Following station
Lynmouth Bay	Clifftop Trains; Lynton & Lynmouth Railway	Terminus
