= Newnes (surname) =

Newnes is a surname. Notable people with the surname include:

- Billy Newnes (born 1959), British jockey
- David Newnes, Australian lawyer and judge
- Frank Newnes (1876–1955), British publisher and businessman
- George Newnes (1851–1910), British publisher
- Jack Newnes (1895–1969), Welsh football player
- Jack Newnes (Australian footballer) (born 1993), Australian rules football player

== See also ==
- Newnes (disambiguation)
