= Frederick James Camm =

- Born: 6 October 1895; Windsor, Berkshire, England
- Died: 18 February 1959 (aged 63); Windsor, Berkshire, England
- Resting place: Twickenham Cemetery
- Employer: George Newnes Ltd
- Known for: "Camm's Comics," including Practical Mechanics, Practical Motorist, Practical Television, and Practical Wireless
- Relatives: (brother) Sydney Camm

Frederick James "F.J." Camm (6 October 1895 – 18 February 1959) was an English technical author and magazine editor. He founded several radio and electronics titles, including Practical Mechanics, Practical Motorist, Practical Television, and Practical Wireless, some of which are still in circulation.

== Biography ==
Camm was born in Windsor, England, the second child of twelve. The eldest, Sydney Camm, became a famous aircraft designer.

He shared with Sydney an early interest in building model aeroplanes and this led him to move to London in 1918. Here, he became a technical editor for Benn Brothers in aviation and engineering. From there he worked for Pitmans Publishers and moved eventually, with his friend Molloy, to George Newnes. It was there that he was to produce the Hobbies journals. In 1932, his supplement to Hobbies magazine, Practical Wireless was launched as an independent title, with F.J. as editor. Thus began a highly productive period, marked by his creation and stewardship of the Practical series of magazines for Newnes. These were often known as "Camm's Comics:"

- Practical Engineering (published weekly from 27 January 1940)
- Practical Home Money Maker (published monthly from October 1957)
- Practical Householder (Oct. 1955–c. 1970)
- Practical Mechanics (1933–1963)
- Practical Motorist (1934–1997)
- Practical Television (1934–1938, 1950–2008)
- Practical Wireless (1932–present)

(In addition, Newnes' parent company, IPC, started Practical Electronics in 1964; it remains in publication.)

At least 12 editions were produced of the Wireless Constructor's Encyclopaedia from about 1932 to 1957, mostly or entirely written by F. J. Camm. He went on to write or edit over a hundred technical books in such fields as radio, television, aviation, and automotive engineering.

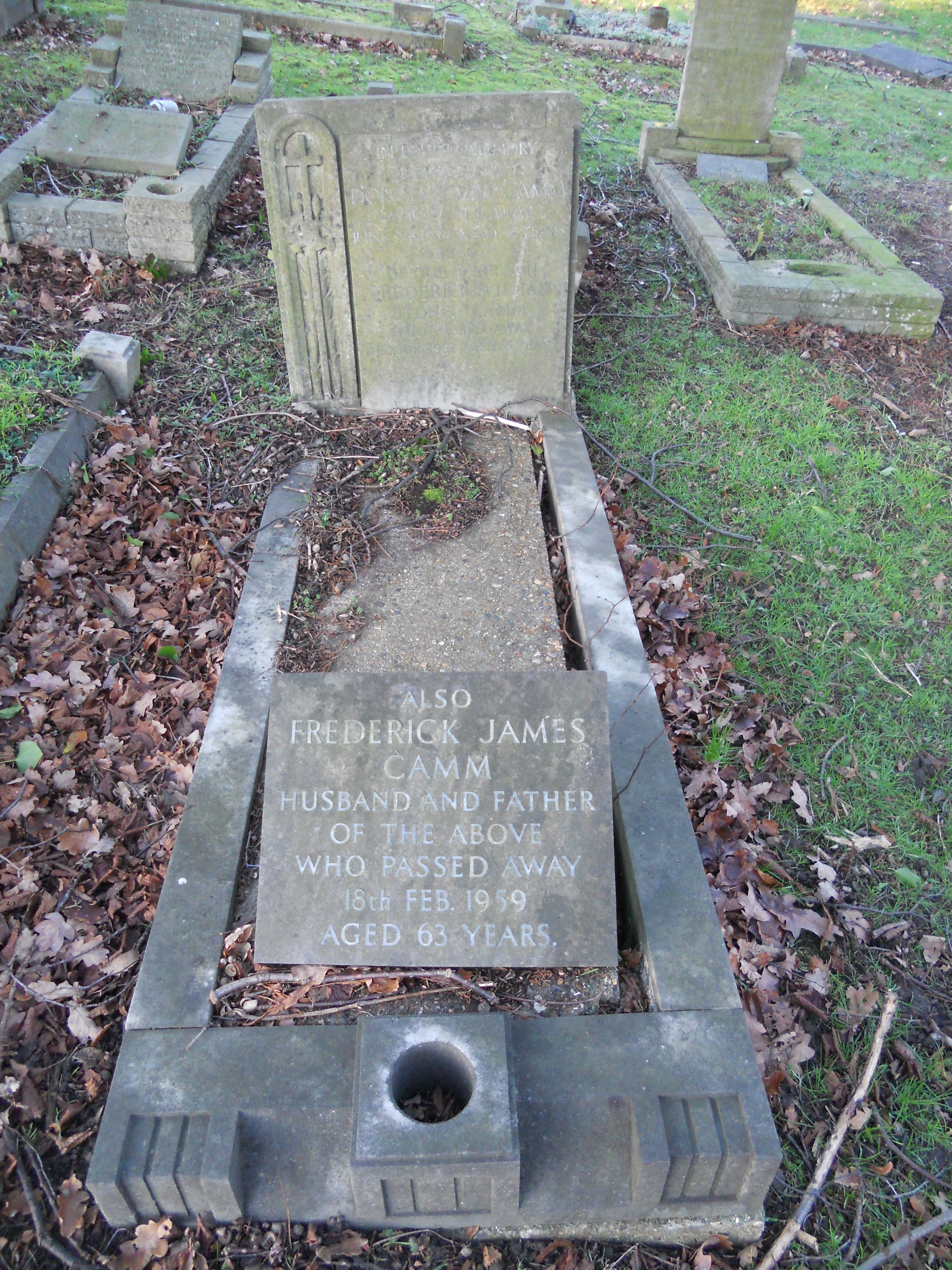
Family grave of Frederick James Camm in Twickenham Cemetery in 2014

Camm died of bronchial pneumonia at his home in Windsor in 1959 and is buried in the family grave at Twickenham Cemetery.
