= Bridgnorth Cliff Railway =

Funicular railway in Bridgnorth, Shropshire, England

Coordinates: 52.534°N 2.417°W

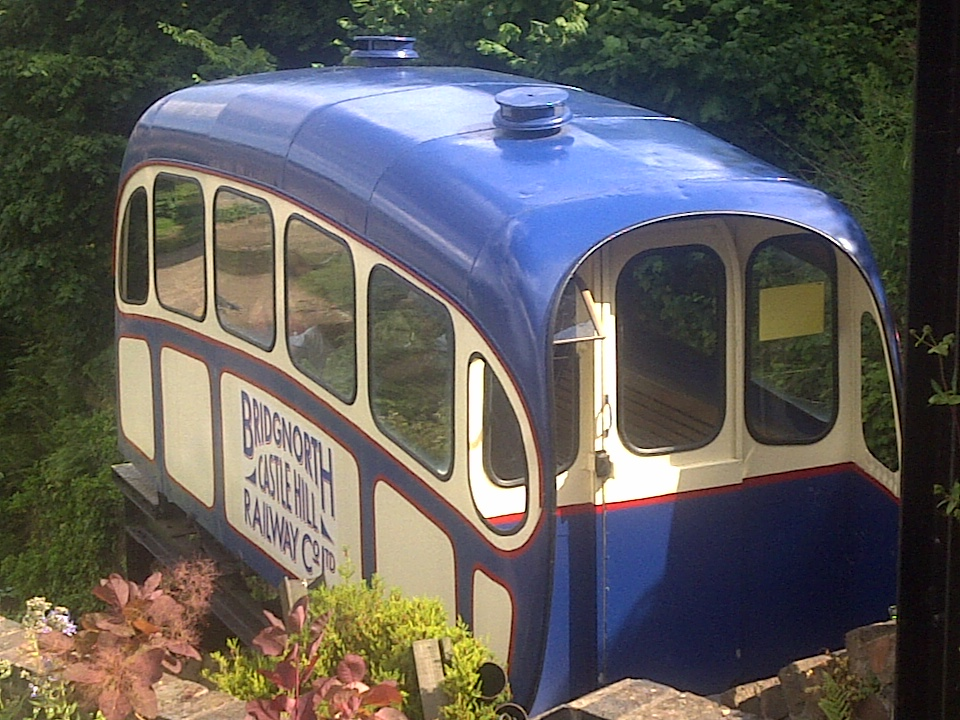
Descending carriage

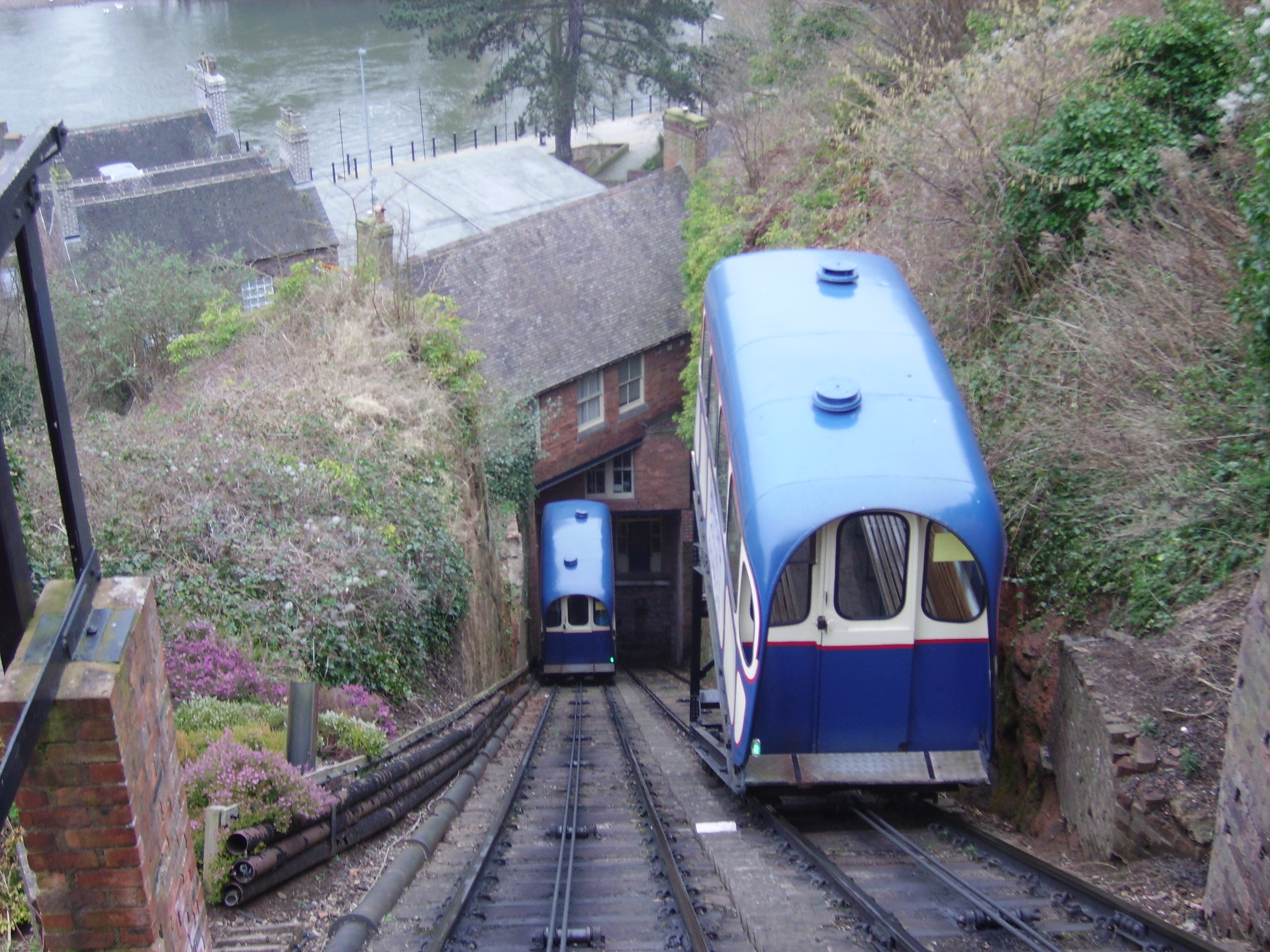
Bridgnorth Cliff Railway carriages viewed from above

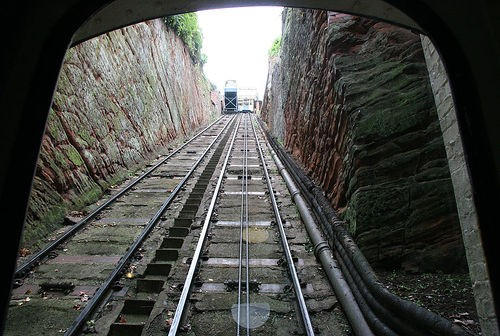
Looking up from the bottom station.

The Bridgnorth Cliff Railway, also known as the Bridgnorth Funicular Railway or Castle Hill Railway, is a funicular railway in the town of Bridgnorth in the English county of Shropshire. The line links the Low Town of Bridgnorth, adjacent to the River Severn, with the High Town, adjacent to the ruins of Bridgnorth Castle. The line is one of four funicular railways in the UK built to the same basic design (the others were the Clifton Rocks Railway in Bristol; the Lynton and Lynmouth Cliff Railway in Devon; and the Constitution Hill Railway in Aberystwyth, Wales). With a maximum gradient of 64% it is one of the steepest railways in the country.

== History ==
Following a public meeting in 1890 to discuss an alternative method of communication between the two parts of Bridgnorth to the 200 steps between High Town and Low Town, a proposal to build a Patent Cliff Railway was put to the town council. Engineered by George Croydon Marks, plans were accepted for funicular railway on the current route. The Bridgnorth Castle Hill Railway Company Ltd was registered in 1891, and construction started on 2 November 1891. The company, which still operates the railway today, was founded by Sir George Croydon Marks (later Lord Marks of Woolwich), who became its first managing director from 1891 until 1901. His brother, Edward Marks, became its second managing director from 1901 until 1924. George was also the founder of the patent attorneys Marks & Clerk, who continue to trade. The railway was opened on 7 July 1892 by Mayor John Anderson, with a public holiday being proclaimed to celebrate the occasion.

Most of the original funding came from George Croydon Marks' business partner, Sir George Newnes, MP, a wealthy publisher, who purchased eighty-five per cent of the share capital in Bridgnorth Cliff Railway and who became its first chairman. Newnes was already chairman of Lynton & Lynmouth Cliff Railway and went on to collaborate with Marks on other funicular projects. Newnes, who had previously founded Tit-bits and The Strand Magazine, went on to publish Country Life.

Originally the line was a water balance railway. Water was pumped into a 2,000-imperial-gallon (9,100 L; 2,400 US gal) tank beneath the top car until its weight, a maximum of 11.5 long tons (11.7 tonnes), overcame that of the lower car. When the car reached the bottom station the tank was emptied and pumped up to a 30,000-imperial-gallon (140,000 L; 36,000 US gal) tank on the top of the upper station.

Between 1943 and 1944 the system was rebuilt to use electricity, with an official re-opening on 9 May 1944 by Mayor T.C. Pembro – who had taken office only 2 hours previously. In 1955 the original heavy wooden cars were replaced by the 'up-to-date' stronger and lighter (5.4 long tons or 5.5 tonnes) aluminium monocoque ones still in use today. Each car can carry up to 18 passengers.

The rails were replaced in about 1972 with the bullhead design formerly used on mainline railways.

On 1 August 2015, Sir Robert McAlpine unveiled a Transport Trust Red Wheel plaque at the cliff railway's top station commemorating Sir George Croydon Marks. A director of Lynton & Lynmouth Cliff Railway, and one of his sons, being distant cousins of both Marks and the current Bridgnorth directors, were present. Also present for the unveiling were Edward Marks' grandson and other descendants.

== Current situation ==
In December 2022 the railway was closed amid safety concerns over a serious crack in the retaining wall, causing 14 of the 16 drivers and engineers employed to be made redundant. Work to repair the crack was due to commence on 27 March 2023, raising hopes for the staff to be re-employed when work finished. However this optimism proved premature as more work was identified as being needed. This finally commenced in September 2023 and the railway reopened on 4 March 2024.

Prior to its closure, the railway operated 362 days a year (closing on Christmas Day, Boxing Day and New Year's Day). Each journey takes about one and a quarter minutes, and on an average day approximately 200 trips were made.

The line has the following technical parameters:

- Length: 201 feet (61 m)
- Height: 111 feet (34 m)
- Maximum Steepness: 64%
- Cars: 2
- Capacity: 18 passengers per car
- Configuration: Double track
- Track gauge: 3 ft 6 in (1,067 mm)
- Traction: Electricity
- Operation: Manually driven from upper station

The railway is owned and operated by a private company, The Bridgnorth Castle Hill Railway Company Limited, which was incorporated on 5 October 1891. The current owners, who acquired the company and cliff railway in 2011, are direct descendants of George Croydon Marks' third cousin, all being descended from one Nicholas Jonas (later Jones) of Tawstock near Barnstaple, north Devon. Other descendants of Jonas were the brothers Tom and Bob Jones, who founded Lynton and Lynmouth Cliff Railway, which was also engineered by the Marks brothers.

== In the media ==
On 10 January 2013, the Bridgnorth Cliff Railway was featured in an episode of the fourth series of Great British Railway Journeys; when presenter Michael Portillo interviewed the company's secretary.

In June 2017, three weeks before the 125th anniversary of the cliff railway's inauguration, the company published the fourth edition of George Croydon Marks' booklet "Bridgnorth and Its Castle Hill Railway" which had first appeared on the inaugural day. The fourth edition was a facsimile of the first, but with the foreword page having been written by a current director of the company, being the granddaughter of Marks' third cousin.

On 5 October 2018, Bridgnorth Cliff Railway featured as the answer to a question in the long-running BBC television quiz Mastermind. In the general knowledge round contestants were asked which Shropshire town on the River Severn had a funicular railway connecting its High Town with its Low Town.

== See also ==
- Funicular railway
- List of funicular railways
- Bridgnorth railway station
