= The Naughtiest Girl =

Series of novels by Enid Blyton

- The Naughtiest Girl in the School; The Naughtiest Girl Again; The Naughtiest Girl is a Monitor; Here's the Naughtiest Girl!
- Author: Enid Blyton and Anne Digby
- Country: United Kingdom
- Language: English
- Genre: Children's literature
- Published: 1940–2001
- No. of books: 4 (in the original series then the additional six by Anne Digby)

The Naughtiest Girl is a series of children's novels written by Enid Blyton in the 1940s–1950s. Unusually, they are set at a progressive boarding school rather than a traditional one. The school, Whyteleafe, bears a striking resemblance to the independent Suffolk boarding school, Summerhill. Anne Digby, author of the Trebizon series, has written some additional books in the series.

== Characters ==
The main character is Elizabeth Allen, a very spoiled girl whose misbehaviour causes her governesses to leave. She is sent to Whyteleafe School and is determined to behave so badly that she will be expelled. But, in the middle of her first term, she discovers how lonely she was as an only child, and starts to behave. The second main character is her best friend Joan Townsend, who does her best to get Elizabeth to behave. Also, in the second book, The Naughtiest Girl Again, she makes two enemies (Robert Jones and Kathleen Peters) but then becomes great friends with them later on; while the third book The Naughtiest Girl is a Monitor, is as much about fellow pupils Julian and Arabella as it is about her.

- Joan Townsend - Elizabeth's best friend
- Julian Holland - Another close friend of Elizabeth
- Miss Belle - Headmistress
- Miss Ranger - First Form Mistress
- Miss Best - The other headmistress
- Robert Jones - A bully who later becomes a friend of Elizabeth's
- Kathleen Peters - A spiteful social outcast, who also becomes a friend of Elizabeth's
- Arabella Buckley - A girl who's even more spoilt than Elizabeth
- Rosemary - A girl who follows Arabella everywhere
- John Terry - Head boy of the school gardens under Mr Johns
- Patrick Holland - Julian's cousin and has similar facial features as Julian
- William - Head Boy of Whyteleafe when Elizabeth first arrived
- Rita - Head Girl alongside William
- Thomas Hill - Head Boy after William and Rita left Whyteleafe
- Emma Glover - Head Girl alongside Thomas and is head of the table-tennis squad
- Nora O'Sullivan - An Irish girl who was Elizabeth's monitor when she first arrived at Whyteleafe
- Eileen - A monitor and captain of sports team at Whyteleafe. She also plays tennis doubles with Patrick sometimes
- Susan - Joan's friend and the girl who took Elizabeth's place as a monitor when she was stripped off the position in the middle of a term
- Kerry Dane - A famous actress who came to Whyteleafe and was cured of her bad ways when she left to continue her acting career after her birthday
- Tina Wilson - Also known as 'Teeny', a small, timid junior girl in 'The Naughtiest Girl Helps a Friend'
- Mr Warlow - Sports Master
- Mr Lewis - The elderly music master at Whyteleafe who teaches the piano, violin and flute
- Richard Watson - A talented musician who plays both piano and violin beautifully and plans to become a famous musician one day. He played duets with Elizabeth at the school concert
- Roger Brown - A senior boy in 'The Naughtiest Girl Keeps a Secret' where he was forced to keep his position in the school tennis team though he was only clinging on to it by his fingers. In the end, his father understood that Roger's gifts are not in sports. He won an academic scholarship at Hickling Green school
- Jake Johnson - A big second form boy, who was great at hockey, in 'The Naughtiest Girl Marches On' who overcame a personal crisis, helped by Elizabeth
- Mr Leslie - Science Master and Second Form Master

== Books ==
- The Naughtiest Girl in the School (1940)
- The Naughtiest Girl Again (1942)
- The Naughtiest Girl is a Monitor (1945)
- Here's the Naughtiest Girl! (1952)

=== Anne Digby continuation ===
The titles added by Anne Digby, at the invitation of the Enid Blyton copyright proprietors, were described as "seamless" by one reviewer in that they persuasively recreated the genuine publication and atmosphere but "with welcome touches of greenness and conservationism" These are:

- The Naughtiest Girl Keeps a Secret (1999)
- The Naughtiest Girl Helps a Friend (1999)
- The Naughtiest Girl Saves the Day (2000)
- Well Done, the Naughtiest Girl! (2000)
- The Naughtiest Girl Wants to Win (2001)
- The Naughtiest Girl Marches On (2001)

All ten titles in both series remain in print.
