= Saltburn Pier =

Pier in North Yorkshire, England

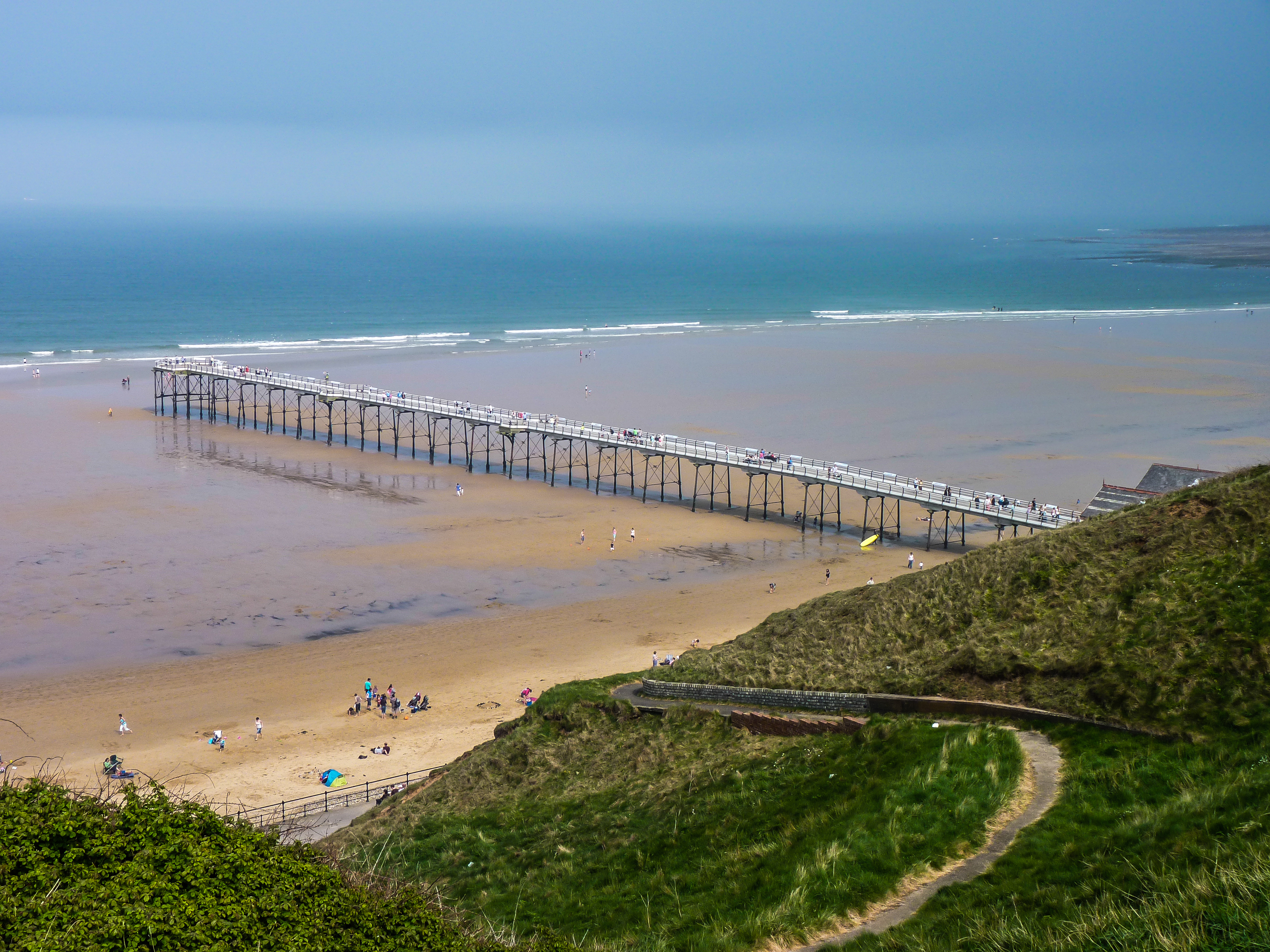
- Saltburn Pier, 2011
- Type: Pleasure
- Carries: pedestrians
- Spans: North Sea
- Location: Saltburn-by-the-Sea, Redcar and Cleveland
- Coordinates: 54°35′10.46″N 0°58′14.61″W
- Owner: Redcar and Cleveland

Characteristics
- Construction: hardwood decking on iron piles
- Total length: 681 feet (208 m)

History
- Designer: John Anderson
- Opening date: 1869

Saltburn Pier is a pier located in Saltburn-by-the-Sea, Redcar and Cleveland and the ceremonial county of North Yorkshire, England. It is the last pier remaining in Yorkshire.

== Background ==
The Stockton and Darlington Railway arrived in Saltburn from Redcar on 17 August 1861, prompting a growth in day trippers and holiday travellers.

The engineer for the railway line was John Anderson, who saw the investment opportunities in the new town, buying land from the Saltburn Improvement Company (SIC). He bought plots in Milton and Amber Streets, as well as Brittania Terrace/Marine Drive – both now Marine Parade – where he designed and erected the Alexandra Hotel. Appointed resident engineer of the SIC in 1867, he designed the town's sewerage system.

== Construction ==
In October 1867, Anderson formed the Saltburn Pier Company, to undertake construction of a suitable pier. Contracted as designer and chief design engineer, Anderson followed the new pier format developed by Eugenius Birch in his ground breaking design for Margate Pier, by specifying iron screw-piles to support a metal frame and wooden deck.

Deliveries of iron work from the Ormesby Foundry began in December 1867, with the first pile drive started by Mrs Thomas Vaughan of Gunnergate Hall on 30 December. Construction was delayed by the fact that the Board of Trade did not grant an order for the construction, the Saltburn-by-the-Sea Pier Order 1868, until 6 April 1868, while the foreshore land was not transferred to the company until 3 July 1868.

The 1,500 feet (460 m) pier opened in May 1869, with a steamer landing stage at the head of the pier and two circular kiosks at the entrance. The first steamers left the pier on 14 May 1870, with service to Middlesbrough. In the first six months of operation, there were 50,000 toll-paying visitors.

But access to the pier was difficult from the town via the steep cliff, so Anderson was contracted to build the Cliff Hoist. Constructed of wood, it allowed 20 people to be placed in a wooden cage and then lowered by rope to beach level. It opened on 1 July 1870, some 14 months after the opening of the pier, it was approached from the town by a narrow walkway. The passengers then descended 120 feet (37 m), after water had been added to or taken away from a counterbalance tank.

== Operation ==
Steamer excursions added to the companies revenue, with new seasonal trips to Hartlepool and Scarborough. This financial success enabled the Saltburn Pier Company to announce profitable dividends for its shareholders, and by October 1873 it was announced that all the shares had been disposed of.

However, on the night of 21/22 October 1875, a gale struck the pier, removing 300 feet (91 m) of the structure at the seaward end, including the pier head, landing stage and part of the pier deck. In the middle of an iron trade slump, it was decided not to replace the missing section or reconstruct a landing stage, leaving a redeveloped pier of 1,250 feet (380 m). Reopened in 1877, the debts of the company led to it being sold in 1880 at auction at the Alexandra Hotel for £800.

=== Middlesbrough Estate ===
Sold initially to the Saltburn Improvement Company (SIC), in August 1883 the SIC was bought by the owners of the Middlesbrough Estate.

The new owners had the Cliff Hoist inspected by independent engineers, who condemned it due to numerous rotten timbers, so it was demolished in late 1883. They commissioned Sir Richard Tangye's company, who had built the two earlier vertically inclined water powered funicular railways in Scarborough, to build a replacement. Tangye had appointed George Croydon Marks head of the lift department, in which role he was in charge of the design and installation at Saltburn. Marks designed and constructed the Saltburn Cliff Lift, a funicular with a height of 120 feet (37 m) and a track length of 207 feet (63 m), creating a 71% incline. Opened on Saturday 28 June 1884, it remains today the world's oldest water-balanced cliff railway.

The opening of the Cliff Lift allowed the pier company to undertake a development of facilities. As had originally been intended, a saloon was built at the pier head, while gas lighting was provided along the entire length. In 1884, the pier head was widened and windshields, a bandstand, a refreshment rooms added, and the entrance kiosks replaced to match the style of those used on the new Cliff Lift. In July 1887 the gas lighting was replaced by electricity.

After suffering slight storm damage in 1900, the pier was struck by the china clay vessel SS Ovenbeg (formerly the Russian registered SS St Nicholi), in May 1924. The collision left a 210 feet (64 m) gap in the promenade, leaving the bandstand inaccessible. The gap was replaced from March 1929, with a new theatre also built on the landside, completed in 1930 enabling the full length of the pier to open.

=== Post World War Two ===
Saltburn and Marske-by-Sea Urban District Council Act 1938
- Act of Parliament
- Parliament of the United Kingdom
- Long title: An Act to provide for the transfer to the urban district council of Saltburn and Marske-by-the-Sea of the Saltburn pier and works in connection therewith to confer other powers upon the Council and for other purposes.
- Citation: 1 & 2 Geo. 6. c. xvii

Dates
- Royal assent: 17 May 1938

Text of statute as originally enacted

Purchased by the council under the Saltburn and Marske-by-Sea Urban District Council Act 1938 (1 & 2 Geo. 6. c. xvii), the pier like others was sectioned during World War II, by having part of the deck removed by the Royal Engineers to guard against Nazi invasion. But due to its poor post war condition, repairs were not granted planning permission until 1949, and due to a shortage of steel not completed until April 1952. Officially reopened for the first time since the war on 31 May 1952, over 25,000 visitors walked the pier during the first month.

In 1953, gales resulted in £23,000 worth of repairs, which took a further five years to complete. But after completion, in 1958 two piles were lost, costing a further £6,000. In 1961 another twenty piles were twisted in storms, but repairs kept the structure open enabling 90,000 people to visit during the 1960s.

After severe storms in 1971 and 1973, piles were lost at the seaward end leaving the pier in a dangerous state. Further damage in 1974 culminated on 29 October, when the pier head was lost and the deck damaged, leaving a length of 1,100 feet (340 m).

In 1975 the council submitted an application to the Department of the Environment to have the pier demolished. A "Save the Pier" campaign led to a public enquiry, which concluded that only the final thirteen piers could be removed. This left a 681 feet (208 m) length of refurbished pier, which reopened on 29 June 1978. In 1979, the council undertook a complete refurbishment of both the pier and the Cliff Lift to reflect the Victorian/Edwardian character, by: ordering new aluminium cars for the Cliff Lift, reinstating to the design stained-glass windows; new distinct white-red cladding to all the structures; a pier head cafe.

=== Post 2000 ===
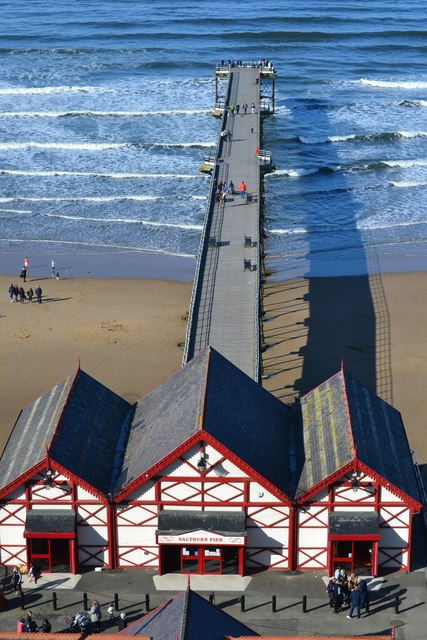
Saltburn Pier, as seen from the promenade above

In 2000, the council was successful in gaining a £1.2 million National Lottery Heritage Grant, enabling the cast iron trestles that support the pier to be conserved, and the steel deck beams replaced with traditional hardwood timber to reflect the pier’s original appearance. Reopened as a Grade II* listed building on 13 July 2001, by MP Chris Smith, the restored structure won a top placing in the Queen’s Golden Jubilee Heritage awards. In October 2005, the pier was greatly enhanced by the installation of under deck lighting which illuminates at night, and in 2009, the National Piers Society awarded it pier of the year. The pier celebrated its 150th anniversary on 11 May 2019 when a new lighting system was switched on.

== Video footage ==
- Sunrise at Saltburn Pier, North Yorkshire - Yorkshire Coast
- Saltburn Pier Waves

Awards and achievements
Preceded by Deal Pier	National Piers Society; Pier of the Year; 2009	Succeeded by Boscombe Pier
