= The Naughtiest Girl Again =

Novel by Enid Blyton

- First edition
- Author: Enid Blyton
- Illustrator: W. Lindsay Cable
- Language: English
- Series: The Naughtiest Girl series
- Genre: School
- Publisher: George Newnes Ltd
- Publication date: 1942
- Publication place: United Kingdom
- Preceded by: The Naughtiest Girl in the School
- Followed by: The Naughtiest Girl is a Monitor

The Naughtiest Girl Again is the second novel in The Naughtiest Girl series of novels by Enid Blyton. It is about older and not-so-spoiled Elizabeth Allen is in her second term at Whyteleafe School.

== Plot ==
Elizabeth Allen, older and no longer having a spoiled personality, goes on to her second term at Whyteleafe School. She makes two enemies, Robert and Kathleen. Robert is a bully and Kathleen plays mean tricks on Jenny and Elizabeth. Elizabeth does not want to misbehave again, but someone tries to make sure that she does not forget her nickname of 'The Naughtiest Girl in the School'. Elizabeth tries to hunt down the sneak who is playing tricks on her and her friend Joan, leading to many adventures.

== New characters ==
- Kathleen:

She is described as a mean, ugly girl who is jealous of others because of their good looks. She plays spiteful tricks on Elizabeth and Jenny and almost runs away due to the consequences. But in the end she overcomes her flaws and becomes more likeable.

- Jenny:

Jenny is a nice girl. She has a talent for mimicking others, she accidentally mimics Mamzelle scolding Kathleen, which encourages Kathleen play tricks on her. She is also very fond of white mice.

- Robert:

Robert is the main antagonist of the book, he was a bully because he had been jealous of his younger brothers, who has been given more attention, and everyone forgot about him. He is also fond of riding and is in charge of horses. He changes his attitude and becomes a friend of Elizabeth's.

== Reception ==
Cassandra Jardine suggested in The Daily Telegraph in 2011 that Blyton's tendency to make "bludgeoning pronouncements" might make her unappealing to a modern audience, citing as an example the "high moral tone" in the following passage from The Naughtiest Girl Again:

Poor Elizabeth… she had come to see that good behaviour was best not only for herself but for the whole school too.

Similarly, Harry Wallop wrote in the same newspaper in 2014 that he found The Naughtiest Girl Again to be unacceptable reading for his daughter, citing a passage in which the head girl Rita berates the character Kathleen for eating too many sweets and not brushing her hair enough.
