= Hume-Williams baronets =

Extinct baronetcy in the Baronetage of the United Kingdom

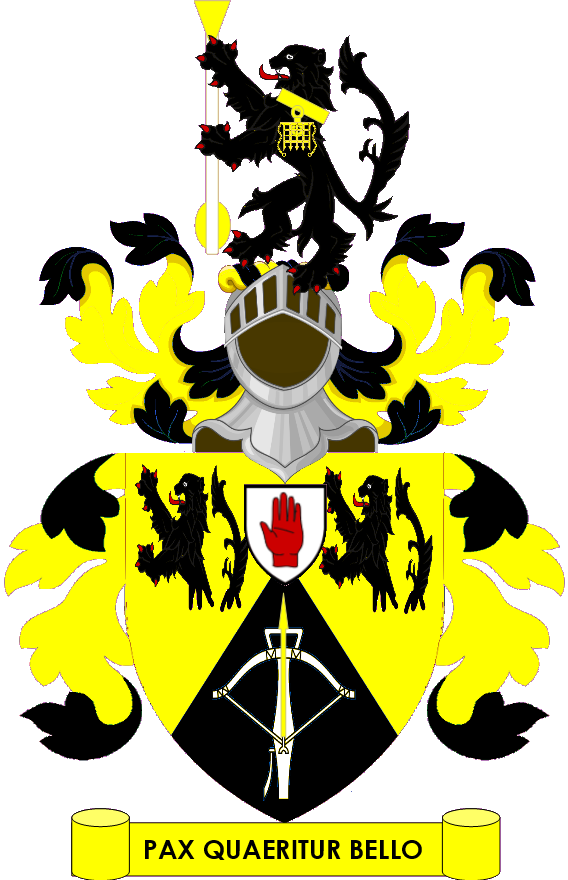
- Crest: A lion rampant Sable gorged with a collar suspended therefrom by its chains a portcullis Or and holding between the paws a bird-bolt erect Argent headed and flighted Gold.
- Shield: Per chevron Or and Sable in chief two demi-lions rampant and erased of the last and in base a crossbow bent palewise Argent the arrow of the first.
- Motto: Pax Quaeritur Bello

The Hume-Williams Baronetcy, of Ewhurst in the County of Surrey, was a title in the Baronetage of the United Kingdom. It was created on 28 November 1922 for the barrister and Conservative politician Sir Ellis Hume-Williams. The title became extinct on the death of the second Baronet in 1980.

== Hume-Williams baronets, of Ewhurst (1922) ==
- Sir Ellis William Hume-Williams, 1st Baronet (1863–1947)
- Sir Roy Ellis Hume-Williams, 2nd Baronet (1887–1980)
