= Ellis Hume-Williams =

British barrister and politician

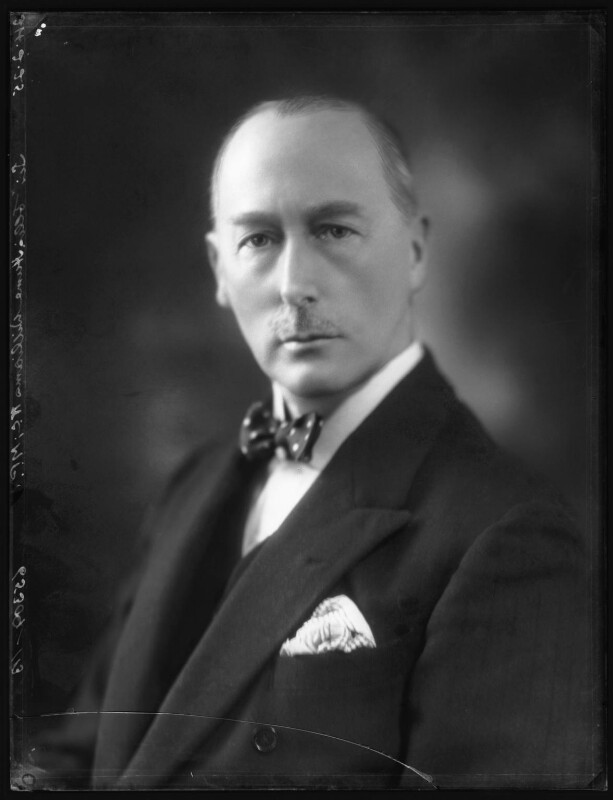
Hume-Williams in 1925

Sir Ellis William Hume-Williams, 1st Baronet KBE, PC, KC (19 August 1863 – 4 February 1947) was a British barrister and Conservative Party politician. Hume-Williams was a King's Counsel (KC), and in October 1901 was appointed Recorder of the Borough of Bury St Edmunds.

== Early life ==
Born into an Anglo-Irish family with Welsh roots, Hume-Williams' was the son of Joseph William Hume-Williams, a doctor turned barrister who built up a large practice in London 'and was for a time on the staff of the Lancet', and of his wife Agnes Charter, a daughter of James Malet Charter, of Lynchfield Hall, Bishops Lydeard, Somerset. Ellis Hume-Williams attended schools in Brighton, Germany, France and Hitchin, before going up to Trinity Hall, Cambridge, where he won the Cressingham Prize in 1879 and graduated BA and LLB. He was called to the bar in 1881.

== Career ==
Williams showed an interest in politics from an early age, perhaps unsurprisingly, since his father was a member of the Junior Carlton Club, a London Club associated with the Conservative Party. Hume-Williams was selected to fight North Monmouthshire at the 1895 general election, losing to Reginald McKenna, but reducing McKenna's majority by almost 400 votes. He next fought the Frome constituency at the 1900 general election, but again failed to be elected. At the 1906 general election, Hume-Williams fought the North Kensington constituency, another unsuccessful fight. In his autobiography, Hume-Williams claimed that he could have secured election for the safe Marylebone constituency, but did not wish to let the North Kensington Conservatives down.

At the January 1910 general election, Hume-Williams was elected as Member of Parliament for Bassetlaw in Nottinghamshire.

He was created a baronet, of Ewhurst, in the County of Surrey, in 1922. He lost his House of Commons seat at the 1929 election to Malcolm MacDonald, son of the Labour Party leader Ramsay MacDonald, and did not stand for Parliament again. He was made a Privy Counsellor in July 1929, shortly after his last electoral defeat.

Williams published his autobiography, The World, the House, and the Bar in 1930. Besides giving details of his Parliamentary career, this book outlines a number of the legal cases in which he was involved over the years.

== Personal life ==
On 6 October 1886, Hume-Williams married Lucy Annette Satow, a daughter of Theodor Satow, of Riga, Latvia. They had one son, Roy Ellis Hume-Williams (1887–1980), who succeeded as second baronet.

== Honours ==
- Knight Commander of the Most Excellent Order of the British Empire, 1918
- Knight of Grace of the Order of St John of Jerusalem
- Privy Councillor, 1929

== Arms ==
Coat of arms of Ellis Hume-Williams
| Crest A lion rampant Sable gorged with a collar suspended therefrom by its chains a portcullis Or and holding between the paws a bird-bolt erect Argent headed and flighted Gold. Motto Pax Quaeritur Bello ("Peace is sought by war") |

Parliament of the United Kingdom
| Preceded by Frank Newnes | Member of Parliament for Bassetlaw; Jan 1910–1929 | Succeeded by Malcolm MacDonald |
Baronetage of the United Kingdom
| New creation | Baronet (of Ewhurst); 1922–1947 | Succeeded by Roy Ellis Hume-Williams |
