= Foul Play Suspected =

1953 novel by John Wyndham

- First edition
- Language: English
- Publisher: Newnes
- Publication date: 1935

Foul Play Suspected is a 1935 crime novel by British writer John Wyndham. It was published by Newnes under the pen name of John Beynon.

The novel's protagonist, Detective-Inspector Jordon, also appears in two other 1930s novels by Wyndham, which remain unpublished: Murder Means Murder and Death Upon Death.
