= The Naughtiest Girl in the School =

Novel by Enid Blyton

- First edition
- Author: Enid Blyton
- Illustrator: W. Lindsay Cable
- Language: English
- Series: The Naughtiest Girl series
- Genre: School
- Published: 1940
- Publisher: George Newnes Ltd
- Media type: Print
- Pages: 224
- Preceded by: none
- Followed by: The Naughtiest Girl Again

The Naughtiest Girl in the School is the first novel in The Naughtiest Girl series by Enid Blyton, published in 1940. The title character is Elizabeth Allen, a spoiled girl who is sent to a boarding school called Whyteleafe School.
