= Practical Mechanics =

British magazine

- Cover to Practical Mechanics, "The Car Any Amateur Can Make!"
- Editor-in-chief: Frederick J. Camm
- Categories: Science and technology magazines
- Frequency: Monthly
- Publisher: George Newnes Ltd
- Founded: 1933
- First issue: October 1933
- Final issue: August 1963
- Country: United Kingdom
- Language: English

Practical Mechanics was a monthly British magazine devoted mostly to home mechanics and technology. It was first published by George Newnes, Ltd., in October 1933, and ran for 352 issues until the magazine's termination in August 1963. Practical Mechanics was edited by Frederick J. Camm until his death in 1959.

With an emphasis on things its readers could reasonably construct themselves, the magazine featured numerous articles on how to build things around one's house, such as a sink or bathtub. It also regularly featured more fanciful articles on how to build things with less obvious applications around the home, for example a Geiger counter, or an aeroplane for £25 (not including the cost of an engine).

The early issues were in black and white. The magazine began printing in color at an unknown date.

Practical Mechanics was one of a number of DIY British publications, including Practical Householder, Practical Motorist, and Practical Wireless, also founded by Frederick J. Camm.
