= Saltburn Cliff Lift =

Funicular railway in North Yorkshire, England

Coordinates: 54°35′10.46″N 0°58′14.61″W

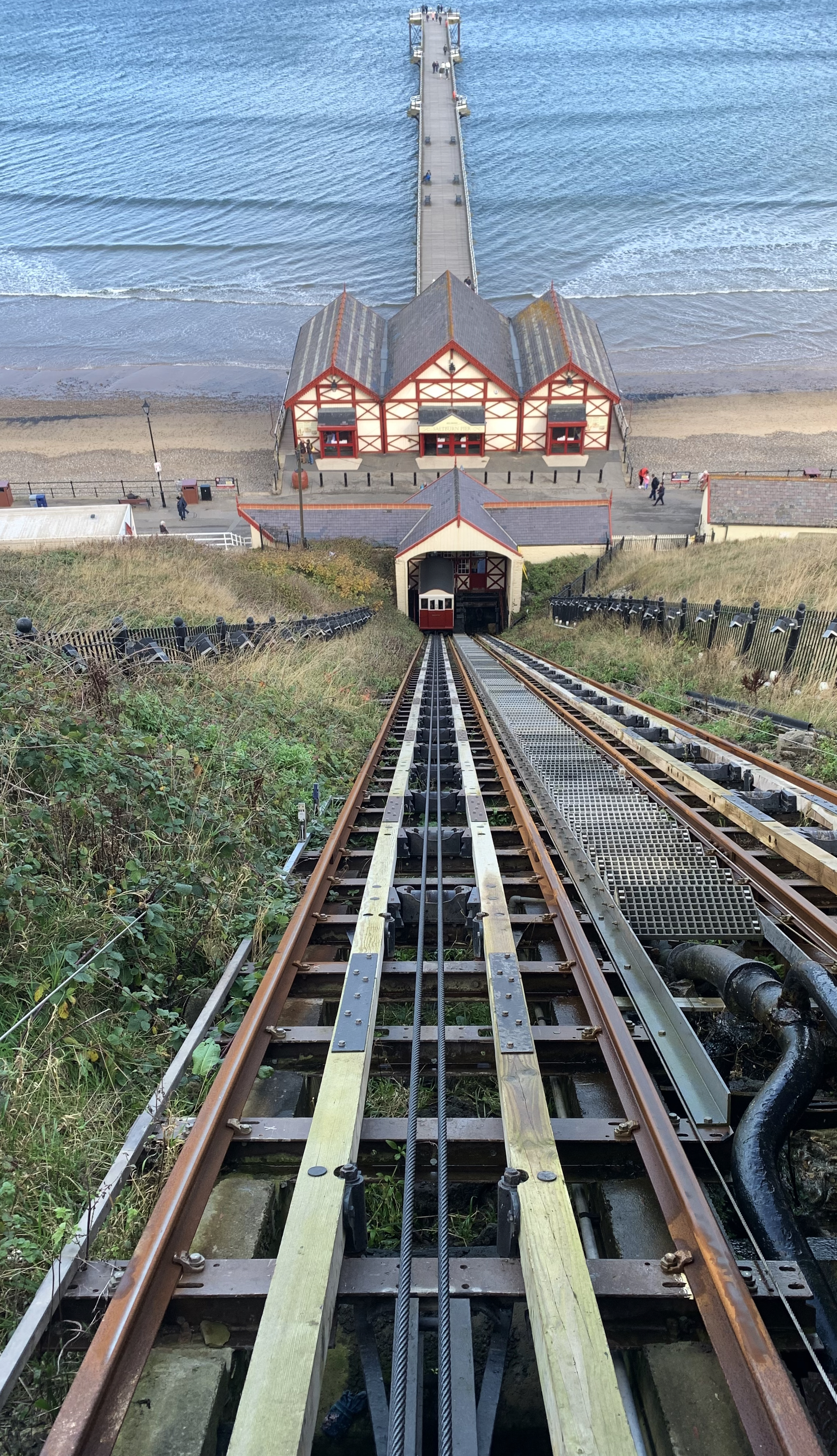
- View from Upper Station

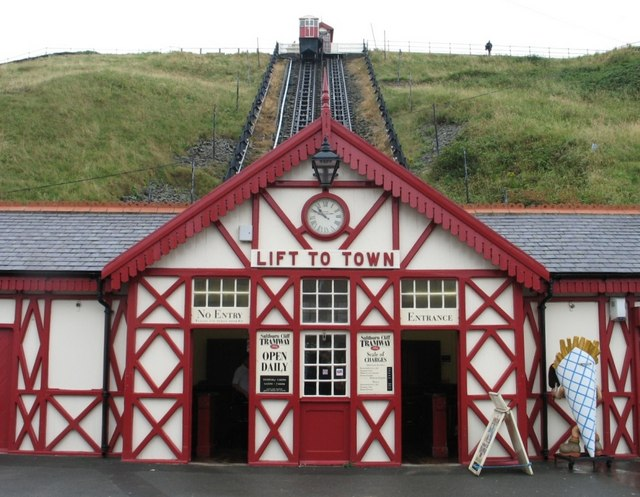
- Lower Station

Overview
- Locale: Saltburn-by-the-Sea, North Yorkshire, England
- Transit type: Funicular railway
- Number of stations: 2

Operation
- Began operation: 28 June 1884
- Operator: Redcar and Cleveland Borough Council

Technical
- System length: 207 feet (63 m)
- Track gauge: Until 1921: 3 ft 9 in (1,143 mm); From 1922: 4 ft 2 1/2 in (1,283 mm)

The Saltburn Cliff Lift is a funicular railway in Saltburn-by-the-Sea, Redcar and Cleveland in the ceremonial county of North Yorkshire, England. It provides access to Saltburn Pier and the seafront from the town. The cliff lift is the oldest operating water-balance cliff funicular in the United Kingdom.

The Lift, constructed between 1883 and 1884, replaced an 1870 vertical cliff hoist. It has a height of 120 feet (37 m) and a track length of 207 feet (63 m), resulting in a 71 per cent incline. A pair of 12-person cars, each fitted with a 240-imperial-gallon (1,100 L; 290 US gal) water tank, run on parallel tracks; by removing or adding the water to their tanks, movement is achieved, regulated by a brakeman at the top.

The original cars have been replaced with aluminium counterparts and the top station restored, but little of the underlying mechanism has been changed since it was installed. Owned since the Second World War by the unitary authority of Redcar and Cleveland and its predecessors, the lift remains in regular use between March and October each year. It is one of Saltburn's most popular tourist attractions. Reportedly, the service was being used by an estimated 150,000 passengers per year by the twenty-first century.

The lift was extensively damaged by fire in January 2024 and reopened in September of the same year.

== Cliff hoist 1870–1883 ==
On 17 August 1861, the Stockton and Darlington Railway arrived in Saltburn from Redcar. Its passenger services prompted considerable growth in the numbers of day trippers and holiday travellers. The boom in tourism stimulated local businesses to capitalise on the new demand, resulting in various new ventures and projects, including Saltburn Pier, which was completed during 1869. Access to the pier from the town via the steep cliff top was relatively difficult and there was a demand for the provision of a better means of reaching it.

The Saltburn Pier Company contracted John Anderson, who had designed the pier, to engineer a solution. He designed the wooden cliff hoist. The hoist, in a tapering lattice timber tower, was moved using water power. A balance tank attached to the wooden lift cage was filled or emptied, For stability, ropes were run inside the tower between the cliff top and beach level.

On 1 July 1870, the cliff hoist was opened, roughly 14 months after the pier. Passengers approached the hoist top via a narrow walkway supported on timber trestles jutting from the cliff face, boarded the cage and descended 120 feet (37 m). Movement was achieved by adding water to its counterbalance tank. To achieve movement in the other direction, water was drained from the tank.

== Cliff lift 1884–present ==
=== Background ===
Following the sale of Saltburn Pier Company to the Middlesbrough Estate in August 1883, the new owners commissioned an inspection of the Cliff Hoist by independent engineers. The inspection led to the structure being condemned because of rotten timbers. The lift had developed a tendency to stop halfway demonstrating its unreliability. It was demolished in late 1883.

The owners commissioned Sir Richard Tangye's company, who had built the earlier Scarborough funiculars, two vertically-inclined water-powered funicular railways, to build a replacement. Tangye appointed the engineer George Croydon Marks as the head of the lift department and he took charge of the design and installation at Saltburn. Marks designed and constructed the funicular with a height of 120 feet (37 m) and a track length of 207 feet (63 m), resulting in a 71 per cent incline.

Elements of the Saltburn Cliff Lift were sourced from multiple companies. Most of the machinery was provided from Tangye, the cars were fabricated by the Birmingham-based rolling stock manufacturer Midland Railway Carriage and Wagon Company, and the gas-powered water pump was produced by Manchester-based engineering firm Crossley Brothers.

=== Design and operational theory ===
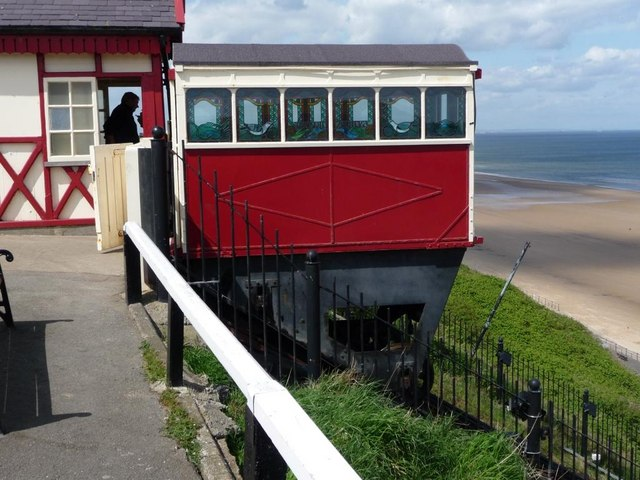
A car at the top station waiting to descend, 2009. Note the presence of the brakeman to the left of the car

As built, the funicular had a pair of 12-person cars, each of which was equipped with a 240-imperial-gallon (1,100 L) water tank. They ran on parallel funicular tracks. Double steel wire ropes were attached to both cars, and the car's movement was controlled by a brakeman at the upper station via an iron winding wheel with double grooves for the running cables and a flange for braking.

The car at the top station has its water tank filled until its mass exceeds the mass of the car at the bottom. Then the car can travel down the incline, counterbalanced by the mass of the other car, which travels to the top; movement is regulated by the brakeman, who controls the speed of travel. When the car reaches the bottom, its water is released, reducing the mass of the lower car, and pumped back to the top. Water is sourced from a nearby spring and stored in a pair of reservoirs, one, capable of storing up to 136,380 litres, is near the lower station, and the other, up to 84,100 litres, is at the cliff top.

=== Operations ===
Saltburn Cliff Lift first opened on Saturday 28 June 1884, but there followed a period of inconsistent operation. The launch of the Cliff Lift may have contributed to the pier company extending the pier.

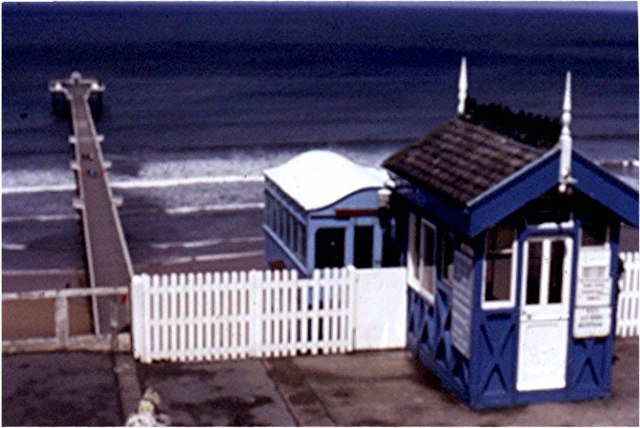
The top in 1979

The original cars, which seated 12 passengers, had stained-glass windows but when the Cliff Lift was refurbished during 1955, the replacement car bodies had plain glass. The aluminium cars introduced during 1979 were modelled on the original design. The stained-glass windows were reinstated in 1991. The wooden bodies of the passenger cars were refurbished and "Victorianised" during 2011 by Stanegate Restorations of Haltwhistle.

The tramway was purchased in 1939 by the Saltburn and Marske-by-the-Sea Urban District Council, who replaced the car bodies in 1955, and it is still owned by the local authority (currently the unitary authority of Redcar and Cleveland Borough Council). Marks' design for the cliff lift was so good that, that beyond routine maintenance and the occasional refurbishment, little of the mechanism has been changed since its installation during 1884. During winter 1921-2, the track gauge was changed from 3' 9" to 4' 2 1/2". In 1924, an AC electrically-operated water pump was installed to replace the 1913 DC generator and pump arrangement, which had earlier replaced the coal gas-fuelled four-cylinder Crossley-built internal combustion engine-driven water pump.

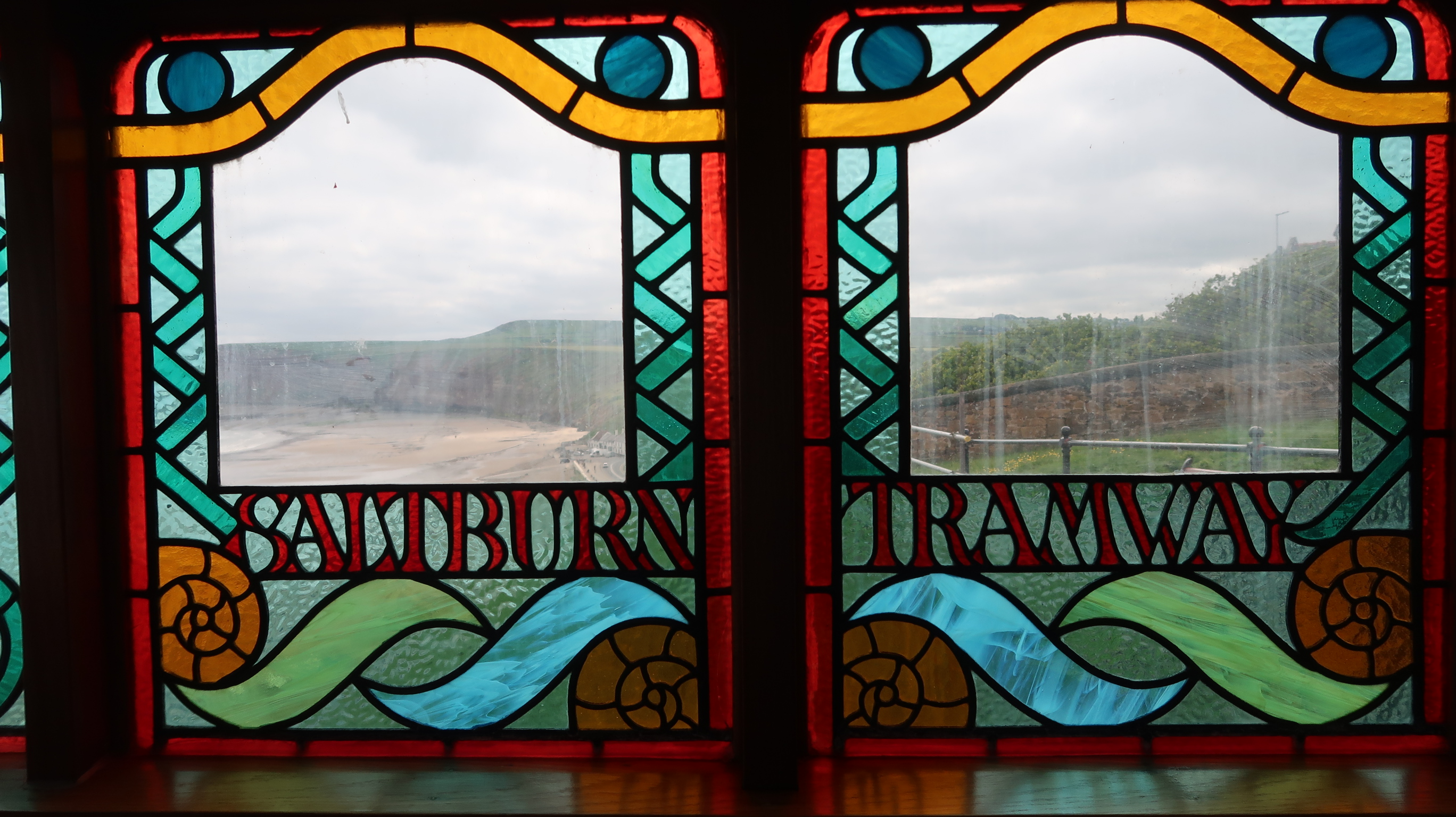
The stained-glass windows were reinstated in 1991

Between 1997 and 1998, the cliff lift was refitted to comply with modern safety standards. During 1998, the main braking wheel was replaced for the first time by a hydraulic braking system to complement the original band braking/driving system. From 19 September 2010 to 11 April 2011, the funicular underwent restoration, reportedly costing around £30,000. In spring 2014, the top station was refurbished and restored it to its original design. During late 2017 and early 2018, the cliff lift was closed for a £500,000 restoration programme following an in-service breakdown; mechanical elements were replaced including all sleepers which were changed to steel to prolong the life along with repairs to the existing sleeper concrete supports, rails, cast iron items which were re-cast at a local foundry from the original components, emergency Scotch Timber braking system along with electric control systems and some lighting. During its refits and restoration, an emphasis has been placed on retaining original parts; where replacement items have been necessary, they have usually been created in the style of their forebears.

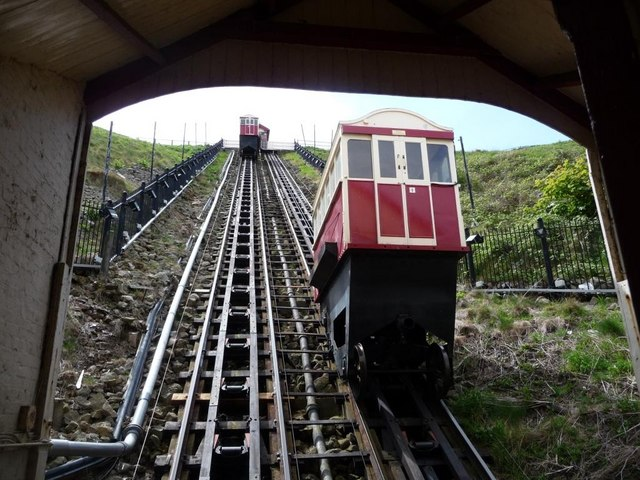
The two cars in the process of moving between the base and top stations

The cliff lift closed in March 2020 due to the COVID-19 pandemic. Despite all Covid restrictions being fully eased across England on 19 July 2021, Redcar and Cleveland Council decided not to reopen the cliff lift for the 2021 season, stating that they decided to keep it closed due to Covid safety fears, instead deciding to use the time to give the cliff lift an overhaul, which meant that tourists would only see the tramcars in action during the maintenance tests. Although initially planned to reopen for Easter 2022, the cliff lift reopening was delayed due to an issue with the safety system found during routine maintenance tests. The lift reopened on 2 June 2022, in time for the Queen's Platinum Jubilee Bank Holiday Weekend.

==== 2024 fire ====
On 15 January 2024 a fire broke out at the lift, starting in an electrical plant room and causing extensive damage. The cliff lift reopened after repair in September 2024.

== See also ==
- List of funicular railways
