= The Naughtiest Girl is a Monitor =

Novel by Enid Blyton

The Naughtiest Girl Is a Monitor
- First edition
- Author: Enid Blyton
- Illustrator: Kenneth Lovell
- Language: English
- Series: The Naughtiest Girl series
- Genre: School
- Publisher: George Newnes Ltd
- Publication date: 1945
- Media type: Print ()
- Pages: 135
- OCLC: 43822982
- Preceded by: The Naughtiest Girl Again
- Followed by: Here's the Naughtiest Girl!

The Naughtiest Girl Is a Monitor is a children's novel by Enid Blyton published in 1945, the third in The Naughtiest Girl series of novels.

== Plot summary ==
Elizabeth has been chosen to be a monitor this coming term. She's getting bored and lonely so Arabella comes to stay. Elizabeth dislikes Arabella a great deal and the dislike is mutual but Elizabeth hides her dislike as best she can, knowing from experience making enemies creates rows and unhappiness. There are four new children that term, Julian, a likeable, lazy, clever chap who bothers to make a model plane that flies beautifully but can't be bothered to learn history dates, Martin, a shifty thief and Rosemary, a timid, spineless girl. Julian suggests Elizabeth makes friends with him because Joan has gone into a higher form. Soon Rosemary complains that she's lost some money and no, she hasn't got a hole in her pocket or purse so Elizabeth marks a coin to catch the thief which soon to Elizabeth looks like Julian. She confronts him about it, they have a quarrel and Julian plays tricks which cause Elizabeth to be unjustly sent outside. When Elizabeth catches Julian stealing biscuits she complains about him, but finds out they were part of the midnight feast menu. She has to step down from being a monitor and a new one is selected. Elizabeth explains everything to William and Rita and Julian tells his side of the story and says that Elizabeth was not misbehaving in class and Elizabeth laughs at his confession, making them friends again. Only the mystery of the nasty thief in the first form is left to uncover.

Half-term is coming. "My mother's not here yet." says Julian "the car must have broken down", but the reason for his mother's lateness is far more sinister; she is very ill. Julian tears out of the school building, with Elizabeth following him. He vows that from then on he will put his brains to good use and not just whenever he wanted to and to come up with tricks. Martin knows how miserable Julian is so he decides to own up to Elizabeth saying that he was the thief. "You thief!" she says "you nasty, rotten, double-faced thief! You should have told the meeting this; not me!" Five minutes later Rosemary comes in and asks "Why are you angry with Martin? He's so generous and kind." and Elizabeth is left scratching her curly head, wondering "How can you be mean and yet generous, kind but yet unkind?" She looks through the big school Book for a case similar to his and reads about a girl called Tessa who behaved almost exactly like Martin. At the weekly Meeting, Martin surprises Elizabeth by owning up to his wrongdoings "Oh" she thinks "he so badly wants people to like him and they don't and now he's had to tell everyone he's been so bad. Pretty brave of him." and she goes over and finds the right page. After knowing the reason why Martin did the things he did, the whole school discussed how they can help him not repeat his wrongdoing again and gave him a chance.

Near the end of the book, Elizabeth and Julian are out on a nature walk. While Julian left Elizabeth to find a special kind of moss, a little child came near the lake she was at and fell in. Elizabeth swims to the child, grabs hold of him in the way she had been taught to and pulls him to shore, with the terrified child nearly drowning her as well. On shore she showed the child's nurse how to do CPR or 'lifesaving work' and he was brought back to life. To reward her for her courageous action, the Meeting decided to make her an honorary monitor for the rest of that term.

== New characters ==
Julian Holland

He is a chap with a 'devil-may-care' attitude. He has a quick brain which he uses to invent jokes and tricks. He is also one of Elizabeth's best friends. He doesn't want to work and achieve academic success at first but in the end he suddenly begins to work harder than ever before. This sudden change is due to his mother recovering from an illness. He has green eyes and black, scruffy hair.

Arabella Buckley

Arabella is an extremely spoiled, extremely rich girl who comes to stay at Elizabeth's during the holidays. Like the Elizabeth of two terms ago, she is not very good at following rules; she keeps a large sum of money for herself even though she knows perfectly well she has to put all her money in the box. Far more spoiled than Elizabeth was before Whyteleafe "cured" her of her naughtiness, Arabella seems to be obsessed with airs and graces and personal appearance.

Martin Follett

Martin is another new pupil at Whyteleafe. His eyes are described as being wide and innocent, but set "a little close together" (one recurring and controversial theme of Blyton is to categorise villains by appearance). He is kind and generous and appears to help when pupils' property goes missing, by giving them money or sweets apparently of his own. But other than for his kindness he is apparently overlooked by the other pupils and does not seem to have any friends.
