= George Newnes =

British politician (1851–1910)

Sir George Newnes Bt.
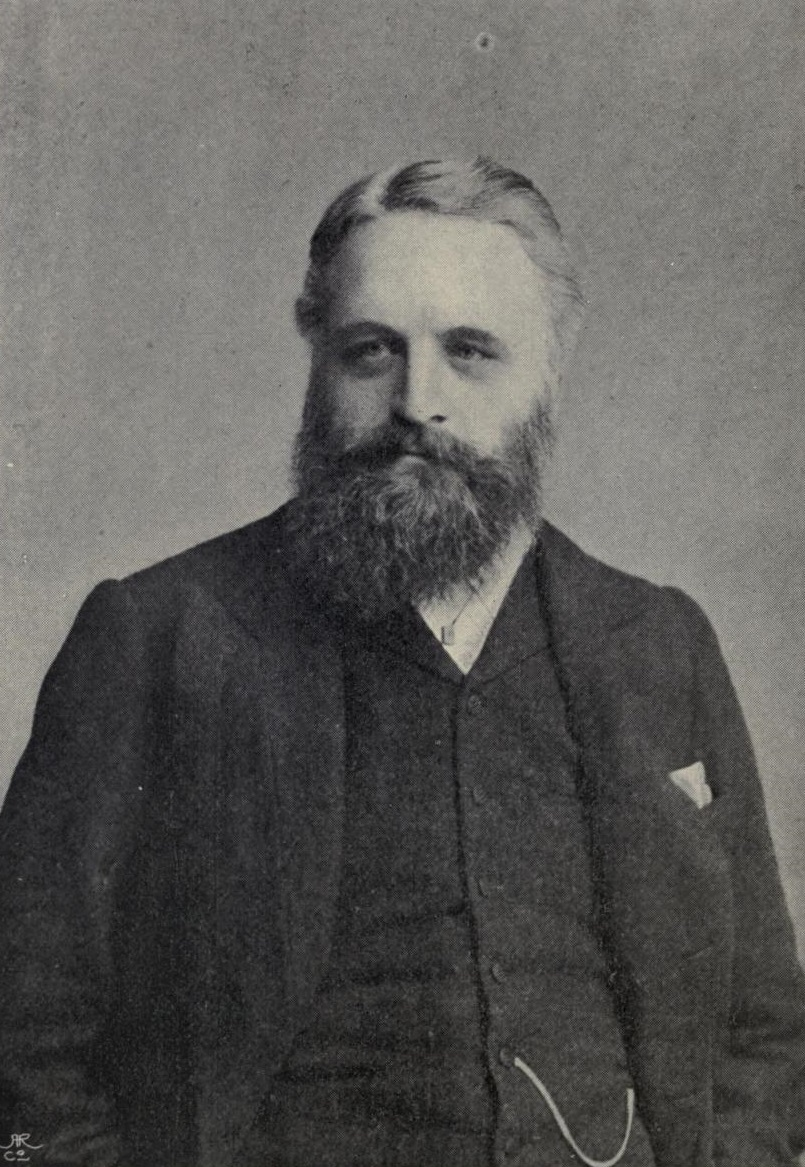
- Newnes, no later than 1897

Member of Parliament, Newmarket
- In office 1885–1895
- Preceded by: N/A
- Succeeded by: Harry McCalmont

Member of Parliament, Swansea
- In office 1900–1910
- Preceded by: John Dillwyn-Llewellyn
- Succeeded by: Alfred Mond

Personal details
- Born: 13 March 1851 Matlock Bath, Derbyshire, England
- Died: 9 June 1910 (aged 59) Lynton, Devon, England
- Party: Liberal
- Spouse: Priscilla Hillyard (m. 1875)
- Children: 2, including Frank Newnes
- Parent: Thomas Mold Newnes
- Education: Silcoates School; City of London School
- Occupation: Newspaper Proprietor, Publisher, Editor & Politician
- Known for: George Newnes Ltd.

Sir George Newnes, 1st Baronet (13 March 1851 – 9 June 1910) was a British publisher and editor and a founding figure in popular journalism. Newnes also served as a Liberal Party Member of Parliament for two decades. His company George Newnes Ltd was known for such periodicals as Tit-Bits and The Strand Magazine; it continued publishing consumer magazines such as Nova long after his death.

== Background and education ==
His father, Thomas Mold Newnes, was a Congregational church minister at the Glenorchy Chapel, Matlock Bath. George Newnes was born in Matlock Bath, Derbyshire, and was educated at Silcoates School and then at Shireland Hall, Warwickshire, and the City of London School. In 1875, he married Priscilla Hillyard. They had two sons; the eldest died at the age of eight (his death was said to have devastated his father), and Frank Newnes (born 1876).

== Career ==
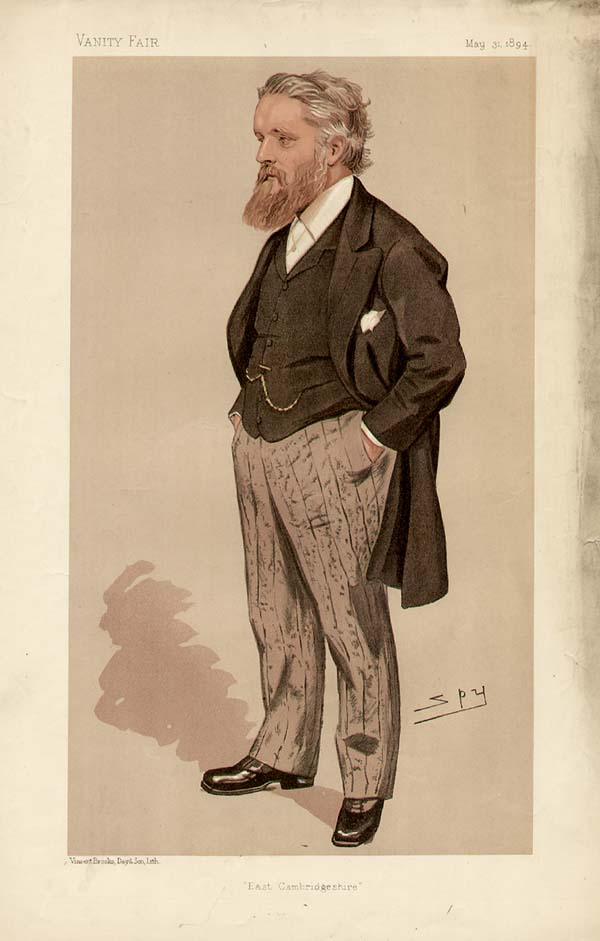
Caricature of George Newnes by Leslie Ward ("Spy") in Vanity Fair magazine, 1894

In 1867, Newnes entered commerce in the "fancy goods" trade, working in London and Manchester. He developed an idea for a new magazine but was unable to obtain financing.

=== Vegetarian Company's Saloon ===
Newnes funded the magazine by opening a vegetarian restaurant in Manchester. Vegetarian restaurants were popular in Manchester at the time. The restaurant was called Vegetarian Company's Saloon. It was considered a success and on its first day in business it sold out of food in 30 minutes. He sold the restaurant to fund a new magazine.

=== Tit-Bits ===
Newnes began his career in publishing in 1881 when he founded Tit-Bits as a direct response to the Elementary Education Act 1870, which introduced education for children aged 5–12 and hence produced a new young generation able to read.

The magazine was initially published in Manchester like a mini-encyclopedia, containing extracts from books and other publications, but principally a diverse range of tit-bits of information presented in an easy-to-read format.

The addition of competitions increased the readership of the periodical, and in 1884 Newnes moved publication to London. He began to work with W. T. Stead, with whom he founded the Review of Reviews in 1890. Tit-Bits reached a circulation of 700,000 by the end of the 19th century. It paved the way for popular journalism – most significantly, the Daily Mail was founded by Alfred Harmsworth, a contributor to Tit-Bits, and the Daily Express was launched by Arthur Pearson, who worked at Tit-Bits for five years after winning a competition to get a job on the magazine.

=== The Strand Magazine ===
Arguably his best-known publication was The Strand Magazine, begun in 1891, in which Sir Arthur Conan Doyle was first able to publish his Sherlock Holmes mystery series. Newnes also founded other magazine titles, including The Wide World Magazine (1888), The Westminster Gazette (1893), and Country Life (1897).

=== Parliamentary career ===
Politically, Newnes was Liberal, and in 1885 he was elected as Member of Parliament (MP) for the newly created constituency of Eastern Cambridgeshire or Newmarket. He held the seat for ten years, before his defeat by the Conservative millionaire horse-breeder, Harry McCalmont in 1895. In addition, Newnes refounded The Westminster Gazette in 1893 to support the Liberal party when The Pall Mall Gazette became a Unionist paper.

He re-entered the Commons in 1900 as MP for Swansea, and held the seat until he retired at the January 1910 general election.

=== Baronetcy ===
In 1895, Newnese was created a baronet "of Wildcroft, in the parish of Putney, in the county of London; of Hollerday Hill, in the parish of Lynton, and Hesketh House, in the borough of Torquay, both in the county of Devon." He paid for the new Putney Library, built in 1899. Around this time, he became the main sponsor of the Southern Cross Expedition to Antarctica; part of his contribution was the purchase of a movie camera from Arthur S. Newman, who would later supply similar cameras to Herbert Ponting of Captain Scott's 1910–13 Terra Nova Expedition and John Baptist Lucius Noel, photographer on the 1924 Mount Everest expedition.

Newnes built a large home called Hollerday House in Lynton, North Devon. It was destroyed by fire in 1913. He played a major part in the development of the twin towns of Lynton and Lynmouth. He built an innovative cliff railway — the Lynton and Lynmouth Cliff Railway — to join the two towns, and also provided the town hall and other amenities. Largely as a result of Sir George's efforts, the 19-mile Lynton and Barnstaple Railway opened in 1898 ostensibly to bring visitors from the mainline railways at Barnstaple. (He was also involved in funding the Bridgnorth Cliff Railway and the Clifton Rocks Railway, as well as the Lynton Village railway station and the Lynmouth Bay railway station.)

Newnes provided a silver cup for the Newnes Trophy series of chess matches between Great Britain and the United States, conducted over transatlantic cable from 1896 to 1911.

Newnes was involved in the creation of The Inambari Para-Rubber Estates, Limited and held 100,000 shares valued at £1 each. His son Frank became a director in the company, which exported rubber collected near the Inambari River in Peru.

He was chairman of the board of directors of Commonwealth Oil Corporation, and the abandoned oil shale mining site of Newnes, in Australia, was named after him.

Sir George Newnes died at his Lynton home in June 1910 aged 59, having suffered ill health from diabetes for some time. He was succeeded in the baronetcy by his son, Frank Newnes, who had served as MP for Bassetlaw, Nottinghamshire from 1906 to 1910.

== Publishing company ==
In 1891, his publishing business was formed into a company that bore his name, George Newnes Ltd. The company was reconstructed in 1897 with a capital of 1,000,000 pounds, and began the publication of books. In 1896, Newnes founded the book series, The Penny Library of Famous Books.

After Newnes' death in 1910, his son Frank Newnes succeeded him as president of George Newnes Ltd. Decades after the proprietor's death, George Newnes Ltd (and its imprint C. Arthur Pearson Ltd) continued into the 1960s as one of London's three leading magazine publishers – along with Odhams Press and the Hulton Press – producing a diverse range of titles from Lady's Companion, Woman's Own, Nova, Rave and Flair, to Practical Mechanics and Practical Television.

In 1959, the company was purchased by Odhams, and in 1961, the company became part of the International Publishing Corporation.

Today, books under the Newnes imprint continue to be published by Elsevier.

== See also ==
- List of British MPs
- List of publishers

== Sources ==
- Jackson, Kate. George Newnes and the New Journalism in Britain, 1880-1910. Aldershot: Ashgate, 2001. ISBN 978-0-7546-0317-7
- Pugh, Brian W., Spiring, Paul R., & Bhanji, Sadru. Arthur Conan Doyle, Sherlock Holmes & Devon. London: MX Publishing Ltd, 2010. ISBN 978-1-904312-86-4
- Welch, Charles (1912). "Newnes, George" . In Lee, Sidney (ed.). Dictionary of National Biography (2nd supplement). London: Smith, Elder & Co.
- Morris, A. J. A. "Newnes, Sir George, first baronet (1851–1910)". Oxford Dictionary of National Biography (online ed.). Oxford University Press. doi:10.1093/ref:odnb/35218. (Subscription, Wikipedia Library access or UK public library membership required.)

Parliament of the United Kingdom
New constituency	Member of Parliament for Newmarket; 1885 – 1895	Succeeded by Harry McCalmont
Preceded by Sir John Dillwyn Llewellyn	Member of Parliament for Swansea; 1900 – Jan. 1910	Succeeded by Sir Alfred Mond
Baronetage of the United Kingdom
New creation	Baronet (of Wildcroft); 1895–1910	Succeeded by Frank Hillyard Newnes
