= Oracle Encyclopædia =

Five-volume general encyclopedia

The Oracle Encyclopædia: Profusely Illustrated, Containing the most accurate information in the most readable form
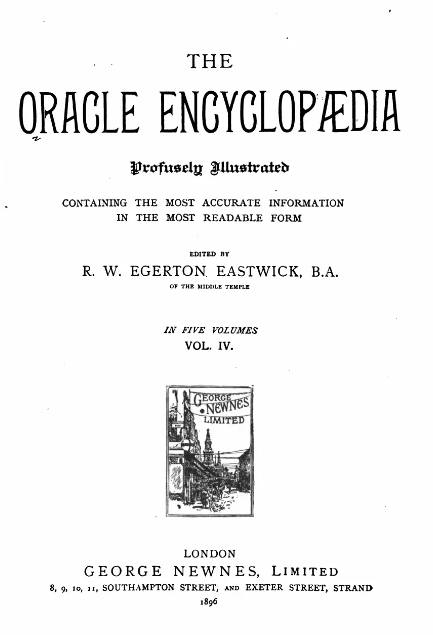
- Title page for The Oracle Encyclopædia (1896)
- Author: R. W. Egerton Eastwick
- Language: English
- Publisher: London: G. Newnes, limited
- Publication date: 1895-1896.
- Media type: Print (hardcover)
- Dewey Decimal: 032
- LC Class: AE5 .O73 1895

The Oracle Encyclopædia: Profusely Illustrated, Containing the most accurate information in the most readable form is a five-volume general encyclopedia. It was published in 1895 in London by George Newnes Ltd and edited by R. W. Egerton Eastwick.
