= The Adventurous Four =

Story series by Enid Blyton

The Adventurous Four is a series of two novels and one short story written by Enid Blyton. The first book was published in 1941 during wartime. The stories revolve around twins Jill and Mary, their elder brother Tom and their fisher friend Andy. The characters are from World War II England while the stories were set in Scotland.

First edition (publ. George Newnes Ltd) Illustrated by E. H. Davie

== Modern versions ==
In the modern versions, editors have changed the girls' names to Pippa and Zoe. The books were re-titled in 1998 as The Adventurous Four Shipwrecked! and The Adventurous Four Stranded!. The short story originally appeared in the 1952 collection called "Enid Blyton's Omnibus!", which published new stories from five of Enid Blyton's well-known series, and the Adventurous Four story in it is "Off With the Adventurous Four!"; this was expanded by Clive Dickinson to form a third novel, The Adventurous Four Trapped!.E.H. Davie and Jessie Land illustrated the two original books.

== The Adventurous Four (1941) – Modern Name: The Adventurous Four Shipwrecked! ==
When Tom, Jill and Mary go to stay at a little fishing village in Scotland, the local fisherman's lad, Andy, promises to take them out in his boat. But a storm takes them off course and they end up shipwrecked on a small group of islands. Worse, it seems the islands are being used as a secret submarine base by the enemy. The story is set in World War II and revolves around a potential dangerous enemy base that could attack Britain at any time. First edition: 1941 Publisher: George Newnes Illustrator: E.H. Davie Category: Adventurous Four Genre: Mystery/Adventure Type: Novels/Novelettes The book has had 11 reprints since 1941:

1. 1962 Armada, illustrations and cover by Dorothy Brook
2. 1967 Merlin, illustrations and cover by Clyde Pearson
3. 1971 Armada, illustrations by Dorothy Brook, cover uncredited
4. 1972 Dean, illustrations and cover uncredited
5. 1980 Beaver, illustrations by Trevor Parkin, cover by David Barnett
6. 1984 Dean, illustrations and cover uncredited (*)
7. 1986 Beaver, illustrations by Trevor Parkin, cover by Josep Maria Miralles
8. 1987 Dean, illustrations and cover uncredited
9. 1994 Dean, illustrations uncredited, cover by David Kearney
10. 1998 Collins, not illustrated, cover by Katie Vandyck
11. 2003 Award, illustrations and cover by Gavin Rowe

== Modern Name: The Adventurous Four STRANDED! ==
When Pippa, Zoe and Tom are on holiday in Scotland their friend Andy takes them on a sailing trip to the Cliff of Birds; they are unaware that the cliff hides a deadly secret, in the form of gun runners. First edition: 1947 Publisher: George Newnes Illustrator: Jessie Land Category: Adventurous Four Genre: Mystery/Adventure Type: Novels/Novelettes The book has had 11 reprints since 1947:

1. 1962 Armada, illustrations and cover by Dorothy Brook
2. 1968 Merlin, illustrations and cover by Clyde Pearson
3. 1971 Armada, illustrations by Dorothy Brook, cover uncredited
4. 1973 Dean, illustrations and cover uncredited
5. 1980 Beaver, illustrations by Trevor Parkin, cover by David Barnett
6. 1984 Dean, illustrations and cover uncredited
7. 1986 Beaver, illustrations by Trevor Parkin, cover Josep Maria Miralles
8. 1987 Dean, illustrations and cover uncredited
9. 1994 Dean, illustrations uncredited, cover by David Kearney
10. 1998 Collins, not illustrated, cover by Katie Vandyck
11. 2003 Award, illustrations and cover by Gavin Rowe

== Off With the Adventurous Four! (Short story) (1952 - originally in collection "Enid Blyton's Omnibus!") – Modern Name: The Adventurous Four Trapped! ==
"Off With the Adventurous Four!" is a short story from the Adventurous Four series which was extended in 1998 by Clive Dickinson to a full-fledged novel named The Adventurous Four Trapped!

The book has had one reprint since 1998:

1. 2003 Award, illustrations and cover by Gavin Rowe
