= Anne Digby =

British children's writer

- Born: 5 May 1943 (age 83); Kingston upon Thames, Surrey, England
- Occupation: Writer
- Writing career
- Genre: Children's fiction
- Notable work: Trebizon (school stories)

Anne Digby (born 5 May 1943 in Kingston upon Thames, Surrey) is a prolific British children's writer best known for the Trebizon series published between 1978 and 1994. The name is a pen name.

Digby attended North London Collegiate School before becoming a magazine journalist, and lived in Paris for a while. As a journalist, she wrote for School Friend and Girl. She then worked as a press officer for Oxfam in Oxford. Her first novel was A Horse Called September (1975). From 1978 to 1994 she wrote fourteen school story novels set in the fictional Cornish boarding school Trebizon. She has also written the Me, Jill Robinson series of books, the Jug Valley Juniors series, Quicksilver Horse and The Big Swim of the Summer. She added six books to Enid Blyton's 1940–52 Naughtiest Girl series, 1999 to 2001 – which publisher Hachette catalogues as Naughtiest Girl, volumes 5 to 10 – and created the Three R Detective books for younger readers.

The Encyclopaedia of Girls' School Stories says that Digby "may take some credit" for the revival of girls' schools stories in the twenty-first century. The Encyclopaedia notes that Digby's style becomes "heavily teen mag" in her later books.

Fidra Books has published a collector's edition of Fifth Year Friendships at Trebizon, which has a foreword by Digby, while new mass-market paperback editions of the first ten titles in the Trebizon series were published by Egmont Books in 2016 and 2017.

She lived in Dorset for years but, as of 2020, lives in East Sussex. She is married with four children.
