= Trebizon =

Series of school story novels by Anne Digby

Trebizon is a series of school story novels by Anne Digby set in a fictional school of that name. The fourteen novels were published between 1978 and 1994 and the first ten books were reprinted in 2016 and 2017. Like Enid Blyton's earlier creation, Malory Towers, Trebizon is in Cornwall.

The novels follow the protagonist Rebecca Mason from when she joins the school in the second form through to the end of her fifth year. A theme throughout the series is Rebecca's talent for tennis. Other characters include Rebecca's two best friends, Tish Anderson and Susan Murdoch, and her other friend Robbie Anderson.

The Encyclopaedia of Girls' School Stories describes the books as "extremely popular", "modern" but in the tradition of girls' school stories and as selling well. The Encyclopaedia notes that Trebizon is the longest school story series published since the 1960s.

The series has been reprinted by Egmont Books, with illustrations by Lucy Truman. The books have been translated into several languages, including Japanese.

== Series details ==
Book	Title	Publisher	Date	ISBN
1	First Term at Trebizon	W. H. Allen	October 1978	ISBN 0-491-02007-4
2	Second Term at Trebizon	W. H. Allen	February 1979	ISBN 0-491-02327-8
3	Summer Term at Trebizon	W. H. Allen	August 1979	ISBN 0-491-02378-2
4	Boy Trouble at Trebizon	Granada	August 1980	ISBN 0-246-11421-5
5	More Trouble at Trebizon	Granada	March 1981	ISBN 0-246-11425-8
6	The Tennis Term at Trebizon	Granada	January 1982	ISBN 0-246-11423-1
7	Summer Camp at Trebizon	Granada	June 1982	ISBN 0-246-11764-8
8	Into the Fourth at Trebizon	Granada	November 1982	ISBN 0-246-11866-0
9	The Hockey Term at Trebizon	Granada	February 1984	ISBN 0-246-11867-9
10	Fourth Year Triumphs at Trebizon	Granada	October 1985	ISBN 0-246-11868-7
11	The Ghostly Term at Trebizon	Puffin	February 1990	ISBN 0-14-034274-5
12	Fifth Year Friendships at Trebizon	Puffin	June 1990	ISBN 0-14-034275-3
13	Secret Letters at Trebizon	Straw Hat	January 1993	ISBN 0-9520571-0-7
14	The Unforgettable Fifth at Trebizon	Straw Hat	May 1994	ISBN 0-9520571-7-4

== Characters ==
- Rebecca Mason
- Ishbel "Tish" Anderson
- Mara Leonodis
- Susan Murdoch
- Margot Lawrence
- Laura Wilkins
- Sally Elphinstone
- Lucy Hubbard
- Robbie Anderson
- Margaret Exton
- Josselyn Vining
- Roberta Jones
- Cliff
- Pippa Walkers
- Mrs Barrington
