= Newnes baronets =

Extinct baronetcy in the Baronetage of the United Kingdom

- Escutcheon of the Newnes baronets of Wildcroft, Hollerday Hill and Hesketh House
- Creation date: 1895
- Status: extinct
- Extinction date: 1955
- Motto: Festina prudenter, Hasten prudently

The Newnes Baronetcy, of Wildcroft in the Parish of Putney in the County of London; of Hollerday Hill in the Parish of Lynton, and of Hesketh House in the Borough of Torquay, both in the County of Devon, was a title in the Baronetage of the United Kingdom. It was created on 15 February 1895 for the publisher, editor and politician George Newnes. He was succeeded by his son, the second Baronet. He sat as member of parliament for Bassetlaw. The title became extinct on his death in 1955.

== Newnes baronets, of Wildcroft, Hollerday Hill and Hesketh House (1895) ==
- Sir George Newnes, 1st Baronet (1851–1910)
- Sir Frank Hillyard Newnes, 2nd Baronet (1876–1955)

Baronetage of the United Kingdom
Preceded by Barran baronets	Newnes baronets of Wildcroft, Hollerday Hill and Hesketh House; 15 February 1895	Succeeded by Erichsen baronets
