= Frank Newnes =

British publisher, businessman and Liberal politician

Sir Frank Newnes 2nd Baronet
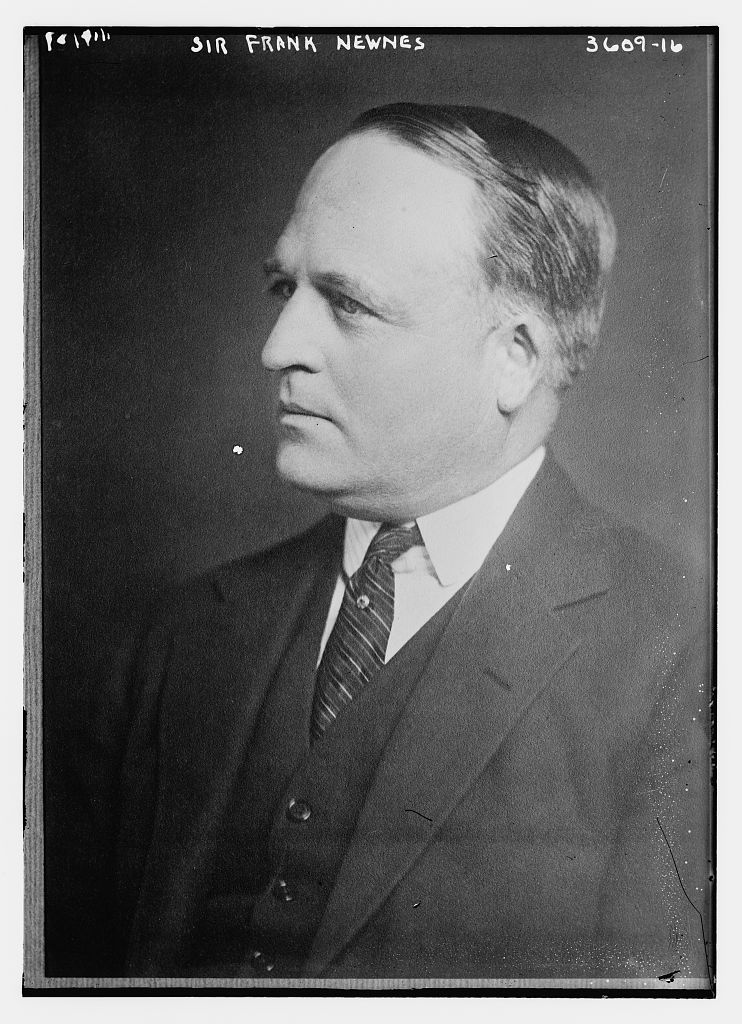
- Sir Frank Newnes, 2nd Baronet

Member of Parliament, Bassetlaw
- In office 1906 – January 1910
- Preceded by: Frederick Milner
- Succeeded by: Ellis Hume-Williams

Personal details
- Born: 27 September 1876 Manchester, England
- Died: 10 July 1955 (aged 78) Western Australia
- Party: Liberal
- Spouses: Emmeline (Lena) Augusta Louisa (m. 1913; died 1939) Dorothy Darlot (m. 1946)
- Parent(s): George Newnes and Priscilla Newnes (née Hillyard)
- Education: Clare College, Cambridge (1897)
- Occupation: Publisher, Businessman, Politician
- Known for: George Newnes Ltd. Country Life, Ltd; The Westminster Gazette

Sir Frank Hillyard Newnes, 2nd Baronet (28 September 1876 – 10 July 1955) was a British publisher, businessman and Liberal politician.

== Family and education ==
Frank Hillyard Newnes was born in Manchester, the son of George Newnes, the newspaper publisher and Liberal MP first for Newmarket and later for Swansea. His mother was Priscilla Newnes (née Hillyard) the daughter of the Reverend James Hillyard. He had an older brother who died aged eight years and whose death was said to have devastated his father. Newnes was educated privately before attending Clare College, Cambridge where he graduated with MA and LL.B. degrees in 1897.

In 1913 Newnes married Emmeline Augusta Louisa (Lena), the daughter of the late Sir Albert de Rutzen, who had held the office of Chief Metropolitan Magistrate at Bow Street. Lena Newnes became a well-known society hostess and philanthropist, raising thousands of pounds for various charitable and educational causes. She was a Dame of Grace of the Order of St John of Jerusalem. She died in 1939.

Newnes married again in 1946. His second wife was Dorothy (née Darlot), the widow of Stephen Delmar-Morgan, who was originally from Perth, Western Australia. There were no children from either marriage.

== Career ==
On leaving university in 1897, Newnes followed his father into his publishing business, eventually becoming President of George Newnes Ltd. He also became Chairman of Country Life, Ltd and a director of other companies in the publishing trade, including The Westminster Gazette, the Liberal-supporting newspaper founded by his father. The paper was dubbed the "pea-green incorruptible" – Prime Minister William Ewart Gladstone having personally approved its green colour. The firm was based at 17-21 Tavistock Street in premises leased from the eleventh Duke of Bedford.

Newnes also had other commercial and investment interests, and served on the boards of the Norwich Union Fire Insurance Society and Norwich Union Life Insurance Society. He also served as a director of City & Commercial Investment Trusts Ltd and Redeemable Securities Trust Ltd and was Chairman of Associated Weavers, Ltd and Armoride Ltd. In addition to his business career, Newnes was called to the Bar by the Inner Temple in 1898, although it is not recorded that he ever practised the law. In 1907, he became a director of The Inambari Para-Rubber Estates, Limited, a joint stock company that exported rubber from the Inambari River in Peru.

== Politics ==
Newnes also followed his father in his political persuasions. A sometime member of the National Liberal Council, he was elected Liberal MP for Bassetlaw in north Nottinghamshire at the 1906 general election, gaining the seat from the Conservatives by a majority of 531 votes. However, the seat returned to the Tories at the January 1910 election by the even narrower margin of 341 votes. He did not stand for Parliament again. However his father died in 1910 and Newnes inherited the baronetcy.

== War service ==
In 1915, during World War I, Newnes was commissioned a sub-lieutenant in the Royal Naval Volunteer Reserve. Two years later he transferred to the army and attained the rank of Captain in the 12th Battalion, the Bedfordshire and Hertfordshire Regiment.

== Public and charity appointments ==
Newnes’ main non-political interests were in public health matters and he also understandably busied himself with press-related charities. He was a member of the Voluntary Hospitals Committee for London, a member of the management committees of the Royal Free Hospital and its Medical School and also served as Chairman of the Post-Graduate Institute of Dental Surgery and of the Eastman Dental Hospital. In his publishing charity work, Newnes became President of the Printers Pension Corporation and was a vice-president of the Periodical Proprietors Association. In 1949 he was appointed a Commander of the Order of St John.

== Death ==
Newnes died in Western Australia on 10 July 1955 at the age of 78 years. As he had no children the Newnes baronetcy became extinct on his death.

== See also ==
- Frank Newnes Glacier

Parliament of the United Kingdom
Preceded by Frederick Milner	Member of Parliament for Bassetlaw; 1906 – Jan 1910	Succeeded by Sir Ellis Hume-Williams, 1st Baronet
Baronetage of the United Kingdom
Preceded by George Newnes	Baronet (of Wildcroft, Hollerday Hill and Hesketh House); 1910–1955	Extinct
