= Practical Television =

- Editor: F.J. Camm
- Categories: Television
- Frequency: Monthly
- Publisher: George Newnes Ltd
- Founded: 1933
- First issue: September 1934
- Final issue Number: May 2008; At least 660
- Country: United Kingdom
- Language: English

Practical Television, later known as Television and subsequently Television & Consumer Electronics, was a UK magazine for the electronics/TV servicing trade, enthusiasts, and the general public. The chief editor was F.J. Camm and it was published by George Newnes Ltd. Initially founded as a supplement to another publication in 1933, it was published as a monthly magazine from 1934 to 1938, and from 1950 to June 2008.

== Publication history ==
Practical Television first appeared in September 1933, initially as a four-page monthly supplement to Practical Wireless (launched 1932); it became a weekly supplement starting in January 1934.

Practical Television debuted as a separate, monthly publication in September 1934. In November 1938 it was merged back into Practical Wireless as a supplement, and in 1940 it disappeared from that publication as well.

After a nine-year hiatus, in March 1949, Practical Television restarted as a supplement in Practical Wireless. The magazine reappeared as a separate publication in April 1950, starting with a new issue No. 1.

With the October 1970 issue, the title was shortened to Television with the subtitle "Servicing, Construction, Colour Developments." By mid-2004 the magazine was called Television & Consumer Electronics.

After changes of ownership, the magazine was finally withdrawn from publication in June 2008; its final issue was June 2008.
