= George Newnes Ltd =

British publisher

- Parent company: Odhams Press (1960–1961); International Publishing Company (1961–1970); Reed International (1970–1992); Elsevier/RELX (1992–present)
- Founded: 1891; 135 years ago
- Founder: George Newnes
- Country of origin: England
- Headquarters location: 8–11 Southampton Street, London
- Key people: W. T. Stead, C. Arthur Pearson, Neville Pearson, Frank Newnes, Hedley Le Bas, Sydney Horler, Ida Pollock, Malcolm Saville, R. J. Minney, Frederick James Camm
- Publication types: Periodicals, books
- Nonfiction topics: News, popular culture, economics, technology
- Imprints: C. Arthur Pearson (c. 1914–1959)

George Newnes Ltd is a British publisher. The company was founded in 1891 by George Newnes (1851–1910), considered a founding father of popular journalism. Newnes published such magazines and periodicals as Tit-Bits, The Wide World Magazine, The Captain, The Strand Magazine, The Grand Magazine, John O'London's Weekly, Sunny Stories for Little Folk, Woman's Own, and the "Practical" line of magazines overseen by editor Frederick J. Camm. Long after the founder's death, Newnes was known for publishing ground-breaking consumer magazines such as Nova.

Newnes published books by such authors as Enid Blyton, Hall Caine, Richmal Crompton, Sir Arthur Conan Doyle, George Goodchild, W. E. Johns, P. G. Wodehouse, and John Wyndham.

Initially an independent publisher, Newnes became an imprint of the International Publishing Company in 1961. Today, books under the Newnes imprint continue to be published by Elsevier.

== History ==
=== Origins ===
Founder George Newnes began his career in publishing in 1881 when he founded Tit-Bits as a direct response to the Elementary Education Act 1870 which introduced education for children aged 5–12 and hence produced a new young generation able to read. The magazine was initially published in Manchester like a mini-encyclopedia, containing extracts from books and other publications, but principally a diverse range of tit-bits of information presented in an easy-to-read format. He funded the magazine by opening a vegetarian restaurant in Manchester. The addition of competitions increased the readership of the periodical, and in 1884 Newnes moved publication to London. Tit-Bits reached a circulation of 700,000 by the end of the 19th century. It paved the way for popular journalism; most significantly, the Daily Mail was founded by Alfred Harmsworth, a contributor to Tit-Bits, and the Daily Express was launched by Arthur Pearson, who worked at Tit-Bits for five years after winning a competition to get a job on the magazine.

Newnes began to work with W. T. Stead, with whom he founded the Review of Reviews in 1890.

=== Formation and growth of George Newnes Ltd. ===
In 1891 his publishing business was formed into George Newnes Ltd. Arguably Newnes' best-known publication was The Strand Magazine, begun in 1891, in which Sir Arthur Conan Doyle was first able to publish his Sherlock Holmes mystery series. Newnes also founded other magazine titles, including The Wide World Magazine (1888), The Westminster Gazette (1893), and Country Life (1897).

In 1896, Newnes began the publication of books, founding the book series The Penny Library of Famous Books. Other book series published would include Newnes' Sixpenny Novels Illustrated, Newnes' Sixpenny Copyright Novels, and The Library of Useful Stories. The company was reconstructed in 1897 with a capital of one million pounds.

George Newnes died in 1910; his son Frank (1876–1955), who had followed his father into his publishing business, became President of George Newnes Ltd.

In the period 1932–1934, Newnes editor Frederick James Camm launched a "Practical" line of magazines that included Practical Mechanics, Practical Motorist, Practical Television, and Practical Wireless. These titles became known as "Camm's Comics".

An example of a home economics book published by Newnes is Housekeeping Made Easy: a Handbook of Household Management Appealing Chiefly to the Middle-Class Housekeeper, by Edith Waldemar Leverton [c. 1910]; a more comprehensive manual called Home Management was edited by Alison Barnes and published in the 1950s in two volumes.

Newnes took over publication of Chambers's Encyclopaedia in the period 1950–1966, putting out four new editions.

=== C. Arthur Pearson ===
Newnes retained a cooperative relationship with former employee and fellow publisher Arthur Pearson (1866–1921), and by 1914, C. Arthur Pearson Ltd. (founded in 1890) had essentially become an imprint of Newnes. With Pearson's death in 1921, this arrangement was formalized, and in 1929 Newnes purchased all outstanding shares of Pearson's company. The Pearson imprint focused mostly on magazines from the 1930s through the 1950s, known for ongoing titles like Home Notes and London Opinion, as well as Men Only. Notable comics titles published by Pearson in the 1950s and early 1960s included the romance comics Mirabelle, The New Glamour, and Marty; and the Picture Stories and Picture Library series.

=== Leading magazine publisher ===
Decades after the proprietor's death, Newnes/Pearson continued into the 1960s as one of London's three leading magazine publishers – along with Odhams Press and the Hulton Press – producing a diverse range of titles from Lady's Companion, Woman's Own, Nova, Rave and Flair, to Practical Mechanics and Practical Television.

=== Sale to Odhams, IPC, Elsevier ===
In 1959, the company was purchased by Odhams Press, and in 1961, the company became part of the International Publishing Corporation. Further sales, in 1970 to Reed International, and a 1992 merger with Dutch science publisher Elsevier NV, left Newnes part of Reed Elsevier (now RELX Group).

Newnes, with offices in Oxford and Boston, is now recognized as a leading publisher of electronics and electrical engineering books.

== Notable publications ==
=== Periodicals ===
- The Captain (1899–1924)
- Country Life (1897–1905; continued by Edward Hudson)
- Fantasy (1938–1939)
- The Grand Magazine (1905–1940)
- John O'London's Weekly (1919–1954)
- The Magazine of Fine Arts (1905-1907)
- The Navy and Army Illustrated (1895–1915)
- Nova (1965–1975)
- Practical Mechanics (1933–1963)
- Practical Motorist (1934–1940; later continued by other publishers)
- Practical Television (1934–2008) — began as a supplement to Practical Wireless; became an independent publication in 1950
- Practical Wireless (1932; continued by other publishers)
- Radio Times (1923–1937; continued by the British Broadcasting Company)
- The Strand Magazine (1891–1950)
- Sunny Stories for Little Folk (1926–1954) — renamed Enid Blyton's Sunny Stories in 1937
- Tit-Bits (1881–1984)
- The Wide World Magazine (1888–1965)
- Woman's Own (1932; continued by other publishers)
- Woman's Life (1895–1934) – the first women's weekly magazine

=== Newspapers ===
- The Westminster Gazette (1893–1908; continued by other publishers until 1928)

=== Books ===
- Enid Blyton books:
  - Book of Brownies (1926)
  - The Enchanted Wood (1939)
  - The Naughtiest Girl in the School (1940)
  - The Adventurous Four (1941)
  - The Magic Faraway Tree (1943)
  - The Naughtiest Girl is a Monitor (1945)
  - The Folk of the Faraway Tree (1946)
- Caxton Series (1901–1904)
- Chambers's Encyclopaedia (1944–1966)
- Arthur Conan Doyle Sherlock Holmes novels:
  - The Adventures of Sherlock Holmes (1892)
  - The Memoirs of Sherlock Holmes (1893 [1894])
  - The Hound of the Baskervilles (1902)
  - The Return of Sherlock Holmes (1905)
- The First Men in the Moon by H. G. Wells (1901)
- Richmal Crompton Just William series (1922–1970)
- Leach's Sixpenny Cookery Series
- The Library of Useful Stories (1897–1914)
- John O'London's Library (1934–1938)
- John O' London's Little Books (1924–1932)
- Oracle Encyclopædia (1895–1896)
- The Penny Library of Famous Books series (1896–1899)
- Thin Paper Classics (1901–1907)
- P. G. Wodehouse books:
  - Love Among the Chickens (1906)
  - My Man Jeeves (1919)
- John Wyndham books:
  - Foul Play Suspected (1935)
  - The Secret People (1935)
