= Practical Wireless =

British amateur radio magazine

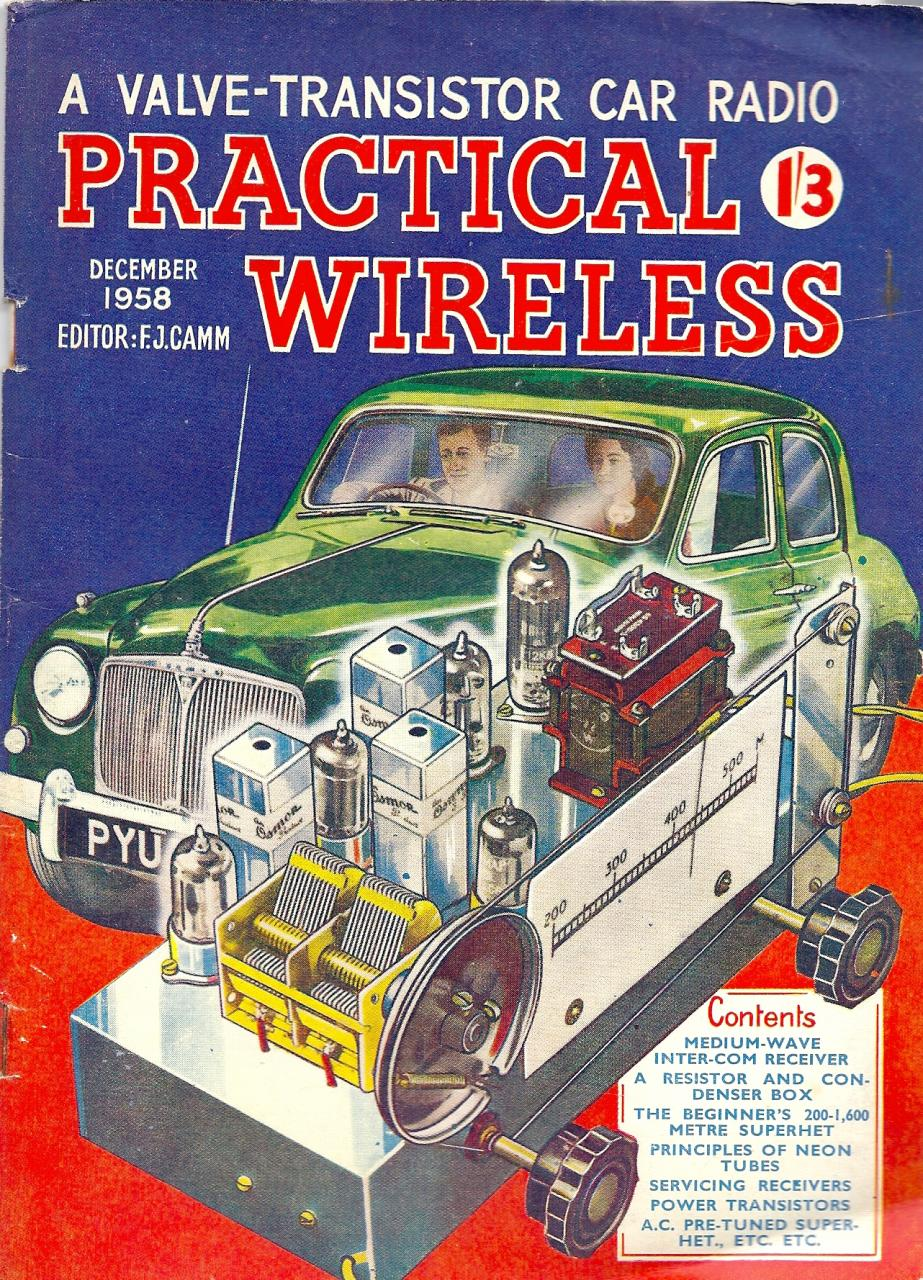
- December 1958 Issue
- Editor: Don Field G3XTT
- Former editors: F.J. Camm (1932–1959)
- Categories: Amateur radio
- Frequency: Monthly
- Publisher: George Newnes Ltd (1932–?); PW Publishing Limited (?–2017); Warners Group Publications plc (2017–present)
- Founded: 1932
- Country: United Kingdom
- Language: English
- Website: www.radioenthusiast.co.uk
- ISSN: 0141-0857

Practical Wireless is a British amateur radio magazine, published monthly by Warners Group Publications.

== History and profile ==
The magazine was founded in 1932 (as a supplement to Hobbies magazine) by F.J. Camm of George Newnes Publishers. It became an independent weekly in that year, then monthly in 1940 (due to wartime paper shortages). Camm was editor until his death in 1959: it was often referred to affectionately as one of "Camm's comics." Practical Television was a supplement to the magazine for a short while before the war and became a separate publication in 1950.

Clive Sinclair was a freelance contributor who wrote articles for Practical Wireless since his school days. His company, Sinclair Radionics, also advertised their products extensively in the magazine.

The magazine mainly covered topics such as constructing radio circuits, but also related subjects such as electronics, instruments and audio.

From the November 1980 issue, Practical Wireless became dedicated entirely to amateur radio.

In August 2017, upon retirement of previous owners Roger Hall and Steve Hunt, Practical Wireless along with sister magazine Radio User, were sold to Warners Group Publications, a Lincolnshire-based publishing company that specializes in producing hobby-related magazines, websites and events.
