= Lynton and Lynmouth Cliff Railway =

Water-powered funicular railway in England

Coordinates: 51°13′53″N 3°50′04″W

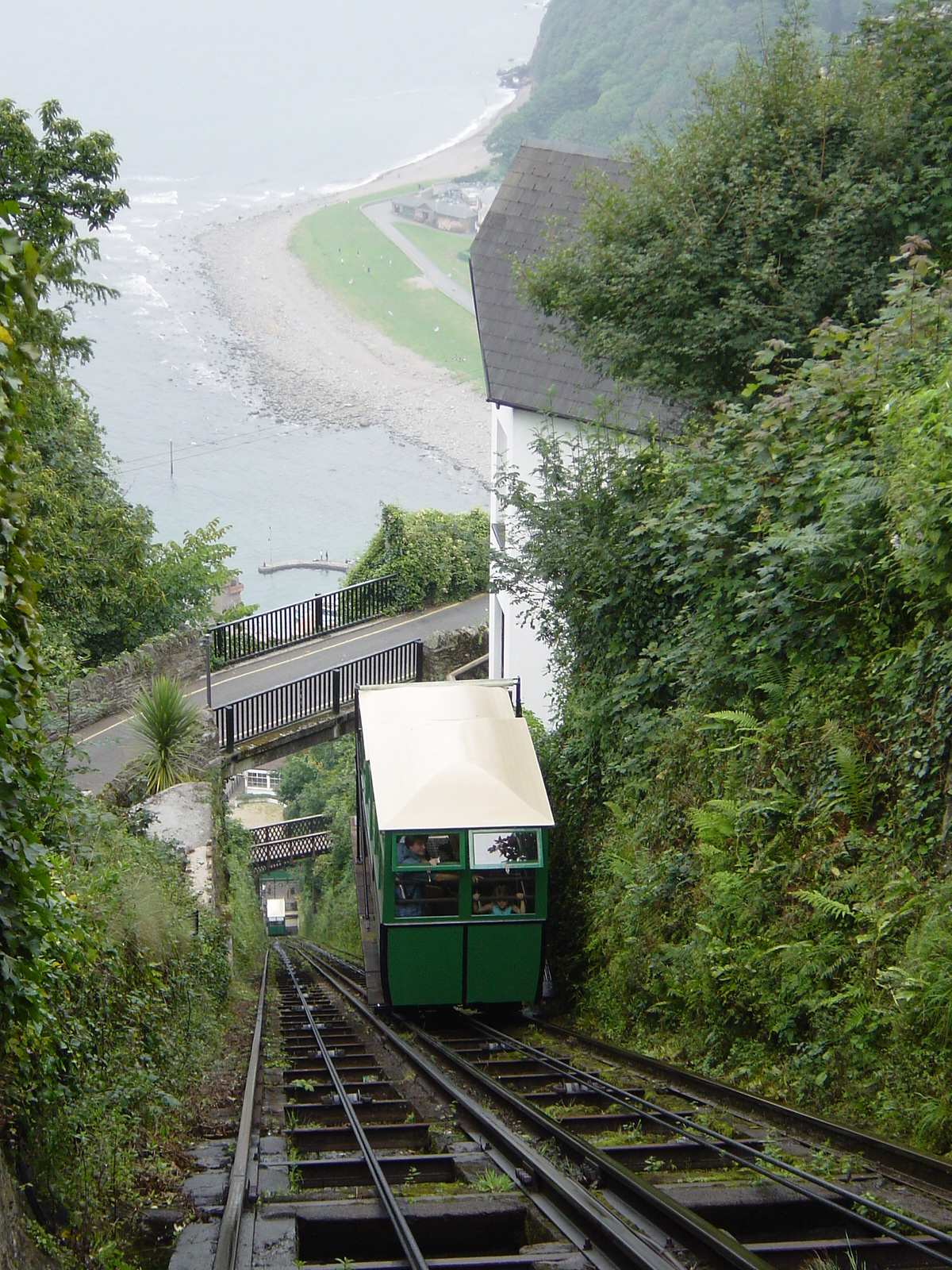
Lynton and Lynmouth Cliff Railway in 2006

The Lynton and Lynmouth Cliff Railway is a water-powered funicular railway joining the twin towns of Lynton and Lynmouth on the rugged coast of North Devon in southwest England.

Lynton and Lynmouth are separated by a high cliff, making it hard for people and goods to move between them. In the late 19th century, interest arose in building a funicular or cliff lift to join them. The civil engineer George Croydon Marks played a key role in both its design and bringing in financing from his business partner, Sir George Newnes. Local contractor Robert Jones was involved in designing the funicular's innovative braking system and the line's construction and maintenance in the first decades of its operation.

In 1887, construction commenced and a year later, an act of Parliament authorised the Lynmouth and Lynton Lift Company to operate it. The completed railway was opened on Easter Monday 1890; it has been in continuous use since. While early use was largely focused on moving freight, the funicular railway became popular with tourists and it became mostly used for passenger travel. Its flat platforms were converted into passenger carriages in 1947. It is the world's highest and steepest water-powered cliff railway in operation.

== History ==
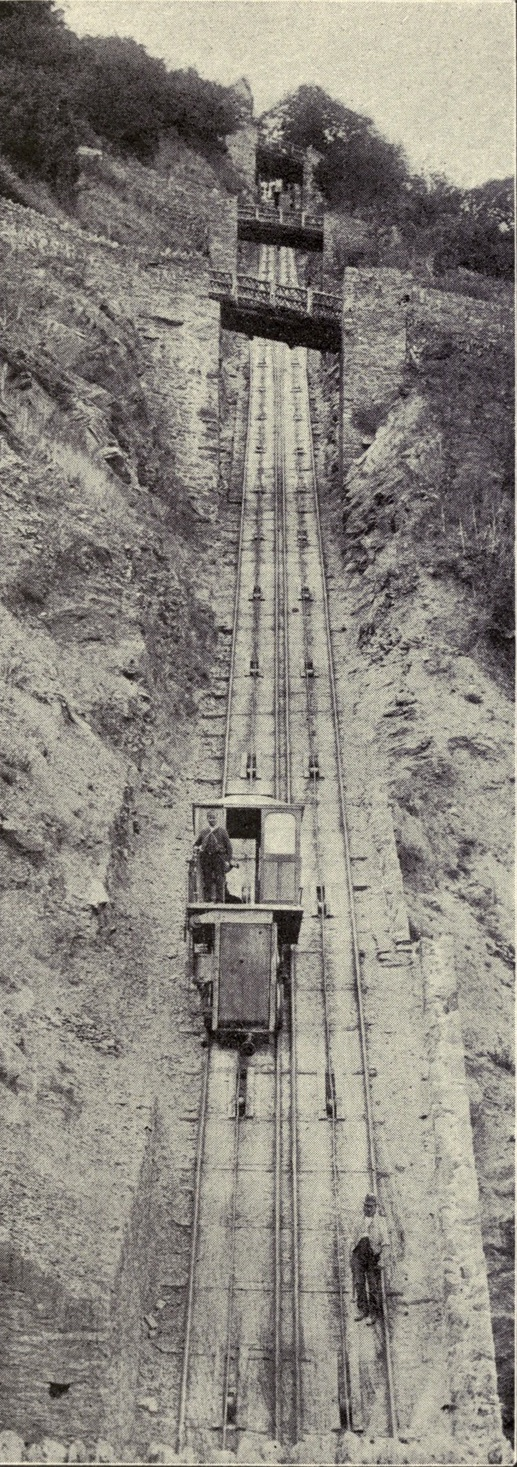
The railway shortly after construction was completed

=== Origins ===
The high cliffs separating Lynton and Lynmouth made travel and economic development in the area difficult. Most goods, including coal, lime, foodstuffs and other essentials, were delivered by sea to Lynmouth and then carried by packhorses and carts up the steep hill to Lynton.

The cliffs posed difficulties for the burgeoning tourist industry in the region. Holidaymakers arrived at Lynmouth on paddle steamers from Bristol and Swansea and other ports in the Bristol Channel, from about 1820. Ponies, donkeys and carriages were available for hire, but the steep gradients led to the animals having short working lives. As the 19th century progressed, it was apparent that the cliffs were restricting the transport of goods between the villages and deterring prospective visitors.

In 1881, proposals for a tramway or a rail-based lift emerged. The scheme would have used a stationary steam engine at Lynton but was not progressed. In 1885, another proposal was made for a pier and cliff lift.

=== Construction ===
Lynmouth and Lynton Lift Act 1888
- Act of Parliament
- Parliament of the United Kingdom
- Long title: An Act for making Lifts between Lynmouth and Lynton in the county of Devon and for other purposes.
- Citation: 51 & 52 Vict. c. xcii

Dates
- Royal assent: 5 July 1888

Text of statute as originally enacted

The Lynmouth and Lynton Lift Act 1888 (51 & 52 Vict. c. xcii), authorised the formation of the Lynmouth and Lynton Lift Company. It was given the perpetual rights to extract up to 60,000 imperial gallons (270,000 L; 72,000 US gal) of river water from the Lyn Valley per day.

The water-powered railway was designed by civil engineer George Croydon Marks, who provided the company's engineering expertise. Its construction was financed mainly by his business partner, publisher Sir George Newnes who owned a large residence at Hollerday Hill and who also backed the Lynton and Barnstaple Railway in 1898 and the construction of Lynton Town Hall in 1900. Robert Jones, was appointed the contractor to build the cliff railway; Jones also contributed to the system's design.

Construction started in 1887. A cutting was excavated in the limestone cliff to form the trackbed and three bridges were built over it to carry existing cliff paths. Progress relied entirely on manual labour. The railway was completed in February 1890. Jones served as the company's engineer until 1921.

== Operations ==
The cliff railway opened on Easter Monday, 7 April 1890, and has been in continuous use ever since. It quickly found use in carrying various goods including coal, ice, sand, granite, cement, petrol and paraffin. The cars were horizontal platforms with sprung, demountable passenger carriage bodies on them.

An unusual feature is the halt just below Lynton station at North Walk which has road access. Larger freight items, including motor cars, were moved by the railway into the late 1950s. During rail replacement operations in winter 2006, the halt was used for access and material storage.

In June 1995, the upper and lower waiting rooms were given Grade II listed status. On 18 September 2014, the Institution of Mechanical Engineers (IMECHE) recognised the railway as a unique and outstanding example of British engineering as the first public water-powered total-loss funicular railway in the UK.

In April 2018, the cliff railway was briefly closed for safety checks following a landslip near the middle bridge. The collapse, caused by a combination of heavy rain, freezing conditions, and high winds, deposited debris onto the track; the railway was not operating at the time.

== Technical details ==
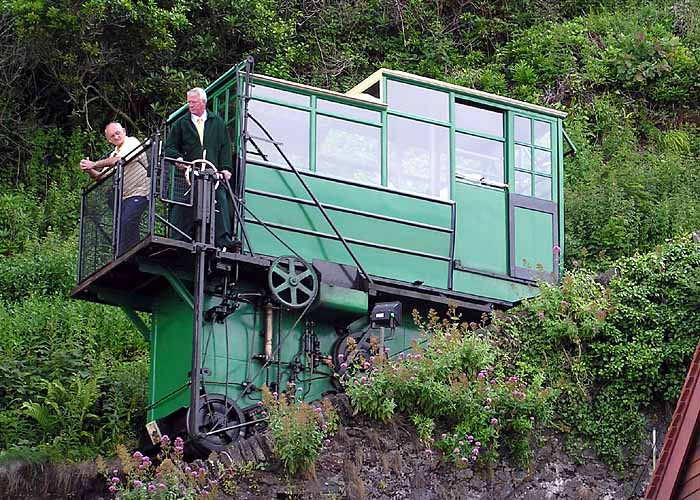
Cliff Railway car, showing the braking mechanism

The railway has two cars, each carrying up to 40 passengers. They are attached to cables running up and down from each car and passing round 5 ft 6 in (1.676 m) pulleys at each end of the incline, an example of a bottom towrope used to balance the weight of the cables. The system originally used single cables, but this was later replaced by double cables, presumably as a safety measure. The cars require no power to operate, and the system has a relatively low carbon footprint.

Water is piped over 1 mile (1.6 km) from the West Lyn River through 5-inch (127 mm) diameter pipes to a storage reservoir at the upper station. Each car has a 700-imperial-gallon (3,182 L; 841 US gal) tank mounted between the wheels. Once passengers are loaded at each station, the brakes are released and water is released from the bottom car until the top car is heavier and starts to descend, pulling the lower car up as it does so. Sometimes, the weight of passengers on the top car is enough without releasing any water from the bottom car. Upon arrival at the top station, the car's tank is refilled ready for the next descent. During the descent, the speed is controlled by a driver in each car; they communicate using hand signals to synchronise their efforts. Due to the steepness of the railway, the original carriages incorporated four independent braking systems, the primary system using hydraulically-actuated callipers that directly clamp onto the under-side of the rail heads, secondary friction brakes are provided by steel shoes that press onto the rails; water instead of oil is used as hydraulic fluid, a unique feature of the Lynmouth & Lynton Cliff Railway. The lower platform was fitted with inter-connected hydraulic buffers - the arriving down car would push the water from its pair of buffers through a narrow pipe into the opposite pair, thus setting them for the next descending car. In June 1888, the braking arrangement was jointly patented by Newnes, Jones and Marks.

The parallel 3-foot-8-inch (1,120 mm) gauge tracks rise 500 feet (152.4 m) and are 862 feet (262.7 m) long, giving the line a gradient of 1:1.724 (58%). Halfway up the incline is a passing bay where increased separation of the tracks allows the car to pass. The track uses Bullhead rails. Originally the line used larch sleepers bolted to the exposed rock, and in places to blocks of concrete. The wooden sleepers have since been replaced with modern concrete ones.

== See also ==
- Other local railway attractions
  - Bideford and Instow Railway
  - Lynton and Barnstaple Railway
  - West Somerset Railway
- List of funicular railways
- Water counterbalace propulsion
