= George Marks, 1st Baron Marks =

British engineer and politician (1858–1938)

The Right Honourable The Lord Marks CBE
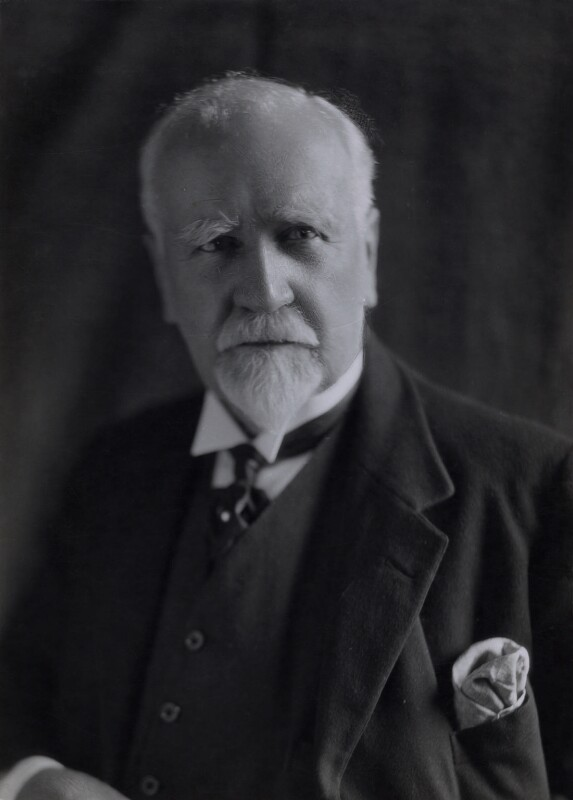

Member of the House of Lords Lord Temporal
- In office 16 July 1929 – 24 September 1938; Hereditary peerage
- Preceded by: Peerage created
- Succeeded by: Peerage Extinct

Member of Parliament for North Cornwall Launceston (1906–18)
- In office 8 February 1906 – 29 October 1924
- Preceded by: John Moulton
- Succeeded by: Alfred Martyn Williams

Personal details
- Born: George Croydon Marks; 9 June 1858 Eltham, Kent, UK
- Died: 24 September 1938 (aged 80) Poole, Dorset, UK
- Party: Labour (1929–1938)
- Other political affiliations: Liberal (Before 1916, 1923–1929); Coalition Liberal (1916–1922); National Liberal (1922–1923)
- Spouse: Margaret Maynard
- Parents: William Marks (father); Amelia Croydon (mother)
- Education: King's College London
- Occupation: Civil engineer

George Croydon Marks, 1st Baron Marks, CBE (9 June 1858 – 24 September 1938), known as Sir George Marks between 1911 and 1929, was an English engineer, patent agent and Liberal (later Labour) politician.

== Early life and career ==
Marks was born in Eltham in Kent, the eldest of eight children of William Marks and Amelia Adelaide Croydon, of whom only four survived childhood. After attending a local private school, at age 13 he became apprenticed at the Royal Arsenal, Woolwich, where his father William was a foreman, and continued his general education part-time at the Royal Arsenal School. At 17, he won a Whitworth Exhibition for two years at King's College, University of London.

== Business career ==
Described in a contemporary source as a disciple of Brunel, he joined Sir Richard Tangye's company, whose works were closely associated with funicular lifts. Marks was appointed head of the lift department, in which role he was in charge of the installation of the Saltburn Cliff Lift. 1880, he set up a private practice in Birmingham and married Margaret Maynard; they never had any children. In 1887 he formed a partnership with Dugald Clerk, forming the international intellectual property firm Marks & Clerk, which now operates in 18 countries worldwide. The firm became big enough to move its headquarters to London in 1893, with branches in Birmingham and Manchester. Developing a number of cliff railways and steep-incline tramcar systems, including the Matlock Cable Tramway in 1893, the Swansea Constitution Hill Incline Railway in 1896–8, commissions included the design of the new Gothic pavilion at the Royal Pier and the Cambrian Hotel (later the United Theological College), both in Aberystwyth. He was also responsible for the Bridgnorth Castle Hill Railway in Shropshire, begun in 1891. The company, which still operates the railway today, was founded by Marks, who became its first managing director from 1891 until 1901. He was also the founder of the patent attorneys Marks & Clerk, who continue to trade.

Marks continued his engineering practice alongside his patent interests. This included a partnership from 1890 with Sir George Newnes, which also concentrated on cliff railways, including an early stage development of Babbacombe Cliff Railway. In 1911 he set up an office in New York in conjunction with Thomas Edison.

Marks was a member of the Institution of Mechanical Engineers and an Associate Member of the Institution of Civil Engineers.

== Political career ==
In 1906, Marks was elected as Member of Parliament (MP) for the North-Eastern or Launceston Division of Cornwall in the Liberal landslide general election victory. He received a knighthood in 1911, served at the Ministry of Munitions during the First World War, and was awarded the CBE for work as a commissioner for the dilution of labour in 1917. He held his Parliamentary seat until it was abolished at the 1918 general election, when he was returned for the new Northern Division of Cornwall. He held that seat until his defeat at the 1924 general election.

In 1929, he left the Liberals and joined Ramsay MacDonald's Labour Party. His almost immediate reward came when he was raised to the peerage as Baron Marks, of Woolwich in the County of Kent on 16 July 1929.

== Personal life & death ==
Marks continued his engineering and business activities and died at his home in Poole, Dorset in September 1938, aged 80. As he had no children, his peerage died with him.

== Awards and memberships ==
- Member, Institution of Mechanical Engineers
- Associate Member, Institution of Civil Engineers, and Telford Premium Award, 1893-4
- Knight of the Ducal Order of Ernest (Hungary), 1896
- Knight Bachelor at the Coronation of George V, 1910
- Commander, Order of the British Empire (C.B.E.), 1917
- 1st Baron Marks, of Woolwich, 16 July 1929

Parliament of the United Kingdom
Preceded by John Fletcher Moulton	Member of Parliament for Launceston; 1906–1918	Constituency abolished
New constituency	Member of Parliament for North Cornwall; 1918–1924	Succeeded by Alfred Martyn Williams
Peerage of the United Kingdom
New creation	Baron Marks; 1929–1938	Extinct
