= Practical Motorist =

British magazine

- Practical Motorist, March 1980
- Frequency: Monthly
- Publisher: George Newnes Ltd (1934–1940)
- First issue: 12 May 1934
- Final issue: 1997
- Country: United Kingdom

Practical Motorist was a British car magazine founded on 12 May 1934 (as The Practical Motorist) by George Newnes Ltd. Its emphasis was on DIY car maintenance supplemented with more general motoring topics. Initially it was a weekly magazine until publication was suspended in 1940. It was relaunched as a monthly in 1954, retitled Practical Motorist & Motor Cyclist, reverting to Practical Motorist in 1959. Publication ceased in 1997.
