= List of British films of 1950 =

British films released in 1950

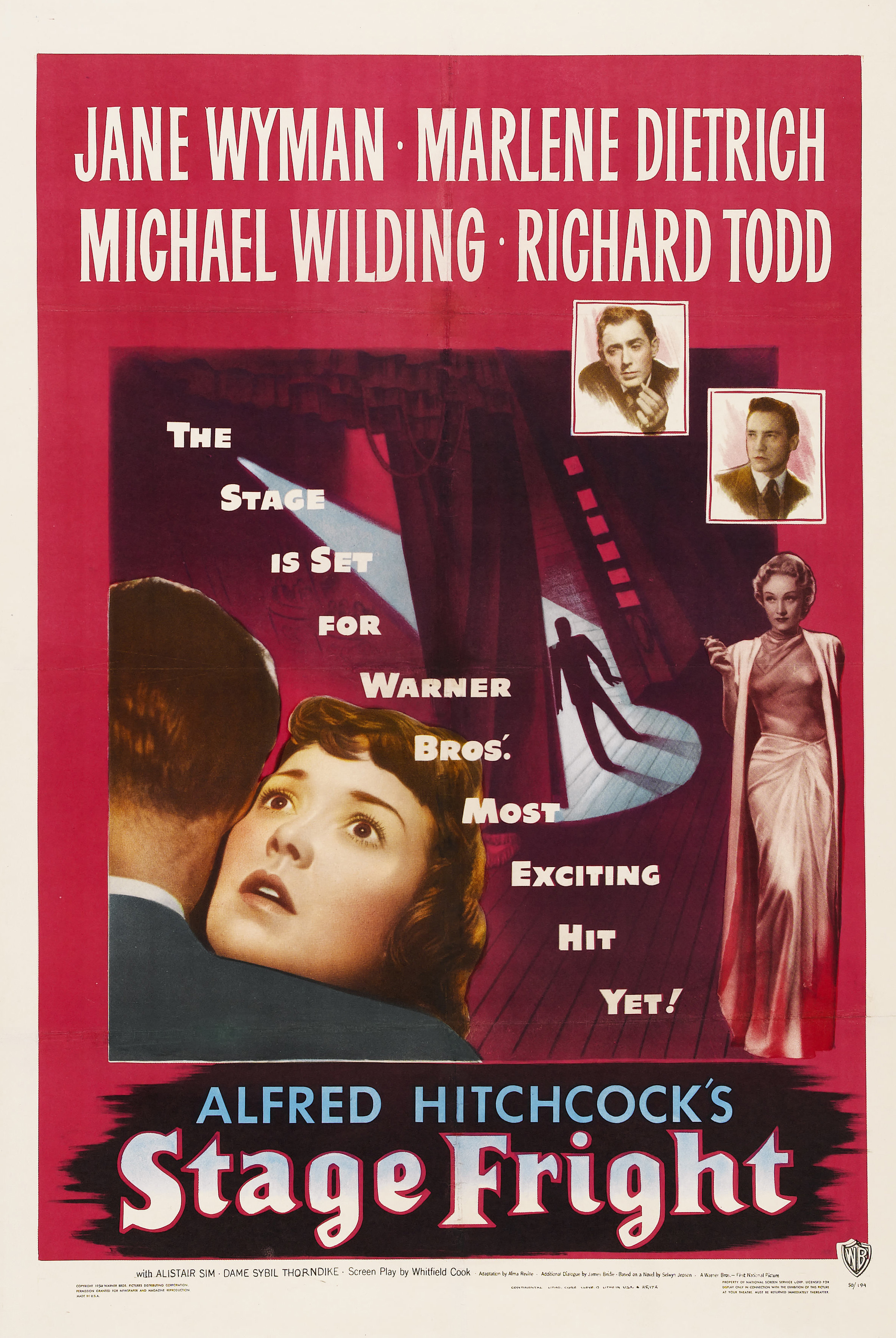
Stage Fright directed by Alfred Hitchcock.

A list of films produced in the United Kingdom in 1950 (see 1950 in film):

== 1950 ==
Title	Director	Cast	Genre	Notes
1950
The Angel with the Trumpet	Anthony Bushell	Eileen Herlie, Basil Sydney, Maria Schell	Drama	
The Astonished Heart	Terence Fisher	Celia Johnson, Noël Coward, Margaret Leighton	Drama	
Bait	Frank Richardson	John Bentley, Diana Napier, Patricia Owens	Crime	
Bitter Springs	Ralph Smart	Tommy Trinder, Chips Rafferty, Gordon Jackson	Western	Co-production with Australia
Blackout	Robert S. Baker	Maxwell Reed, Dinah Sheridan, Patric Doonan	Crime	
The Black Rose	Henry Hathaway	Tyrone Power, Orson Welles, Cécile Aubry	Adventure, Historical	
The Blue Lamp	Basil Dearden	Jack Warner, Jimmy Hanley, Dirk Bogarde	Crime	Ealing Studios; BAFTA Award for Best British Film
The Body Said No!	Val Guest	Michael Rennie, Yolande Donlan, Hy Hazell	Comedy	
Cage of Gold	Basil Dearden	Jean Simmons, David Farrar Herbert Lom	Drama	
Cairo Road	David MacDonald	Laurence Harvey, Eric Portman, Maria Mauban	Crime	
Chance of a Lifetime	Bernard Miles	Basil Radford, Niall MacGinnis, Bernard Miles	Drama	
The Clouded Yellow	Ralph Thomas	Trevor Howard, Jean Simmons, Kenneth More	Thriller	
Come Dance with Me	Mario Zampi	Max Wall, Anne Shelton, Barbara Hamilton	Musical	
Dance Hall	Charles Crichton	Petula Clark, Natasha Parry, Diana Dors	Musical	Ealing Studios
The Dancing Years	Harold French	Dennis Price, Gisèle Préville, Patricia Dainton	Musical	
Dangerous Assignment	Ben R. Hart	Lionel Murton, Ivan Craig, MacDonald Parke	Crime	
Dark Interval	Charles Saunders	Zena Marshall, Andrew Osborn, John Le Mesurier	Crime	
Dick Barton at Bay	Godfrey Grayson	Don Stannard, Tamara Desni, Meinhart Maur	Action based on radio serial	
Don't Say Die	Vivian Milroy	Sandra Dorne, Constance Smith, Charles Heslop	Comedy	
Double Confession	Ken Annakin	Derek Farr, Peter Lorre, William Hartnell	Crime	
The Dragon of Pendragon Castle	John Baxter	Robin Netscher, Hilary Rennie, Graham Moffatt	Family	
The Elusive Pimpernel	Michael Powell, Emeric Pressburger	David Niven, Margaret Leighton, Cyril Cusack	Adventure	
The Fall of the House of Usher	Ivan Barnett	Gwen Watford, Kay Tendeter	Horror	
Four Men in Prison	Max Anderson	William Mervyn, Arthur Mullard	Documentary	
The Girl Is Mine	Marjorie Deans	Patrick Macnee, Pamela Deeming	Drama	
The Girl Who Couldn't Quite	Norman Lee	Bill Owen, Betty Stockfeld, Iris Hoey	Drama	
Golden Salamander	Ronald Neame	Trevor Howard, Anouk Aimée, Herbert Lom	Thriller	
Gone to Earth	Michael Powell, Emeric Pressburger	Jennifer Jones, David Farrar, Cyril Cusack	Romance	
The Gorbals Story	David MacKane	Howard Connell, Betty Henderson	Drama	
Guilt Is My Shadow	Roy Kellino	Elizabeth Sellars, Patrick Holt, Peter Reynolds	Drama	
Hangman's Wharf	Cecil H. Williamson	John Witty, Genine Graham, Campbell Singer	Crime	
The Happiest Days of Your Life	Frank Launder	Alastair Sim, Margaret Rutherford, Guy Middleton	Comedy	
Her Favourite Husband	Mario Soldati	Jean Kent, Robert Beatty, Rona Anderson	Comedy	Co-production with Italy
Highly Dangerous	Roy Ward Baker	Margaret Lockwood, Dane Clark, Marius Goring	Spy	
Into the Blue	Herbert Wilcox	Michael Wilding, Odile Versois, Jack Hulbert	Comedy	
The Kangaroo Kid	Lesley Selander	Jock Mahoney, Veda Ann Borg	Western	Co-production with Australia
The Lady Craved Excitement	Godfrey Grayson, Francis Searle	Hy Hazell, Michael Medwin, Sid James	Comedy	
Last Holiday	Henry Cass	Alec Guinness, Beatrice Campbell, Kay Walsh	Comedy	Ealing Studios
Let's Have a Murder	John E. Blakeley	Jimmy Jewel, Ben Warriss	Comedy	
Lilli Marlene	Arthur Crabtree	Hugh McDermott, Lisa Daniely	Drama	
Madeleine	David Lean	Ann Todd, Ivan Desny, Leslie Banks	Film Noir	
The Magnet	Charles Frend	Stephen Murray, Kay Walsh, James Fox	Comedy drama	
Midnight Episode	Gordon Parry	Stanley Holloway, Leslie Dwyer, Joy Shelton	Mystery	
Morning Departure	Roy Ward Baker	John Mills, Nigel Patrick, George Cole	Drama	
The Mudlark	Jean Negulesco	Irene Dunne, Alec Guinness, Beatrice Campbell	Historical	
Murder Without Crime	J. Lee Thompson	Dennis Price, Derek Farr	Crime	
My Daughter Joy	Gregory Ratoff	Edward G. Robinson, Peggy Cummins, Richard Greene	Drama	
The Naked Heart	Marc Allégret	Michèle Morgan, Kieron Moore	Drama	
Night and the City	Jules Dassin	Richard Widmark, Gene Tierney, Googie Withers	Crime	
No Place for Jennifer	Henry Cass	Leo Genn, Rosamund John	Drama	
No Trace	John Gilling	Hugh Sinclair, Dinah Sheridan	Crime	
Odette	Herbert Wilcox	Anna Neagle, Trevor Howard	World War II/spy	
Old Mother Riley Headmistress	John Harlow	Arthur Lucan, Kitty McShane	Comedy	
Once a Sinner	Lewis Gilbert	Patricia Kirkwood, Jack Watling	Drama	
Over the Garden Wall	John E. Blakeley	Norman Evans, Jimmy James	Comedy	
Paul Temple's Triumph	Maclean Rogers	John Bentley, Dinah Sheridan	Mystery	
Portrait of Clare	Lance Comfort	Margaret Johnston, Richard Todd	Drama	
Prelude to Fame	Fergus McDonell	Guy Rolfe, Kathleen Byron	Drama	
The Reluctant Widow	Bernard Knowles	Jean Kent, Guy Rolfe	Drama	
Room to Let	Godfrey Grayson	Jimmy Hanley, Valentine Dyall	Crime	
The Second Mate	John Baxter	Gordon Harker, Graham Moffatt	Crime	
Seven Days to Noon	John Boulting, Roy Boulting	Barry Jones, André Morell, Hugh Cross	Thriller	
Shadow of the Eagle	Sidney Salkow	Richard Greene, Valentina Cortese	Historical	
Shadow of the Past	Mario Zampi	Joyce Howard, Terence Morgan	Crime	
She Shall Have Murder	Daniel Birt	Rosamund John, Derrick De Marney	Drama	
So Long at the Fair	Terence Fisher, Antony Darnborough	Dirk Bogarde, Jean Simmons	Drama/thriller	
Soho Conspiracy	Cecil H. Williamson	Zena Marshall, Peter Gawthorne	Musical	
Someone at the Door	Francis Searle	Garry Marsh, Yvonne Owen	Comedy crime	
Something in the City	Maclean Rogers	Richard Hearne, Garry Marsh	Comedy	
Stage Fright	Alfred Hitchcock	Jane Wyman, Marlene Dietrich, Michael Wilding	Crime	
State Secret	Sidney Gilliat	Douglas Fairbanks Jr., Jack Hawkins	Drama	
They Were Not Divided	Terence Young	Edward Underdown, Ralph Clanton	World War II	
Tony Draws a Horse	John Paddy Carstairs	Cecil Parker, Anne Crawford	Comedy	
Torment	John Guillermin	Dermot Walsh, Rona Anderson	Thriller	
Treasure Island	Byron Haskin	Robert Newton, Bobby Driscoll	Adventure	U.K./U.S. co-production
Trio	Ken Annakin, Harold French	Jean Simmons, Kathleen Harrison	Drama	Anthology of stories by W. Somerset Maugham
The Twenty Questions Murder Mystery	Paul L. Stein	Robert Beatty, Rona Anderson	Crime	
Up for the Cup	Jack Raymond	Albert Modley, Mae Bacon	Sports/comedy	
What the Butler Saw	Godfrey Grayson	Edward Rigby, Henry Mollison	Comedy	
The Woman in Question	Anthony Asquith	Jean Kent, Dirk Bogarde	Mystery	
The Woman with No Name	Ladislao Vajda	Phyllis Calvert, Edward Underdown, Richard Burton	Drama	
The Wooden Horse	Jack Lee	Leo Genn, Anthony Steel, David Tomlinson	World War II	
Waterfront	Michael Anderson	Robert Newton, Kathleen Harrison	Drama	
Your Witness	Robert Montgomery	Robert Montgomery, Cyril Cusack	Drama	

== See also ==
- 1950 in British music
- 1950 in British television
- 1950 in the United Kingdom
