= 1950 in British radio =

This is a list of events from British radio in 1950.

== Events ==
- 17 February – an appearance on Variety Fanfare from Manchester launches Al Read's comedy career.
- 29 May – The Archers pilot episodes debut on BBC radio, aired on the Midlands opt-out of the BBC Home Service; the series will still be running 75 years later.
- 6 June – the BBC Light Programme first broadcasts Educating Archie, featuring ventriloquist Peter Brough and his schoolboy dummy Archie Andrews (sic.); the series runs for 10 years and averages 15 million listeners.
- 5 November – the BBC Light Programme first broadcasts Life with the Lyons, the UK's first sitcom, featuring British-domiciled American couple Ben Lyon and Bebe Daniels.
- 3 December – the BBC Light Programme first broadcasts the magazine and variety programme Calling All Forces featuring Ted Ray; his catchphrase "You should use stronger elastic" originates.
- Gracie Fields' radio show transfers from the BBC to Radio Luxembourg, where it is sponsored by Wisk soap powder.

== Debuts ==
- 16 January – Listen with Mother, on the BBC Light Programme (1950–1982)
- 6 June – Educating Archie, on the BBC Light Programme (1950–1960)
- 7 June – The Archers, pilot episode (1950–Present)
- 5 November – Life with the Lyons, on the BBC Light Programme (1950–1961)
- 3 December – Calling All Forces, on the BBC Light Programme (1950–1952)

== Continuing radio programmes ==
=== 1930s ===
- In Town Tonight (1933–1960)

=== 1940s ===
- Music While You Work (1940–1967)
- Sunday Half Hour (1940–2018)
- Desert Island Discs (1942–Present)
- Family Favourites (1945–1980)
- Down Your Way (1946–1992)
- Have A Go (1946–1967)
- Housewives' Choice (1946–1967)
- Letter from America (1946–2004)
- Woman's Hour (1946–Present)
- Twenty Questions (1947–1976)
- Any Questions? (1948–Present)
- Mrs Dale's Diary (1948–1969)
- Take It from Here (1948–1960)
- Billy Cotton Band Show (1949–1968)
- A Book at Bedtime (1949–Present)
- Ray's a Laugh (1949–1961)

== Births ==
- 2 February – Libby Purves, radio presenter.
- 12 May – Jenni Murray, journalist, presenter of Woman's Hour (died 2026)
- 5 June – Jonathan Fryer, foreign correspondent, writer and politician (died 2021)
- 8 July – Sarah Kennedy, radio presenter
- Bob Oliver Rogers, comedy producer (died 1979)

== See also ==
- 1950 in British music
- 1950 in British television
- 1950 in the United Kingdom
- List of British films of 1950
