= The Girl Is Mine (disambiguation) =

"The Girl Is Mine" is a 1982 song by Michael Jackson and Paul McCartney.

The Girl Is Mine may also refer to:

- "The Girl Is Mine" (99 Souls song), 2015
- The Girl Is Mine (film), 1950 British drama film

== See also ==
- The Boy Is Mine (disambiguation)
