= 1950 in British music =

This is a summary of 1950 in music in the United Kingdom.

== Events ==
- 9 March – UK premiere of Britten's Spring Symphony at the Royal Albert Hall, London, conducted by Eduard van Beinum.
- September – Herbert Howells' Hymnus Paradisi receives its première at the Three Choirs Festival; the work had been written in 1938, shortly after the death of the composer's young son.
- 24 September – US musicologist Alan Lomax leaves for a tour of Europe, in the course of which he collects folk music from all over the UK, broadcasts on the BBC, and works with folklorists Peter Douglas Kennedy, Hamish Henderson, and Séamus Ennis, recording among others, Margaret Barry and the songs in Irish of Elizabeth Cronin; Scots ballad singer Jeannie Robertson; and Harry Cox of Norfolk.
- Jazz musician John Dankworth forms the Dankworth Seven, with Jimmy Deuchar (trumpet), Eddie Harvey (trombone), Don Rendell (tenor sax), Bill Le Sage (piano), Eric Dawson (bass) and Tony Kinsey (drums).
- Gracie Fields' radio show transfers from the BBC to Radio Luxembourg, where it is sponsored by Wisk soap powder.
- Pianist Moura Lympany divorces her husband Colin Defries.
- Harrison & Harrison begin work on a 7,866 pipe organ destined for the Royal Festival Hall, working to a design by Ralph Downes.

== Classical music: new works ==
- Malcolm Arnold – English Dances for orchestra, op. 27
- Benjamin Britten – Lachrymae
- Arnold Cooke – Trio for Violin, Viola and Cello
- Vivian Ellis – Alpine Pastures
- Arwel Hughes – Dewi Sant (Saint David) (oratorio)
- Humphrey Searle – Poem for 22 Strings
- William Walton – 2 Pieces for violin and piano
- Grace Williams – Three Traditional Ballads
- W. S. Gwynn Williams – Breuddwyd Glyndwr

== Opera ==
- Hugo Cole – Asses' Ears
- Lawrance Collingwood – The Death of Tintagiles
- Norman Demuth – The Oresteia
- Brian Easdale – The Corn King (written in 1935)
- Berthold Goldschmidt – Beatrice Cenci
- Inglis Gundry – The Horses of the Dawn (not performed)
- Elisabeth Lutyens – Penelope

== Film and Incidental music ==
- Richard Addinsell – The Black Rose
- William Alwyn – State Secret
- Anthony Collins – Odette
- Benjamin Frankel – Night and the City
- Leighton Lucas – Stage Fright
- John Wooldridge – The Woman in Question

== Musical theatre ==
- Noël Coward – Ace of Clubs
- Harry Parr Davies – Dear Miss Phoebe
- Ivor Novello – Gay's the Word
- Sandy Wilson – Caprice

== Musical films ==
- Come Dance with Me, featuring Anne Shelton and Anton Karas
- Dance Hall, starring Petula Clark and Diana Dors
- The Dancing Years, starring Dennis Price

== Births ==
- 21 January – Billy Ocean (real name Leslie Charles), singer and songwriter
- 12 February – Steve Hackett, English singer-songwriter, guitarist, and producer (Genesis, Quiet World, and GTR)
- 24 February – Howard Griffiths, conductor
- 13 February — Peter Gabriel, singer and songwriter
- 19 February — Andy Powell, musician (Wishbone Ash)
- 9 March – Howard Shelley, pianist and conductor
- 10 March – Stephen Oliver, opera composer (died 1992 in British music)
- 20 April – Ray Hodson (Line Dance Instructor – UK)
- 22 April — Peter Frampton, singer and songwriter
- 3 May — Mary Hopkin, singer
- 13 May – Danny Kirwan, guitarist, singer and songwriter (Fleetwood Mac)
- 22 May — Bernie Taupin, songwriter
- 1 June – Tom Robinson, singer and songwriter
- 5 June – Barbara Gaskin, singer
- 16 June – Andrew Ball, pianist
- 23 June – Nicholas Cleobury, conductor
- 27 August – Neil Murray, bass guitarist
- 14 September – Paul Kossoff, guitarist (Free) (died 1976)
- 26 September – Simon Brint, comedy musician and composer (died 2011)
- 18 November – Graham Parker, singer-songwriter and guitarist (The Rumour)

== Deaths ==
- 14 February – Robert Graham Manson, violinist, pianist and composer, 66
- 26 February – Sir Harry Lauder, singer, comedian and songwriter, 79
- 19 April – Gerald Tyrwhitt-Wilson, 14th Baron Berners, composer, writer and artist, 66
- 13 May – Bruno Siegfried Huhn, organist and composer, 78
- 6 June – Alfred Edward Moffat, composer and collector of music, 86
- 28 June – H. Balfour Gardiner, musician, composer and teacher, 72 (stroke)
- 14 October – Florence Aylward, composer, 88
- 26 October – Evelyn Suart, pianist, 69
- 19 November – Thomas Wood, composer, 57 (heart attack)
- 23 November – Percival Mackey, pianist, composer and bandleader, 56
- 1 December – Ernest John Moeran, composer, 55 (cerebral haemorrhage)
- 23 December – John Rippiner Heath, violinist and composer, 63
- 25 December – Edward d'Evry, organist and composer, 81
- "date unknown" – Kate Carney, singer and comedian, 80

== See also ==
- 1950 in British television
- 1950 in the United Kingdom
- List of British films of 1950
