= Just William's Luck (film) =

1947 film by Val Guest

- Cover of the "making of" book
- Directed by: Val Guest
- Written by: Richmal Crompton; Val Guest
- Produced by: James A. Carter (as James Carter)
- Starring: William Graham; Garry Marsh
- Cinematography: Leslie Rowson (uncredited)
- Edited by: Anne Barker
- Music by: Robert Farnon
- Distributed by: United Artists Corporation
- Release date: 17 December 1947 (London)
- Running time: 92 minutes
- Country: United Kingdom
- Language: English

Just William's Luck is a 1947 British comedy film directed by Val Guest and starring William Graham, Garry Marsh and Jane Welsh. It was written by Richmal Crompton and Guest, based on Crompton's Just William series of books. Crompton was impressed with the film and wrote a novel Just William's Luck based on the events of the film. The following year a second film, William Comes to Town, was made.

== Plot ==
William Brown, leader of his gang, "The Outlaws", while exploring/playing in a "haunted house", stumble across a gang of fur thieves. The children are kidnapped and are bundled into the back of a lorry which drives off. Spotting a large bag of flour, the boys proceed to kick it open. Its contents spill through a gap in the floorboards of the truck's cargo bay. This leaves a trail on the road for the police to follow who ultimately catch and foil the gang of fur robbers.

== Cast ==
- William Graham as William Brown
- Garry Marsh as Mr. Brown
- Jane Welsh as Mrs. Brown
- Hugh Cross as Robert Brown
- Kathleen Stuart as Ethel Brown
- Leslie Bradley as The Boss
- A. E. Matthews as The Tramp
- Muriel Aked as Emily, The Maid
- Brian Roper as Ginger
- Brian Weske as Henry
- Audrey Manning as Violet Elizabeth
- Hy Hazell as Gloria Gail
- Patricia Cutts as Gloria's Secretary
- James Crabbe as Douglas
- Michael Balfour as Jenks
- Ivan Hyde as Glazier
- Joan Hickson as Hubert's Mother
- John Powe as Policeman
- Anne Marie as Masseur
- Leslie Hazell as Hubert's Gang
- Peter David as Hubert's Gang
- John O'Hara as Hubert's Gang
- Michael Medwin as The Boss's Gang
- John Martell as Johnnie
- Ivan Craig as The Boss's Gang

== Production ==
Val Guest had some troubles working with children but said otherwise production went smoothly and both William films were "very successful."

== Critical reception ==
The Monthly Film Bulletin wrote: "William Graham gives an impish and very effective interpretation of Richmal Crompton's lovable brain-child. The individuality and variety promised by other members of the cast is somehow never quite fulfilled, although they each contribute a competent performance. One feels that the action has been deliberately slowed up, possibly with the idea of its being more easily assimilated by children. After the first few sequences, however, the film seems to find its own feet and is very enjoyable fun."

Picturegoer wrote: "Richmal Crompton's William has been rather heavily handled in this first of a new series. The way he rounds up a gang of black marketeers has its amusing moments, but some of the slapstick lacks spontaneity. The quieter moments in the family circle are much more effective. Juveniles, of course, will love it. William Graham is good, but perhaps not quite the ideal William."

Radio Times wrote, "while William Graham captures something of the scruffy boisterousness of Richmal Crompton's timeless comic creation, director Val Guest's screenplay smoothes away the rougher edges to produce a sanitised tale of childhood mayhem, suitable for young eyes. The same paternalism dogged the sequel, William at the Circus."

In British Sound Films: The Studio Years 1928–1959 David Quinlan rated the film as "average", writing: "Quite lively schoolboy romp that could have done with a scruffier William."

Sky Movies wrote, "it's a lively romp with a jolly knockabout climax in a house that William and his gang of `outlaws' are trying to haunt."
