= Brian Weske =

British actor (1932–2001)

Brian Weske (23 December 1932 – 15 October 2001) was a British film and television actor, singer, and songwriter. He was born in Stockwell, London, England and died in London, England aged 68. He married Italian actress and Italian translator speech artist for BBC Records, (1969-'72), Yole Marinelli, (who played in Drop Dead Darling, in 1966 and appeared in the 1967 The Avengers episode "The 50,000 pound Breakfast"), at Wandsworth Registry Office, on the 8th. of October, 1964, according to Shutterstock. Jess Conrad was the Best Man.

== Selected filmography ==
- Medal for the General (1944)
- Quiet Weekend (1946)
- Fame Is the Spur (1947)
- Just William's Luck (1947)
- William Comes to Town (1948)
- Pen Pictures from Rhodesia: Letter One (as Narrator)
- Brandy for the Parson (1952)
- No Safety Ahead (1959)
- Jungle Street (1960)
- Jazz Boat (1960)
- On the Fiddle (1961)
- Panic (1963)
- The Big Switch (1968)
- A Hole Lot of Trouble (1969)
- Jack the Ripper Part 1 (Porter) 1988
