= Princess Lilian =

Princess Lilian may refer to:

- Princess Lilian, Duchess of Halland (1915–2013), born Lilian Davies, later Princess of Sweden
- Princess Lilian of Belgium born Lilian Baels (1916–2002)
