= Androcles and the Lion (1952 film) =

1952 film by Chester Erskine, Nicholas Ray

- DVD cover
- Directed by: Chester Erskine; Nicholas Ray (uncredited)
- Screenplay by: Chester Erskine; Ken Englund
- Based on: Androcles and the Lion by George Bernard Shaw
- Produced by: Gabriel Pascal
- Starring: Jean Simmons; Victor Mature; Alan Young; Robert Newton; Maurice Evans
- Cinematography: Harry Stradling Sr.
- Edited by: Roland Gross
- Music by: Friedrich Hollaender
- Production company: RKO Pictures
- Distributed by: RKO Pictures
- Release dates: October 30, 1952 (Los Angeles); January 9, 1953 (US)
- Running time: 98 minutes
- Countries: United Kingdom; United States
- Language: English
- Budget: $1,250,000

Androcles and the Lion is a 1952 RKO Pictures satire film produced by Gabriel Pascal from the 1912 George Bernard Shaw play of the same name. It was Pascal's last film, made two years after the death of Shaw, his longtime friend and mentor, and two years before Pascal's own death.

== Plot ==
Androcles, a gentle Christian tailor, is pursued by Roman persecutors, accompanied by his nagging wife Megaera. While they are hiding in the forest, a Barbary lion approaches them. Megaera swoons, but tender-hearted Androcles sees that a large thorn is deeply embedded in the lion's paw, so he removes it while soothing the lion with baby talk. While Androcles and the lion, whom he names Tommy, are becoming best friends, his wife escapes, and when soldiers find Androcles and Tommy wrestling playfully, he is accused of sorcery.

Androcles is among a procession of Christian prisoners on their way to the Colosseum in Rome. They are joined by the fierce recent Christian convert Ferrovius, who struggles to restrain his bellicose nature. The Roman captain and the nobly born Christian convert Lavinia share a mutual attraction.

The party is sent into the arena to be slaughtered, but when Ferrovius demonstrates his powers of conversion and kills all of the gladiators, Antoninus Caesar declares that all his subjects should become Christians and offers him a commission in the Praetorian Guards, and Ferrovius accepts. To appease the crowd, it is necessary to choose one Christian to be savaged by a lion, and Androcles volunteers "to uphold the honor of the tailors." The lion is that which Androcles had helped in the forest, and they waltz round the arena to the delight of the audience. The emperor dashes behind the scenes for a better view and must be rescued from the lion by Androcles. The emperor orders an end to the persecution of Christians and allows Androcles and the lion to depart in peace.

== Cast ==
- Jean Simmons as Lavinia
- Victor Mature as the Captain
- Alan Young as Androcles
- Robert Newton as Ferrovius
- Maurice Evans as Caesar
- Elsa Lanchester as Megaera
- Reginald Gardiner as Lentulus
- Gene Lockhart the Menagerie Keeper
- Alan Mowbray as the Editor of Gladiators
- Noel Willman as Spintho
- John Hoyt as Cato
- Jim Backus as the Centurion
- Lowell Gilmore as Metellus
- Woody Strode as the Lion
- Strother Martin as Soldier
- Sylvia Lewis as the Chief of the Vestal Virgins

== Production ==
Harpo Marx was originally signed to play Androcles, and after the first five weeks of shooting, producer Gabriel Pascal was thrilled with the results. However, RKO Pictures head Howard Hughes, who had seen Alan Young on television, hired him for the lead and Marx was replaced. George Sanders intended to play Caesar but another commitment caused him to withdraw. José Ferrer was mentioned for the part of Androcles.

Under Pascal's contract with George Bernard Shaw, the film was required to include at least 75% of Shaw's original dialogue in the screenplay. However, as the play was short, additional material was added for the film version.

Filming started on August 13, 1951.

When the film opened in American cinemas, audiences did not laugh as much as was expected, so Hughes withdrew the film and shot two weeks of new sequences. Young later recalled: "He put in girls with gauze and a real lion, and it became a blood-and-guts film."
