= Whispering Tongues =

1934 film

- Reginald Tate in the film
- Directed by: George Pearson
- Written by: Bernard Mainwaring; H. Fowler Mear
- Produced by: Julius Hagen
- Starring: Reginald Tate; Jane Welsh; Russell Thorndike; Malcolm Keen
- Cinematography: Ernest Palmer
- Edited by: Lister Laurance
- Music by: W.L. Trytel
- Production company: Real Art Productions
- Distributed by: RKO Pictures
- Release date: March 1934
- Running time: 55 minutes
- Country: United Kingdom
- Language: English

Whispering Tongues is a 1934 British crime film directed by George Pearson and starring Reginald Tate, Jane Welsh and Russell Thorndike. It was written by Bernard Mainwaring and H. Fowler Mear.

== Plot ==
After an absence of several years, Alan Norton returns home to find that his father has just committed suicide following a vaguely defined scandal that had ruined his good name. Determined to avenge his father, Alan vows to ruin those responsible by stripping them of their assets. Under the guidance of his late father's butler Fenwick, a former burglar, Alan soon becomes a skilled safe-cracker. His campaign of revenge goes to plan until his final target, who turns out to be Roger Mayland, the father of Jane, the girl Alan has fallen in love with. When Alan refuses to go through with the robbery, a disgruntled Fenwick tips off the police. As a result, Alan is caught red-handed at Mayland's safe, though he is actually in the process of restoring the money he has previously stolen. When Alan reveals his identity and motivation, Mayland declines to press criminal charges, leaving the police baffled, and allowing the young lovers' relationship to remain happily intact.

== Cast ==
- Reginald Tate as Alan Norton
- Jane Welsh as Claudia Mayland
- Russell Thorndike as Fenwick
- Malcolm Keen as Inspector Dawley
- Felix Aylmer as Superintendent. Fulton
- Charles Carson as Roger Mayland
- Toni Edgar-Bruce as Lady Weaver
- Victor Stanley as steward

== Production ==
The film was made at Julius Hagen's Twickenham Studios as a quota quickie for release by RKO Pictures. The film's sets were designed by James A. Carter.

== Reception ==
Kine Weekly wrote: "George Pearson has unfolded a good story well, if on the leisurely side and with a tendency towards stage technique."

The Daily Film Renter wrote: "Story of not very convincing proportions developing on somewhat familiar lines, with hero falling in love with daughter of man he is out to despoil. Moderate production values, and acting tending to the melodramatic."
