= The Girl on the Pier =

1953 British film by Lance Comfort

- Opening titles
- Directed by: Lance Comfort
- Written by: Guy Morgan
- Produced by: John Temple-Smith executive Lance Comfort
- Starring: Veronica Hurst; Ron Randell; Charles Victor
- Cinematography: William McLeod
- Edited by: Gerald Landau
- Music by: Ray Terry; Eric Robinson
- Production company: Major Pictures
- Distributed by: Apex Film Distributors (UK)
- Release date: 1953
- Running time: 65 minutes
- Country: United Kingdom
- Language: English

The Girl on the Pier is a 1953 British second feature ('B') crime film directed by Lance Comfort and starring Veronica Hurst, Ron Randell, Brian Roper, Campbell Singer and Anthony Valentine. It was written by Guy Morgan and produced by John Temple-Smith. Crime melodrama set on Brighton Pier.

== Plot ==
Inspector Chubb dictates a warrant for arrest for murder, then catches a train to Brighton with his wife, their young son Charlie, and teenage daughter Cathy, who chats up a young crime reporter, Ronnie Hall, when she and Charlie go to the buffet car.

On Brighton Pier, ex-convict Nick Lane, who has recently started working on the pier with a dance band, flirts with Rita Hammond, talking of their assignation the night before and arranging to meet her at the dance that night. Nick surprises Rita by greeting her husband Joe Hammond as an old friend. The men go to Joe's office and Nick challenges Joe regarding the missing loot from a previous crime. He reveals that Hammond used to be called Harper. In the Chamber of Horrors section of Joe's Wax House, young Charlie Chubb hears part of the conversation. Hammond tries to get Rita to have a night out with him, wanting to make their marriage work, but she responds contemptuously. At the dance on the pier, Nick hooks up with Rita and gets inside information on Joe. Hammond spots them kissing under the pier. After Rita leaves, they fight. Nick wins and also threatens to blackmail him.

Joe demands that Rita does not see Nick again. While she sees Nick on the beach, Joe empties the safe and takes out a revolver. Charlie thinks he sees Joe kill Rita and tells his dad, but Rita is still alive.

Nick tells Ronnie Hall that Hammond is Harper; he tells Cathy and Charlie, and they wonder what Nick's motive is in telling them this. Ronnie, Cathy, and Charlie visit the library and find newspaper cuttings connecting Nick to "Harper" in a robbery 4 years before. Charlie sees a notice for a rehearsal and connecting this with what he saw, believes the murder will actually happen that night. Charlie tails Hammond/Harper and Cathy watches Rita while the reporter goes to tells their dad their theory. However, Charlie's mum drags Charlie away from the pier, thinking he is unwell. Inspector Chubb posts a couple of police officers on the pier, saying the police will deal with things in due course, and forbids Ronnie from going back to the pier. Despite the warning in advance, Nick gets shot by Hammond (who has disguised himself as a clown in his waxworks). Charlie sneaks out of bed and runs back to the pier, followed by his mum. They find Rita, who has fainted on finding Nick's dead body.

When the police arrive, Hammond "hides in plain sight" as a waxwork, but Charlie sees him move. A pursuit throughout the pier ensues, ending with Hammond falling into the sea and drowning.

== Cast ==
- Veronica Hurst as Rita Hammond
- Ron Randell as Nick Lane
- Charles Victor as Inspector Chubb
- Marjorie Rhodes as Mrs Chubb
- Campbell Singer as Joe Hammond
- Eileen Moore as Cathy Chubb
- Brian Roper as Ronnie Hall
- Anthony Valentine as Charlie Chubb

== Production ==
It was the first feature film from John Temple Smith’s Major Productions. Its working title was Palace Pier. Filming took place at Brighton in September 1952.

== Critical reception ==
The Monthly Film Bulletin wrote: "A synthetic and rather dingy little crime melodrama, with most exterior scenes filmed on and around Brighton's Palace Pier. Charles Victor and Marjorie Rhodes provide some inordinately heavy-handed comic relief and Veronica Hurst is uneasily miscast as the blonde floozie."

Kine Weekly said: "The plot is completely transparent but its artful 'seen through the eyes of a youngster' approach disarms criticism, and, at the same time, enables its main action, staged in a wax-works, to carry a few modest thrills."

In British Sound Films: The Studio Years 1928–1959 David Quinlan wrote: ''Drama is mostly sombre, slow.''
