= 1950 in British television =

This is a list of British television related events from 1950.

== Events ==
=== February ===
- 23 February – First televised report of general election results in the UK with coverage of the 1950 United Kingdom general election, although the footage is not recorded. Richard Dimbleby hosts the BBC coverage of the election, which he will do again for the 1951, 1955, 1959 and the 1964 United Kingdom general elections (and he or members of his family will do for sixty-seven years). On this occasion, Dimbleby is joined in the BBC Lime Grove Studios by R. B. McCallum, Fellow of Pembroke College, Oxford and author of The British General Election of 1945 and David Butler, research student of Nuffield College (who will appear on election programmes for 65 years). The first election night programme runs from 10:45pm until just after 1am.

=== April ===
- 3 April – The BBC aspect ratio changes from 5:4 to 4:3.

=== May ===
- 21 May – The BBC Television Service's Lime Grove Studios in London are opened officially by Violet Attlee, the Prime Minister's wife. These were purchased from Gaumont-British last year as a temporary measure until Television Centre is available. For the Children launches the BBC's dedicated children's programming from the new studio.

=== July ===
- 11 July – Children's marionette series Andy Pandy premieres on the BBC Television Service.

=== August ===
- 27 August – The first ever live television pictures from across the English Channel are transmitted by the BBC Television Service. The hour programme, Calais en fête, is broadcast live from Calais in northern France to mark the centenary of the first message sent by submarine telegraph cable from England to France.

=== September ===
- 8 September – The first outside broadcast of snooker takes place, at Leicester Square Hall. The balls are numbered with their values.
- 29 September – The first edition of the ballroom dancing competition show Come Dancing is shown on the BBC Television Service.
- 30 September – First BBC Television Service broadcast from an aircraft.

=== October ===
- 13 October – George Barnes becomes Director of BBC Television, taking over from Norman Collins.
- 15–27 October — No issues of Radio Times are published, due to a printing dispute.

=== December ===
- 20 December – Poet T. S. Eliot expresses concerns about "the television habit" in a letter to The Times (London).
- 23 December – Gala Variety with Dolores Gray becomes the first programme of its type to be broadcast by the BBC from its Lime Grove Studios.

=== Undated ===
- A cable network is launched in Gloucester, to provide better television reception than is possible at this time via a rooftop aerial.
- The first film made specifically for British television, A Dinner Date With Death, shot in 1949, is premiered, giving rise to an anthology series, "The Man Who Walks by Night".

== Debuts ==
- 8 January – Rope (1950)
- 2 February – The Scarlet Pimpernel (1950)
- 5 March – Sunday Night Theatre (1950–1959)
- 6 June – The Admirable Crichton (1950)
- 11 July – Andy Pandy (1950–1970, 2002–2005)
- 30 July – Adventure Story (1950)
- 29 September – Come Dancing (1950-1998)
- 24 November – Pet's Parlour with Petula Clark (1950–1953)
- 12 December – Little Women, drama serial in six parts, starring Norah Gorsen, David Jacobs, Barbara Everest and others (ends 23 January 1951)
- 31 December – Mr. Pastry's Progress (1950–1951)

== Continuing television shows ==
=== 1920s ===
- BBC Wimbledon (1927–1939, 1946–2019, 2021–present)

=== 1930s ===
- Picture Page (1936–1939, 1946–1952)
- For the Children (1937–1939, 1946–1952)
- Trooping the Colour (1937–1939, 1946–2019, 2023–present)
- The Boat Race (1938–1939, 1946–2019, 2021–present)
- BBC Cricket (1939, 1946–1999, 2020–2024)

=== 1940s ===
- Kaleidoscope (1946–1953)
- Muffin the Mule (1946–1955, 2005–2006)
- Café Continental (1947–1953)
- Television Newsreel (1948–1954)
- How Do You View? (1949–1953)

== Births ==
- 20 January – Liza Goddard, stage and television actress
- 27 January
  - Derek Acorah, medium and television host (died 2020)
  - Alex Norton, actor and screenwriter
- 3 February – Pamela Franklin, actress
- 22 February – Julie Walters, actress
- 22 March – Mary Tamm, actress (died 2012)
- 30 March – Robbie Coltrane, Scottish actor and comedian (died 2022)
- 3 April – Sally Thomsett, actress
- 9 May – Matthew Kelly, English actor and television host
- 10 May – Sally James, television presenter and actress
- 11 May – Jeremy Paxman, television presenter and author
- 9 June – David Troughton, actor
- 8 July – Sarah Kennedy, broadcaster
- 19 July – Simon Cadell, actor (died 1996)
- 26 July – Susan George, actress
- 12 August – Simon Groom, Blue Peter presenter
- 19 August – Jennie Bond, journalist and television presenter
- 17 September – Sherrie Hewson, actress, television presenter and novelist
- 14 December – Vicki Michelle, actress
- 17 December – Michael Cashman, actor and politician

== Deaths ==
- 5 March — Anthony Holles, actor, aged 49
- 22 March — Claude Bailey, actor, aged 54
- 8 May — Franklin Dyall, actor, aged 80

== See also ==
- 1950 in British music
- 1950 in the United Kingdom
- List of British films of 1950
