= Brian Roper (actor) =

American actor (1929–1994)

- Born: Brian T. Roper; 19 August 1929; Doncaster, West Riding of Yorkshire, England
- Died: 14 May 1994 (aged 64); Antibes, France
- Occupations: Actor; Real estate businessman
- Years active: c. 1936 – 1960
- Spouse: Barbara L. Eaton (1967–1972) Michelle Bisserier (1974–1994) (his death)

Brian T. Roper (Note: "Brian T. Roper" appears in the England and Wales Birth Index. It appears as such on the passenger manifest for an airline flight. The middle initial "T" appears on the Marriage Index reference and also appears in his name in his Modesto Bee advertisement reference, and again in the SSDI entry. All other references use the name without the middle initial.) (19 August 1929 – 14 May 1994) (Note: Roper is a common surname around this time period in this area of Great Britain, including on the very same England and Wales register. One should note the typed transcription of his age as "19", which agrees with the Birth Index, on the airflight manifest reference. Birth date in Holmstrom (1998) was erroneously listed as 9 August 1933, the day with a typographical error and the year based on the age of 14 which appeared in the press at his time of flying over to the United States. The Ragan (1992) birth date is listed in error as 19 August 1933, having picked up the year from the Holmstrom (1998) reference.) was a British-American film and television actor, and, in later years, real estate agent.

== Biography ==
Roper played youthful parts during his career due to his young physique, which included his appearance as the animal-loving young boy "Dickon" with a pet fox in The Secret Garden (1949), starring Margaret O'Brien. The Secret Garden was prepared for MGM's 25th anniversary as a film studio and was heavily promoted in 1949–50. Newspapers at the time claimed his age as 14. He appeared this age but was actually five years older. Roper was noted for his reddish hair and some freckles.

Born in Doncaster, West Riding of Yorkshire, Roper left Britain on 5 October 1948 when he was 19 years old after his selection for The Secret Garden from more than 100 boys who were tested during a six-month search. Work on the film began on 4 October 1948 and was completed in late November. He later lived in both Britain and California, depending on the location of his acting work, and acted for 24 years.

Following his acting career he went briefly into the film industry agency business. Roper married Barbara L. Eaton (aka Barbara L. Stafsudd), in Los Angeles when he was 38 years old, on 30 December 1967. His wife was 13 years younger. Shortly after this marriage, Roper established the Roper School of Real Estate in 1968 in Hayward, California and served as its lecturer and instructor. He would go on to train new salespeople while serving as director of sales training for Red Carpet Realtors in Northern California.

== Death ==
Brian Roper died in Antibes, France at the age of 64.

== Theatrical performances ==
Dramatic Shows
Year	Title	Role	Location	Notes
Before and around 1936	various		Britain	
Theatre (Stage Plays)
Year	Title	Role	Location	Notes
1947	The Boy David	David	London	Played title role in this biblical play, created for actress Elisabeth Bergner by J. M. Barrie, the author of Peter Pan; The Boy David was Barrie's last play. Brian played title role at the Scala Theatre, London on 2 December 1947, part of celebrations of the London Federation of Boys' Clubs Diamond jubilee.
1949	A Midsummer Night's Dream	Puck	Britain	

== Filmography ==
Film
Year	Film	Role	Notes
1947	Just William's Luck	Ginger	
1948	William Comes to Town	Ginger	U.S. title: William at the Circus.
1948	The Boy with Green Hair	Background boy.	Uncredited.
1949	The Secret Garden	Dickon	
1950	The Miniver Story	Richard	Uncredited.
1950	Maria Chapdelaine	Tit-Be Chapdelaine	French title: Maria Chapdelaine; U.S. title: The Naked Heart.
1952	Time Gentlemen, Please!	Cyril	Aka Nothing to Lose.
1953	The Girl on the Pier	Ronnie Hall	
1954	The Rainbow Jacket	Ron Saunders	
1955	The Blue Peter	Tony Mullins	U.S. title: Navy Heroes (1957).
1958	Hong Kong Confidential	Dennis Brooks	Spy film.
1960	The Lost World	Zoological Institute [British] – forum participant	Uncredited.
Television
Year	Title	Role	Notes
1951	Kaleidoscope	Boy page	TV serial of 6 episodes that aired 1951–1952. Roper appeared in 1 episode: Episode 2 – "Fools Rush In", 18 May 1951 (first air date).
1952	The Secret Garden (TV series 1952)	Dickon	TV serial of 8 episodes using the Alice de Grey adaptation of Frances Hodgson Burnett's novel (weekly on Tuesdays – first air dates: 29 April 1952 to 17 June 1952). Roper appeared in 4 episodes: Episode 4 – "The Door in the Wall", 20 May 1952.; Episode 6 – "A Tantrum in the Night", 3 June 1952.; Episode 7 – "It Has Come", 10 June 1952.; Episode 8 – "When The Sun Went Down", 17 June 1952.
1956	ITV Television Playhouse	Gormy Evans	TV serial that aired for 9 seasons, 1955–64. Roper appeared in 1 episode: Season 1, Episode 35 – "Boys in Brown", 24 May 1956 (first air date).
1955–1956	Billy Bunter of Greyfriars School	Bob Cherry	TV serial that aired for 7 seasons, 1952–61. Based on character Billy Bunter at Greyfriars School. Roper appeared in 8 episodes: Season 2, Episode 1 – "Bunter on the Run", 9 July 1955 (first air date).; Season 2, Episode 2 – "Bunter the Hypnotist", 23 July 1955.; Season 2, Episode 3 – "Lord Billy Bunter", 6 August 1955.; Season 2, Episode 4 – "Bunter Forgot", 20 August 1955.; Season 2, Episode 5 – "Bunter Takes the Blame", 3 September 1955.; Season 2, Episode 6 – "Bunter Knows How", 17 September 1955.; Season 3, Episode 1 – "Backing Up Bunter", 9 September 1956.; Season 3, Episode 2 – "Bunter the Bold", 16 September 1956.
1957	The Adventures of Sir Lancelot	Alan (4th year squire to King Rolf's son Prince Damien)	TV serial of 30 episodes that aired for 1 season, 1956–57. Roper appeared at the beginning of 1 episode: Season 1, Episode 18 – "Witches' Brew", 19 January 1957 (first air date).
1958	Studio 57		TV serial that aired for 4 seasons, 1954–1958. U.S. title: Heinz Studio 57. [See Heinz 57]. Roper appeared in 1 episode: Season 4, Episode 12 – "A Source of Irritation", 19 January 1958 (first air date).
1960	Adventures in Paradise	Potter	TV serial that aired for 3 seasons, 1959–62. Roper appeared in 1 episode: Season 2, Episode 7 – "Hangman's Island", 21 November 1960 (first air date).

== Awards and nominations ==
Year	Award	Result	Category	Film or series	Notes
1961	Golden Laurel Award (Note: Later renamed Producers Guild of America Award, or PGA Award.)	Nominated	Top Action Drama – 5th place	The Lost World (1960)	Award honors film (all persons involved).

== Affiliations ==
Type	Organisation	Notes
Member	National Association of Boys' Clubs (United Kingdom)	youth
Member	Screen Actors Guild (SAG)	adult

== References (books) ==
- Holmstrom, John (1998), The Moving Picture Boy – An International Encyclopaedia from 1895 to 1995, 2nd Revised Edition, Michael Russell (Publishing) Ltd., Wilby Hall, Wilby, Norwich, England, Great Britain; ISBN 0-85955-178-4 (ISBN 978-0-85955-178-6), hardcover. 1st Edition 1996.
- Ragan, David (1992), Who's Who in Hollywood – The Largest Cast of International Film Personalities Ever Assembled, 2nd Revised Edition, Facts on File (publisher), New York City, USA, 2 volumes (vol. 1 A-L, vol. 2 M-Z) (1,920 pp.); ISBN 0-8160-2011-6 (ISBN 978-0-8160-2011-9), hardcover. 1st Edition: Who's Who in Hollywood – 1900–1976, Arlington House (publisher), 1 volume (864 pp.), 1976; ISBN 0-87000-349-6 (ISBN 978-0870003493), hardcover; Crown Publishing, 1977; ISBN 0-517-54822-4 (ISBN 978-0517548226), hardcover.
- Zambrana, M. L. (2002), Nature Boy: The Unauthorized Biography of Dean Stockwell, iUniverse (publisher), 130 pp.; ISBN 0-595-21829-6 (ISBN 978-0595218295), softcover.
