= Gabriel Pascal =

Hungarian film producer (1894–1954)

- Pascal c. 1938
- Born: Gábor Lehel; 4 June 1894; Arad, Austria-Hungary (now Romania)
- Died: 6 July 1954 (aged 60); New York City, U.S.
- Occupation: Film producer
- Known for: Pygmailion; Major Barbara; Caesar and Cleopatra
- Spouse: Valerie Pascal (m. 1947; div. 1954)
- Children: Peter Pascal

Gabriel Pascal (born Gábor Lehel; 4 June 1894 – 6 July 1954) was a Hungarian film producer and director whose best-known films were made in the United Kingdom.

Pascal was the first film producer to successfully bring the plays of George Bernard Shaw to the screen. His most successful production was Pygmalion (1938), for which Pascal received an Academy Award nomination as its producer. Later adaptations of Shaw plays included Major Barbara (1941), Caesar and Cleopatra (1945) and Androcles and the Lion (1952).

== Early life ==
Pascal was born Gábor Lehel on 4 June 1894 in Arad, Transylvania, Kingdom of Hungary, Austro-Hungarian Empire (now Romania). His wife wrote in her book on Pascal's relationship with Shaw that her husband's "origin was shrouded in a mystery which, I often suspected, he enjoyed thickening with contradictory remarks. When people tried to probe into his past, he had a tailor-made answer for each inquirer."

He claimed to have been an orphan taken from a burning building as a child and raised first by Gypsies before being put into an orphanage. He also claimed that the Gypsies taught him to beg, steal, and do acrobatic tricks. It is unclear what parts of his account of his childhood are true as there are no formal records of him before the age of 17 when he was enlisted in military school in Holics, Hungary (now Holíč, Slovakia), by a mysterious Jesuit priest.

Pascal, who decidedly was unfit for military life, became interested in theatre and studied at the Academy of the Hofburgtheater in Vienna. Later, his interest expanded into the newly burgeoning cinema, and he made films in Germany and Italy with sporadic success. Becoming a teetotaler at an early age, he smoked cigars prodigiously, later provoking admonishments from George Bernard Shaw that he would ruin his voice.

Pascal had one son, Peter, conceived in Germany with his landlady's sister Elsie, during the delirium of a fever. Unable to care even for himself, Pascal fled to the Netherlands. After World War II ended, Pascal returned to Germany to search for his son Peter, but he was listed among the missing Hitler-Jugend. Elsie had been killed by a bomb.

== Early career ==
As a young man, Pascal found a job tending horses in Hungary. Leading the horses through the forest to a stream each day, Pascal developed the habit of riding naked and bareback through the Hungarian countryside. One day he accidentally rode stark naked through the outdoor set of a silent movie in production and was "discovered". The film's director asked him to repeat the ride for the cameras, and he joined the group. Soon he was making his own movies.

Pascal had another auspicious encounter when he was young while walking along the shore of the Mediterranean Sea. A much older man, George Bernard Shaw, was swimming naked holding onto a buoy. A conversation ensued, and Shaw dared the young Pascal on the shore to take off his clothes and join him in the water. He was impressed when Pascal immediately did so, and this began their friendship. Shaw enjoyed Pascal's youthful enthusiasm for art and his bravado, and invited him to visit him one day when he was broke. This chance meeting was to play a major role in Pascal's later career.

Pascal began his producing career making silent movies in Italy for German distribution through UFA Studios in Berlin. His directorial debut was Populi Morituri, in which he also starred. He later produced comedies in Germany.

== Meher Baba and India ==
In 1934, during a trip to Hollywood, Pascal was contacted by Princess Norina Matchabelli (wife of the perfume manufacturer) about a film project based on the teachings of Meher Baba. Pascal became very interested in this project, bringing writers Hy Kraft and Karl Vollmöller into helping him work up treatments and even making a trip to India to discuss the project further with Meher Baba. By the time Pascal arrived in India, however, Meher Baba did not seem in any hurry to complete the film, saying it could wait. He invited Pascal to travel with him in India. Most ordinary men would have been discouraged, but Pascal took energetically to the austere life of an eastern ascetic, even shedding his western garb for eastern clothing. He took a liking to Meher Baba and maintained a correspondence with him for the rest of his life. Meher Baba nicknamed Pascal as his "Phoenix" and alternately his "Black Panther."

Pascal remained in close correspondence with his master Meher Baba until the end of his life; he met with him for the last time in 1952 in Scarsdale, New York. Even in this final meeting, they discussed films which Pascal planned to produce for Meher Baba.

Thirty years before Richard Attenborough's film Gandhi, Pascal had a written agreement with Jawaharlal Nehru, the prime minister of India, to produce a movie of Gandhi's life.

== Collaborations with Shaw ==
Pascal took a ship back from India to the United States, penniless but undaunted. He landed in San Francisco where he spent some time deciding what to do next. He decided to approach playwright George Bernard Shaw, whom he had met many years earlier. During that earlier meeting Shaw, who had been impressed with the young Pascal's passion for art and cinema, had told him to pay him a visit when he was entirely penniless. Pascal sought out Shaw, first by going to New York City hidden in the toilet of a railroad train, then convincing a sea captain to give him a lift to England.

Somehow he convinced Shaw to give him the rights to his plays, beginning with Pygmalion (1938), which he released as a film. It was an enormous international hit, both critically and financially. Pascal tried to convince Shaw to let Pygmalion be turned into a musical, but the outraged Shaw explicitly forbade it, having had a bad experience with the operetta The Chocolate Soldier (based on Shaw's Arms and the Man). Pascal was the only person to convince Shaw to adjust his scripts to the new medium of cinema, gaining concessions from Shaw that no one else could. Pascal created the line for Pygmalion (later used by Lerner and Loewe in their musical version My Fair Lady) "The rain in Spain stays mainly in the plain." Shaw, who publicly was referring to Pascal as a genius, added the line into the script.

In 1938, Pascal was named as one of the world's more famous men by Time magazine, along with Adolf Hitler and the pope. He followed the film Pygmalion with Major Barbara (1941), which he directed as well as produced. Major Barbara was filmed in London during aerial bombing by the Nazis. During air raids, the crew and cast had to dodge into bomb shelters. Pascal never stopped the production, and the film was completed on schedule. Pascal became more and more extravagant: Caesar and Cleopatra (1945), the next Pascal film of a Shaw play, was the most expensive British movie ever made at that time. It was a major financial and critical flop. Pascal insisted on importing sand from Egypt to achieve the right cinematic colors for the film. In this period, Shaw had become more difficult to work with. After the success of Pygmalion, which was shortened in its transition from stage to screen, the playwright increasingly refused to let his plays be cut.

Shaw heightened his praise of Pascal during this period. He wrote in 1946:

Gabriel Pascal is one of those extraordinary men who turn up occasionally – say once in a century – and may be called godsends in the arts to which they are devoted. Pascal is doing for films what Diaghileff did for the Russian Balle...He shocks me by his utter indifference to cost; but the result justifies him; and Hollywood, which always values a director in proportion to the money he throws away, is now at his feet: for he throws it away like water. The man is a genius: That is all I have to say about him.

Pascal produced Androcles and the Lion (1952), but by this time he was suffering from cancer.

== Death ==
Pascal died of cancer in July 1954.

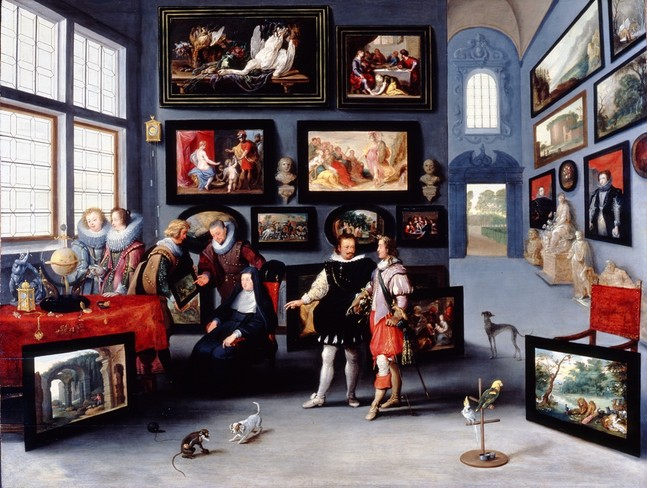
Interior of the Salon of the Archduchess Isabella of Austria, by Willem van Haecht, 1621 (donated to the Norton Museum of Art by Valerie Delacorte in memory of Pascal)
