= The Boy Is Mine =

The Boy Is Mine may refer to:

- The Boy Is Mine (album), by Monica (1998)
- "The Boy Is Mine" (Brandy and Monica song), by Brandy and Monica (1998)
- "The Boy Is Mine" (Ariana Grande song) (2024)
- The Boy Is Mine Tour (2025), by Brandy and Monica

== See also ==
- The Girl Is Mine (disambiguation)
