= Major Barbara (film) =

1941 film by Gabriel Pascal

- Directed by: Gabriel Pascal; Uncredited: Harold French; David Lean
- Written by: George Bernard Shaw; Marjorie Deans; Anatole de Grunwald
- Produced by: Gabriel Pascal
- Starring: Wendy Hiller; Rex Harrison; Robert Morley; Robert Newton
- Cinematography: Ronald Neame; Uncredited: Freddie Young
- Edited by: David Lean; Charles Frend
- Music by: William Walton
- Production company: Gabriel Pascal Productions
- Distributed by: General Film Distributors
- Release date: 2 August 1941
- Running time: 131 minutes
- Country: United Kingdom
- Language: English
- Budget: £230,000 or $800,000

Major Barbara is a 1941 British film starring Wendy Hiller and Rex Harrison. The film was produced and directed by Gabriel Pascal and edited by David Lean. It was adapted for the screen by Marjorie Deans and Anatole de Grunwald, based on the 1905 stage play Major Barbara by George Bernard Shaw. It was both a critical and a financial success.

== Plot ==
In this social satire, Barbara Undershaft (Hiller), an idealistic major in the Salvation Army, is deeply troubled by the fact that her father, Andrew Undershaft (Robert Morley), is a wealthy weapons manufacturer. Meanwhile, Andrew is looking for an heir for his industrial empire, in particular a foundling like himself.

== Cast ==
- Wendy Hiller as Major Barbara Undershaft
- Rex Harrison as Adolphus Cusins
- Robert Morley as Andrew Undershaft
- Robert Newton as Bill Walker
- Sybil Thorndike as The General
- Emlyn Williams as Snobby Price
- Miles Malleson as Morrison, the butler
- Donald Calthrop as Peter Shirley (died during filming)
- Marie Lohr as Lady Britomart
- Stanley Holloway as a Policeman
- Marie Ault as Rummy Mitchens
- Penelope Dudley-Ward as Sarah Undershaft
- Walter Hudd as Stephen Undershaft
- David Tree as Charles Lomax
- Deborah Kerr as Jenny Hill
- Torin Thatcher as Todger Fairmile
- Felix Aylmer as James
- Kathleen Harrison as Mrs. Price
- Edward Rigby as Man on Quayside

== Production ==
Major Barbara was filmed in London during The Blitz bombing of 1940. During air raids, the cast and crew repeatedly had to duck into bomb shelters. The film's producer-director, Pascal, never stopped the production and the film was completed on schedule.

According to another account the film was meant to take ten weeks but took twenty weeks. The original budget of £130,000 was insufficient to complete it so J. Arthur Rank provided £100,000 necessary. This resulted in Rank making a full commitment to investing in films.

== Reception ==
=== Box office ===
According to Kinematograph Weekly it was the sixth most popular film of 1941 in Britain, after 49th Parallel, The Great Dictator, "Pimpernel" Smith and Lady Hamilton.

=== Critical reception ===
In a contemporary review, Bosley Crowther wrote in The New York Times:

To call it a manifest triumph would be arrant stinginess with words. For this is something more than just a brilliant and adult translation of a stimulating play, something more than a captivating compound of ironic humor and pity. This is a lasting memorial to the devotion of artists working under fire, a permanent proof for posterity that it takes more than bombs to squelch the English wit. It is as wry and impudent a satire of conventional morals and social creeds as though it had been made in a time of easy and carefree peace. It is, in short, a more triumphant picture than any the British have yet sent across.

More recently, Time Out wrote, "There is plenty to relish, notably Newton and Morley hamming it up (as, respectively, the rumbustious Bill Walker and the overbearing tycoon), and Deborah Kerr in her debut; but it does tend to just sit there."

== Home media ==
Major Barbara was released on DVD by The Criterion Collection on 23 February 2010, as part of the box set George Bernard Shaw on Film.
