= Yole Marinelli =

English and Italian actress (born 1940)

- Born: 1940 (age 85–86); Naples, Italy
- Occupations: Actress, Italian translator speech artist
- Spouse(s): Brian Weske (1964 - 1970); Juerg Martin Von Moos (m. 1971)

Yole Marinelli (born 1940) is an English and Italian actress, and also Italian translator speech artist for BBC.

== Life and career ==
Marinelli, daughter of a government official in Naples, was born in Italy. She left home to study drama in Rome and made some films in Italy. She left Italy when she was only half way through her course at drama school.

She was the member of the team teaching Italian in BBC1's education series 'Si Dice Cosi' (1969), television course of 26 programmes, and in the education series 'Avventura' (1972-1973), a BBC television course of 25 programmes.

== Personal life ==
Marinelli was married to Brian Weske, film and television actor, singer, and songwriter, from 1964 to 1970. In 1971 she married Swiss-born Juerg Martin Von Moos.

== Selected filmography ==
=== Film ===
Year	Title	Role	Notes
1966	Drop Dead Darling	1st Maid	as Iole Marinelli
1969	Where's Jack?	Lady Clarissa	
1969	The Thirteen Chairs	Sybil	
1982	All My Friends Part 2	Anita Esposito	

=== Television ===
Year	Title	Role	Notes
1965	Riviera Police	Pier	Episode: "Who Can Catch a Falling Star?"
1967	The Wednesday Play	Emmanuella	Episode: "A Way with the Ladies"
1967	Vendetta	Italian Waitress	Episode: "The Desperate Man"
1967	The Avengers	Jerezina	Episode: "The £50,000 Breakfast"
1968	The Troubleshooters	Teresa Estoban	Episode: "Not for My Friend - He's Driving"
1968	The Champions	Sonia	Episode: "Desert Journey"

== See also ==
- Language education in the United Kingdom
