= Jane Welsh =

British actress (1905–2001)

- Born: 14 January 1905; Bristol, Somerset, England
- Died: 27 November 2001 (aged 96); London, England
- Occupation: Actor
- Spouse: Henry Mollison (m. 1932; div. 1934)

Jane Welsh (14 January 1905 – 27 November 2001) was a British actress. She portrayed Mrs Brown, William's mother, in the films Just William's Luck (1947) and William Comes to Town (1948).

== Selected filmography ==
- The Sleeping Cardinal (1931) - Kathleen Adair
- The Bells (1931) - Annette
- Frail Women (1932) - The Sister
- Condemned to Death (1932) - Sonia Wallington
- The Missing Rembrandt (1932) - Lady Violet Lamsden
- The Chinese Puzzle (1932) - Victoria
- Whispering Tongues (1934) - Claudia Mayland
- Spring in the Air (1934) - Rosa
- Annie, Leave the Room! (1935) - Lady Mary
- Bell-Bottom George (1944) - Rita
- Just William's Luck (1948) - Mrs. Brown
- William Comes to Town (1948) - Mrs. Brown
- The Second Mate (1950) - Mrs. Mead
- The Dragon of Pendragon Castle (1950) - Mrs. Fielding
- Mantrap (1953) - Laura
- Little Red Monkey (1955) - Supt. McCollum - sanitarium
- Another Time, Another Place (1958) - Jonesh (Last appearance)

== Television ==
Jane Welsh also appeared on British television in the 1950s, including appearances in the TV series Scotland Yard and Ivanhoe.
