= Give Her a Ring =

1934 film by Arthur B. Woods

- Clifford Mollison and Wendy Barrie in the film
- Directed by: Arthur B. Woods
- Written by: Marjorie Deans; Clifford Grey; Wolfgang Wilhelm
- Produced by: Walter C. Mycroft; Arthur B. Woods
- Starring: Wendy Barrie; Clifford Mollison; Zelma O'Neal; Bertha Belmore
- Cinematography: Claude Friese-Greene; Ronald Neame
- Edited by: Edward B. Jarvis
- Music by: Hans May
- Production company: British International Pictures
- Distributed by: Pathé Pictures International
- Release date: 11 June 1934
- Running time: 79 minutes
- Country: United Kingdom
- Language: English

Give Her a Ring (also known as Giving You the Stars) is a 1934 British musical film directed by Arthur B. Woods and starring Clifford Mollison, Wendy Barrie, and Zelma O'Neal. It was written by Marjorie Deans, Clifford Grey and Wolfgang Wilhelm. Stewart Granger made an appearance in the film, early in his career. The film was a remake of the 1932 German film Fräulein – Falsch verbunden (Wrong Number, Miss).

== Plot ==
In Copenhagen, a worker in a telephone exchange falls in love with her employer.

== Cast ==
- Wendy Barrie as Karen Svenson
- Clifford Mollison as Paul Hendrick
- Zelma O'Neal as Trude Olsen
- Bertha Belmore as Miss Hoffman
- Erik Rhodes as Otto Brune
- Olive Blakeney as Mrs. Brune
- Syd Crossley as Gustav
- Jimmy Godden as Uncle Rifkin
- Richard Hearne as drunk
- Nadine March as Karen's friend
- Pat Fitzpatrick as boy
- Stewart Granger as diner

== Reception ==
The Daily Film Renter wrote: "Presented with considerable directorial ingenuity, pepped up with amusing comedy and tuneful songs, film staged in lavish settings that include mammoth night club of artistic design. Zelma O'Neal scores triumph as gold-digging shop-girl, Clifford Mollison and Wendy Barrie making personable leads."

Picture Show wrote: "Clifford Mollison as Paul gives a lively and spirited performance, and is cleverly supported by Wendy Barrie, who gives a first-rate interpretation of her part as Karen."
