= Reginald Tate =

English actor (1896–1955)

- Reginald Tate in the television series The Quatermass Experiment (1953)
- Born: 13 December 1896; Garforth, West Riding of Yorkshire, England
- Died: 23 August 1955 (aged 58); Putney, London, England
- Years active: 1922–1955

Reginald Tate (13 December 1896 – 23 August 1955) was an English actor and a veteran of many roles on stage, in films and on television. He is remembered best as the first actor to play the television science-fiction character Professor Bernard Quatermass, in the 1953 BBC Television serial The Quatermass Experiment.

== Early life ==
Reginald Tate was born in Garforth, near Leeds in the West Riding of Yorkshire, and went to school in York. During the First World War he served with the Northamptonshire Regiment and later with the Royal Flying Corps. He left the armed forces after the end of the war and studied acting at Leeds College of Music and Drama. He made his first professional acting appearance at Leeds Art Theatre in 1922, and for the next four years was a resident performer both there and at the city's Little Theatre.

In 1926, Tate moved to London, with his first major role being in a production of Romeo and Juliet at the Strand Theatre. He had particular success with the lead role of Stanhope in R. C. Sherriff's play Journey's End, playing the part in a 1929 tour of Australia and New Zealand and again for a 1934 revival production at the Criterion Theatre in London.

== Film and television career ==
Tate made his film debut in 1934 in Whispering Tongues, and later in the decade also began to appear in the newer medium of television. On 11 November 1937, Tate appeared as Stanhope again in a production of Journey's End made by the BBC's fledgling television service, one of its earliest major drama productions. His performance was praised by the television critic of The Times newspaper, who wrote that: "his performance [was] brilliantly full of fiery disillusionment. It successfully dominated the stage—no easy matter when Osborne is played as well as Mr. Basil Gill played him."

At the beginning of the Second World War Tate joined the Royal Air Force Volunteer Reserve. He was given the rank of pilot officer, and by the time his service came to an end in 1944 he had been promoted to squadron leader. He also continued to act during the war, and performed small roles in the well-known films The Life and Death of Colonel Blimp (1943) and The Way Ahead (1944). He also had a top supporting role as the intelligence officer, Major Richards, in another classic British war movie, The Next of Kin (1942).

After the end of the war Tate continued to perform for theatre and increasingly for television. He met the Austrian television director Rudolph Cartier when Cartier cast him in his BBC production of It Is Midnight, Dr Schweitzer in February 1953. Cartier was impressed with Tate's performance, and later that year offered him the lead role in The Quatermass Experiment, a science-fiction serial he was directing, written by BBC staff scriptwriter Nigel Kneale. Tate was the second choice for the part of Professor Bernard Quatermass; Cartier had previously offered it to his co-star It Is Midnight, Dr Schweitzer, André Morell, who declined the role. Morell would later play Quatermass for the third instalment of the series, Quatermass and the Pit. Tate however was a success in the part, and in a 1986 interview Nigel Kneale named him as his favourite of all the actors to have played the character. The serial itself was also a success, with the British Film Institute later describing it as "one of the most influential series of the 1950s." Tate took an increased interest in television, and later in 1953 enrolled on the BBC's staff training course to become a television producer. He also began to spend much of his spare time teaching acting classes at the Royal Academy of Dramatic Art (RADA), feeling that he had experience which might be useful to younger actors.

== Death ==
When the BBC commissioned a second Quatermass serial in 1955, Tate was eager to participate and play the Professor again. Production was due to begin in September, and on 7 August 1955 he produced his first television play, Night Was Our Friend. Only sixteen days after this, late at night on 23 August, he collapsed outside his home in London. He had suffered a heart attack, and despite being rushed to hospital in Putney he died soon afterwards.

== Selected filmography ==
- Tangled Evidence (1934) – Ellaby
- Whispering Tongues (1934) – Alan Norton
- The Riverside Murder (1935) – Hubert Perrin
- The Phantom Light (1935) – Tom Evans
- The Man Behind the Mask (1936) – Allan Hayden
- Dark Journey (1937) – Mate of Q-Boat
- For Valour (1937) – Chester
- Too Dangerous to Live (1939) – Collins
- Poison Pen (1939) – Rev. Rider
- It Happened to One Man (1940) – Ackroyd
- The Next of Kin (1942) – Maj. Richards
- The Life and Death of Colonel Blimp (1943) – van Zijl
- The Way Ahead (1944) – The Training Company Commanding Officer
- Madonna of the Seven Moons (1945) – Ackroyd
- The Man from Morocco (1945) – Ricardi
- Journey Together (1945) – Commanding Officer, Initial Training Wing
- So Well Remembered (1947) – Trevor Mangin
- Uncle Silas (1947) – Austin Ruthyn
- Noose (1948) – Editor
- Diamond City (1949) – Longdon
- Midnight Episode (1950) – Inspector Lucas
- Secret People (1952) – Inspector Eliot
- The Story of Robin Hood and His Merrie Men (1952) – Hugh Fitzooth
- Escape Route (1952) – Colonel Wilkes
- Malta Story (1953) – Vice Adm Payne
- King's Rhapsody (1955) – King Peter
- Hotel Incident (1962) – Brown – the Commander (final film role)
