= The Secret Garden (1949 film) =

1949 film by Fred M. Wilcox

- Theatrical release poster
- Directed by: Fred M. Wilcox
- Screenplay by: Robert Ardrey
- Based on: The Secret Garden a 1911 novel by Frances Hodgson Burnett
- Produced by: Clarence Brown
- Starring: Margaret O'Brien; Herbert Marshall; Dean Stockwell; Gladys Cooper; Elsa Lanchester; Brian Roper; Reginald Owen
- Cinematography: Ray June
- Edited by: Robert J. Kern
- Music by: Bronislau Kaper (composer); André Previn (direction/supervision)
- Production company: Metro-Goldwyn-Mayer
- Distributed by: Loew's Inc.
- Release date: April 30, 1949
- Running time: 92 minutes
- Country: United States
- Language: English
- Budget: $1,432,000
- Box office: $993,000

The Secret Garden is a 1949 American drama film directed by Fred M. Wilcox and produced by Metro-Goldwyn-Mayer (MGM). Adapted from the classic 1911 novel by Frances Hodgson Burnett, The Secret Garden is the second film adaptation following a silent version released in 1919. The film stars Margaret O'Brien, Herbert Marshall, Dean Stockwell, Gladys Cooper, Elsa Lanchester, Brian Roper, and Reginald Owen. It centers on a young orphan who is thrust into the dark and mysterious lives of her widowed uncle and his disabled son when she comes to live with them in their isolated country house in Yorkshire, England.

While the film is primarily shot in black-and-white, the three scenes set in the restored garden of the title were filmed in Technicolor. The film was released on DVD on May 7, 2013, as part of the Warner Archive Collection.

== Plot ==
In British India, two officers locate Mary Lennox, a recently orphaned girl, whose parents have died during a cholera epidemic. She boards a ship to Yorkshire, England, to stay with her widowed uncle Archibald Craven at Misselthwaite Manor. Mrs. Medlock, Craven's housekeeper, escorts Mary to the mansion, informing her that her uncle will not be seeing her. Mary hears loud crying outside her room, but Mrs. Medlock forbids her from lurking around the manor. When Mary questions these orders, Mrs. Medlock locks her inside her room.

The next morning, Mary meets Martha Sowerby, a maid who refuses to obey Mary's demands, responding with incessant laughter. Outside, Mary meets Martha's young brother Dickon, who has befriended a raven. He tells Mary about a secret garden surrounded by a high, vine-covered wall with a locked door, to which Craven has buried the key. Later that night, Mary meets her uncle, who is prepared to leave for London. Mary asks Craven about a painting, and is told the subject of the portrait was his wife, who died ten years earlier.

The next day, Mary meets Ben Weatherstaff, a gardener, and learns the garden has been kept locked for the past ten years. Shortly after, the raven unearths the buried key, which Mary hides in her pocket. That night, Mary locates the bedroom of Colin Craven, Archibald's son and Mary's cousin, who has been a sickly invalid his entire life. Colin confesses he throws tantrums, and states his father barely sees him, as he fears Colin will die soon. Behind a curtain in Colin's room there is another painting of Craven's wife, and Colin states his mother died after a tree branch fell on her.

In the morning, Mary and Dickon discover the door to the secret garden hidden behind the vines on its encircling wall. Finding the garden neglected, with the branch that accidentally killed Craven's wife still where it landed ten years ago, they set to work reviving the garden, and Colin becomes jealous of the time Mary is spending with Dickon. On the day she sees her first daffodil, Mary visits Colin during a tantrum and is able to calm him down, and she brings Dickon to see him the next day.

Craven sends Dr. Fortescue to consult on Colin's case, and the London physician disagrees with the local doctor's diagnosis, believing the boy just needs fresh air and new friends, and suggesting the iron braces placed on Colin's legs be removed. Overhearing this, Mary and Dickon take Colin to the secret garden in a wheelchair, which is full of colorful flowers. Craven resents Fortescue for his medical report, but the doctor accuses Craven of wallowing in grief, which is affecting Colin's physical health.

One day, Ben locates the children inside the garden and demands they leave, as Craven has returned to Misselthwaite. That night, Craven enters Colin's bedroom and tells him that he plans to sell the estate and move to Italy, which upsets Colin. The next morning, Craven meets with the buyer, who mentions he climbed Ben's ladder to look in the secret garden. Craven is in disbelief when told there is anything but weeds within the walls, and he races to verify the report, catching the children inside. Colin rises from his wheelchair and takes a few unsteady steps toward his father. The two embrace, and the buyer, who witnessed the touching moment, tears up his check for the estate.

== Cast ==
- Margaret O'Brien as Mary Lennox
- Herbert Marshall as Archibald Craven
- Dean Stockwell as Colin Craven
- Gladys Cooper as Mrs. Medlock
- Elsa Lanchester as Martha Sowerby
- Brian Roper as Dickon Sowerby
- Reginald Owen as Ben Weatherstaff
- Aubrey Mather as Dr. Griddlestone
- George Zucco as Dr. Fortescue
- Lowell Gilmore as British Officer
- Billy Bevan as Barney
- Dennis Hoey as Mr. Pitcher
- Mathew Boulton as Mr. Bromley
- Isobel Elsom as Governess
- Norma Varden as Nurse
- Kathryn Beaumont as Muriel (uncredited)

== Production ==
MGM announced the film in November 1946, intending it to be a vehicle for Claude Jarman Jr. and directed by Clarence Brown, who had just collaborated on The Yearling (1946). However, by July 1948, Dean Stockwell had joined the cast opposite Margaret O'Brien, with Clarence Brown as producer, and Fred M. Wilcox replacing Brown as director.

== Reception ==
=== Box office ===
According to MGM records, The Secret Garden earned $610,000 in the US and Canada and $383,000 overseas, resulting in a loss of $848,000.

=== Critical reaction ===
Variety described The Secret Garden as "a highly unusual picture" that "deserves a gold star on that basis, at least. But the vaguely allegorical story is confused in appeal and the result is a top-quality production stand-point that will be spotty at the [box office]." Harrison's Reports wrote: "Despite its many good touches, however, the picture is handicapped by a story that is too involved and too hazy in its psychological overtones, and by too much conversation, slowing up the action."

Margarita Landazuri, in an article for Turner Classic Movies (TCM), wrote that, at the time of release, many critics "felt, as did the Variety critic, that 'the allegorical and psychological implications that have been carried over from Frances Hodgson Burnett's book are clearly for the grown-up trade. Not only that, but a good bit of the production is designed to create eerie terror that may discourage parents from letting moppets see the pic.' In this era when even the youngest 'moppets' take Harry Potter in stride, however, such criticism seems quaint, and The Secret Garden seems ahead of its time."

In a retrospective review, Leonard Maltin, in his Classic Movie Guide, gave the film three out of four stars, stating it is a "vividly atmospheric film with some color sequences."
