= Hugh Cross =

British actor (1925–1989)

- in Seven Days to Noon (1950)
- Born: Cecil Hugh Cross; 24 September 1925; London, England, UK
- Died: 14 May 1989 (aged 63); Blackheath, Surrey, England, UK
- Years active: 1943–1989

Hugh Cross (24 September 1925 – 14 May 1989) was a British television and film actor.

== Selected filmography ==
- Just William's Luck (1947)
- William Comes to Town (1948)
- Warning to Wantons (1949)
- Seven Days to Noon (1950)
- Svengali (1954)
- The Court Martial of Major Keller (1961)
- Highway to Battle (1961)

== Television ==
- Emergency Ward 10 (1959)
- The Human Jungle (1963)
- The Flaxton Boys (1970) - Archie Weekes (Series 2)
- Just William (1977 TV series) - Mr Brown
- The Gaffer (TV series) - Colonel Cross ('Moonlight and Ruses ', episode, series 3)
