= 1950 in the United Kingdom =

Events from the year 1950 in the United Kingdom.

== Incumbents ==
- Monarch – George VI
- Prime Minister – Clement Attlee (Labour)

== Events ==
- 12 January – Submarine HMS Truculent (P315) sinks after collision in the Thames Estuary with 64 deaths (mostly from hypothermia) and 20 survivors.
- 16 January – The BBC Light Programme first airs the daily children's radio feature Listen with Mother.
- 26 January
  - India becomes a republic, severing constitutional ties with the United Kingdom and other dominions.
  - Donald Hume is sentenced to imprisonment as an accessory to the murder of Stanley Setty, having dumped his dismembered body over the Essex marshes from a light aircraft.
- 8 February – George Kelly is sentenced to hang for the murder of the Cameo cinema manager in the Liverpool suburb of Wavertree, a conviction which will be quashed as unsafe fifty-three years later.
- 20 February – Ealing Studios release the film The Blue Lamp, introducing the character PC George Dixon, played by Jack Warner (with Dirk Bogarde as a young criminal). The film has the highest audiences in Britain for a British film this year.
- 21 February – Cunard liner RMS Aquitania arrives at the scrapyard in Faslane at the end of a 36-year career.
- 23 February – 1950 general election: Labour, led by Clement Attlee, win a second term in government, though with a parliamentary majority of just five seats, a stark contrast to the 146-seat majority gained in 1945. Their popularity took a plunge last year following the devaluation of the pound and the failure of the East African groundnuts scheme, with many recent opinion polls showing a comfortable Conservative lead. Among the lost Labour seats is Bexley in Kent which 33-year-old Conservative Party candidate Edward Heath seizes from Ashley Bramall. Both Communist Party MP's lose their seats. Voter turnout is 83.9%, an all-time high for a UK general election under universal suffrage. This is the first Parliamentary election at which plural voting is not permitted. University constituencies have been abolished at the dissolution. Postal voting is available to civilians for the first time. BBC Television airs its first election results programme, however no footage survives due to it being broadcast live and not recorded.
- 1 March – German-born theoretical physicist Klaus Fuchs, working at Harwell Atomic Energy Research Establishment, is convicted following a confession of supplying secret information about the atomic bomb to the Soviet Union.
- 6–8 March – The World Figure Skating Championships are held in London.
- 8 March
  - Carmaker Rover tests a revolutionary new turbine-powered concept car.
  - Release of comedy film The Happiest Days of Your Life starring Alastair Sim and Margaret Rutherford.
- 9 March – Welsh-born Timothy Evans, aged 25, is hanged by Albert Pierrepoint at HM Prison Pentonville in London for the murder of his baby daughter (and, by imputation, his wife) at their residence at 10 Rillington Place in Notting Hill, London. 3 years later, his downstairs neighbour John Christie is found to be a serial killer of at least seven women at this address. Evans is posthumously pardoned in 1966.
- 12 March – Llandow air disaster: eighty of the eighty-three passengers (returning from a rugby match in Ireland) on board an Avro Tudor V aircraft are killed when it crashes on approach to Llandow in the Vale of Glamorgan, making it the world's worst air disaster at this time.
- 16 March – The Gambols comic strip first appears in the Daily Express.
- c. April? – The best-selling Kenwood Chef food mixer is first introduced.
- 1 April – Corby, a village in Northamptonshire, is designated as the first new town in central England, providing homes for up to 40,000 people by the 1960s.
- 14 April – The Eagle comic first appears, featuring Dan Dare and Captain Pugwash.
- 29 April – Arsenal F.C. win the FA Cup with a 2–0 win over Liverpool at Wembley Stadium.
- 13 May – First Grand Prix held at Silverstone.
- 20 May – The first package holiday air charter, by Vladimir Raitz of Horizon Holidays, from Gatwick Airport to Calvi, Corsica, for camping.
- 21 May – A tornado tracks across England from Wendover to Blakeney, Norfolk (68 miles (109 km)), the longest ever such track in Britain.
- 26 May – Motor fuel rationing comes to an end after eleven years, marking another stage in the phasing-out of rationing that was introduced in the wake of World War II.
- 6 June – The BBC Light Programme first airs the popular radio comedy feature Educating Archie.
- 7 June – The pilot episode of the agricultural soap opera The Archers airs on BBC Radio. The series proper begins in January 1951 and will still be running more than 75 years later.
- 24 June – World Cup opens in Brazil with the England national football team competing for the first time.
- 28 June – In the World Cup, the England national football team is humiliated by losing 1–0 to the United States in Belo Horizonte.
- 29 June – The England cricket team loses the Test Match by 326 runs to the West Indies at Lord's, an event commemorated in Lord Beginner's calypso Victory Test Match.
- 11 July – The first broadcast of the popular BBC Television pre-school children's programme Andy Pandy.
- 19 July – Release of the film Treasure Island made in England with Robert Newton as Long John Silver.
- 28 July – Shops Act 1950 (coming into effect 1 October) consolidates legislation on shop closing hours, employment conditions and Sunday trading.
- 31 July
  - Sainsbury's opens the first purpose-built supermarket in Croydon.
  - Warwickshire's Eric Hollies beats Nobby Clark's record of 65 innings without reaching double figures when dismissed for 7 against Worcestershire. Hollies will eventually make it 71 before scoring 14 against Nottinghamshire on 16 August.
- 15 August – Elizabeth II Duchess of Edinburgh gives birth to her and her husband, The Duke of Edinburgh's second child and only daughter.
- 19 August – The Football League season begins with four new members, taking membership from 88 to 92 across the four divisions. The new members are Colchester United, Gillingham (who lost their league status in 1938), Scunthorpe & Lindsey United and Shrewsbury Town.
- 24 August – Vale Park football stadium opens in Stoke-on-Trent, to serve Port Vale F.C. It has an initial capacity of more than 30,000 and it had been billed as the "Wembley of the North" when first proposed, but high costs mean that the new stadium is much more basic than had been planned.
- 27 August – The BBC makes its first television broadcast from the European continent.
- 29 August
  - 4,000 British troops are sent to Korea.
  - The Duchess of Edinburgh and The Duke of Edinburgh's fourteen-day-old daughter is named as Anne Elizabeth Alice Louise. She is known at this time as Princess Anne of Edinburgh and later as The Princess Royal.
- 8 September – 116 miners are trapped underground in a landslide at Knockshinnoch Castle colliery at New Cumnock in Ayrshire, Scotland.
- 9 September
  - Post-war soap rationing ends.
  - The first miners are rescued from Knockshinnoch Castle colliery.
- 11 September – The rescue operation from Knockshinnoch Castle colliery is completed, with all 116 miners saved.
- 26 September – 80 miners are killed underground in a machinery fire at Cresswell colliery in Derbyshire.
- 1 October – Full-time military service by conscripted National Servicemen is extended to two years.
- 18 October – The North of Scotland Hydro-Electric Board's Loch Sloy Hydro-Electric Scheme is inaugurated.
- 25 October – The Festival Ballet, later to become the English National Ballet, founded as a touring company by English dancers Alicia Markova and Anton Dolin, makes its debut performance.
- 26 October – The rebuilt House of Commons, following its destruction by bombing in World War II, is used for the first time.
- October
  - Alan Turing's paper "Computing machinery and intelligence", proposing the Turing test, is published in Mind.
  - A group of Conservative politicians publishes the tract One Nation: a Tory approach to social policy.
- November – An attempt to hold the Second World Peace Congress at Sheffield City Hall is thwarted by the British authorities preventing many international delegates from entering the country and it is relocated to Warsaw.
- 5 November – The BBC Light Programme first airs Life with the Lyons, the UK's first sitcom, featuring British-domiciled American couple Bebe Daniels and Ben Lyon.
- 28 November – James Corbitt is hanged at Strangeways Prison, Manchester, for the premeditated murder in August of his mistress at Ashton-under-Lyne. He is well acquainted with his executioner, Albert Pierrepoint, from Pierrepoint's other calling as a pub landlord in Oldham.
- 10 December
  - Bertrand Russell wins the Nobel Prize in Literature "in recognition of his varied and significant writings in which he champions humanitarian ideals and freedom of thought".
  - Cecil Frank Powell wins the Nobel Prize in Physics "for his development of the photographic method of studying nuclear processes and his discoveries regarding mesons made with this method".
- 25 December – The Stone of Scone, the traditional coronation stone of Scottish monarchs, English monarchs and more recently British monarchs, is stolen from London's Westminster Abbey by a group of four Scottish students with nationalist beliefs. It turns up in Scotland on 11 April 1951.
- 28 December – An order to designate the Peak District as the first of the National parks of the United Kingdom is submitted to the Minister of Town and Country Planning for approval.

=== Undated ===
- Ysgol Syr Thomas Jones opens in Amlwch on Anglesey as Britain's first purpose-built comprehensive school.
- Construction of Shoeburyness Boom, a Cold War submarine defensive boom across the Thames Estuary, begins.

== Publications ==
- Agatha Christie's Miss Marple novel A Murder is Announced.
- Catherine Cookson's first novel Kate Hannigan.
- William Cooper's novel Scenes from Provincial Life.
- Marion Crawford's royal biography The Little Princesses: the Story of the Queen's Childhood by her Nanny.
- Elizabeth David's recipe book A Book of Mediterranean Food.
- C. S. Forester's historical novel Mr. Midshipman Hornblower.
- Doris Lessing's novel The Grass is Singing.
- C. S. Lewis's novel The Lion, the Witch and the Wardrobe, first of The Chronicles of Narnia series (16 October).
- Mervyn Peake's novel Gormenghast, second of the eponymous series.
- Barbara Pym's novel Some Tame Gazelle.
- Evelyn Waugh's novel Helena.

== Births ==
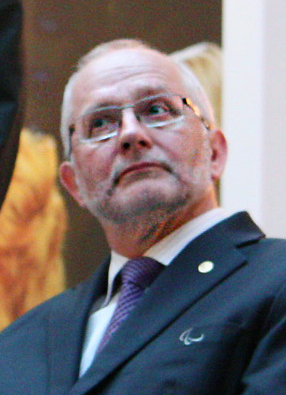
Philip Craven

- 1 January – Chris Black, Scottish hammer thrower
- 2 January – Angela Gallop, forensic scientist
- 5 January – Malcolm Hardee, comedian (died 2005)
- 7 January – Malcolm Macdonald, footballer and manager
- 9 January – Alec Jeffreys, geneticist
- 19 January – David Tredinnick, politician
- 1 February – John Bowe, actor
- 3 February – Pamela Franklin, actress
- 13 February – Peter Gabriel, musician
- 16 February – Peter Hain, politician
- 19 February – Andy Powell, rock guitarist (Wishbone Ash)
- 22 February – Julie Walters, English actress
- 25 February – Tony Lloyd, politician (died 2024)
- 4 March
  - Wendy Dagworthy, fashion designer
  - Ken Robinson, educationalist (died 2020)
- 5 March – Henry Marsh, neurosurgeon
- 22 March – Jocky Wilson, Scottish darts player (died 2012)
- 27 March – Terry Yorath, footballer and football manager (died 2026)
- 29 March – Richard Feilden, architect (died 2005)
- 30 March – Robbie Coltrane, Scottish actor and comedian (died 2022)
- 3 April – Sally Thomsett, actress
- 19 April – Julia Cleverdon, charity worker
- 20 April – Robert Mair, engineer and academic
- 22 April
  - Peter Frampton, rock singer-songwriter
  - Jancis Robinson, wine writer
- 1 May – Danny McGrain, footballer
- 3 May – Mary Hopkin, singer
- 11 May – Jeremy Paxman, television presenter and author
- 12 May
  - Helena Kennedy, Baroness Kennedy of The Shaws, barrister and politician
  - Jenni Murray, radio presenter (died 2026)
- 13 May – Danny Kirwan, guitarist and singer (died 2018)
- 15 May – Keith Mills, businessman
- 17 May – Alan Johnson, politician
- 22 May
  - Mary Tamm, actress (died 2012)
  - Bernie Taupin, songwriter
- 23 May – Martin McGuinness, Irish republican politician and soldier (died 2017)
- 1 June – Tom Robinson, singer and musician
- 2 June
  - Jonathan Evans, Welsh lawyer and politician
  - Anne Phillips, theorist and academic
- 5 June – Paul Flowers, Labour politician and non-executive chairman of The Co-operative Bank
- 12 June – Michael Fabricant, politician
- 13 June – Nick Brown, politician
- 14 June – Rowan Williams, Archbishop of Canterbury
- 20 June – Rita Rae, Lady Rae, Scottish judge
- 30 June
  - Olly Flynn, race walker
  - Leonard Whiting, actor
- 4 July – Philip Craven, 2nd President of the International Paralympic Committee
- 6 July
  - Geraldine James, actress
  - Jonathon Porritt, English environmentalist and academic
- 8 July – Sarah Kennedy, television presenter
- 14 July – Bruce Oldfield, fashion designer
- 18 July – Richard Branson, entrepreneur
- 19 July
  - Simon Cadell, actor (died 1996)
  - Adrian Noble, theatre director
- 23 July
  - Len McCluskey, trade unionist
  - Paul Patrick, gay rights activist (died 2008)
- 26 July – Susan George, actress
- 27 July – Simon Jones, actor
- 30 July – Harriet Harman, politician
- 13 August – Jane Carr, actress
- 15 August – Anne, Princess Royal
- 18 August – Dennis Elliott, drummer
- 20 August – Andrew Downes, composer (died 2023)
- 21 August – Cindy Buxton, wildlife filmmaker
- 28 August – Tony Husband, cartoonist (died 2023)
- 30 August – Antony Gormley, sculptor
- 11 September – Barry Sheene, motorcycle racer (died 2003 in Australia)
- 14 September – Paul Kossoff, blues rock guitarist (Free) (died 1976)
- 21 September – Charles Clarke, politician
- 24 September – Harriet Walter, actress
- 27 September – Linda Lewis, pop singer (died 2023)
- 28 September – Brian Keenan, Northern Irish writer and hostage
- 1 October – Susan Greenfield, Baroness Greenfield, scientist and life peer
- 5 October – Eddie Clarke, heavy metal guitarist (Motörhead) (died 2018)
- 22 October – Harry Gration, broadcaster and journalist (died 2022)
- 25 October – Steve Barry, race walker
- 27 October – A. N. Wilson, writer
- 14 November – Sarah Radclyffe, production manager and producer
- 17 November – Colin Fletcher, suffragan bishop
- 26 November – Davey Graham, guitarist (died 2008)
- 6 December – Helen Liddell, politician
- 10 December – Nicky Henderson, horse trainer
- 14 December – Vicki Michelle, actress
- 20 December – Geoffrey Grimmett, mathematician and academic
- 21 December – David Thacker, director and screenwriter
- 28 December – Clifford Cocks, cryptographer
- 31 December – Phil Blakeway, English rugby player

== Deaths ==
- 21 January – George Orwell, author (born 1903)
- 9 March – Timothy Evans, victim of wrongful execution (born 1924)
- 19 March – Sir Norman Haworth, chemist, Nobel Prize laureate (born 1883)
- 24 March – Harold Laski, political theorist and economist (born 1893)
- 30 March – Joe Yule, Scottish-born comedian (born 1894)
- 19 April – Edward Unwin, Victoria Cross recipient (born 1864)
- 2 August – Nina Boucicault, actress (born 1867)
- 17 August – Sir Francis Lindley, diplomat (born 1872)
- 6 September – Olaf Stapledon, author and philosopher (born 1886)
- 21 September – Arthur Milne, physicist (born 1896)
- 2 November – George Bernard Shaw, playwright (born 1856)
- 12 November – Julia Marlowe, English-American actress (born 1865)
- 23 November – Percival Mackey, pianist, composer and bandleader (born 1894)
- 28 November – James Corbitt, murderer (born 1913)

== See also ==
- 1950 in British music
- 1950 in British television
- List of British films of 1950
