= Drop Dead Darling =

1966 British-American film by Ken Hughes

- Theatrical release poster
- Directed by: Ken Hughes
- Screenplay by: Ken Hughes
- Story by: Ken Hughes; Ronald Harwood
- Based on: Novel The Careful Man by Richard Deming
- Produced by: Ken Hughes; Richard McWhorter; Greg Morrison executive Ray Stark
- Starring: Tony Curtis; Rosanna Schiaffino
- Cinematography: Denys N. Coop
- Edited by: John Shirley
- Music by: Dennis Farnon
- Production company: Seven Arts Pictures
- Distributed by: Paramount Pictures
- Release date: 12 February 1967
- Running time: 100 minutes
- Countries: United Kingdom; United States
- Language: English

Drop Dead Darling (US title: Arrivederci, Baby!) is a 1966 British-American black comedy film directed by Ken Hughes and starring Tony Curtis, Rosanna Schiaffino, Lionel Jeffries and Zsa Zsa Gabor.

== Plot ==
A man goes around marrying wealthy women, and then getting rid of them. But over time, things don't always go as planned.

== Cast ==
- Tony Curtis as Nick Johnson
- Rosanna Schiaffino as Francesca
- Lionel Jeffries as Parker
- Zsa Zsa Gabor as Gigi
- Nancy Kwan as Baby
- Fenella Fielding as Fenella
- Anna Quayle as Aunt Miriam
- Warren Mitchell as Conte de Rienz / Maximillian
- Mischa Auer as Romeo
- Noel Purcell as Capt. O'Flannery
- Alan Gifford as American brasshat
- Joseph Fürst as German brasshat
- Monti DeLyle as butler
- Bernard Spear as French inspector
- Eileen Way as Italian dressmaker
- Bruno Barnabe as head waiter
- Gábor Baraker as Gypsy Baron
- Tony Baron as Baby's boyfriend
- Eunice Black as matron
- John Brandon as radio engineer
- Windsor Davies as radio engineer
- Franco De Rosa as Romano
- John Fordyce as boy in orphanage
- Yole Marinelli as first maid
- Miki Iveria as second maid
- Henri Vidon as priest
- Raymond Young as photographer
- Jacqueline Bisset as dancer

== Production ==
In May 1962 Joshua Logan announced he would make a film about a wife killer called The Careful Man based on an Edmund Morris from an original story by Max Franklin. The film would be done with Seven Arts Pictures and Logan would produce and direct. It was described as a suspense melodrama.

In July 1962 Seven Arts announced The Careful Man would be one of 20 films it would make with MGM.

Filming started in August 1965 under the title You Just Kill Me with Ken Hughes as a director and Tony Curtis as star. Curtis said he took the job "because of the excellent script by Ken Hughes."

Other working titles were You're Dead Right and My Last Duchess.

Zsa Zsa Gabor's casting was announced in October.

Filming took place in London at Shepperton Studios and in Cannes. Curtis said he was romantically interested in all his leading ladies but did not have affairs with any.

Curtis later said, "the problem with the picture was that it was disjointed. The individual scenes were funny but the production company couldn't figure out a way to link them all together."

== Critical reception ==
The Monthly Film Bulletin wrote: "We have seen all this before, many times, but Ken Hughes brings fresh wit to a hackneyed theme and drives the whole thing along in dashing style. The result is entertaining enough for those who like their comedy in the worst possible taste. Each of Nick's marriages is treated as a sort of revue sketch, in flashback, and each of the ladies (Anna Quayle, Zsa Zsa Gabor and Fenella Fielding) does her turn with enjoyable verve. Anna Quayle's ascent in a puff of blue smoke from her grotesque Art Nouveau drawing room is a collector's piece of its kind, and as long as the note is relentlessly farcical all is well. But it all turns a little slow and sour towards the end, largely because Rosanna Schiaffino, for all her sparkling beauty, is no comedienne. Fortunately the film recovers in the last in few minutes, when Hughes shows the happy couple in a burlesque of the familiar all-screaming Italian drama, yelling at each other in a poverty-stricken hovel all squalling brats and steaming spaghetti."

The Los Angeles Times called it "cleverly sketched".

Filmink called it "a frantic farce".
