= Ivan Craig =

British actor (1912–1995)

- Craig in 1936
- Born: Walter Ivan Sackville Craig; 22 February 1912; Edinburgh, Scotland
- Died: 7 March 1995 (aged 83); Surrey, England
- Occupation: Actor
- Years active: 1934–1962
- Spouse: Lilian May Davies (m. 1940; div. 1947)

Walter Ivan Sackville Craig (22 February 1912 – 7 March 1995) was a British actor, of Scottish descent, the son of Dr. Eric S. Craig and Dorothy Gertrude Craig (née Meldrum).

Ivan Craig was born in Edinburgh. In 1940 he married Lilian May Davies, a fashion model, who later became Princess Lilian, Duchess of Halland. Soon after marrying they were separated by World War II, when Craig was drafted into the army and posted to North Africa. They divorced amicably on 7 November 1947.

== Filmography ==
- Just William's Luck (1948) - The Boss' Gang
- Panic at Madame Tussaud's (1948) - Anthony Carter
- William Comes to Town (1948) - 1st Carter
- Murder at the Windmill (1949) - Policeman #2
- Skimpy in the Navy (1949) - (uncredited)
- Miss Pilgrim's Progress (1949) - Town Planner (uncredited)
- You Can't Fool an Irishman (1949) - (uncredited)
- High Jinks in Society (1949) - Watkins' Accomplice (uncredited)
- A Matter of Murder (1949) - Tony
- The Body Said No! (1950) - Derek
- Dangerous Assignment (1950) - Frank Mayer
- A Tale of Five Cities (1951)
- The Six Men (1951) - Wainwright
- The Story of Robin Hood and His Merrie Men (1952) - Merry man.
- Girdle of Gold (1952) - Hotel Detective
- Stryker of the Yard (1953)
- Hell Below Zero (1954) - Larsen
- Profile (1954) - Jerry Haymer
- The Devil's Jest (1954) - Maj. Seton
- A Prize of Gold (1955) - British Major
- The Flying Eye (1955) - Mayer
- Man of the Moment (1955) - Miguel (uncredited)
- Robbery with Violence (1958) - Peter Frayne
- Jackpot (1960) - Dinty

== Television ==
- The Gay Cavalier (1957) - Major Mould.
- Ivanhoe (1958) - Lord Blackheath.

== Stage ==
- Lady Precious Stream (1934/5) - Reader (Little Theatre transferring to the Savoy)
- The Rose Without a Thorn (1933/4) - Paris (Duke of York's transferring to Vaudeville)
- Murder Happens by Arnold Ridley (1950) (Gateway Theatre, London)
