= Marjorie Deans =

British screenwriter (1901–1982)

- Born: 1 December 1901; London, England
- Died: 1982 (aged 80–81)
- Occupations: Screenwriter and film director
- Years active: 1934–1962

Marjorie Deans (1 December 1901 – 1982) was a British screenwriter and film director. During the 1930s she worked on a number of films for British International Pictures.

== Selected filmography ==
- The Rise of Catherine the Great (1934)
- The Great Defender (1934)
- Give Her a Ring (1934)
- Royal Cavalcade (1935)
- Drake of England (1935)
- A Star Fell from Heaven (1936)
- Living Dangerously (1936)
- Ourselves Alone (1936)
- Aren't Men Beasts! (1937)
- Kathleen Mavourneen (1938)
- Major Barbara (1941)
- Talk About Jacqueline (1942)
- Woman to Woman (1947)
- The Girl Who Couldn't Quite (1950)
- The Girl Is Mine (1950)

== Bibliography ==
- Harper, Sue. Women in British Cinema: Mad, Bad and Dangerous to Know. Continuum International Publishing Group, 2000.
