= Edward d'Evry =

Edouard (Edward) d'Evry FRCO, FTCL (6 June 1869 — 25 December 1950) was an organist and composer. He was Assistant Organist of the Brompton Oratory, London from 1893 to 1899, and Organist there from 1899 to 1935.

He preceded Ralph Downes as Organist of the Brompton Oratory and wrote a number of pieces for organ in varying styles over a period of more than 50 years. He was also Controller of Examinations for the Trinity College of Music in London. His choral setting of O sacrum convivium is often performed to this day.
