= Mr. Pastry's Progress =

British TV comedy series (1950–1951, 1962)

- Genre: Sitcom
- Written by: James Cairncross; Richard Hearne
- Starring: Richard Hearne; Barbara Hicks
- Country of origin: United Kingdom
- Original language: English
- No. of series: 1
- No. of episodes: 6

Production
- Producer: David Goddard
- Running time: 25 minutes
- Production company: BBC

Original release
- Network: BBC 1
- Release: 31 December 1950 – 4 February 1951

Mr. Pastry's Progress is a British comedy television series that originally aired on the BBC from 1950 to 1951. Richard Hearne appeared as his character Mr. Pastry. The original series featured fifteen minute episodes, which was broadcast live. It later returned for a 1962 series of the same title. It lasted for six episodes, and co-starred Barbara Hicks.

== Cast ==
- Richard Hearne as Mr. Pastry
- Barbara Hicks as Miss Print
- Cambria Smith as Susan
- Roger May as Michael

== Bibliography ==
- Vahimagi, Tise . British Television: An Illustrated Guide. Oxford University Press, 1996.
