= Dangerous Assignment (film) =

1950 British film by Ben R. Hart

- Directed by: Ben R. Hart
- Written by: Chick Messina
- Produced by: Miriam Crowdy
- Starring: Lionel Murton; Pamela Deeming; Ivan Craig
- Production company: Touchstone Films
- Distributed by: Apex Film Distributors
- Release date: November 1950
- Running time: 58 minutes
- Country: United Kingdom
- Language: English

Dangerous Assignment (also known as London Assignment) is a 1950 British second feature ('B') crime film directed by Ben R. Hart and starring Lionel Murton, Pamela Deeming and Ivan Craig. It was written by Chris Messina and produced by Miriam Crowdy for Touchstone Films.

== Synopsis ==
American crime reporter Joe Wilson visits London in pursuit of "human interest" crime stories. When investigating a stolen car racket, he gets beaten up by a gang, and connected with several murders. Together with his girlfriend Laura he seeks out the whereabouts of a missing car dealer.

== Cast ==
- Lionel Murton as Joe Wilson
- Pamela Deeming as Laura
- Ivan Craig as Frank Mayer
- MacDonald Parke as B.G. Bradley
- Edward Evans as detective
- Michael Hogarth as policeman
- Bill Hodge as the stooge

== Production ==
The film was made with backing from the newly-formed distributor Apex Films.

== Reception ==
While it was criticised for its weak story, it received praise as a "commendable effort" which had achieved a certain amount of realism.

The Monthly Film Bulletin wrote: "Poor, carelessly constructed thriller."

Picturegoer wrote: "A rarity – a British crime second feature that holds one's interest. Barring a shaky start, it is gripping throughout. ... The picture will be found particularly interesting by Londoners as, for economy, much of it was filmed outdoors. Many scenes were shot around Fleet Street. A word about the stars: Lionel Murton does well as the journalist, but I found Pamela Deeming, as the girl detailed by his London office to look after the journalist, somewhat 'wooden' at times. This picture is the first of a series of crime stories Target Films hopes to present from European capitals, with Murton as the roving reporter."

In British Sound Films: The Studio Years 1928–1959 David Quinlan rated the film as "mediocre", writing: "Rough and ready thick-ear, indifferently added."
