= The Girl Who Couldn't Quite =

1950 British film by Norman Lee

- Theatrical release poster
- Directed by: Norman Lee
- Screenplay by: Norman Lee; Marjorie Deans
- Produced by: John Argyll
- Starring: Bill Owen; Elisabeth Henson; Leo Marks
- Cinematography: Geoffrey Faithfull
- Edited by: Lister Laurance
- Music by: Ronald Binge
- Production company: John Argyle Productions
- Distributed by: Monarch Film Corporation
- Release date: 1950
- Running time: 84 minutes
- Country: United Kingdom
- Language: English
- Budget: £50,000

The Girl Who Couldn't Quite is a 1950 British drama film directed by Norman Lee and starring Bill Owen, Elizabeth Henson and Iris Hoey. The screenplay was by Norman Lee and Marjorie Deans based on the 1947 stage play of the same name by Leo Marks.

== Plot ==
Ruth is a teenage girl who has never been able to smile. One day she hears a man singing outside the house and she laughs. Her mother invites the man, a tramp called Tim, into the house in the hope that he will help Ruth. Tim becomes friendly with Ruth and encourages her to talk about her childhood. She reveals that she suffered traumatic experiences as child, which led to her inability to smile. The pain of these memories causes her to fall into a coma. When she wakes, she has no memory of Tim, who now seems frightening to her. Tim leaves the house and returns to the road.

== Cast ==
- Bill Owen as Tim
- Elizabeth Henson as Ruth
- Iris Hoey as Janet
- Betty Stockfeld as Pamela
- Stuart Lindsell as John Pelham
- Vernon Kelso as Paul Evans
- Rose Howlett as Rosa
- Fred Groves as Tony
- Charles Paton as vicar

== Production ==
The title of the play on which the film is based arises from a conversation Leo Marks had with Noor Inayat Khan GC, who had been a British resistance agent in France in World War 2.

The film was shot at Nettlefold Studios, Walton-on-Thames, Surrey.

== Critical reception ==
Kine Weekly said "Elizabeth Henson acts with her heart and her head and makes a highly successful début as the wistful and neurotic Ruth, and Bill Owen draws a real and likeable character as the philosophical Tim, Iris Hoey. Betty Stockfield and Stuart Lindsell also do well in direct support. Their diction is impeccable. The picture ... has a few loose ends and occasionally lapses to time-honoured farce, but even when it is slightly off the beam its central characters retain their hold on the emotions. ... [a] humorous and human story, clever performance by Elizabeth Henson, refreshing atmosphere, compelling feminine angle and provocative title."

Monthly Film Bulletin said "A tear-shaker of the dampest variety, handled with some tact, and simply played by Bill Owen and Elizabeth Henson."

Leslie Halliwell said: "Sentimental bosh from a mildly popular play of its time."

In British Sound Films: The Studio Years 1928–1959 David Quinlan rated the film as "average", writing: "Blend of laughter and tears isn't as unbearable as it might have been."
