= William Comes to Town =

1948 film by Val Guest

- U.S. lobby card
- Directed by: Val Guest
- Written by: Richmal Crompton; Val Guest
- Starring: William Graham; Garry Marsh; Jane Welsh
- Cinematography: Bert Mason
- Edited by: Carmen Beliaeff
- Music by: Robert Farnon
- Distributed by: United Artists Corporation
- Release date: 31 December 1948 (London)
- Running time: 89 minutes
- Language: English

William Comes to Town (also knoiwn as William at the Circus; U.S. title: William Goes to the Circus ) is a 1948 British comedy film directed by Val Guest and starring William Graham and Garry Marsh. It was written by Richmal Crompton and Guest based on the Just William series of novels by Crompton.

== Plot ==
William Brown and his gang the Outlaws visit the Prime Minister in Downing Street to demand shorter school hours and better pay for kids. The newspaper publicity caused by their visit lands William and his friends in trouble with their parents. William almost ruins his chances of going to the circus (his parents made him promise to stay out of trouble), but somehow he finally finds his way there.

== Cast ==
- William Graham as William Brown
- Garry Marsh as Mr. Brown
- Jane Welsh as Mrs. Brown
- Hugh Cross as Robert Brown
- Kathleen Stuart as Ethel Brown
- Muriel Aked as Emily, the maid
- A. E. Matthews as Minister For Economic Affairs
- Brian Weske as Henry
- James Crabbe as Douglas
- Brian Roper as Ginger
- Michael Balfour as stall-holder
- Michael Medwin as reporter
- Jon Pertwee as circus superintendent
- David Page as Hubert Lane (credited as David Paige)
- Norman Pierce as police sergeant
- Eve Mortimer as postmistress
- John Powe as glazier
- Mary Vallange as maid
- Peter Butterworth as postman
- Donald Clive as Ethel's boyfriend
- John Warren as 2nd circus official
- Alan Goford as 1st circus official
- Basil Gordon as 3rd circus official
- Claude Bonsor as 4th circus official
- Ivan Craig as 1st carter
- John Martell as 2nd carter
- Pinkie Hannaford as small boy
- Edward Malin as toy shop man
- Slim Rhyder as tramp cyclist
- Arthur Stanley as oldest inhabitant
- Irene Jones as elephant rider

== Reception ==
The Monthly Film Bulletin wrote: "Slightly far-fetched, this film will be appreciated mainly by juvenile audiences. William Graham is convincing as William, and he is well supported by the remainder of the cast."

Kine Weekly wrote: "Events in the opening reels are somewhat protracted, but the picture provides a wholesome and pleasing domestic atmosphere. The exploitation of an extremely life-like chimpanzee is a bright gag which will not be lost on the legion of William fans, and the several laughable circus turns, elephant and equestrian parades are a fitting climax to a series of schoolboy pranks. The settings of suburban home are modest but adequate, and the photography throughout is very good."

Variety wrote: "Inconsequential story of a schoolboy's adventures which will have seasonal appeal in London, but cannot hope to go beyond the Saturday juve trade in America. ...Story is told in the true William tradition, and some fine shots of the circus provide a pleasing seasonal background. The impish character is again played by William Graham in a manner to please the kids. Garry Marsh and Jane Welsh are his long-suffering parents and a competent east handles the subsidiary characters in a suitable manner."

Val Guest said the film was "very successful."
