= Lionel Murton =

Canadian actor (1915–2006)

- in TV's The Four Just Men (1960)
- Born: William Lionel Murton; 2 June 1915; London, England
- Died: 26 September 2006 (aged 91); Basingstoke, Hampshire, England
- Resting place: Basingstoke Crematorium and Gardens of Remembrance
- Occupation: Actor
- Years active: 1945–1981
- Spouse: Anita D'Allaire

William Lionel Murton (2 June 1915 – 26 September 2006) was an English character actor.

== Biography ==
Born in Wandsworth, London, he was resident at Little Orchard, Weston Road, Upton Grey, Basingstoke, Hampshire, England, before his death at age 91. He was cremated at Basingstoke Crematorium on 6 October 2006. He is commemorated with his wife, Anita, in Upton Grey Churchyard, Grave 1 E-3.

He appeared in episodes of several TV series, including The Persuaders! and Danger Man and was a regular cast member of the Dickie Henderson Show, playing Dickie's friend Jack.

== Selected filmography ==
- Meet the Navy (1946) - Johnny
- Brass Monkey (1948) - Detective Mann
- Badger's Green (1949) - Albert
- The Girl Is Mine (1950)
- Dangerous Assignment (1950) - Joe Wilson
- The Long Dark Hall (1951) - Jefferson (American published) (US version only)
- The Pickwick Papers (1952) - Augustus Snodgrass
- Our Girl Friday (1953) - Barman
- Monte Carlo Baby (1953)
- The Runaway Bus (1954) - American Traveller
- Night People (1954) - Norman Lakeland
- Raising a Riot (1955) - Harry
- The Battle of the River Plate (1956) - Mike Fowler
- Interpol (1957) - Murphy
- Carry On Admiral (1957) - Psychiatrist
- Fire Down Below (1957) - The American
- Up the Creek (1958) - Perkins
- Further Up the Creek (1958) - Perkins
- The Captain's Table (1959) - Bernie Floate
- Make Mine a Million (1959) - Commercial TV director
- The Mouse That Roared (1959) - American General at the Pentagon (uncredited)
- North West Frontier (1959) - American Correspondent
- Our Man in Havana (1959)
- Surprise Package (1960) - US Marshal
- Danger Man (1960-1961) - Colonel Keller
- Petticoat Pirates (1961) - Admiral
- The Main Attraction (1962) - Joe Burton, the Drunk (uncredited)
- On the Beat (1962) - Man in Underground Train
- Summer Holiday (1963) - Jerry
- Man in the Middle (1964) - Capt. Alec Gunther
- Goldfinger (1964) - Colonel (uncredited)
- The Truth About Spring (1964) - Simmons
- Carry On Cowboy (1966) - Clerk
- Doctor in Clover (1966) - Publicity Man
- The Dirty Dozen (1967) - MP Lt. Col. in charge at hanging (uncredited)
- Sette volte sette (1968)
- Nobody Runs Forever (1968) - Reporter on Steps (uncredited)
- The Last Shot You Hear (1969) - Rubens
- Zeta One (1969) - W
- Patton (1970) - Third Army Chaplain James Hugh O'Neill
- The Games (1970) - US Team VIP (uncredited)
- The Revolutionary (1970) - The Professor
- Cannon for Cordoba (1970) - Colonel
- Confessions of a Window Cleaner (1974) - Brenda's Landlord
- Seven Nights in Japan (1976) - American Tourist
- Twilight's Last Gleaming (1977) - Col. Horne
- The Billion Dollar Bubble (1978)
