= MacDonald Parke =

Canadian actor (1891–1960)

- Parke's 1939 Spotlight photo
- Born: 30 July 1891; Cornwall, Ontario, Canada
- Died: 17 July 1960 (aged 68); London, England, United Kingdom
- Occupation: Actor
- Years active: 1938–1960 (film)

MacDonald Parke (1891–1960) was a Canadian film and television actor. He frequently portrayed American characters in British films such as No Orchids for Miss Blandish.

== Filmography ==
Year	Title	Role	Notes
1938	Hey! Hey! USA	Felstead, Lawyer	Uncredited
1939	Shipyard Sally	Diggs	
1941	Hi Gang!	Attorney	
1942	They Flew Alone	Man	
1943	Yellow Canary	Intelligence Chief	Uncredited
1944	Candlelight in Algeria	American	
1946	Teheran	Maj. Wellman, USA	
1948	No Orchids for Miss Blandish	Doc	
1949	The Fool and the Princess	Colonel Wingfield	
1950	Night and the City	American from Chicago	Uncredited
1950	Dangerous Assignment	B.G. Bradley	
1951	A Tale of Five Cities	New York Magazine Editor	
1951	The Six Men	Mc.Graw	
1952	Saturday Island	Ship's Captain	
1952	Penny Princess	Schuyster the Lawyer	Uncredited
1952	Babes in Bagdad	Caliph	
1952	The Man Who Watched Trains Go By	Chicago Businessman	
1953	Is Your Honeymoon Really Necessary?	Admiral Fields	
1953	Three's Company	Evans	(segment "The Scream' story)
1954	The Good Die Young	Mr. Carruthers	Uncredited
1954	The Last Moment	Tom Canting	(segment: 'The Last Moment')
1955	Summertime	Mr. McIlhenny	
1956	The March Hare	Maguire	
1956	Beyond Mombasa	Tourist	
1957	A King in New York		Uncredited
1958	I Was Monty's Double	American General	
1959	John Paul Jones	Arthur Lee	
1959	The Mouse That Roared	General Snippet	
1960	A Touch of Larceny	Jason Parrish	
1960	The Battle of the Sexes	'C.J.'	
1960	Never Take Sweets from a Stranger	Judge	(final film role)

== Bibliography ==
- Michael F. Keaney. British Film Noir Guide. McFarland, 2008.
