= Princess Lilian, Duchess of Halland =

British fashion model and Swedish royal (1915–2013)

Princess Lilian
- Duchess of Halland
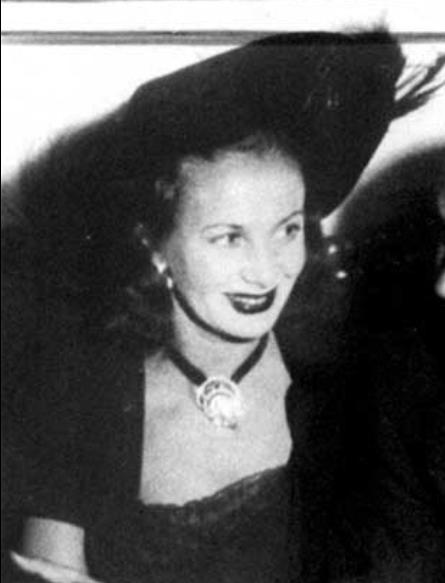
- Lilian in the 1940s
- Born: Lillian May Davies; 30 August 1915; Swansea, United Kingdom
- Died: 10 March 2013 (aged 97); Stockholm, Sweden
- Burial: 16 March 2013; Royal Cemetery, Solna, Sweden
- Spouse: Ivan Craig (m. 1940; div. 1947) Prince Bertil, Duke of Halland (m. 1976; died 1997)
- Father: William John Davies
- Mother: Gladys Mary Curran

Princess Lilian, Duchess of Halland (born Lillian May Davies, later Craig; 30 August 1915 – 10 March 2013), was a British socialite who became a princess of Sweden through her 1976 marriage to Prince Bertil, Duke of Halland (1912–1997). As such, she was an aunt of King Carl XVI Gustaf of Sweden and Queen Margrethe II of Denmark.

== Biography ==
=== Early life ===
Lillian May Davies was born on 30 August 1915, in Swansea, Wales, the daughter of William John Davies, who had a market stall after working in a coal mine, and his wife Gladys Mary (née Curran), a shop assistant. The site of the terraced house where they lived is now beneath the Quadrant Shopping Centre. Her parents separated in the 1920s, but they were not divorced until 1939. She moved to London when she was 16. She dropped one 'l' from her first name when given work as a model, dancer and singer; she also was a hostess at a gambling club.

She was photographed for magazines such as Vogue.

In 1940, Lilian married the Scottish actor Ivan Craig (1912–1995) in Horsham, West Sussex. Shortly after their wedding, Craig joined the British Army and left for Africa, where he saw active service during the Second World War. In his absence, Lilian worked in a factory that made radios for the Royal Navy and at a hospital for wounded soldiers.

=== Marriage to Prince Bertil of Sweden ===
In 1943, she met the Swedish Prince Bertil, Duke of Halland, in London, reportedly at a cocktail party for her 28th birthday. Soon after their meeting, they became lovers although she was still married to Craig. When she and her husband were reunited after the war, Craig expressed his wish to marry another woman, and they were amicably divorced on 7 November 1947.

Bertil's older brother, Prince Gustaf Adolf, Duke of Västerbotten, was second in line to the Swedish throne; but he died in 1947. As Gustaf Adolf's son, Carl Gustaf, was less than one year old, it seemed likely that, when Bertil's grandfather, King Gustaf V, and father (Crown Prince Gustaf Adolf, the future King Gustaf VI Adolf) died, he would have to serve as regent (other heirs having given up their places in the line of succession because of marriages not acceptable to the king). For this reason, Bertil chose not to marry Lilian, so the couple simply lived together discreetly for more than thirty years. In 1946, Prince Bertil acquired a house in Sainte-Maxime, France, that became their private retreat.

Bertil never had to become regent, since his father, who ascended the throne in 1950, lived long enough to see his grandson, Carl Gustaf, come of age. Carl XVI Gustaf ascended the throne in 1973, and, having married a commoner himself, he approved Bertil's and Lilian's marriage, meaning that Bertil would be able to keep his titles and place in the line of succession, and that Lillian would become a princess. They were married on 7 December 1976 at the church of Drottningholm Palace in the presence of the king and the queen.

==== Widowhood ====
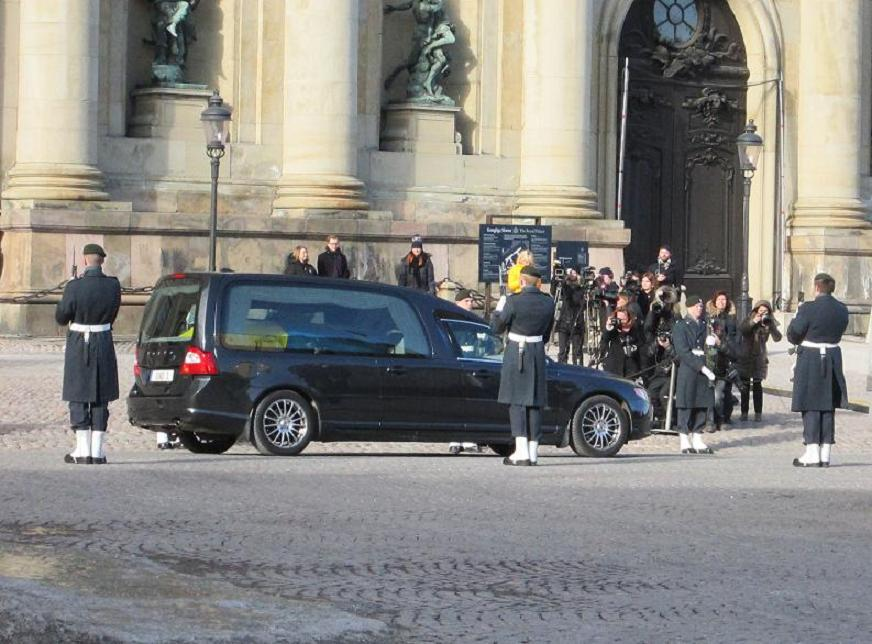
Hearse with Lilian's coffin leaves Stockholm Palace for the Royal Cemetery on 16 March 2013.

Prince Bertil died on 5 January 1997 in their home. From 1997 until 2010, Lilian continued to represent the royal family at various engagements and other occasions. She was the patron of many organizations. In 2000, Lilian released a biography of her life with Bertil.

In August 2008, Lilian fell and broke her femur in her apartment; and, in February 2009, she again suffered a fall in her home. It was announced on 3 June 2010, that Lilian was afflicted with Alzheimer's disease and was no longer able to appear in public. She lived her final years at Villa Solbacken, her longtime home in the Djurgården area of Stockholm, attended by three nurses.

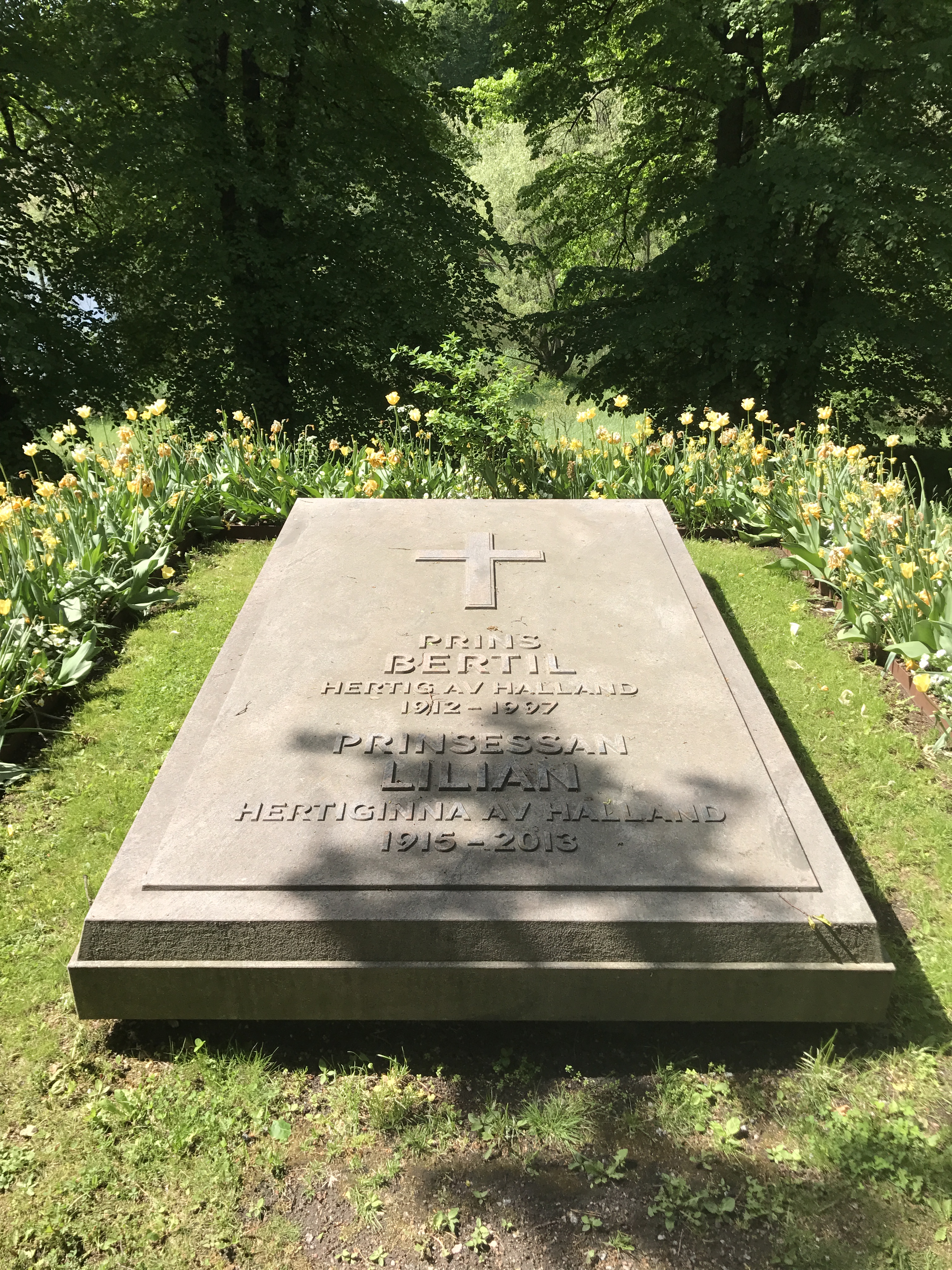
Lilian's and Bertil's grave in Solna

Lilian died in Stockholm on 10 March 2013, aged 97, sixteen years after her husband. The Royal Palace did not give a cause of death, but she had been in poor health for several years. Her death came as the royal family was preparing for Princess Madeleine's wedding, and the family interrupted what they were doing to spend her last moments together with her.

Her 16 March funeral was broadcast live on SVT. It was attended by her nephew and niece-in-law the King and the Queen of Sweden; her nieces the Queen of Denmark, Princess Margaretha, Princess Birgitta, Princess Désirée, and Princess Christina; her grandnieces Crown Princess Victoria and Princess Madeleine; and her grandnephew and grandnephew-in-law Prince Carl Philip and Prince Daniel. Princess Astrid of Norway was also in attendance, as were her friends Roger Moore and his Swedish wife Kiki Tholstrup.

== Titles, honours and arms ==
=== Title ===
- 1976-2013: Her Royal Highness Princess Lilian of Sweden, Duchess of Halland

=== National honours ===
Coat of arms of Princess Lilian.

Royal Monogram of Princess Lilian of Sweden.

- Member and Commander of the Royal Order of the Seraphim
- Commander Grand Cross of the Royal Order of the Polar Star
- Member of the Royal Family Decoration of King Carl XVI Gustaf, 2nd Class
- Recipient of the 50th Birthday Badge Medal of King Carl XVI Gustaf

=== Foreign honours ===
- Argentina: Grand Cross of the Order of the Liberator General San Martín (18 May 1998)
- Austria: Grand Decoration of Honour in Gold with Sash for Services to the Republic of Austria (25 September 1997)
- Denmark: Grand Cross with Diamonds of the Order of the Dannebrog
- Estonia: First Class of the Order of the Cross of Terra Mariana
- France: Grand Cross of the National Order of Merit
- Finland: Commander Grand Cross of the Order of the White Rose of Finland
- Germany: Grand Cross 1st Class of the Order of Merit of the Federal Republic of Germany
- Iceland: Grand Cross of the Order of the Falcon
- Italy: Knight Grand Cross of the Order of Merit of the Italian Republic
- Japan: Paulownia Dame Grand Cordon of the Order of the Precious Crown
- Jordan: Grand Cordon of the Order of the Star of Jordan
- Latvia: Grand Officer of the Order of the Three Stars
- Lithuania: Grand Cross of the Order of Grand Duke Gediminas
- Portugal: Grand Cross of the Order of Christ
- Norway: Grand Cross of the Order of St. Olav
- Spain: Dame Grand Cross of the Order of Isabella the Catholic (15 October 1979)

=== Award ===
- Sweden: Honorary Grand Cross of the Social Order of Innocence

== Patronage ==
- Sweden: Patron of the Social Order of Innocence

== Bibliography ==
- Princess Lilian; Magnergård, Omar; Tarras-Wahlberg, Elisabeth (2000). Mitt liv med prins Bertil [My life with Prince Bertil] (in Swedish). Stockholm: Ekerlid. ISBN 91-88595-77-3. SELIBR 7773482.
