= The Girl Is Mine (film) =

- Directed by: Marjorie Deans
- Written by: Marjorie Deans; Ralph Stock
- Produced by: Freda Stock
- Starring: Patrick Macnee; Pamela Deeming; Lionel Murton
- Cinematography: Ben R. Hart
- Music by: Burt Rhodes
- Production company: Touchstone Films
- Distributed by: British Lion Films
- Release date: April 1950
- Running time: 51 minutes
- Country: United Kingdom
- Language: English

The Girl Is Mine (also known as This Girl is Mine) is a 1950 British second feature ('B') comedy drama film directed by Marjorie Deans and starring Patrick Macnee, Pamela Deeming and Lionel Murton. It was written by Deans and Ralph Stock, produced by Freda Stock for Touchstone Films and distributed by British Lion Films.

== Plot ==
Hard-up Hugh Hurcombe owns the Winkle, a small boat moored on the Thames, and owes money to crooked local boat repairer Pringle. He falls in love with Betty Marriott and wants to marry her, but cannot afford a marriage licence. He meets American soldier James Rutt who lends him the money to pay Pringle extortionate costs. By now James and Betty have fallen in love, but all Hugh truly cares about is his boat.

== Cast ==
- Patrick Macnee as Hugh Hurcombe
- Pamela Deeming as Betty Marriott
- Lionel Murton as James Rutt
- Arthur Melton as Pringle
- Richard Pearson as Sergeant
- Ben Williams as policeman
- Leonard Sharp as watchman

== Reception ==
The Monthly Film Bulletin wrote: "Amateurish little film about a friendly American who helps an English couple to rescue their boat from a crooked boat builder. Some pleasant Thames-side scenery, shot on location, but the film is poorly constructed, and the inadequacy of the production shows principally in very badly synchronised dialogue."

Kine Weekly wrote: "Wishy-Washy Thames-side romantic comedy. Its story, which hinges on the friendship of a Gi and the impoverished owner of a small river craft, clumsily illustrates the saying, 'Never introduce your donah to a pal.' It is amateurish in every department. Ticklish booking. ... Lionel Murton is not too bad as James, but Patrick Macnee and Pamela Deeming, who unwisely attempts to sing, are way off the beam as Hugh and Betty. We'll spare the rest. The picture covers quite a section of theThames, but its characters dodge about so much that it is almost impossible to follow the story. It is untidy, feebly dialogued, poorly directed and carelessly edited."

In British Sound Films: The Studio Years 1928–1959 David Quinlan rated the film as "mediocre", writing: "Unambitious trifle, a rare example for the time of a film directed by a woman."
