= Come Dance with Me (1950 film) =

1950 British film by Mario Zampi

- British trade ad
- Directed by: Mario Zampi
- Written by: Cyril Roberts
- Produced by: Mario Zampi; Mae Murray (Associate producer)
- Starring: Anne Shelton; Max Wall; Derek Roy; Anton Karas
- Cinematography: James Wilson
- Edited by: Giulio Zampi
- Music by: Stanley Black
- Production company: Mario Zampi Productions (as Anglofilm)
- Distributed by: Columbia Pictures Corporation (UK)
- Release date: June 1950 (UK)
- Running time: 58 min.
- Country: UK
- Language: English

Come Dance with Me is a 1950 British musical film directed by Mario Zampi and starring Max Wall, Gordon Humphris and Yvonne Marsh. It was written by Cyril Roberts, and made by Zampi's Anglofilm. The film largely comprises a series of cabaret acts.

== Synopsis ==
A valet and a lady's maid, both masquerading as high society figures – a Baronet and "the Honourable Francesca" – meet at a London night club. After spending the evening watching the various cabaret acts, they are invited to join the performance as dancers.

== Cast ==
- Max Wall as manager
- Gordon Humphris as Joe Smith, the boy
- Yvonne Marsh as the girl
- Barbara Hamilton as Kiki, stage girl
- Vincent Ball as nightclub secretary
- Anton Karas as himself
- Anne Shelton as herself
- Derek Roy as himself
- Stanley Black and his orchestra
- The Marquis Trio as themselves
- Aida Foster's Girls (rhumba dancers)
- Arthur Lane

== Reception ==
The Monthly Film Bulletin wrote: "Very thin plot is used as a peg on which to hang a number of cabaret acts these are not particularly entertaining in themselves, and no attempt has been made to present the material in a way suited to the cinema."

Kine Weekly wrote: "Pocket screen cabaret, set in a London night club. Its stars are well known, but with few exceptions they should be heard and not seen. Miles behind the times from a story viewpoint ... The main purpose of the artless story is to introduce a small string of popular radio and music-hall turns, but even that responsibilily is too much for it ... To make matters worse, the camera work is, if possible, less imaginative than the tale."

Picturegoer wrote: "Gooey cabaret set in a London night club. An artless story affords the excuse to introduce some popular radio and music hall turns. ... None of them succeeds in really hitting the jackpot. Photography is none too imaginative, either. Gordon Humphries and Yvonne Marsh in the leading roles dance well together, but are beaten by the script when it comes to acting."

Picture Show wrote: "The slender story of this film is merely a thread on which to hang the various variety turns which comprise the main entertainment."
