= Small Town Story (film) =

1953 film by Montgomery Tully

- Original press ad
- Directed by: Montgomery Tully
- Written by: Franz Marischka; Maurice Weissberger
- Produced by: Otto Kreisler
- Starring: Donald Houston; Susan Shaw; Alan Wheatley; Kent Walton
- Cinematography: Jo Jago
- Edited by: George Fisher
- Music by: Eric Spear
- Production company: Almanack Film Productions Ltd
- Distributed by: General Film Distributors
- Release date: 21 December 1953
- Running time: 69 minutes
- Country: United Kingdom
- Language: English

Small Town Story is a 1953 British thriller, directed by Montgomery Tully and starring Donald Houston and Susan Shaw. It was written by Franz Marischka and Maurice Weissberger.

The film is set in the world of association football and features appearances from sporting legend Denis Compton and commentator Raymond Glendenning, as well as players from the Arsenal, Millwall and Hayes football teams. It features the only screen acting credit of Kent Walton, who later become a famous sports commentator.

== Preservation status ==
The film soon disappeared from cinemas and its fate was unknown for several decades. The British Film Institute included it on its "75 Most Wanted" list of missing British feature films. It was subsequently found, restored and released on DVD in 2015.

== Plot ==
Canadian ex-serviceman Bob Regan returns to Oldchester, the English town where he was stationed during the war, hoping to find Pat Lane, the girl he fell in love with. He meets up with Mike Collins, an old acquaintance who now manages Oldchester United, the local football club. He also renews his friendship with Collins' daughter Jackie.

Mike tells Bob of an odd proviso surrounding the allocation of £25,000 from the estate of a recently deceased businessman and supporter of the football club – if Oldchester United win promotion to the next division of the Football League that season the money is theirs, if not it goes to the man's nephew. He remembers Bob as a skilful footballer, and asks him to sign up for the team to boost the promotion quest. Bob agrees.

The nephew Nick Hammond is determined that the money will be his, and is worried that Bob's football prowess may well propel the team to on-pitch success. He is acquainted with Pat, now living in London, and persuades her to join him in a scheme to scupper Oldchester's chances. Knowing of Bob's fondness for Pat, and that Pat cares nothing for Bob, he proposes that if Pat can tempt Bob away from Oldchester and the football team, and the team fails in its promotion bid, he will give her a share of the inheritance. The mercenary Pat jumps at the prospect, begins to work her charms on Bob and soon lures him to London to be with her. He is talent-spotted by scouts, and signed up by Arsenal F.C.

In due course Bob becomes aware of Pat's true colours, seeks his release from Arsenal and returns to Oldchester, where reformed jail-bird Tony Warren becomes his unofficial bodyguard. The end of the football season approaches with Oldchester needing to win their final home match to gain promotion. The game starts well, with Bob's goal giving the team a half-time lead. However Nick, in a last attempt to derail Oldchester's chances, succeeds in kidnapping Bob at the half-time interval. Following a car chase involving Tony and Jackie, the tables are turned and Bob is freed. He gets back to the football ground during the closing stages of the match, to find Oldchester trailing by one goal. Returning to the pitch, he scores two late goals to seal Oldchester's victory, promotion and financial windfall. As a bonus, he realises his attraction to Jackie and the couple embrace.

== Cast ==
- Donald Houston as Tony Warren
- Susan Shaw as Pat Lane
- Alan Wheatley as Nick Hammond
- Kent Walton as Bob Regan
- George Merritt as Mike Collins
- Margaret Harrison as Jackie Collins
- Norman Williams as Elton
- Arthur Rigby as Alf Benson
- Michael Balfour as Turner
- Richard Wattis as Marsh
- Molly Weir as maid
- Billy Milne as trainer
- Denis Compton as himself
- Raymond Glendenning as himself

== Reception ==
The Monthly Film Bulletin wrote: "The film may find sympathy among incorrigible football fans (the matches are neatly staged and efficiently photographed) but the inadequacy of both script and direction severely limits its appeal".

Kine Weekly described it as "So-so quota support. The acting is very second eleven...it's definitely off-side".

The Daily Film Renter wrote: "Screenwriters Franz Marischka and Maurice Weissberger recount everyone's favourite British football romance how the brilliant player is almost seduced from his club, is even held prisoner at revolver point by the villain, but manages to escape and reach the ground in time to score the goal which saves the day. Kent Walton plays the footballing hero with ease, principally because his football prowess is first-rate, thereby effectively glossing over utilitarian dialogue and situations."

== See also ==
- List of rediscovered films
