= A Killer Walks =

- Directed by: Ronald Drake
- Written by: Ronald Drake
- Based on: novel Envy My Simplicity by Rayner Barton play Gathering Storm by Gordon Glennon
- Produced by: John Ainsworth; Ronald Drake
- Starring: Laurence Harvey; Trader Faulkner; Susan Shaw; Laurence Naismith
- Cinematography: Jack Asher; Phil Grindrod
- Edited by: John Dunsford
- Music by: Eric Spear
- Production company: Leontine Entertainments
- Release date: October 1952 (UK)
- Running time: 57 minutes
- Country: United Kingdom
- Language: English

A Killer Walks is a 1952 British film noir directed and written by Ronald Drake and starring Laurence Harvey, Trader Faulkner and Susan Shaw.

== Plot ==
Two brothers, Ned and Frankie, live on a farm with their elderly grandmother. Ned despises being a farm labourer and falls in love with a girl from the city. She does not like farm life either and dreams of having her own hair salon.

Frankie is a somnambulist and one night he kills a bull with his gun. He also has many knives. This gives Ned an idea: what if he stabs his grandmother and blames Frankie for the murder? Then he will inherit the farm and buy a hair salon for his beloved.

== Cast ==
- Susan Shaw as Joan Gray
- Laurence Harvey as Ned Harsten
- Trader Faulkner as Frankie Harsten
- Laurence Naismith as Doctor James
- Sheila Shand Gibbs as Brenda
- Ethel Edwards as Gran Elizabeth
- Valentine Dunn as Brenda's mother
- Madge Brindley as Mrs. Ramble
- John Ainsworth as Tony

== Reception ==
The Monthly Film Bulletin wrote: "An ineptly made, strenuously over-acted, melodrama of violent goings-on in the Cold Comfort Farm territory."

Kine Weekly wrote: "Turgid tabloid crime melodrama, with drab farm background. ...The picture, cut-price Grand Guignol, is incredibly unsubtle, and the longer it goes on the more miserable and apparent it becomes."

Picture Show wrote: "Murder drama which at times becomes somewhat luridly melodramatic."
