= Devil's Point (film) =

1954 British film by Montgomery Tully

- US theatrical release poster
- Directed by: Montgomery Tully
- Written by: Charles Deane
- Produced by: Charles Deane
- Starring: Richard Arlen; Greta Gynt; Donald Houston; Mary Germaine
- Cinematography: Geoffrey Faithfull
- Edited by: Enid Mansell; Peter Seabourne
- Production company: Charles Deane Productions
- Distributed by: Monarch Film Corporation; 20th Century Fox (US)
- Release date: 20 September 1954
- Running time: 70 minutes
- Country: United Kingdom
- Language: English

Devil's Point (U.S. title: Devil's Harbor) is a 1954 British drama film directed by Montgomery Tully and starring Richard Arlen, Greta Gynt and Donald Houston. It was written and produced by Charles Deane as a second feature, one of two he made starring Hollywood actor Arlen; the other was Stolen Time (1955). The film was released in the United States by 20th Century Fox.

== Plot ==
John 'Captain' Martin is a sailor who gets involved with a drug ring when he finds a package on a harbour containing their stolen goods. He meets with a detective and rounds up the hoodlums.

== Cast ==
- Richard Arlen as John 'Captain' Martin
- Greta Gynt as Peggy Mason
- Donald Houston as Michael Mallard
- Mary Germaine as Margaret Lane
- Edwin Richfield as Daller
- Michael Balfour as Bennett
- John Dunbar as Sam
- Vincent Ball as Williams
- Arnold Adrian as Mark
- Doreen Holliday as Susie Woods
- Victor Baring as Enson
- Sydney Bromley as Enson
- Elspet Gray as June Mallard
- Antony Viccars as Detective Inspector Hunt
- Peter Bernard as Sam, pawnbroker
- Stuart Saunders as Ryan
- Howard Lang as Marne

== Reception ==
The Monthly Film Bulletin wrote: "A commonplace mystery story, with a confused plot, a certain elementary suspense and some artificially contrived excitements."

Kine Weekly wrote: "The picture occasionally gets caught up in its own cross-currents, but choppy moments are few and it puts plenty of punch into its concluding episodes and climax. Richard Arlen is virile and likeable as Martin, Donald Houston registers as the resolute Mallard and Greta Gynt makes a comely Peggy. The supporting players also keep on their toes."

Variety wrote: "The melodramatics in this British-made thriller that 20th-Fox is distributing come off poorly and it is best suited for fill-in bookings in the lesser situations. Only familiar name is that of Richard Arlen, balance of cast being Britishers. ... The basic plot idea furnished a good enough springboard for a program meller, but it falls apart in the script development, giving the players little to work with. Montgomery Tully's direction is no help, either, so there's no plausibility to the action. The technical contributions are substandard."

In British Sound Films: The Studio Years 1928–1959 David Quinlan rated the film as "mediocre", writing: "Very artificial thriler of little interest."
