= Murder at 3am =

1953 film by Francis Searle

- Original Australian poster
- Directed by: Francis Searle
- Written by: John Ainsworth; Moie Charles (additional dialogue)
- Story by: John Ainsworth
- Produced by: John Ainsworth; David Henley
- Starring: Dennis Price; Peggy Evans; Rex Garner
- Cinematography: S.D. Onions
- Edited by: Adam Dawson
- Music by: Eric Spear
- Production companies: David Henley Productions; Renown Pictures Corporation
- Release date: July 1953 (UK)
- Running time: 60 minutes
- Country: United Kingdom
- Language: English

Murder at 3 a.m. is a 1953 British second feature crime film directed by Francis Searle and starring Dennis Price, Peggy Evans and Rex Garner. It was written by John Ainsworth. A Scotland Yard detective investigates a series of attacks on women.

== Plot ==
There have been a series of attacks on women walking home in the early hours, and now a woman has been found murdered. Chief Inspector Peter Lawton investigates. His suspicion falls on Edward King, an ex-commando who is engaged to Lawton's sister Joan. He uses Joan to trap King, but King flees. It transpires that King is innocent; the killer is his half-brother Jim.

== Cast ==
- Dennis Price as Chief Inspector Peter Lawton
- Peggy Evans as Joan Lawton
- Rex Garner as Detective Sergeant Todd
- Arnold Bell as Assistant Commissioner McMann
- Greta Mayaro as Lena
- Philip Saville as Edward 'Teddy' King/Jim King
- Leonard Sharp as Old Skip
- Nora Gordon as Nanna
- Renee Goddard as Lady Branstead
- Arthur Lovegrove as Inspector Cobb
- Daphne Maddox as victim
- Robert Weeden as CID constable
- John Davis as transmitting constable (uncredited)

== Critical reception ==
Kine Weekly said "The exuberant, if somewhat lurid and extravagent, yarn unfolds against bright night-club and realistic nocturnal London street scenes which cunningly create an illusion of scope. For its size it carries quite a kick."

Monthly Film Bulletin wrote: "A second-rate thriller, unimaginatively directed; the cast attempts to make something out of the too-familiar dialogue and situations."

In British Sound Films: The Studio Years 1928–1959 David Quinlan rated the film as "mediocre", writing: "Shabby 'B' feature, tiresomely made"

To-Day's Cinema called it an "efficient specimen" of the crime thriller.
