= The Diplomatic Corpse =

The Diplomatic Corpse may refer to:

- The Diplomatic Corpse (film), a 1958 British second feature comedy thriller film
- The Diplomatic Corpse (Alfred Hitchcock Presents), a 1957 episode of the American TV series Alfred Hitchcock Presents

== See also ==
- Diplomatic corps
