= Wolf Rilla =

German-British film director and screenwriter (1920–2005)

- Born: Wolfgang Peter Rilla; March 16, 1920; Berlin, Germany
- Died: 19 October 2005 (aged 85); Grasse, Provence-Alpes-Côte d'Azur, France
- Other name: W. P. Rilla
- Education: St Catharine's College, Cambridge
- Occupations: Director; screenwriter
- Father: Walter Rilla

Wolf Peter Rilla (16 March 1920 – 19 October 2005), known as Wolf Rilla, was a German-British film and television director, and screenwriter.

== Early life and education ==
Rilla was born in the Charlottenburg borough of Berlin. He was the son of actor Walter Rilla and his wife Theresia Klausner. His parents were both Jewish.

Rilla's family recognised the dangers when Hitler came to power, and moved to London in 1934 when Wolf was 14. He completed his schooling at the progressive co-educational Frensham Heights School, Surrey, and went on to St Catharine's College, Cambridge. In 1942, he joined the BBC External Service's German section, beginning as a script editor, but transferred to television in the late 1940s.

== Film and television career ==
Rilla left the BBC staff in 1952 to pursue a career making films, but continued to take on television productions as a freelance. For television, he directed episodes of series such as The Adventures of the Scarlet Pimpernel (1955-1956) and The Adventures of Aggie (1957), both produced for ITV, but also aimed at the American market. Later, he wrote episodes of the Paul Temple television series.

Meanwhile, in the cinema he worked for Group 3 Films, a production company set up by the National Film Finance Corporation with Michael Balcon, John Baxter and John Grierson in charge. The intention was to give young talent a chance to make modestly budgeted films (those costing less than £50,000), but the arrangement only survived until 1956. By 1960, Rilla was working regularly for MGM-British Studios.

His best remembered film, Village of the Damned (1960), dates from his period with the American studio's British subsidiary. Derived from John Wyndham's sci-fi novel The Midwich Cuckoos. As well as directing the film, Rilla collaborated with producer Ronald Kinnoch (using the pseudonym George Barclay) and Stirling Silliphant on the adaptation. George Sanders co-starred with Barbara Shelley. In his other film for MGM-British, Rilla directed his father, along with Sanders, Richard Johnson, and Egyptian star Faten Hamama (in her only English-language role) in Cairo (1963), a remake of John Huston's The Asphalt Jungle, with Tutankhamun's jewels in the Egyptian Museum as the robber’s target.

He directed his only film in his native Germany, Die zornigen jungen Männer, in 1960.

Rilla also wrote an episode of Doomwatch entitled The Devil's Demolition, however the programme was cancelled before it was produced.

== Other works ==
His novels included Greek Chorus, The Dispensable Man, The Chinese Consortium and one simply entitled Movie. He wrote many books for students, such as The Writer and the Screen: On Writing for Film and Television and The A to Z of Movie Making.

== Personal life ==
Rilla married the actress and director Valerie Hanson after they appeared together in a BBC television production of The Portugal Lady; the couple had a daughter, Madeleine, in 1955. In 1967, he married Shirley Graham-Ellis, a publicist for tea suppliers Jacksons of Piccadilly and London Films. Rilla and Graham-Ellis had a son, Nico, who has been a filmmaker and chef. His daughter Madeline died in a car crash in 1985.

After Rilla had held office in both the film technicians' union ACTT and the Directors Guild of Great Britain, he and Shirley moved to the south of France, to buy and run a hotel at Fayence in Provence.

=== Death ===
Rilla died in France in 2005.

== Filmography ==
- Noose for a Lady (1953)
- Glad Tidings (1953)
- The Large Rope (1953)
- Marilyn (US: Roadhouse Girl, 1953)
- The Black Rider (1954)
- The End of the Road (1954)
- Stock Car (1955)
- The Blue Peter (1955)
- Pacific Destiny (1956)
- The Scamp (1957)
- Bachelor of Hearts (1958)
- Jessy (1959)
- Witness in the Dark (1959)
- Die zornigen jungen Männer (1960)
- Village of the Damned (1960)
- Piccadilly Third Stop (1960)
- Watch it, Sailor! (1961)
- The World Ten Times Over (1963)
- Cairo (1963)
- Pax? (1968)
- Secrets of a Door-to-Door Salesman (1973)
- Bedtime with Rosie (1974)
