= The Raven (1963 film) =

1963 B movie horror-comedy directed by Roger Corman

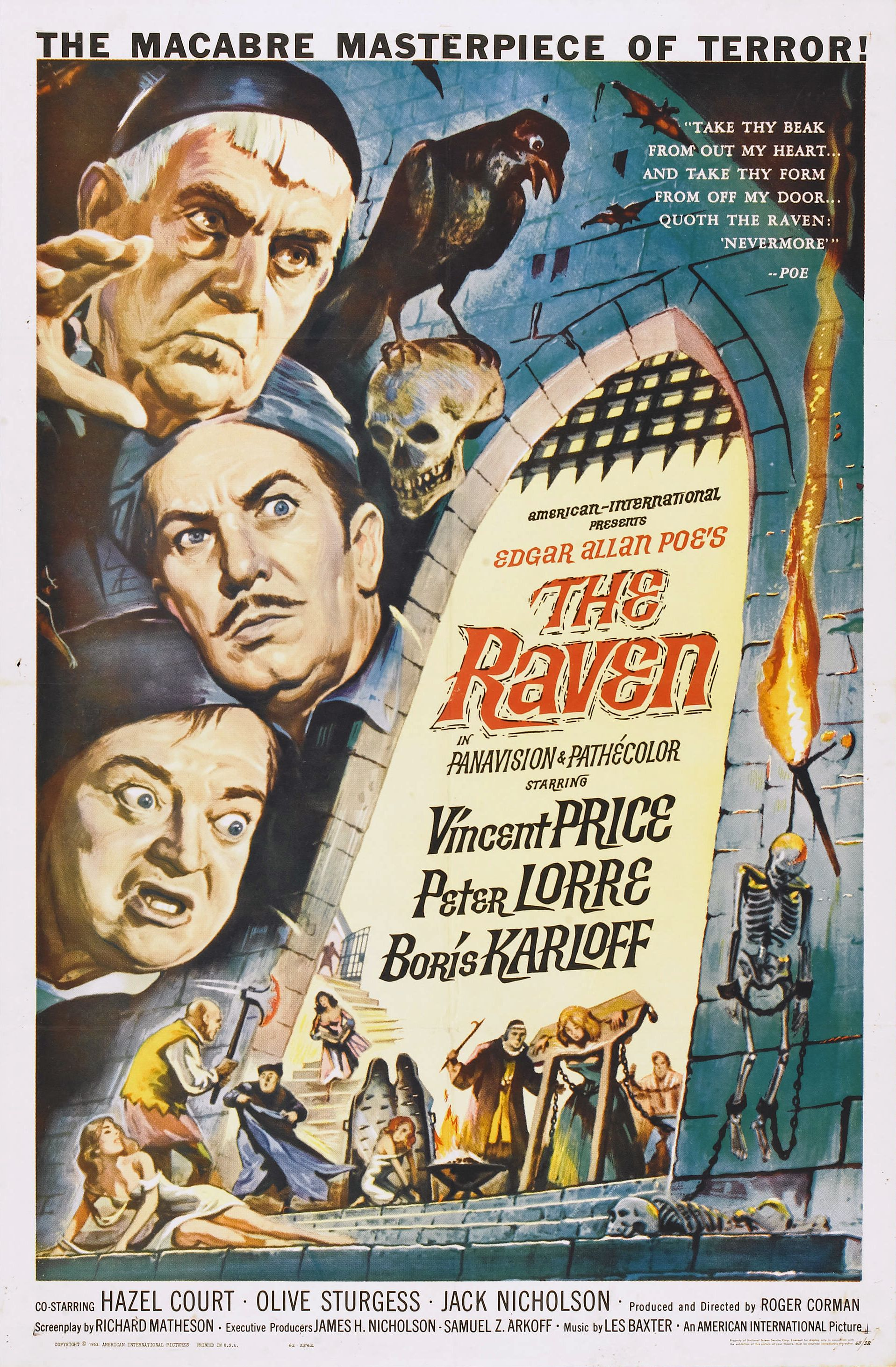
- Theatrical release poster by Reynold Brown
- Directed by: Roger Corman
- Screenplay by: Richard Matheson
- Based on: "The Raven" by Edgar Allan Poe
- Produced by: Roger Corman
- Starring: Vincent Price; Peter Lorre; Boris Karloff; Hazel Court; Olive Sturgess; Jack Nicholson
- Cinematography: Floyd Crosby
- Edited by: Ronald Sinclair
- Music by: Les Baxter
- Color process: Pathécolor
- Production company: Alta Vista Productions
- Distributed by: American International Pictures
- Release date: January 23, 1963
- Running time: 86 minutes
- Country: United States
- Language: English
- Budget: $350,000
- Box office: $1,499,275

The Raven is a 1963 American comedy Gothic horror film produced and directed by Roger Corman. The film stars Vincent Price, Peter Lorre, and Boris Karloff as a trio of rival sorcerers. The supporting cast includes Jack Nicholson as the son of Lorre's character.

It was the fifth in the so-called Corman-Poe cycle of eight films largely featuring adaptations of Edgar Allan Poe stories produced by Roger Corman and released by American International Pictures (AIP). The film was written by Richard Matheson, based on references to Poe's 1845 poem "The Raven". AIP released the film as a double feature with Night Tide.

Three decades earlier, Karloff had appeared in another film with the same title, Lew Landers's 1935 horror film The Raven with Bela Lugosi.

== Plot ==
In the year 1506, the sorcerer Dr. Erasmus Craven has been mourning the death of his wife Lenore for over two years, much to the dismay of Lenore's stepdaughter Estelle. One night he is visited by a raven, the wizard Dr. Bedlo. Together they brew a potion that restores Bedlo to human form.

Bedlo explains that he was transformed by Dr. Scarabus in an unfair duel. Both decide to see Scarabus, Bedlo to exact revenge and Craven to look for his wife, whom Bedlo saw alive at Scarabus's castle. After fighting off an attack by Craven's coachman, who acted under the influence of Scarabus, they are joined by Estelle and by Bedlo's son Rexford, and set out to the castle. Estelle and Rexford become fond of each other over the journey.

At the castle, Scarabus greets his guests with false friendship, and Bedlo is apparently killed as he conjures a storm in an act of defiance. At night, however, Rexford finds Bedlo alive and well, hiding in the castle. Bedlo conspired with Scarabus to deliver Craven to him, so that Scarabus could acquire his magical secrets. Craven, meanwhile, is visited and tormented by Lenore, who is revealed to have faked her death to become Scarabus's mistress.

As Craven, Estelle, Rexford and Bedlo try to escape from the castle, Scarabus stops them, and they are imprisoned. Bedlo panics and begs Scarabus to turn him back into a raven rather than torture him. He then flees the dungeon by flying away. Craven is forced to choose between surrendering his magical secrets to Scarabus or watching his daughter be tortured. Having only pretended to desert his friends and son, Bedlo secretly returns and frees Rexford, and together they aid Craven.

Craven and Scarabus engage in a magic duel. After a series of attacks, counterattacks and insults, during which Scarabus sets the castle on fire, Craven defeats Scarabus. Lenore tries to reconcile with him, claiming that she was bewitched by Scarabus, but Craven disbelieves and rejects her. Craven, Bedlo, Estelle and Rexford escape as the castle collapses on Scarabus and Lenore; both survive, but Scarabus's magic is gone.

Bedlo, still a raven, tries to convince Craven to restore him to human form. Still bitter over Bedlo's earlier betrayal, Craven casts a spell to render him mute. He then looks directly into the camera and, quoting Poe directly, says, "Quoth the Raven: 'Nevermore!' "

== Cast ==
- Vincent Price as Dr. Erasmus Craven
- Peter Lorre as Dr. Adolphus Bedlo
- Boris Karloff as Dr. Scarabus
- Hazel Court as Lenore Craven
- Olive Sturgess as Estelle Craven
- Jack Nicholson as Rexford Bedlo
- Connie Wallace as Maid
- William Baskin as Grimes
- Aaron Saxon as Gort

== Production ==
=== Script ===
Roger Corman and Richard Matheson had both enjoyed making the comic "The Black Cat" episode of Tales of Terror and wanted to try an entirely comic Poe feature.

"After I heard they wanted to make a movie out of a poem, I felt that was an utter joke, so comedy was really the only way to go with it", said Matheson.

=== Shooting ===
The film was shot in 15 days.

Roger Corman said that although they kept closely to the structure and story script, "We did more improvisation on that film than any of the others." During shooting, Peter Lorre ad-libbed a number of lines in the film including:

- "How the hell should I know?", after Vincent Price asks "shall I ever see the rare and radiant Lenore again?"
- "Where else?" after Vincent Price says "I keep her here." (referring to the body of his lost love Lenore, kept in a coffin in the hall)
- "Hard place to keep clean."

Roger Corman said that Lorre's improvisations confused both Vincent Price and Boris Karloff, but Price adapted to it well while Karloff struggled:

Overall I would say we had as good a spirit on The Raven as any film I've ever worked on, except for a couple of moments with Boris. There was a slight edge to it, because Boris came in with a carefully worked out preparation, so when Peter started improvising lines, it really threw Boris off from his preparation.

Corman said the tension between Peter Lorre and Jack Nicholson as father and son came from the actors rather than the script, as the two did not get along well.

Vincent Price later recalled about the final duel:

Boris hated being strung up in the air on those chairs. He was terribly crippled, and we were both floating in the air on these wires. It wasn't a pleasant feeling! And I hated having that snake wrapped around my neck for two hours... I hate snakes.

Boris Karloff later said he was annoyed at having to wear the heavy cape.

The footage of the burning interior of the castle was reused from Corman's 1960 film House of Usher.

== Release ==
The Raven opened on January 23, 1963 in 100 theaters in the Greater New York area before opening the following week in 50 theaters in Southern California.

=== Critical reception ===
The Raven received varying reviews from contemporary critics. Variety wrote that while Poe "might turn over in his crypt at this nonsensical adaptation of his immortal poem", Corman nevertheless "takes this premise and develops it expertly as a horror-comedy." The Chicago Tribune called it "fairly thin fare, made up mostly of camera tricks, and some very obviously false scenery, but Peter Lorre's performance is mildly entertaining. Youngsters may find it fun." A generally positive review in The Monthly Film Bulletin wrote that the film "starts off with the inestimable advantage of a script which not only makes it amply clear from the outset that [Corman] is cheerfully and wholeheartedly sending himself up, but manages to do it wittily." Its main criticism was a "long central section" of the film that drags until things pick up again for the final duel. Peter John Dyer of Sight & Sound wrote, "Richard Matheson's script, a good deal more tenuous than its predecessors in the Corman-Poe canon, at least treats its actors generously to props, incantations and quotable lines ... A pity the equation doesn't always add up; there's too much slack, due perhaps to an imbalance between the comedy, which runs riot, and the horror, which trails behind in the wake of previous Corman films." Bosley Crowther of The New York Times panned the film as "comic-book nonsense ... Strickly [sic] a picture for the kiddies and the bird-brained, quote the critic."

The movie has received a more positive reception from modern reviewers. On Rotten Tomatoes, the film has an approval rating of 88% based on reviews from 17 critics, with an average rating of 6.8 out of 10.

=== Box office ===
The film was popular at the box office.

=== Novelization ===
A novelization of the film was written by Eunice Sudak adapted from Richard Matheson's screenplay and published by Lancer Books in paperback. This novel was republished by Bear Manor Media in 2012.

== Comic book adaptation ==
- Dell Movie Classic: The Raven (September 1963)
