= Donald Houston =

Welsh actor (1923–1991)

- Born: 6 November 1923; Clydach Vale, Wales
- Died: 13 October 1991 (aged 67); Coimbra, Portugal
- Occupation: Actor
- Years active: 1949–1984
- Spouse: Brenda Hogan (m. 1949)
- Family: Glyn Houston (brother)

Donald Daniel Houston (6 November 1923 – 13 October 1991) was a Welsh actor whose first two films—The Blue Lagoon (1949) with Jean Simmons, and A Run for Your Money (1949) with Alec Guinness—were highly successful. Later in his career he was cast in military roles and in comedies such as the Doctor and Carry On series.

== Early life ==
Houston was born in Clydach Vale, near Tonypandy, Wales and was the elder brother of actor Glyn Houston and a sister, Jean.

His father Alexander Houston, was a professional football player from Scotland, and his mother Elsie M Jones, ran a milk round. Following the death of their mother at age 29, Donald and brother Glyn Houston were raised by their grandmother while their father scoured the United Kingdom in order to find work.

After leaving school he worked at a local colliery before deciding to start an acting career. In 1940 he performed on stage with the Pilgrim Players. He served in the Royal Air Force during the Second World War as a rear gunner and radio officer.

== Acting career ==
Houston had a successful career as a character actor in film and television, with prominent parts in several well-known films, including Yangtse Incident (1957), The Longest Day (1962, in which he appeared alongside Richard Burton), 633 Squadron (1964), Where Eagles Dare (1968, again with Burton) and The Sea Wolves (1981). He would sometimes indulge his Welsh accent, and at other times conceal it behind a Received Pronunciation voice. His forte tended to be authority figures, often military, such as the brilliant but tough David Caulder, the head of Moonbase 3, or Dr Francis in "Thirteen to Centaurus" (from the anthology series Out of the Unknown).

He could also handle comedy, as he proved with Doctor in the House (1954) and the later Doctor in Distress (1963), both significant successes in Europe, and Carry On Jack (1963). Though preferring quality parts, he was not above journeyman work in films such as Maniac (1963) and Tales That Witness Madness (1973).

== Death ==
He died on 13 October 1991, of a stroke in Coimbra, Portugal.

The house in which he was born in Tonypandy, Rhondda is marked with a Blue Plaque historical marker. The unveiling ceremony was attended by Donald's daughter Sian, his granddaughter Michela, his sister Jean Rees and other family members and friends. Historian Peter Stead spoke about Donald Houston's film career at the plaque unveiling ceremony.

== Selected filmography ==
- The Blue Lagoon (1949) as Michael Reynolds
- A Run for Your Money (1949) as Dai
- Dance Hall (1950) as Phil
- Crow Hollow (1952) as Dr. Robert Amour
- My Death Is a Mockery (1952)
- The Red Beret (1953) as Taffy
- The Large Rope (1953) as Tom Penney
- Small Town Story (1953) as Tony Warren
- Doctor in the House (1954) as Taffy Evans
- The Happiness of Three Women (1954) as John
- Devil's Point (1954) as Michael Mallard
- The Flaw (1955) as John Millway
- Doublecross (1956) as Albert Pascoe
- Find the Lady (1956) as Bill
- The Girl in the Picture (1957) as Jon Deering
- Yangtse Incident (1957) as Lt Weston RN
- The Surgeon's Knife (1957) as Dr. Alex Waring
- A Question of Adultery (1958) as Mr. Jacobus
- The Man Upstairs (1958) as Dr. Sanderson
- Room at the Top (1959) as Charles Soames
- Danger Within (1959) as Capt. Roger Byfold
- The Mark (1961) as Austin
- Twice Round the Daffodils (1962) as John Rhodes
- The 300 Spartans (1962) as Hydarnes
- The Longest Day (1962) as RAF Pilot
- Maniac (1963) as Henri
- Doctor in Distress (1963) as Maj. Tommy Ffrench
- Carry On Jack (1963) as First Officer Jonathan Howett
- 633 Squadron (1964) as Group Capt. Don Barrett
- Danger Man Episode: 'The Mirror's New' (TV series 1965) - Edward Bierce
- A Study in Terror (1965) as Doctor Watson
- Gideon's Way Episode: 'Fall High, Fall Hard' (TV series 1965) - Tony Erickson (his actor brother Glyn Houston also appeared in the episode)
- Out of the Unknown Episode: 'Thirteen to Centaurus' (TV series 1965) - Dr. Francis
- The Viking Queen (1967) as Maelgan
- Where Eagles Dare (1968) as Capt. Olaf Christiansen
- The Bushbaby (1969) as John Leeds
- My Lover My Son (1970) as Robert
- Now Take My Wife (1971) as Harry Love
- Tales That Witness Madness (1973) as Sam Patterson (segment 1 "Mr. Tiger")
- Voyage of the Damned (1976) as Dr. Glauner
- The Sea Wolves (1980) as Hilliard
- Clash of the Titans (1981) as Acrisius
