= A Nightingale Sang in Berkeley Square (film) =

1979 British heist film

- Directed by: Ralph Thomas
- Written by: Guy Elmes(story and screenplay)
- Produced by: Benjamin Fisz
- Starring: Richard Jordan; Oliver Tobias; David Niven; Elke Sommer; Gloria Grahame; Hugh Griffith; Richard Johnson
- Cinematography: John Coquillon
- Edited by: Peter Boita
- Music by: Stanley Myers
- Production company: Benjamin Fisz Productions
- Release date: 14 May 1980
- Running time: 102 minutes
- Country: United Kingdom
- Language: English

A Nightingale Sang in Berkeley Square (also known as The Biggest Bank Robbery, Mayfair Bank Caper and The Big Scam) is a 1980 British heist film directed by Ralph Thomas, written by Guy Elmes and starring Richard Jordan, Oliver Tobias and David Niven. It is subtitled "based on one of the biggest robberies in London". The film takes its name from the 1940 published song "A Nightingale Sang in Berkeley Square".

Ralph Thomas later said the film "had quite a superb cast" and "he was really quite fond" of the movie "but I didn't do it as well as I should have done because by the time we started it David was already sick, and so we had to do the best we could as quickly as we could and it didn't come off as I'd hoped. But it was still a fun film and we enjoyed making it."

== Plot summary ==
Pinky is released from prison and has decided to go straight from now on, but takes a job as a maintenance man at a large bank, which gives him a lot of undue attention from "Ivan the Terrible", the local hoodlum. By using Pinky, Ivan hopes to rob the bank, and Pinky starts to like the idea of going back to his old ways.

== Cast ==
- Richard Jordan as Pinky
- Oliver Tobias as Foxy
- David Niven as Ivan
- Elke Sommer as Miss Pelham
- Gloria Grahame as Ma
- Richard Johnson as Inspector Watford
- Michael Angelis as Pealer Bell
- Brian Croucher as Gregory Peck
- Edward Peel as Jack Diamond
- Peter Cartwright as Major Treadwell
- Hugh Griffith as Sid Larkin
- Davy Kaye as Sid the Yid
- John Rhys-Davies as solicitor
- Robert Raglan as judge
- Sally Harris as Jill
- Ewen Solon as Commander Ford
- Bruce Boa as Morgan Stanfield
- Elizabeth Adare as barrister
- Stefan Kalipha as Ibrahim

== Production ==
The film was based on a real robbery in London in 1975.

It was shot at Twickenham Studios and on location around London in 1979. The film's sets were designed by the art director Lionel Couch.

== Release ==
The movie was given a charity premiere but appears not to have been screened theatrically.
