= Dermot Walsh =

Irish actor (1924–2002)

- Born: 10 September 1924; Dublin, County Dublin, Ireland
- Died: 26 June 2002 (aged 77); Tunbridge Wells, Kent, England
- Education: University College Dublin
- Spouses: Hazel Court (m. 1949; div. 1963) Diana Scougall (m. 1968; div. 1974) Elizabeth Madeleine Annear (m. 1974; died 1993)
- Children: 4, including Elisabeth Dermot Walsh

Dermot Walsh (10 September 1924 – 26 June 2002) was an Irish stage, film and television actor, known for portraying King Richard the Lionheart in the 1962 television series Richard the Lionheart.

== Early life ==
Born in Dublin, Ireland, Walsh was the son of a journalist and a civil servant. He attended St Mary's College, Rathmines, and on the wishes of his parents, read Law at University College Dublin. Walsh studied acting at the Abbey Theatre School and spent three years with Lord Longford's repertory company at the Gate Theatre, working as an assistant stage hand.

== Career ==
In 1945, Walsh moved to Britain and briefly joined the Croydon Repertory. Upon his return to Dublin, he was spotted by a talent scout from the Rank Organisation. This led to parts in Bedelia, Hungry Hill and The Mark of Cain, and the beginning of Walsh's career in film. He appeared in seven films as a leading man, before returning to the theatre. Walsh later resumed his film career in a series of B movies. He appeared in more than forty films made for film and a hundred for television, making his final film appearance in 1983.

Walsh made his first London stage appearance in George Bernard Shaw's Buoyant Billions at the Prince's Theatre in 1949. A prolific theatre actor, Walsh's many theatre credits included Reluctant Heroes, The Man Most Likely To, Laburnum Grove and The Mousetrap. He also turned his hand to writing and producing, writing the play The Murder Line in 1967 and producing later productions, including Blithe Spirit and Stage Struck.

Walsh's television work included appearances in Danger Man, No Hiding Place and Softly, Softly. He also played the title role in all 39 half-hour episodes of the series Richard the Lionheart in 1962 and 1963.

== Personal life ==
Walsh was married three times. He married the actress Hazel Court in 1949, and the couple had a daughter, Sally (born 1950), before they were divorced in 1963. He next married another actress, Diana Scougall, in 1968, and the couple had a son, Michael (born 1969), before they were divorced in 1974. He married a third actress, Elizabeth Annear, that same year, and the couple had two daughters, Elisabeth Dermot Walsh (born 1974), herself now an actress, and Olivia (born 1977). Elizabeth Annear died in 1993.

== Filmography ==
- 1946 : Bedelia : Jim (Doctor's Chauffeur)
- 1947 : The Mark of Cain : Jerome Thorn
- 1947 : Hungry Hill : Wild Johnnie
- 1947 : Jassy : Barney Hatton
- 1948 : My Sister and I : Graham Forbes
- 1948 : Third Time Lucky : Lucky
- 1948 : To the Public Danger : Captain Cole
- 1950 : Torment : Cliff Brandon
- 1952 : The Floating Dutchman : Alexander James
- 1952 : The Straw Man : Mal Farris
- 1952 : The Frightened Man : Julius Roselli
- 1952 : Ghost Ship : Guy Thornton
- 1953 : The Blue Parrot : Bob Herrick
- 1953 : Counterspy : Manning
- 1954 : Night of the Full Moon, a.k.a. Night of the Silvery Moon : Robby
- 1956 : The Hideout : Steve Curry
- 1956 : Bond of Fear : John Sewell
- 1957 : At the Stroke of Nine : MacDonnell
- 1957 : The Gentle Killers (TV) : Paul Donaldson
- 1958 : A Woman of Mystery : Ray Savage
- 1958 : Sea Fury : Kelso
- 1958 : Chain of Events : Quinn
- 1958 : Sea of Sand : Commanding Officer
- 1959 : Crash Drive : Paul Dixon
- 1959 : Make Mine a Million : Martin Russell
- 1959 : The Witness : Richard Brinton
- 1959 : The Flesh and the Fiends : Dr Geoffrey Mitchell
- 1959 : The Bandit of Zhobe : Captain Saunders
- 1959 : The Crowning Touch : Aubrey Drake
- 1960 : The Challenge : Detective Sergeant Willis
- 1960 : Shoot to Kill : Mike Roberts
- 1960 : The Trunk : Henry Maitland
- 1960 : The Tell-Tale Heart : Carl Loomis
- 1961 : Tarnished Heroes : Major Roy Bell
- 1961 : The Breaking Point : Robert Wade
- 1961 : Out of the Shadow : Professor Taylor
- 1962 : The Switch : Inspector Tomlinson
- 1962 : Emergency : John Bell
- 1962 : The Cool Mikado : Elmer
- 1962 : Richard the Lionheart : Richard the Lionheart
- 1963 : Echo of Diana : Phil Scott
- 1966 : The Scales of Justice : Dr Anthony Searle (episode "Infamous Conduct")
- 1969 : Journey to the Unknown : Ken Talbot (episode "Matakitas Is Coming")
- 1983 : The Wicked Lady : Lord Marwood
- 1993 : The Princess and the Cobbler : Brigand (voice)
