= Margaret Barton =

British actress (born 1926)

- Born: Margaret Ann Barton; 27 May 1926 (age 100); Finsbury Park, London, England
- Occupation: Actress
- Years active: 1938–1998
- Spouses: Raymond James (m. 1949; died 2016) Rob Cave (m. 2018; died 2023)

Margaret Ann Barton (born 27 May 1926) is a British retired actress. She is best known for her role in the 1945 David Lean film Brief Encounter in which she played Beryl Walters, a girl who works in the railway station cafe.

== Early career ==
Barton began acting in the theatre at the age of 12. Because she was small for her age, during World War II she portrayed children and young women. At 17 she appeared in Pink String and Sealing Wax at the Duke of York's Theatre and remembered performing while doodlebugs flew overhead. While on the West End stage, she was spotted by David Lean and Noël Coward and cast for the part of Beryl in Brief Encounter. Her scenes were shot at Denham Film Studios, and for other scenes she was invited by Lean to watch from behind the camera.

== Postwar ==
After the war, Barton continued acting on stage, in film, and for television. She married Raymond James; their son, Michael, died of cancer at the age of 30, and his parents set up the Michael James Music Trust in his memory. Raymond James died in 2016, aged 93. Barton lives in Dorset, where she runs a tea room, and still receives many letters relating to Brief Encounter. On 30 August 2018, aged 92, she married Rob Cave, aged 91, in Wimborne. Their combined age of 183 was believed to make them Britain's oldest newlyweds.

Barton turned 100 in May 2026.

== Filmography ==
Year	Title	Role	Notes
1945	Brief Encounter	Beryl Walters – Tea Room Assistant	
1947	Temptation Harbour	Betty Mallison	
1948	Good-Time Girl	Agnes	
1948	Fly Away Peter	Myra Hapgood	
1949	Landfall	Rick's Sister	
1949	The Romantic Age	Bessie	
1952	The Happy Family	Anne	
1954	The Gay Dog	Peggy	
1983	Chautauqua Girl	Mrs. Lucas	

== See also ==
- List of centenarians (actors, filmmakers and entertainers)
