= Fly Away Peter (1948 film) =

British comedy-drama by Charles Saunders

- Directed by: Charles Saunders
- Screenplay by: Arthur Reid
- Based on: play by A.P. Dearsley
- Produced by: Henry Passmore
- Starring: Patrick Holt; Margaret Barton; Peter Hammond
- Cinematography: Roy Fogwell
- Edited by: Gerald Landau
- Music by: Christopher Shaw
- Production company: Highbury Productions
- Release date: 1948
- Running time: 59 minutes
- Country: United Kingdom
- Language: English

Fly Away Peter is a 1948 British second feature ('B') comedy-drama film directed by Charles Saunders and starring Patrick Holt, Margaret Barton and Peter Hammond. It was written by Arthur Reid based on the play of the same name by A.P. Dearsley and produced by Highbury Productions.

== Plot ==
Mr and Mrs. Hapgood are a middle-aged middle-class suburban couple, with four children. Mr Hapgood is unassertive; Mrs Hapgood is possessive. Each of the children leave home either to work abroad or to marry, much to he dismay of Mrs Hapgood. Eventually, when the youngest daughter is willing to stay at home for the sake of her mother's happiness, Mrs. Hapgood realises that she must accept the inevitability of the break-up of the family.

== Cast ==
- Patrick Holt as John Nielson
- Margaret Barton as Myra Hapgood
- Peter Hammond as George Harris
- Frederick Piper as Mr Hapgood
- Kathleen Boutall as Mrs Hapgood
- Nigel Buchanan as Arthur Hapgood
- John Singer as Ted Hapgood
- Elspet Gray as Phyllis Hapgood
- Josephine Stuart as Dandy

== Reception ==
The Monthly Film Bulletin wrote: "Based on the play of the same name, the film, which is little altered, remains necessarily static. There is, however, the same neat dialogue and quiet insight into ordinary domestic affairs that characterised the play, and although not in essence a film – the three acts are still too clearly defined, for one thing – Fly Away Peter is painstakingly made and entertaining. The best performance undoubtedly comes from Margaret Barton as the wholly practical and delightful younger daughter; but she is run a very close second by Peter Hammond in his study of her amiable boy friend."

Kine Weekly wrote: "Margaret Barton as Myra has quite a way with her and should go far. Frederick Piper and Kathleen Boutall are true to type as Mr and Mrs. Hapgood, but a few of the supporting players are a trifle stiff. The film is one of words rather than deeds, but its lifelike leading characters move easily about the parlour and extract pleasing sentiment and wholesome laughter from its fireside theme. Of much the same kidney as Dear Octopus, its family and popular appeal is confidently assured. It's the first woman's featurette to come out of Highbury."

Picture Show wrote: "Unpretentious, agreeable little suburban domestic drama, showing the concern of a fond father and possessive mother when their children leave the parental nest to try their wings. It is acted with understanding and directed with humour,"

Picturegoer wrote: "Simple, homely humour is the keynote of the film."

The Daily Film Renter wrote: "Pleasant family entertainment. ...Puppy-love romance of Margaret Barton with Peter Hammond is easily the brightest part of the picture."

In British Sound Films: The Studio Years 1928–1959 David Quinlan rated the film as "average", writing: "Rather stagey but agreeable little picture."
