= The Large Rope =

1953 film by Wolf Rilla

- Directed by: Wolf Rilla
- Written by: Ted Willis
- Produced by: Victor Hanbury
- Starring: Donald Houston; Susan Shaw; Robert Brown
- Cinematography: Geoffrey Faithfull
- Edited by: Peter Graham Scott
- Music by: Ronald Binge
- Production company: Victor Hanbury Productions (as Insignia)
- Distributed by: United Artists Corporation (UK)
- Release date: December 1953 (UK)
- Running time: 72 minutes
- Country: United Kingdom
- Language: English

The Large Rope (also known as The Long Rope) is a 1953 British second feature ('B') crime film directed by Wolf Rilla and starring Donald Houston, Susan Shaw and Robert Brown. The screenplay was by Ted Willis, from a story by Willis and Julian Wintle.

== Plot ==
Tom Penney returns to his village after serving three years in prison for an assault that he did not commit, determined to take his revenge on those who framed him. He meets hostility from most of the village including his father, but his mother is glad to see him. Tom's former girlfriend, Susan, who is to be married that day, finds her old feelings for him resurfacing.

Amy Jordan, the flirtatious married woman Tom is supposed to have assaulted three years ago, is found dead in nearby woods just as the wedding is due to begin, and Susan runs from the church when she hears the news. Tom is taken in by the police for questioning, but escapes, and both he and the police try to discover the killer, while most of the villagers, convinced that Tom is the murderer, form a lynch mob.

== Cast ==
- Donald Houston as Tom Penney
- Susan Shaw as Susan Hamble
- Robert Brown as Mick Jordan
- Vanda Godsell as Amy Jordan
- Peter Byrne as Jeff Stribling
- Leonard White as PC Kensall
- Richard Warner as Inspector Harmer
- Christine Finn as May
- Thomas Heathcote as James Gore
- Katie Johnson as grandmother (uncredited)
- Hilda Fenemore as pub landlady (uncredited)
- Edward Judd as Jeff's Friend (uncredited)
- Dudley Jones as pub landlord (uncredited)

== Critical reception ==
Kine Weekly wrote: "The direction is a bit woolly and the cast uneven, but warm and sunny countryside backgrounds help to round off its ragged edges. ... The picture's cross-sections of life in green pastures are somewhat raw, but its calm, rustic atmosphere is authentic and gives essential contrast to its homicidal plot. Donald Houston displays very little animation as Tom, but Susan Shaw pleases as Susan, and Robert Brown makes a wicked Mick. The dénouement, although obvious, is robust rough house and completely in accord with the down-to-earth sentiments. By, and large, compact and hearty screen barnstorming."

Picturegoer wrote: "A man serves a prison sentence for murder. On his release he returns to his native village determined to clear himself. That's all. But the very simplicity of the whole thing carries weight. Donald Houston could, with advantage, have been more animated as the man with a mission. On the other hand, Susan Shaw is really bright as the girl who still believes in his innocence."

In British Sound Films: The Studio Years 1928–1959 David Quinlan rated the film as "mediocre", writing: "Leisurely, rather wearisome 'who dunnit'."

The film historians Steve Chibnall and Brian McFarlane describe The Large Rope as an "excellent thriller", adding that it has "an arresting narrative premise and an unsentimental view of the potential mean-spiritedness of village life".
