= Cool for Cats (TV series) =

British TV series

- Created by: Joan Kemp-Welch
- Directed by: Joan Kemp-Welch; Brian Taylor; Daphne Shadwell; John Hamilton
- Presented by: Ker Robertson (December 1956); Kent Walton (January 1957-February 1961)
- Starring: choreographer Dougie Squires; Peter Darrell (April 1959-
- Country of origin: United Kingdom
- No. of episodes: 242 episodes (mostly transmitted live)

Production
- Running time: 15–30 minutes
- Production company: Associated Rediffusion

Original release
- Network: ITV
- Release: 31 December 1956 – 8 February 1961

Related
- Channel 4 Hot For Dogs (lasted 1 series)

Cool for Cats was one of the first shows on British TV to feature music for a teenage audience. It was produced by Associated Rediffusion, part of the ITV network, and ran from December 1956 to February 1961.

The show was originally presented by Daily Sketch journalist Ker Robertson and then by Kent Walton. Ker gave up presenting duties and took on the role of record arranger. The show lasted 15 minutes. Discs were played and then commented upon. Sometimes The Dougie Squires Dancers, which included the then unknown Una Stubbs, Amanda Barrie, and Patsy Rowlands, who performed dance routines to the music. Sometimes Desmond Hennessy, and later by Neville Wortman would draw a relevant cartoon a 'Cool Cartoon', while the record played.

It was originally described by the TV Times (listing magazine) as “An intimate record programme in which Ker Robertson brings viewers the hits and near hits, the songs, music and stories of the people who make discs a £25,000,000 a year business”.

The programme was originally broadcast (only in the London area) on Mondays at 7:15 pm and then later moved to Fridays. Owing to its success, it was a twice-weekly show (the second show was a repeat), later expanding to half an hour. It got national exposure across other early ITV regions. The show's initiator was director Joan-Kemp Welch, the drama innovator, and the first—and the show's longest-running—choreographer was Dougie Squires.

Parlophone Records released a tie-in series of Cool For Cats EPs in 1959 featuring Ken Jones and His Coolmen, while Kent Walton and Don Lang made a 45 using Waltion's end-of-show catch-phrase "See You Friday?" in August 1959.
