= Peggy Evans =

British actress (1921–2015)

- 1950s postcard
- Born: 10 January 1921; Sheffield, West Riding of Yorkshire, England
- Died: 26 July 2015 (aged 94); England
- Resting place: St Paul's Churchyard, Buckinghamshire, England
- Occupation: Actress
- Years active: 1934-1961
- Spouse(s): Michael Howard (1949–1956, divorce); Peter Stevens (1990–?, his death)

Peggy Evans (10 January 1921 – 26 July 2015) was an English actress. She trained at the Rank Organisation's The Company of Youth (a "charm school").

== Early years ==
One of four children, Evans was born in Sheffield but grew up in Ealing, west London. As a teenager, her winning a creative writing contest earned her a screen test with the Rank Organization.

== Film ==
After having bit parts in Lightning Conductor (1938) and Charley's (Big-Hearted) Aunt (1940), Evans entered the Royal Academy of Dramatic Art for training. Her work in Penny and the Pownall Case (1948) was praised in Monthly Film Review: "Peggy Evans ... is a sparkling heroine, who not only looks extremely attractive but acts with naturalness and charm as well." She had a prominent role in The Blue Lamp, playing the girlfriend of Dirk Bogarde's young mobster. On stage she appeared in the 1953 West End play Four Winds.

== Personal life ==
Evans was married twice: to actor Michael Howard from 1949 to 1956; the union produced two children but ended in divorce. She married, secondly, to Peter Stevens in 1990; the couple remained together until his death in 1997. In later years, she learned Portuguese and lived in the Algarve for part of each year.

== Death ==
On 26 July 2015, at age 94, Evans died in England. She was survived by a son and a daughter.

== Filmography ==
Year	Title	Role	Notes
1934	Colonel Blood	Nancy	
1938	Lightning Conductor	Girl on bus	Uncredited
1940	Charley's (Big-Hearted) Aunt	Girl	Uncredited
1946	School for Secrets	Daphne Adams	
1948	Penny and the Pownall Case	Penny Justin	
1948	Love in Waiting	Gloria 'Golly' Raine	
1948	Look Before You Love	Typist	
1949	The Blue Lamp	Diana Lewis	
1951	Calling Bulldog Drummond	Molly	
1953	Murder at 3am	Joan Lawton	(final film role)
