= Love in Waiting =

1948 British comedy film

- Directed by: Douglas Peirce
- Screenplay by: Martin Lane; Arthur Reid
- Based on: original idea by Monica Dickens
- Produced by: John Croydon; Henry Passmore
- Starring: David Tomlinson; Peggy Evans; Elspet Gray
- Cinematography: Roy Fogwell
- Edited by: Dennis Gurney
- Music by: Temple Abady
- Production company: Highbury Productions
- Distributed by: GFD (UK)
- Release date: 17 January 1949 (UK)
- Running time: 60 minutes
- Country: United Kingdom
- Language: English

Love in Waiting is a 1948 British comedy film directed by Douglas Peirce, and starring David Tomlinson. It was made at Highbury Studios as a second feature for release by the Rank Organisation.

== Plot ==
In a busy restaurant during the food rationing period in the wake of Second World War, three waitresses fall in love with the manager (Tomlinson), the garbage man (who is the owner's grandson in disguise), and the downstairs neighbour - while trying to stay in the good books of the ruthless Miss Bell, who runs the catering staff and is selling restaurant food supplies to the Black Market.

== Cast ==
- David Tomlinson as Robert Clitheroe
- Andrew Crawford as Dick Lambert
- Peggy Evans as Gloria 'Golly' Raine
- Elspet Gray as Brenda Lawrence
- Patsy Drake as Mary Corder
- George Merritt as James Hartley Pepperfield
- Eliot Makeham as Sam Baxter
- John Witty as Harry Pepperfield
- Linda Gray as Miss Bell

== Critical reception ==
TV Guide called it an "uninteresting farce"; while the only positive The British 'B' Film was able to conclude, was that "at least the hour long Love in Waiting has brevity on its side."
