= Hazel Court =

English actress (1926–2008)

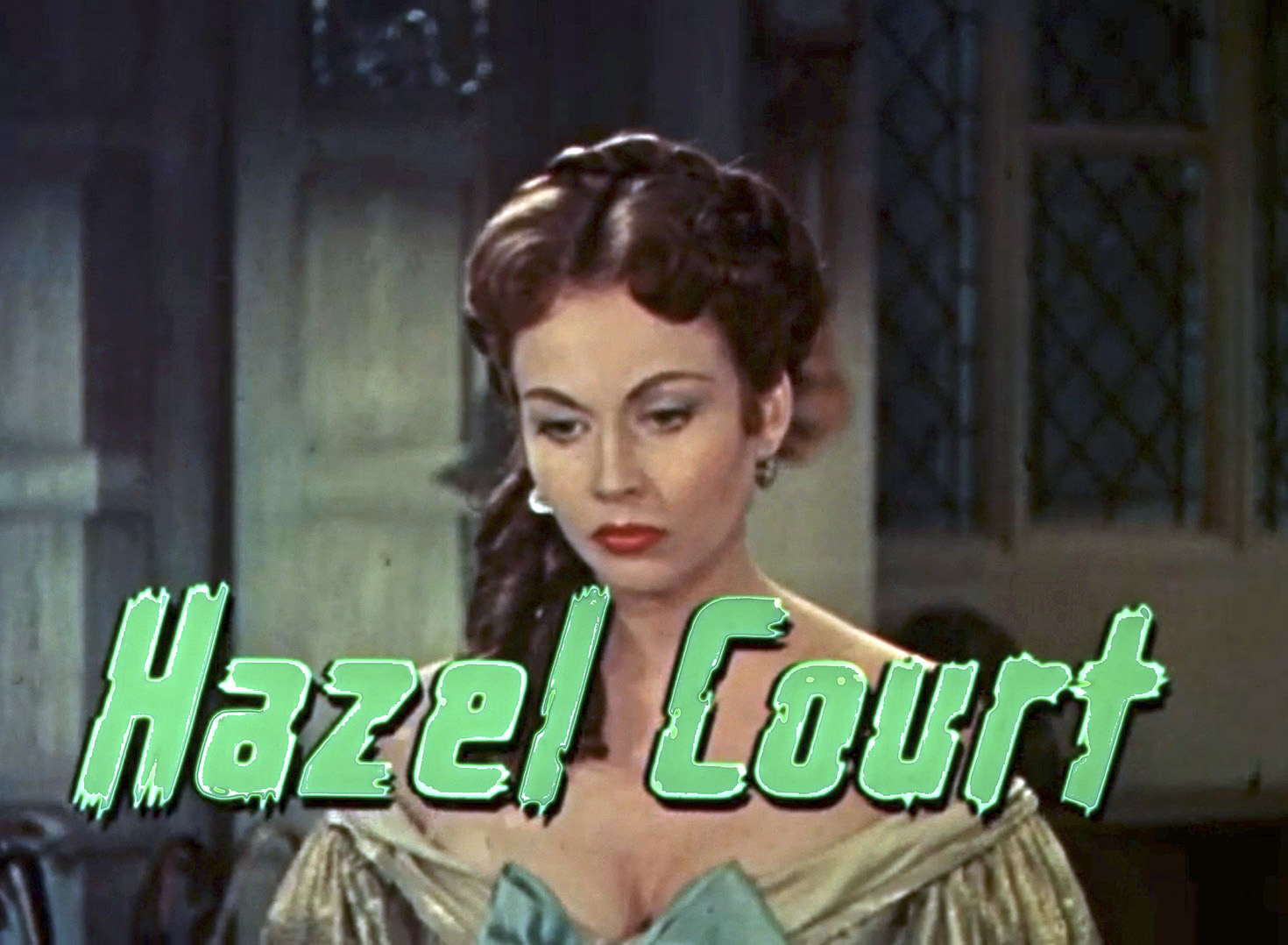
- Court in the trailer for The Curse of Frankenstein (1957)
- Born: 10 February 1926; Handsworth, Birmingham, England
- Died: 15 April 2008 (aged 82); Lake Tahoe, California, U.S.
- Education: The Company of Youth
- Occupations: Actress; artist
- Years active: 1944–1981
- Known for: The Curse of Frankenstein; The Man Who Could Cheat Death; The Raven
- Spouses: Dermot Walsh (m. 1949; div. 1963) Don Taylor (m. 1963; died 1998)
- Children: 3

Margery Hazel Court (10 February 1926 – 15 April 2008) was an English actress. She is known for her roles in British and American horror films during the 1950s and early 1960s, including Terence Fisher's The Curse of Frankenstein (1957) and The Man Who Could Cheat Death (1959) for Hammer Film Productions, and three of Roger Corman's adaptations of Edgar Allan Poe stories for American International Pictures: The Premature Burial (1962), The Raven (1963) and The Masque of the Red Death (1964).

== Early life ==
Court was born in Handsworth, Birmingham. Her father, G.W. Court, was a cricketer who played for Durham CCC. She attended Boldmere School and Highclare College, and later studied drama at the Birmingham Repertory Theatre and the Alexandra Theatre.

== Career ==
At sixteen, Court met film director Anthony Asquith in London; the meeting gained her a brief part in Champagne Charlie (1944). Court won a British Critics Award for her role as a crippled girl in Carnival (1946). She also appeared in Holiday Camp (1947) and Bond Street (1948). Her first role in a fantasy film was in Ghost Ship (1952). Devil Girl from Mars (1954) was a low-budget film produced by the Danziger Brothers.

Court trained at the Rank Organisation's "charm school". She wanted to act in comedy films but also continued to appear in horror films and, in 1957, had what was to become a career-defining role in the first colour Hammer Horror film The Curse of Frankenstein (1957).

In the 1957–58 television season, she co-starred in a CBS sitcom filmed in Britain, Dick and the Duchess, as Jane Starrett, a patrician British woman married to an insurance claims investigator (Patrick O'Neal). Court appeared in an episode of The Buccaneers in 1957 titled "Gentleman Jack and the Lady". Court travelled back and forth between North America and Britain, appearing in four episodes of Alfred Hitchcock Presents. She had parts in A Woman of Mystery (1958); The Man Who Could Cheat Death (1959); an entry in the British film series the Edgar Wallace Mysteries (USA: The Edgar Wallace Mystery Theatre), The Man Who Was Nobody (1960); and in Doctor Blood's Coffin (1961) among others.

By the early 1960s, Court was based in the USA. She featured in the Edgar Allan Poe horror films The Premature Burial (1962) with Ray Milland, The Raven (1963) with Peter Lorre and Boris Karloff and The Masque of the Red Death (1964), the last two with Vincent Price. She appeared on occasion in the early 1960s TV anthology series, The Dick Powell Show (aka, The Dick Powell Theatre).

Court also appeared in episodes of several TV series, including Adventures in Paradise, Mission: Impossible, Bonanza, Dr. Kildare, Danger Man, Twelve O'Clock High, Burke's Law with Gene Barry, Sam Benedict starring Edmond O'Brien, Gidget with Sally Field, McMillan and Wife with Rock Hudson, Mannix, The Wild Wild West, Thriller hosted by Boris Karloff, Rawhide ("Incident of the Dowry Dundee") with Clint Eastwood, and in The Fear, the penultimate episode of the original 1959-1964 The Twilight Zone hosted by Rod Serling.

Court appeared briefly in Omen III: The Final Conflict (uncredited, 1981).

In addition to acting, she studied sculpting in Italy and was a painter and sculptor.

== Personal life ==
Court was married to actor Dermot Walsh from 1949 until 1963. They had a daughter, Sally Walsh, who appeared with her mother in The Curse of Frankenstein. In 1964, Court married actor and director Don Taylor, whom she met while they were shooting an episode of Alfred Hitchcock Presents. They had two children. They were married until Taylor's death in 1998.

== Death ==
Court died of a heart attack at her home near Lake Tahoe, California, on 15 April 2008, aged 82. Her autobiography, Horror Queen, was released in the UK by Tomahawk Press a week after her death.

== Selected filmography ==
- 1944: Champagne Charlie - Tipsy Champagne Drinker (uncredited)
- 1944: Dreaming - Miss Grey / Wren / Avalah
- 1946: Gaiety George (a.k.a. Showtime) - Elizabeth Brown
- 1946: Carnival - May Raeburn
- 1947: Hungry Hill - Minor Role (uncredited)
- 1947: The Root of All Evil - Rushie
- 1947: Meet Me at Dawn - Gabrielle Vermorel
- 1947: Dear Murderer - Avis Fenton
- 1947: Holiday Camp - Joan Huggett
- 1948: My Sister and I - Helena Forsythe
- 1948: Bond Street - Julia Chester-Barrett
- 1949: Forbidden - Jeannie Thompson
- 1952: Ghost Ship - Margaret Thornton
- 1953: Counterspy (a.k.a. Undercover Agent) - Clare Manning
- 1954: Devil Girl from Mars - Ellen
- 1954: The Scarlet Web - Susan Honeywell
- 1954: A Tale of Three Women - Trude (segment "Wedding Gift' story)
- 1956: The Narrowing Circle - Rosemary Speed
- 1956: Behind the Headlines - Maxine
- 1957: Hour of Decision - Peggy Sanders
- 1957: The Curse of Frankenstein - Elizabeth
- 1958: A Woman of Mystery - Joy Grant
- 1958: Alfred Hitchcock Presents (Season 3 Episode 34: "The Crocodile Case") - Phyllis Chaundry-Lyons
- 1958: The Invisible Man (TV Series) - ' The Mink Coat ' - Penny Page
- 1959: Alfred Hitchcock Presents (Season 4 Episode 24: "The Avon Emeralds") - Lady Gwendolyn Avon
- 1959: Alfred Hitchcock Presents (Season 5 Episode 1: "Arthur") - Helen Brathwaite
- 1959: Model for Murder - Sally Meadows
- 1959: Breakout - Rita Arkwright
- 1959: The Man Who Could Cheat Death - Janine Du Bois
- 1960: The Shakedown - Mildred Eyde
- 1960: Bonanza (Tv Series, Episode: "The Last Trophy") - Lady Beatrice Dunsford
- 1960: Edgar Wallace Mysteries (US: The Edgar Wallace Mystery Theatre), "The Man Who Was Nobody" - Marjorie Stedman
- 1960–1961: Danger Man (TV Series) - Francesca / Noelle Laurence
- 1961: Alfred Hitchcock Presents (Season 6 Episode 29: "The Pearl Necklace") - Charlotte Jameson Rutherford
- 1961: Dr. Blood's Coffin - Nurse Linda Parker
- 1961: Thriller (TV Series) - Leonie Vicek
- 1961: Mary Had a Little... - Laurel Clive
- 1961: Stagecoach West Episode: "Finn McCool" - Sybil Allison
- 1962: The Premature Burial - Emily Gault
- 1963: The Raven - Lenore Craven
- 1964: Rawhide (TV Series, Episode: "Incident of the Dowery Dundee") - Kathleen Dundee
- 1964: The Twilight Zone (TV Series, Episode: "The Fear") - Charlotte Scott
- 1964: The Masque of the Red Death - Juliana
- 1966: Mission: Impossible (TV Series, season 2 ep. 10: "Charity") - Catherine Hagar
- 1972: McMillan & Wife (TV Series, Episode: "The Face of Murder") - Frances Mayerling
- 1981: Omen III: The Final Conflict - Champagne Woman At Hunt (uncredited) (final film role)

== Works ==
- Court, Hazel (23 April 2008). Horror Queen: An Autobiography. Tomahawk Press. ISBN 978-0-9531926-8-7.
