= Bang! You're Dead =

1954 British film by Lance Comfort

- Contemporary trade advertisement
- Directed by: Lance Comfort
- Written by: Ernest Borneman; Guy Elmes
- Produced by: Lance Comfort
- Starring: Jack Warner; Veronica Hurst; Derek Farr
- Cinematography: Brendan J. Stafford
- Edited by: Francis Bieber
- Music by: Eric Spear
- Production company: Wellington Films
- Distributed by: British Lion Films
- Release date: 16 March 1954
- Running time: 88 minutes
- Country: United Kingdom
- Language: English

Bang! You're Dead, also known as Game of Danger, is a 1954 British second feature ('B') psychological drama film directed by Lance Comfort and starring Jack Warner, Anthony Richmond, Veronica Hurst, Derek Farr and Sean Barrett. It was written by Ernest Borneman and Guy Elmes. When a child accidentally kills a man, the child and his companion struggle to comprehend the gravity of what has happened.

== Plot ==
Seven year old Cliff Bonsell lives a lonely life with his very elderly and widowed father in a hut on a decommissioned American army munitions stores depot in rural England.

Cliff has few friends, his main companion being the slightly older Willy Maxted, a quiet and introverted child who lives nearby with his grandmother. Cliff has developed a fascination for guns from films he has seen, regarding them as fun toys with which to play imaginative games. Willy's main interest is his gramophone and a single recording: "Bang! She's Dead/Lazy Day".

Cliff discovers an old army service revolver left behind at the depot and is thrilled to have found a realistic toy to play with. He and Willy are out together when they come across unpopular local Ben Jones. Cliff decides to tease him by threatening him with the gun cowboy-style. When Jones refuses to play along, Cliff pulls the trigger, not realising that the gun is still loaded with live bullets. Jones collapses and the pair at first think he is play-acting, but soon realise that he is dead. They flee the scene in panic.

Jones's body is discovered shortly afterwards by Bob Carter, who alerts the local police. Carter also finds the gun and pockets it. However, when investigating detective Gray learns that Carter and Jones had recently been involved in a fight over the attentions of the flirtatious Hilda, Carter becomes the main suspect and is taken in for questioning. Cliff and Willy become increasingly tormented as they try to weigh up whether it is better to let an innocent man be punished, or to confess to what actually happened and face what they see as the fearful consequences. Meanwhile, Grey gradually comes to realise that the case may not be as clear-cut as it first appeared.

== Cast ==
- Jack Warner as Bonsell
- Anthony Richmond as Cliff Bonsell
- Sean Barrett as Willy Maxted
- Derek Farr as Detective Gray
- Veronica Hurst as Hilda
- Michael Medwin as Bob Carter
- Gordon Harker as Mr. Hare
- Beatrice Varley as Mrs. Maxted
- Philip Saville as Ben Jones
- John Warwick as Sgt. Gurney
- Toke Townley as Jimmy Knuckle

== Production ==
The film was shot at Shepperton Studios with sets designed by the art director Norman G. Arnold. It was distributed by British Lion Films.

The public house "Who'd A Thought It" was in Nine Mile Ride, Crowthorne. It was closed and demolished in 2003.

== Critical reception ==
The Monthly Film Bulletin wrote: "Indifferently directed and photographed (the woodland settings might have been employed to better account), this is a second-rate melodrama which gives rather the impression of cashing in on the current screen fashion for involving children in crimes of violence. Scenes such as Cliff's flight through the woods appear to be used to win sympathy from the audience by emphasising the child's terror, and, where the story is as contrived as it is here, the effect is slightly unpleasant."

The Time Out Film Guide describes it as "a strange little film [which] can't make up its mind whether it's a thriller or a piece of social conscience, but the performance of the boy lends it charm."

Leslie Halliwell called the film "[a] singularly pointless and unattractive melodrama."

The Radio Times Guide to Films gave the film 2/5 stars, writing: "Simply because the plot revolves around a young boy finding a gun and accidentally killing a much detested local man, only for the victim's most outspoken detractor to be arrested for murder, this minor British crime drama has been compared to both 1949's The Window and 1952's The Yellow Balloon. Yet there's considerably less insight into the boy's guilt-stricken torment than in either of those films, with director Lance Comfort settling for a mildly suspenseful countdown to the predictable climax."

Chibnall and McFarlane in The British 'B' Film wrote: "It is a picture that leaves one somewhat uneasy because its narrative ultimately eschews easy resolution."
