= Guy Elmes =

British screenwriter (1920–1998)

- Born: 22 July 1920; London, England, United Kingdom
- Died: December 1998 (aged 78); Berkshire, England, United Kingdom
- Occupation: Screenwriter
- Years active: 1949 - unknown

Guy Elmes (22 July 1920 – December 1998) was a British screenwriter. He served in the navy during World War Two with Louis Mountbatten and broke into films through his script The Planter's Wife which was filmed by Ken Annakin, who used Elmes on several more occasions.

== Select filmography ==
- Behold the Man (1949) - TV movie
- The Planter's Wife (1952)
- Counterspy (1953)
- The Flanagan Boy (1953)
- Wheel of Fate (1953)
- The Stranger's Hand (1954)
- Bang! You're Dead (1954)
- Across the Bridge (1957)
- Nor the Moon by Night (1958)
- Serious Charge (1959)
- Mission in Morocco (1959)
- London Calling (1960) (documentary)
- Pontius Pilate (1962)
- The Mystery of the Indian Temple (1963)
- The Captive City (1962)
- Stranglehold (1963)
- Submarine X-1 (1968)
- The Invincible Six (1970)
- The Night Visitor (1971)
- White Fang (1973)
- The Red Hand Gang (1977) - TV series
- A Nightingale Sang in Berkley Square (1979)
