= Penny and the Pownall Case =

1948 British film by Slim Hand

- Theatrical release lobby card
- Directed by: Slim Hand
- Written by: William Fairchild
- Based on: story by William Fairchild
- Produced by: John Croydon
- Starring: Ralph Michael; Peggy Evans
- Production company: Highbury Productions
- Distributed by: General Film Distributors
- Release date: 1948
- Country: United Kingdom
- Language: English

Penny and the Pownall Case is a 1948 British second feature mystery film, directed by Slim Hand and starring Ralph Michael, Peggy Evans, Diana Dors and Christopher Lee. It was written by William Fairchild.

== Plot ==
Penny Justin, a model, helps a Scotland Yard detective to hunt down a gang of criminals smuggling Nazi war criminals out of Europe. Cartoonist Jonathan Blair hides secret messages in his comic strips.

== Cast ==
- Ralph Michael as Michael Carson
- Peggy Evans as Penny Justin
- Christopher Lee as Jonathan Blair
- Diana Dors as Molly James
- Frederick Piper as policeman
- Olaf Pooley as Von Leicher
- Ethel Coleridge as Mrs Hodgson
- Sam Costa as reception clerk
- Dennis Vance as Crawford
- Shaun Noble as Pownall
- Philip Saville as police car driver
- John Lorrell as Fraser
- Peter Madren as Adams
- Duncan Carse as boatman

== Production ==
The film was made by Highbury Productions, part of the Rank Organisation, whose aim was to make 50-minute 'curtain-raisers' for Rank's feature films. It marked the first featured roles for both Diana Dors and Christopher Lee. They, and Peggy Evans, were members of Rank's 'Charm School', The Company of Youth.

According to Lee, "Only the technicians, working with a grim sense of purpose, were pros in the proper sense. Every other function, from direction to walk-on parts, was up for grabs." He called the film "a truly grisly free-for-all" and a "Z feature". He recalled that the cast were forced to watch the film being previewed and he found the experience extremely embarrassing. It was the first time he 'died' on screen.

Director Slim Hand was normally a production manager at Ealing. The music was by Elisabeth Lutyens, making her the first female British composer to score a feature film.

== Critical reception ==
The Monthly Film Bulletin wrote:

The film succeeds in holding one's interest from the outset, possibly because it comes straight to the point without seeking to confuse with purposeless side issues and false clues, with the result that the crime, its motives, and its consequences seem really convincing and plausible. Nevertheless, there are plenty of bright lines and deft comedy touches to offset the necessary melodramatic aspect of the film. It is unfortunate, therefore, that in such an otherwise admirably directed production the climatic sequence in which Penny helps Carson out of a tight corner by slogging somebody with a heavy book should be so clumsily handled as to appear almost ludicrous. The comparatively unknown cast prove more than equal to the demands made upon them. Peggy Evans, as Penny, is a sparkling heroine, who not only looks extremely attractive but acts with naturalness and charm as well, except in the sequence mentioned. Ralph Michael as Carson and Christopher Lee as Blair in their respective ways are equally good.

Bob Monkhouse wrote in his memoirs that when he saw the film he thought it was "really bad" but was impressed by Diana Dors. "It was her energy that at first attracted me," he wrote. "Her acting was raw but promising and her vitality made me remember her afterwards as if her part of the screen had been in colour."

Filmink said the "film was the first of many occasions where Dors would outshine the female lead, and make one wonder why she did not get a bigger part."
