= The Switch (1963 film) =

1963 British film by Peter Maxwell

- Opening credits
- Directed by: Peter Maxwell
- Screenplay by: Philip Ridgeway; Colin Fraser
- Story by: Philip Ridgeway
- Produced by: Philip Ridgeway; Lance Comfort
- Starring: Anthony Steel; Zena Marshall; Conrad Phillips
- Cinematography: Stephen Dade
- Edited by: Tom Simpson
- Music by: Eric Spear
- Production company: Philip Ridgeway Productions
- Distributed by: Rank Film Distributors
- Release date: May 1963
- Running time: 69 minutes
- Country: United Kingdom
- Language: English
- Budget: £24,000
- Box office: £22,009 (as at 31 Dec 1965)

The Switch is a 1963 British crime drama film directed by Peter Maxwell, and starring Anthony Steel, Zena Marshall and Conrad Phillips. It was written by Philip Ridgeway and Colin Fraser. The film concerns a criminal gang that smuggles watches into the UK by hiding them in the petrol tank of a woman's car. It was Susan Shaw's last film.

== Plot ==
Customs officer Bill Craddock is investigating a watch smuggling ring but reaches a dead end. Caroline Markham returns from holiday to find her flat occupied by her flatmate's cousin, John Curry. Caroline is kidnapped by the watch smuggling gang who think she has stolen their watches. Craddock rescues Caroline with the help of a miniature radio transmitter.

== Cast ==
- Anthony Steel as Bill Craddock
- Zena Marshall as Caroline Markham
- Conrad Phillips as John Curry
- Dermot Walsh as Inspector Tomlinson
- Susan Shaw as Search Officer
- Dawn Beret as Janice Lampton
- Jerry Desmonde as Customs Chief
- Arnold Diamond as Jean Lecraze
- Raymond Smith as Mandreos
- Tom Bowman as Polovski
- Arthur Lovegrove as Harry Lewis
- Gordon Boyd as Jack Knighton
- Kenneth Goodlet as Read
- Rose Alba as Bill's secretary
- Anthony Parker as Police Inspector
- Desmond Cullum-Jones as Merrall
- Yvonne Marsh as Nurse
- Jimmy Hanley as himself (uncredited)
- Peter Butterworth as fashion photographer (uncredited)

== Production ==
This was Anthony Steel's first film in Britain in a number of years, following his move to Rome.

== Critical reception ==
The Monthly Film Bulletin wrote: "Though the plot is largely routine, with the usual quota of coincidences and improbabilities, the film nevertheless has a quality of freshness in the bright and artless way it is treated. It bowls along quite merrily, and despite the hackneyed story, successfully avoids dullness"

According to TV Guide, "Audiences are likely to check their watches frequently during this lifeless crime thriller."
