= Chain of Events =

1958 film

- Directed by: Gerald Thomas
- Written by: Patrick Brawn; Leo McKern
- Produced by: Peter Rogers
- Starring: Susan Shaw; Dermot Walsh; Jack Watling
- Cinematography: Peter Hennessy
- Edited by: Peter Boita
- Production company: Beaconsfield Productions
- Distributed by: British Lion Film Corporation
- Release date: September 1958
- Running time: 62 minutes
- Country: United Kingdom
- Language: English

Chain of Events is a 1958 British crime film directed by Gerald Thomas and starring Susan Shaw, Dermot Walsh, Jack Watling, Freddie Mills and Joan Hickson. It was written by Patrick Brawn based on a radio play by Leo McKern.

== Plot ==
A London bank clerk (also called Clarke) evades the gaze of a busy bus conductor to avoid paying his bus fare, as he doesn't have the right fare. However, a bus inspector gets on and challenges him. He claims he had a ticket and that the conductor is lying. He is asked for his name and address. It turns into a formal complaint. He gives his name as John Stockman, one of his acquaintances whose address he knows.

Next we see the real John Stockman in court. It appears that the conductor and inspector think it is the same man. Stockman justifiably denies it and is very rude about the witnesses. He is fined £5, but the case gets in the local newspaper.

We next see Stockman in the bank and Clarke serving him, explaining how he knew the name and address. However, the reporter (Tom Quinn) is dragged in front of his editor as Stockman is an investor in the newspaper and is furious. Quinn is fired for not checking the story which is now going to retrial as Stockman has an alibi.

Quinn goes to a pub to drown his sorrows and is joined by Jill. In his drunken state, he starts blurting out other stories, including Lord Fenchurch's affair but other reporters are at the bar and Freddie overhears this gossip.

Meanwhile, Clarke goes to board his usual bus and is too embarrassed to get on when he sees the same conductor. He takes the train home instead and is late. He tells his wife that he will take the train in future as the bus is too crowded.

Freddie takes his acquired knowledge to a contact, Becket and they discuss blackmailing Lord Fenchurch.

Lord Fenchurch (the owner of Quinn's newspaper) discusses Lady Fenchurch's ill health with his secretary. He receives a blackmailing phone call asking for £2000. Lord Fenchurch confides to Jill that it is true and he has a lover called Simone. Jo is sent to see her. She's instructed to offer Simone money to deny all knowledge of the affair. During this visit, Jimmy Boy arrives, and seems to be another boyfriend. Jimmy Boy calls his friend Tiny to sort out the blackmailer.

Outside a post office, Freddie and the blackmailer watch for Lord Fenchurch, He arrives and takes an envelope into the post office. They go in and collect the £2000. They discuss asking for more but they cannot wait too long in case Lady Fenchurch dies as that would remove the motive for Lord Fenchurch to pay up.

Tom Quinn gets a new job at the paper, writing obituaries. Back in the bar, Freddie settles his bar tab with his new-found wealth and buys Quinn a drink.

Clarke starts becoming late for work, blemishing his perfect record.

Quinn decides to investigate Freddie's sudden wealth.

Becket calls Fenchurch for a second £2000. He tells Jill to phone Simone. Simone phones Jimmy Boy to set up an ambush with Tiny. Quinn watches events unfold as the money is dropped and Becket retrieves it as Tiny punches Freddie. Jimmy Boy jumps in the back of the car instead of Freddie. The car drives off, pursued by Quinn. The car crashes trying to avoid hitting Clarke. But Clarke, Jimmy Boy and Becket are killed.

Quinn returns the £2000 to Fenchurch.

== Cast ==
- Susan Shaw as Jill
- Dermot Walsh as Tom Quinn
- Jack Watling as Freddie
- Alan Gifford as Lord Fenchurch
- Harold Lang as Jimmy Boy
- Lisa Gastoni as Simone Day
- Kenneth Griffith as Clarke
- Ballard Berkeley as John Stockman
- Frank Forsythe as Johnson, bank clerk
- Cyril Chamberlain as bus conductor
- Freddie Mills as Tiny
- Martin Boddey as bus inspector
- Anthony Sagar as drunk
- Myrtle Reed as Mrs Clarke
- Martin Wyldeck as Becket
- James Raglan as magistrate
- Joan Hickson as barmaid
- John Stuart as bank manager

== Critical reception ==
The Monthly Film Bulletin wrote: "[the] plot ... is a pleasant enough parlour game, but provides a somewhat mechanical and unsatisfying series of coincidences for a film. But the pace is fast enough to disguise some of the improbabilities. Freddie Mills makes a brief but bizarre appearance as a moronic cheese-roll addict, while the script and acting deserve a better idea."

TV Guide wrote, "from a radio play written by talented British [sic] actor Leo McKern, but that's not sufficient reason to sit through it."

Picture Show wrote: "Competently directed and acted it puts a strain on one's credulity by the over-use of coincidence."

In British Sound Films: The Studio Years 1928–1959 David Quinlan rated the film as "mediocre", writing: "Circular story is packed with improbabilities but keeps up a good pace."

Cinemaretro wrote, "very much a B movie feature, the film stands firmly, and really works exceptionally well on its own merits."
