= Madge Brindley =

British actress (1901–1968)

- Madge Bridley in Hobson's Choice
- Born: Doreen Ilse Johnson; 15 October 1901; Bedford Park, London, England
- Died: 12 August 1969 (aged 67); Brighton, England
- Occupation: Actress
- Years active: 1934–1969

Madge Brindley (15 October 1901 – 28 August 1968) was a British repertory and film actress.

== Life ==
She was born, Doreen Ilse Johnson in Bedford Park, London, England. She was an actress, known in later life for her character parts, usually as loud and aggressive matronly women. She began her acting career in 1925 with the Birmingham Repertory Company in the play The Farmers Wife. She is best known for her film parts in The Spider and the Fly (1949), Alice in Wonderland (1946) and Hobson's Choice (1954), The Ladykillers (1955), A Kid for Two Farthings (1955) and for her role in Quatermass and the Pit (1958). She died on 28 August 1968 in Brighton, East Sussex, England in a road accident aged 67.

== Filmography ==
| Year | Title | Role | Notes |
|---|---|---|---|
| 1934 | Kentucky Minstrels | Landlady | |
| 1937 | The Song of the Road | Sideshow Owner | Uncredited |
| 1937 | The Lilac Domino | | Uncredited |
| 1938 | South Riding | A Psalm Singer | Uncredited |
| 1939 | On the Night of the Fire | Neighbour | Uncredited |
| 1943 | Yellow Canary | Newspaper Seller at Railway Station | Uncredited |
| 1946 | Piccadilly Incident | | Uncredited |
| 1947 | Take My Life | Lady with Children at Station | Uncredited |
| 1947 | The Ghosts of Berkeley Square | Matron | Uncredited |
| 1949 | The Third Man | Guest at Casanova Bar | Uncredited |
| 1949 | The Spider and the Fly | Jacques' Grandmother | |
| 1950 | Old Mother Riley, Headmistress | Mrs. Clarke | |
| 1951 | The Lady with a Lamp | Woman in Downing St crowd | |
| 1951 | Mr. Denning Drives North | Gypsy | Uncredited |
| 1951 | The Magic Box | Sitter in Bath Studio | |
| 1952 | A Killer Walks | Mrs. Ramble | |
| 1952 | Moulin Rouge | Minor Role | Uncredited |
| 1953 | The Beggar's Opera | Gin Seller | |
| 1954 | Hobson's Choice | Mrs. Figgins | |
| 1954 | Radio Cab Murder | Mrs. Evans | |
| 1954 | Trouble in the Glen | Old Tinker Woman | Uncredited |
| 1955 | A Kid for Two Farthings | Mrs. Quinn | Uncredited |
| 1955 | The Ladykillers | Large Lady | Uncredited |
| 1956 | The Feminine Touch | Other Patient | |
| 1957 | The Long Haul | Fat Café Proprietress | |
| 1960 | Sands of the Desert | Fat Lady in Bus | |
| 1960 | The Millionairess | Irate Patient | Uncredited |
| 1961 | Payroll | Wrong Mrs Pearson | Uncredited |
| 1962 | The Dock Brief | Mother Chiding Her Son | Uncredited |
| 1964 | Father Came Too! | | |
| 1966 | Alfie | Woman on Bus | Uncredited |
| 1967 | Casino Royale | Casino patron | Uncredited |
| 1968 | Till Death Us Do Part (film) | VJ Day Celebrator | |
| 1969 | A Nice Girl Like Me | Pensione Mama | |
