= David Henley (producer) =

British producer

David Henley (1894–1986) was a British actor, singer and film producer. He performed with Gilbert and Sullivan, and became an agent. He moved into casting and film producing.

== Select credits ==
- Murder at 3am (1953)
- The Legend of the Good Beasts (1956)
- The Devil's Pass (1957)
- Make Mine a Double (1959)
- Stranglehold (1963)
- Blaze of Glory (1963)
- The Comedy Man (1964)
- The Crooked Road (1965)
- Circus of Fear (1966)
- The Yellow Hat (1966)
- The Brides of Fu Manchu (1966)
