= Counterspy (film) =

1953 British film by Vernon Sewell

- British quad poster
- Directed by: Vernon Sewell
- Written by: Guy Elmes; Gaston Lazare
- Based on: short story Criss Cross Code by Julian Symons
- Produced by: William H. Williams
- Starring: Dermot Walsh; Hazel Court; Hermione Baddeley
- Cinematography: A.T. Dinsdale
- Edited by: Geoffrey Muller
- Music by: Eric Spear
- Production company: Abtcon Pictures
- Distributed by: Anglo-Amalgamated Film Distributors
- Release date: 1 August 1953 (UK)
- Running time: 68 minutes
- Country: United Kingdom
- Language: English

Counterspy (also known as Night People and Undercover Agent) is a 1953 British second feature comedy thriller film directed by Vernon Sewell and starring Dermot Walsh, Hazel Court and Hermione Baddeley. An accountant comes into possession of secret papers sought by both the government and a spy ring.

== Plot ==
When Frank Manning visits an engineering company to audit the accounts, he meets a woman who claims she is being blackmailed by Paulson, the company's director. She asks for Manning's help. Subsequently Manning is captured by a gang of spies, escapes, and he is re-captured, along with his wife Clare. They are taken to a bogus nursing home run by the gang. The police, who have been trailing Clare, arrest the gang.

== Cast ==
- Dermot Walsh as Frank Manning
- Hazel Court as Clare Manning
- Hermione Baddeley as Madame Del Mar
- Alexander Gauge as Smith
- Bill Travers as Rex
- Archie Duncan as Jim Fenton
- James Vivian as Larry Fenton
- Frederick Schrecker as Plattnaur
- John Penrose as Paulson
- Hugh Latimer as Inspector Barlow
- Beryl Baxter as Plattnauer's Accomplice
- Gwen Bacon as matron
- Maxwell Foster as Dr. Stevenson
- Howard Lang as policeman
- Monti DeLyle as dance director
- Frederick Buckland as police photographer
- Reginald Hearne as detective
- Paul Rich as music hall singer
- Edwin Richfield as safecracker
- Stuart Saunders as stagehand
- Ann Wrigg as nurse

== Production ==
It was one of a number of films Vernon Sewell directed for Anglo Amalgamated. Art Director was George Haslam.

== Critical reception ==
The Monthly Film Bulletin wrote: "A conventional but quite lively spy thriller, well supplied with action. Hermione Baddeley provides an effective character study as the fortune teller and Alexander Guage makes a suitably sinister and oily villain."

Kine Weekly wrote: "The picture is quickly off the mark and puts over its mayhem and murder against widely varied and appropriate backgrounds. Dermot Walsh acts convincingly as the bewildered but brave Manning, Hazel Court wears tights to perfection as Clare, Alexander Gauge makes his presence felt as the menacing Smith, John Penrose disarms as Paulson, and Hermione Baddeley introduces an amusing cameo as a fortune teller."

Picture Show wrote: "Fast-moving murder and crook drama with a London setting. ... Hazel Court looks very attractive as [Manning's] wife and Alexander Gauge is suitably sinister as an international crook."

Picturegoer wrote: "It needs a sure touch to blend comedy with espionage, and in this British thriller the mixture doesn't have much kick. ... Comedy gets so mixed up with the drama that it is difficult to tell which is which. Dermot Walsh makes a fair try in a semi-comedy role, but Hazel Court, as his wife, has little to do. Hermione Baddeley gives value for money in her cameo of a fortune teller. It's amusing in parts, but the yawns outstay the laughs."

In British Sound Films: The Studio Years 1928–1959 David Quinlan rated the film as "average", writing: "Comedy-thriller has a bit more life than average 'B'."

The Radio Times Guide to Films gave the film 2/5 stars, writing: "Some topicality is given to the otherwise threadbare plot – the spies are after plans for jet engines, and there's a chase through one of London's newest tourist attractions, the Festival Gardens on London's South Bank."

TV Guide called it "A routine spy picture," and rated it two out of five stars.
