= A Woman of Mystery =

1958 British film by Ernest Morris

- Directed by: Ernest Morris
- Written by: Brian Clemens; Eldon Howard
- Produced by: Edward J. Danziger; Harry Lee Danziger
- Starring: Dermot Walsh; Hazel Court
- Cinematography: James Wilson
- Edited by: Maurice Rootes
- Music by: Edwin Astley; Albert Elms
- Production company: Danziger Productions
- Distributed by: United Artists Corporation (UK)
- Release date: April 1958 (UK)
- Running time: 71 minutes
- Country: United Kingdom
- Language: English

A Woman of Mystery is a 1958 British crime film directed by Ernest Morris and starring Dermot Walsh, Hazel Court, and Ferdy Mayne. It was written by Brian Clemens and Eldon Howard and produced by The Danzigers.

The film features an early performance from Michael Caine in an uncredited role.

== Plot ==
Ray Savage, reporter for a sensational magazine in London is assigned, despite his objections, to investigate the suicide of a pretty blonde hat-check attendant. Inquiring at Jane Hale's place of work, he learns that someone from her past had recognised her, and she was afraid. Finding a luggage label on her suitcase, he follows the lead to a dubious hotel where the manager tells him someone had taken a shot at her while she was staying there. From there he goes to her former place of work, then to the home of her friend at work who tells him that Miss Hale regularly called her mother, long distance. He traces the phone number to a sanatorium, where questioning Mrs Hale yields nothing; however, the cooperative administrator tells him about the wealthy area where Jane was living before she went on the run.

Finding that she had been employed at an escort agency, he misses the indications that he is being followed, until he returns home and is attacked by three men who try to duplicate Miss Hale's supposed suicide by knocking him on the head and turning on the gas. Rescued by his girlfriend, he grabs a gun and establishes the escort agency is cover for a counterfeiting operation. He shoots it out with the villains but the mastermind behind the operation, the man who killed Jane, escapes unseen. However, Jane's new boyfriend comes after Ray to try to kill him and Jane's friend who came to talk to Ray.

== Cast ==
- Dermot Walsh as Ray Savage
- Hazel Court as Joy Grant
- Jennifer Jayne as Ruby Ames
- Ferdy Mayne as Andre
- Ernest Clark as Harvey
- Diana Chesney as Mrs Bassett
- Paul Dickson as Winter
- Michael Caine as henchman (uncredited)

== Critical reception ==
The Monthly Film Bulletin wrote: "A routine thriller of 'the time was now seven thirty and....'school, flatly presented and feebly acted."

In British Sound Films: The Studio Years 1928–1959 David Quinlan rated the film as "mediocre", writing: "Flat presentation nullifies a crisp, well constructed screenplay."
