= Bobo Faulkner =

- Born: Ann Helen Minchin; 2 January 1941; Dorset, England
- Died: 14 December 2014 (aged 73); Surrey, England
- Education: University of Cambridge; University of Surrey
- Occupations: Model; television personality; interior designer
- Spouse(s): Trader Faulkner; Ralph Rosenblum; Robin Lakin; Mike Brown
- Children: 1

Ann Helen "Bobo" Faulkner (née Minchin; 2 January 1941 – 14 December 2014) was an English model, television personality, and interior designer.

== Early life ==
She was born Ann Helen Minchin in Dorset, England, where her father was the headmaster of Shaftesbury Grammar School. Leaving school at 15, she moved to London as a secretary for a prestigious firm.

In London, she met and married the Australian actor Trader Faulkner, who gave her the nickname "Bobo" by which she went for the rest of her life. In 1966, the couple had a daughter, Sasha. Bobo moved to Australia in 1968 with her daughter after she was invited to take part in fashion parades as a model.

== Media career in Australia ==
In June 1968, Faulkner was hired by GTV9 to co-host breakfast television program, Today, with Mike Walsh. She also wrote a newspaper column for The Australian, and hosted Bobo's Late Show in which she introduced the Nine Network's midnight movie. In 1973, she made a documentary for ABC-TV called See It My Way – The Polysaturated Male, in which she called for the "liberation" of men from the demands and stereotypes placed upon them.

In the early 1970s, she made some acting appearances in such programs as police drama Division 4 and the comedy series The Group.

After her separation from Faulkner, she had a relationship with the Australian publicist Harry M. Miller, which ended after Miller claimed she had spread some gossip concocted by himself and Clyde Packer to test her discretion.

== England and San Francisco ==
She later met and married Sydney businessman Ralph Rosenblum, and in 1978, they returned to her native England where Faulkner studied writing at Cambridge University. In 1984, Faulkner and Rosenblum emigrated to the United States where they lived in the San Francisco Bay Area and founded Vogue Interiors, a successful chain of furniture design stores for which Faulkner worked as an interior designer and spokesperson.

In 1998, Rosenblum and Faulkner separated and she became an interior designer and businesswoman in her own right owning "Couch Casting" of Burlingame. In 2000, she married again to Robin Lyon Lakin (1938-2016), Anglo-Australian great-grandson of cement manufacturer Sir Michael Henry Lakin, 1st Baronet. An Old Etonian and lieutenant in the 11th Hussars, Lakin had first met Faulkner in the 1960s in London. In 2003, he was forced for health reasons to return to Australia. Due to immigration impediments on both sides of the Pacific to any permanent reunion, the couple decided to separate, Faulkner returning to her native England in 2004. She settled in the village of Grayswood and was married for the fourth time to Mike Brown who died in 2007. Faulkner returned to study, taking a two-year course in counselling at the University of Surrey.

She died in December 2014, ten months after being diagnosed with cancer.
