= Colonel Bogey (film) =

1948 British film by Terence Fisher

- Theatrical release poster
- Directed by: Terence Fisher
- Screenplay by: John Baines; William Fairchild
- Based on: an original story by John Baines
- Produced by: John Croydon
- Starring: Jack Train; Mary Jerrold
- Cinematography: Gordon Lang
- Edited by: Gordon Pilkington
- Music by: Norman Fulton
- Production companies: Highbury Productions; Production Facilities
- Distributed by: General Film Distributors (UK)
- Release date: September 1948 (UK)
- Running time: 51 minutes
- Country: United Kingdom
- Language: English

Colonel Bogey is a 1948 fantasy film directed by Terence Fisher, and starring Jack Train and Mary Jerrold. The spirit of a home's former owner refuses to pass on.

It was shot at Highbury Studios as a second feature.

== Cast ==
- Jack Train as Uncle James
- Mary Jerrold as Aunt Mabel
- Jane Barrett as Alice Graham
- John Stone as Wilfred Barriteau
- Ethel Coleridge as Emily
- Hedli Anderson as Millicent
- Bertram Shuttleworth as Cabby
- Charles Rolfe as Soldier
- Sam Kydd as Soldier
- Dennis Woodford as Chemist

== Critical reception ==
The Monthly Film Bulletin wrote: "This is a slight but amusing trifle in which Jack Train (who remains unseen throughout the film) skilfully builds up the bibulous, irascible character of Uncle James by means of his famous "Colonel Chinstrap" voice. Strong support is rendered, notably by Mary Jerrold as Aunt Mabel, and the rest of the small cast. It is a pity that the otherwise commendable attention paid to detail in the costumes and settings of the period (the early part of this century) should be marred by dustbins in one shot which look too modern for the time."

TV Guide called the film a "Pleasant little fantasy," rating it two out of five stars.
