= Marry Me! (1949 film) =

- Original British cinema poster
- Directed by: Terence Fisher
- Written by: Denis Waldock; Lewis Gilbert
- Produced by: Betty E. Box
- Starring: Derek Bond; Susan Shaw; Patrick Holt; Carol Marsh; David Tomlinson; Zena Marshall; Guy Middleton; Nora Swinburne
- Cinematography: Ray Elton
- Edited by: Gordon Pilkington
- Music by: Clifton Parker
- Production company: Gainsborough Pictures
- Distributed by: General Film Distributors (UK)
- Release date: 7 June 1949
- Running time: 97 minutes
- Country: United Kingdom
- Language: English
- Budget: £117,941
- Box office: £63,000 (by 1953) or £50,300

Marry Me! (alternative title: I Want to Get Married) is a 1949 British comedy film directed by Terence Fisher, and starring Derek Bond, Susan Shaw, Patrick Holt, Carol Marsh and David Tomlinson. It was written by Denis Waldock and Lewis Gilbert.

== Plot ==
Newspaper journalist David Haig is assigned by his Fleet Street editor to go undercover and write about the people behind the ads in the Marriage Chronicle, a weekly newspaper published by the Parsons marriage bureau. During his initial interview with owners Hester and Emily Parsons, he tells them he is an Australian sheepman and steals some of their files.

Dancehall hostess Pat Cooper is fed up with her life. She is paired with self-described "country bumpkin" Martin Roberts. He makes a good first impression; then she learns he is a clergyman and backs out. However, he persists and wins her over. He is on the point of asking for her hand in marriage when Brenda Delamere, her flatmate, inadvertently reveals her true occupation. After digesting the news, he decides he still wants her, but she pretends she was only toying with him and sends him away.

Frenchwoman Marcelle Duclos' permit is expiring, so she seeks a husband to remain in Britain, offering £500 as further inducement. Andrew Scott needs some capital to purchase a partnership. They are honest with each other about their reasons for marriage. After they fall in love, she informs him that she was the girlfriend of a charming, handsome man who turned out to be a thief and murderer named Louis Renier. When she learned he had escaped from prison, she fled to England. She is horrified to spot him. She confesses to Scott that she is actually Renier's wife. He refuses to leave her, despite the danger. Renier finds her and waits for Scott with a pistol. The two men struggle, and Renier falls over the balcony to his death.

Saunders, Sir Gordon Scott's valet, is retiring and buying a farm. The cynical Scott disapproves of marriage and women in general. Scott impersonates Saunders on the spur of the moment when Saunders' match, schoolteacher Enid Lawson, telephones. Upon meeting the woman, Scott deliberately behaves obnoxiously, but is impressed by her spirited rejection. When she starts to leave, he tries to explain his behaviour, but she slaps him. She returns, having forgotten her gloves, and all becomes clear to her when the real Saunders appears. She stays for dinner, served by Saunders. Afterwards, she is astonished to learn that not only has Saunders quickly deduced her identity, he also believes that she is not good enough for him. She departs posthaste. Scott cannot get her out of her mind and goes to the marriage bureau to try to obtain her address. Lawson has just left, but returns for her gloves, and all is eventually forgiven.

Miss Beamish is selected for Haig. He is unimpressed and leaves after a brief conversation. On the street, he bumps into Doris Pearson, the second choice of the bureau. They get along, but are each lying to the other. She claims she is from the upper class, whereas she is constantly making up fantasies about herself. When Haig's article is published, complete with a photograph, she sees it and breaks up with him, stating that she hates liars. He cannot find her, until he goes to the restaurant where she works as a waitress. He manages to persuade her to agree to marry him.

== Cast ==
- Derek Bond as Andrew
- Susan Shaw as Pat
- Patrick Holt as Martin
- Carol Marsh as Doris
- David Tomlinson as David
- Zena Marshall as Marcelle
- Guy Middleton as Sir Gordon
- Nora Swinburne as Enid
- Brenda Bruce as Brenda
- Jean Cadell as Hester Parsons
- Mary Jerrold as Emily Parsons
- Denis O'Dea as Saunders
- Yvonne Owen as Sue Carson
- Alison Leggatt as Miss Beamish
- Beatrice Varley as Mrs. Perrins
- Cyril Chamberlain as PC Jackson
- Hal Osmond as man in restaurant
- Russell Waters as Mr. Pearson
- Joan Hickson as Mrs. Pearson
- Marianne Stone as Elsie
- J. H. Roberts as old gent in train
- Lyn Evans as railway official
- Anthony Steel as Jack Harris (in one of his first appearances on screen)
- Albert Lieven as Louis Renier (uncredited)
- George Merritt as Gazette editor (uncredited)
- Eric Pohlmann as Mr. Cinelli (uncredited)
- John Salew as Charlie (uncredited)
- Anne Valery as girl in David's office (uncredited)

== Reception ==
=== Box office ===
The film was a box office flop, recording a loss of £67,600.

Producer's receipts were £38,200 in the UK and £12,100 overseas.

=== Critical ===
The Monthly Film Bulletin wrote: "This frivolous film brings little credit to the British cinema, but in the moments that are neither dull nor melodramatic it manages to be quite entertaining. Most of the cast give lively performances in spite of the prosaic direction and stilted, unnatural dialogue. Nora Swinburne and Guy Middleton act with poise and great sense of humour as the schoolteacher and the benighted knight."

Kine Weekly wrote: "Rambling and witless comedy drama, The 'mixed grill,' served from a marriage bureau, not only contains indifferent ingredients, but is poorly acted and clumsily directed."

Picture Show wrote: "Brightly acted, romantic drama with some amusing touches, this is the story of a couple of elderly spinsters who run a marriage burea and the adventures of four couples brought together by it. David Tomlinson is agreeable as the reporter who goes to the bureau after a story and ends up with a wife, and the galaxy of stars and starlets who appear in leading roles in the four 'romance-lettes' are well up to standard."

Bosley Crowther in The New York Times found the first third of the film "a delight to watch," but, despite convincing dialogue and an "excellent cast", "the film as a whole is a disappointingly contrived package job". Crowther thought that the best story, with Guy Middleton, "rates inclusion in one of the Somerset Maugham showcases", but he concluded that the writers "have blunted their ingenious stories with some melodramatic and whimsical resolutions. Terrence Fisher's direction is strictly assembly-line."
