= Susan Shaw =

English actress (1929–1978)

- Born: Patricia Gwendoline Sloots; 29 August 1929; West Norwood, London, England
- Died: 27 November 1978 (aged 49); Middlesex, England
- Occupation: Actress
- Years active: 1946–1963
- Spouses: Albert Lieven (m. 1949; div. 1953) Bonar Colleano (m. 1954; died 1958) Ronald Rowson (m. 1959; div. 1960)
- Children: 2

Susan Shaw (29 August 1929 – 27 November 1978; born Patricia Gwendoline Sloots) was an English actress.

== Early life ==
Shaw was born Patricia Gwendoline Sloots, on 29 August 1929 in West Norwood, London, to Edward John Sloots and Lillian Rose Lewis. She had wanted to become a dress designer but was working as a typist at the Ministry of Information when she did a screen test for the Rank Organisation. She was signed to a term contract and trained at the organisation's 'charm school'.

== Career ==
Shaw had a small part in the musical London Town (1946) and a larger one in another musical, Walking on Air (1946). She also had small roles in The Upturned Glass (1947) and Jassy (1947), and was then in Holiday Camp (1947), which introduced the Huggett family, although at this stage she wasn't a family member. Her most noticeable role to date came in It Always Rains on Sunday (1947) for Ealing Studios, after which she had another support part in My Brother's Keeper (1948) for Gainsborough Pictures, then replaced Patricia Roc when Roc pulled out of London Belongs to Me (1948).

Shaw's first lead came in To the Public Danger (1948), a short feature directed by Terence Fisher. She had a role in one of the segments of Quartet (1948) and, when Sydney Box decided to make a film series out of the Huggett family with Jack Warner in the lead, Shaw was cast as Susan Huggett. There were three films in the series: Here Come the Huggetts (1948), Vote for Huggett (1948) and The Huggetts Abroad (1949). Also at this time, she was the female lead in the comedies It's Not Cricket (1949) and Marry Me (1949), and one of many actresses in Train of Events (1949).

Shaw was by now one of the busiest young actresses in Britain. She played support in some thrillers – Waterfront (1950), The Woman in Question (1950) – before returning to leads in Pool of London (1951), with her future husband Bonar Colleano. In April 1951, she was listed as one of Britain's most popular actresses in a poll of 2,000 Daily Mail readers.

Shaw began to appear on television in One Man's Family (1951) and in a BBC version of The Amazing Dr. Clitterhouse (1951). She was the female lead in some B movies, too: There Is Another Sun (1951), Wide Boy (1952), A Killer Walks (1952), The Large Rope (1953), and Small Town Story (1953). She supported in some A films, such as The Intruder (1953), The Good Die Young (1954) and Time is My Enemy (1954), and played leads in Stolen Time (1955); Stock Car (1955), Fire Maidens from Outer Space (1956), Davy (1958), The Diplomatic Corpse (1958) and Chain of Events (1958), as well as in the TV play You Can't Have Everything (1958). She also appeared in Carry on Nurse (1959) and The Big Day (1960), and in episodes of All Aboard (1959), Suspense (1960), Richard the Lionheart (1962) and No Hiding Place (1962).

Her theatre credits included the title role in Peter Pan (1951), appearing with Bonar Colleano in a stage version of The Blue Lamp (1952), starring in The MacRoary Whirl, which ran in the West End for only three nights (1953), and touring as Mrs de Winter in a stage adaptation of Rebecca (1961). Her last films were Stranglehold (1963) and The Switch (1963).

== Critical assessment ==
The film historians Steve Chibnall and Brian McFarlane praised the "sulky, spiky tenacity that differentiated her from many of her contemporaries".

== Personal life ==
Her marriage to Albert Lieven, with whom she had a daughter, Anna, ended in divorce in 1953, and in 1954 she married Bonar Colleano, with whom she had a son, Mark, in 1955. In May 1958, Colleano admitted he had liabilities of nearly £10,000 due to extravagant living, and on 17 August the same year, he was killed in a traffic collision. Badly affected by Colleano's death, Shaw began to drink heavily. Unable to care for her son because of her emerging alcoholism, she gave him to his paternal grandmother to raise.

In November 1959, Shaw married TV producer Ronald Rowson. The marriage ended officially in November 1960, Rowson claiming that Shaw had been unfaithful to him with writer Stanley Mann, less than two months into their marriage.

== Later life and death ==
Shaw wound up living alone and broke in Soho. She died in Middlesex on 27 November 1978, of cirrhosis of the liver, and was cremated at Golders Green Crematorium, north London.

Her old friends intended to pay for the funeral but the Rank Organisation stepped in to do so. "When we heard of the circumstances of her death we felt it was the least we could do," said a Rank spokesman. Charlie Stevenson, landlord of the Swiss Tavern in Old Compton Street, said, "She came in here every day. They say she died of cirrhosis of the liver and she lived next door to prostitutes in Soho. But this is Soho. We all live next door to prostitutes. We loved her and we weren't going to see her buried in a pauper's grave. Now we shall give the money to medical charities."

== Filmography ==
Year	Title	Role	Notes
1946	London Town	Extra	Uncredited
1946	Walking on Air		
1947	The Upturned Glass	2nd Girl Student	
1947	Holiday Camp	Patsy Crawford	
1947	Jassy	Cecily	Uncredited
1947	It Always Rains on Sunday	Vi Sandigate	
1948	My Brother's Keeper	Beryl	
1948	London Belongs to Me	Doris Josser	
1948	To the Public Danger	Nancy Bedford	Short
1948	Quartet	Betty Baker	(segment "The Kite")
1948	Here Come the Huggetts	Susan Huggett	
1949	Vote for Huggett	Susan Huggett	
1949	It's Not Cricket	Primrose Brown	
1949	The Huggetts Abroad	Susan Huggett	
1949	Marry Me!	Pat Cooper	
1949	Train of Events	Doris Hardcastle	(segment "The Engine Driver")
1950	Waterfront	Connie McCabe	
1950	The Woman in Question	Catherine Taylor	
1951	Pool of London	Pat	
1951	There Is Another Sun	Lillian	
1952	Wide Boy	Molly	
1953	The Intruder	Tina	
1953	The Large Rope	Susan Hamble	
1953	Small Town Story	Patricia Lane	
1954	The Good Die Young	Doris	
1954	Time Is My Enemy	Evelyn Gower	
1955	Stolen Time	Carole Carlton	
1955	Stock Car	Gina	
1956	Fire Maidens from Outer Space	Hestia	
1958	Davy	Gwen	
1958	The Diplomatic Corpse	Jenny Drew	
1958	Chain of Events	Jill Mason	
1959	Carry On Nurse	Mrs Jane Bishop	
1960	The Big Day	Phyllis Selkirk	
1963	Stranglehold	Actress	
1963	The Switch	Search officer	(final film role)
