= William Fairchild =

English film director, screenwriter and playwright (1918–2000)

William Fairchild (sometimes credited as W. E. C. Fairchild) (January 6, 1918 – May 9, 2000) was an English author, playwright, director and screenwriter. He was married to actress Isabel Dean from 1953 to the early 1970s, and to producer, agent, and writer Robin Dalton from 1992 until his death.

== Selected filmography ==
- A Song for Tomorrow (1948) – story, script
- Penny and the Pownall Case (1948) – story, script
- Colonel Bogey (1948) – script
- Badger's Green (1949) – script
- Morning Departure (1950) – script
- The Long Dark Hall (1951) – additional dialogue
- Outcast of the Islands (1951) – script
- The Man with the Gun (1952) – script
- Gift Horse (1952) – script
- The Net (1953) – script
- Malta Story (1953) – script
- Front Page Story (1954) – script
- The Seekers (1954) – script
- Passage Home (1955) – script
- John and Julie (1955) – script, original play, director
- Value for Money (1955) – script
- No Man's Land (1956) (TV) – script, original play
- The Extra Day (1956) – script, director
- The Silent Enemy (1958) – script, director
- The Four Just Men (1959–60) (TV series) – script, director
- The Horsemasters (1961) – script, director
- 199 Park Lane (1965) (TV series) – script, creator
- Do Not Disturb (1965) – original play
- Star! (1968) – script
- The Last Shot You Hear (1969) – original play
- Embassy (1972) – script
- The Darwin Adventure (1972) – script
- The MacKintosh Man (1973) – uncredited writer
- The Sound of Murder (1982) – script, original play
- Invitation to the Wedding (1985) – script
