= Sydney Bromley =

English actor (1909–1987)

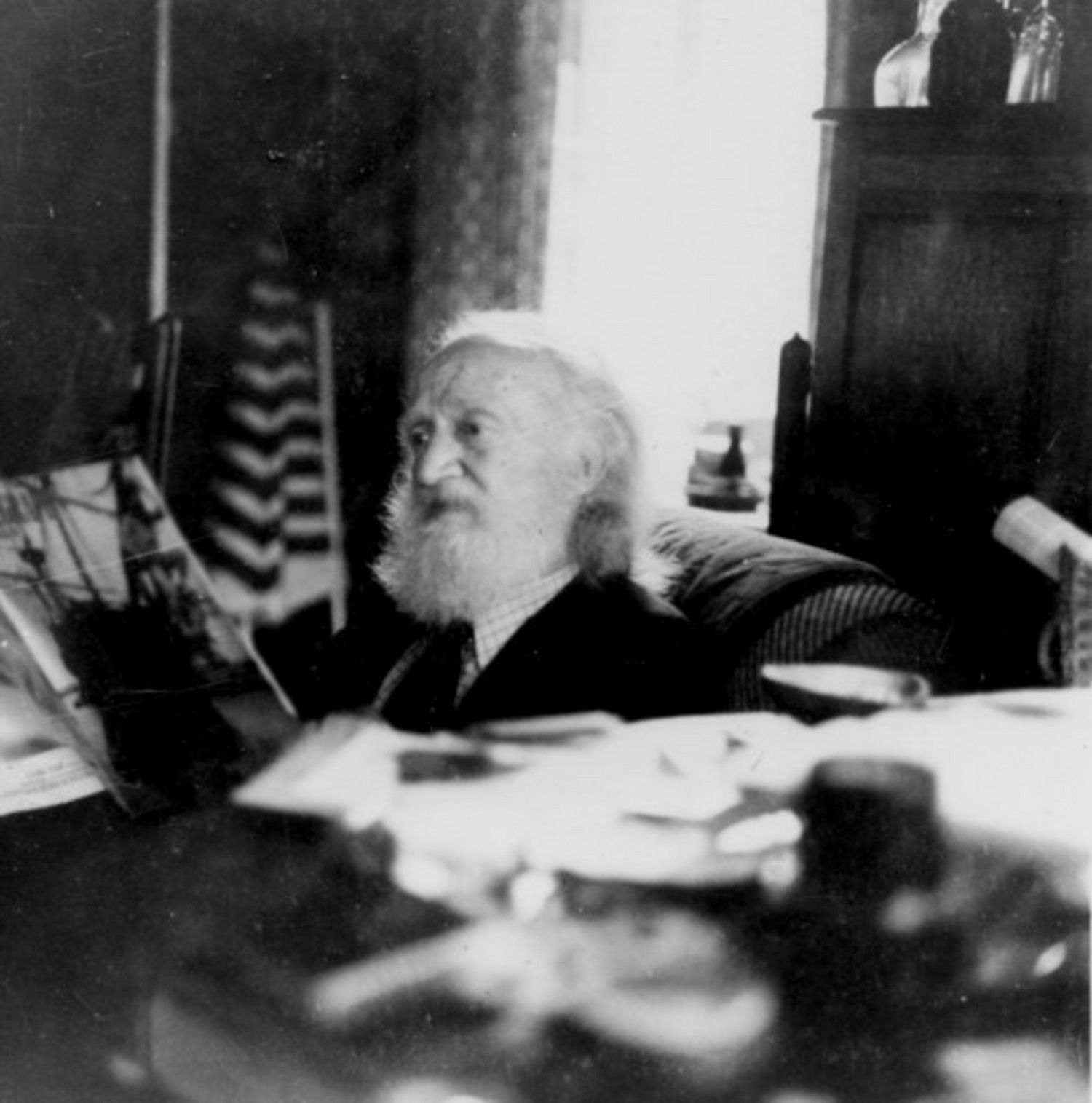
- at his home in Woldingham, Surrey, UK
- Born: Sidney Charles Bromley; 24 July 1909; London, England
- Died: 14 August 1987 (aged 78); Worthing, Sussex, England
- Years active: 1945–1987

Sidney Charles Bromley (24 July 1909 – 14 August 1987), credited as Sydney Bromley, was an English character actor. He appeared in more than sixty films and television programmes. On stage, he appeared in the 1924 premiere of Saint Joan, by George Bernard Shaw, as well as the 1957 film of the same name. He appeared in A Midsummer Night's Dream and Twelfth Night during the summer of 1935 at the Open Air Theatre in London.

Bromley was diagnosed with terminal cancer in July 1986 and died from the illness on 14 August 1987, aged 78.

== Partial filmography ==
- Demobbed (1944) – Announcer (uncredited)
- Brief Encounter (1945) – Johnnie – Second Soldier (uncredited)
- Loyal Heart (1946) – Burton June (uncredited)
- The Mark of Cain (1947) – Martin (Richard's Man) (uncredited)
- To the Public Danger (1948)
- The Dark Road (1948)
- A Date with a Dream (1948) – Stranger in Max's office
- Badger's Green (1949) – Alf, the Ragholt scorer
- Devil's Point (1954) – Enson
- The Love Match (1955) – (uncredited)
- Stolen Time (1955)
- Saint Joan (1957) – Baudricourt's Steward
- Horrors of the Black Museum (1959) – Neighbour
- Captain Clegg (1962) – Old Tom Ketch
- The Piper's Tune (1962) – Shepherd
- Paranoaic (1963) – Tramp (uncredited)
- Father Came Too! (1964) – Lang
- Die, Monster, Die! (1965) – Pierce
- Carry On Cowboy (1965) – Sam Houston
- The Christmas Tree (1966) – Motorist (uncredited)
- Operation Third Form (1966) – Paddy
- Prehistoric Women (1967) – Ullo
- Night of the Big Heat (1967) – Old Tramp
- The Fearless Vampire Killers (1967) – Sleigh Driver
- Smashing Time (1967) – Tramp
- Half a Sixpence (1967) – Pub Character
- Macbeth (1971) – Porter
- No Sex Please, We're British (1973) – Rag & Bone Man
- Frankenstein and the Monster from Hell (1974) – Muller
- Professor Popper's Problem (1974) – Crickle
- Robin Hood Junior (1975) – Alfric
- Jabberwocky (1977) – Dubbing (voice)
- Crossed Swords (1977) – Peasant
- Candleshoe (1977) – Mr. Thresher
- Dangerous Davies: The Last Detective (1981) – Harkness
- Dragonslayer (1981) – Hodge
- An American Werewolf in London (1981) – Alf
- The NeverEnding Story (1984) – Engywook
- Pirates (1986) – Diddler
- Anastasia: The Mystery of Anna (1986) – Herbert
- Crystalstone (1987) – Old Man (final film role)
