= Stock Car (film) =

1955 British film by Wolf Rilla

- Original pressbook cover
- Directed by: Wolf Rilla
- Written by: A.R. Rawlinson
- Story by: A.R. Rawlinson & Victor Lyndon
- Produced by: A.R. Rawlinson
- Starring: Paul Carpenter; Rona Anderson; Susan Shaw
- Cinematography: Geoffrey Faithfull
- Edited by: Joseph Sterling
- Music by: Wilfred Burns
- Production company: Balblair Productions
- Distributed by: Butcher's Film Service (UK)
- Release date: 1955; (UK)
- Running time: 68 min
- Country: United Kingdom
- Language: English

Stock Car is a 1955 British second feature crime drama film directed by Wolf Rilla and starring Paul Carpenter, Rona Anderson, and Susan Shaw. It was written by A.R. Rawlinson.

== Plot ==
When her father dies during a stock car race, Katie Glebe takes over the running of his garage, helped by American driver Larry Duke. Katie struggles to fend off creditors, including the unscrupulous Turk McNeil, who seeks to repossess her property. Further dramas ensue when Turk's girlfriend Gina shows an interest in Larry.

== Cast ==
- Paul Carpenter as Larry Duke
- Rona Anderson as Katie Glebe
- Susan Shaw as Gina
- Harry Fowler as Monty Albright
- Robert Rietty as Roberto
- Paul Whitsun-Jones as Turk McNeil
- Sabrina as Trixie
- Alma Taylor as Nurse Sprott
- Patrick Jordan as Jack
- Lorrae Desmond as singer
- Frank Thornton as doctor

== Critical reception ==
Monthly Film Bulletin said "The film would have been greatly improved had there been more emphasis on the actual stock car racing, for the brief racing sequences are by far the most satisfactory. The rest is modestly agreeable, but marred by some very overworked humour on the subjects of wide boys and the differences between the English and American languages."

Kine Weekly said "Meaty romantic melodrama, planted in seamy, yet colorful, stock car racing circles. ... The picture leaves nothing to chance nor, for that matter, the imagination, but its clichés, borrowed from the turf, are nevertheless skilfully handled and realistically embroidered. Paul Carpenter convinces as the Yankee hero, Larry, Rona Anderson is a refreshing Katie, Susan Shaw scores in contrast as temptress Gina, and Sabrina, who, by the way, should be seen and not heard, enhances its by no means inconsiderable sex angle in a minor role. The supporting players are sound, too. The night club, hospital and office interiors closely fit the action, and the climax is hearty. A workmanlike job."

The Radio Times noted, "The mediocrity is unrelenting, with the race sequences every bit as hackneyed as the risible melodrama, although Susan Shaw briefly brightens things up as a shameless floozy."

The Spinning Image wrote: "the lower half of a double bill from British B-movie specialists Butchers, here in their element with a thriller that never did anything particularly spectacular, but provided enough thrills and spills to keep the audience in their seats for the duration, though being well aware that a more expensive and starry movie was following on must have helped in that department."
