= The Fear (The Twilight Zone) =

- The Twilight Zone episode
- Episode no.: Season 5 Episode 35
- Directed by: Ted Post
- Written by: Rod Serling
- Production code: 2633
- Original air date: May 29, 1964

Guest appearances
- Peter Mark Richman (as "Mark Richman"): Trooper Robert Franklin; Hazel Court: Charlotte Scott

Episode chronology
← Previous "Come Wander with Me"	Next → "The Bewitchin' Pool"
- The Twilight Zone (1959 TV series) (season 5)

"The Fear" is the penultimate episode of the American television series The Twilight Zone. It is the last episode written by series creator/host Rod Serling.

== Opening narration ==
The major ingredient of any recipe for fear is the unknown. And here are two characters about to partake of the meal: Miss Charlotte Scott, a fashion editor, and Mr. Robert Franklin, a state trooper. And the third member of the party: the unknown, that has just landed a few hundred yards away. This person or thing is soon to be met. This is a mountain cabin, but it is also a clearing in the shadows known as the Twilight Zone.

== Plot ==
Highway Patrol trooper Robert Franklin is dispatched to the remote mountain cabin of brooding New York City fashion magazine editor Charlotte Scott (recuperating from a nervous breakdown), as unexplained occurrences indicate the presence of a mysterious force. Bright flashes of light are seen, strange craters appear, and the trooper's car is turned on its side, breaking the radio. Back inside, they find the phone dead. Charlotte hears strange noises on the roof; when Robert goes outside to investigate, he finds that his car is back in place—covered in gigantic fingerprints.

The two sleep nervously, and go out into the woods the next morning, seeking the giant monster. They find an enormous footprint, leading the socialite to run away, although the nearest village is 30 miles away. She soon stumbles and falls directly into the path of a 500-foot-tall alien with one eye. Realizing that no one will believe their story, the pair are left to stand against the beast. The alien doesn't attack or move, so Robert approaches and shoots it...and it deflates, revealing itself to be an enormous balloon. The true source of the problem is a small alien spacecraft, containing two aliens no bigger than a man's thumb. They reveal that all of their trickery has been foiled by "Earth men's failure to be frightened", beg their superiors to allow them to depart (or, in their eyes, face being crushed), and finally flee. Robert grins and wishes them luck: "Maybe the next place they land, they can be the giants." Charlotte asks what will happen if future invaders are giants; Robert informs her that "I think you'd spit in their eye." She smiles and the camera tilts to the skyline as Serling's voiceover begins.

== Closing narration ==
Fear, of course, is extremely relative. It depends on who can look down and who must look up. It depends on other vagaries, like the time, the mood, the darkness. But it's been said before, with great validity, that the worst thing there is to fear is fear itself. Tonight's tale of terror and tiny people on the Twilight Zone.
