= Highbury Studios =

Film studios located in London

General information
- Type: Film studios
- Location: Melody Lane, Highbury, London, United Kingdom
- Coordinates: 51.552°N 0.097°W
- Inaugurated: 1933
- Demolished: 1961
- Owner: Maurice J. Wilson (1937-1945); Rank Organisation (1945-1948); Norman Collins (1950-1955); Associated Broadcasting Company (1955-1961)

Height
- Height: Stage 1: 35 ft Stage 2: 18 ft

Technical details
- Floor area: Stage 1: 6600 ft Stage 2: 1800 ft

Highbury Studios was a British film studio located in Highbury, North London which operated from 1937 until 1956. The studio was constructed by the producer Maurice J. Wilson. During its early years, the studio was hired out to independent production companies.

== Credits ==
- Mrs Pym of Scotland Yard

== Highbury Productions ==
Following the Second World War, Highbury Studios was acquired by the Rank Organisation which used it to make low-budget second features featuring the company's rising actors. The studio was run by the producer John Croydon, who had previously worked at Ealing. Its aim was to make 50 minute "curtain raisers" for Rank's features. John Croydon was head of production. It frequently used members of Rank's Company of Youth.

In December 1948 the studio operation was shut down as part of a series of cuts made throughout the Rank Organisation, which had suffered heavy financial losses.

=== Select credits ===
- A Song for Tomorrow (1948) – directed by Terence Fisher
- Trouble in the Air (1948)
- Penny and the Pownall Case (1948) – with Diana Dors, Christopher Lee
- Colonel Bogey (1948) – directed by Terence Fisher
- To the Public Danger (1948) – directed by Fisher, with Dermot Walsh and Susan Shaw
- Fly Away Peter (1948)
- Love in Waiting (1948) – with David Tomlinson
- A Piece of Cake (1948)
- Badger's Green (1949)
- Stop the Merry-Go-Round (1952)

== Later use ==
Occasional films were still made there by other companies, and it became increasingly used as a television studio. It made a number of commercials.

== Bibliography ==
- Macnab, Geoffrey. J. Arthur Rank and the British Film Industry. Routledge, 1994.
- Warren, Patricia. British Film Studios: An Illustrated History. Batsford, 2001.
