= John Croydon =

British film producer and production manager (1907–1994)

- Born: 3 November 1907; Middlesex, United Kingdom
- Died: February 1994 (aged 86); Haywards Heath, West Sussex
- Occupation: Producer
- Years active: 1933–1966 (film)

John Croydon (3 November 1907 – February 1994) was a British film producer and production manager.

He was employed at Ealing Studios for a number of years during the Michael Balcon era. He then moved to Highbury Studios in the late 1940s to head up production of second features for the Rank Organisation, and later turned to independent production once Highbury had been closed.

== Selected filmography ==
- Champagne Charlie (1944)
- Dead of Night (1945)
- Nicholas Nickleby (1947)
- Colonel Bogey (1948)
- Love in Waiting (1948)
- A Piece of Cake (1948)
- Penny and the Pownall Case (1948)
- To the Public Danger (1948)
- Badger's Green (1949)
- Stop Press Girl (1949)
- White Corridors (1951)
- One Wild Oat (1951)
- Operation Malaya (1953)
- Delavine Affair (1954)
- Tarzan and the Lost Safari (1957)
- The Haunted Strangler (1958)
- Corridors of Blood (1958)
- First Man into Space (1959)
- A High Wind in Jamaica (1965)
- The Projected Man (1966)

== Bibliography ==
- Chibnall, Steve & McFarlane, Brian. The British 'B' Film. Palgrave MacMillan, 2009.
