= To the Public Danger =

1948 short film directed by Terence Fisher

- Opening titles
- Directed by: Terence Fisher
- Written by: T.J. Morrison; Arthur Reid
- Based on: radio play by Patrick Hamilton
- Produced by: John Croydon
- Starring: Dermot Walsh; Susan Shaw; Barry Letts; Roy Plomley
- Cinematography: Roy Fogwell; Harry Waxman
- Edited by: Graeme Hamilton
- Music by: Doreen Carwithen
- Production company: Highbury Productions
- Distributed by: General Film Distributors
- Release date: September 1948
- Running time: 43 minutes
- Country: United Kingdom
- Language: English

To the Public Danger is a 1948 British short entertainment/public-information film directed by Terence Fisher and starring Dermot Walsh, Susan Shaw, Barry Letts, and Roy Plomley. The screenplay, written by T.J. Morrison and Arthur Reid, was based on a 1939 BBC radio play by Patrick Hamilton

The film was produced by John Croydon at Highbury Studios as a second feature ('B') for release by the Rank Organisation, with sets designed by Don Russell.

== Synopsis ==
While having a quiet drink together in a road house, young working-class couple Fred and Nancy fall into the company of two raffish motorists: the self-confident Captain Cole and his drunken pal Reggie. Cole takes a shine to Nancy. After a game of billiards and a number of drinks, Cole takes them out driving. While speeding along in the dark, with Nancy holding the steering wheel while Cole lights a cigarette, they hit what they think to be a man on a bicycle.

Although Fred wants to stop, Cole insists on driving on. Nancy takes Cole's side and begins taunting Fred, who eventually manages to escape and raise the alarm. A police investigation reveals that nobody had been injured in the collision with the bike, which had belonged to a poacher who didn't report the accident. In the meantime, Cole, Nancy and Reggie have suffered a crash of their own while drunken speeding, killing all three of them.

== Cast ==
- Dermot Walsh as Captain Cole
- Susan Shaw as Nancy Bedford
- Barry Letts as Fred Lane
- Roy Plomley as Reggie
- Betty Ann Davies as barmaid
- Sydney Bromley as bar patron
- John Lorrell as police sergeant
- Sam Kydd as police driver (billed as Sam Kidd)
- Patricia Hayes as postmistress
- Frederick Piper as labourer
- Patience Rentoul as labourer's wife
- Cliff Weir as pub landlord
- Arthur Mullard as man standing near bar
- Barbara Murray as bit role
- Philip Saville as man in pub watching billiards game
- Constance Smith as girl in pub watching billiards game

== Radio play ==
The film was based on a 1939 radio play by Patrick Hamilton, who had been encouraged to write the story as part of a government road safety campaign. Hamilton had himself been knocked down by a drunk driver. The story was updated slightly, and represents the post-war malaise with the use of noirish sequences. In his biography of Hamilton, his brother wrote the "reception was wonderful" and he received "huge fan mail" and "a number of abusive letters" due to its subject matter. The play's producer Val Gielgud called it "one of the very best of radio plays".

== Critical reception ==
The Monthly Film Bulletin wrote: "This is a story with a twist to it which points a sad moral, but which as a film has little to distinguish it."

The Daily Film Renter wrote: "With realistic performances by Dermot Walsh, Susan Shaw, Barry Letts and Roy Plomley, and several small studies, notably by Betty Ann Davies, Frederick Piper, and Sidney Bromley, this is a good example of the entertainment-propaganda film. The moral is firmly registered at the end, but is not allowed to take away from the general impact of the story."

Kine Weekly wrote: "Grisly and ironic curtain raiser. Designed to keep death off the road and as a warning to working-class couples not to speak to strangers, it starts with four main characters and ends up with one. ... Dermot Walsh thoroughly suggests a nasty piece of work as Cole, and Susan Shaw and Barry Letts are adequate as Nancy and Fred, but Roy Plomley's alcoholic humour is hard to take as Reggie."
