= Stranglehold (1963 film) =

British drama by Lawrence Huntington

- Lobby card
- Directed by: Lawrence Huntington
- Written by: Guy Elmes; Joy Garrison
- Produced by: David Henley; Jack O. Lamont
- Starring: Macdonald Carey; Barbara Shelley; Philip Friend
- Cinematography: S.D. Onions
- Edited by: Peter Weatherley
- Music by: Eric Spear
- Production company: Argo Film Productions
- Distributed by: Rank Film Distributors
- Release date: 24 February 1963
- Running time: 73 minutes
- Country: United Kingdom
- Language: English

Stranglehold is a 1963 British second feature drama film directed by Lawrence Huntington and starring Macdonald Carey, Barbara Shelley and Philip Friend. It was written by Guy Elmes and Joy Garrison.

== Plot ==
American actor Bill Morrison is a veteran portrayer of gangsters, so much so that he is losing his identity, and is estranged from his wife and son. In London to make a film he meets young foreign actress Lilli. When Morrison awakens after a night of heavy drinking with Lilli, he finds her dead, and thinks he has murdered her. He engages a criminal known as The Dutchman to dispose of the body. When the attempt fails, Morrison confesses his presumed guilt to the police. The autposy subsequently reveals that Lilli died from a self-inflicted overdose of sleeping tablets, and Morrison is reconciled with his family.

== Cast ==
- Macdonald Carey as Bill Morrison
- Barbara Shelley as Chris Morrison
- Philip Friend as Steffan
- Nadja Regin as Lilli
- Leonard Sachs as the Dutchman
- Mark Loerering as Jimmy Morrison
- Susan Shaw as actress
- Josephine Brown as Grace

== Production ==
The film was distributed by the Rank Organisation. It was shot at Pinewood Studios. The film's sets were designed by the art director Duncan Sutherland.

== Critical reception ==
The Monthly Film Bulletin wrote: "This unlikely affair is so unconvincing in its succession of coincidences and improbabilities that it becomes almost disarming. The dialogue, though, is rather worse than the plot, and liberally sprinkled with Americanisms which are partly excused by the fact that the hero is an American actor – who seems to make all his films in this country."

Kine Weekly wrote: "The tale stretches credulity to near breaking point, yet despite the predictable twist denouement isn't bad theatre. Competently acted and realistically staged, it'll register on the lower half of most double bills. ... The picture has a novel central idea, but its promising fundamentals are slightly dissipated towards the finish when the script sharply descends to 'penny blood' level. Macdonald Carey, the American star, makes the most of a ticklish chore as Bill, Nadja Regin wins a little sympathy in the small role of Lilli, and Mark Loegering is quite natural as Jimmy. The rest, too, eagerly seize their chances. The domestic sentiment is carefully handled and authentic studio settings help to offset the confected though traditional, ending."
