= The Diplomatic Corpse (film) =

1958 British film by Montgomery Tully

- Directed by: Montgomery Tully
- Written by: Maurice Harrison; Sidney Nelson
- Produced by: Francis Searle
- Starring: Robin Bailey; Susan Shaw; Liam Redmond
- Cinematography: Phil Grindrod
- Edited by: Jim Connock
- Production company: ACT Films
- Distributed by: Rank Film Distributors (UK)
- Release date: March 17, 1958 (UK)
- Running time: 65 minutes
- Country: United Kingdom
- Language: English

The Diplomatic Corpse is a 1958 British second feature comedy thriller film directed by Montgomery Tully and starring Robin Bailey, Susan Shaw and Liam Redmond. It was written by Maurice Harrison and Sidney Nelson and produced by ACT Films.

== Plot ==
A crime reporter, assisted by his girlfriend, a fashion reporter at the same newspaper, investigates a dead body taken out of the River Thames. They are soon able to link it with a foreign embassy, making it a sensitive diplomatic matter.

== Cast ==
- Robin Bailey as Mike Billings
- Susan Shaw as Jenny Drew
- Liam Redmond as Inspector Corcoran
- Harry Fowler as Knocker Parsons
- André Mikhelson as Hamid
- Bill Shine as Humphrey Garrad
- Charles Farrell as Percy Simpson
- Maya Koumani as Marian Koumaya
- Nicholas Bruce as Karim
- Peter Bathurst as Cartwright
- John Briggs as Johnny, copy boy
- Frank Hawkins as Police Sergeant
- George Street as Station Police Sergeant

== Production ==
Producer Francis Searle recalled the film "was a near-disaster. We had cast Ursula Howells; then, at the very last moment, she was taken sick and couldn't appear. I then had to find another artiste quickly. We finished up with Susan Shaw and she was all right."

The film's sets were designed by the art director Joseph Bato.

== Critical reception ==
Monthly Film Bulletin said "Though mainly naive and sterotyped hokum, lively presentation makes this an entertaining second feature. The 'foreign' voice of Maya Koumani is rather fetching and other less exotic players spirited enough in their way."

Chibnall and McFarlane in The British 'B' Film wrote: "`a pair of sparring reporters (Robin Bailey and Susan Shaw) is meant to be striking sparks of sexual interest, but Bailey in particular is quite lost in this sort of role. ... the characters are thinly written – apart from the uninspiring romantic duo."

In British Sound Films: The Studio Years 1928–1959 David Quinlan rated the film as "average", writing: "Thriller with a sense of humour."
