= Kent Walton =

British TV sports commentator and presenter (1917–2003)

Kent Walton (22 August 1917 – 24 August 2003), born Kenneth Walton Beckett, was a British television sports commentator, presenter and actor. He was the predominant commentator on ITV's coverage of British professional wrestling from 1955 to 1988.

== Early life ==
Despite a transatlantic accent which led many to believe he was Canadian, he was born in Cairo, Egypt, the son of the finance minister in the colonial government, and he grew up at Haslemere in Surrey. He was educated at Charterhouse.

He attended the Embassy School of Acting in London and appeared in rep. On the outbreak of World War II in 1939, he joined the Royal Air Force, serving in Bomber Command as a radio operator and front gunner. He acquired his accent mixing with Canadian airmen.

== Sports commentator ==
After the end of the war he returned to acting before commentating on tennis and football. He made his television wrestling commentary debut on the ITV network in November 1955, a job he kept for 33 years. At its peak in the 1970s, ITV's wrestling coverage, on World of Sport, could command up to 12 million between the football half-time and full-time results (4–4.40 pm) on Saturdays. Although fans of ITV's wrestling coverage reportedly included the Queen, the Duke of Edinburgh, the Queen Mother and Margaret Thatcher, enthusiasm was not shared by ITV's Head of Sport, Greg Dyke, and in 1988 he dropped the sport, a setback from which the traditional British style of the sport, although it has survived to the present, has never fully recovered. Walton returned to the commentary position one last time in October 1990 for a brief revival of British wrestling on ITV, transmitted only in the Grampian and STV regions (and later by Granada in a graveyard slot in early 1991).

== Presenter ==
Walton was a disc jockey on Radio Luxembourg, and for a time presented several tv music shows:- Honey Hit Parade, and then Cool for Cats from 1956 to 1961, then Discs A Gogo for TWW Television from 1961 to 1965. In the early 1960s, he also acted as a judge on Thank Your Lucky Stars on ITV.

== Producer ==
In the early 1970s, he was involved with British sexploitation movies and is credited as a producer of such films as Clinic Exclusive, aka Clinic Xclusive, aka With These Hands (1971). A co-founder of Pyramid Films, he jointly used a pseudonym, Elton Hawke, with his business partner Hazel Adair, the co creator of the soap opera Crossroads. Walton used other pseudonyms to keep this part of his life from gaining public attention, but it was revealed in a 1975 episode of the TV documentary series Man Alive.

== Personal life and death ==
Walton married Lynn Smith, the first wife of Leslie Grade in 1949; the couple had a son. He also had a stepson Michael (now Lord Grade) through his wife's first marriage.

Walton died two days after his 86th birthday in 2003 after battling cancer

== Awards and accomplishments ==
- Wrestling Observer Newsletter

- Wrestling Observer Newsletter Hall of Fame (Class of 2011)
