= Stolen Time =

- Directed by: Charles Deane
- Written by: Charles Deane
- Produced by: Charles Deane
- Starring: Richard Arlen; Susan Shaw; Vincent Ball
- Cinematography: Geoffrey Faithfull
- Edited by: Adam Dawson
- Production company: Charles Deane Productions
- Distributed by: British Lion Films; Allied Artists (US)
- Release date: October 1955
- Running time: 69 minutes
- Country: United Kingdom
- Language: English

Stolen Time (U.S. title Blonde Blackmailer) is a 1955 British second feature ('B') crime drama film directed and written by Charles Deane and starring Richard Arlen, Susan Shaw and Vincent Ball.

== Plot ==
After serving seven years in jail for a murder he didn't commit, Tony Pelassier, helped by his girlfriend Marie, seeks to find out who was really responsible. A clue leads them via a blind pickpocket to model Carole Carlton, who is murdered before they can talk to her. Eventually Pelassier finds the killer, who confesses to both murders. The police, who have been trailing Pelassier, overhear the confession.

== Cast ==
- Richard Arlen as Tony Pelassier
- Susan Shaw as Carole Carlton
- Constance Leigh as Marie
- Vincent Ball as Johnson
- Andreas Malandrinos as Papa Pelassier
- Alathea Siddons as Mama Pelassier
- Arnold Adrian
- Sydney Bromley
- Claudia Carr
- John Dunbar
- Reginald Hearne as Inspector Martin
- Howard Lang as Scotland Yard detective
- Patricia Salonika
- Clive St. George

== Reception ==
The Monthly Film Bulletin wrote: "Sub-standard melodrama. The plot is stercotyped and uneventfully worked out, with a climax no more than lukewarm, and while the players are afforded no great opportunities, the acting is generally inexpert. The best feature is the restrained use of background music, which mercifully does not continually underline the action."

Kine Weekly wrote: "Shoddy and untidy crime pot-boiler. ... Richard Arlen makes the best of a tough assignment as the hero, but fails to achieve the impossible and bring conviction to the story. Too transparent to thrill and cheaply staged, it hasn't much to recommend it apart from its handy footage and quota ticket. Second-rate British support. ... It has neither style nor punch and, despite the sound acting of Richard Arlen, who crossed the Atlantic to play the role of Tony, telegraphs its twist ending. Constance Leigh pleases as Marie, but the rest ham. The dialogue is cliché-ridden, and the settings and photography drab."

In British Sound Films: The Studio Years 1928–1959 David Quinlan rated the film as "mediocre", writing: "Draggy drama, performed without enthusiasm."
