= Eric Spear =

English composer (1908–1966)

- Born: 18 April 1908; Croydon, England, United Kingdom
- Died: 3 November 1966 (aged 58) Southampton, England, United Kingdom
- Genres: Film and television themes
- Occupations: Composer, classical musician

Eric Spear (18 April 1908 – 3 November 1966) was an English composer best known for his film scores and the theme of the ITV soap opera Coronation Street.

== Early life and career ==
Spear was born in Croydon in 1908. He participated in the 1953 film Street of Shadows, and his theme for the 1954 movie Meet Mr. Callaghan was rendered as a best-selling record by Les Paul. He also wrote music and lyrics for the 1959 musical Kookaburra, which played at the Princes Theatre. Spear wrote the theme tune to Coronation Street in his Finchley home, where he lived until he moved away in 1959. For a short time in the 1960s, Spear lived in Guernsey.

== Coronation Street theme tune ==
In 1954, Spear was commissioned to write the theme tune to The Grove Family, a BBC series that ran for three years, which is generally regarded as the UK's first real soap opera. The series is now forgotten, but it led to another commission six years later by rival channel Granada Television. The theme, originally entitled "Lancashire Blues", was commissioned by Peter Taylor at De Wolfe Music for a new television soap opera called Florizel Street. Spear was paid £6 for the task (£136.54 in 2024). However, the name of the serial was changed to Coronation Street, because cast member William Roache (Ken Barlow) could not pronounce the title, and because it was felt that the name bore a resemblance to Zoflora, a popular floral concentrated disinfectant. Although originally scheduled to run for just six weeks, Coronation Street went on to become the world's longest-running television soap opera, and Roache as the longest-serving soap actor in the world.

The cornet player Ronnie Hunt (playing trumpet on the recording) found the recording session frustrating, as Spear insisted on many takes before obtaining the sound that he wanted. For most of the programme's run since 1960, the theme tune has only been modified by converting it to stereo. Since 31 May 2010, a new version has replaced the original arrangement, coinciding with the programme's shift to HDTV with new opening titles. The new version has been criticised by many viewers as lacking the atmospheric quality of the original. The commercial break 'motif' to the 'End of Part 1' card was also replaced by a newer, less substantial version. The new version of the theme also differs by being less strident than the original, with less of an orchestral sound, and having a shorter closing section, which is occasionally 'squashed' by the voice-over announcing the upcoming programme menu across ITV's channels.

Until ITV celebrated forty years of broadcasting (in 1995), the original recording of the theme had never been issued commercially. It was released as the b-side to a double A-side single, "Always Look on the Bright Side of Life" by the Coronation Street Cast, coupled with "Something Stupid" by Amanda Barrie and Johnny Briggs. The single reached the Top 40 in the UK Singles Chart, making number 35.

However, a faithful cover version by Geoff Love and his Orchestra was released as a single in April 1961, and reached No. 27 on the NME Singles Chart. A budget cover version by James Wright (a pseudonym for Gordon Franks) and his Orchestra was released on the Embassy label in April 1962, which was also included on a 1965 LP, Top TV Themes.

EMI's release of the original recording in 2005 includes the theme's solo trumpet introductory bar, which has never been heard on the serial.

== Personal life and death ==
Spear died in Southampton, Hampshire, on 3 November 1966. He was 58 years old.

== Selected filmography ==
- Play Up the Band (1935)
- Joy Ride (1935)
- Such Is Life (1936)
- The Improper Duchess (1936)
- King of the Castle (1936)
- No Way Back (1949)
- She Shall Have Murder (1950)
- Wide Boy (1952)
- Men Against the Sun (1952)
- Counterspy (1953)
- Street of Shadows (1953)
- Small Town Story (1953)
- Bang! You're Dead (1954)
- Meet Mr. Callaghan (1954)
- Stranger from Venus (1954)
- The Switch (1963)
- Stranglehold (1963)
- The Vulture (1967)
