= List of British films of 1954 =

A list of films produced in the United Kingdom in 1954 (see 1954 in film):

== 1954 ==
Title	Director	Cast	Genre	Notes
1954
Adventure in the Hopfields	John Guillermin	Mandy Miller, Hilda Fenemore, Russell Waters	Family	
The Angel Who Pawned Her Harp	Alan Bromly	Felix Aylmer, Diane Cilento, Jerry Desmonde	Comedy	
Animal Farm	John Halas, Joy Batchelor	Gordon Heath, Maurice Denham	Literary adaptation	Animated version of George Orwell's book
Aunt Clara	Anthony Kimmins	Margaret Rutherford, Ronald Shiner, Fay Compton	Comedy	
Bang! You're Dead	Lance Comfort	Jack Warner, Sean Barrett, Derek Farr	Thriller	
The Beachcomber	Muriel Box	Donald Sinden, Glynis Johns, Robert Newton	Comedy drama	
Beau Brummell	Curtis Bernhardt	Stewart Granger, Elizabeth Taylor, Peter Ustinov	Historical	
Beautiful Stranger	David Miller	Ginger Rogers, Herbert Lom, Stanley Baker	Mystery	
The Belles of St. Trinian's	Frank Launder	Alastair Sim, Joyce Grenfell, George Cole	Comedy	Number 94 in the list of BFI Top 100 British films
The Black Knight	Tay Garnett	Alan Ladd, Patricia Medina, Peter Cushing	Drama	
The Black Rider	Wolf Rilla	Jimmy Hanley, Rona Anderson, Leslie Dwyer	Thriller	
Burnt Evidence	Daniel Birt	Jane Hylton, Duncan Lamont, Donald Gray	Thriller	
Carrington V.C.	Anthony Asquith	David Niven, Margaret Leighton, Noelle Middleton	Drama	
Conflict of Wings	John Eldridge	John Gregson, Muriel Pavlow, Kieron Moore	Drama	
The Crowded Day	John Guillermin	John Gregson, Joan Rice, Cyril Raymond	Drama	
Dance Little Lady	Val Guest	Terence Morgan, Mai Zetterling, Guy Rolfe	Drama	
Dangerous Cargo	John Harlow	Jack Watling, Susan Stephen, Karel Stepanek	Crime	
Dangerous Voyage	Vernon Sewell	William Lundigan, Naomi Chance, Vincent Ball	Drama	
Delayed Action	John Harlow	Robert Ayres, June Thorburn, Alan Wheatley	Mystery	
Devil Girl from Mars	David MacDonald	Patricia Laffan, Hugh McDermott, Hazel Court	Sci-fi	
Devil on Horseback	Cyril Frankel	Googie Withers, John McCallum, Meredith Edwards	Drama	
Devil's Point	Montgomery Tully	Richard Arlen, Greta Gynt, Donald Houston	Crime	
The Diamond	Montgomery Tully	Dennis O'Keefe, Margaret Sheridan, Philip Friend	Crime	
Diplomatic Passport	Gene Martel	Marsha Hunt, Paul Carpenter, Honor Blackman	Thriller	
The Divided Heart	Charles Crichton	Cornell Borchers, Yvonne Mitchell, Armin Dahlen	Drama	
Doctor in the House	Ralph Thomas	Dirk Bogarde, Kenneth More, Donald Sinden	Comedy	
Don't Blame the Stork	Ákos Ráthonyi	Ian Hunter, Veronica Hurst, Brenda De Banzie	Comedy	
Double Exposure	John Gilling	John Bentley, Rona Anderson, Garry Marsh	Crime	
Duel in the Jungle	George Marshall	Dana Andrews, Jeanne Crain, David Farrar	Adventure/crime	
Eight O'Clock Walk	Lance Comfort	Richard Attenborough, Cathy O'Donnell, Derek Farr	Crime	
The Embezzler	John Gilling	Charles Victor, Zena Marshall, Cyril Chamberlain	Crime	
The End of the Road	Wolf Rilla	Finlay Currie, Duncan Lamont, Naomi Chance	Drama	
Face the Music	Terence Fisher	Alex Nicol, Eleanor Summerfield, Paul Carpenter	Crime	
Fast and Loose	Gordon Parry	Stanley Holloway, Kay Kendall, June Thorburn	Comedy	
Father Brown	Robert Hamer	Alec Guinness, Joan Greenwood, Peter Finch	Detective/drama	
Final Appointment	Terence Fisher	John Bentley, Eleanor Summerfield, Hubert Gregg	Drama	
Five Days	Montgomery Tully	Dane Clark, Paul Carpenter, Thea Gregory	Crime	
For Better, for Worse	J. Lee Thompson	Dirk Bogarde, Susan Stephen, Cecil Parker	Comedy/romance	
Forbidden Cargo	Harold French	Jack Warner, Nigel Patrick, Elizabeth Sellars, Terence Morgan	Crime/drama	
Front Page Story	Gordon Parry	Jack Hawkins, Eva Bartok, Elizabeth Allan	Drama	
The Gay Dog	Maurice Elvey	Wilfred Pickles, Petula Clark, Megs Jenkins	Comedy	
Golden Ivory	George Breakston	John Bentley, Robert Urquhart, Susan Stephen	African adventure	
The Golden Link	Charles Saunders	André Morell, Thea Gregory, Patrick Holt	Crime	
The Good Die Young	Lewis Gilbert	Stanley Baker, Richard Basehart, Laurence Harvey	Crime	
The Green Carnation	John Lemont	Wayne Morris, Mary Germaine, Marcia Ashton	Crime	
The Green Scarf	George More O'Ferrall	Michael Redgrave, Ann Todd, Leo Genn	Mystery	
The Happiness of Three Women	Maurice Elvey	Petula Clark, Donald Houston, Brenda de Banzie	Drama	
Happy Ever After	Mario Zampi	David Niven, Yvonne De Carlo, Barry Fitzgerald	Comedy	
The Harassed Hero	Maurice Elvey	Guy Middleton, Elwyn Brook-Jones, Mary Mackenzie	Comedy	
Hell Below Zero	Mark Robson	Alan Ladd, Joan Tetzel, Stanley Baker	Action	
Hobson's Choice	David Lean	Charles Laughton, Brenda De Banzie, John Mills	Comedy	Won the Golden Bear at Berlin
The House Across the Lake	Ken Hughes	Alex Nicol, Hillary Brooke, Susan Stephen	Drama	
Impulse	Cy Endfield	Arthur Kennedy, Constance Smith, Joy Shelton	Crime	
An Inspector Calls	Guy Hamilton	Alastair Sim, Jane Wenham, Eileen Moore	Crime	
John Wesley	Norman Walker	Leonard Sachs, Patrick Holt, Curigwen Lewis	Biopic	
Johnny on the Spot	Maclean Rogers	Hugh McDermott, Elspet Gray, Paul Carpenter	Crime	
Knave of Hearts	René Clément	Gérard Philipe, Valerie Hobson, Joan Greenwood	Comedy/drama	Co-production with France
Lease of Life	Charles Frend	Robert Donat, Kay Walsh, Denholm Elliott	Drama	
Life with the Lyons	Val Guest	Bebe Daniels, Ben Lyon, Barbara Lyon	Comedy	
Lilacs in the Spring	Herbert Wilcox	Errol Flynn, Anna Neagle, David Farrar	Romance	
The Love Lottery	Charles Crichton	David Niven, Peggy Cummins, Anne Vernon, Herbert Lom	Comedy	
Mad About Men	Ralph Thomas	Glynis Johns, Donald Sinden, Anne Crawford	Comedy	
The Maggie	Alexander Mackendrick	Alex Mackenzie, Paul Douglas, Hubert Gregg	Comedy	Ealing Studios
Make Me an Offer	Cyril Frankel	Peter Finch, Adrienne Corri, Finlay Currie	Comedy	
Malaga	Richard Sale	Maureen O'Hara, Macdonald Carey, Binnie Barnes	Crime/drama	
Mask of Dust	Terence Fisher	Richard Conte, Mari Aldon, Peter Illing	Action	
The Master Plan	Cy Endfield	Norman Wooland, Tilda Thamar, Wayne Morris	Drama	
Meet Mr. Callaghan	Charles Saunders	Derrick De Marney, Adrienne Corri, Delphi Lawrence, Belinda Lee	Crime	
Meet Mr. Malcolm	Daniel Birt	Adrianne Allen, Sarah Lawson, Meredith Edwards	Crime	
The Men of Sherwood Forest	Val Guest	Don Taylor, Eileen Moore, Reginald Beckwith	Adventure	
The Million Pound Note	Ronald Neame	Gregory Peck, Wilfrid Hyde-White, Jane Griffiths	Comedy	
Murder by Proxy	Terence Fisher	Dane Clark, Belinda Lee, Betty Ann Davies	Thriller	
The Passing Stranger	John Arnold	Lee Patterson, Diane Cilento, Liam Redmond	Crime	
Profile	Francis Searle	John Bentley, Kathleen Byron, Thea Gregory	Drama	
The Purple Plain	Robert Parrish	Gregory Peck, Win Min Than, Maurice Denham, Bernard Lee	World War II	
Radio Cab Murder	Vernon Sewell	Jimmy Hanley, Lana Morris, Sonia Holm	Crime	
The Rainbow Jacket	Basil Dearden	Bill Owen, Kay Walsh, Robert Morley	Sports/drama	
River Beat	Guy Green	John Bentley, Phyllis Kirk, Robert Ayres	Crime	
Romeo and Juliet	Renato Castellani	Laurence Harvey, Flora Robson, Bill Travers	Literary drama	
The Runaway Bus	Val Guest	Frankie Howerd, Petula Clark, Margaret Rutherford	Comedy	
The Scarlet Spear	George Breakston	John Bentley, Martha Hyer, Thea Gregory	African adventure	
The Scarlet Web	Charles Saunders	Griffith Jones, Hazel Court, Zena Marshall	Crime	
The Sea Shall Not Have Them	Lewis Gilbert	Michael Redgrave, Dirk Bogarde, Anthony Steel	World War II	
Seagulls Over Sorrento	John Boulting, Roy Boulting	Gene Kelly, John Justin, Bernard Lee	Drama	
The Seekers	Ken Annakin	Jack Hawkins, Glynis Johns, Noel Purcell	Adventure	Set in New Zealand
The Sleeping Tiger	Joseph Losey	Alexis Smith, Dirk Bogarde, Alexander Knox	Crime	
Solution by Phone	Alfred Travers	Clifford Evans, Thea Gregory, Georgina Cookson	Crime	
Star of India	Arthur Lubin	Cornel Wilde, Jean Wallace, Herbert Lom	Action	
Star of My Night	Paul Dickson	Griffith Jones, Kathleen Byron, Hugh Williams	Drama	
A Stranger Came Home	Terence Fisher	William Sylvester, Paulette Goddard, Patrick Holt	Drama	
Stranger from Venus	Burt Balaban	Patricia Neal, Helmut Dantine, Derek Bond	Sci-fi	
The Stranger's Hand	Mario Soldati	Trevor Howard, Alida Valli, Richard Basehart	Thriller	Co-production with Italy
Svengali	Noel Langley	Hildegard Knef, Donald Wolfit, Terence Morgan	Drama	
Suicide Mission	Michael Forlong	Leif Larsen, Palmar Bjørnøy	War	Co-production with Norway
The Teckman Mystery	Wendy Toye	Margaret Leighton, John Justin, Roland Culver	Mystery	
They Who Dare	Lewis Milestone	Dirk Bogarde, Denholm Elliott, Akim Tamiroff	World War II	
Third Party Risk	Daniel Birt	Lloyd Bridges, Simone Silva, Finlay Currie	Crime	
Time Is My Enemy	Don Chaffey	Dennis Price, Renée Asherson, Susan Shaw	Crime	
To Dorothy a Son	Muriel Box	Shelley Winters, John Gregson, Peggy Cummins	Comedy	
Trouble in the Glen	Herbert Wilcox	Margaret Lockwood, Orson Welles, Forrest Tucker	Comedy	
Up to His Neck	John Paddy Carstairs	Ronald Shiner, Brian Rix, Laya Raki	Comedy	
The Weak and the Wicked	J. Lee Thompson	Glynis Johns, Diana Dors, John Gregson	Drama	
West of Zanzibar	Harry Watt	Anthony Steel, Sheila Sim, Orlando Martins	African adventure	
What Every Woman Wants	Maurice Elvey	William Sylvester, Elsie Albiin, Brenda De Banzie	Comedy	
You Know What Sailors Are	Ken Annakin	Donald Sinden, Akim Tamiroff, Sarah Lawson	Comedy	
The Young Lovers	Anthony Asquith	Odile Versois, David Knight, Joseph Tomelty	Romance	

== See also ==
- 1954 in British music
- 1954 in British television
- 1954 in the United Kingdom
