= 1954 in the United Kingdom =

Events from the year 1954 in the United Kingdom.

== Incumbents ==
- Monarch – Elizabeth II
- Prime Minister – Winston Churchill (Conservative)
Royal coat of arms of the United Kingdom 1954–2024 (left), Coat of arms of the United Kingdom in Scotland 1954–2024 (right)

== Events ==
- 10 January – A British Overseas Airways Corporation de Havilland Comet jet airliner on BOAC Flight 781 from Singapore to London crashes in the Mediterranean Sea following fatigue failure, killing all 35 on board.
- 25 January – First broadcast of Dylan Thomas's radio play Under Milk Wood, two months after its author's death, with Richard Burton as 'First Voice', on the BBC Third Programme.
- 12 February
  - United Kingdom Atomic Energy Authority founded.
  - British Medical Committee report suggests the existence of a link between smoking and lung cancer.
- 23 March – The film Doctor in the House is released.
- 24 March – After an eight-day trial at Winchester Assizes, The Lord Montagu of Beaulieu, his cousin Michael Pitt-Rivers, and their friend Peter Wildeblood are convicted of "conspiracy to incite certain male persons to commit serious offences with male persons" or buggery and related charges. Pitt-Rivers and Wildebood are sentenced to eighteen months and Lord Montagu to twelve months in prison.
- 2 April – BBC Television broadcasts the first episode of The Grove Family, the first British TV soap opera.
- 3 April – Oxford wins the 100th Boat Race.
- 14 April – Aneurin Bevan resigns from the Labour Party's Shadow Cabinet in protest over his party's failure to oppose the rearmament of West Germany.
- 24 April – Wolverhampton Wanderers win the Football League First Division title for the first time in their history. The result ends the hopes that their local rivals, FA Cup finalists West Bromwich Albion, had of becoming the first team of the 20th century to win the double of the league title and FA Cup.
- 1 May – West Bromwich Albion win the FA Cup for the fourth time in their history with a 3-2 win over Preston North End in the final at Wembley Stadium.
- 6 May – Roger Bannister becomes the first person to break the four-minute mile, at the Iffley Road Track of the University of Oxford.
- 26 May – A new Queen Elizabeth II heraldic Coat of Arms, alongside the new Lesser Arms, used by the UK government, are officially unveiled.
- 29 May – Diane Leather becomes the first woman to break the five-minute mile, at the Alexander Sports Ground in Birmingham.
- 4 June – Protection of Birds Act, promoted by Tufton Beamish, MP, prohibits the killing of wild birds or interference with their eggs or nests.
- 6 June – First broadcast on the Eurovision Network founded by Britain, Belgium, France, West Germany, Italy, the Netherlands and Switzerland of a message from Pope Pius XII.
- 12 June – An Irish Republican Army unit carries out a successful arms raid on Gough Barracks in Armagh, signalling the renewal of IRA activity following a long hiatus.
- 30 June – Britain witnesses its first eclipse since 1927 as the eclipse in America casts its shadow over Europe and Asia.
- July – Crichel Down affair, a political scandal over compulsory land purchase leads to resignation of Sir Thomas Dugdale, the government minister responsible.
- 4 July – Fourteen years of rationing during and following World War II comes to an end when meat officially comes off ration.
- 15 July – Donald McGill, the artist of saucy seaside postcards, found guilty of breaching the Obscene Publications Act 1857 in Lincoln.
- 19 July – United Kingdom Atomic Energy Authority established by the Atomic Energy Act "to produce, use and dispose of atomic energy and carry out research into any matters therewith".
- 3 August – No. 1321 Flight RAF formed at RAF Wittering to bring the Blue Danube (nuclear weapon) into service with Vickers Valiant aircraft.
- 4 August – Maiden flight of the English Electric Lightning P-1 supersonic fighter plane.
- 5 August – Julian Slade's musical Salad Days opens in London, following a premiere at the Bristol Old Vic; it becomes the longest-running musical in British theatre history until 1960.
- September
  - Hunstanton Secondary Modern School, Hunstanton, Norfolk, considered a key building in modern British architecture, designed by Peter and Alison Smithson, opens.
  - Kidbrooke School in the London Borough of Greenwich opens as England's first purpose-built comprehensive school.
- 3 September – The National Trust for Scotland acquires Fair Isle.
- 11 September – Roy of the Rovers comic strip first appears, on the cover of Tiger comic.
- 14 September – Benjamin Britten's chamber opera The Turn of the Screw receives its world premiere at the Teatro La Fenice, Venice.
- 15 September – The Wolfenden Committee, set up to report on "Homosexual Offences and Prostitution", convenes for the first time
- 18 September
  - Marble head of Mithras from London Mithraeum unearthed in Walbrook Square.
  - The Last Night of the Proms for the first time features the almost invariable second-half coupling of Sir Henry Wood's 1905 Fantasia on British Sea Songs, Sir Edward Elgar's 1902 setting of "Land of Hope and Glory", Sir Hubert Parry's 1916 setting of William Blake's "Jerusalem", and "Rule, Britannia!".
- 22 September – Terence Rattigan's plays Separate Tables premiere in London.
- 13 October – Chris Chataway breaks the world record for the 5000 metres by five seconds.
- 14 October – The Ethiopian emperor Haile Selassie visits the United Kingdom.
- 19 October
  - Britain agrees to end its military occupation of the Suez Canal.
  - Exmoor is designated a National Park, the 6th in England.
  - A public inquiry into the de Havilland Comet airline disasters hears that metal fatigue is the most likely cause of the two recent crashes which claimed the lives of a total of 50 people.
- November – Postwar government limitations on housebuilding are lifted.
- 2 November – Radio comedy series Hancock's Half Hour first aired.
- 13 November
  - The Great Britain national rugby league team beat France to win the first Rugby League World Cup at the Parc des Princes in Paris.
  - BBC Television broadcasts the first episode of Fabian of the Yard, the first British TV police procedural.
- 27 November – The South Goodwin lightvessel is wrecked on the Goodwin Sands with the loss of six of the seven on board. The tanker World Concord breaks in two in the Irish Sea.
- 29 November – The leading case of Ladd v Marshall is decided in the Court of Appeal of England and Wales, establishing criteria for the Court to admit fresh evidence in a case on which a judgement has already been delivered.
- 30 November – Winston Churchill becomes the first, and to the present day, the only UK Prime Minister to celebrate his eightieth birthday whilst in office.
- 25 December – 1954 Prestwick air disaster: BOAC Boeing 377 Stratocruiser G-ALSA crashes on landing at Prestwick Airport from London in poor visibility at 03:30, killing 28.
- Undated – The first UK Wimpy Bar is opened at the Lyons Corner House in Coventry Street, London.

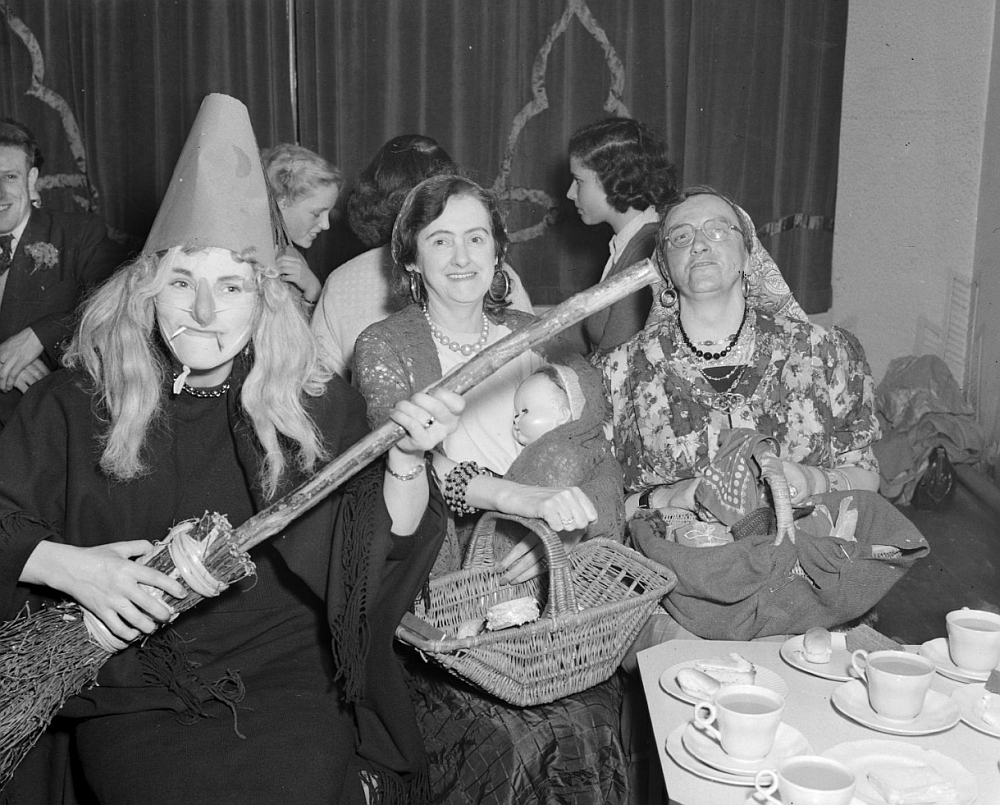
1954 Hallowe'en Party of the Oswestry Caledonian Society

== Publications ==
- Kingsley Amis's first work of fiction, the comic campus novel Lucky Jim.
- Agatha Christie's spy novel Destination Unknown.
- Ian Fleming's James Bond spy novel Live and Let Die.
- William Golding's first book, the dystopian allegorical novel Lord of the Flies.
- Elizabeth Jenkins' novel of married life The Tortoise and the Hare.
- C. S. Lewis's children's fantasy novel The Horse and His Boy, fifth of The Chronicles of Narnia.
- Iris Murdoch's first work of fiction, the philosophical picaresque novel Under the Net.
- Alan S. C. Ross's paper "Linguistic class-indicators in present-day English" in Neuphilologische Mitteilungen.
- Rosemary Sutcliff's historical children's novel The Eagle of the Ninth illustrated by C. Walter Hodges, first in the series of the same name.
- J. R. R. Tolkien's epic high fantasy novels The Fellowship of the Ring (29 July) and The Two Towers (11 November), the first two volumes of The Lord of the Rings trilogy.

== Births ==
- 4 January – Dave Ulliott, professional poker player (died 2015)
- 6 January
  - Anthony Minghella, film director (died 2008)
  - Trudie Styler, actress and activist
- 10 January – John Gidman, footballer and manager
- 22 January – Paul O'Brien, chemist (died 2018)
- 7 February – Billy Kellock, footballer (died 2024)
- 9 February
  - Ian Duhig, poet
  - Kevin Warwick, scientist
- 16 February – Iain Banks, writer (died 2013)
- 20 February – Anthony Head, actor (died 2026)
- 4 March – Willie Thorne, snooker player (died 2020)
- 8 March
  - Cheryl Baker, singer and television presenter
  - David Wilkie, swimmer (died 2024)
- 13 March – Valerie Amos, Baroness Amos, politician
- 15 March – Clare Marx, surgeon (died 2022)
- 16 March – Jimmy Nail, singer, songwriter, actor, film producer, and television writer
- 17 March – Lesley-Anne Down, actress
- 24 March – Jude Kelly, arts administrator
- 30 March – Kari Blackburn, journalist (died 2007)
- 1 April – Arnold Sidebottom, footballer and cricketer
- 6 April – Judi Bowker, actress
- 9 April – Iain Duncan Smith, politician
- 19 April – Trevor Francis, footballer (died 2023)
- 28 April – Monica McWilliams, academic and politician
- 1 May – Archie Norman, politician and businessman
- 8 May – Gary Wilmot, entertainer
- 9 May – Andrew Dillon, businessman
- 14 May – Peter J. Ratcliffe, cellular biologist, recipient of Nobel Prize in Physiology or Medicine
- 28 May – Andy Hamilton, comedian, director and screenwriter
- 20 June – Carl G. Jones, conservation biologist
- 28 June – A. A. Gill, journalist and writer (died 2016)
- 8 July – Mark Tavener, novelist and humorist (died 2007)
- 10 July – Neil Tennant, musician
- 18 July – Peter Crane, English-American botanist and academic
- 2 August – Sammy McIlroy, Northern Irish footballer and football manager
- 9 August – Pete Thomas, drummer
- 11 August – Joe Jackson, singer
- 16 August – George Galloway, politician
- 23 August – Ian Bartholomew, actor
- 25 August
  - Elvis Costello, singer
  - Jim Wallace, Baron Wallace of Tankerness, politician (died 2026)
- 26 August – Steve Wright, disc jockey (died 2024)
- 27 August – Derek Warwick, racing driver
- 1 September – Richard Burden, politician
- 5 September – Danny Masterton, Scottish footballer (died 2020)
- 15 September – Colin Cunningham, swimmer
- 19 September – Mark Drakeford, Welsh politician
- 24 September – Helen Lederer, Welsh comedian and actress
- 29 October – Lee Child, writer
- 3 November – Adam Ant, singer
- 8 November – Kazuo Ishiguro, Japanese-born author, recipient of Nobel Prize in Literature
- 5 December – Hanif Kureishi, novelist and screenwriter
- 6 December – Edward Tudor-Pole, musician and actor
- 8 December – Louis de Bernières, author
- 25 December – Annie Lennox, singer
- 31 December – Alex Salmond, Scottish National Party leader and First Minister of Scotland (died 2024)

== Deaths ==
- 18 January – Sydney Greenstreet, actor (born 1879)
- 20 January – Fred Root, cricketer (born 1890)
- 8 February – Ronald Stuart, Royal Navy captain, Victoria Cross recipient (born 1886)
- 10 February – Louise Hampton, English actress (born 1879)
- 4 March – John Dalzell Kenworthy, artist, sculptor and writer (born 1858)
- 9 March – Sydney Bacon Palmer, rubber industry leader (born 1890)
- 26 March – James Peters, black rugby union international (born 1879)
- 29 April – K. C. Groom, fiction writer (born 1872)
- 6 May – B. C. Forbes, Scottish-born publisher (born 1880)
- 7 June – Alan Turing, mathematician, logician and cryptographer (born 1912)
- 9 June – Arthur Greenwood, politician (born 1880)
- 11 July – Henry Valentine Knaggs, physician and author (born 1859)
- 24 September – Edward Pilgrim, victim of bureaucracy (born 1904)
- 20 December – James Hilton, novelist (born 1900)

== See also ==
- 1954 in British music
- 1954 in British television
- List of British films of 1954
