= 1954 in British television =

This is a list of British television related events from 1954.

== Events ==
=== January ===
- 11 January – The first weather forecast with an in-vision presenter is televised in the United Kingdom, its first presenter is George Cowling.

=== February ===
- No events.

=== March ===
- No events.

=== April ===
- 9 April – The Grove Family, generally considered the first British television soap opera, debuts on the BBC Television Service.
- 21 April – The BBC Television comedy sketch programme Running Wild marks the debut of Morecambe and Wise on British television.

=== May ===
- No events.

=== June ===
- No events.

=== July ===
- 5 July – First actual news bulletin, News and Newsreel, aired on the BBC Television Service, replacing Television Newsreel.
- 30 July – The Television Act 1954 is given Royal Assent. It authorises the setting up of the infrastructure for British commercial television.

=== August ===
- No events.

=== September ===
- No events.

=== October ===
- 7 October – BBC Television covers a party political conference for the first time when it broadcasts from the Conservative Party Conference in Blackpool.
- October – The ITA announces that Kemsley-Winnick Television has been successful in obtaining the initial franchises for weekend television in the North and the Midlands of England. Following withdrawal of Kemsley-Winnick's financial backing, the contract will be withdrawn.

=== November ===
- 12 November – The BBC opens Rowridge transmitting station on the Isle of Wight, bringing television coverage to the Solent area.

=== December ===
- 12 December – The BBC Television Service screens its acclaimed adaptation of George Orwell's Nineteen Eighty-Four, adapted by Nigel Kneale and starring Peter Cushing. The Sunday broadcast proves controversial however and attracts some criticism in the House of Commons. Screened live, a second production takes place 4 days later.
- 21 December – The BBC begins broadcasting the first series of nature documentary Zoo Quest, the first major programme to feature David Attenborough as a presenter.
- 30 December – The first BBC Sports Personality of the Year ceremony is presented from London's Savoy Hotel. Christopher Chataway is the first winner. The award airs annually from now on.
- The British Academy Television Awards, the most prestigious awards in the British television industry, are first awarded.

== Debuts ==
=== BBC Television Service ===
- 5 January – A Castle and Sixpence (1954)
- 16 January – The Lost Planet (1954)
- 19 January – Show Case (1954–1955)
- 27 January – Friends and Neighbours (1954)
- 6 February – Clementina (1954)
- 16 February – The Cabin in the Clearing (1954)
- 17 February – The Bespoke Overcoat (1954)
- 30 March – The Wide, Wide World (1954)
- 31 March – Gravelhanger (1954)
- 8 April – The Cisco Kid (1950–1956)
- 9 April – The Grove Family (1954–1957)
- 21 April – Running Wild (1954)
- 8 May – The Pat Kirkwood Show (1954)
- 11 May – The Windmill Family (1954)
- 12 May
  - The Dancing Bear (1954)
  - Fast and Loose (1954–1955)
- 23 May – The Promised Years (1954)
- May – Ask Pickles (1954–1956)
- 7 June – Emney Enterprises (1954–1957)
- 15 June – The Gentle Falcon (1954)
- 10 July – Happy Holidays (1954)
- 13 July – Dear Dotty (1954)
- 14 July – The Six Proud Walkers (1954)
- 27 July – Misalliance (1954)
- 3 August – Paradise Island (1954)
- 16 August – Stage by Stage (1954–1955)
- 25 August – Crime on Our Hands (1954)
- 1 October – And So to Bentley (1954)
- 5 October – The Face of Love (1954)
- 21 October – The Burning Bush (1954)
- 13 November – Fabian of the Yard (1954–1956)
- 24 November – The Three Musketeers (1954)
- 12 December – Nineteen Eighty-Four (1954)
- 21 December – Zoo Quest (1954–1963)
- 24 December – Carols From Kings (1954–present)
- Unknown –
  - Meet David Berglas
  - Sportsview (1954–1968)
  - Walk in the Air (1954–1955)

=== Independent productions ===
- The Halls of Ivy (produced by ITC Entertainment)
- The Vise (produced by Danziger Productions)

== Continuing television shows ==
=== 1920s ===
- BBC Wimbledon (1927–1939, 1946–2019, 2021–present)

=== 1930s ===
- Trooping the Colour (1937–1939, 1946–2019, 2023–present)
- The Boat Race (1938–1939, 1946–2019, 2021–present)
- BBC Cricket (1939, 1946–1999, 2020–2024)

=== 1940s ===
- Muffin the Mule (1946–1955, 2005–2006)
- The Ed Sullivan Show (1948–1971)
- Come Dancing (1949–1998)

=== 1950s ===
- Andy Pandy (1950–1970, 2002–2005)
- Flower Pot Men (1952–1958, 2001–2002)
- Watch with Mother (1952–1975)
- The Appleyards (1952–1957)
- All Your Own (1952–1961)
- Rag, Tag and Bobtail (1953–1965)
- The Good Old Days (1953–1983)
- Panorama (1953–present)

== Ending this year ==
- Television Newsreel (1948–1954)

== Births ==
- 6 January – John Sparkes, comedian
- 20 February – Anthony Head, actor (died 2026)
- 16 March – Jimmy Nail, actor and singer
- 17 March – Lesley-Anne Down, actress
- 28 April – Mary Jo Randle, actress
- 9 May – Nicholas Crane, geographer and TV presenter
- 21 June – Anne Kirkbride, actress (Deirdre Barlow in Coronation Street) (died 2015)
- 16 July – Nicholas Frankau, actor
- 21 August – Clive Tyldesley, football commentator
- 26 August – Steve Wright, broadcaster (died 2024)
- 27 August – Andrew Marshall, scriptwriter
- 8 September – Anne Diamond, journalist and television presenter
- 24 September
  - Helen Lederer, comedian and actress
  - Martin Sixsmith, journalist, author and radio and television presenter
- 3 October – Jeff Randall, journalist and television presenter
- 14 October – Carole Malone, journalist and presenter
- 19 October – Ken Stott, actor
- 24 November – Susan Gilmore, actress (Avril Rolfe in Howards' Way)
- 1 December – Alan Dedicoat, newsreader and the National Lottery's "Voice of the Balls"
- 5 December – Hanif Kureishi, novelist and screenwriter
- 22 December – Hugh Quarshie, actor

== See also ==
- 1954 in British music
- 1954 in the United Kingdom
- List of British films of 1954
