= Eyewitness (1970 film) =

British thriller by John Hough

- Theatrical poster
- Directed by: John Hough
- Written by: Ronald Harwood; Bryan Forbes (uncredited)
- Based on: Eyewitness by Mark Hebden
- Produced by: Paul Maslansky
- Starring: Mark Lester; Susan George; Lionel Jeffries
- Cinematography: David Holmes
- Edited by: Geoffrey Foot
- Music by: David Whitaker; Van der Graaf Generator; Fairfield Parlour
- Production companies: ABPC; Irving Allen Productions
- Distributed by: MGM-EMI
- Release date: 10 September 1970
- Running time: 92 minutes
- Country: United Kingdom
- Language: English

Eyewitness (released as Sudden Terror in the United States) is a 1970 British thriller film directed by John Hough and starring Mark Lester, Susan George and Lionel Jeffries. Its plot follows a young English boy who, while staying with his grandfather and adult sister in Malta, witnesses a political assassination, and is subsequently pursued by the killers—however, due to his habitual lying, those around him are hesitant to believe his claims. It is an adaptation of the novel by Mark Hebden, the pen name for John Harris, and bears similarity to Cornell Woolrich's novelette "The Boy Cried Murder", originally adapted for film as The Window.

== Plot ==
Ziggy, an English boy, spends the summer in Malta with his adult sister, Pippa, at their grandfather's lighthouse. To ease his boredom, Ziggy invents a fantasy world of adventure. In doing so, he acquires a reputation as the family's worst liar. One day, Pippa drives to town with Ziggy to join crowds welcoming a visiting African dignitary. As Pippa makes the acquaintance of a young tourist named Tom, Ziggy slips away to seek a better view of the festivities. Suddenly, the dignitary's open-top car is fired upon and all occupants are killed. Ziggy is the only spectator to eyeball the perpetrators, one of whom wears a policeman's uniform. Realizing the boy has caught them in the act, the assassins chase Ziggy all over town but fail to catch him. Meantime, Pippa and Tom locate Ziggy at the town's edge. While returning to the lighthouse, he tells his sister what he witnessed, but neither she nor Tom believes him. Later, a Malta TV broadcast informs viewers that martial law has been declared and a curfew issued, so Tom stays overnight with Ziggy, Pippa, and Grandfather.

As the evening progresses, Grandfather discovers Ziggy might be telling the truth when police mysteriously show up to check on who is staying at the lighthouse. Ziggy panics and runs off. Once in town, he hides out with Ann-Marie, a young girl friend. In trying to help Ziggy, she breaks curfew and is picked up by police. She is later slain by the assassin's brother, also a renegade cop. The killers spot Ziggy and chase him into the catacombs beneath a church. They kill a priest who has offered sanctuary to the boy, but Ziggy manages to escape again.

Back at the lighthouse, Pippa, Tom, and Grandfather set out into the dark night in Pippa's car to locate the boy. After reaching town, they eventually find Ziggy hiding under a table in the dead priest's church. Meanwhile, the uniformed assassin spots their car and shoots at the house. Grandpa and Tom devise Molotov cocktails using paraffin lamps filled with brandy. Grandpa's continuous bombardment keeps the uniformed villains at bay while Pippa, Tom, and Ziggy slip out and beat a path for Pippa's vehicle. A car chase ensues into the early morning hours. As they approach the rocky coast, the assassin uses his police cruiser to ram Pippa's car off the road. He succeeds in toppling the car onto its side, but as he pushes it towards a cliff's edge, Grandpa and the Chief of Police arrive just in time to shoot the assassin, whose cruiser falls over the cliff and into the water below.

== Cast ==
- Mark Lester as Ziggy
- Lionel Jeffries as Grandpa
- Susan George as Pippa
- Jeremy Kemp as Inspector Galleria
- Peter Vaughan as Paul Grazzini the policeman/murderer
- Tony Bonner as Tom Jones
- Betty Marsden as Madame Robiac the housekeeper
- Peter Bowles as Victor Grazzini
- Joseph Fürst as Local Police Sergeant
- David Lodge as Local Policeman
- Maxine Kalli as Ann-Marie
- Jeremy Young as Monk
- Christopher Robbie as Policeman
- Tom Eytle as Visiting President

== Production ==
=== Background ===
The film is based on a 1966 novel Eyewitness by Mark Hebden (a pen name for John Harris). The novel was set in France (Siggy had a French mother and American father) and concerned an assassination attempt on the French president. The New York Times called it "simple and predictable... but a good deal of charm and spirit in the storyline". The Spectator called it "a colourful, busy and suspenseful affair".

The final film was a co-production between EMI Films, then under Bryan Forbes, and ITC Entertainment.

John Hough, who had made the film Wolfshead: The Legend of Robin Hood, learned that Bryan Forbes had taken over EMI Films and was interested in young filmmakers. He called Forbes and showed him his film at Forbes's office in Elstree. (This was filmed by a BBC documentary on Forbes called Man Alive.) Forbes thought Wolfshead was "outstanding". He had a script called Eyewitness, which he had given to Irving Allen to make and Paul Maslansky to produce. Hough was assigned to direct. Forbes says he persuaded Allen to let Hough direct and did some uncredited rewriting of the script at Allen's insistence.

=== Filming ===
The film was shot entirely in Malta (mainly Valletta), although in the movie the name of the nation is not given, and the flag (a modified cross with red and white colours) and coat of arms shown are different from Malta's.

The lighthouse is Delimara Lighthouse.

=== Music ===
Jonathan Demme was working as a rock journalist in London during filming and was hired by Irving Allen to be a musical co-ordinator on the film.

The film includes music by Fairfield Parlour and additional music by Van der Graaf Generator.

== Release ==
Eyewitness opened in London on 10 September 1970. In December 1970, National General agreed to distribute the film in the United States.

== Response ==
=== Critical ===
Variety called it "a fairly conventional crime chase yarn" which "has some exciting moments but lacks much of the tension that more astute and experienced directors than John Hough might have given it. Nevertheless, it makes a good programmer."

The Monthly Film Bulletin wrote: "A crime thriller with no pretensions to credibility. After shooting the wrong man by mistake, the Mafia-affiliated villains chase round the island leaving a trail of bodies and providing an excuse for a lot of spectacular motorcycling and car-driving. Many of the shots are of action reflected in motorbike or car mirrors, or taken at assorted odd camera angles; devices like the Colonel seen through his own spectacles as they lie on a table are common; and the director's passion for distortion is evident in scenes like the one where a waiter is murdered with a jewelled hatpin. The continual cross-cutting between the different strands keeps the action moving, and effective use is made of the Maltese location, with its narrow, winding, cobbled streets, long flights of steps, cliff-tops and catacombs. The script is a poverty-stricken variant on the boy who cried 'wolf!', but considering the banality of most of his lines, Lionel Jeffries makes quite a character out of the old-world grandfather who puts on dress uniform for dinner, and Peter Vaughan is a suitably sinister villain."

Paul Moody, in his history on EMI Films, called Eyewitness "an excellent and neglected thriller, intelligently directed and with strong performances, especially from Jeffries. Thankfully for Forbes, this was his first critical success, with most reviews commenting on the performances of Jeffries and Peter Vaughan as the villainous policeman."

The Guardian said "it is not a bad evening out."

The Evening Standard called it "quite suspenseful... but tricked up with so many distorting lenses, zoom focuses and calculated camera set ups that it looks as if director John Hough were heped by an astigmatic computer."

The New York Times called the film an "exasperating model of how not to film the fable of the boy who cried wolf... What ever happened to British restraint? The tone of the film is even more hysterical than the boy... Under John Hough's direction, the picture raucously careens after the sprinting lad, with the nervous color camera all but doing a back flip, plus a blaring score of eerie sounds and spookier rock 'n' roll. Worst of all, the screenplay continually cuts from the boy and his plight to some singularly dull adults."

The Los Angeles Times called it "thoroughly satisfying". Filmink argued the main fault of the film was it had four different heroes.

=== Box office ===
According to EMI Records, the film performed "outstandingly" in Japan. However, overall it was a box-office disappointment.

== Adaptations ==
The film is the third of four versions of the story. The others are:

- The Window (1949)
- The Boy Cried Murder (1966)
- Cloak & Dagger (1984)
