= 1954 in British music =

This is a summary of 1954 in music of all genres in the United Kingdom.

== Events ==
- 14 January – The Boy Friend, opens in the West End, with understudy Anne Rogers in the lead role after Diana Maddox falls ill at the dress rehearsal.
- 5 August – Salad Days opens in the West End after a short run in Bristol. It becomes the longest-running musical in British theatre history until overtaken by Oliver! in 1960.
- 14 September – Benjamin Britten conducts the premiere of his opera The Turn of the Screw at Teatro La Fenice, Venice.
- 18 September – The Last Night of the Proms for the first time features the subsequently almost-invariable second-half coupling of Sir Henry Wood's 1905 Fantasia on British Sea Songs, Sir Edward Elgar's 1902 setting of "Land of Hope and Glory", Sir Hubert Parry's 1916 setting of William Blake's "Jerusalem", and "Rule, Britannia!".
- 1 October – The UK Singles Chart is expanded into a Top 20.
- 3 December – William Walton's opera Troilus and Cressida opens at the Royal Opera House, Covent Garden. It is not a success.

== Charts ==
- See UK No.1 Hits of 1954

== Classical music: new works ==
- Gerald Finzi – Cello Concerto in A minor
- Alun Hoddinott – Clarinet Concerto
- Daniel Jones – Symphony No. 4
- Ralph Vaughan Williams – Tuba Concerto in F minor

== Opera ==
- Benjamin Britten – The Turn of the Screw
- Arwel Hughes – Menna
- John Joubert – Antigone (for radio)
- William Walton – Troilus and Cressida

== Film and Incidental music ==
- Malcolm Arnold
  - The Belles of St Trinian's, starring Alistair Sim.
  - Hobson's Choice directed by David Lean, starring Charles Laughton, Brenda De Banzie, John Mills and Prunella Scales.
  - The Sea Shall Not Have Them, starring Michael Redgrave, Dirk Bogarde and Anthony Steel.
- Francis Chagrin – An Inspector Calls directed by Guy Hamilton, starring Alastair Sim.
- Eric Coates – The Dam Busters March
- Mátyás Seiber – Animal Farm

== Musical theatre ==
- Salad Days, with music by Julian Slade and lyrics by Dorothy Reynolds and Julian Slade
- Zuleika, with music by Peter Tranchell and lyrics by James Ferman

== Musical films ==
- Lilacs in the Spring, starring Anna Neagle

== Births ==
- 23 January – Edward Ka-Spel, singer-songwriter
- 8 March – Cheryl Baker, singer (Bucks Fizz)
- 15 March – Isobel Buchanan, operatic soprano
- 30 April – Christopher Wright, composer (died 2024)
- 8 May
  - John Michael Talbot, American singer-songwriter and guitarist (Mason Proffit)
  - Gary Wilmot, entertainer
- 11 May – Judith Weir, composer
- 10 July – Neil Tennant, singer-songwriter and record producer (Pet Shop Boys)
- 11 August – Joe Jackson, singer, songwriter and composer
- 25 August – Elvis Costello, singer-songwriter
- 3 November – Adam Ant, singer
- 4 November – Chris Difford, singer, songwriter and record producer (Squeeze)
- 18 November – John Parr, singer
- 7 December – Mike Nolan, singer (Bucks Fizz)
- 10 December – Jack Hues, singer-songwriter and guitarist (Wang Chung)
- 25 December – Annie Lennox, singer
- date unknown – Timothy Bowers, composer

== Deaths ==
- 18 January – Herbert Heyner, operatic baritone, 71
- 3 March – Noel Gay, songwriter, 55
- 4 April – Frederick Lonsdale, dramatist of musicals, 73
- 24 July – Anne Gilchrist, folk song collector, 90
- 9 August – Frederick Keel, baritone singer and composer, 83
- 14 December – Philip Ritte, operatic tenor, 83
- 29 November – Sir George Robey, music hall star, 85
- date unknown – George Alex Stevens, songwriter and musical show director

== See also ==
- 1954 in British television
- 1954 in the United Kingdom
- List of British films of 1954
