= The Heart of the Matter (film) =

1953 British film based on the 1948 novel

- Film poster
- Directed by: George More O'Ferrall
- Written by: Lesley Storm; Ian Dalrymple
- Based on: The Heart of the Matter by Graham Greene
- Produced by: Ian Dalrymple
- Starring: Trevor Howard; Elizabeth Allan; Maria Schell; Denholm Elliott
- Cinematography: Jack Hildyard
- Edited by: Sidney Stone
- Music by: Edric Connor
- Production company: London Films
- Distributed by: British Lion Films
- Release date: 3 November 1953
- Running time: 100 minutes
- Country: United Kingdom
- Language: English
- Box office: £123,479 (UK)

The Heart of the Matter is a 1953 British drama film based on the 1948 book of the same name by Graham Greene. It was directed by George More O'Ferrall for London Films. It was entered into the 1953 Cannes Film Festival.

== Plot ==
Harry Scobie, Deputy Commissioner of the Sierra Leone Police in Freetown during the Second World War, is unhappily married to fellow-Catholic Louise: both mourn the death of their only daughter. Despite his having been a police officer in the country for 15 years, when the Police Commissioner announces he is to retire, Scobie is overlooked in favour of a younger man sent out from the UK.

On a search of a neutral Portuguese ship, the Esperança, he finds an envelope addressed to Germany. When he confiscates it, the captain begs him to do nothing because the letter is to his daughter. Feeling pity, Scobie burns it. His wife does not like the climate or the other expatriates and keeps begging him to let her go to South Africa by sea but they cannot afford the fare. Eventually he accepts a loan from Yusef, a suspected smuggler.

Called up country because a local District Commissioner is in trouble, he finds the man has committed suicide because of his debts. While he is there, survivors of a ship torpedoed by the Germans are brought ashore by the Vichy police of neighbouring French Guinea. One is Helen, a young widow who reminds him of his dead daughter. Back in Freetown, he finds she has been given a hut near his house and, after he pays her a visit, they commence an affair. After an argument, he writes her a love letter but it is intercepted by a servant in Yusef's pay.

He learns that Louise is returning and Yusef tells him that he must give a packet of contraband diamonds to the captain of the Esperança or he will give his wife his letter to Helen. He complies. However, someone tells Louise about the affair.

Scobie is in torment between his love for Helen and his responsibilities to his wife, his wartime role and particularly his religious faith. He contemplates suicide but is then killed trying to stop a brawl.

== Cast ==
- Trevor Howard as Harry Scobie
- Elizabeth Allan as Louise Scobie
- Maria Schell as Helen Rolt
- Denholm Elliott as Wilson
- Peter Finch as Father Rank
- Gérard Oury as Yusef
- George Coulouris as Portuguese Captain
- Michael Hordern as Commissioner
- Peter Burton as Perrot
- Earl Cameron as Ali
- Judith Furse as Dr. Sykes
- Evelyn Roberts as Col. Wright
- Colin Gordon as Secretary
- Orlando Martins as Rev. Clay
- Cyril Raymond as Carter
- Gillian Lind as Mrs Carter

== Production ==
It contains no original score, but instead features indigenous music from Sierra Leone in West Africa, where location filming took place. The interiors were filmed at Shepperton Studios in London. The film's sets were designed by the art director Joseph Bato. The black and white cinematography was by Jack Hildyard.

== Differences between film and book ==
The main difference between the film and the book is in the ending, which is almost equally bleak, but reversed from Greene's original story. In the book, Scobie's servant is killed (apparently an act of revenge by Yusef, here played by Gérard Oury). Scobie commits suicide. In the film, Scobie intends to kill himself, but is interrupted by a fight breaking out. He intervenes and is shot. The servant (Earl Cameron) does not die, but instead Scobie dies in his servant's arms.
