= The Maze (1953 film) =

1953 film by William Cameron Menzies

- Theatrical release poster
- Directed by: William Cameron Menzies
- Screenplay by: Daniel Ullman
- Based on: The Maze by Maurice Sandoz
- Produced by: Richard Heermance; Walter Mirisch (executive producer)
- Starring: Richard Carlson; Veronica Hurst; Katherine Emery
- Cinematography: Harry Neumann
- Edited by: John Fuller
- Music by: Marlin Skiles
- Production company: Allied Artists Pictures Corporation
- Distributed by: Allied Artists Pictures Corporation
- Release date: July 26, 1953
- Running time: 80 minutes
- Country: United States
- Language: English

The Maze is a 1953 3-D horror film starring Richard Carlson, Veronica Hurst and Hillary Brooke. It was directed by William Cameron Menzies and distributed by Allied Artists Pictures. It was to be the second 3-D film designed and directed by William Cameron Menzies, known for his very "dimensional" style (e.g. many shots focused in layers). It was his final film as production designer and director.

== Plot ==
A Scotsman, Gerald MacTeam (Richard Carlson), abruptly breaks off his engagement to beautiful Kitty (Veronica Hurst) after receiving word of his uncle's death. He inherits a mysterious castle in the Scottish highlands and moves there to live with the castle servants. Kitty refuses to accept the broken engagement and travels there with her aunt (Katherine Emery). When they arrive, they discover Gerald has suddenly aged and his manner has changed significantly.

After a series of mysterious events in the castle and its hedge maze, they invite a group of friends there, including a doctor, hoping they can help Gerald with whatever ails him. Although the friends are equally concerned by Gerald's behavior, they are at a loss as to its cause. One night, Kitty and her aunt steal a key to their bedroom door (which is always locked from the outside) and sneak out into the mysterious maze. There, they find Gerald and his servants tending to a frog-like monster. The monster panics upon seeing the strangers and runs back to the castle, hurling itself from a top-story balcony to its death.

Gerald explains that the amphibious creature was the actual 200-year-old master of the castle, Sir Roger MacTeam. Sir Roger never progressed beyond an amphibious embryonic stage, causing him to develop into a frog-like creature whose only pleasure was swimming in the castle's pond. Gerald and his ancestors were merely Sir Roger's servants. The death of Sir Roger releases Gerald from his obligation and he can return to a normal life.

== Cast ==
- Richard Carlson as Gerald MacTeam
- Veronica Hurst as Kitty Murray
- Katherine Emery as Edith Murray
- Michael Pate as William
- John Dodsworth as Dr. Bert Dilling
- Hillary Brooke as Peggy Lord
- Stanley Fraser as Robert
- Lilian Bond as Margaret Dilling (as Lillian Bond)
- Owen McGiveney as Simon
- Robin Hughes as Richard Roblar

== Reception ==
Critical reception for The Maze has been mixed, with some critics praising the film's acting, atmosphere, and direction while criticizing the finale. Author and film critic Leonard Maltin awarded the film two out of four stars, calling the finale "ludicrous (and unsatisfying)". Brett Gallman from Oh, the Horror! gave the film a negative review, criticizing the film's "bloated" runtime, and plot development, calling it a footnote in director Menzies' career. Dennis Schwartz from Ozus' World Movie Reviews awarded the film a grade B, calling it, "A moronic but entertaining horror/sci fi film." TV Guide awarded the film two out of four stars, commending the film's acting, direction, and set design, calling it above-average. However, the reviewer felt that the film was somewhat hampered by its low budget.

Dave Sindelar, on his website Fantastic Movie Musings and Ramblings gave the film a more positive review, writing, "I have a lot of affection for this eerie horror/SF movie, though it took me a couple of viewings. The first time I saw the movie, I did get caught up in the eerie mood and the atmospheric sense of dread and tragedy that pervaded the castle, but the revelation concerning the nature of the true lord of the castle caused me to break out in laughter rather than to rear back in horror, and it ruined the movie for me. The second time I saw it, I was prepared, and was able to see beyond this flaw and appreciate how touching and sad the ending of the movie was. Part of the credit must go to Richard Carlson’s excellent performance, one of the best of his I’ve seen."
