= The Good Beginning =

1953 British drama film

- Directed by: Gilbert Gunn
- Written by: Janet Green
- Starring: John Fraser; Eileen Moore; Peter Reynolds
- Cinematography: Lionel Banes
- Edited by: Richard Best
- Music by: Robert Gill
- Production company: Associated British Picture Corporation
- Release date: 1953
- Running time: 65 minutes
- Country: United Kingdom
- Language: English

The Good Beginning is a 1953 British drama film directed by Gilbert Gunn and starring John Fraser, Eileen Moore and Peter Reynolds. It was written by Janet Green.

== Plot ==
Recently married, Johnny and Kit Lipton move into their new flat, and Kit tries to run the family home economically. Because she insists on paying only with the cash they have, there are few luxuries. When Johnny is promoted at work, he pays a deposit on a fur coat for Kit. When he falls behind on the payments, he unsuccessfully turns to gambling. When the furrier threatens to repossess the coat, Johnny embezzles money from his office to repay the debt. His friend Brian Watson rescues him by persuading Kit to sell the coat and return the stolen money to the company.

== Cast ==
- John Fraser as Johnny Lipson
- Eileen Moore as Kit Lipson
- Peter Reynolds as Brian Watson
- Lana Morris as Evie Watson
- Humphrey Lestocq as Thorogood
- Hugh Pryse as Braithwaite
- Ann Stephens as Polly
- Peter Jones as furrier
- David Kossoff as dealer

== Reception ==
The Monthly Film Bulletin wrote: "'There is really not enough material here to make a successful film; had it been treated as a comedy it might have shown some vitality, but the theme, which seems to be that if only one can become self-employed most money troubles will cease, is quite artificial. The script presents problems which few of the players can surmount and, though they do their best, only Peter Jones seems really at ease."

Kine Weekly wrote: "Shrewd, snappy and morally sound domestic comedy drama. ... John Fraser and Eileen Moore admirably suggest the middle-class hero and heroine and their unaffected portrayals, backed up by resourceful direction, smoothly underline its basic human and humorous qualities, while at the same time contributing to a suspenseful climax. ... John Fraser and Eileen Moore are ideally cast as Johnny and Kit, and Peter Reynolds and Lana Morris score in contrast and create effective light relief as Brian and Evie. ... The dénouement has real suspense and completes a little gem of its type."

In British Sound Films: The Studio Years 1928–1959 David Quinlan rated the film as "mediocre", writing: "Too modest to be either comedy or drama."

== Bibliography ==
- Harper, Sue & Porter, Vincent. British Cinema of the 1950s: The Decline of Deference. Oxford University Press, 2007.
