= Andrew Cruickshank =

Scottish actor (1907–1988)

- Born: Andrew John Maxton Cruickshank; 25 December 1907; Aberdeen, Scotland
- Died: 29 April 1988 (aged 80); London, England
- Years active: 1937–1988
- Spouse: Curigwen Lewis

Andrew John Maxton Cruickshank (25 December 1907 – 29 April 1988) was a Scottish actor, most famous for his portrayal of Dr Cameron in the long-running UK BBC television series Dr. Finlay's Casebook, which ran for 191 episodes from 1962 until 1971. He was born in Aberdeen and died in London.

== Life and career ==
Andrew Cruickshank (Junior) was born to Andrew and Annie Cruickshank (Cadger), and was educated at Aberdeen Grammar School. He was to have entered the profession of civil engineering after completing his education, but instead joined provincial repertory theatres, leading to 1930 roles in Othello at the Savoy Theatre in London, as Maudelyn in Richard of Bordeaux at the Empire Theatre on Broadway in 1934, and culminating in his principal appearance (as three characters) on the London stage in 1935, at the Gate Theatre in the play Victoria Regina. In 1939 Cruickshank played Claudius in Tyrone Guthrie's modern-dress and uncut Hamlet at The Old Vic with Alec Guinness in the title role. He returned to Broadway in 1951 until 1952, as the Earl of Warwick in George Bernard Shaw's play Saint Joan, with Uta Hagen in the lead role.

His first film role followed in 1937, as the poet Robert Burns in Auld Lang Syne. Subsequently, however, he would be typecast into portrayals of formal authority figures, such as judges and doctors.

He appeared in many television plays and series, amongst them A. J. Cronin's Dr. Finlay's Casebook, containing his most famous characterisation, Doctor Angus Cameron, a crusty but erudite senior partner in the rural general practice run in Tannochbrae, with the help of the much younger Doctor Alan Finlay (Bill Simpson) and "stiff Presbyterian" housekeeper Janet (Barbara Mullen). The highly popular BBC production ran from 16 August 1962 until 3 January 1971, after which Cruickshank continued with it on BBC Radio 4 for seven years, it having been adapted to that format since 10 March 1970. He finally bade farewell to the character on 18 December 1978, following its parting episode, "Going Home". In 1963 he played the title role in the BBC sitcom Mr Justice Duncannon, having appeared as that character in the final episode of the 1962 sitcom Brothers in Law.

Later on BBC Radio 4, Cruickshank starred in The Senior Partner, a light legal drama series by Donald Bull. The first series of eight episodes were broadcast in October and November 1980. A second series of 10 episodes were broadcast between October and December 1981.

In August 1985, Cruickshank presented The Auld Alliance: A Personal View as part of the Saltire Society's Edinburgh Festival Fringe programme.

His final performance on the stage was as Justice Treadwell in Beyond Reasonable Doubt at the Queen's Theatre in 1987. His last appearance of any kind was at the age of 80, in the first episode ("Kicks") of series two of the ITV television production, King and Castle, which starred Nigel Planer and Derek Martin as partners in a debt collection agency, and in which Cruickshank played "Mr Hodinett". It was aired on 10 May 1988, just over a week after his death.

He was chair of the board of directors of Edinburgh Festival Fringe between 1970 and 1983.

== Personal life ==
He married actress Curigwen Lewis in 1939, and they had one son and two daughters.

== Theatre ==
Year	Title	Role	Company	Director	Notes
1982 & 1985	Ane Satyre of the Thrie Estaites	Abbot	Scottish Theatre Company	Tom Fleming	play by Sir David Lindsay, adapted by Robert Kemp

== Memorial ==
He has been immortalised in Milton Keynes, Buckinghamshire, by the naming of a road in his honour (Cruickshank Grove).

== Partial filmography ==
- Auld Lang Syne (1937) – Robert Burns
- The Mark of Cain (1947) – Sir Jonathon Dockwra
- The Idol of Paris (1948) – Prince Nicholas
- Forbidden (1949) – Inspector Baxter
- Paper Orchid (1949) – Inspector Clement Pill
- Your Witness (1950) – Sir Adrian Horth K.C. – Prosecutor
- The Angel with the Trumpet (1950) – Otto Alt
- The Reluctant Widow (1950) – Lord Bedlington
- Where No Vultures Fly (1951) – Governor (uncredited)
- The Cruel Sea (1953) – Scott Brown
- John Wesley (1954) – Trustee of Georgia
- John and Julie (1955) – Uncle Ben
- Richard III (1955) – Brackenbury
- The Secret Tent (1956) – Detective Inspector Thornton
- The Battle of the River Plate (1956) – Captain Stubbs – 'Doric Star'
- The Story of Esther Costello (1957) – Dr. Stein
- Innocent Sinners (1958) – Dr. Lynch-Cliffe
- A Question of Adultery (1958) – Dr. Cameron
- Kidnapped (1959) – Colin Campbell
- The 39 Steps (1959) – Sheriff
- The Stranglers of Bombay (1960) – Colonel Henderson
- There Was a Crooked Man (1960) – McKillup
- Greyfriars Bobby: The True Story of a Dog (1961) – Lord Provost
- El Cid (1961) – Count Gormaz
- Live Now – Pay Later (1962) – Vicar
- We Joined the Navy (1962) – Admiral Filmer
- Come Fly with Me (1963) – Cardwell
- Murder Most Foul (1964) – Justice Crosby
- Alibi For A Judge (1960) - Mr Justice Gerald Carstairs
- Wagner (1983) – Narrator
- Strangers and Brothers (1984) – M.H.L. Gay
- The Body in the Library (1984) – Conway Jefferson

== Publications ==
- Andrew Cruickshank: An Autobiography (1988) Weidenfeld & Nicolson, London.
