= Cloak & Dagger (1984 film) =

1984 film

- Theatrical release poster
- Directed by: Richard Franklin
- Screenplay by: Tom Holland
- Story by: Cornell Woolrich; Tom Holland
- Based on: "The Boy Cried Murder" by Cornell Woolrich
- Produced by: Allan Carr
- Starring: Henry Thomas; Dabney Coleman; Michael Murphy
- Cinematography: Victor J. Kemper
- Edited by: Andrew London
- Music by: Brian May
- Production company: Universal Pictures
- Distributed by: Universal Pictures
- Release dates: July 13, 1984 (with The Last Starfighter); August 10, 1984 (U.S.)
- Running time: 101 minutes
- Country: United States
- Language: English
- Box office: $9.7 million (US)

Cloak & Dagger is a 1984 American spy adventure film directed by Richard Franklin, and starring Henry Thomas, Dabney Coleman, and Michael Murphy. It was written by Tom Holland and based on a Cornell Woolrich short story, "The Boy Cried Murder", which had been filmed as The Window (1949). It was originally released in a double feature with The Last Starfighter on July 13, 1984, and was released separately on August 10, 1984. The film grossed $9.7 million in the United States. Thomas was nominated for the Young Artist Award for Best Actor.

== Plot ==
Eleven-year-old Davey Osborne lives in San Antonio, Texas. His father, Hal, is a military air traffic controller who has problems relating to Davey, especially in the wake of the death of Davey's mother/Hal's wife. Davey befriends Kim Gardener, a girl living nearby. Davey reveres Jack Flack, who is the main character of Cloak & Dagger, an espionage-themed role-playing game. Davey imagines Jack as a more dashing version of Hal. He wants to live an action-packed life like Jack, carrying around a water pistol as his "gun" and a softball as his "grenade". Davey spends much time playing the game and spending time with Jack as an imaginary friend.

One day, Davey's friend, Morris, who owns a game shop, sends Davey and Kim on an errand, where Davey witnesses a murder. Before dying, the victim gives Davey a Cloak & Dagger video game cartridge containing important military secrets that must be given to the FBI. Davey seeks help from the authorities, who do not believe him.

Spies murder Morris and then chase Davey across the city. Along the way, Jack helps Davey evade the pursuers. However, Davey's sense of morality and concern for Kim (whom the spies have kidnapped to try and blackmail Davey into handing over the cartridge) collide with Jack's harsh methods. While cornered by the spies along the River Walk, Jack urges Davey to lure two spies into the "Crossfire Gambit," causing one to kill the other. Jack convinces Davey to pick up the gun of a dead spy, but rather than shoot Dr. Rice, the spies' leader, Davey panics and runs away down a dead-end path. Rice corners Davey, taunting him. When Davey proves unwilling to shoot first, Jack tries to get Rice's attention. Standing in front of a blank wall (and holding his Agent-X bulletproof beret for protection), Jack dares Rice to shoot him. Davey looks to Jack, warning him not to do anything, and Rice turns and fires at the wall, thinking "Jack" is a hidden ally. Enraged, Davey fires his pistol, killing Rice.

Realizing that Jack had tricked him into shooting the spy, Davey discards the pistol, pulls the miniature of Jack out of his pocket and breaks it on the concrete. Blood begins to pour from the bullet holes that now riddle Jack's body, and he collapses. While regretting the rule, "...leaving when they stop believing", Jack confesses Davey was always his favorite playmate. Distracting Davey by asking for a smoke, Jack fades and vanishes. When Davey calls to Jack, saying he cannot do it alone, Jack's voice reassures him that he always could and tells him to save Kim.

Earlier, Davey had been befriended by an elderly couple who turn out to be enforcers allied with the spies. Davey escapes them, but without the cartridge, and chases the couple to the airport where they attempt to flee the country. At the airport, Davey pretends that they are his parents who are abandoning him. When security intervenes, Davey tells the guard the proof is the cartridge he knows they have. Cornered, the couple kidnap Davey and commandeer a plane, unaware that Davey has brought the bomb which the spies had planned to use to kill Kim. The spies request a pilot, and Hal, who has arrived at the airport with Kim's mother, volunteers to be the pilot. As the plane moves to the runway, Davey tries to summon Jack for help; his father hears him and identifies himself as "Jack Flack" and calls Davey to the cockpit. While preparing to escort him, the female enforcer discovers the bomb and panics, calling for her husband. Hal gets Davey out of the plane through the cockpit window. Davey runs after the plane down the runway, calling for his father, until the plane explodes, destroying the cartridge and the enforcers in the process. Then a figure appears and approaches him, looking like the silhouette of Jack Flack before revealing that it is his father. As the two embrace, Davey asks how he managed to escape. Hal replies, "Jack Flack always escapes".

Davey, joyful that his father is alive, realizes that his father is his true hero and has moved on from Jack. He declares, "I don't need him anymore. I got you, Dad".

== Cast ==
- Henry Thomas as Davey Osborne
- Dabney Coleman as Jack Flack/Hal Osborne
- Michael Murphy as Rice
- Christina Nigra as Kim Gardener
- Jeanette Nolan as Eunice MacCready
- John McIntire as George MacCready
- Eloy Casados as Alvarez
- Tim Rossovich as Haverman
- William Forsythe as Morris (billed as Bill Forsythe)
- Robert DoQui as Lt. Fleming
- Shelby Leverington as Marilyn Gardener
- Louie Anderson as Taxi Driver #2

== Production ==
Henry Thomas said the film was "pretty exciting ... It's got some violence in it. I get to fire a gun".

Principal photography went from August 8 to October 7, 1983. Filming took place in San Antonio, Texas, chosen because it was Thomas's hometown. The Alamo exterior was filmed on location, but they were not allowed to film inside, so they recreated the interior.

The film was written specifically for Henry Thomas as a follow-up to his success in E.T. Universal felt it was key to use Thomas' exceptional talent while he was young.

In a 2012 interview, Coleman recalled:

I thought it was a great idea. I didn't get along with the director [Richard Franklin]. He's since passed on, but he was... Well, I won't say that. But it was great working with that little kid. Henry Thomas. What a great kid. And a great actor. I'll tell you, though, it's amazing how many people have come up to me and said something to me about that film, including Timothy Bottoms... So Timothy came up to my table at Dan Tana's, where I was, uh, kind of a regular... Timothy says, "You don't know me from veal parmesan, but I just want to thank you for playing Jack Flack. You don't know what that movie means to my son and me". That happens to me two or three times a year. It's always either a father saying, "I saw that movie with my son", or a son saying, "I saw it with my dad". But then they say, "Seeing that movie was very important in my life". And that's always very nice to hear.

== Video game ==
Critical to the movie's plot is an Atari video game called Cloak & Dagger made for the Atari 5200. However, in reality Cloak & Dagger is an arcade-only game; no at-home consumer version existed prior to 2022, when the game was included in the compilation Atari 50. The illusion of Davey playing an Atari 5200 version was accomplished by outputting the signal from the arcade version into a television set. An Atari 5200 version was planned, but development on it never even started, due to Atari selling its consumer division to Jack Tramiel. The arcade game was under development with the title Agent X when the movie producers and Atari learned of each other's projects and decided to cooperate. This collaboration was part of a larger phenomenon of films featuring video games as critical plot elements (as with Tron and The Last Starfighter) and of video game tie-ins to the same films (as with the Tron games for the Intellivision and other platforms).

The arcade version was released in a limited run with 139 different machines.

== Reception ==
The film was released during the 1984 Summer Olympics. Universal said that the target audience of younger children would not be as interested in Olympics and the film would have less competition. The film grossed $9.7 million in the United States, $2.8 million of which came from its opening weekend.

Cloak & Dagger received a 67% approval rating on Rotten Tomatoes based on 12 reviews, with an average rating of 5.8/10. On her review, Janet Maslin of The New York Times praised Franklin's direction, as well as the performances of Thomas and Coleman. Metacritic gave the film a score of 64 based on 7 reviews, indicating "generally favorable" reviews.

Neil Gaiman reviewed Cloak & Dagger for Imagine magazine, and stated that "director Richard Franklin's fascination with Alfred Hitchcock continues; and echoes, lines and themes of Hitchcock films crop up all through this engaging and enjoyable film".

In the 1996 movie guide "Seen That, Now What?", the film was given the rating of "B+", stating "Tight script, quick pace and light but not moronic tone makes this the rare entry that can be responsibly called family fare".

== Other adaptations ==
The Woolrich's story has been adapted three other times:

- The Window (1949)
- The Boy Cried Murder (1966)
- Eyewitness (1970)
