= Olwen Brookes =

English actress (1901–1976)

Olwen Edna Jones
- in Ghost Squad (1963)
- Born: 26 November 1901; Chelsea, London, England
- Died: 17 September 1976 (aged 74); Kensington, London, England
- Occupation: Actress
- Years active: 1934–70

Olwen Brookes (26 November 1901 – 17 September 1976) was an English actress, known for An Inspector Calls, The Happiest Days of Your Life and The First Night of Pygmalion. Her career spanned over a quarter of a century, and as well as stage work, included 29 films and 25 television appearances.

== Filmography ==
- Men of Rochdale (Short) (1944) - Mrs. Clackman
- Caesar and Cleopatra (1945) - Slave Girl (uncredited)
- This Man Is Mine (1946) - Spinster (uncredited)
- The Mark of Cain (1947) - Mrs. Fisher (uncredited)
- My Sister and I (1948) - Mrs. Lippincott
- Warning to Wantons (1949) - (uncredited)
- Stop Press Girl (1949) - Hotel Receptionist (uncredited)
- Poet's Pub (1949) - Bridge Player (uncredited)
- Choir Practice (1949, TV film) - Mrs. Davies
- Trottie True (1949) - Lady Talman (uncredited)
- Obsession (1949) -
- The Happiest Days of Your Life (1950) - Mrs. Parry
- Appointment with Venus (1951) - F.A.N.Y.
- Nocturne in Scotland (1951, TV film) - Princess Marceline Czartoyska
- Something Money Can't Buy (1952) - Lady at party
- Valley of Song (1953) - (uncredited)
- An Inspector Calls (1954) - Miss Francis
- The Black Knight (1954) - Lady Ontzlake
- Dixon of Dock Green (1955-1964, TV Series) - Mrs. Randall / Mrs. Iver / Mrs. Ross / Mrs. Manton / Mrs. Welsh / Miss Braithwaite / Mrs. Cunningham
- The Gentle Touch (1956) - Other Sister
- Women Without Men (1956) - Hackett (uncredited)
- Life Without Lyons (1956, TV Series)
- High Terrace (1956) - Mother Superior
- Ivor Novello (1956, TV film)
- The Good Companions (1957) - Woman on Tram
- After the Ball (1957) - Housekeeper
- A Night to Remember (1958) - Miss Evans (uncredited)
- Jack the Ripper (1959) - Lady Almoner
- Left Right and Centre (1959) - Right - Mrs. Samson
- Dancers in The Mourning (1959, TV series) - Miss Finbrough
- Don't Do It Dempsey (1960, TV Series) - Miss Twine
- Whack-O! (1960, TV Series) - Secretary
- Emergency Ward 10 (1960, TV Series) - Mrs. Gregory
- The Citadel (1960, TV Mini-Series) - Mrs. Morgan Senior
- Jango (1961, TV Series) - Mrs. Bellew
- ITV Play of the Week (1961, TV Series) - Mrs. Watkins
- The Six Pound Walkers (1961, TV Series) - Mrs. Tindall
- Twice Round the Daffodils (1962) - Dorothy's mother
- Tales of Mystery (1962, TV Series) - Mrs. Peters
- Young and Willing (1962) - Miss Potter (uncredited)
- No Hiding Place (1962-1963, TV Series) - Mrs. Pike / Women's prison officer
- Ghost Squad (1963, TV Series) - Miss Reeves
- 80,000 Suspects (1963) - Senior Nursing Officer (uncredited)
- Taxi! (1963-1964, TV Series) - Mrs. Stephens / Hotel Receptionist
- The Wednesday Play (1965, TV Series) - Woman at the races
- Devils of Darkness (1965) - Landlady
- Compact (1965, TV Series) - Mrs. Bunny
- The Forsyte Saga (1967, TV Mini-Series) - Bilson
- Honey Lane (1967, TV Series) - Customer
- Eye of the Devil (1967) - Party Guest (uncredited)
- Sexton Blake (1968, TV Series) - Miss Cranber
- The First Night of Pygmalion (1969, TV film) - Edith Lyttleton
- The Culture Vultures (1970, TV Series) - Dora
- On the Run (1971) - Miss Fisher (final film role)
