= Hidden Homicide =

1959 British film by Anthony Young

- Theatrical release poster
- Directed by: Tony Young
- Screenplay by: Bill Luckwell; Anthony Young
- Based on: Death at Shinglestrand by Paul Capon
- Produced by: Bill Luckwell; Derek Winn
- Starring: Griffith Jones; Patricia Laffan; James Kenney; Bruce Seton; Peter Carver; Danny Green
- Cinematography: Ernest Palmer
- Edited by: John Ferris
- Music by: William Trytel
- Production companies: Bill and Michael Luckwell Films
- Distributed by: Rank Film Distributors; Republic Pictures (US)
- Release date: 25 February 1959
- Running time: 71 minutes
- Country: United Kingdom
- Language: English

Hidden Homicide is a 1959 British 'B' mystery film directed by Tony Young and starring Griffith Jones, Patricia Laffan, James Kenney, Bruce Seton, Peter Carver and Danny Green. It was written by Bill Luckwell and Young, based on the 1951 novel Death at Shinglestrand by Paul Capon. It was released on 25 February 1959 by Rank Film Distributors.

== Preservation status ==
The British Film Institute National Archive holds a collection of ephemera and stills but no film or video materials.

== Plot ==
Writer Michael Cornforth wakes up in a strange house in the countryside – fully clothed and holding a gun. On investigating, he discovers his cousin's dead body in the kitchen, and soon finds himself accused of murder.

== Cast ==
- Griffith Jones as Michael Cornforth
- Patricia Laffan as Jean Gilson
- James Kenney as Oswald Castellan
- Bruce Seton as Bill Dodd
- Peter Carver as Wally Gizzard
- Danny Green as Cliff Darby
- Charles Farrell as Mungo Peddy
- John Moore as the stranger
- Richard Shaw as Wright
- Robert Raglan as Ashbury
- Maya Koumani as Marian Savage
- David Chivers as the chemist
- Norman Wynne as the innkeeper
- Frank Hawkins as Ben Leacock
- Jan Wilson as porter
- Joe Wadham as Marshall
- John Watson as policeman

== Production ==
The movie was shot at Merton Park in November 1957.

== Critical reception ==
Kinematograph Weekly wrote "The picture gets around, but moves in shabby and fantastic circles. Griffith Jones doesn’t know whether he’s coming or going as Michael, Patricia Laffan makes an incredibly trusting Jean, and James Kenney takes on far more than he can chew as Castellan, Kate and Mrs. Dodge, a 'char,' but Bruce Seton is not too bad as Dodd. The love angle stretches credulity to breaking point, and even its in-the-nick-of-time climax misfires. The staging is not so hot, either."

The Monthly Film Bulletin wrote: "After an intriguing start, this romantic 'whodunnit' collapses under clumsy development, involving a strained exercise in female impersonation from James Kenney and a particularly far-fetched dénouement."
