= Auld Lang Syne (1937 film) =

1937 British film by James A. FitzPatrick

- Opening titles
- Directed by: James A. FitzPatrick
- Written by: W.K. Williamson
- Produced by: James A. FitzPatrick
- Starring: Andrew Cruickshank; Christine Adrian; Richard Ross; Marian Spencer
- Cinematography: Hone Glendinning
- Edited by: Ross Patton
- Music by: Gideon Fagan
- Production company: FitzPatrick Pictures
- Distributed by: Metro-Goldwyn-Mayer
- Release date: February 1937
- Running time: 72 minutes
- Country: United Kingdom
- Language: English

Auld Lang Syne is a 1937 British historical drama film directed by James A. FitzPatrick and starring Andrew Cruickshank, Christine Adrian and Marian Spencer. It was written by W.K. WIlliamson, and was made as a quota quickie, produced at Shepperton Studios for distribution by MGM; quota costume films were rare, as the costs generally exceeded the limited budgets allowed for productions.

== Preservation status ==
The British Film Institute National Archive holds no stills or ephemera, and no film or video materials.

== Plot ==
The film portrays the life of the eighteenth century Scottish poet Robert Burns.

== Cast ==
- Andrew Cruickshank as Robert Burns
- Christine Adrian as Jean Armour
- Richard Ross as Gavin Hamilton
- Marian Spencer as Clarinda
- Malcolm Graham as Gilbert Burns
- Doris Palette as Highland Mary
- Jenny Laird as Alison Begbie
- Ernest Templeton as Elder MacIntosh
- Charles Howard as Mr. Burns
- Anne Wilson as Agnes Burns
- Lina Naseby as Mrs. Burns
- Winifred Willard as Jessie
- Kate Agnew as Mrs. Armour
- Frank Sutherland as Mr. Armour
- Jock Rae as Mr. McNab
- Vi Kaley as Mrs. McNab
- Frank Webster as sailor
- Anita Graham as Mrs. Dunlap

== Reception ==
The Monthly Film Bulletin wrote: "The story is told with extraordinary ingenuousness. It is naive almost beyond belief. When, at the beginning, Robert meets a girl in the glen they immediately burst into song. Every subsequent incident is preluded or punctuated by recitation or song. The dialogue is stilted, and the Scottish accent imposes a severe strain on many of the cast. Andrew Cruickshank gives a portrait of the poet which would not be recognised as such by students of his life and works."

Kine Weekly wrote: "Robert Burns, most popular and likeable of Scotland's bards, is the subject of this unpretentious picture, and although the portrait is not presented without bias, it is sufficiently true in outline to combine educational value with agreeable period entertainment. The price of genius is the crux of the play, and this is clearly stressed by the competent and lifelike acting of Andrew Cruickshank and sympathetic direction."

The Daily Film Renter wrote: "Sincere and straightforward version of poet's rise, triumph and decline, with frequent musical accompaniment of Burns's own songs. Performances quite competent, and photography and direction adequate, while treatment of theme, though distinctly sentimentalised, should appeal to lovers of the now traditional songs."
