= The Royal African Rifles =

1953 film by Lesley Selander

- Original film poster
- Directed by: Lesley Selander
- Written by: Daniel B. Ullman
- Produced by: Richard V. Heermance
- Starring: Louis Hayward; Veronica Hurst; Michael Pate
- Cinematography: Ellis W. Carter
- Edited by: Walter Hannemann
- Music by: Paul Dunlap
- Production companies: Allied Artists Pictures; Associated Film Artists
- Distributed by: Allied Artists Pictures
- Release date: September 27, 1953
- Running time: 75 minutes
- Country: United States
- Language: English

The Royal African Rifles is a 1953 American Cinecolor First World War adventure film directed by Lesley Selander and starring Louis Hayward, Veronica Hurst and Michael Pate. It is set in British East Africa but filmed on location in the Los Angeles County Arboretum and Botanic Garden. The film was the first production of Louis Hayward's production company Associated Film Artists, but Hayward's company made no other films. It was distributed by Allied Artists. The working title was The Queen’s African Rifles. In reality, there was never a military unit called “The Royal African Rifles”, although the King's African Rifles served in Africa during the war. The film was retitled Storm Over Africa in the United Kingdom.

== Plot ==
In August 1914, a consignment of Vickers machine guns are stolen off a Royal Navy ship, HMS Marlin. An RN Lieutenant aboard the ship goes undercover as a white hunter through British East Africa to find the weapons before they get into the hands of the Germans and alter the balance of power in Africa.

== Cast ==
- Louis Hayward as Lt. James Denham RN
- Veronica Hurst as Jennifer Cunningham
- Michael Pate as Bill Cunningham
- Steven Geray as Franz Van Stede
- Angela Greene as Karen Van Stede
- Bruce Lester as Saxon
- Barry Bernard as Eakins
- Robert Osterloh as Carney
- Roy Glenn as Cpl. John
- John Warburton as Col. Burke
- Patrick Aherne as Capt. Curtis
- Juanita Moore as Elderly Woman
- Woody Strode as Soldier
