= The Boy Cried Murder =

1966 British film by George P. Breakston

- Theatrical release poster
- Directed by: George P. Breakston
- Written by: Robin Estridge; Cornell Woolrich
- Screenplay by: Robin Estridge
- Based on: "The Boy Cried Murder" by Cornell Woolrich
- Produced by: Artur Brauner; Philip N. Krasne
- Starring: Fraser MacIntosh; Veronica Hurst; Phil Brown; Tim Barrett
- Cinematography: Milorad Markovic
- Edited by: Milanka Nanovic
- Music by: Martin Slavin
- Production companies: Avala Film; Carlos; Central Cinema Company Film
- Distributed by: British Lion Films
- Release date: 1966
- Running time: 86 minutes
- Countries: United Kingdom; West Germany; Yugoslavia
- Language: English

The Boy Cried Murder is a 1966 British-West German-Yugoslav thriller film directed by George P. Breakston and starring Fraser MacIntosh, Veronica Hurst, and Phil Brown. The film is based on the novelette of the same name by Cornell Woolrich. The movie is a remake of the 1949 film The Window.

== Plot ==
A twelve-year-old boy is disappointed by the fact that his mother brought a stepfather to their house. He constantly tries to distance himself from the man, inventing various stories, and is punished for doing so. While on vacation in Yugoslavia, his parents leave on a boat trip without him, and the boy accidentally witnesses a real murder. Later on, he tells this to his parents, but because of his previous behaviour, they do not believe him. However, this is not the whole trouble. The murderer has seen an unexpected witness of his crime, and now he wants to get rid of the boy.

== Cast ==
- Tim Barrett as Mike
- Phil Brown as Tom Durrant
- Veronica Hurst as Clare Durrant
- Beba Loncar as Susie
- Frazer MacIntosh as Jonathan Durrant
- Alex MacIntosh as Sergeant
- Edward Steel as Col. Wetherall
- Anita Sharp-Bolster as Mrs. Wetherall
- Sonja Hlebs as Marianne
- Vuka Dundjerovic as Mrs. Bosnic

== See also ==
The story has been adapted three more times:

- The Window (1949)
- Eyewitness (1970)
- Cloak & Dagger (1984)
