= Joseph Bato =

Hungarian art director (1888–1966)

- Born: 15 October 1888; Budapest, Austro-Hungarian Empire
- Died: 1966 (aged 77–78); London, United Kingdom
- Other name: Josef Bato
- Occupations: Art director, costume designer
- Years active: 1943–1960 (film)

Joseph Bato (1888–1966) was a Hungarian artist. He fled Germany following the Nazi takeover due to his Jewish heritage and settled in London where he was employed as an art director and costume designer in the British film industry. He worked for London Films on a number of productions including the 1949 film The Third Man.

== Selected filmography ==
- Bonnie Prince Charlie (1948)
- The Third Man (1949)
- The Elusive Pimpernel (1950)
- The Happiest Days of Your Life (1950)
- Lady Godiva Rides Again (1951)
- The Wonder Kid (1952)
- The Sound Barrier (1952)
- The Story of Gilbert and Sullivan (1953)
- The Intruder (1953)
- The Heart of the Matter (1953)
- The Belles of St. Trinian's (1954)
- An Inspector Calls (1954)
- The Deep Blue Sea (1955)
- Raising a Riot (1955)
- They Can't Hang Me (1956)
- Blue Murder at St. Trinian's (1957)
- The Diplomatic Corpse (1958)

== Bibliography ==
- Evans, Peter William. Carol Reed. Manchester University Press, 2005.
- Phillips, Gene. Beyond the Epic: The Life and Films of David Lean. University Press of Kentucky, 2006.
