= John Dalzell Kenworthy =

Cumbrian Artist

John Dalzell Kenworthy ARCA (5 Nov 1858 - 4 Mar 1954) was an internationally acclaimed artist, sculptor and writer who was born at Whitehaven into a prominent West Cumbrian family.

== Life ==
JD Kenworthy was a noted Cumberland artist, who lived at Seacroft House, St Bees, a coastal village south of Whitehaven. He painted both portraits and landscapes, in oil and watercolour in the 50 years centred on the turn of the twentieth century. He was an associate of the Royal Cambrian Academy (1914) and he exhibited at the Royal Academy in London, as well as at galleries across Manchester, Leeds and Liverpool. He travelled to paint in Scotland and France, where he became particularly well known. He also was a keen angler, and wrote a book in 1933 called 'Fisherman's Philosophy', in which he discusses Scottish salmon and loch trout, and fishing on the French Mediterranean coast. Kenworthy's works are held in the public collections of the Beacon Museum and Helena Thompson Museum. He was a Justice of the Peace (1919) and President of the West Cumberland Club and Whitehaven Art Club (1948).

== Paintings ==
JD Kenworthy's portraits include two of 1st World War veterans, AJ Wandless a Master Mariner and Whitehaven war hero Abraham Acton. He also painted portraits of other notable people, including the Mayor of Whitehaven, Reverend Rees Keene, Dr James Irving Lace, Justices of the Peace James Gibson Dees and Alderman Joseph Braithwaite and one of the aero chocolate girls Rosina Bacharach née Grispo. He also painted his housekeeper Mrs Elizabeth Dixon and a local school girl Dorothy Shackley. Amongst his landscape paintings is a painting called the Potato Harvest and several Scottish landscape views including one of Loch Ederline, near Ford Argyll, which unsurprisingly has a good reputation for fishing.

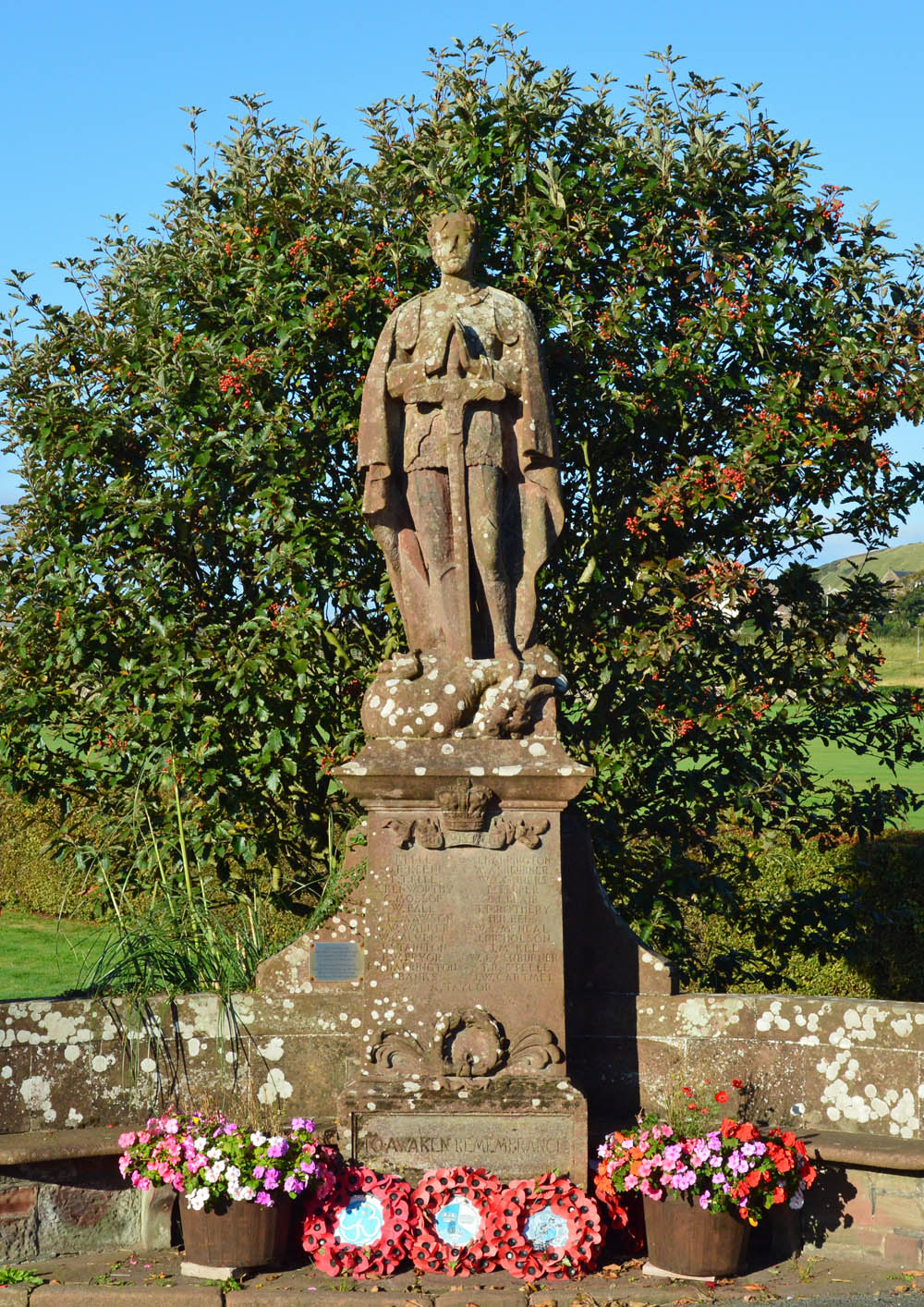
St George and the Dragon, the War memorial at St Bees Railway station. Designed by local artist J D Kenworthy.

== St. Bees War Memorial ==
W.G. Collingwood, who had been John Ruskin's secretary drew up a design for a memorial based upon the old cross shaft in the Priory graveyard. This design was used for the official Village memorial by the Lych Gate. However, J.D. Kenworthy of Seacroft, who had lost his eldest son in the War, thought that memorial lacked impact and was in the wrong place, so the second village war memorial was designed and erected near the railway station in the centre of the village by J.D. Kenworthy. It is made of St Bees red sandstone hewed from a local quarry. This memorial shows the Patron Saint of England, St George standing on top of the dragon that, according to tradition, he had conquered. This memorial lists the names of 27 villagers who died in the 1st World War (i.e. one more than Collingwood's memorial). At the base of the memorial sculpture is the following inscription reinforcing J.D. Kenworthy's reasoning for the second memorial: "To Awaken Remembrance". The ceremony took place in August 1923. Today both are looked after by the Parish Council as village war memorials.

== Personal life ==
JD Kenworthy was the third of six children of George Williams Kenworthy and Sarah Dalzell. He married Dinah Towerson née Porter in 1883. They had three children, Stanley, Gordon and Laura. His eldest son, Captain Stanley Kenworthy (2nd Manchester Pals later 17th Regiment) was killed in World War I. Captain Kenworthy died on the 1st of July 1916, the first day of the Battle of the Somme at Montauban-de-Picardie, where he is buried.
