= Leonard Sachs =

South African-British actor (1909–1990)

- Born: Leonard Meyer Sachs; 26 September 1909; Roodepoort, Transvaal Colony
- Died: 15 June 1990 (aged 80); Westminster, London, England
- Occupation: Actor
- Years active: 1936–1983
- Spouse: Eleanor Summerfield (m. 1947)
- Children: 2, including Robin

Leonard Meyer Sachs (26 September 1909 – 15 June 1990) was a South African-British actor.

== Life and career ==
Sachs was born in the town of Roodepoort, in the then Transvaal Colony, present day South Africa. He was Jewish. He emigrated to the United Kingdom in 1929 and had many television and film roles from the 1930s to the 1980s, including Mowbray in the 1950 BBC Television version of Richard II, John Wesley in the 1954 film of the same name and Lord Mount Severn in East Lynne from 1976.

He founded an Old Time Music Hall, named the Players' Theatre, in Villiers Street, Charing Cross, London. He appeared as the Chairman of the Leeds City Varieties in the long-running BBC television series The Good Old Days, which ran from 1953 to 1983, and became known for his elaborate, sesquipedalian introductions of the performers. Sachs was honoured in a 1977 episode of This Is Your Life.

Sachs appeared in Danger Man with Patrick McGoohan. He had two appearances in the science fiction series Doctor Who: as Admiral Gaspard de Coligny in The Massacre of St Bartholomew's Eve in 1966 and as Lord President Borusa in Arc of Infinity in 1983. He appeared in the 1985 Royal Variety Performance in a tribute to The Good Old Days.

== Personal life ==
Sachs married the actress Eleanor Summerfield in 1947. The couple had two sons, including Robin Sachs and Toby Sachs. In January 1984, Sachs was fined £75 for "importuning men for an immoral purpose" at Notting Hill Gate tube station. Sachs died from kidney failure on 15 June 1990 in Westminster, London, at the age of 80.

== Selected filmography ==
- The Secret of Stamboul (1936) – Arif
- State Secret (1950) – Dr Poldoi
- The Story of Gilbert and Sullivan (1953) – Smythe
- John Wesley (1954) – John Wesley
- Malaga (1954) – Paul Dupont
- The Men of Sherwood Forest (1954) – Sheriff of Nottingham
- Gentlemen Marry Brunettes (1955) – M. Dufy
- Count of Twelve (1955) – Mark Dyson (episode "Blind Man's Bluff")
- The Gamma People (1956) – Telegraph Clerk
- Odongo (1956) – Game Warden
- Face in the Night (1957) – Victor
- After the Ball (1957) – Richard Warner
- Seven Thunders (1957) – German Officer (uncredited)
- Man from Tangier (1957) – Heinrich
- The Man Who Wouldn't Talk (1958) – Professor Horvard
- Behemoth the Sea Monster (1959) – Scientist
- The Dover Road Mystery (1960) – Herbert Roberts
- Beyond the Curtain (1960) – Waiter
- Oscar Wilde (1960) – Richard Legallienne
- The Siege of Sidney Street (1960) – Svaars (uncredited)
- The Bulldog Breed (1960) – Yachtsman (uncredited)
- Five Golden Hours (1961) – Mr Morini
- Konga (1961) – Bob's Father
- Taste of Fear (1961) – Mr. Spratt
- Pit of Darkness (1961) – Clifton Conrad
- Bomb in the High Street (1961) – Freeling
- Locker Sixty-Nine (1962) – Spencer
- She Knows Y'Know (1962) – John Dawson
- Number Six (1962) – Welland
- Freud: The Secret Passion (1962) – Brouhardier
- Stranglehold (1963) – The Dutchman
- Panic (1963) – Len Collier
- The Amorous Adventures of Moll Flanders (1965) – Prison doctor
- Thunderball (1965) – Group Captain Pritchard
- Once Is Not Enough (1975) – Dr Peterson
