= John Wesley (film) =

- Directed by: Norman Walker
- Screenplay by: Lawrence Barrett
- Produced by: Clifford Jeapes
- Starring: Leonard Sachs; Neil Heayes; Keith Pyott
- Cinematography: Hone Glendinning
- Edited by: Duncan Spence; David Powell (as Dave Powell)
- Music by: Henry Reed
- Production companies: G.H.W. Productions; Radio and Film Commission of the Methodist Church in co-operation with J.Arthur Rank
- Distributed by: General Film Distributors (UK)
- Release date: 20 April 1954 (US)
- Running time: 77 minutes
- Country: United Kingdom
- Language: English

John Wesley (also known as The Life of John Wesley) is a 1954 British historical semi-documentary film directed by Norman Walker and starring Leonard Sachs, Neil Heayes and Keith Pyott. It was written by Lawrence Barrett and produced by G.H.W. Productions for the Radio and Film Commission of the Methodist Church in co-operation with J.Arthur Rank. The film depicts the life of the father of Methodism, John Wesley.

== Premise ==
Rescued from a burning house as a child, John Wesley believes the experience marked him for a higher purpose, a "brand from the burning." The film follows Wesley's years at Oxford and as a clergyman, his disagreements with the church over the social position of the clergy, his mission to America, the founding of Methodism, and his bringing of the Gospel into the lives of ordinary people.

== Cast ==
- Leonard Sachs as John Wesley
- Gerard Lohan as Wesley as a child
- Neil Heayes as Wesley as a student
- Keith Pyott as Rev. Samuel Wesley
- Curigwen Lewis as Susannah Wesley
- John Witty as Peter Bohler
- Derek Aylward as Charles Wesley
- Patrick Barton as George Whitefield
- John Slater as condemned man
- Philip Leaver as Beau Nash
- Joss Ambler as Trustee of Georgia
- Andrew Cruickshank as Trustee of Georgia
- Horace Sequiera as Trustee of Georgia
- Sydney Moncton as Trustee of Georgia
- Erik Chitty as Trustee of Georgia
- George Bishop as Trustee of Georgia
- Milton Rosmer as Trustee of Georgia
- Henry Hewitt as Bishop of Bristol
- Patrick Holt as Thomas Maxfield
- Arthur Young as King George II
- Vincent Holman as Beaumont, a Quaker
- Edward Jewesbury as James Hutton
- Julien Mitchell as Tom Dekkar
- Harry Towb as Michael O'Rory
- Neal Arden as William Holland
- F.B.J. Sharp as vicar
- Roger Maxwell as General Holt
- Roddy Hughes as Mr. Bligh

== Production ==
The film was financed by J. Arthur Rank, a prominent Methodist layman, and with contributions from the Methodist church. Nicolas Roeg was assistant cameraman.

== Critical reception ==
Variety wrote: "Birth of the Methodist movement in 18th century England is dramatically chronicled in this semi-documentary film that's based upon some of the high points in the long career of John Wesley – churchman, educator and evangelist. In many respects, the picture is similar to Martin Luther which the Louis de Rochemont Organization produced for the Lutheran Church. But where "Luther" is winning wide theatrical distribution and stout grosses under careful salesmanship of the de Rochemont outfit, "Wesley" won't tap such a market for some time. For, it's understood, some 500 churches which contributed toward the $200,000 production cost received "first-run" privileges over a period of months. Until this situation is resolved, it's unknown whether theatrical release will be arranged if at all. ... Subject matter is often dry and wordy. There is no sex or comic relief, and wasn't any in Wesley's dedicated life. Accent is entirely Wesley and his untiring devotion to his principles. The serious-minded will find the theme a refreshing and enlightening one."

Allmovie wrote, "The budget didn't allow for a professional cast, thus many potentially worthwhile scenes are laid low by amateurish acting. On the other hand, the film is quite slick and accomplished on a technical level, thanks to the first-rate cinematography of Hone Glendenning and the assured direction of Norman Walker."

TV Guide gave the film three out of five stars, noting, "This handsomely mounted biography of the title Methodist leader was originally conceived as a short black-and-white film, but was expanded to include more of Wesley's life and work... The plot is minimal, focusing on the young Wesley's studies and the development of his principles, but the production values are excellent and Leonard Sachs' Wesley is superb. The initial release of the film went to some 500 churches that contributed to the $200,000 budget in return for first rights on viewing."
