= Don't Blame the Stork =

1954 British film by Ákos Ráthonyi

- Theatrical release poster
- Directed by: Ákos Ráthonyi
- Written by: Victor Katona; Talbot Rothwell; Wolfgang Wilhelm
- Produced by: David Dent; Victor Katona
- Starring: Veronica Hurst; Ian Hunter; Reginald Beckwith
- Cinematography: Stanley Pavey
- Edited by: Lito Carruthers
- Production company: David Dent Productions
- Distributed by: Adelphi Films
- Release date: 1 January 1954
- Running time: 80 minutes
- Country: United Kingdom
- Language: English

Don't Blame the Stork (also known as No Bed of Her Own) is a 1954 British second feature ('B') comedy film directed by Ákos Ráthonyi and starring Veronica Hurst, Ian Hunter, Reginald Beckwith, and Patricia Laffan. It was written by Victor Katona, Talbot Rothwell and Wolfgang Wilhelm based on a story by E. Silas.

The film was adapted from an earlier German comedy film. It was shot at Walton Studios with sets designed by the art director Ivan King.

== Plot ==
A famous actor publicly declares that he loves babies, and soon a baby is left on his doorstep. As he is forced to take care of it, Katie O’Connor, an unsuccessful but stage-struck actress, pretends to be the child’s mother in order to live in the actor's house and to prove that she is a competent performer.

== Cast ==
- Veronica Hurst as Katie O'Connor
- Ian Hunter as Sir George Redway
- Reginald Beckwith as Jonathan
- Patricia Laffan as Lilian Angel
- Brenda de Banzie as Evelyn Steele
- Harry Fowler as Harry Fenn
- Thora Hird as Agnes O'Connor
- Mark Daly as Michael O'Connor
- Howard Marion-Crawford as Fluffy Faversham
- Avril Angers as Renee O'Connor

== Reception ==
The Monthly Film Bulletin wrote: "Typical farce material, played in the most preposterous farce manner. The following is representative of the standard of humour: 'Chubby little face, hasn't it?' 'It's the wrong end, sir!"

The Daily Film Renter wrote: "It's direction is glossy and capable and it's acting brisk and accomplished."

Picture Show wrote: "Veronica Hurst gives a versatile and high-spirited performance as the young actress and Ian Hunter acts with dignity his role of the harassed actors."

TV Guide gave the film one star out of five, calling the film, a "dull comedy with little to recommend it."
