= Danny Masterton =

Scottish footballer (1954–2020)

Personal information
- Full name: Daniel Masterton
- Date of birth: 5 September 1954
- Place of birth: Ayr, Scotland
- Date of death: 5 January 2020 (aged 65)
- Position: Striker

Senior career*
Years	Team	Apps	(Gls)
1976–1980	Ayr United	81	(21)
1980–1984	Clyde	125	(67)
1984–1985	Queen of the South	1	(0)
Total		207	(88)
- * Club domestic league appearances and goals

Daniel Masterton (5 September 1954 – 5 January 2020) was a Scottish footballer, who played as a striker.

Masterton was from Muirkirk, Ayrshire. He began his career with Ayr United, before moving to Clyde, where he enjoyed the best spell of his career. He had a good scoring record at Clyde, scoring 67 goals in 125 games. He had a short spell at Queen of the South before retiring.

Masterton died on 5 January 2020.
