= Veronica Hurst =

British actress (1931–2022)

- Hurst in Angels One Five, 1952
- Born: Patricia Veronica Wilmshurst; 11 November 1931; Malta
- Died: 15 November 2022 (aged 91); Denville Hall, London
- Education: Royal Academy of Dramatic Art
- Occupation: Actress
- Years active: 1951–1983
- Known for: RADA scholar, securing a film contract at 17 to become a British light leading lady in 1950s and 1960s films.
- Spouses: William Sylvester (m. 1955; div. 1966) Ian Fordyce (m. 1966; div. 1974)

Veronica Patricia Hurst (born Patricia Wilmshurst; 11 November 1931 – 15 November 2022) was a British film, stage and television actress. Hurst was born in Malta and brought up in Tooting, London. She settled in Wimbledon before entering Denville Hall, the residential home for professional actors over the age of 70.

== Early career ==
Hurst was awarded the Leverhulme Scholarship to RADA and made her film debut as Joan Webb in Laughter in Paradise (1951) with director Mario Zampi describing her as "one of the greatest potential screen stars I have ever seen". The film featured Alastair Sim, Fay Compton and Guy Middleton. She was then contracted to the Associated British Picture Corporation for seven years. In 1952, she appeared in the critically acclaimed Battle of Britain film Angels One Five, directed by George More O'Ferrall and starring alongside Jack Hawkins and John Gregson.

In one of her most popular roles, as Kitty Murray in The Maze (1953), she was on loan to Allied Artists. The Maze was based on a novel by Maurice Sandoz and directed by William Cameron Menzies. Hurst, then 21, co-starred with Richard Carlson. They were supported by Hillary Brooke and Lilian Bond, among others. Like It Came from Outer Space, The Maze is a cult film and helped introduce the 3D film to film audiences.

== Films ==
Allied Artists retained Hurst for a second film, The Royal African Rifles (1953). Her second American feature was directed by Lesley Selander and had a screenplay by Daniel Ullman. Hurst played the daughter of a traitor who assists in smuggling German arms to British East Africa during World War I. Some of her other film credits include The Yellow Balloon (1953), Will Any Gentleman...? (1953), Bang! You're Dead (1954), Don't Blame The Stork (1954), The Gilded Cage (1955), Peeping Tom (1960), Dead Man's Evidence (1962), Live It Up (1963), Licensed to Kill (1965) and The Boy Cried Murder (1965).

== Television ==
Hurst appeared in fifteen films in the 1950s and '60s. By the early 1960s she began to act frequently in both British and American television series. She had roles in The Pursuers (1961), Public Eye (1966), The Baron (1967), Man in a Suitcase (1968), Detective (1968), Market in Honey Lane (1967), The Troubleshooters (1969), Fraud Squad (1970), The Persuaders! (1971), Dixon of Dock Green (1968–71), The Flaxton Boys (1971), and General Hospital (1972–75).

== Death ==
Hurst died on 15 November 2022, just four days after her 91st birthday. Her last screen appearance was an interview with Talking Pictures TV that year, which left a tribute after the programme announcing her death.

== Filmography ==
- Laughter in Paradise (1951)
- Angels One Five (1952)
- The Maze (1953)
- The Yellow Balloon (1953)
- Will Any Gentleman...? (1953)
- Storm Over Africa (1953)
- The Girl on the Pier (1953)
- Don't Blame the Stork (1954)
- Bang! You're Dead (1954)
- The Gilded Cage (1955)
- Peeping Tom (1960)
- Dead Man's Evidence (1962)
- Live It Up! (1963)
- Licensed to Kill (1965)
- The Boy Cried Murder (1966)

== Television ==
- BBC Sunday Night Theatre – (Episode: "Caesar's Wife") (1951)
- The Venus of Bainsville (1952) (TV Movie)
- The Three Musketeers (1954)
- ITV Television Playhouse – (Episode: "To Dorothy, a Son") (1956)
- Wire Service – (Episode: "Atom at Spithead") (1957)
- Knight Errant Limited – (Episodes: "Man on the Pier"/ "Never More the Raven") (1960–1961)
- The Persuers – (Episodes: "Breakout"/ "The Hunt") (1961)
- Riviera Police – (Episode: "Here Comes a Point") (1965)
- Public Eye – (Episode: "It Had To Be a Mouse") (1966)
- Love Story – (Episode: "Barefoot and in the Kitchen") (1966)
- Coronation Street (1 Episode) (1966)
- No Hiding Place – (Episodes: "You Don't Think Twice"/ "A Through and Through with Powder") (1966–1967)
- Turn Out the Lights (Episode: "The Happy Medium") (1967)
- The Baron – (Episode: "The High Terrace") (1967)
- Seven Deadly Virtues – (Episode: "Surface of Innocence") (1967)
- Market in Honey Lane (3 episodes, 1967, 1969)
- Sexton Blake – (Episodes: "The Invicta Ray") (1968)
- Man in a Suitcase – (Episode: "Which Way Did He Go, McGill?") (1968)
- Detective – (Episode: "The Golden Dart") (1968)
- Dixon of Dock Green – (Episode: "Number 13") (1968)
- The Troubleshooters – (Episode: "A Very Special Relationship") (1969)
- Who-Dun-It – (Episode: "A High Class Death") (1969)
- Dixon of Dock Green – (Episode: "Breaking Point") (1969)
- Fraud Squad – (Episode: "Remission-Negative") (1970)
- Crime of Passion – (Episode: "Louis") (1971)
- The Persuaders! – (Episode: "Take Seven") (1971)
- Dixon of Dock Green – (Episode: "The Man from the Ministry") (1971)
- The Flaxton Boys (1971)
- New Scotland Yard – (Episode: "Fire in a Honey Pot") (1972)
- Late Night Theatre – (4 Episodes – "Steely Jack"/ "Death to the General"/ "The Kong Ting Ruby"/ "The Gypsy's Revenge") (1972–1973)
- General Hospital (1973–1975)
