= Patricia Laffan =

British actress (1919–2014)

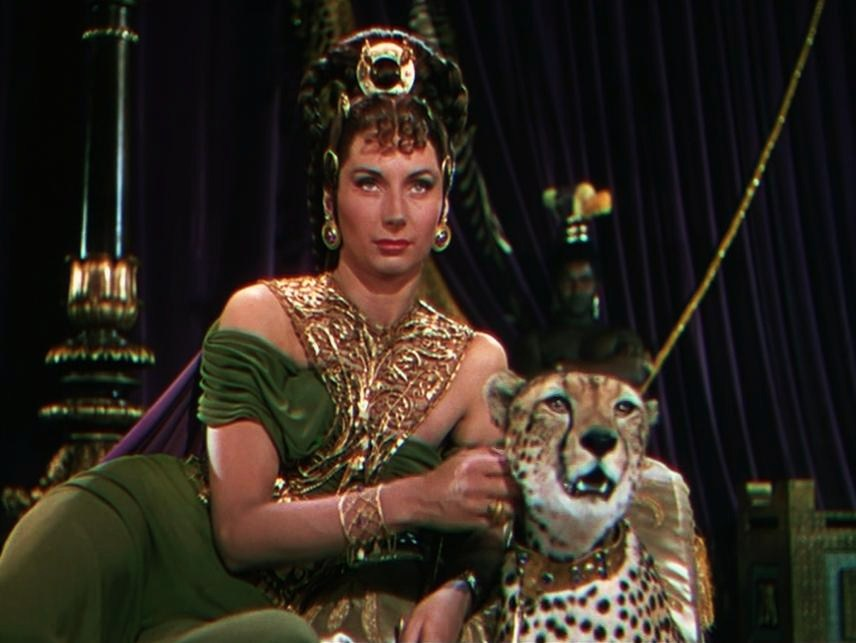
- Patricia Laffan in Quo Vadis (1951)
- Born: Patricia Alice Laffan; 19 March 1919; Streatham, London, England
- Died: 10 March 2014 (aged 94); Chelsea, London, England
- Occupation: Actress
- Years active: 1936–1966

Patricia Alice Laffan (19 March 1919 – 10 March 2014) was an English stage, film, television and radio actress, and also, after her retirement from acting, an international fashion impresario. She is best known for her film roles as the Empress Poppaea in Quo Vadis (1951) and the alien Nyah in Devil Girl from Mars (1954). Her biography, Devil Girl Remembered, was written by Andrew Ross in 2021.

== Early life ==
Patricia Laffan was the daughter of Irish-born Arthur Charles Laffan (1870–1948) and London-born Elvira Alice Vitali (1896–1979). She described her father as 'a successful rubber planter in Malaya'. Her parents returned to the British Isles shortly before the birth of their daughter in London. On seeing the MGM film The Broadway Melody (1929) at the age of ten, Patricia decided she wanted to act. She was educated at schools in Folkestone, Kent, and at the Institut Français in London. At the Webber-Douglas Dramatic School she studied acting. She also studied dancing at the De Vos Ballet School.

== Career ==
Laffan's first film appearance was in One Good Turn (1936). She joined the Oxford Playhouse Repertory Company, and her first stage appearance was as Jenny Diver in The Beggar's Opera (January 1937) at the Oxford Playhouse. Her first London appearance was as the Young Girl in Surprise Item (25 February 1938) at the Ambassadors Theatre. Her first credited film part may have been as a cast member in Cross Beams (1940). She toured military bases throughout England during World War II, appearing in Hay Fever and Twelfth Night. In the period 1946-1947 she appeared in six teleplays for the BBC, in which she had substantial roles and was always credited. From this point onwards her film roles were also more substantial and always credited. In 1947 she was cast with Don Stannard in the short mystery film Death in High Heels as Magda Doon, a fashion model and unintended murder victim. In 1948 she was in another short film, Who Killed Van Loon?, starring Raymond Lovell. In 1950 she appeared in the feature-length crime drama Hangman's Wharf as Rosa Warren, a glamorous film star.

In the M-G-M Technicolor film Quo Vadis (1951) she played Poppaea, the second wife of the Roman Emperor Nero (Peter Ustinov). The producer and director selected her for this major role after they watched a screen-test she had made for a smaller part in the film. The film was her first film in colour, and it was the longest, most expensive and most commercially successful film in which she would appear. Her performance as Poppaea has drawn considerable praise over the years.

In Escape Route (1952), a crime thriller starring George Raft, she played Irma Brooks. She starred as the ruthless, PVC-clad alien Nyah in the science fiction movie Devil Girl from Mars (1954), which is now a cult classic. She had a sizeable supporting role as Miss Alice MacDonald in 20th Century Fox's CinemaScope mystery thriller 23 Paces to Baker Street (1956). By the 1960s she appeared mainly on radio and television, including performances in Anna Karenina, The Aspern Papers, and Rembrandt, and panel game shows such as Petticoat Line and Call My Bluff. In the late 1960s and 1970s she produced and choreographed fashion shows around the world.

The 10 July 1954 issue of Picture Show magazine featured "The Life Story of Patricia Laffan", which included these facts:

"She lists fast cars and breeding bull terriers as her hobbies. She is quick-witted and says that had she not become an actress she would probably have been a writer. As a matter of fact, she has had a number of short stories published, and during the time she spent in Paris she wrote scripts for the Paris radio. She speaks French fluently."

Laffan had a piece printed in Winter Pie -- Miscellany for Men & Women ( A Pie Pocket Special), published in October 1947. It was entitled "Penicillin and Paris" and was a breezy account of her "first weekend in Paris," under doctor's orders to take vitamins and a holiday. She was "wined and dined on the right bank and on the left" and broadcast (and sang Night and Day with a large band) over Radiodiffusion Francaise. There is a reference to the fact that she was appearing in the film The Rake's Progress, then showing in Paris.

The Pittston Gazette on 20 January 1955 had an item discussing Laffan's first visit to the United States for a combination of work and vacation. She was scouting out panel and quiz shows (she appeared in several in England) to compare notes on American methods. She noted that "The air's so good here." On 25 January 1956, the Daily Reporter ran an item from Louella Parsons: “Hollywood is talking about the uncanny resemblance of British actress Patricia Laffan to Gertrude Lawrence, and the interest in Patricia to play the Lawrence biography…”

== Later life ==
Laffan was interviewed in London on 21 March 1998 by Lisa Cohen, for her book All We Know (Farrar, Straus and Giroux 2012), an account of the lives of three women: New York intellectual Esther Murphy Strachey, writer-feminist Mercedes de Acosta, and British Vogue fashion editor Madge Garland. Laffan had a tangential connection to Garland, who was romantically involved with divorce lawyer Frances (Fay) Blacket Gill, one of the first women solicitors in England. Laffan is referred to as Gill's "last girlfriend", and she briefly discusses Gill and her relationship with Garland. In 2008, Laffan was interviewed by Matthew Sweet for the BBC Four documentary Truly, Madly, Cheaply: British B Movies.

Laffan died at Chelsea and Westminster Hospital in London on 10 March 2014, just nine days short of her 95th birthday. The cause of death was given as multiple organ failure, cardiogenic shock, and myocardial infarction with secondary urinary sepsis consistent with acute kidney injury.

== Filmography ==
- One Good Turn (1936) (first film appearance)
- Cross Beams (1940) - Cast Member (possibly first credited film appearance)
- The Dark Tower (1943) as Nurse (uncredited)
- The Rake's Progress (1945) as Miss Fernandez
- Old Mother Riley at Home (1945) - Cast Member
- Caravan (1946) as Betty (uncredited)
- I See a Dark Stranger (1946) - Cast Member (uncredited)
- Death in High Heels (1947) as Magda Doon
- Who Killed Van Loon? (1948) as Peggy Osborn
- Hangman's Wharf (1950) as Rosa Warren
- Quo Vadis (1951) as Poppaea Sabina
- I'll Get You (1951) as Irma Brookes
- Rough Shoot (1953) as Magda
- Don't Blame the Stork (1954) as Lilian Angel
- Devil Girl from Mars (1954) as Nyah
- Misalliance (1954) as Lina Szczepanowska
- 23 Paces to Baker Street (1956) as Miss Alice MacDonald
- Dial 999 (TV series) (1958) - ('The Killing Job') as Liz (billed as "Colleta's Girlfriend")
- Dial 999 (TV series) (1958) - ('Illegal Entry') as Baroness von Falkan
- Hidden Homicide (1959) as Jean Gilson
- Crooks in Cloisters (1964) as Lady Florence

== Theatre ==
- 1937 repertory at Oxford and Worthing
- 1937 The Beggar's Opera (Jenny Diver), Oxford Playhouse (first stage appearance)
- 1937 Sweet Adversity (Nurse Gertrude), Q Theatre
- 1938 Surprise Item (Young Girl), Ambassadors (first London appearance)
- 1938 One Way Street (Nurse), Q Theatre
- 1939 Number Six (Stephanie), Aldwych Theatre
- 1939 Honeymoon for Three (Marjorie Saunders), Richmond
- 1939 Pericles (Diana), Open Air, Regent's Park
- 1941 The Women, Q Theatre
- 1941 The First Mrs Fraser (Mabel), on Marie Tempest's last tour
- 1942 Hay Fever (Myra), tour
- 1942 Other People's Houses (Annie), tour
- 1943 Androcles and the Lion (Lavinia), Arts Theatre
- 1943 Wuthering Heights (Isabella), tour
- 1943 Twelfth Night (Viola and Olivia), tour for CEMA
- 1944 How Are They at Home? (Eileen Stokes), Apollo
- 1945 Hidden Horizon (Kay Mostyn), Wimbledon
- 1948 Corinth House (Madge Donnythorpe), New Lindsey
- 1948 Frolic Wind (Miss Vulliamy), Boltons
- 1949 Primrose and the Peanuts (Primrose Mallet), Playhouse
- 1950 New England Night (Helen Wetherell), New Lindsey
- 1951 Mary Had a Little. . . (the Princess), Strand
- 1960 The Golden Touch (Comtesse de St Marigny–Marbeaux), Piccadilly
- 1960 Innocent as Hell (Lady Parsley), Lyric, Hammersmith

== Bibliography ==
MGM presents Quo Vadis (original film brochure • 20 pages, including covers) [ 1951 ]

Picture Show Who's Who on the Screen (The Amalgamated Press • London • 1956) p86

McFarlane, Brian (Ed): The Encyclopedia of British Film (BFI/Methuen • London • 2003/2005) pp395–396
