= Eileen Moore =

British actress (born 1932)

Eileen Moore (born August 1932 in London, England) is a British actress. She is best known as Sheila in the film An Inspector Calls.

== Life ==
Moore was born in London in August 1932. She was married to actor George Cole from 1954 until their divorce in 1962. They had two children. She met Cole on the set of An Inspector Calls. In 1968 she married Michael Anthony Owens.

Her children include the writer and producer Crispin Cole and daughter Harriet Cole.

== Films ==
- Mr. Denning Drives North (1951) as Liz Denning
- The Happy Family (1952) as Joan
- The Girl on the Pier (1953) as Cathy Chubb
- The Good Beginning (1953) as Kit Lipson
- The Men of Sherwood Forest (1954) as Lady Alys
- An Inspector Calls (1954) as Sheila Birling (where she met George Cole)
- The Green Man (1956) as Joan Wood (with George Cole as a co-star)
- A Town Like Alice (1956) as Mrs Holland
- Devil's Bait (1959) as Barbara
- Cry Wolf (1969) as Muriel Walker (for the Children's Film Foundation)

== TV ==
- Dixon of Dock Green (1955)
- Colonel March of Scotland Yard (1956)
- Danger Man (1960)
- The Third Man (series) 1960
- Dr. Finlay's Casebook (1962)
- Champion House (1967)
- Les Miserables (series) 1967–8
- Catweazle (series) 1970
