= The Window (1949 film) =

Film by Ted Tetzlaff

- Theatrical release poster
- Directed by: Ted Tetzlaff
- Screenplay by: Mel Dinelli
- Based on: "The Boy Cried Murder"; 1947 story in Mystery Book Magazine by Cornell Woolrich
- Produced by: Frederic Ullman Jr. in charge of productions Dore Schary
- Starring: Barbara Hale; Bobby Driscoll; Arthur Kennedy; Paul Stewart; Ruth Roman
- Cinematography: Robert De Grasse; William O. Steiner
- Edited by: Frederic Knudtson
- Music by: Roy Webb
- Production company: RKO Radio Pictures
- Distributed by: RKO Radio Pictures
- Release dates: May 17, 1949 (Premiere-Los Angeles); August 6, 1949 (U.S.)
- Running time: 73 minutes
- Country: United States
- Language: English
- Budget: $210,000 or $500,000

The Window is a 1949 American black-and-white film noir, based on the short story "The Boy Cried Murder" (reprinted as "Fire Escape") by Cornell Woolrich, about a lying boy who witnesses a killing but is not believed. The film, a critical success that was shot on location in New York City, was produced by Frederic Ullman Jr. for $210,000 but earned much more, making it a box-office hit for RKO Pictures. The film was directed by Ted Tetzlaff, who worked as a cinematographer on over 100 films, including another successful suspense film, Alfred Hitchcock's Notorious (1946). For his performances in this film and in So Dear to My Heart, Bobby Driscoll was presented with a miniature Oscar statuette as the outstanding juvenile actor of 1949 at the 1950 Academy Awards ceremony.

== Plot ==
In New York's Lower East Side, lives young Tommy Woodry, who has a habit of crying wolf. Late one night, while trying to sleep on the building fire escape, he sees his two seemingly normal neighbors, Mr. and Mrs. Kellerson, murder a drunken sailor in their apartment. No one – neither the boy's parents nor the police – believes Tommy when he tells them what he has seen, since they all assume that this is just another of the boy's tall tales.

When Mrs. Woodry takes Tommy to apologize to the Kellersons, he refuses, and they become suspicious of him. When Mrs. Woodry leaves to care for a sick relative, and Mr. Woodry is away at his night job, the murderous neighbors plan to kill Tommy, who has been locked in his room by his father to prevent other escapades. Under the pretense of going to the police, the Kellersons take Tommy to a dark alley, where they try to kill him. Tommy escapes, but the pair quickly recaptures him, taking him to their apartment in a taxi. Tommy screams at a policeman for help, but the officer remembers Tommy as the boy who came to the station earlier and failed to convince the police. The Kellersons fool the cab driver by posing as Tommy's parents. Returning home from work early, Mr. Woodry discovers Tommy missing and asks a neighborhood police officer for help. The officer uses a police box to request a radio car.

Meanwhile, the Kellersons have Tommy secured in their apartment. Tommy escapes and climbs onto the roof, and he is pursued by Mr. Kellerson to a nearby building that is in the process of being demolished. The police officer suggests that Tommy went to see his mother, and he and Mr. Woodry leave the tenement. Tommy sees his father leave in his car and shouts for him, the sound of which alerts Mr. Kellerson to Tommy's location. The chase resumes with Tommy's finding the body of the dead sailor and then scrambling upstairs; when Kellerson follows, the stairwell collapses, leaving him struggling to gain sure footing as he continues grasping for Tommy. Tommy pushes a rafter aside, causing it to collapse and send Kellerson falling to his death, but the young boy is left stranded on the remainder of the beam suspended many stories above the ground. Neighbors hear his cries for help and send for fire and rescue personnel. A collapsible net is set up below Tommy, and he is encouraged to jump to safety before the beam collapses.

Tommy explains everything as he is escorted to a police cruiser, including where to find Mrs. Kellerson and the murder victim. His father assures him how proud he is as they ride to the police station, and Tommy promises to stop inventing stories.

== Cast ==
- Barbara Hale as Mrs. Mary Woodry
- Arthur Kennedy as Mr. Ed Woodry
- Paul Stewart as Joe Kellerson
- Ruth Roman as Mrs. Jean Kellerson
- Bobby Driscoll as Tommy Woodry
- Anthony Ross as Detective Ross (uncredited)

== Production ==
The story "The Boy Cried Murder" was published in 1947 and optioned by RKO who assigned Fredrick Ullman to produce. Ullman had been head of RKO's documentary and shorts department. Dickie Tyler, who had been in The Bells of St Marys and Christopher Blake was mentioned as a possible star. The film was to be made at RKO's Pathe Studio in New York.

Mel Dinelli, who had written The Spiral Staircase for RKO production chief Dore Schary, adapted the story for the screen, and the movie was given the title of The Window. Ted Tetzlaff was given the job of directing.

Ullman wanted to use a semi-documentary style as he came from that background. RKO executives decided to film in Hollywood then changed their mind and went back to New York. Filming started 10 November 1947. It was the first movie RKO shot in that city in a long time. By the time that the film was ready for release in 1948, the millionaire Howard Hughes had taken over the studio and refused to release it, saying it wouldn't make any money and that Bobby Driscoll wasn't much of an actor. However, in 1949, he was persuaded to release it, and it became a critical and financial success, earning many times its production costs. Driscoll was awarded the Juvenile Oscar for his outstanding performance in it.

Driscoll was under contract with Walt Disney, which "loaned" him to RKO for this film.

== Reception ==
=== Critical response ===
When the film was first released, The New York Times lauded the film:

The striking force and terrifying impact of this RKO melodrama is chiefly due to Bobby's brilliant acting, for the whole effect would have been lost were there any suspicion of doubt about the credibility of this pivotal character. Occasionally, the director overdoes things a bit in striving for shock effects, such as when the half-conscious boy teeters on the rail of a fire-escape or is trapped on a high beam in an abandoned house on the verge of collapse. However, though you may be aware of contrivance in these instances, it is not likely that you will remain immune to the excitement. Indeed, there is such an acute expression of peril etched on the boy's face and reflected by his every movement as he flees death in the crumbling house that one experiences an overwhelming anxiety for his safety.

Decades later, in 2003, critic Dennis Schwartz discussed the noir aspects of the film as well as its depiction of the challenges facing parents living in the inner city in the mid-20th century:

The city slum is pictured as not an easy place to raise a child, as there appears no safe place to play. Though the times have changed, this taut tale nevertheless remains gripping and realistic. The modern city is not any less dangerous than the postwar years of the 1940s (undoubtedly even more dangerous). This film noir thriller exploits the meaning of the American dream to work hard for all the material things that were becoming available and ultimately find a utopia in the suburbs, as it cries out for the children left to their own devices to survive in such harsh surroundings as their parents have become too busy to raise them properly.

TV Guide in its 2008 assessment also praised the thriller, especially Tetzlaff's highly effective composition of scenes and his direction of the camera:

...this incredibly tense nail-biter stars Driscoll as a young boy who has a habit of crying wolf...The Window presents a frightening vision of helplessness, vividly conveying childish frustration at being dismissed or ignored by one's parents. Director and onetime cameraman Tetzlaff adroitly injects a maximum of suspense into the film, enabling the audience to identify with Driscoll's predicament and to view his parents as evil, almost as evil as the murderers themselves. Having photographed Hitchcock's Notorious just three years before, Tetzlaff had, without a shadow of a doubt, learned something of his suspense-building craft from the master of that art (as did just about every working director)...An exceptional film.

=== Awards ===
Wins

- Edgar Allan Poe Awards: Edgar, Best Motion Picture, Mel Dinelli and Cornell Woolrich; 1950.

Honors

- Academy Honorary Award: Juvenile Oscar, "Outstanding Juvenile Actor of 1949", Bobby Driscoll; 1950.

Nominations

- Academy Awards: Oscar, Best Film Editing, Frederic Knudtson; 1950.
- British Academy of Film and Television Arts: BAFTA Film Award, Best Film from any Source, USA; 1950.
- Writers Guild of America: WGA Award (Screen), Best Written American Drama, Mel Dinelli; 1950.

== Adaptations ==
The film has been remade three times:

- The Boy Cried Murder (1966)
- Cloak & Dagger (1984)
- Witness to a Killing
