= The Cabin in the Clearing =

1954 BBC children's TV series

The Cabin in the Clearing is a British television series that aired in 1954 on the BBC. All five episodes are believed to be lost. It was a half-hour children's western set in Ohio in the early nineteenth century, and based on the 1890 novel of the same name written by Edward S. Ellis. Episodes were transmitted live, as was usually the case with 1954 BBC series, and don't appear to have been telerecorded. The serial ran from 16 February to 16 March 1954, but a remake - which included some members of the original cast, such as Ann Hanslip, Derek Aylward and Ewen Solon - was shown between 14 January to 1 February 1959.

== Plot ==
The Sutherlands, a frontier family settling out in Ohio, USA, find themselves under siege in the wilderness when the Miami Indians and Shawnee Indians tribes decide to unite and set about attacking white settlers. With help far away, the Sutherlands have only their friend Bradley Ripley - hidden out in the woods - to help them to have any chance of escape. Ripley is accompanied by Mul-Keep Mo, a Native Indian whose life he once saved, and together they must plot how to rescue the Sutherland family from their perilous situation.

== 1954 Cast Members ==
- Shaun Sutton as Silas Sutherland
- Peggy Mount as Polly Sutherland
- Ann Hanslip as Alice
- Charles Swain as Scipio
- Derek Aylward as Brayton Ripley
- Tony Van Bridge as Simon Kenton
- Ewen Solon as Mul-Keep-Mo
- Carl Duering as Haw-Hu-Da

== 1959 Cast Members ==
- Thomas Heathcote as Silas Sutherland
- Brenda Dunrich as Polly Sutherland
- Ann Hanslip as Alice
- Joseph Leyode as Scipio
- Derek Aylward as Brayton Ripley
- Patrick Troughton as Simon Kenton
- Ewen Solon as Mul-Keep-Mo
- John Woodnutt as Haw-Hu-Da
