= Sydney Bacon Palmer =

Colonial British official in Malaysia

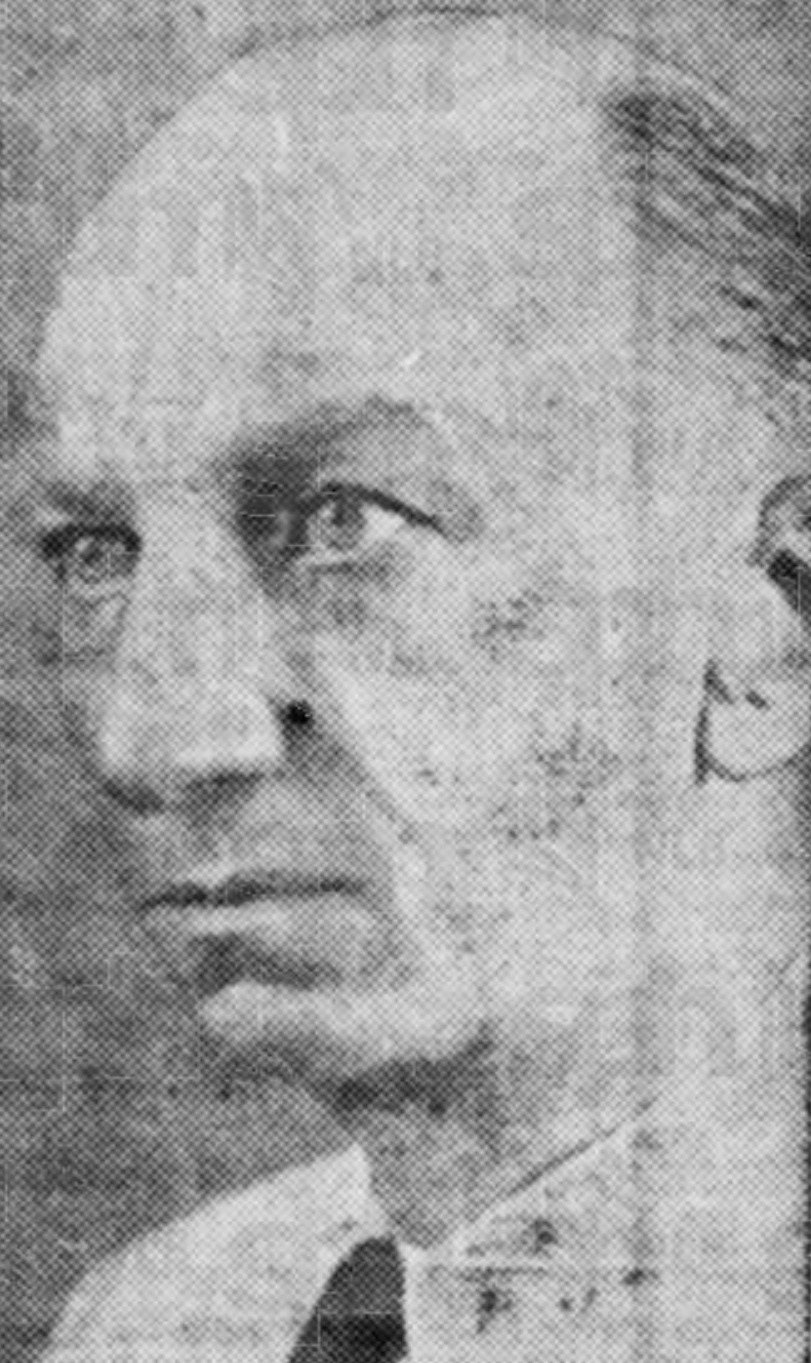
Palmer in 1947

Sydney Bacon Palmer (1890 - 9 March 1954) was the first chairman of the Malaysian Estates Staff Provident Fund. He also held various roles in the Selangor Turf Club and the Rotary Club of Taiping, and was an advocate for the propagation of the use of natural rubber. He was also a member of the State Council of Perak, a Federal Councillor, president of the United Planting Association of Malaya and an unofficial member of the Malayan Union Advisory Council. He served on various Malayan committees and boards.

== Early life ==
Palmer was born in 1890. He was the third son of R.W. Palmer of Swafield, Norfolk. He travelled to Asia in the early 1900s and arrived in British Malaya in 1910.

== Career ==
Palmer began work as an assistant manager at the Henrietta Estate in Kedah in 1911. He opposed the enforcing of restrictions on British planters in Malaya by the colonial government, as he believed that such restrictions would hinder the growth and profitability of the rubber industry. He later became the director of several local estate interests and founded a firm of visiting agents. He was nominated to represent the planting community in the Perak State Council from 1932 to 1942. He was made an unofficial member of the Federated Malay States Federal Council on 10 May 1935. He served as the president of the United Planting Association of Malaya from 1935 to 1936, in 1938, from 1940 to 1942, and from 1946 to 1948. He served as an unofficial member of the Malayan Union Advisory Council from 1946 to 1947, as well as a member on the Federal Legislative Council from 1948 to 1949. He became the first chairman of the Malaysian Estates Staff Provident Fund, which was established in 1947. He was conferred the CBE in 1949. He sent his letter of resignation as the chairman of the Malaysian Estates Staff Provident Fund to the fund's Board of Trustees on 16 March 1949, and was succeeded by Hadley Humphrey Facer in April.

In 1931, he was elected as president to the Taiping Turf Club. From 1936 to 1939, he served as the charter president of the Rotary Club of Taiping.

== Personal life and death ==
He owned several horses prior to World War II. Several of his horses were owned in partnership with Charles Vyner Brooke, then White Rajah of the Raj of Sarawak. Although he supported measures to improve horse racing in Singapore, he strongly opposed the legalisation of bookmaking in Singapore.

He died in London on 9 March 1954.
