= Devil Girl from Mars =

1954 British film by David MacDonald

- Theatrical release poster
- Directed by: David MacDonald
- Written by: James Eastwood; John C. Mather
- Produced by: Edward J. Danziger; Harry Lee Danziger
- Starring: Patricia Laffan; Hugh McDermott; Hazel Court; Peter Reynolds; Adrienne Corri
- Cinematography: Jack Cox
- Edited by: Peter Taylor
- Music by: Edwin Astley
- Production company: Danziger Productions
- Distributed by: British Lion Films
- Release date: 5 October 1954
- Running time: 77 minutes
- Country: United Kingdom
- Language: English

Devil Girl from Mars is a 1954 British second feature black-and-white science fiction film directed by David MacDonald and starring Patricia Laffan, Hugh McDermott, Hazel Court, Peter Reynolds, and Adrienne Corri. The screenplay was by James Eastwood-based (per on-screen credits) on a play by John C. Mather and Eastwood, and was produced by the Danziger Brothers. It was released by British Lion and released in the United States the following year.

A female alien is sent from Mars to acquire human males to replace their declining male population. When negotiation, then intimidation, fails she must use force to obtain co-operation from a remote Scottish village where she has landed her crippled flying saucer.

== Plot ==
Nyah, a female commander from Mars, heads for London in her flying saucer. She is part of the advance alien team looking for Earthmen to replace the declining male population on her world, the result of a "devastating war between the sexes". Because of damage to her craft, caused when entering the Earth's atmosphere, and an apparent crash with an airliner, she is forced to land in the remote Scottish moors. She is armed with a raygun that can paralyse or kill, and is accompanied by a tall, menacing robot named Chani.

Professor Arnold Hennessey, an astrophysicist, accompanied by journalist Michael Carter, is sent by the British government to investigate the effects of the crash, believed to be caused by a meteorite. The pair come to the Bonnie Charlie, a remote inn run by Mr and Mrs Jamieson in the depths of the Scottish Highlands.

At the bar they meet Ellen Prestwick, a fashion model who came to the Bonnie Charlie to escape an affair with a married man. She quickly forms a romantic liaison with Carter. Meanwhile, escaped convict Robert Justin (under the alias Albert Simpson), convicted for accidentally killing his wife, comes to the inn to reunite with barmaid Doris, with whom he is in love.

Nyah happens across the inn, incinerates the Jamiesons' handyman David, and enters the bar. When she finds no one willing to come with her to Mars, she responds with intimidation, trapping the guests and staff within an invisible wall and turning Chani loose to vaporise much of the manor's grounds. Discovering Justin and Tommy, the Jamiesons' young nephew, hiding in the grounds, Nyah kidnaps Tommy as a possible male specimen, and sends Justin back to the inn under some manner of mind control. Nyah then brings Professor Hennessy aboard her spaceship to view the technological achievements of Martian civilisation, including the ship's atomic power source. In exchange for Tommy, Carter volunteers to go to Mars with Nyah.

Realising that the only road to victory over Nyah requires trickery, Hennessy suggests Carter sabotage the ship's power source after takeoff. However, Carter attempts a double cross before boarding the ship, snatching Nyah's controller for Chani, but this attempt is thwarted by Nyah's mind control powers. Carter is released by Nyah, and they both return to the bar, where she announces that she will destroy the inn and kill everyone within when she leaves for London. However she allows for one man to go with her in order to escape death. The men draw lots and Carter wins the draw, still hoping to enact Hennessy's plan to destroy the spaceship.

At the last minute, Justin, alone at the bar and now free from mind control when Nyah returns, offers to go with her of his own free will. After take-off he successfully sabotages Nyah's flying saucer, sacrificing himself to save the men of Earth, and atoning for the death of his wife. The survivors celebrate their escape with a drink at the bar.

== Cast ==
- Patricia Laffan as Nyah, the Devil Girl from Mars
- Hugh McDermott as Michael Carter
- Hazel Court as Ellen Prestwick
- Peter Reynolds as Robert Justin/Albert Simpson
- Adrienne Corri as Doris
- Joseph Tomelty as Professor Arnold Hennessey
- John Laurie as Mr. Jamieson
- Sophie Stewart as Mrs. Jamieson
- Anthony Richmond as Tommy
- James Edmond as David
- Stuart Hibberd as news reader (voice only)

== Production ==
In an interview with Frank J. Dello Stritto, screenwriter John Chartres Mather claimed that Devil Girl from Mars came about while he was working with The Danzigers, who were producing Calling Scotland Yard (1953) that appeared as both an American television series and as cinema featurettes in Great Britain and the British Commonwealth. When production finished ahead of schedule, Mather says he was ordered to use up the remaining film studio time already booked and paid for by working on a feature film for the Danzigers. The interview also states that Patricia Laffan's devil girl costume was economically made by designer John Sutcliffe. The film's opening credits, however, state: "Miss Laffan's costume designed by Ronald Cobb."

The film was made at Shepperton Studios with sets designed by the art director Norman G. Arnold. It was made on a very low budget, with no retakes except in cases where the actual film stock became damaged; it was shot over a period of three weeks, often filming well into the night. Actress Hazel Court later said: "I remember great fun on the set. It was like a repertory company acting that film".

The robot, named Chani, was constructed by Jack Whitehead and was operated by a human being.

The alien Klaatu, posing as "Mr. Carpenter" in The Day the Earth Stood Still (1951), was intended by screenwriter Edmund H. North to evoke Jesus Christ, and there are indications that the Martian woman Nyah was intended to evoke an anti-Virgin Mary image.

Devil Girl from Mars's sound editor was Gerry Anderson (credited as Gerald Anderson), later to create UK television series such as Thunderbirds. To save time and money, composer Edwin Astley reused his Saber of London TV series score for the film.

== Critical reception ==
At the time of the film's release Gavin Lambert wrote in The Monthly Film Bulletin:

This primitive British effort at science-fiction is quite enjoyably ludicrous, mainly on account of Patricia Laffan's splendid Nyah. Clothed in black silk tights, a black cloak, a metallurgical-looking wig and walled in make-up, she moves with the air of a sleep-walker, never looking at the person to whom she is talking and speaking her lines – particularly those describing the scientific marvels of her planet – in an impatient monotone, as if contemptuous of any meaning they may, from time to time, contain. One would like to see Nyah again, preferably in a serial. The romance of mannequin and journalist, also, will have its appeal to connoisseurs of life among the English. Settings, dialogue, characterisation and special effects are of a low order; but even their modest unreality has its charm. There is really no fault in this film that one would like to see eliminated. Everything, in its way, is quite perfect.

Contemporaneously Kine Weekly said:

Effective interplay of character establishes human interest without curbing essential spectacle, and the ending literally goes with a bang. At once ingenious stunt offering and artful woman's stuff, its conquest of both worlds stands it in good stead. ...The picture keeps the strange and frightening 'flying saucer' at a respectable distance, but resourceful camera work gives the illusion validity ... and the characters are not dwarfed by the gimmicks. Although the shots of the rocket-ship landing, departing and disintegrating are arresting, they are not introduced at the expense of human interest. The sacrifice made by Albert is the heart of its sensational and salutary matter.

Rolling Stone columnist Doug Pratt called Devil Girl from Mars a "delightfully bad movie". The "acting is really bad and the whole thing is so much fun you want to run to your local community theatre group and have them put it on next, instead of Brigadoon."

American film reviewer Leonard Maltin said the film is a "hilariously solemn, high camp British imitation of U.S. cheapies".

Filmink called it "bonkers fun".

In Going to Mars: The Stories of the People Behind NASA's Mars Missions Past, Present, and Future, Muirhead et al. describe the film as "an undeniably awful but oddly interesting" film. They noted that the plot was "more a reflection of the 1950s view of politics and the era's inequality of the sexes than a thoughtful projection of present or future possibilities".

In Mars: A Tour of the Human Imagination, Eric S. Rabkin likens the character Nyah to a dominatrix and even a neo-Nazi. He said of the film that, "a host of charged images and subconscious fears" are handled with a broad camp irony. Otherwise, "without some underlying psychological engagement, how could anyone sit through a movie so badly made"?

British film critic Leslie Halliwell said: "Absurd attempt to cash in on the then new science fiction craze. The budget matches the imagination."

In British Sound Films: The Studio Years 1928–1959 David Quinlan rated the film as "average", writing: "Talky science-film runs like an early serial."

Chibnall and McFarlane in The British 'B' Film wrote:

Clad as a dominatrix in leather cap, cloak and stiletto boots, [Nyah] is a genuinely shocking figure in the staid world of British film-making of the time: it is as if the underworld of S&M fetishism had suddenly surfaced, and with it the collective unconscious of the nation. Backed by the mechanised might of her faithful robot (resembling a fridge on legs) she imparts a sexual charge that the film's scenario struggles to contain, and gives a wholly different spin to the desire expressed by another of the inn's visitors, the prodigal metropolitan model played by Hazel Court, to spend more time in the country, find the right man, have children. Nyah is an eroticised threat to a patriarchy that was increasingly troubled in the post-war years. She comes to turn the proud men of Earth into sex slaves for her matriarchal order. ... Devil Girl From Mars is, therefore, not only a camp classic but an ideologically significant moment in 1950s British cinema.

== Legacy ==
The film inspired Hugo and Nebula award-winning author Octavia E. Butler to begin writing science fiction. After watching the motion picture at age 12, she declared that she could write something better.

The Los Angeles avant-garde artist Gronk lists this film as the crucial factor that guided him in his career choice.

Devil Girl from Mars developed a following via home video.

== See also ==
- Mars Needs Women (1967); a gender-reversed version of the same theme
- Under the Skin (2013); a somewhat similar theme
