= Curigwen Lewis =

Welsh actress (1905–1992)

Curigwen Lewis (1 November 1905 – 17 February 1992) was a Welsh actress of stage and screen.

She was born in Llandrindod Wells as Martha Curigwen Lewis. In 1939 she married actor Andrew Cruickshank, with whom she appeared in two episodes of Dr. Finlay's Casebook. The couple had three children.

She was a leading lady with the Birmingham Repertory Company and the Old Vic Company.

Her television work included Choir Practice (1949) and Pride and Prejudice (1938). In the 1954 film John Wesley, she portrayed Susanna Wesley, the mother of John and Charles Wesley. In 1949, she played the leading role of Bathsheba Everdene in a BBC radio dramatisation of Far From the Madding Crowd.

She died, aged 86, in Westminster, London.
