= Misalliance (1954 film) =

- Written by: George Bernard Shaw
- Starring: Richard Leech; Patricia Laffan; Allan Cuthbertson
- Country of origin: United Kingdom
- Original language: English

Production
- Producer: Douglas Allen
- Running time: 105 minutes
- Production company: BBC

Original release
- Release: 27 July 1954

Misalliance is a 1954 BBC television film adapted from the play written by George Bernard Shaw.

== Cast ==
- Richard Leech as Johnny Tarleton
- Kenneth Williams as Bentley Summerhays
- Mary Watson as Hypatia Tarleton
- Olga Lindo as Mrs. Tarleton
- Maurice Colbourne as Lord Summerhays
- Arthur Young as Mr. Tarleton
- Allan Cuthbertson as Joseph Percival
- Patricia Laffan as Lina Szczepanowska
- Patrick Troughton as Gunner
