= Happy Holidays (TV series) =

1954 British TV series

Happy Holidays was a British television mini-series aired on the BBC during 1954. Its cast included Hattie Jacques, John Le Mesurier, Clive Dunn, Carole Lorimer, Colin Campbell, Robert Scroggins, and Anthony Lang. Although telerecording existed, none of the episodes remain in the archives.
