= An Inspector Calls (1954 film) =

- Theatrical release poster
- Directed by: Guy Hamilton
- Written by: Desmond Davis
- Based on: An Inspector Calls by J.B. Priestley
- Produced by: A. D. Peters
- Starring: Alastair Sim; Jane Wenham; Eileen Moore
- Cinematography: Ted Scaife
- Edited by: Alan Osbiston
- Music by: Francis Chagrin
- Color process: Black and white
- Production company: Watergate Productions
- Distributed by: British Lion Films
- Release date: 11 March 1954 (London)
- Running time: 80 minutes
- Country: United Kingdom
- Language: English

An Inspector Calls is a 1954 British drama film directed by Guy Hamilton and starring Alastair Sim, Jane Wenham and Eileen Moore. It was written by Desmond Davis, adapted from the 1945 play An Inspector Calls by J.B. Priestley. It was shot at Shepperton Studios with sets designed by the art director Joseph Bato.

== Plot ==
In 1912, the prosperous Birling family sit at a dining table at the end of a dinner party with their friend, Gerald Croft, who is engaged to the daughter, Sheila. Mother chastises Eric, the son, for drinking too much. Father discusses the likelihood of war and after the meal discusses his possible knighthood with Gerald over port and cigars. They are interrupted by a man calling himself Inspector Poole, investigating the suicide of a working-class girl, Eva Smith, whose death is linked to each family member. Eva has poisoned herself. She left a diary. Eva was one of Mr Birling's workers in his factory.

In a flashback to 1910, Eva is seen working in the machine shop in his factory. She goes with a group of women to demand a pay increase from 22/6 to 25/- per week. Birling refuses and tells them to find another job if they are unhappy. Back in the Birling house, the father cannot see what any of this has to do with him. The inspector explains that after Eva was sacked from Birling's she had a period of unemployment, then went to work at Milward's but was dismissed after two months after a customer complained. It becomes clear that this was Sheila.

In a second flashback, Sheila is trying to choose a hat with her mother. Sheila accuses Eva of being rude for smiling as she struggles to fit the hat and demands she is dismissed.

Sheila explains she was jealous of her looks. The inspector says Eva then changed her name to Daisy Renton, to which Gerald looks shocked. Gerald confesses to Sheila that he had an affair with Daisy beginning in March 1911. He says he met Daisy at the Palace Variety Show and a third flashback shows Gerald in the bar where he tricks the man she was with to leave and takes his seat. He takes her for a meal and, finding she is homeless, lets her use his townhouse and gives her money to survive on. It develops into an affair, but he does not go out with her in public. On one of his visits, she realises that he is building up to breaking off their affair, and, to make things easier for him, tells him they should separate as she realises that he only ever felt sorry for her, although she is very much in love with him. She leaves the flat the next day.

It is revealed that Mrs Birling refused Eva charity in her role as chairwoman of a charity committee. The refusal was on the grounds that a pregnant Eva gave the name Birling and claims her husband left her. She accuses Eva of having used the name Birling because she knows that is her surname, but Eva says she had no prior knowledge of this and had used the name because she used to work at Birling's. She refuses to name the father, saying he tried to help her but was unable to do so. Other members of the committee feel sympathy for Eva, but Mrs Birling insists that aid be refused. Mrs Birling tells the Inspector that the main blame lies with the girl, but also that the young man who made her pregnant should be punished. She brushes aside Sheila's attempts to stop her condemnation. Finally, Eric is shown to have met Eva on a tram. They have an affair and Eva falls pregnant. He steals money to support her, but she refuses it when she realises it was stolen. This is when she goes to Mrs Birling but is turned down. In summary, each person is partially responsible for Eva's death.

Gerald asks a policeman outside and discovers there is no "Inspector Poole" in that town. He goes back into the house to challenge Poole. Birling asks Poole to wait in the study while they discuss it. They all feel partially unburdened of their guilt except Sheila and Eric. They decide to turn it all round to avoid a scandal and realise there is no evidence. They also realise the photo of the girl was only shown to one at a time, so they cannot be sure it was the same girl. Gerald phones the infirmary to check if the girl is really dead but is told no-one died. It is all a strange scam. Mr and Mrs Birling decide to go back to how they were, though Sheila and Eric are permanently changed. Going back to the study, Mr Birling discovers that the Inspector has disappeared, but there is no possible exit from the room apart from the door, which was in their view the whole time.

Then the phone rings. A girl has just died at the infirmary and an inspector is on his way.

== Cast ==
- Alastair Sim as Inspector Poole
- Jane Wenham as Eva Smith / Daisy Renton
- Eileen Moore as Sheila Birling
- Bryan Forbes as Eric Birling
- Brian Worth as Gerald Croft
- Olga Lindo as Sybil Birling
- Arthur Young as Arthur Birling
- Norman Bird as foreman Jones-Collins
- Charles Saynor as Police Sergeant Arnold Ransom
- John Welsh as Mr Timmon: hat sales manager
- Barbara Everest as Mrs Lefson, Charity Committee woman
- George Woodbridge as Stanley, fish & chip shop owner
- George Cole as conductor on tram
- Olwen Brookes as Miss Frances
- Frances Gowens as small girl in chip shop

== Production ==
An Inspector Calls was filmed at Shepperton Studios, Shepperton, Middlesex, for Watergate Productions Ltd.

== Reception ==
The Monthly Film Bulletin wrote: "Although failing to suggest an authentic period atmosphere, the director, Guy Hamilton, has produced an efficient piece of filmed theatre and has obtained highly competent performances from most of the cast; Alastair Sim, in particular, gives an expert and enjoyable performance as the Inspector, and Jane Wenham is fresh and sympathetic as Eva Smith."

C. A. Lejeune, film critic of The Observer, recommended the film; despite its lack of technical polish, its slow pace and often trite dialogue, she found it thought-provoking.

In The Radio Times Guide to Films David Parkinson gave the film 4/5 stars, writing: "It may be a gripping night out at the theatre, but JB Priestley's celebrated play loses some of its impact on screen. The revelations made by the unwelcome visitor seem so much less shocking away from the intimate confines of the stage, especially as the use of flashback to reveal the family's guilty secrets deprives us of their reactions as the truth emerges. Yet this is a highly polished production, made all the more irresistible by another superb performance from Alastair Sim."
