= Salad Days =

Salad days is an idiomatic expression originally from Shakespeare.

Salad Days may also refer to:

== Music ==
=== Albums ===
- Salad Days (Adrian Belew album)
- Salad Days (Mac DeMarco album)
- Salad Days (EP), an EP by Minor Threat, or the title song

=== Songs ===
- "Salad Days (Are Here Again)", a song by Procol Harum, from their album Procol Harum
- "Salad Days", a song by Young Marble Giants from Colossal Youth

== Films ==
- Salad Days (1958 film), an Australian TV play
- Salad Days (2014 film), a documentary by Scott Crawford

== Books ==
- Salad Days (manga), a romantic shōnen manga
- Salad Days, a novel by Charles Romalotti
- The Salad Days, volume 1 of the autobiography by Douglas Fairbanks Jr.
- Salad Days (in English translation), 1980 novel by Françoise Sagan

== Other uses ==
- Salad Days (musical), a 1954 musical by Julian Slade and Dorothy Reynolds
  - Sam Peckinpah's "Salad Days", a sketch by Monty Python's Flying Circus parodying the musical
- Salad Days, a recording studio operated by Brian McTernan

== See also ==
- Salad (disambiguation)
