= Gillian Lewis =

English actress (born 1935)

Gillian Lewis (born 1935) is an English character actress who, after a varied stage career in the 1950s and early '60s, appeared in a number of television drama series until the late 1970s. Notable roles were as the runaway heiress Geraldine Melford in the original London production of Slade and Reynolds' musical Free as Air and, on television, as Drusilla Lamb, secretary to Mr. Rose in the detective series of that name.

== Early stage career ==
Gillian Lewis was born in Tisbury, Wiltshire. She trained at the Bristol Old Vic Theatre School and then worked with the company, combining minor acting parts with the job of assistant stage manager. In 1953 she had a supporting role (Cousin Rosie) in Julian Slade and Dorothy Reynolds' Christmas musical The Merry Gentleman at the Theatre Royal, Bristol and the following year worked backstage at the Vaudeville Theatre in London when Slade and Reynolds' Salad Days transferred there from Bristol.

While working with the Ipswich Repertory Company, she met her future husband, the actor Peter Beton (born 1930).

=== Free as Air (1957) ===
In 1957, after Slade and Reynolds had enjoyed considerable acclaim with Salad Days, Lewis and Patricia Bredin (who in the same year was the United Kingdom's first ever entrant to the Eurovision Song Contest) took the main female roles in their follow-up show, Free as Air, which opened at the Savoy Theatre in London on 6 June 1957 following an initial season in Manchester. Although this and other Slade musicals never quite matched the success of Salad Days, Free as Air, which was set on the fictional Channel Island of Terhou, ran for 417 performances, some critics regarding it as more slick and professional than its predecessor. A cast recording, which includes Lewis singing a solo number, "Nothing But Sea and Sky", duets with John Trevor ("Free as Air" and "I'd Like to Be Like You") and in a trio with Josephine Tewson and Gerald Harper ("Holiday Island"), was released on compact disc in 2007. One admirer has written that her "sometimes uncertain soprano voice" was "tenuous but perched on the edge of beauty". Like Lewis, both Harper and Tewson moved successfully into television in the 1960s. Peter Beton also appeared in Free as Air.

=== Other roles ===
In the early 1960s Lewis played extensively in repertory theatre in Bristol, appearing in, among many other productions, revivals of John Dighton's The Happiest Days of Your Life (1960) (based on his screenplay for the 1949 film starring Alastair Sim and Margaret Rutherford), Noël Coward's Private Lives (1960) and Blithe Spirit (1961) and Oscar Wilde's An Ideal Husband (1960). In 1962 she played the flirtatious Natalia Snevellicci in the Bristol première of Step into the Limelight, a musical by Edgar K. Bruce and Betty Lawrence based on the Crummles theatrical troupe in Charles Dickens' novel Nicholas Nickleby. In 2004 a compact disc was released of "demo" recordings made at the time by members of the cast, with Lawrence on piano, together with ones cut in 1969 when the show was revived in Bristol with a new cast that included Josephine Gordon and Elric Cooper.

Lewis appeared also at other provincial theatres: for example, with Robert Beatty, Kynaston Reeves and Geoffrey Palmer in George Ross and Campbell Singer's Difference of Opinion at the Theatre Royal, Brighton in 1965. She returned to the West End in 1963 for the London première of Leonard Bernstein's On the Town at the Prince of Wales Theatre. In a short run, Lewis took the feisty role of Claire (the part played by Ann Miller in the 1949 film and on Broadway by the show's librettist Betty Comden) alongside two American actresses, Andrea Jaffe and Carol Arthur.

== Television in the mid-1960s ==
In the mid '60s Gillian Lewis appeared in episodes of such popular television series as Gideon's Way (1964), The Avengers (1965), Mogul (1965), Public Eye (1965) and The Baron (1966). A number of her roles, then and later, were in series that subsequently acquired "cult" status among devotees such as Department S in which she appeared in the 1968 episode One of Our Aircraft is Empty.

In the Avengers episode, "The Man-Eater of Surrey Green" (broadcast December 1965), she played Laura Burford, an old friend of Emma Peel (Diana Rigg) who was mysteriously lured away from scientific work alongside her tactile fiancé to a horticultural project aimed at propagating menacing bean-like plants with gigantic tendrils. As Joyce Grant in The Baron ("So Dark the Night", broadcast 15 March 1967), her father died in a spooky country house just before the series' eponymous hero (Steve Forrest as John Mannering) and his glamorous assistant (Sue Lloyd as Cordelia Winfield) arrived to value some antiques. This was the prelude to "an eerie web of intrigue, murder and revenge, with two girls facing hair-raising danger".

== Mr. Rose (1967) ==
In the influential Mr. Rose (Granada, 1967), starring William Mervyn as Charles Rose, an acerbic retired Scotland Yard detective, Lewis played his live-in secretary, Miss Drusilla Lamb. Drusilla was employed ostensibly to help Rose with his memoirs, although work on these was repeatedly delayed by his getting involved in unofficial investigative work.

=== Lewis as Drusilla Lamb ===
Over a series of 13 episodes produced and mostly written by Philip Mackie, Lewis portrayed Drusilla as a highly professional and, at first, rather prim, proper and somewhat icy assistant who had been through finishing school, had a shorthand speed of 150 words per minute, but was unable (so she always said) to make decent coffee. However, despite her apparent hauteur, she was also beautiful, attracting ready attention from men to whom Rose introduced her, and, in the first episode (broadcast 17 February 1967), her potential sexiness was hinted at by an unexpected scene in which Rose's manservant (Donald Webster as John Halifax) burst into her bedroom as she was about to put on a jumper over her bra and panties. Despite Drusilla's momentary loss of composure, she appeared largely unfazed by this intrusion, as also by other early incidents, such as a bomb explosion at Rose's front door and (a few years before "women's lib" began to take hold) Rose's pinching her buttocks, apparently to demonstrate that he alone was capable of shocking her. Her generally worldly and practical outlook was further corroborated by her calm demeanour at a boisterous riverboat party that culminated in a provocative striptease by a blonde teenager (Judy Geeson) who had been hired to compromise Rose. Even so, Rose thought Drusilla bossy and "refused to be nagged" by her on Sunday afternoon. She could also be quite spirited, even blunt and wilful: she was angrily defiant when held prisoner after being kidnapped, while, during a minor domestic encounter, Rose seemed amused by her telling him to "damn well do" something himself because she thought she was being treated unreasonably.

An enticing contrast with Drusilla's initial twinset image was provided by a working cruise to South Africa on which she enjoyed a romance with a suave ex-jewel thief and Halifax teased her that she was displaying too much of her cleavage while relaxing on deck. It eventually came to light that in fact her background was not as straight forward as it had seemed: specifically, she had been encouraged to apply for the job with Rose by an ex-army confidence trickster whom she believed to be her father. His unwelcome re-appearance in Drusilla's life following release from a seven-year prison sentence led both Rose, who he tried to blackmail, and Halifax, who began to emit some tender feelings for his female colleague, to take stock of their relationship with her, but then actively to stand by her. In the final episode of the series, Drusilla told Rose that she had "no private life", although it became reasonably clear that she reciprocated Halifax's apparent fondness for her.

The first series of Mr. Rose was released on DVD by Network in 2012. Lewis did not return for the second series (1968) in which Jennifer Clulow played Drusilla's successor, Jessica Dalton. In the first episode of that series, Rose recalled to Halifax that he had given Drusilla away at her wedding.

== Later TV roles ==
Lewis appeared in a number of later series, including Department S, starring Peter Wyngarde as Jason King (1969), the ground-breaking science fiction drama Doomwatch (1970), The Mind of Mr. J.G. Reeder (as Margaret Belman, a role she took over from Virginia Stride, in several episodes based on stories by Edgar Wallace, 1971), Crown Court (1972), The Duchess of Duke Street (1976) and The Mallens, adapted from the novels of Catherine Cookson (nine episodes as Jane Radlet, 1979–80).

== Films ==
Among Lewis's film credits were Ring of Spies (1964), based on the events surrounding the Portland spy ring of the early 1960s, Galton and Simpson's satirical spoof The Spy with a Cold Nose (1966) with a cast that included Laurence Harvey, Lionel Jeffries and Eric Sykes, and a TV movie Belgrove Hotel, Goodbye (1970). She also made an uncredited appearance as a television announcer in Fahrenheit 451 (1966).

Film historian Leslie Halliwell dismissed The Spy with a Cold Nose as a "rather painful, overacted and overwritten farce full of obvious jokes masquerading as satire". The essence of Lewis's role as Lady Warburton was captured in the opening sentence of Galton and Simpson's 1967 novel based on their screenplay: "To the eyes of her beholders, the beauty of Sandra, Lady Warburton, lay in strict ratio to the importance they attached to her bank balance".
