= Salad days =

English-language idiom

"Salad days" is a Shakespearean idiom referring to a period of carefree innocence, idealism, and pleasure associated with youth. The modern use describes a heyday, when a person is/was at the peak of their abilities, while not necessarily a youth.

== History ==
The phrase is attributed to William Shakespeare, who made the first known use of it in the 1606 play Antony and Cleopatra. In the speech at the end of act one in which Cleopatra is regretting her youthful dalliances with Julius Caesar she says,

"... My salad days,
When I was green in judgment, cold in blood

To say as I said then!"

The phrase became popular only from the middle of the 19th century, coming to mean "a period of youthful inexperience or indiscretion". The metaphor comes from Cleopatra's use of the word 'green' — presumably meaning someone youthful, inexperienced, or immature. Her references to "green" and "cold" both suggest qualities of salads.

Fowler's Dictionary of Modern English Usage summarizes several other possible meanings of the metaphor:

Whether the point is that youth, like salad, is raw, or that salad is highly flavoured and youth loves high flavours, or that innocent herbs are youth's food as milk is babes', and meat is men's, few of those who use the phrase could perhaps tell us; if so, it is fitter for parrots' than for human speech.

== Use ==
Queen Elizabeth II used the phrase during her silver jubilee royal address in 1977, referring to her vow to God and her people when she made her 21st birthday broadcast: "Although that vow was made in my salad days, when I was green in judgment, I do not regret nor retract one word of it."

The phrase has been used as the title of several books, including novels by Theodora Benson, Françoise Sagan, and Charles Romalotti; Douglas Fairbanks Jr.'s autobiography The Salad Days; and numerous cookbooks.

=== In film, television, and modern theatre ===
- Salad Days is a British musical by Julian Slade and lyricist Dorothy Reynolds. It premiered in the UK at the Bristol Old Vic in June 1954, and transferred to the Vaudeville Theatre, London, on 5 August 1954. One of its songs, "The Time of My Life", includes the lyrics, "We're young and we're green as the leaf on the tree / For these are our salad days."
- A sketch from Monty Python's Flying Circus is called "Salad Days," and features a parody of Slade's musical as interpreted by Sam Peckinpah.
- The phrase was used by H.I. McDonough (played by Nicolas Cage) in the Coen Brother's film Raising Arizona. H.I. states that "These were happy days, the salad days as they say" when he and his wife Ed (played by Holly Hunter) were newlyweds. Later in the film, upon discovering Ed could not bear children, H.I. states "But I preminisced no return of the salad days".
- Salad Days is the title of a documentary film released in 2014 about the evolving punk and hardcore scene in Washington, D.C. during the 1980s and 1990s. Its title derives from the 1985 Salad Days (EP) by the Washington, D.C. band Minor Threat.
- The 2010 Taiwanese drama Gloomy Salad Days is named after the expression.

=== In literature ===
In Katherine Applegate's Animorphs series, Marco says his dad Peter referred to the time before losing Eva (Marco's mom) as the "salad days", though Marco doesn't understand the reference.

In Kurt Vonnegut's 1979 novel Jailbird, the imprisoned character Walter F. Starbuck reflects on the early days of an old friendship as, "our salad days, when we were green in judgment."

=== In music ===
==== Album and song titles ====
- Procol Harum has a song on their eponymous debut album titled "Salad Days (Are Here Again)."
- In 1985, Washington, D.C., hardcore punk band Minor Threat released the song "Salad Days," reflecting on days of spirited youth in contrast to a time of adult disillusionment.
- Adrian Belew's 1999 album, Salad Days, consists of acoustic recordings of solo work as well as songs from his King Crimson era.
- Punk rock collective Bomb the Music Industry! have a song titled "Unlimited Breadsticks, Soup and Salad Days" on their 2007 album Get Warmer.
- The pop-punk / emo band Misser has a song called "Goddamn Salad Days" from their 2013 EP Distancing.
- Canadian musician Mac DeMarco's third album, released in 2014, is titled Salad Days.
- "Salad Days" is a song by the Cardiff post-punk band Young Marble Giants, including the lyric "Think of salad days, they were folly and fun, they were good, they were young."

==== In song lyrics ====
- The phrase is used in the Spandau Ballet song "Gold": "These are my salad days, slowly being eaten away."
- The idiom is used again in the opening line of the track "Lovers Who Uncover" by The Little Ones: "Where do all the lovers meet with one another, in an effort to uncover what has happened to their salad days?"
- The phrase is also used in the track "Spotlight (Oh Nostalgia)" from Patrick Stump's Truant Wave EP: "Oh, nostalgia I don't need you anymore / 'Cause the salad days are over and the meat is at my door."
- Frank Zappa's song "Electric Aunt Jemima" contains the phrase as well: "Holidays and salad days, and days of moldy mayonnaise."
- Dave Carter and Tracy Grammer use the phrase in the song "Frank to Valentino," on the album When I Go.
- Talib Kweli's song "Friends & Family" on his album Gutter Rainbows uses the phrase in reference to his early career: "Rhyming in Greenwich Village circa 1993 / Yeah those were the salad days, my career's appetizer." His song "Ms. Hill" on his album Right About Now uses the phrase, saying, "We used to kick it in the salad days, but she look at me like she don't know me when she see me nowadays."
- The Manhattan Transfer uses the phrase in their song, "Zoo Blues" which is featured on their 1987 album Brasil.
- The phrase is also used in the chorus of the track "Vince The Loveable Stoner" from The Fratellis's Costello Music album: "And I haven't seen a pupil in his eyes for 16 days, the Catholic girls love him in a hundred million different ways, and he's been up for days, in a thick malaise, he's only listened to the salad days."
- In Modest Mouse's song "Guilty Cocker Spaniels," Isaac Brock sings: "Salad days add up to daily shit".
- The song "What Would Jimi Do?" on bassist Tony Levin's album Resonator begins with the lyric "Lately, I've been thinking back, back into my salad days."
- Cursive uses the phrase on the last song of their 2006 release Happy Hollow.
- Geddy Lee refers to the phrase in Rush's 2010 documentary called Beyond the Lighted Stage.
- Green Day's song "¡Viva la Gloria!" uses the phrase: "You made your bed in salad days amongst the ruins."
- The Finn Brothers song "Edible Flowers" from 2004's Everyone Is Here album features the line "Taste the edible flowers scattered in the salad days."
- Desaparecidos' song "City on the Hill" from their 2015 record Payola includes the lyric: "All the stolen melodies they played in the hit parade / all the borrowed spirituals they fade in the salad days."
- Brand New's song "Waste" from their 2017 record Science Fiction includes the lyric: "You and I were stuck in the waste / Talking about our salad days / What a damn lie."
- Deep Purple's single "Any Fule Kno That" from their 1998 album Abandon contains the lyric "Salad days go a-tickling by / Have a high time, burn money in the meantime."
- The phrase is used in The Maddy Prior Band song Roll on the Day written by Rick Kemp, from the 1982 album Hooked on Winning. The song contains the lyric "You were easy meat in your salad days."
- The Sheila Divine's song "Black River" uses the phrase: "I guess these salad days have taken their toll."
- Half Man Half Biscuit's song "Terminus" from the 2018 album No-One Cares About Your Creative Hub So Get Your Fuckin' Hedge Cut contains the lyric "Salad days in many ways / Then time creeps up unseen / And it puts me back at the front of the bus / Hands I once held no longer there."
- Black Country, New Road's song "Salem Sisters" from the 2025 album Forever Howlong uses the phrase: "Salad days aren't balanced."
- Osees' song "Social Butt" from the 2022 album A Foul Form uses the term in the verse What makes all the devils/ Comfortably full/ Brimming over Coffers/ Spilling over tills/ Theirs are simply salad days/ No need to ask around/ Best to keep on top of them/ And wear the bastards down

== See also ==
- List of idioms attributed to Shakespeare
