= Follow That Girl =

- Original London Cast Album
- Music: Julian Slade; Dorothy Reynolds
- Lyrics: Julian Slade; Dorothy Reynolds
- Book: Julian Slade; Dorothy Reynolds
- Productions: 1960 West End

Follow That Girl is a musical adapted by Julian Slade and Dorothy Reynolds from their original Bristol Old Vic production Christmas in King Street. The story centers on a girl named Victoria Gilchrist, whose parents want her to marry one of two businessmen. She objects and runs away. Her capture after a long chase by a policeman, Tom, leads to romance and finally marriage to him. The original production contained many topical and local Bristol references — the heroine Victoria was named after the Bristol University Students Union building — but most of these were replaced when the show was revamped for its West End production.

Victoria was played by Susan Hampshire and Tom by Peter Gilmore. Others in the cast were James Cairncross – a prime collaborator with Slade and Reynolds in their musicals both as a performer and writer – Patricia Routledge, Robert MacBain and Philip Guard. Follow That Girl opened at the Vaudeville Theatre on 17 March 1960 and ran for 211 performances.

Julian Slade and Dorothy Reynolds also wrote Salad Days and Hooray for Daisy. Profits from Salad Days were donated towards the purchase of premises for the Bristol Old Vic Theatre School in 1956 and this contribution was honoured forty years later when the school's new purpose-built dance and movement studio was named after them in 1996.

== Songs ==
- "Tra La La"
- "Where shall I find my love?"
- "I'm away"
- "Follow that girl"
- "Solitary Stranger"
- "Victoria, Victoria"
- "Lost, stolen or strayed"
- "Three Victorian mermaids"
- "Mermaid scales"
- "Song and dance"
- "Let's take a stroll
- "Shopping in Kensington"
- "Taken for a ride"
- "Lovely meeting You at last"
- "Waiting for our daughter"
- "Wilbertan soap commercial"
- "Doh, Ray, Me"
