= Victoria Rooms =

Victoria Rooms may refer to:

- Victoria Rooms, Bristol, home of the University of Bristol's music department
- Victoria Rooms, heroine of the musical Follow That Girl
