= Cybill =

American television sitcom (1995–1998)

- Genre: Sitcom
- Created by: Chuck Lorre
- Starring: Cybill Shepherd; Christine Baranski; Alicia Witt; Alan Rosenberg; Dedee Pfeiffer; Tom Wopat
- Theme music composer: George Gershwin; Ira Gershwin
- Opening theme: "Nice Work if You Can Get It" by Cybill Shepherd
- Country of origin: United States
- Original language: English
- No. of seasons: 4
- No. of episodes: 87 (list of episodes)

Production
- Executive producers: Marcy Carsey; Jay Daniel; Howard M. Gould; Chuck Lorre; Caryn Mandabach; Bob Myer; Cybill Shepherd; Tom Werner
- Camera setup: Multi-camera
- Running time: 30 minutes
- Production companies: Chuck Lorre Productions; Carsey-Werner Productions; YBYL Productions

Original release
- Network: CBS
- Release: January 2, 1995 – July 13, 1998

Cybill is an American television sitcom created by Chuck Lorre, which aired for four seasons and 87 episodes on CBS from January 2, 1995, to July 13, 1998. Starring Cybill Shepherd, the show revolves around the life of Cybill Sheridan, a twice-divorced single mother of two and struggling actress in her 40s who has never gotten her big break in show business. Alicia Witt and Dedee Pfeiffer co-starred as Sheridan's daughters, with Alan Rosenberg and Tom Wopat playing their respective fathers, while Christine Baranski appeared as Cybill's hard-drinking friend Maryann.

The sitcom was produced by Chuck Lorre Productions and YBYL Productions in association with Carsey-Werner Productions, with Shepherd, Lorre, Howard M. Gould, Jay Daniel, Caryn Mandabach, Marcy Carsey, and Tom Werner serving as the show's original executive producers. Broadcast to critical praise, Cybill was nominated for 12 Emmy Awards throughout its run and awarded the 1996 Golden Globe Award for Best Television Series – Musical or Comedy. Shepherd won a third Golden Globe Award for her performance, while Baranski received an Emmy, a Screen Actors Guild Award, and an American Comedy Award. Cybill has been in syndication on the comedy-centric digital subchannel Laff since April 2016, along with other Carsey-Werner Productions series shown on the network.

== Plot ==
Cybill takes place in Los Angeles and focuses on the character of a somewhat faded actress, Cybill Sheridan (played by Cybill Shepherd), who, because of her age, had been relegated to playing character roles, bit parts, and TV commercials. Also featured are her daughters: headstrong Zoey (Witt) and uptight Rachel (Pfeiffer), two ex-husbands: Ira (Rosenberg) and Jeff (Wopat), and her hard-drinking best friend Maryann (Baranski).

Due to the show's premise, many episodes featured a show-within-a-show format, usually in the cold opens, showing Cybill Sheridan playing a variety of other characters in her various film and TV acting roles.

In her autobiography, Cybill Disobedience, Shepherd stated that the Cybill character was based on herself—or at least what her life as an actress could have been without the successes of The Last Picture Show and Moonlighting. Many of the show's details and situations were mined from her own family, marriages, and experiences.

== Cast and characters ==
=== Regular and semi-regular ===
- Cybill Shepherd as Cybill Sheridan – Cybill is a middle aged actress who has had a varied, though mediocre career (which, even in her salad days, seems to have consisted primarily of television commercials, soap operas, and B-movies). She now finds that, due to her age, roles are becoming harder to find and that the quality of roles she is offered is diminishing. Her fortunes seem to vary over the course of the series. Sometimes, she has consistent work and appears to be relatively wealthy, other times, she scrambles to find and keep jobs, and seems to be struggling financially; this inconsistency could be attributed to the nature of her career, as even the most successful actors tend to have their professional ups and downs, both financially and creatively. Cybill is a rather eccentric feminist who practices New Age philosophy, as well as a native Southerner from Memphis, Tennessee. Her loud, public, and honest rantings about female sexuality, her perkiness, bouts of outrage, and hysteria, and her exhibitions of "down-home" Southern behavior often embarrass her two daughters, Zoey and Rachel. Cybill has a civil relationship with her ex-husbands Jeff and Ira, even tolerating their tendency to cling to her. She does sometimes spar, however, with Jeff over his past infidelities, and is quick to remind Ira of how controlling he was when they were married. Cybill's best friend is the wealthy, alcoholic divorcee Maryann Thorpe, whom she supports emotionally and assists in her bitter war with her ex-husband. Cybill has a caustic sense of humor and an acid tongue. Although eccentric and flawed, Cybill's strength and wisdom shines through in her support of her family and friends. (87 episodes)
- Christine Baranski as Maryann Thorpe – Cybill's best friend is a former receptionist who is now fabulously wealthy due to her divorce settlement with her unfaithful ex-husband, celebrity plastic surgeon Richard Thorpe (an infrequently and never fully seen character, to whom she always refers with a sneer as "Dr. Dick"). Maryann is a bored, bitter alcoholic who often seems unstable and emotionally dependent on Cybill. When she is not stalking her ex-husband and playing elaborate and destructive pranks on him, she spends lavishly, drinks, and pursues younger men. She has a few healthy relationships with men of her own age over the course of the series, including Cybill's ex-husband Ira, but these do not last. She has a son, Justin (Danny Masterson), who infrequently visits. A passionate environmentalist with excessive liberal beliefs, Justin is at odds with her frivolous and extravagant lifestyle. Maryann's most consistent and healthy relationship is with Cybill. They seem to be endlessly sharing martinis in an upmarket Hollywood restaurant and are accomplices in each other's bad behavior. Maryann seems to spend most of her time at Cybill's house and involving herself in Cybill's family life to alleviate her own boredom. Her caustic tongue vies with Cybill's, but her remarks are more inappropriate, bitter, and cynical. She is, however, a constant support for Cybill at crucial moments. Her first name was Theresa, which her mother called her but she dropped when she moved to Los Angeles. (87 episodes)
- Alicia Witt as Zoey Woodbine – Cybill's younger daughter, she is a high-school teenager, and is brilliant, rebellious, and more sarcastic than her mother. She is a piano virtuoso (as is Witt) and hopes to attend the Los Angeles Conservatory of Music. A self-imposed outcast, she is a vocal advocate of celibacy. She is in an on-again-off-again relationship with Maryann's estranged son. (87 episodes)
- Alan Rosenberg as Ira Woodbine – Cybill's second husband, Ira is the polar opposite of Cybill's first husband, Jeff. Unassuming and rather neurotic, he is a brilliant writer, though prone to "writer's block". His marriage to Cybill ended because he was unable to stop trying to control her life; even in divorce, he cannot help meddling in her life. For several episodes of the second season he was involved with Maryann. (85 episodes)
- Dedee Pfeiffer as Rachel Robbins Manning – Cybill's elder daughter, she is uptight and pretentious, and is married to Kevin Manning. She is prone to outbursts of hysteria similar to her mother's, especially during her pregnancies of the first and fourth season. Rachel and Kevin's first child is a boy named William; the second is a girl, Amanda. (Initially a regular but the role became more semi-regular in later seasons) (42 episodes)
- Tom Wopat as Jeff Robbins – Cybill's first husband, Jeff is a Hollywood stuntman with a roving eye. Though his many indiscretions were the cause of the divorce, Cybill and Jeff still have a good relationship, bound together by their daughter and grandson (and the fact that Jeff lived over Cybill's garage in the early seasons of the show). Jeff is somewhat dim, making him a prime target for Zoey's dry wit, but possesses a good heart. (Initially a regular in first couple of seasons, semi-regular in later seasons) (22 episodes)

=== Recurring and special guests ===
- Tim Maculan as a waiter and friend of Cybill's. Despite his prominence, the character was never given a name. Appeared in over 50 episodes (the fifth-most appearing cast member with more episodes than some of the semi-regular cast).
- Peter Krause as Kevin Manning, Rachel's equally uptight husband, an untenured assistant professor from Boston. (Recurring from Season 2 onwards) (23 episodes)
- Jay Paulson as Sean, Zoe's first boyfriend in Season 2 & 3. (Recurring) (12 episodes)
- Ray Baker as the second Dr. Richard Thorpe, Maryann's veterinarian boyfriend who is also the namesake of her ex-husband. (Recurring in Seasons 3 & 4) (11 episodes)
- Jane Kaczmarek as Holly, Ira's girlfriend - and later fiancee - in Season 3. (5 episodes)
- Linda Wallem appeared in 5 episodes as various characters including Julie, Cybill's co-host on a morning show in 3 episodes. Wallem was also a producer and writer on the show.
- Mary Page Keller as Julia Bishop, Zoey's piano teacher and Ira's girlfriend. (4 episodes)
- Kim Murphy as Nina, Zoey's friend and one-time roommate. (4 episodes)
- Morgan Fairchild as Andrea Thorpe, Cybill's rival and later wife of Maryann's often mentioned but never seen husband, Dr. Dick. She and Cybill have mutual enmity which has resulted in personal humiliations, professional loss, and injury on both sides. (4 episodes)
- Audra Lindley as Virginia Sheridan, Cybill's mother. (3 episodes and another episode dedicated in her honour)
- Florence Stanley as Ruth Woodbine, Ira's mother and Zoey's grandmother, who had a friendly relationship with Cybill and once posed as Maryann's mother. (3 episodes)
- Eileen Heckart as Marge, Maryann's mother. (3 episodes)
- Dick O'Neill as Roy, Maryann's father. (3 episodes)
- Jeff Foxworthy as Lyle Clocum, Cybill's Price Is Right obsessed cousin. (1 episode)

Additionally, many prominent actors appeared playing themselves, often humorous or self-deprecating caricatures of their real personas. These included Jonathan Frakes, Joan Van Ark, Dick Van Patten, Burt Reynolds, and Cybill Shepherd's real-life ex-partner, director Peter Bogdanovich.

== Episodes ==
Season	Episodes	Originally released	
Season	Episodes	First released	Last released
1	13	January 2, 1995	May 15, 1995
2	24	September 17, 1995	May 20, 1996
3	26	September 16, 1996	May 19, 1997
4	24	September 15, 1997	July 13, 1998

== Ratings ==
=== Average seasonal ratings ===
Season		Time slot (ET)	Premiere	Finale	Season rank	Viewers (millions)
1	1994–1995	Monday at 9:30 pm	January 2, 1995	May 15, 1995	#22	12.8
2	1995–1996	Sunday at 8:00 pm (Episodes 1–11, 13–16, 18–20); Monday at 9:30 pm (Episode 12); Sunday at 8:30 pm (Episode 17, 21–24)	September 17, 1995	May 20, 1996	#50	10.0
3	1996–1997	Monday at 9:30 pm (Episodes 1–18); Monday at 9:00 pm (Episodes 19–26)	September 16, 1996	May 19, 1997	#30	10.5
4	1997–1998	Monday at 9:00 pm (Episodes 1–12, 18–21); Wednesday at 8:30 pm (Episodes 13–17); Monday at 9:30 pm (Episodes 22–24)	September 15, 1997	July 13, 1998	#50	8.3

== Cancellation ==
The series got respectable (though never spectacular) ratings throughout most of its run, but was abruptly canceled by CBS at the end of the 1997–98 season after a noticeable ratings decline. The show was actually pulled from the CBS schedule after the April 8, 1998, episode had aired; the remaining new episodes that had already been produced were aired over the summer. Shepherd later alleged that the cancellation occurred because the network was uncomfortable with Cybill's feminist leanings and frank depiction of female sexuality.

The cancellation was not expected by the show's staff, as the series ends with a cliffhanger and the words "To Be Continued..." on the screen. At the time of its cancellation, the show's ratings were higher than Nash Bridges (1996–2001) and Chicago Hope (1994–2000); those shows continued to air on CBS. In 2018, Shepherd claimed that Les Moonves hit on her during a dinner date, but she refused him. As a result, she said, he soon interfered with the series' concepts, and ultimately canceled the show.

== Awards and nominations ==
Cybill was nominated for twelve Emmy Awards throughout its entire run, winning three. Nominated for her performance in each season, Baranski was the only cast member to win an Emmy. Baranski also received an American Comedy Award, a Screen Actors Guild Award and a Viewers for Quality Television Award for her portrayal, while Shepherd was awarded the 1996 Golden Globe Award for Best Actress – Television Series Musical or Comedy. The same year, the sitcom also won the Golden Globe Award for Best Television Series – Musical or Comedy, its only win for both the crew and the cast.

Award	Year	Category	Recipients	Result	Ref.
American Comedy Awards	1996	Funniest Supporting Female Performer in a TV Series	Christine Baranski	Won	
GLAAD Media Awards	1997	Outstanding TV - Individual Episode	"Cybill and Maryann Go to Japan"	Nominated	
Golden Globe Awards	1996	Best Television Series – Musical or Comedy		Won	
Golden Globe Awards	1996	Best Actress – Television Series Musical or Comedy	Cybill Shepherd	Won	
Golden Globe Awards	1996	Best Supporting Actress – Series, Miniseries or Television Film	Christine Baranski	Nominated	
Golden Globe Awards	1997	Best Actress – Television Series Musical or Comedy	Cybill Shepherd	Nominated	
Golden Globe Awards	1997	Best Supporting Actress – Series, Miniseries or Television Film	Christine Baranski	Nominated	
Online Film & Television Association Awards	1997	Best Supporting Actress in a Series	Christine Baranski	Nominated	
Online Film & Television Association Awards	1997	Best Actress in a Comedy Series	Cybill Shepherd	Nominated	
Online Film & Television Association Awards	1997	Best Supporting Actress in a Comedy Series	Christine Baranski	Nominated	
Online Film & Television Association Awards	1998	Best Actress in a Comedy Series	Cybill Shepherd	Nominated	
Online Film & Television Association Awards	1998	Best Supporting Actress in a Comedy Series	Christine Baranski	Nominated	
Primetime Emmy Awards	1995	Outstanding Lead Actress in a Comedy Series	Cybill Shepherd	Nominated	
Primetime Emmy Awards	1995	Outstanding Supporting Actress in a Comedy Series	Christine Baranski	Won	
Primetime Emmy Awards	1995	Outstanding Individual Achievement in Art Direction for a Series	Garvin Eddy and Rochelle Moser	Won	
Primetime Emmy Awards	1995	Outstanding Individual Achievement in Costume Design for a Series	Robert Turturice	Nominated	
Primetime Emmy Awards	1996	Outstanding Lead Actress in a Comedy Series	Cybill Shepherd	Nominated	
Primetime Emmy Awards	1996	Outstanding Supporting Actress in a Comedy Series	Christine Baranski	Nominated	
Primetime Emmy Awards	1996	Outstanding Individual Achievement in Art Direction for a Series	Garvin Eddy and Rochelle Moser	Nominated	
Primetime Emmy Awards	1996	Outstanding Costume Design for a Series	Marion Kirk, Daniel Grant North and Leslie Simmons Potts	Won	
Primetime Emmy Awards	1996	Outstanding Sound Mixing For A Comedy Series Or A Special	Jerry Clemans, Edward L. Moskowitz and Craig Porter	Nominated	
Primetime Emmy Awards	1997	Outstanding Lead Actress in a Comedy Series	Cybill Shepherd	Nominated	
Primetime Emmy Awards	1997	Outstanding Supporting Actress in a Comedy Series	Christine Baranski	Nominated	
Primetime Emmy Awards	1998	Outstanding Supporting Actress in a Comedy Series	Christine Baranski	Nominated	
Satellite Awards	1997	Best Television Series – Musical or Comedy		Nominated	
Satellite Awards	1997	Best Actress – Television Series Musical or Comedy	Cybill Shepherd	Nominated	
Screen Actors Guild Awards	1996	Outstanding Performance by a Female Actor in a Comedy Series	Christine Baranski	Won	
Screen Actors Guild Awards	1996	Outstanding Performance by an Ensemble in a Comedy Series	Christine Baranski, Dedee Pfeiffer, Alan Rosenberg, Cybill Shepherd, Alicia Witt and Tom Wopat	Nominated	
Screen Actors Guild Awards	1997	Outstanding Performance by a Female Actor in a Comedy Serie	Christine Baranski	Nominated	
Viewers for Quality Television Awards	1996	Best Actress in a Quality Comedy Series	Cybill Shepherd	Nominated	
Viewers for Quality Television Awards	1996	Best Supporting Actress in a Quality Comedy Series	Christine Baranski	Won	
Viewers for Quality Television Awards	1997	Best Supporting Actress in a Quality Comedy Series	Christine Baranski	Nominated	

== Home media ==
=== Region 1 ===
On September 16, 2008, First Look Studios released Cybill: The Collector's Edition, Vol. 1, a 2-disc best of DVD.

=== Region 2 ===
Anchor Bay Entertainment has released the entire series on DVD in the UK.

DVD Name	Ep#	Release Date
The Complete First Series	13	24 April 2006
The Complete Second Series	24	2 July 2007
The Complete Third Series	26	5 May 2008
The Complete Fourth Series	24	4 August 2008
The Complete Box Set	87	29 September 2008
