= Ensalada =

Ensalada is the Spanish word for salad.

Ensalada may refer to:

- Ensalada (music), a Spanish Renaissance compositional form similar to the quodlibet
- Kinilaw, also called ensalada, various types of salads from the Philippines
  - Kinilnat, an Ilocano vegetable salad

== See also ==
- Ensalada chilena, a Chilean vegetable salad
- Ensalada criolla, a 1905 film directed by Eugene Py
- “Ensalada”, a song on the 2025 album Alfredo 2 by Freddie Gibbs and The Alchemist
- Salad (disambiguation)
