= Free as Air =

Musical by Julian Slade and Dorothy Reynolds

- Music: Julian Slade
- Lyrics: Dorothy Reynolds; Julian Slade
- Book: Dorothy Reynolds; Julian Slade
- Productions: 1957 West End

Free as Air is a musical with lyrics by Dorothy Reynolds and Julian Slade and music by Julian Slade. They are the same team responsible for the much better known musical Salad Days, although Free as Air is said to be "more slick and professional by some critics". The musical is still performed, particularly by amateur companies with large casts and choruses.

== Production ==
Free as Air opened at the Opera House in Manchester before moving to the West End at the Savoy Theatre on 6 June 1957, where it ran for 417 performances, quite a good run at that time. The musical was directed by Denis Carey. The original cast recording plus bonus tracks is available on CD from Sepia records. Among the cast were Gerald Harper and Gillian Lewis, both of whom later became well known on television, and Patricia Bredin who, also in 1957, represented the United Kingdom in the Eurovision Song Contest.

== Setting ==
Free as Air is an original story of two days in May on Terhou, a minor "and totally fictitious" Channel Island, based on the small island of Sark in the Channel Island archipelago in the English Channel. Like Terhou, Sark has its own independent parliament known as The Chief Pleas, and its own lord, the Seigneur of Sark. It is accessible only by boat with no cars allowed, only bicycles, tractors and horses and carts. Islanders refer to England as "the mainland".

Free as Air was partly written on the southern part of Sark known as Little Sark at La Sablonnerie hotel, which has photos and notes from the Gillian Lewis. The cover image for the album is based on the view looking north west towards the distinctive shape of Herm on the left of the image from the beach at Port du Moulin on Sark.

Coincidentally, an attempt was made in the mid 2000s to turn Sark into a luxury resort by David and Frederick Barclay, who own the tiny neighbouring island of Brecqhou, but this failed after opposition from islanders, and the brothers subsequently closed their hotels on Sark in 2014.

== Synopsis ==
The islanders arise early to prepare for their annual Independence Day (I'm Up Early). They discover there is no young lady to be the Queen in their Coronation Ceremony because everyone has played the part before. Parliament (Lord Paul, Mr Mutch, Mr Potter) proposes a new law but the members are glad of an excuse to stop work (Let The Grass Grow).

The Terhou boat returns from its monthly visit to the mainland bringing the usual imports—and a stranger, Geraldine (Nothing But Sea and Sky). The Islanders meet her and unload the boat (The Boat's In).

Geraldine is welcomed as a possible solution to the coronation problem but her presence disturbs Molly, an island girl.

Molly gazes past the horizon and yearns for a man as handsome as Geraldine is beautiful (A Man From The Mainland).

Albert, Lord Paul's nephew, shows Geraldine round the island. She tells him she is wealthy and has run away from a suitor, Jack Amersham, and from the paparazzi, which have made her unwillingly famous. The Islanders legally adopt her and teach her the Coronation song (Free As Air).

Geraldine feels safe but on Jersey her absence has been discovered by Jack Amersham and by Ivy Crush, the press reporter who has been detailed to shadow her.

Jack lightly mourns Geraldine’s escape and of all the other girls in his life (Her Mummy Doesn't Like Me Any More). Meanwhile, Lord Paul has run away in a frenzy to Jersey: he has tried to propose to Miss Catamole and been laughed at and humiliated. Easy prey, he is persuaded to take Jack and Ivy to Terhou.

Geraldine's privacy and the peace of Terhou are threatened (The Girl From London).

The Island girls, led by Molly, fall in love with Jack on sight (A Man From The Mainland). Geraldine tells Jack she can never marry him and there is a gently growing sympathy between her and Albert (I'd Like To Be Like You).

Lord Paul, captivated by Ivy's admiration of him, shows her round the Island. The Islanders sing her a folk song which tells the story of the Roman occupation (Testudo).

Jack half-responds to Molly's uninhibited advances and consents to take her to London (I've Got My Feet On The Ground).

Ivy almost persuades the Islanders to turn Terhou into a lucrative pleasure resort; Geraldine, Jack and Albert point out what their life would be like (Holiday Island) and the Islanders realise that Ivy is a menace and imprison her. But it is too late: she reveals that she has already reported to her newspaper and Geraldine, broken-hearted, leaves the island to save it from publicity.

She meets the reporters on Jersey (Geraldine). The islanders appear, posing as Geraldine's relations among whom she has divided her money. The reporters think she is now penniless and lose interest. Geraldine is safe to return to Terhou.

Mr. Potter, coached by Geraldine, has proposed to Miss Catamole after fifteen years' procrastination (We're Holding Hands). Ivy is forgiven and consents to marry Lord Paul. The Coronation Ceremony takes place with Geraldine as Queen (Terhou).

Molly, after a glimpse of the mainland, decides to stay where she is; Jack leaves Terhou on his own.

== Musical numbers ==
- I'm Up Early (Molly and Islanders)
- Let The Grass Grow (Mutch, Potter and Lord Paul)
- Nothing But Sea And Sky (Geraldine)
- The Boat's In (Islanders)
- A Man From The Mainland (Molly)
- Free As Air (Albert, Geraldine and Islanders)
- Daily Echo (high)
- Her Mummy Doesn't Like Me Any More (Jack and Chorus)
- The Girl From London (The Company)
- A Man From The Mainland (Reprise) (The Company)

Act 2

- A Man From The Mainland (Reprise) (Molly, Jack and Island Girls)
- I'd Like To Be Like You (Albert and Geraldine)
- Testudo (Mutch, Molly, Bindweed and Islanders)
- Feet On The Ground (Molly and Jack)
- Holiday Island (Ivy, Geraldine, Jack, Albert and Islanders)
- Geraldine (The Reporters)
- Free to Sing (Reprise) (Chorus)
- We're Holding Hands (Potter and Miss Catamole)
- Terhou (Molly and Company)
- Finale and Reprises (The Company)

== Original cast ==
- Molly - Patricia Bredin
- Mr Mutch - Roy Godfrey
- Mr Potter - Howard Goorney
- Miss Catamole - Dorothy Reynolds
- Lord Paul Posthumous - Michael Aldridge
- Albert Posthumous - John Trevor
- Bindweed – Vincent Charles
- Gregory - Donald Bradley
- Connie - Joyce Carpenter
- Tom Ferrier - Bill Tasker
- Geraldine Melford - Gillian Lewis
- Ivy Crush – Josephine Tewson
- Jack Amersham – Gerald Harper
- Reporters – Malcolm Farquhar, Len Rossiter, Raymond Parks
