= The Treasure of Monte Cristo =

1961 British film by Robert S. Baker and Monty Berman

- American poster
- Directed by: Robert S. Baker; Monty Berman
- Written by: Leon Griffiths
- Produced by: Robert S. Baker; Monty Berman
- Starring: Rory Calhoun; Patricia Bredin; John Gregson; Gianna Maria Canale
- Cinematography: Robert S. Baker; Monty Berman
- Edited by: John Jympson
- Music by: Clifton Parker
- Production company: Mid Century Film Productions
- Distributed by: Metro-Goldwyn-Mayer
- Release date: 22 June 1961
- Running time: 95 minutes
- Country: United Kingdom
- Language: English

The Treasure of Monte Cristo (U.S. title: The Secret of Monte Cristo ) is a 1961 British historical adventure film directed by Monty Berman and Robert S. Baker and starring Rory Calhoun, Patricia Bredin and John Gregson. The story, by Leon Griffiths, is a prequel to Alexandre Dumas' 1844 novel The Count of Monte Cristo.

The Treasure of Monte Cristo is also the name as an unofficial sequel novel to The Count of Monte Cristo, written by Jules Lermina in 1885.

== Plot ==
In 1815, an army captain goes off in search of a treasure on the island of Monte Cristo.

== Cast ==
- Rory Calhoun as Captain Adam Corbett
- Patricia Bredin as Pauline
- John Gregson as Renato
- Peter Arne as Boldini
- Ian Hunter as Colonel Jackson
- David Davies as Van Ryman
- Sam Kydd as Albert
- Francis Matthews as Louis Auclair
- Gianna Maria Canale as Lucetta Di Marca

== Reception ==
The Monthly Film Bulletin wrote: "Minor, slow-starting perversion of the Monte Cristo theme and spirit, with an intolerably moral ending. Rory Calhoun and Patricia Bredin make an uninspiring romantic team, and Gianna Maria Canale is gloomily expendable as Boldini's double-crossing mistress. But David Davies is a likably sturdy sea-dog, John Gregson enjoys himself hugely in an eye-rolling caricature of a Justy, laughing knife-man, and the Italian locations are frequently handsome."

Kine Weekly wrote: "Period action melodrama, finely photographed in Dyaliscope and Eastman Color. Its plot, concerned with a ding-dong fight over buried treasure on a Mediterranean island, eschews subtlety, but vigorous acting and forthright direction give the obvious a keen edge. There are scraps and chases galore, bold and treacherous characters of both sexes, many neat comedy touches and a slap-up climax.

The Hollywood Reporter wrote: "The Secret of Monte Cristo, an MGM release made in Europe, has few secrets about it, being one predictable situation after another handled with little finesse or excitement. ... The film is a classic example of how much at the mercy of producers and directors even the most experienced star can be, a special hazard of foreign filming. ... The picture has many of the faults of the old-fashioned western, chases on horseback, derring-do in which the end is easily foreseen, chivalrous bandit chiefs, comic servants, and runaway coaches. There is little suspense or character conflict of real impression."

Variety wrote: "The Secret of Monte Cristo is the British equivalent of the old-fashioned American western. The hero wears a starched collar instead of a 10-gallon chapeau and brandishes a sword instead of a six shooter. Otherwise the setting might just as well be 1860 Texas as 1815 England. Whereas, however, the American western has recently gone high hat, adult and psychological, this little number from Metro's British unit is a throwback to the non-cerebral adventure epic of yesteryear, complete with every cliche from runaway coach horses halted at cliffside to the comic manservant who conks his master on the noggin with a barrel when aiming for the villain's bean in a titanic fistfight in yon inn. All of which makes it an ideal conglomeration of freewheeling good-natured, lower berth pap for juniors with a healthy appetite for derring-do.
