= Bill James (novelist) =

Welsh novelist (1929–2023)

Bill James (15 August 1929 – 17 June 2023) was a pseudonym of Allan James Tucker, a Welsh novelist. He also wrote under his own name and the pseudonyms David Craig and Judith Jones. He was a reporter with the Daily Mirror and various other newspapers after serving with the RAF He was married, with four children, and lived in South Wales.

The bulk of his output under the Bill James pseudonym is the Harpur and Iles series. Colin Harpur is a Detective Chief Superintendent and Desmond Iles is the Assistant Chief Constable in an unnamed coastal city in southwestern England. Harpur and Iles are complemented by an evolving cast of other recurring characters on both sides of the law. The books are characterized by a grim humour and a bleak view of the relationship between the public, the police force and the criminal element. The first few are designated "A Detective Colin Harpur Novel" but as the series progressed they began to be published with the designation "A Harpur & Iles Mystery".

His novel Whose Little Girl are You, written under the "David Craig" pseudonym, was filmed as The Squeeze, starring Stacy Keach, Edward Fox and David Hemmings. The fourth Harpur & Iles novel, Protection, was televised by the BBC in 1996 as Harpur & Iles, starring Aneirin Hughes as Harpur and Hywel Bennett as Iles.

== Works as Bill James ("Detective Colin Harpur" and "Harpur & Iles" novels) ==
- You'd Better Believe It, 1985
- The Lolita Man, 1986
- Halo Parade, 1987
- Protection 1988, also published as Harpur & Iles 1992
- Come Clean, 1989
- Take, 1990
- Club, 1991
- Astride a Grave, 1991
- Gospel, 1992
- Roses, Roses, 1993
- In Good Hands, 1994
- The Detective is Dead, 1995
- Top Banana, 1996
- Panicking Ralph, 1997
- Lovely Mover, 1998
- Eton Crop, 1999
- Kill Me, 2000
- Pay Days, 2001
- Naked at the Window, 2002
- The Girl with the Long Back, 2003
- Easy Streets, 2004
- Wolves of Memory, 2005
- Girls, 2006
- Pix, 2007
- In the Absence of Iles, 2008
- Hotbed, 2009
- I Am Gold, 2010
- Vacuum, 2011
- Undercover, 2012
- Play Dead, 2013
- Disclosures, 2014
- Blaze Away, 2015
- First Fix Your Alibi, 2016
- Close, 2017
- Hitmen I Have Known, 2019
- Low Pastures, 2022

== Works as Bill James ("Simon Abelard" novels) ==
- Split, 2001
- A Man's Enemies, 2003

== Works as Bill James (other) ==
- The Last Enemy, 1997
- Double jeopardy (a Kerry Lake novel - see Judith Jones, below), 2002
- Middleman, 2002
- Between Lives, 2003
- Making Stuff Up, 2006
- The Sixth Man and other Stories (short stories, includes Harpur and Iles stories), 2006
- Letters from Carthage, 2007
- Off-street Parking, 2008
- Full of Money, 2009
- World War Two Will Not Take Place, 2011
- Noose, 2013
- Snatched, 2014
- The Principals, 2016

== Works as David Craig ("Roy Rickman" novels) ==
- The Alias Man, 1968 (1968)
- Message Ends, 1969 (1969)
- Contact Lost, 1970 (1970)

== Works as David Craig ("Bellecroix and Roath" novels) ==
- Young Men May Die, 1970 (1970)
- A Walk at Night, 1971 (1971)

== Works as David Craig ("Brade and Jenkins" novels) ==
- Forget it, (1995)
- The Tattoed Detective, (1998)
- Torch, (1999)
- Bay City, (2000)

== Works as David Craig ("Sally Bithron" novels) ==
- Hear me Talking to You, (2005)
- Tip Top, (2006)

== Works as David Craig (other) ==
- Up from the Grave, 1971 (1971)
- Double Take, 1972 (1972)
- Bolthole (US title: Knifeman), 1973 (1973)
- A Dead Liberty, 1974 (1974)
- Whose Little Girl are You? (US title: The Squeeze), 1974 (1974)
- The Albion Case, 1975 (1975)
- Faith, Hope and Death, 1976 (1976)

== Works as Judith Jones ("Kerry Lake" novels) ==
- Baby Talk, (1998)
- After Melissa, (1999)

== Works as James Tucker (fiction) ==
- Equal Partners, (1960)
- The Right Hand Man, (1961)
- Burster, (1966)
- Blaze of Riot, 1979 (1979)
- The King's Friends, (1982)

== Works as James Tucker (non-fiction) ==
- Honourable Estates, (1966)
- The Novels of Anthony Powell, 1976 (1976)

Dates given without parentheses are the Library of Congress publication dates, usually the first US publication, except where the books do not (yet) appear in the Library of Congress Online Catalog. The dates in parentheses are the copyright dates, taken from the actual books when available.
