= Peter Arne =

British actor (1924–1983)

- Born: Peter Randolph Michael Albrecht; 29 September 1918; Kuala Lumpur, Malaya
- Died: 1 August 1983 (aged 64); Knightsbridge, London, England
- Cause of death: Homicide
- Occupation: Actor
- Years active: 1944-1983

Peter Arne (born Peter Randolph Michael Albrecht; 29 September 1918 – 1 August 1983) was a British actor. He made more than 50 film appearances including roles in Ice Cold in Alex, The Moonraker, Conspiracy of Hearts and Victor/Victoria. In a career that spanned 40 years he also appeared on stage and had supporting roles in the television series The Avengers, Danger Man, Department S, as well as villains in several of the Blake Edwards' Pink Panther series of films.

Arne was murdered in August 1983. He was found, beaten to death, inside his Knightsbridge flat.

== Career ==
Arne was born in Kuala Lumpur, British Malaya, to a Swiss-French mother and an American father, and gained his early acting experience in British provincial repertory. In 1953, the New Lindsey Theatre Club performed his play No Stranger.

From the mid-1950s onwards, he developed a successful career playing a broad range of supporting roles in both film and television often with a specialisation in playing unsmiling villains and German officers. In addition to acting, he ran his own antiques business.

In 1968, he played the roles of the prisoner known as the Duke, as well as Dr. Sanson Carrasco, in the London stage production of Man of La Mancha. (The two roles were played by John Castle in the 1972 film version of the musical.)

In the 1960s and 1970s, Arne was a busy character actor on television. He appeared in several ITC adventure series and in four episodes of The Avengers as different characters each time and two episodes of Department S in different roles. He was also in The Protectors in 1972. He appeared in the last two episodes of Secret Army (1979) as a German Colonel, and as a regular in series two of Triangle in 1982.

== Embezzling funds from Mary Renault ==
In the late 1940s, Arne and his partner at the time, Jack Corke, befriended English novelist Mary Renault and her partner, Julie Mullard, on the SS Cairo, a steamer bound from Britain to South Africa.

Arne (aged 26 at the time) and Corke persuaded Mary Renault that they could get rich quickly by building housing for recent immigrants like themselves. The four of them established a company called CAM Construction, which Renault financed using a £37,000 award she had received from the movie studio Metro-Goldwyn-Mayer, and the company began employing labourers and craftsmen to begin construction of several houses.

Arne and Corke (an alcoholic) squandered funds on high living, leaving bills unpaid, and the company failed to generate revenue. After Arne and Corke stole Renault's Studebaker, her lawyer obtained their resignations from the firm and persuaded them to leave the house the four had formerly shared. Arne and Corke then disappeared from Renault's life for good and Arne returned to Britain.

== Death ==
On 1 August 1983, Arne attended a costume fitting in Clerkenwell intended for his character Range in the BBC Doctor Who television serial Frontios (a role which would eventually be played by William Lucas).

Shortly after Arne returned to his Knightsbridge home, neighbours reported hearing a violent argument coming from his home. Arne was later found inside his flat, bludgeoned to death with a stool and a log from his fireplace, which was found in the communal hall.

The prime suspect in Arne's murder was a schoolteacher from Verona, Italy, who had been living rough in a local park, and for whom Arne had been providing food.

Police issued a photofit image after eyewitnesses reported seeing a young man loitering nearby eating a jar of honey. Four days later, a body matching this description was found in the River Thames at Wandsworth, having drowned in an apparent suicide. Bloodstained clothes were later found upstream at Putney. Police identified the body as that of Giuseppe Perusi, an Italian schoolteacher. Inquiries revealed Arne had been giving food to Perusi.

An inquest at Westminster Coroner's Court in October 1983 recorded a verdict of unlawful killing for Arne and suicide for Perusi. Police concluded that Perusi had beaten the actor to death then killed himself. The reason for the violent argument and the motive for the killing remain unknown.

== Filmography ==
=== Film ===
- For Those in Peril (1944) as Junior officer (uncredited)
- You Know What Sailors Are (1954) as Ahmed
- The Purple Plain (1954) as Flight Lieutenant (uncredited)
- The Men of Sherwood Forest (1954)
- Mystery on Bird Island (1954) as Henri
- Timeslip (1955) as Dr. Stephen Rayner / Jarvis
- The Cockleshell Heroes (1955) as Marine Stevens
- Tarzan and the Lost Safari (1957) as Dick Penrod
- High Tide at Noon (1957) as Owen MacKenzie
- Strangers' Meeting (1957) as Harry Belair
- The Moonraker (1958) as Edmund Tyler
- Ice Cold in Alex (1958) as British Officer at Oasis
- Intent to Kill (1958) as Kral
- Danger Within (1959) as Capitano Benucci
- Scent of Mystery (1960) as Robert Fleming
- Conspiracy of Hearts (1960) as Lt. Schmidt
- Sands of the Desert (1960) as Sheikh El Jabez
- The Hellfire Club (1961) as Thomas, Earl of Netherden
- A Story of David (1961) as Doeg
- The Treasure of Monte Cristo (1961) as Boldini
- The Pirates of Blood River (1962) as Hench, a pirate
- Girl in the Headlines (1963) as Hammond Barker
- The Victors (1963)
- The Black Torment (1964) as Seymour
- Khartoum (1966) as Maj. Kitchener
- The Sandwich Man (1966) as Gentleman in Rolls-Royce
- Battle Beneath the Earth (1967) as Arnold Kramer
- Chitty Chitty Bang Bang (1968) as Captain of Bomburst
- The Oblong Box (1969) as Trench
- When Eight Bells Toll (1971) as Capt. Imrie
- Murders in the Rue Morgue (1971) as Aubert
- Straw Dogs (1971) as John Niles
- Antony and Cleopatra (1972) as Menas
- Nobody Ordered Love (1972) as Leo Richardstone
- Pope Joan (1972) as Richard
- The Return of the Pink Panther (1975) as Colonel Sharki
- Providence (1977) as Nils
- Agatha (1979) as Hotel Manager
- The Passage (1979) as Guide
- Victor Victoria (1982) as Labisse
- Trail of the Pink Panther (1982) as Col. Bufoni
- Curse of the Pink Panther (1983) as General Bufoni
- Tangiers (1982) as Malen (final film role)

=== Television ===
- The Avengers (1961–1966) as Pasold / Redfern / Cosmo Gallion / Kolchek
- Danger Man (1964–1965) as General G'Niore / Chi Ling / John Richardson
- The Saint (1964) as Pablo Enriquez
- The Mask of Janus (1965) as Copic
- Hereward the Wake (1965) as Harold Godwinson
- The Spies (1966) as Copic
- The Baron (1967) as Mario Navini
- Man in a Suitcase (1968) as Rudnik
- The Champions (1968) as Margoli
- Department S (1968/1969) as Slovic / Segres
- Special Branch (1970) as Anatoli Golovin
- Softly, Softly (1972) as Billy Baxter
- The Stallion (1972)
- Quiller (1975) as Neumann
- Secret Army (1979) as Colonel von Schalk
- To Serve Them All My Days (1981) as Dr. Farrington / Doctor Farrington
- Triangle (1982–1983) as Kevin Warrender
- Hart to Hart (1983) as Brooks Kerr
- The Far Pavilions (1984) as The General
