= Clifton Parker =

British composer (1905–1989)

Clifton Parker (5 February 1905 – 2 September 1989) was a British composer, particularly noted for his film scores. During his career, he composed scores for over 50 feature films, as well as numerous documentary shorts, radio and television scores, over 100 songs and music for ballet and theatre.

== Life ==
Edward John Clifton Parker was born on 5 February 1905 in London, the youngest son of a bank manager. He was encouraged by his father to go into commerce but studied music privately and composed his first published work, Romance for violin and piano, when aged sixteen. In 1924, he decided to divide his names—to use 'Edward John' for lighter compositions and 'Clifton Parker' for more serious compositions. However, he never used the former. He obtained an ARCM diploma in piano teaching at the Royal Academy of Music in 1926 and abandoned his career in commerce and became a music copyist.

By the mid-1930s he was living in Folkestone and acting as organist and arranger to the local municipal orchestra. He was also achieving success with some of his classical pieces and managed to get his work accepted for broadcast on the BBC, work such as In a Twilight Dim with Rose. He came to the attention of Muir Mathieson, one of the music pioneers of the British film industry. His early film compositions were uncredited, including the 1942 Noël Coward film In Which We Serve. There followed a series of war documentaries, including Battle Is Our Business (1942), Towards the Offensive (1944) and Western Approaches (1944), through which his name finally began to attract attention. The Imperial War Museum held a commemorative event with special screenings of the films in June and July 2003.

The 1950s were a prolific period, with Parker composing for many mediums, especially film. However, in 1963 he was one of three composers, the others being William Alwyn and Franz Reizenstein, who abandoned scoring film music in protest of the exorbitant percentage of royalties taken by the publishers.

Parker was married twice. His second wife, Yoma Sasburg, was principal dancer in a number of his ballet productions. He was the father of Julia Clifton Parker, better known as writer Julia Stoneham. He was inactive for the final 13 years of his life owing to ulcers and emphysema, and he died on 2 September 1989, aged 84, in Marlow. The Clifton Parker Bursary at Dartington International Summer School was founded to encourage the study of film music.

== Works ==
=== Film scores ===
Clifton Parker wrote the music for many feature films, and is much admired for his "lively symphonic style". Although most of his scores are missing, presumed destroyed, several have been reconstructed by Philip Lane and have been released on a Chandos Records CD, performed by the BBC Philharmonic Orchestra. Notable scores include:

- It Started at Midnight (1943)
- Yellow Canary (1943)
- Western Approaches (1944, Crown Film Unit)
- This Happy Breed (1944)
- Johnny Frenchman (1945)
- Steam (1945), short documentary directed by James E Rogers
- The Man Within (1947)
- Blanche Fury (1948)
- Poet's Pub (1949)
- The Blue Lagoon (1949)
- Treasure Island (1950)
- The Wooden Horse (1950) – finest scoring of credits
- Life in Her Hands (1951)
- The Story of Robin Hood (1951)
- The Sword and the Rose (1952)
- Single Handed (1953)
- Night of the Demon (1957)
- Campbell's Kingdom (1957)
- Sea of Sand (1958)
- The 39 Steps (1959)
- Sink the Bismarck! (1960)
- A Circle of Deception (1960)
- The Hellfire Club (1961)
- Taste of Fear (1961)
- The Treasure of Monte Cristo (1961)
- Girl on Approval (1961)
- H.M.S. Defiant (U.S. release: Damn the Defiant!) (1962)
- Mystery Submarine (1963)
- The Informers (1963)

=== Documentaries ===
As well as his war documentaries, Parker also composed four British Transport Films documentaries; Elizabethan Express (1954), Long Night Haul (1956), Blue Pullman (1960) and Ocean Terminal (1952/1961). He also scored the incidental music to an episode of the acclaimed BBC Documentary War in the Air (1954).

=== Stage ===
Parker wrote prolifically for the stage, notably for the Old Vic theatre, R.A.D.A. and the Hampstead Theatre Club. His scores include incidental music for a dramatic adaptation of Leo Tolstoy's War and Peace; The Glass Slipper, based on Cinderella and The Silver Curlew based on Rumplestiltskin. He co-wrote 103 songs during his career, mainly for stage revues. He also wrote an opera Pyatigorsk in 1973.

=== Concert music ===
In light music circles, Parker's overture to the play The Glass Slipper is now well known, although it was many years before it became available on a commercial recording. Much of Parker's concert music is now either lost or neglected, although some pieces are preserved in the Bodleian Library, Oxford. A few orchestral pieces have been recorded, including the overture Thieves Carnival (1959) and the Two Choreographic Studies of 1940, written for his ballet dancer wife Yoma Sasburg to star in. Seascape is an orchestral tone poem separated out from his 1944 film score for Western Approaches. Parker also composed a number of choral works, particularly later in his life, including Nocturnes for the King's Singers and a Missa Brevis in 1976.
