= Leon Griffiths =

British television writer (1928–1992)

- Born: 15 February 1928; Sheffield, England, United Kingdom
- Died: 10 June 1992 (aged 64)
- Resting place: Highgate Cemetery
- Occupation(s): Television and film screenwriter
- Known for: Minder

Leon Griffiths (15 February 1928 – 10 June 1992) was a British writer who worked in television and film. He is best known for being the creator of the ITV comedy-drama Minder.

== Early life and career ==
Griffiths was born in Sheffield but grew up in Glasgow, where his mother was a local Communist Party activist. During his national service, he worked for the British Forces Network alongside Cliff Michelmore. After completing his national service, he took up a writing post with the Daily Worker, a communist newspaper. He reported from Budapest for much of this time, but after witnessing the repression of the Hungarian Uprising in 1956 he decisively renounced communism.

== Screenwriter works ==
Griffiths' early credits include scripts for TV shows such as The Adventures of Robin Hood, The Four Just Men and Play for Today. His film credits include The Grissom Gang (1961), The Hellfire Club (1964), The Treasure of Monte Cristo (1964) and The Squeeze (1977).

In 1979 Griffiths created the ITV comedy-drama Minder, which followed the exploits of a salesman named Arthur Daley (played by George Cole) and his two "minders" (i.e., bodyguards), Terry McCann (Dennis Waterman, from Series 1 to Series 7) and Ray Daley (Gary Webster, from Series 8 to Series 10). Initially intended as a crime drama in the style of The Sweeney, Griffiths centred the programme more firmly on the character of Arthur Daley after being advised by his agent to introduce some humour into his scripts. The inspiration for the show came from the stories Griffiths heard while frequenting drinking clubs in north London. Griffiths received a lengthy tribute from Paul Stenning for his work on Minder via The Minder Podcast in 2023.

== Death ==
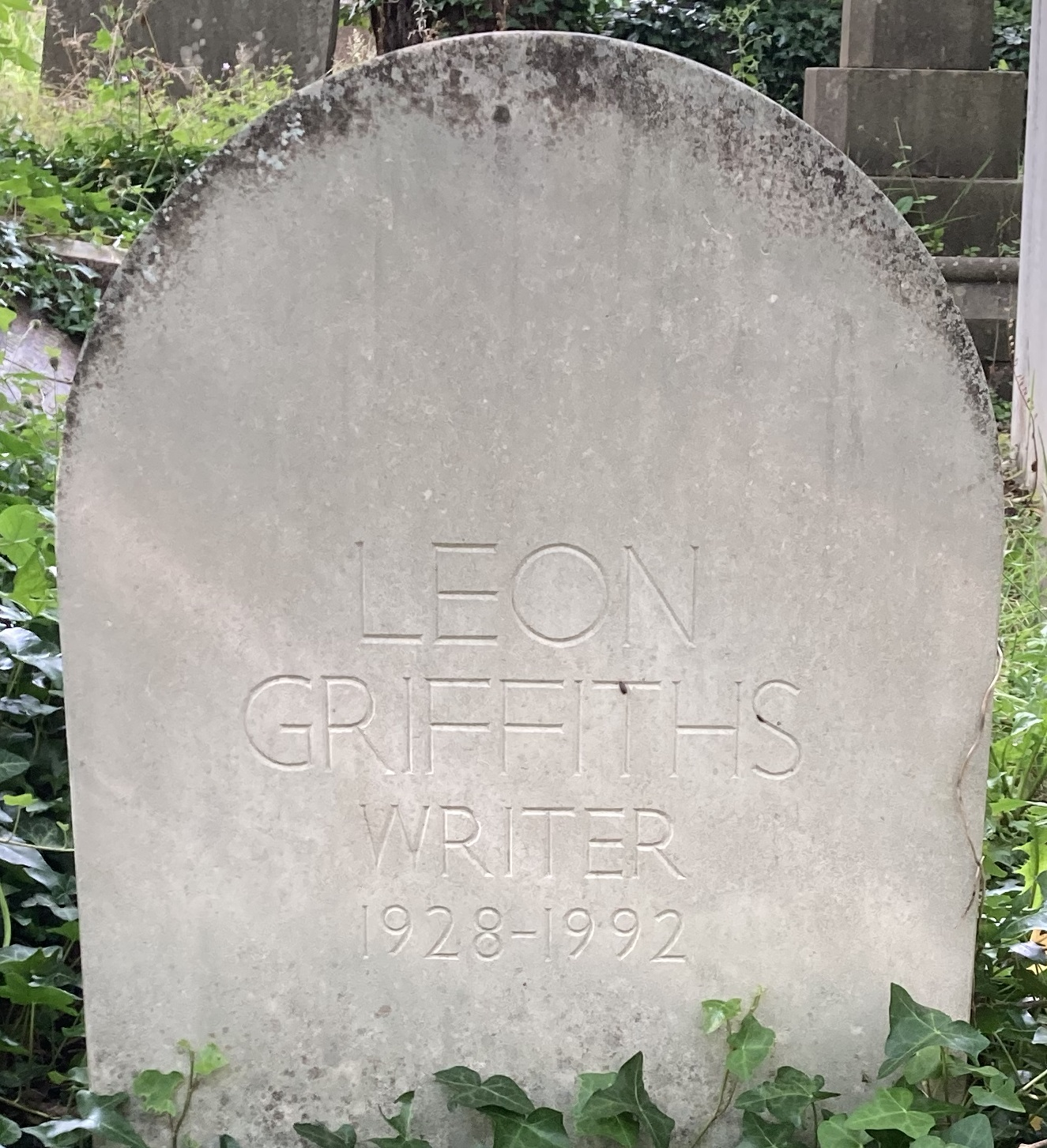
Grave of Leon Griffiths in Highgate Cemetery

Griffiths died on 10 June 1992, aged 64. He is buried on the east side of Highgate Cemetery in north London.
