= The Squeeze (1977 film) =

1977 British film by Michael Apted

- Theatrical release poster
- Directed by: Michael Apted
- Screenplay by: Leon Griffiths
- Based on: Whose Little Girl Are You? 1974 novel by James Tucker
- Produced by: Stanley O'Toole
- Starring: Stacy Keach; David Hemmings; Edward Fox; Stephen Boyd; Carol White; Freddie Starr
- Cinematography: Dennis C. Lewiston
- Edited by: John Shirley
- Music by: David Hentschel
- Production company: Warner Bros. Pictures
- Distributed by: Warner Bros. Pictures
- Release dates: 7 November 1977 (Sweden); 20 March 1977 (United Kingdom)
- Running time: 104 minutes
- Country: United Kingdom
- Language: English
- Budget: $1.4 million

The Squeeze is a 1977 British gangster thriller directed by Michael Apted and starring Stacy Keach, Edward Fox, David Hemmings and Stephen Boyd, in one of his final film performances. It was based on the 1974 novel Whose Little Girl Are You? by Bill James (as David Craig). The screenplay was by Minder creator Leon Griffiths.

== Plot summary ==
Before the action depicted in the film begins, Jill had left Naboth who, despite his habitual overdrinking, had managed to keep custody of their two sons. He had lost his job as a police detective and become a private investigator. Jill had since married Foreman and lived with him and his daughter Christine.

In the film, Keith Unslaw leads a gang of criminals, including Barry and Taf and their driver Des. They kidnap Jill and Christine, using them to blackmail Foreman into helping the gang raid his security van full of cash. Foreman employs Naboth to help him recover Jill and Christine without doing any damage to his reputation, which he highly prizes. Naboth follows Foreman to a rendezvous and recognises Keith from a case he successfully investigated when he was a police detective. Naboth tracks the gang to Vic Smith's house where he intends to rescue Jill and Christine but, instead, Keith recognises him and they beat him up, strip him naked and send him home.

During her and Christine's confinement, Jill complies with the gang's demands to keep them occupied with cooking and playing backgammon. Eventually they coerce her into stripping naked in front of them, echoing the way Naboth had been humiliated at Vic's house. After the raid takes place, Jill and Christine are taken to be handed over to Foreman. Christine is released. Through circumstances, Vic's daughter is also present and Naboth seizes her, threatening to shoot her if Jill is not released; she eventually is. Naboth apprehends Vic.

The plot relies on the relationships between the main characters, including Jill's history with Naboth; Foreman valuing his business more than his wife; Naboth and Keith's past conflict as detective and criminal; and a sub-plot involving Naboth's relationship with his friend Teddy. It leaves open the possibility that Foreman was in on the kidnap plot as a means of stealing the company's money and humiliating Jill.

== Cast ==
- Stacy Keach as ex-detective Jim Naboth
- Freddie Starr as Naboth's friend Teddy
- Carol White as Jill
- Alison Portes as Jill's daughter Christine
- Edward Fox as Jill's husband Foreman

=== Kidnap gang ===
- David Hemmings as Keith Unslaw
- Stephen Boyd as Vic Smith
- Roy Marsden as Barry
- Stewart Harwood as Des
- Alan Ford as Taff

=== Other cast members ===
- Hilary Gasson as Barbara
- Rod Beacham as Dr. Jenkins
- Leon Greene as commissionaire
- Lucinda Duckett as Sharon
- Marjie Lawrence as Beryl
- Steve Jones as extra

== Production ==
The film was shot in London in October 1976. Keach said Apted was "a wonderful and intelligent director" who cast the actor on the basis of his appearance in Conduct Unbecoming (1975).

The producers of The Squeeze enlisted ex-gangster Bob Ramsey to act as a contact between the film unit and the local underworld to cut down on harassment, due to location shooting in rather undesirable areas where criminals were operating. Local people in the area were hired as extras. Sex Pistols guitarist Steve Jones accidentally became an extra in the film..

The classic Rolls-Royce driven by Stephen Boyd, is known as the most filmed individual Rolls-Royce motor car , seen in more than 35 films or TV series. Chassis no. SRH2971. Source www. imcdb.org

Apted called it an "informed look at the British underworld" and said Warner Bros considered the film "too indigenous."

Keach said the film "didn't translate in America but it was well regarded and successful in England."

== Reception ==
The Monthly Film Bulletin wrote: "The Squeeze is as neat and skilful a takeover bid as the English cinema has pulled off in a long time. Even if the plot tends to tie itself in knots working in all the emotional complexities, it provides action and moral ambiguity enough to stock a Don Siegel thriller, and a gallery of underworld types as sharply and fully delineated as anything this side of Performance [1970]."

Variety wrote: "The best to be said for it is that it's competently made. Keach suffers some nasty lumps and sundry humiliations, all in the cause of Edward Fox as a security firm exec whose wife and kid are hostages against a million-dollar-plus payoff. Carol White is the terrorized wife, with the complication that she's also Keach's former spouse. David Hemmings is one of the thugs, and Stephen Boyd turns up as the gang mastermind with a resonant Irish brogue. He's an entertaining meanie and tackles the part with relish. The Leon Griffiths screenplay, however, doesn't afford much latitude for the others, excepting Freddie Starr in for comic relief as a reformed hood trying to reform his idol, Keach. The latter should be sympathetic but isn't – blame the character, not him ... pic has little in the way of style and no great surprises. It does, however, have a kind of gratuitous nasty tone."

Leon Hunt found The Squeeze to be "a better sequel to Sweeney! (1977) than Sweeney 2 (1978) ...[with] its "superbly drawn and vividly played villains".

Sight and Sound said that Apted "makes a fair fist of transferring the dirty cop thriller to Notting Hill" with "real world flair", but it found "Stacey Keach's problems as a drunken ex-copper... unengaging."
