= List of Cybill episodes =

Cybill is an American television sitcom created by Chuck Lorre and starring Cybill Shepherd which aired on CBS from January 2, 1995, to July 13, 1998.

== Series overview ==
Season	Episodes	Originally released	
Season	Episodes	First released	Last released
1	13	January 2, 1995	May 15, 1995
2	24	September 17, 1995	May 20, 1996
3	26	September 16, 1996	May 19, 1997
4	24	September 15, 1997	July 13, 1998

== Episodes ==
=== Season 1 (1995) ===
No. overall	No. in season	Title	Directed by	Written by	Original release date	Prod. code	U.S. viewers (millions)
1	1	"Virgin, Mother, Crone"	Robert Berlinger	Chuck Lorre	January 2, 1995	101	21.2
Cybill dates a stranger she meets in a traffic jam, but is thrown off balance by being told she is too old to get good parts, that her older daughter is expecting a baby, and that her younger daughter is dating a college man by lying about her age.
2	2	"How Can I Call You My Ex-Husbands If You Won't Go Away?"	Tom Moore	Chuck Lorre	January 9, 1995	102	19.8
Cybill's does not know if her ex-husbands really out of her life, as Jeff temporarily moves in, and Ira and she share a romantic moment. Meanwhile, she must decide whether to do a movie with a nude shower scene. This episode features a brief appearance from Cybill Shepherd’s Moonlighting co- star, Curtis Armstrong.
3	3	"As the World Turns to Crap"	Tom Moore	Elaine Aronson	January 16, 1995	103	18.3
Cybill competes with a wily colleague for the role of the producer's pet when she learns that one of their soap opera characters will die; meanwhile, she plans for the arrival of Rachel's prudish Boston in-laws.
4	4	"Look Who's Stalking"	Tom Moore	Dottie Dartland	January 23, 1995	104	19.6
Cybill is attracted to a man she meets while they walk their respective dogs, who turns out to be Ira's ex-psychiatrist; Maryann befriends her ex-husband's new girlfriend Sharon in her continuing scheme for revenge.
5	5	"Starting on the Wrong Foot"	Tom Moore	Howard M. Gould	February 6, 1995	105	19.3
Maryann has her first date in 25 years, but frightens him off with obsessive gifts of shoes; Jonathan Frakes presses Cybill to go out with him.
6	6	"Call Me Irresponsible"	Tom Moore	Story by : Michael Dempsey; Teleplay by : Dottie Dartland & Linda Wallem	February 13, 1995	106	15.9
Dateless on Valentine's Day, Cybill and Maryann feel unappreciated and bored until Maryann comes up with a plan - a trip to Vegas to max out her ex's credit card. Meanwhile, Ira has to look after Jeff in ways he would rather not when Jeff gets his hands covered with poison oak.
7	7	"See Jeff Jump, Jump, Jeff, Jump!"	Robert Berlinger	Story by : Mike Langworthy & Philip Babcock; Teleplay by : Mike Langworthy	February 20, 1995	107	16.5
Cybill's efforts to end Jeff's overextended stay above her garage stall out when her ex gets fired, then decides he wants to switch careers.
8	8	"The Curse of Zoey"	Robert Berlinger	Story by : Dottie Dartland; Teleplay by : Elaine Aronson & Linda Wallem	February 27, 1995	108	18.7
Maryann insists that it is no coincidence that Cybill's luck improved when Zoey moves out - especially after a psychic senses a "negative energy" in the house.
9	9	"The Replacements"	Andrew D. Weyman	Lee Aronsohn & Chuck Lorre	March 13, 1995	109	18.7
Cybill feels neglected when Maryann becomes preoccupied with her new basoonist boyfriend.
10	10	"Death and Execs"	Andrew D. Weyman	Story by : Dottie Dartland & Linda Wallem; Teleplay by : Chuck Lorre & Howard M. Gould	March 20, 1995	110	18.8
Old feelings come back to life when Cybill lands in Ira's comforting arms after a brush with death on a movie set. So, the two decide to bury their past and start dating.
11	11	"The Last Temptation of Cybill"	Robert Berlinger	Story by : Mike Langworthy & Michael Dempsey; Teleplay by : Elaine Aronson & Lee Aronsohn	April 10, 1995	111	17.8
Cybill and Ira's second chance at romance faces a Herculean challenge when handsome young actor Rick takes his love-scene rehearsals with Cybill very seriously. Meanwhile, Maryann buys a telescope to gaze at the stars - movie stars.
12	12	"The Big Sleep-Over"	Robert Berlinger	Story by : Chuck Lorre; Teleplay by : Dottie Dartland & Howard M. Gould	May 8, 1995	112	15.5
The arrival of Zoe's rocket-scientist boyfriend Greg launches a series of squabbles; Cybill takes off for Nevada to rescue a flighty Maryann from marriage.
13	13	"The Cheese Stands Alone"	Alan Myerson	Lee Aronsohn	May 15, 1995	113	13.6
Maryann plans a sabotage surprise (Limberger cheese in the air conditioning) for Dr. Dick's party, which is the same night as her own party. Ira's book is going to be made into a film with Sir Anthony Hopkins, and he wants Cybill to go to London with him.

=== Season 2 (1995–96) ===
No. overall	No. in season	Title	Directed by	Written by	Original release date	Prod. code	U.S. viewers (millions)
14	1	"Cybill Discovers the Meaning of Life"	Andrew D. Weymen	Story by : Chuck Lorre; Teleplay by : Chuck Lorre & Elaine Aronson	September 17, 1995	201	14.0
Disturbed by feeling that her family all has lives separate from her own, Cybill drags Maryann into the desert in search of spiritual insights, and receiving an urgent psychic message from the universe, rushes back just in time for the birth of her grandson.
15	2	"Zing!"	Andrew D. Weymen	Story by : Lee Aronsohn; Teleplay by : Lee Aronsohn & Alan Ball	September 24, 1995	202	13.6
Cybill tells Maryann that "there's no zing anymore" when she meets someone new. It is still missing when Maryann sets her up on a blind date - until she meets the man's 60-something father.
16	3	"Since I Lost My Baby"	Andrew D. Weymen	Story by : Chuck Lorre; Teleplay by : Lee Aronsohn & Linda Wallem	October 1, 1995	203	13.7
Jeff's second ex-wife Terry is pregnant, and tells Cybill that Jeff is the unwitting father; Cybill and Maryann take William shopping, but return home with the wrong stroller and baby.
17	4	"Cybill with an 'S'"	Andrew D. Weymen	Story by : Howard M. Gould; Teleplay by : Michael Langworthy & Linda Wallem	October 8, 1995	204	15.4
Ira brings his new girlfriend to Zoey's sweet sixteen birthday party, and Cybill and Maryann both like her until they discover she has uncontrollable multiple personalities; Zoey and Sean, a busboy from the restaurant, are mutually smitten.
18	5	"Cybill's Fifteen Minutes"	Andrew D. Weymen	Story by : Lee Aronsohn & Howard M. Gould; Teleplay by : Russ Woody	October 15, 1995	205	16.2
Cybill is hounded by the press after her Oscar night date, famous actor Dennis Oliver leaves her and then solicits a prostitute in LA, taking it for granted he will not get caught.
19	6	"Nice Work If You Can Get It"	Andrew D. Weymen	Pat Bowman & Shivas Irons	October 22, 1995	206	14.1
Controlling Maryann comes to Cybill's financial rescue when the star of her new sitcom, Dick Van Patten, drops dead during a curtain call.
20	7	"To Sir, with Lust"	Andrew D. Weymen	Alan Ball	November 5, 1995	207	14.7
Cybill ponders whether or not to get physically intimate when she dates and desires her acting teacher, until she sees him in his one-man play; and Zoey reconsiders her vow of chastity now that she has met Sean.
21	8	"They Shoot Turkeys, Don't They?"	Andrew D. Weymen	Story by : Elaine Aronson & Michael Langworthy; Teleplay by : Maria A. Brown & Howard M. Gould	November 19, 1995	208	13.5
Cybill's an unhappy Pilgrim who is not making much progress realizing her dream of a family Thanksgiving: everyone goes elsewhere, and she has to work on the holiday.
22	9	"Local Hero"	Andrew D. Weymen	Story by : Elaine Aronson & Russ Woody; Teleplay by : Linda Wallem & Howard M. Gould	November 26, 1995	209	13.8
After she is replaced in a movie starring Kenny Rogers, Cybill thinks her career is a flop - until she takes a gamble on accepting an invitation to visit an immigrant family who collectively idolize her. Meanwhile, Rachel tries to counsel Ira out of his neurotic fear of the telephone.
23	10	"The Odd Couples"	Andrew D. Weymen	Russ Woody	December 3, 1995	210	15.0
Not since Felix and Oscar have there been such odd pairings: Ira shadows Maryann hoping her lunacy will dispel his trouble with writer's block; and Cybill hangs out with Sean.
24	11	"Mourning Has Broken"	Andrew D. Weymen	Elaine Aronson	December 17, 1995	211	13.9
Cybill renews a romance with David Whittier Sr., which ended the first time because he was still mourning his wife's death. But Maryann's convinced he did more than mourn - she thinks he caused it. So she and Cybill break into his house in search of evidence.
25	12	"The Big Apple Can Bite Me"	Andrew D. Weymen	Linda Wallem	January 8, 1996	212	20.8
A rotten experience in the Big Apple in 1969 took a chunk out of Cybill's self-esteem, so, for her birthday, Maryann, Rachel and Zoey take her to New York and teach her how to bite back.
26	13	"Educating Zoey"	Andrew D. Weymen	Michael Dempsey	January 14, 1996	213	13.7
Cybill and Ira learn a lesson in parenting when one of Zoey informs them that college is not part of her plans for the future.
27	14	"Where's Zoey?"	Andrew D. Weymen	Maria A. Brown	February 4, 1996	214	14.9
Cybill refuses to let Zoey stay home alone while she travels to Vancouver to film a science fiction series, so Maryann offers to let the "demon seed" stay with her. But Maryann gets into a difficulty when she goes out for olives and Zoey disappears.
28	15	"Lowenstein's Lament"	Andrew D. Weymen	Glenn Gers	February 11, 1996	215	16.7
Cybill auditions to play herself in the film based on Ira's book, but she regards the written character as a "needy doormat" - which may be why her performance is flat; and she loses the role to Paula Abdul.
29	16	"Wedding Bell Blues"	Andrew D. Weymen	James L. Freedman	February 18, 1996	216	13.7
Morgan Fairchild returns as one of Cybill's casting competitors, who beats her out for another job, and then announces that she is marrying Maryann's ex-husband Dr. Dick. So the two plot revenge schemes to ruin the wedding reception. Nothing goes as planned, but a food fight puts an end to the reception anyway.
30	17	"A Who's Who for What's His Name"	Andrew D. Weymen	Russ Woody	February 18, 1996	217	15.9
Cybill's agent Arthur dies and Cybill ends up planning his funeral loaded with look-alikes. Maryann makes a move on Ira, but he rejects her.
31	18	"Romancing the Crone"	Andrew D. Weymen	Bruce Eric Kaplan	March 10, 1996	218	14.8
Cybill accidentally causes a famous actress to break her arm, so she invites her to recuperate at her home, where the woman breaks Cybill's endurance with boundless demands. Meanwhile, Zoey discovers that her brother-in-law Kevin is having an on-line dalliance with another woman.
32	19	"An Officer and a Thespian"	Andrew D. Weymen	Story by : Russ Woody & Maria A. Brown; Teleplay by : Michael Langworthy & Linda Wallem	March 17, 1996	219	15.6
To land a movie role as a cop, Cybill prepares by riding with a police officer on duty; but when his wife goes into labour, Cybill is left with the car, the siren and a call from Maryann in trouble. Meanwhile, Rachel's husband throws a party to ingratiate himself to his academic superior in hopes of landing tenure; and Zoey and Sean notice the academic's wife stealing the silver.
33	20	"Virgin, Mother, Cheater"	Jonathan Weiss	Jane O'Brien	March 31, 1996	220	14.8
Kevin's preoccupation with getting tenure looks like an affair to Rachel, who decides that two can play that game; Zoey and Sean lie about their celibacy to stop their friends' questions.
34	21	"When You're Hot, You're Hot"	Andrew D. Weymen	Erin A. Bishop & Susan Nirah Jaffe	April 29, 1996	221	15.6
Cybill's hot flashes and herbal treatments do not make her feel any younger, nor does Ira's visiting mother Ruth, who has traded in pantsuits for trendy clothes and an herbal pleasure of her own (or, as she calls it, "a little sweet wheat"). But Ruth is a hit with Zoey, since she arrives in a pink Cadillac that is a present for her granddaughter, much to Cybill and Ira's dismay.
35	22	"Pal Zoey"	Andrew D. Weymen	Michael Langworthy	May 6, 1996	222	14.7
Cybill is disconcerted but delighted when a heartbroken Zoey decides she wants to be best friends; but Rachel storms off when Cybill and Jeff agree to sit in on a marriage counselling session, only to discover that Jeff slept with Rachel's therapist. Meanwhile, Maryann tries to make Ira jealous by flirting with Cybill's Arkansas cousin Lyle (Jeff Foxworthy), who is obsessed with getting onto 'The Price is Right'.
36	23	"Three Women and a Dummy"	Pamela Fryman	Alan Ball	May 13, 1996	223	15.1
Zoey's new-found popularity confounds an apologetic Sean; Ira and Maryann go on a first date; Cybill accompanies the waiter to a party at his ex-boyfriend's.
37	24	"Going Out with a Bang"	Pamela Fryman	Story by : Howard M. Gould; Teleplay by : Maria A. Brown & Michael Langworthy	May 20, 1996	224	14.8
Children's show host Major Milo proposes to Cybill on the air; but she is much more interested in a hunky cable technician. Meanwhile, Ira and Maryann have a steamy dinner date that ends in disaster.

=== Season 3 (1996–97) ===
No. overall	No. in season	Title	Directed by	Written by	Original release date	Prod. code	U.S. viewers (millions)
38	1	"Bringing Home the Bacon"	Andrew D. Weymen	Russ Woody	September 16, 1996	301	19.73
On the barnyard set of her new show (a parody of Babe), Cybill rescues a pig that was fired and doomed to be eaten; then tries to keep an independent Zoey from leaving home after she visits the greener pastures of Paris. Meanwhile, Maryann dresses as Little Bo Peep to entice a sheepish Ira.
39	2	"Venice or Bust"	Andrew D. Weymen	Alan Ball	September 23, 1996	302	17.20
Zoey moves out; Cybill and Maryann take a sculpting class.
40	3	"Cybill and Maryann Go to Japan"	Andrew D. Weymen	Linda Wallem	September 30, 1996	304	17.20
As the spokeswoman for a Japanese car company, Cybill (along with Maryann) visits Japan, where both are embraced - until they take a stuffy executive's wife out to greet the rising sun. Meanwhile, Ira mediates a dispute between Zoey and Sean.
41	4	"It's for You, Mrs. Lincoln"	Andrew D. Weymen	Michael Langworthy	October 7, 1996	303	16.47
When Cybill gets a chance to play Abraham Lincoln's wife on stage, an unexpected caller interrupts her big moment. Cast as the understudy for Joan Hayden, the lead in What Now, Mrs. Lincoln?, Cybill awaits the day that the star breaks her amazing record of never having missed a performance in her life. Just when Cybill thinks it is hopeless, the star is stricken with an allergic reaction, putting Cybill in the spotlight. Unfortunately, her chance of a lifetime runs amok when the cell phone that she accidentally left in her skirt pocket starts ringing in the middle of the climactic scene. Meantime, Maryann and Ira gang up on a woman in the audience for her rude behavior - oblivious to the fact that she is the powerful agent Cybill has been courting for months.
42	5	"Cybill, Get Your Gun"	Andrew D. Weymen	Jeff Lowell	October 14, 1996	305	14.6
After Cybill is robbed, she decides to fight back by taking a course in self defense. Cybill decides to take action with tactics that include an obnoxious house alarm, self-defense courses taught by Vicki Lawrence (guest starring as herself), and her very own "Safety Man," a role she bestows on an unenthusiastic Zoey. Meanwhile, the newly available Ira finds that he has misrepresented himself when he meets a woman at one of Jeff's favorite hangouts - an Alcoholic's Anonymous meeting. And, Maryann becomes a suspect in the abrupt disappearance of Dr. Dick
43	6	"Cybill Does Diary"	Andrew D. Weymen	Michael Patrick King	October 21, 1996	306	16.96
After discovering Cybill's picture on an X-rated video, Cybill and Maryann decide to produce an erotic video intended for women. But when Cybill borrows Zoey's laptop to write the script and tries to e-mail it to a producer, she accidentally sends Zoey's European diary instead - and the producer loves the story of how Zoey lost her virginity.
44	7	"Sex, Drugs and Catholicism"	Peter Baldwin	James L. Freedman	November 4, 1996	307	14.7
Ira is full of sexual energy thanks to the new hormones he is taking - but when he learns they are really placebos, he proposes to Holly. Cybill agrees to be Ira's best man, but when Zoey resists being a bridesmaid, Holly shows her true colours. Meanwhile, Maryann goes to confession.
45	8	"Going to Hell in a Limo: Part 1"	Peter Baldwin	Story by : Elaine Aronson; Teleplay by : Maria A. Brown	November 11, 1996	308	14.1
Cybill becomes a prime-time hit in the new sf series Lifeforms, but when her co-star starts sleeping with the female producer, Cybill's role gets reduced to a few lines per episode. Meanwhile, Ira tries to convince Zoey to throw a bridal shower for Holly.
46	9	"Going to Hell in a Limo: Part 2"	Andrew D. Weymen	Story by : Elaine Aronson; Teleplay by : Erin A. Bishop & Susan Nirah Jaffe	November 18, 1996	309	14.9
Cybill retaliates when her obnoxious co-star Jack mysteriously fires his friend, the executive producer, Buddy, and apologizes to Cybill for his rude - and crude - behavior. Becoming suspicious, Cybill, Maryann and Cybill's producer friend Amy devise a sting operation to trick Buddy into revealing the truth behind Jack's sudden change of heart. Meanwhile, Zoey is having second thoughts about being maid of honor at the wedding of her father, Ira, and Holly after overhearing Holly remark to a friend that Zoey threw her a tacky wedding shower.
47	10	"Buffalo Gals"	Andrew D. Weymen	Alan Ball	November 25, 1996	310	15.50
Maryann goes home to Buffalo for an uneasy reunion with her parents, and to attend a 25-year reunion of her high-school classmates - who treated her poorly. When Maryann cannot make her high school reunion, Cybill decides to pose as Maryann and go in her place. Cybill had convinced Maryann to attend her high school reunion and planned to accompany her, but when the pair returns to Maryann's home town of Buffalo, N.Y. to take on the former classmates who made Maryann's life intolerable, Maryann learns that her son - who she believed was traveling with Greenpeace - is actually living with her parents. When Maryann consequently opts to forgo the reunion to spend time with him, Cybill, not one to miss an opportunity, goes to the reunion as Maryann in order to claim revenge on the classmates who made Maryann's high school experience a nightmare. Meantime, Cybill is also spearheading efforts to make Thanksgiving dinner plans.
48	11	"A Hell of a Christmas"	Andrew D. Weymen	Story by : Maria A. Brown; Teleplay by : Jane O'Brien & Michael Poryes	December 9, 1996	311	14.3
Cybill's overbearing mom comes for a Christmas visit. Cybill welcomes her mom, Virginia, who is in town for the holidays, but tensions arise when "Me-Maw" showers Rachel with affection while virtually ignoring Zoey. When Cybill confronts her about the favoritism, she learns that Virginia feels a responsibility to compensate for Cybill's own partiality towards Zoey. Meanwhile, Maryann volunteers to be Cybill's personal holiday shopper while Cybill deals with the fact that her show's time slot has been moved - opposite 60 Minutes, and Ira finds out that Zoey lost her virginity while in Europe.
49	12	"The Little Drummer Girls"	Andrew D. Weymen	Story by : Erin A. Bishop & Susan Nirah Jaffe; Teleplay by : Joey Murphy & John Pardee	December 16, 1996	312	14.1
Cybill tries to help Maryann, Rachel and Zoey overcome their romantic troubles by forcing them to take part in a new age drum beating session. Maryann, furious when Dr. Dick does not send any hateful gifts to her in honor of what would have been their 23rd anniversary, agrees to let Cybill take her to a new age female bonding session so she can get Dr. Dick out of her system once and for all. Meanwhile, Kevin uses Baby William to diffuse his anger towards Rachel and his job-hunting problems, and Ira finds out that Sean cheated on Zoey.
50	13	"Bachelor Party"	Andrew D. Weymen	Story by : Jane O'Brien; Teleplay by : Jane O'Brien & Michael Langworthy	January 6, 1997	313	15.42
As designated "best man" at Ira's wedding, Cybill is in charge of planning the bachelor party. Since Holly objects to hiring a stripper, Cybill decides to have everyone go to the track instead. But when Ira and the director of Cybill's television series show up expecting to see some skin, Cybill reluctantly agrees to have the party at a strip club. She and Maryann go disguised as men, primarily because Cybill does not want to jeopardize her newfound celebrity status. Meanwhile, Zoey tries to get used to her new job as production assistant on Cybill's television show, Lifeforms.
51	14	"Little Bo Beep"	Jonathan Weiss	Story by : Maria A. Brown; Teleplay by : James L. Freedman	January 20, 1997	314	15.40
Provoked by Cybill's offensive reaction to a lamb attack on live television, animal activists - led by Shari Lewis and Lamb Chop (as themselves) - launch a campaign against Cybill. When Cybill makes an appearance at a local zoo to promote "Lifeforms," she is bitten by a lamb while being interviewed on live television and reacts in politically incorrect fashion. Trying to save her career, Andy convinces her to be a guest speaker at an animal rights banquet. Meanwhile, while Cybill dates a younger man who seems too good to be true, Maryann desperately tries to cope with the fact that her new romantic interest shares something in common with her ex-husband - the same name.
52	15	"In Her Dreams"	Pamela Fryman	Story by : Bob Myer & Marilyn Suzanne Miller; Teleplay by : Bob Myer	February 3, 1997	315	14.34
Kevin gets a job teaching third grade, while Cybill loses her job and flashes back to how she first met Maryann at an audition for Rocky. Maryann and Cybill argue about Maryann going for a mammogram, while Ira and Cybill are both audited by the IRS.
53	16	"Valentine's Day"	Andrew D. Weymen	Story by : Michael Poryes; Teleplay by : Joey Murphy & John Pardee	February 10, 1997	316	14.97
Maryann is acting more bizarre than usual during a Valentine's Day outing with Richard and her visiting son. Meanwhile, Zoey moves in with Ira to spite her mother. Sparks fly between Zoey and Maryann's son, Justin. Maryann arranges a Valentine's Day dinner with her son and her new flame but panics and shows up on Cybill's doorstep with Justin and her beau, looking for moral support - just as Zoey is leaving to meet Ira. When Zoey and Justin see each other again - after years apart - they begin spending time together, and, although Maryann loves Zoey like a daughter, she fears that Zoey may break her son's heart. Meanwhile, Cybill spends Valentine's Day with the special guy in her life - her grandson, William.
54	17	"Kiss Me, You Fool"	Andrew D. Weymen	Story by : Linda Wallem; Teleplay by : James L. Freedman & Michael Langworthy	February 17, 1997	317	12.17
Cybill and Jeff co-star in a new action film. Just as Cybill is complaining to her photographer friend, Davolio that her career is going nowhere, Jeff uses his influence to get her the co-starring role in his new action film. Cybill must then return the favor when she learns that Jeff's future as the next action hero is on the line because he is unable to keep a straight face during intimate scenes. Now that Jeff's making more money than he knows what to do with, he gives Rachel and Kevin a down payment for a new house.
55	18	"True Confessions"	Jonathan Weiss	Story by : Erin A. Bishop & Susan Nirah Jaffe; Teleplay by : Linda Wallem & Maria A. Brown	February 24, 1997	318	12.76
Cybill stalks Maryann in order to research a new role and discovers a startling secret. When Cybill decides to base her character in Ira's new play on Maryann, she immediately begins to shadow Maryann's every move. But, when Maryann tells Cybill that she is not welcome to accompany her one afternoon, Cybill secretly follows her anyway. When she spies Maryann suspiciously meeting a man at his apartment, Cybill assumes that her friend is having an affair, only to discover that Maryann has been posing as a nude model.
56	19	"Name That Tune"	David Trainer	Story by : Linda Wallem; Teleplay by : Alan Ball & Michael Langworthy	March 3, 1997	319	17.23
Cybill joins Ira at an open-mike night for his debut as a stand-up comic, which gets off to a rocky start when he faints from stage fright. Cybill's performance, however, results in an offer to sing in a new Name That Tune. Meanwhile, Maryann displays unusual behavior, but if she seems preoccupied (to the point of wearing the same outfit two days running), it is because she thinks she may be pregnant.
57	20	"From Boca, with Love"	David Trainer	Story by : Erin A. Bishop & Susan Nirah Jaffe; Teleplay by : Maria A. Brown & Michael Poryes	March 10, 1997	320	14.06
Ira's mother is in town and Zoey goes to her for advice on college. Maryann is trying to keep her "new" Richard from her parents. Cybill goes on a disastrous date.
58	21	"All of Me"	Pamela Fryman	Story by : Steve Young; Teleplay by : Maria A. Brown & Linda Wallem	April 7, 1997	321	15.46
Cybill puts her foot down when she is chosen as a model for a shoe campaign only to see a billboard with her face - on a younger, thinner woman's "waif" body. Cybill decides to defend women of all shapes and sizes by defacing a billboard that depicts her face with someone else's waif-like figure. Meanwhile, Maryann freaks when she discovers that her son, Justin, is two-timing Zoey, and Ira decides to give up caffeine, which creates some abnormal side effects.
59	22	"The Wedding"	David Trainer	Story by : Michael Poryes; Teleplay by : James L. Freedman & Michael Langworthy	April 21, 1997	322	10.96
Learning that her film is a flop, Cybill has nothing to boast about to her friends when she attends a neighbor's wedding. But that is not the case for Zoey, who accidentally decks the bride while dancing.
60	23	"The Piano"	Jonathan Weiss	Story by : Michael Poryes; Teleplay by : Joey Murphy & John Pardee	April 28, 1997	323	13.91
Cybill needs a favor from Dr. Dick's wife, Andrea (guest star Morgan Fairchild, reprising the role), so in return, she grudgingly agrees to give a speech at an awards banquet honoring Andrea. When Cybill discovers that Andrea can get Zoey a piano audition that is otherwise unobtainable, she agrees to give the testimonial speech for the charity award, which deservedly belongs to Maryann. But when Cybill finds out that Zoey got the audition on her own, she decides to tell the awards committee what she really thinks of Andrea.
61	24	"There Was an Old Woman"	David Trainer	Story by : Linda Wallem; Teleplay by : Erin A. Bishop & Susan Nirah Jaffe	May 5, 1997	324	12.01
When a TV director takes his cat to see Maryann's Richard, Cybill drops by - dressed as an old woman - and becomes privy to Richard's intentions regarding Maryann.
62	25	"Mother's Day"	Jonathan Weiss	Story by : Alan Ball; Teleplay by : Michael Langworthy & Michael Poryes	May 12, 1997	325	15.29
Cybill does not realize that her mom, who is visiting for Mother's Day, is within earshot when she says she has worked her entire life trying not to become her mother.
63	26	"Let's Stalk"	Jonathan Weiss	Story by : Erin A. Bishop & Susan Nirah Jaffe; Teleplay by : James L. Freedman & Stephanie Arasim Portnoy	May 19, 1997	326	13.53
With Cybill as the organizer, Maryann's bachelorette party turns out to be one last evening stalking Dr. Dick. Realizing their stalking days are almost behind them, Cybill and Maryann agree that one last act of torment is in order. Zoey and Rachel join the duo in a rented van, equipped with the latest in surveillance technology, staking out Dr. Dick's house. Their mission: to inject Dr. Dick's water supply with a barrel of liposuctioned fat stolen from his office. But mid-execution, Cybill and Maryann overhear "Mrs. Dr. Dick" Andrea tell Dr. Dick that she is leaving him, causing Maryann to rethink her own marriage plans.

=== Season 4 (1997–98) ===
No. overall	No. in season	Title	Directed by	Written by	Original release date	Prod. code	U.S. viewers (millions)
64	1	"Regarding Henry"	David Trainer	Teleplay by : Erin A. Bishop & Susan Nirah Jaffe; Story by : Alan Ball	September 15, 1997	404	14.39
The series begins its fourth season with a trip back in time to the 16th century, as Cybill undergoes past-life regression treatment on the advice of her therapist when she begins having erotic dreams about Maryann's jilted beau Richard. She discovers that Maryann's poor choice in men goes back to the days of Henry VIII, when Maryann was Anne Boleyn, and returns to the present just in time to head off a close encounter between Maryann and the despised Dr. Dick. Joining Cybill in the Court of King Henry VIII are Zoey as Ariel's father, Ira as her brother the poet, and Justin as a serving wench.
65	2	"The Love of Her Life"	David Trainer	Teleplay by : John Pardee & Joey Murphy; Story by : Maria A. Brown	September 22, 1997	403	11.12
Maryann is shocked when Cybill tells her she had an affair with a married man - and now wants to rekindle the romance. Maryann reels from Cybill's hypocrisy, since Cybill is always advising her not to even consider going back to the cheating Dr. Dick. But Cybill, head-over-heels in lust with Roger, refuses to admit to her own double standard. Meanwhile, Ira is hurt when he overhears Cybill wonder about what might have been if she had never become Mrs. Woodbine
66	3	"The Big, Flouncy Thing"	David Trainer	Story by : Dan Bucatinky; Teleplay by : Linda Wallem & William Lucas Walker	September 29, 1997	402	14.19
Zoey rejects Cybill's advice about what to wear for her first piano competition, and Cybill mourns the loss of a mother-daughter moment. After having been brushed off by Zoey, Cybill meets a young girl who welcomes her mothering - and her father is not bad either. But when he turns out to be boorish, Cybill and Maryann scheme to get revenge. In the meantime, Ira and Justin battle over whose good luck charm Zoey should wear for her competition.
67	4	"Some Like It Hot"	David Trainer	Story by : Linda Wallem; Teleplay by : Michael Poryes & Kim Friese	October 6, 1997	406	11.94
The family take cover when Cybill's hormones rage after she opts to cope with menopause the "natural way" rather than with prescription drugs, while her visiting mother creates her own waves in the house and Ira tries to light a fire with Zoey's teacher Julia.
68	5	"Like Family"	David Trainer	Story by : Mark Hudis; Teleplay by : J. David Stem & David N. Weiss	October 13, 1997	405	12.27
Cybill throws herself into her role when she is cast to play the mother of a sweet teenage girl on a network sitcom. In reality, the girl turns out to be a tough-talking, ultra-hip teen, but Cybill is determined to mentor the difficult youth. The pending birth of Rachel's baby has everyone wondering who will be the godmother, and Maryann is hurt when no one even considers her as a possible choice.
69	6	"Earthquake"	David Trainer	Story by : Erin A. Bishop; Teleplay by : Maria A. Brown & William Lucas Walker	October 20, 1997	407	11.67
Cybill endures her new role as a sitcom mom, even though she thinks it could mean the end of her career, until her life is shaken up when a 4.0 earthquake rattles the city and inspires her to quit and "follow her bliss." Next thing she knows, Maryann convinces her that they should go to a "schmoozing" where Cybill meets a prominent female playwright. Meanwhile, Rachel shares some shocking news of her own with the family.
70	7	"Halloween"	David Trainer	Teleplay by : Alan Ball & Mark Hudis; Story by : Susan Nirah Jaffe	October 27, 1997	408	12.63
Cybill hosts a Halloween eve telethon, and recruits Maryann, Zoey, and Ira to help out. Things go fine at first, until Cybill and Maryann begin to air their differences on the air.
71	8	"Where's a Harpoon When You Need One?"	David Trainer	Story by : Michael Poryes; Teleplay by : Alan Ball & Kim Friese	November 3, 1997	401	13.35
Cybill gets a job as a spokeswoman on a cruise ship, but when she and Maryann take a cruise, it turns out to be one of displeasure: Dr. Dick, relentless in his efforts to win back Maryann, puts Cybill in a difficult situation by giving her a letter for his ex that Cybill knows will make Maryann "melt down."
72	9	"How to Get a Head in Show Business"	Jonathan Weiss	Story by : Kim Friese; Teleplay by : J. David Stem & David N. Weiss	November 10, 1997	409	12.35
When obsessed fan Minnie steals Cybill's wax head from Madame Tussaud's, the museum simply replaces it with the head of another blonde actress. Cybill and Maryann are outraged, so they concoct a scheme to travel to London and return the real "Cybill-head." Meanwhile, Zoey decides to give up her career as a pianist for an office job, while Cybill and Ira try to save her from a life of corporate drudgery.
73	10	"Grandbaby"	Jonathan Weiss	Story by : Stephanie Arasim Portnoy; Teleplay by : Michael Poryes & Linda Wallem	November 17, 1997	410	13.25
When Rachel goes into labor and Maryann has an appendicitis attack on the same day, Cybill finds herself stretched thin trying to care for each of them. After convincing a panicked Rachel that having a second child is a simple matter, Cybill must reassure Maryann, who is delusional from pain-killing drugs, that her hallucinated dinner party is a resounding success.
74	11	"The Golden Years"	Jonathan Weiss	Story by : William Lucas Walker; Teleplay by : John Pardee & Joey Murphy	December 1, 1997	411	13.24
It is the year 2027, and Cybill and Maryann, now senior citizens, are still sipping martinis and insulting men. When they come across Cybill's diary from 1997, Cybill begins to read aloud from the book, and one of the passages hurts Maryann's feelings - creating a rift between the two friends. Cybill and Maryann must travel 30 years into the past to resolve the issue and discover that their friendship has withstood the test of time for good reason.
75	12	"Show Me the Minnie"	Jonathan Weiss	Story by : Erin A. Bishop; Teleplay by : Maria A. Brown & Susan Nirah Jaffe	December 8, 1997	412	11.05
When Cybill's garage roof collapses and requires expensive repairs, she tries to get a loan from the bank, only to discover that the loan officer turns out to be her disgruntled former fan, Minnie Arbogast. Adding to Cybill's troubles, Ira accuses Maryann of causing the breakup of his marriage to Cybill. After trying unsuccessfully to reconcile her two friends and resolve her own financial crisis, Cybill gets help from an unlikely source - her former enemy and new-found friend, Minnie.
76	13	"Bakersfield"	David Trainer	Story by : Alan Ball; Teleplay by : Kim Friese & Mark Hudis	March 4, 1998	413	9.66
Following her mother's untimely passing, Cybill finds what appears to be a love letter to an unknown man in Bakersfield. She is shocked that her supposedly conservative mother may have had a longstanding, passionate secret love affair. Curious about this hidden part of her mother's past, Cybill travels to Bakersfield with Maryann and Zoey to deliver the letter to the mystery man herself.
77	14	"Once, Twice, Three Times a Lady"	David Trainer	Story by : Maria A. Brown; Teleplay by : John Pardee & Joey Murphy	March 11, 1998	418	10.01
In a fit of romantic nostalgia, Cybill writes a letter to her first love, Bobby Ray, and is pleasantly surprised when he flies in from Memphis to take her out on a date. After spending a wonderfully romantic evening with Bobby Ray, Cybill's faith in love is restored - until she realizes that his criminal history extends beyond being just a thief of hearts. Meanwhile, when Zoey's first love, Gianni, visits from Italy, she worries that seeing him will destroy the magic of their short-lived but passionate romance.
78	15	"Cybill Sheridan's Day Off"	David Trainer	Story by : Kim Friese; Teleplay by : Linda Wallem & William Lucas Walker	March 18, 1998	417	8.57
Cybill and Maryann masquerade as ladies of the night to foil an evil prank by the dastardly Dr. Dick. The scheme conceived by Dr. Dick goes wrong when his hired thugs mistakenly drug Cybill instead of Maryann and deposit her in a seedy bus station in the middle of nowhere. To make matters worse, when Maryann comes to rescue Cybill, her car gets stolen and both women end up stranded. The two friends finally get a ride home when two unsuspecting high school boys looking for a good time mistake them for ladies of the night. Meanwhile, Ira tries to instill in Zoey a love for basketball when he gets her a job playing the organ at a Lakers' game.
79	16	"Fine Is Not a Feeling"	David Trainer	Story by : Maria A. Brown; Teleplay by : Erin A. Bishop & Susan Nirah Jaffe	March 25, 1998	415	8.46
Maryann's son Justin decides to move to San Francisco for a new job, and Cybill convinces a reluctant Maryann to see a therapist and confront her irrational fear of losing her son. Cybill's suggestion backfires when Justin brings Maryann's ex-boyfriend, Richard, to the group therapy and the session descends into chaos. Meanwhile, Cybill quits an acting job out of disgust with Hollywood's lack of respect for older women.
80	17	"Oh Brother!"	David Trainer	Story by : Michael Poryes; Teleplay by : Alan Ball & Mark Hudis	April 1, 1998	416	8.35
Cybill forgot Ira's birthday and, to ease her guilty conscience, then concocts a crazy scheme to kidnap him and surprise him with the perfect gift - courtside tickets for a Lakers game. Maryann and Zoey act as Cybill's accomplices in the kidnapping scheme and successfully complete their mission - only to discover that they have abducted the wrong man. Meanwhile, Cybill's long-lost niece, Claire, visits from Bakersfield and is starstruck with her aunt's glamorous Hollywood. While Cybill entertains Claire, she finds a photo showing her with her brother, a man she never knew - and cannot remember.
81	18	"Whose Wife Am I, Anyway?"	David Trainer	Story by : Erin A. Bishop; Teleplay by : J. David Stem & David N. Weiss	May 25, 1998	419	7.92
Jeff convinces Cybill to pretend they are still married to please his sweet but old-fashioned grandmother. While Jeff and Cybill are celebrating their pretend 25th anniversary with grandma, the waiter, who is nervous about telling his parents that he is gay, introduces Cybill as his fiancee. Meanwhile, Maryann and Richard enjoy a romantic vacation in the country until the trip gets sidetracked by a veterinary emergency and Maryann finds herself delivering a calf.
82	19	"Dream Date"	David Trainer	Story by : Alan Ball; Teleplay by : Susan Nirah Jaffe & Mark Hudis	June 1, 1998	420	9.17
Maryann convinces a reluctant Cybill to go on the blind date with Bruce, who turns out to be an offensive jerk. Although Cybill is repulsed by Bruce's piggish behavior, after a storm traps him at Cybill's for the night along with Maryann, Zoey, Ira and his mother, she is determined to be nice to him after he saves the life of Ira's mother. Meanwhile, Maryann and Dick work on their co-dependency issues, and Ira tries to improve his relationship with his mother.
83	20	"Farewell, My Sweet"	David Trainer	Story by : David Jackson Willis & Stephanie Novik; Teleplay by : Kim Fiese & Michael Poryes	June 15, 1998	421	7.78
Cybill and Maryann each get a shock when Cybill discovers that she is allergic to chocolate and Maryann gets a surprise visit from her parents, who are in town for a bowling tournament.
84	21	"Daddy"	David Trainer	Story by : William Lucas Walker; Teleplay by : Michael Poryes & Linda Wallem	June 22, 1998	414	6.83
Cybill's Daddy, who failed to show up for Christmas, breezes into town with news that he has gotten Cybill a plum spot on a TV show about Southern women who have made it big. But it is just another disappointment for Cybill when she realizes he has done it to promote his failing car dealership. NOTE: Since this episode ends with the announcement of Cybill's mother's death, it obviously was intended to air before "Bakersfield", although the production codes do not seem to indicate that.
85	22	"Don Gianni"	Jonathan Weiss	Story by : Cybill Shepherd; Teleplay by : Maria A. Brown & William Lucas Walker	June 29, 1998	422	6.65
When Zoey's first love, Gianni, visits from Italy and steals her heart with his good looks, charm and romantic gestures, Cybill suspects he will soon propose marriage. Unfortunately, the seemingly perfect Italian turns out be a cad who makes a secret pass at Cybill behind Zoey's back. After rejecting the overly-amorous suitor, Cybill must decide whether or not to break her daughter's heart and tell her the truth. Meanwhile, Maryann is bent on wreaking cruel revenge on the lecherous Gianni.
86	23	"Cybill in the Morning"	David Trainer	Story by : Susan Nirah Jaffe; Teleplay by : Erin A. Bishop & Linda Wallem	July 6, 1998	423	7.4
Cybill is thrilled when she gets a job hosting a popular morning talk show - until she discovers that her co-host is a prissy, jealous domestic goddess-type who enjoys playing live, on-air practical jokes on Cybill. Adding to her troubles, Cybill finds herself both sexually attracted to and morally repulsed by her deceitful new producer (Charles Rocket). Meanwhile, Ira stands in as Cybill's best friend and advisor while Maryann goes on a shopping spree in Paris.
87	24	"Ka-Boom!"	David Trainer	Story by : Howard M. Gould; Teleplay by : Mike Langworthy	July 13, 1998	424	8.94
When the scheming Dr. Dick tricks Maryann into signing a form that gives him control of her fortune, Cybill must help her friend cope with being poor. The two women plot a horrible revenge against Dr. Dick and find themselves on the wrong side of the law when their vengeful prank goes a little too far. Meanwhile, Cybill and her new morning show producer finally reveal their mutual attraction for each other, only to discover that the show has been cancelled. This episode ends with the words "To Be Continued..." on the screen.
