= The Hellfire Club (film) =

1964 British film by Robert S. Baker and Monty Berman

- Directed by: Robert S. Baker; Monty Berman
- Written by: Leon Griffiths; Jimmy Sangster
- Produced by: Robert S. Baker; Monty Berman
- Starring: Keith Michell; Adrienne Corri
- Cinematography: Robert S. Baker; Monty Berman
- Edited by: Frederick Wilson
- Music by: Clifton Parker
- Distributed by: Regal Films International (UK); Embassy Pictures (US)
- Release date: February 1961
- Running time: 94 minutes
- Country: United Kingdom
- Language: English

The Hellfire Club is a 1961 British film directed by Robert S. Baker and Monty Berman and starring Keith Michell, Miles Malleson and Francis Matthews, with Peter Cushing in a cameo role. It was written by Leon Griffiths and Jimmy Sangster.

== Plot ==
Lady Netherden's husband is the leader of the infamous eighteenth century Hellfire Club. She deserts him, taking with her their son Jason. After her death in a coaching accident, Jason is raised in a circus by a family retainer. Fifteen years later Jason returns to claim his inheritance, to find that after his father's death his cousin Thomas, now in charge of the Hellfire Club, has usurped his title. Thomas has Jason thrown into prison, but he is rescued by his circus friends and with the assistance of the Prime Minister ultimately regains his rightful title.

== Cast ==
- Keith Michell as Jason
- Adrienne Corri as Isobel
- Peter Cushing as Merryweather
- Peter Arne as Thomas
- Kai Fischer as Yvonne
- David Lodge as Timothy
- Bill Owen as Martin
- Miles Malleson as Judge
- Martin Stephens as Jason as a boy
- Andrew Faulds as Lord Netherden
- Jean Lodge as Lady Netherden
- Francis Matthews as Sir Hugh Manning
- Desmond Walter-Ellis as Lord Chorley
- Denis Shaw as Sir Richard
- Tutte Lemkow as Higgins

== Reception ==
Kinematograph Weekly said it "found a ready market."

The Monthly Film Bulletin wrote: "All the old clichés are revived, without a trace of distinction in either writing or direction, in this broad, ribald, and ingenuous costume melodrama. Keith Michell plays the brash Jason with unflagging Fairbanksian energy and good humour; unfortunately his determination to see the joke (his pose as an effeminate French peer is altogether too much of a good thing) is shared only too readily by the majority of the cast, to an extent which prejudices the audience's willing participation. The debaucheries of the Hellfire Club strike an extremely jaded note, Kai Fischer's hoydenish heroine is peculiarly resistible, and only Adrienne Corri's two-faced Lady Isobel makes a creditable impression."

Kine Weekly wrote: "The picture, gamy stuff made from a popular recipe, is served piping hot against lush interiors and exteriors. Keith Michell, whose athletic prowess evokes happy memories of Douglas Fairbanks, Snr., contributes a tireless performance as Jason, Kai Fischer, sporting a daringly low neckline, is a tantalising, though steadfast, Yvonne. Adrienne Corri scores in contrast as the haughty, two-faced Isobel, Peter Arne makes a thoroughly evil Thomas and Bill Owen introduces some down-to-earth humour as Martin. The scenes during which Jason poses as a French marquis are a bit much, but the events that lead up to them, including the break from Newgate and the goings-on in the Hellfire Club, where, possibly striptease was invented, are gloriously uninhibited, and the finale has everything."

Leslie Halliwell said: "Sprightly historical romantic melodrama alightly based on the nefarious activities of the real Hellfire Club; energetic and entertaining if slightly too jokey."

Glenn Erickson claims that the film did good box-office when released in America, on the back of publicity (such as a Playboy photo-spread) that suggested more nudity and adult content than actually appeared in any U.S. prints.

In a 2012 review, Time Out called the film "Surprisingly light on debauchery and occasionally perhaps too jocular for its own good" but rated Michell's performance as "suitably energetic".

The Radio Times Guide to Films gave the film 2/5 stars, writing: "Depravity, debauchery and devil worship? There's nothing of the sort in this would-be horror flick, in which such sins are sadly bleached of any lurid content."
