= Patricia Bredin =

English actress and singer (1935–2023)

Background information
- Also known as: Pat Bredin; Patricia Bredin-McCulloch
- Born: 14 February 1935; Hull, East Riding of Yorkshire, England
- Died: 13 August 2023 (aged 88) Nova Scotia, Canada
- Occupations: Singer, actress
- Instrument: Vocals
- Years active: 1957–1969
- Spouses: Ivor Emmanuel (m. 1964; div. 1966) Charles MacCulloch (m. 1979; died 1979)

Patricia Bredin (14 February 1935 – 13 August 2023) was an English actress and one-time singer. She is best known as the first representative of the United Kingdom in the Eurovision Song Contest in 1957

== Career ==
In 1957 Bredin took the part of Molly, the island girl, in the original cast of the musical Free as Air, in which she starred with Gillian Lewis.

Bredin took part in the Eurovision Song Contest 1957 in Frankfurt and finished in seventh place out of ten entries with the song "All", the first-ever song sung in English at Eurovision. At 1:52, "All" was for a long time the shortest performance in the history of the contest. The record was broken in 2015 when Finland's Pertti Kurikan Nimipäivät performed "Aina mun pitää", which was only 1:27 long.

In 1959, she starred in the British comedy film Left Right and Centre with Ian Carmichael. This saw British exhibitors vote her one of the most promising British new stars along with Peter Sellers and Hayley Mills. On Boxing Day in 1959 she appeared in the BBC TV's long running variety show The Good Old Days, which was rescreened on Boxing Day 2016 on BBC4 as part of the BBC's celebration of the programme.

The following year she had a leading part in another film, the period adventure The Treasure of Monte Cristo, and also starred with Sid James in Desert Mice.

Bredin succeeded Julie Andrews as Guenevere in the Broadway production of Camelot. She played the role from 16 April 1962 until she was replaced by Janet Pavek three months later.

== Personal life and death ==
Patricia Bredin was born on 14 February 1935. In 1964, she married Welsh singer Ivor Emmanuel. They had no children, and divorced within two years.

Bredin later married Canadian businessman Charles MacCulloch, but he died on their honeymoon. As Patricia Bredin-McCulloch, she built up a herd of cows on their estate and looked after them for nearly ten years, before financial complications brought her cattle breeding to an end. She published some reminiscences about this period of her life in My Fling on the Farm (1989).

Bredin died in Nova Scotia on 13 August 2023, at the age of 88.

== Selected filmography ==
- Left Right and Centre (1959) – Left – Stella Stoker
- The Bridal Path (1959) – Margaret
- Make Mine a Million (1959) – Herself, Cameo appearance
- Desert Mice (1959) – Susan
- The Treasure of Monte Cristo (1961) – Pauline
- To Have and to Hold (1963) – Lucy

Awards and achievements
Preceded by Debut entry	United Kingdom in the Eurovision Song Contest; 1957	Succeeded by Pearl Carr and Teddy Johnson with "Sing, Little Birdie"
