= Salad (disambiguation) =

Salad is a type of food dish.

Salad or salads may also refer to:

== Arts, entertainment, and media ==
- Salad (band), a Dutch-British pop band
- Salad Fingers, a Flash cartoon by David Firth
- The Salads, a Canadian rock band

== Other uses ==
- Mahad Mohamed Salad, a Somali politician
- Salad grind, a skateboarding trick
- Word salad, confused or unintelligible speech

== See also ==
- Salad Days (disambiguation)
- Salade, a war helmet
- Lettuce, a variety of plants often incorrectly referred to as salad
