= Salad Days (1958 film) =

Salad Days was a 45-minute Australian telecast of the play Salad Days, which toured there starring Judy Banks in 1958. Directed by Arthur Wyndham, it aired from the Elizabethan Theatre, Sydney, on ABN-2 on 16 April, the first live musical televised in the country from the professional stage. The previous year the Australian Broadcasting Corporation had broadcast a TV revue.
