= Sam Peckinpah's "Salad Days" =

Monty Python sketch

"Sam Peckinpah's 'Salad Days'" is a sketch from the 7th episode of the third series of the British television programme Monty Python's Flying Circus.

== Plot ==
The sketch begins with a preamble by Eric Idle (impersonating the British film critic Philip Jenkinson), who praises American film director Sam Peckinpah's predilection for the "utterly truthful and very sexually arousing portrayal of violence [sniff] in its starkest form" in Major Dundee (1965), The Wild Bunch (1969) and Straw Dogs (1971). Throughout this speech, he constantly sniffs, despite onscreen captions telling him to stop. He then segues to a clip from Peckinpah's latest project, which is an adaptation of the musical Salad Days.

Well-dressed, well-spoken, upper-class youngsters frolic in an idyllic garden around an upright piano, responding enthusiastically to Michael Palin's suggestion of a game of tennis. Things go awry when Palin is struck in the face by the ball, causing blood to seep through his fingers. He reflexively flings his racquet out of shot; we then see that it has become embedded in the stomach of a pretty girl (Nicki Howorth), who faints, tearing off Idle's arm in the process. Idle staggers across to the piano and slams down the lid, severing both hands of the pianist (John Cleese). The piano then collapses in slow motion, intercut with shots of screaming women, who are crushed to death. Somehow, Graham Chapman gets impaled by the piano keyboard, which slices off a woman's head when he turns around.

The sketch then cuts back to the studio, prompting Idle to smugly remark "Pretty strong meat there from [sniff] Sam Peckinpah!" before he is gunned down in slow motion, with much spurting blood (and the caption "Tee Hee").

The end credits roll over his dying agonies, before a serious-sounding Cleese reads an apology to everyone in the entire world (which states that "they didn't mean it"), and that while they all came from broken homes and have very unhappy personal lives (especially Idle), they are actually nice, warm people underneath and urging the viewers not to write or phone complaints about the sketch since the BBC is going through an unhappy phase due to its father dying (Lord Reith had indeed died the previous year) "and BBC 2 going out with men". A second voiceover by Idle disputes the first voiceover and mentions that the BBC is "very happy at home" and that the "BBC 2 is bound to go through this phase".

This is followed by Richard Baker in a news desk reporting the news (which is filled with running jokes from the preceding sketches, such as the phrase Lemon Curry), then by a deliberately tranquil final scene of waves crashing against a shore. Cleese briefly walks into shot in a Conquistador costume, explaining that the beach scene was added to fill in time and apologising for the lack of any more jokes.

== Background ==
The sketch is an example of the Python team's fondness of the 'double spoof', and a forerunner of the mashup genre. It targets both the genteel stage musical and the work of controversial director Peckinpah and his exaggeration of extreme bloodshed and violence in his films. By the time the sketch was shown in 1972, Peckinpah had achieved notoriety for the level of violence in his films, particularly Straw Dogs which received an X rating by the BBFC. The sketch also mentions contemporary director Ken Russell.

Director Ian MacNaughton insisted on deliberately using an excessive level of blood, telling the production team that it "cannot be overdone". The slow-motion technique of the shooting of Idle's character parodies Franco Arcalli's editing of Michelangelo Antonioni's film Zabriskie Point.

This sketch follows the famous Cheese Shop sketch in the television episode.

== Reaction ==
Peckinpah reportedly loved this sketch and enjoyed showing it to friends and family. Peckinpah later became a friend and drinking companion of Graham Chapman when Chapman moved to Los Angeles in the late 1970s. Peter Cook recalled a drinking session with Chapman, Peckinpah, and Keith Moon, brainstorming ideas for the movie Yellowbeard.

Robert Hewison's book Monty Python: The Case Against contains extracts from a BBC viewers panel's response to the show, and there were complaints that this particular sketch was "horrific", "sick", and "unnecessary".

== See also ==
- Auteur theory
- New Hollywood
- Bring Me the Head of Charlie Brown
