= Charles Romalotti =

American author of punk fiction (born 1970)

Charles Romalotti is an American author of punk fiction. Born on February 10, 1970, in Topeka, Kansas, he is the author of two novels, Salad Days and Pariah, both released by Layman Books. He currently resides in Austin, Texas.

== Novels ==
=== Salad Days ===
Romalotti's debut novel, Salad Days, was released on June 1, 2000. It is the story of Frank Smith, a determined idealist who is the vocalist for a hardcore punk rock band in the mid-1980s. The novel is known for its accurate portrayal of the punk subculture, and it incorporates actual bands (Black Flag, Bad Brains, Descendents) and venues (Outhouse, CBGB's, and City Gardens) from the mid-1980s punk era into its fictional plot. Salad Days has maintained a strong international cult following since its release.

=== Pariah ===
On June 1, 2001, Romalotti's second novel, Rash, was released. Much darker in tone than its predecessor, Rash was a suspenseful tale about a group of kids ("Crusties") living on the streets of Austin, Texas, in the late-1990s. In 2002, Rash was a finalist for Best Horror in the Independent Publisher Book Awards (IPPY Awards). The initial print run of 1,000 copies sold out within the first 18 months of its release. There was not a second print run (aside from its release in Pariah), and copies are rare.

Talon, the sequel to Rash, was released on June 1, 2002. A third story, The Stickler finalized the trilogy, and the entire series was released in a single book called Pariah on June 1, 2003. The Sticker never had its own independent release.

=== Bride of the Reaper ===
Romalotti is working on a new novel with an expected release of Fall 2010. It is titled Bride of the Reaper, similar in tone to Pariah (dark thriller), and is set in the same location (Lawrence, Kansas) and time period (mid-1980s) as Salad Days. Characters from Salad Days are to be featured in cameo roles in Bride of the Reaper. The story revolved around a quirky girl named Kitty Waugh who lands a role as a horror host in a mid-sized Midwest town.

== Bibliography ==
=== Salad Days ===
- Paperback, 2000; ISBN 978-0-9679235-0-5

=== Pariah ===
- Paperback, 2003; ISBN 978-0-9679235-3-6
