= Julian Slade =

British musician (1930–2006)

Julian Slade, 1954

Julian Penkivil Slade (28 May 1930 – 17 June 2006) was an English writer of musical theatre, best known for the show Salad Days, which he wrote in six weeks in 1954, and which became the UK's longest-running show of the 1950s, with over 2,288 performances.

== Biography ==
Born in London, England, in 1930, he moved with his family in 1940 to Painswick, Gloucestershire, where he spent his formative years, becoming a young member of the village dramatic society. He was educated at Eton College and Trinity College, Cambridge, where he was the first Footlights Vice President. After leaving Cambridge he went on to the drama school at the Bristol Old Vic.

During his time at the Old Vic, Slade wrote incidental music for several productions including Two Gentlemen of Verona and The Duenna. In 1954, he was asked to write a musical for the Old Vic Summer Season. It was then that he came up with Salad Days with Dorothy Reynolds. The show was such a success that it moved to London, where it ran for over 2,288 performances - a record at the time. It was in London that a young Cameron Mackintosh saw the show with his aunt and decided to become a theatrical producer. Slade and Mackintosh stayed close friends throughout his life.

Slade's second most successful musical was Free as Air, written with Dorothy Reynolds, which opened at the Opera House in Manchester in 1957, before moving to the Savoy Theatre, London, where it ran for 417 performances.

== Personal life ==
He had two brothers, Adrian Slade CBE (Liberal Party President) and Sir Christopher Slade (Lord Justice of Appeal, 1982–1991), and a sister. Julian and Sandy, the polari-speaking homosexual thespians of the radio show Round the Horne, were named after Slade and fellow musical playwright Sandy Wilson.

Slade died of cancer on 17 June 2006, aged 76.

== Shows ==
- Christmas in King Street (1952)
- The Merry Gentleman (1953)
- Salad Days (1954)
- The Comedy of Errors (1954 television, 1956 stage)
- Free As Air (1957)
- Hooray For Daisy (1959)
- Follow That Girl (1960), adapted from Christmas in King Street
- Wildest Dreams (1960)
- The Gay Chaperone (1961), adapted from The Duenna
- Vanity Fair (1962)
- Nutmeg and Ginger (1963)
- The Pursuit of Love (1967)
- Winnie the Pooh (1970)
- Trelawny (1972)
- Out Of Bounds (1973)
- Love in a Cold Climate

Preceded by No prior incumbent	Footlights Vice President; 1950–1951	Succeeded by Robin Tuck
