= Dorothy Reynolds =

British writer and actress

- Born: 26 January 1913
- Died: 7 April 1977 (aged 64)
- Occupation(s): Actress and writer

Dorothy Reynolds (26 January 1913 – 7 April 1977) was a British writer and actress.

She is mainly known for writing a number of musicals in collaboration with Julian Slade. The best known were Salad Days and Free as Air.

== Filmography ==
- Lady L (1965)
- Oh! What a Lovely War (1969) - Heckler at Pankhurst Speech
