= Salad Days (musical) =

Musical

- Original cast recording, 1954
- Music: Julian Slade
- Lyrics: Julian Slade and Dorothy Reynolds
- Productions: 1954 Bristol; 1954 West End; 1958 New York; 1976 West End revival 1996 West End revival 2009–12 Hammersmith (two revivals)

Salad Days is a musical with music by Julian Slade, and with book and lyrics by Dorothy Reynolds and Julian Slade. The musical was initially performed in 1954 in the UK in Bristol and then in the West End, where it ran for 2,283 performances.

== Background ==
Julian Slade and Dorothy Reynolds had been working together on writing musicals since 1952, writing the book, music and lyrics. Reynolds was also an actress. They wrote Salad Days as a "summer musical for the Bristol Old Vic's resident company."

The title is taken from William Shakespeare's Antony and Cleopatra: "My salad days, When I was green in judgment, cold in blood, To say as I said then!", and the phrase has come to be used generally to refer to one's days of youthful inexperience. The musical's enduring popularity lies in its light-hearted innocence and apparent simplicity, in sharp contrast to the many "hard-nosed" American musicals of the era, and its bright score including the songs "We Said We Wouldn't Look Back", "I Sit in the Sun", and "We're Looking for a Piano".

== Synopsis ==
Jane Raeburn and Timothy Dawes meet in a park, soon after their graduation, to plan their lives. They agree to get married, and do so in secret, but Timothy's parents have urged him to ask his various influential uncles—a minister, a Foreign Office official, a general, a scientist—to find him suitable employment. He and Jane, however, decide that he must take the first job that he is offered. A passing tramp offers them £7 a week to look after his mobile piano for a month, and, upon accepting, they discover that when the piano plays it gives everyone within earshot an irresistible desire to dance.

After attempts by the Minister of Pleasure and Pastime (Timothy's Ministerial uncle) to ban the disruptive music, the piano vanishes, and Timothy enlists his scientific Uncle Zed to take them in his flying saucer to retrieve it. When it is found, the tramp reappears to tell them that their month is up and the piano must be passed on to another couple. He also reveals that he is a hitherto unknown uncle of Timothy (whose parents had referred to as "the one we don't mention"). Timothy and Jane look forward to the future with confidence.

== Musical numbers ==
Act I

- "Opening" – Orchestra
- "The Things That Are Done by a Don" – Company
- "We Said We Wouldn't Look Back" – Jane and Timothy
- "Find Yourself Something to Do" – Father, Mother, Aunt Prue, and Timothy
- "I Sit in the Sun" – Jane
- "Oh, Look at Me!" – Jane and Timothy
- "Hush Hush" – Uncle Clam, Fosdyke, and Timothy
- "Oh, Look at Me!" (Reprise) – Company
- "Out of Breath" – Company

Act II

- "Cleopatra" – Manager
- "Sand in My Eyes" – Asphynxia
- "It's Easy to Sing" – Timothy, Jane and Nigel
- "We're Looking for a Piano" – Company
- "The Time of My Life" – Jane
- "The Saucer Song" – Jane, Timothy, and Uncle Zed
- "We Don't Understand Our Children" – Timothy's Mother and Jane's Mother
- "Oh, Look at Me!" (Reprise) – Company
- "We Said We Wouldn't Look Back" (Reprise) – Jane and Timothy

== Productions ==
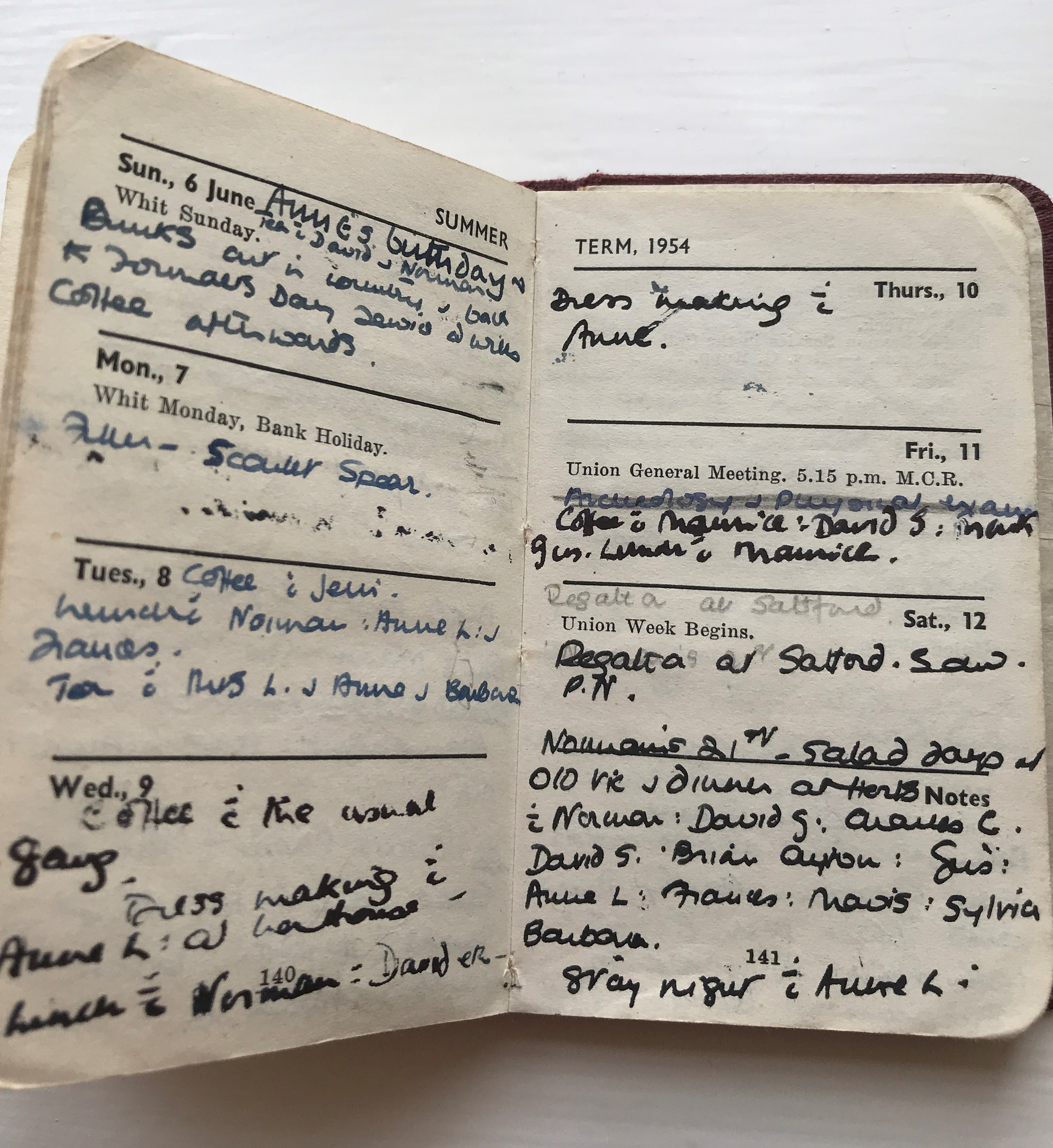
Diary showing performance of Salad Days on Saturday 12 June 1954 at Bristol Old Vic.

Salad Days premiered in the UK with the Bristol Old Vic at the Theatre Royal, Bristol in June 1954, and transferred to the Vaudeville Theatre in London on 5 August 1954, running for 2,283 performances to become the longest-running show in musical theatre history until overtaken by My Fair Lady in the U.S. (1956) and Oliver! in the U.K. (1960). In the Evening Standard Awards for 1955, Salad Days was given the Award for Most Enjoyable Show (although The Pajama Game won as Best Musical). The musical was produced by Denis Carey, with dances arranged by Elizabeth West, and with a cast that featured Dorothy Reynolds in a variety of roles, John Warner as Timothy and Eleanor Drew as Jane. Slade played one of the two pianos. The reviewer in The Guardian wrote: "There is no pointed satire, only a passable line of wit, but the effect is one of genuine high spirits and those who liked it on Thursday were ready to call it the gayest piece of entertainment since The Mikado. Others were heard to compare it to a children's party, meaning that they found the fun jejune, 'undergraduate,' and limited." It played to over 1.25 million people and grossed over $1.8 million.

The Canadian premiere of Salad Days in 1956 was at the Hart House Theatre, University of Toronto for several months with Barry Morse as director and Alan Lund as choreographer. The Canadian cast included Jack Creley, Betty Leighton, Barbara Franklin, John Clark, Roland Bull, Norma Renault and Eric Christmas. The show transferred to the Royal Alexandra Theatre and then to Her Majesty's Theatre in Montreal. Morse wrote that it played "successfully" and was "again a triumph". Morse revived the production at the Crest Theatre, Toronto, and then brought it to New York with a slightly different cast. The New York production, featuring Richard Easton, opened at the Barbizon Plaza Theatre (then located at Avenue of the Americas and 58th Street) on 10 November 1958, and ran for 80 performances. Morse described the theatre as "not a Broadway theatre ... a perfectly comfortable and centrally situated theatre which was housed in a hotel." He further wrote "as rotten luck would have it there was a newspaper strike which started just a few days before we opened." There were no reviews, and the show closed in January 1959 when, according to Morse, "our financial resources were used up."

The show was revived in the West End in April 1976 at The Duke of York's Theatre, running for 133 performances, and featured Elizabeth Seal. Salad Days was next revived in April 1996 at London's Vaudeville Theatre, directed by Ned Sherrin and featuring Simon Connolly, Nicola Fulljames and Richard Sisson. In his review for The Guardian, Michael Billington wrote: "Time has also changed both the show and our attitude towards it. What seemed hopelessly innocent in 1954 has now acquired the patina of camp."

The show received a new production by Tête à Tête opera company, directed by Bill Bankes-Jones, originally produced in November 2009 at Riverside Studios in London, and revived for over two months in 2010–11. That revival was a sell-out and the production was revived again for Christmas & New Year 2012–13 at Riverside Studios

== Recordings ==
The Original Cast recording (1954) was recorded by Oriole Records. The Original Cast recording of the Duke of York's Theatre revival was released by That's Entertainment. A 40th anniversary studio cast recording was produced by EMI in 1994, featuring Janie Dee. and an Original Cast recording of the 40th anniversary production at the Vaudeville Theatre was released by First Night, consisting of four songs.

It was filmed for Australian television in 1958.

== Cultural impact ==
The musical was parodied, in a particularly bloody manner, by Monty Python in their sketch "Sam Peckinpah's Salad Days".

£7,000 from the Salad Days profits – a large sum in those days— was given to the Bristol Old Vic Theatre School towards the purchase and conversion of two large adjoining Victorian villas at 1 and 2 Downside Road in Clifton. In 1995 the enduring benefit to students of that donation was formally recognised when a new custom-built dance and movement studio in the School's back garden was named the Slade/Reynolds Studio.
