= Backyard wrestling =

Amateur emulation of professional wrestling

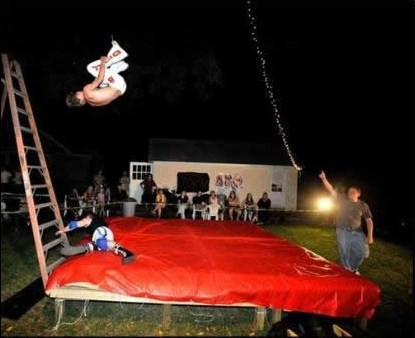
A backyard wrestler falling towards a cloth covered table as his opponent rolls out of the way of the move.

Backyard wrestling (BYW), also referred to as yarding or backyarding, is an underground hobby and sport involving untrained practices of professional-style wrestling, typically in a low-budget environment, such as a backyard. Although not legitimized, backyard wrestling is often organized into promotions, mimicking actual professional wrestling. Most backyard wrestlers are merely emulating modern wrestling, though a small percentage have experience from enrolling in wrestling school or from referring to how-to guides on the internet.

== History ==
Pro wrestling personnel are generally opposed to backyard wrestling. Its peak years of popularity were 1996-2001, during a boom period of professional wrestling, notoriously known as The Attitude Era, when high-risk stunts exerted a strong influence on the wrestling fan base, particularly those performed by Mick Foley. In the late 1980s and early 1990s, backyard wrestling often appealed to media as a good-natured topic, but it increasingly turned reckless and ultra-violent, worrying parents and wrestling companies. In response, WWE began airing advertisements stressing the dangers and seeking to deter fans from duplicating the actions seen in their ring.

In addition to actual backyards, backyard wrestling can occur in spaces including parks, fields, and warehouses. Initially camcorder-filmed events were shared person-to-person; increasingly public-access television and the internet have come to be used. It has also broken into the media with several Best of Backyard Wrestling volumes produced, two video games entitled Backyard Wrestling: Don't Try This at Home and Backyard Wrestling 2: There Goes the Neighborhood, and a 2002 documentary entitled The Backyard, showcasing backyard wrestling under a more mainstream light as it follows several wrestlers and federations from all over the world, detailing the different styles and portrayals of backyard wrestling. In an interview, the director Paul Hough compared The Backyard to Beyond the Mat, but with yarders.

In May 2015, Global News ran a story on "Vancouver Backyard Wrestling", a backyard wrestling organization in the Pacific Northwest of Canada, that produces wrestling episodes for public streaming services. The segment, hosted by sports director and anchor Squire Barns, follows the crew as they prepare for the release of the organization's biggest event, Yardstock 2015.

== Backyarders who became notable professional wrestlers ==
- Matt and Jeff Hardy created a backyard promotion known as the Trampoline Wrestling Federation as teenagers in the early 1990s.
- CM Punk began his career as a backyard wrestler; Punk created his own backyard promotion called the Lunatic Wrestling Federation alongside his brother Mike and their friends in the mid-late 1990s.
- The Young Bucks, Matt and Nick Jackson, ran a backyard wrestling promotion known as the Kids Backyard Wrestling Association (later Backyard Wrestling Association) as teenagers growing up in Rancho Cucamonga, California in the mid-to-late 1990s. Brandon Cutler was a friend who became a roster member alongside his brother Dustin (who also later briefly wrestled professionally).
- Liv Morgan participated in backyard wrestling with her siblings. She has described the matches as her first foray into wrestling.
- Will Ospreay and Kip Sabian were backyard wrestlers together in England before becoming formally trained professional wrestlers.
- Sonjay Dutt and Ruckus used to backyard wrestle together in high school.
- Matt Cross and Scorpio Sky developed their future professional wrestling names during their days as backyard wrestlers; Cross coined his famous "M-Dogg 20" name, while Sky (real name: Schuyler Andrews) originally competed as "Scorpion Sky Andrews".
- Fuego Del Sol and Myron Reed originally created their backyard wrestling "promotions" on YouTube, where they competed as "KAGE" and "The Bad Reed" respectively.
- Insane Clown Posse (Violent J and Shaggy 2 Dope) started their wrestling careers in backyard wrestling where they would start their own backyard promotion called Tag Team Wrestling, later renamed National All Star Wrestling. They would later go on to wrestle for ECW, WWF, WCW and TNA and would go on to start their own promotion, JCW.

== Backyard wrestling in mass media ==
=== Television ===
- MTV's True Life: I'm A Backyard Wrestler
- Squire's Take: low budget backyard wrestling
- The Ricki Lake Show: "Backyard Bloodbath!"

=== Films and documentaries ===
- The Backyard
- Best of Backyard Wrestling Vol. 1-6
- CNN News: Backyard Beatdown (2006 Hardcore vs Non)
- Traces of Death V: Back in Action
- Backyard Dogs
- NWF Kids Pro Wrestling: The Untold Story
- The Link, documentary
- Backyard Wrestling (2002)
- Death Death Documentary (2007)
- The Backyard Wrestler - The Life and Times of Aston Crude (2020)

=== Video games ===
- Backyard Wrestling: Don't Try This at Home
- Backyard Wrestling 2: There Goes the Neighborhood

== See also ==
- Styles of wrestling
