= Mr. Sardonicus =

1961 film by William Castle

- Theatrical release poster
- Directed by: William Castle
- Written by: Ray Russell
- Based on: "Sardonicus" by Ray Russell
- Produced by: William Castle
- Starring: Oskar Homolka; Ronald Lewis; Audrey Dalton; Guy Rolfe; Vladimir Sokoloff
- Cinematography: Burnett Guffey
- Music by: Von Dexter
- Distributed by: Columbia Pictures
- Release date: October 18, 1961
- Running time: 89 minutes
- Country: United States
- Language: English

Mr. Sardonicus is a 1961 horror film produced and directed by William Castle, based on the short story "Sardonicus" by Ray Russell, who also wrote the screenplay. It stars Oscar Homolka, Vladimir Sokoloff, Guy Rolfe and Audrey Dalton.

It tells the story of Baron Sardonicus, a man whose face becomes frozen in a horrifying grin while robbing his father Henryk Toleslawski's grave to obtain a winning lottery ticket. Castle cited the film in his memoir as one of his favorites to produce.

Mr. Sardonicus was theatrically released by Columbia on October 18, 1961. It played on a double feature with Valley of the Dragons (1961) beginning on October 25, 1961.

== Plot ==
In 1880, in the fictional central European country of Gorslava, prominent London physician Sir Robert Cargrave visits the mysterious Baron Sardonicus at the urgent request of Robert's former love, Maude, now the baron's wife. Sir Robert becomes apprehensive when his local inquiries about Sardonicus are met with fear. When Sir Robert arrives at Castle Sardonicus, he sees Sardonicus' servant Krull torturing the baron's maid Anna with leeches. Krull mollifies Sir Robert's ire by claiming he was treating Anna with bloodletting.

Maude is afraid of what might happen if Sir Robert refuses Sardonicus's requests. Convinced that Maude despises him, Sardonicus bribes women to his chambers and terrifies the locals with his sadism.

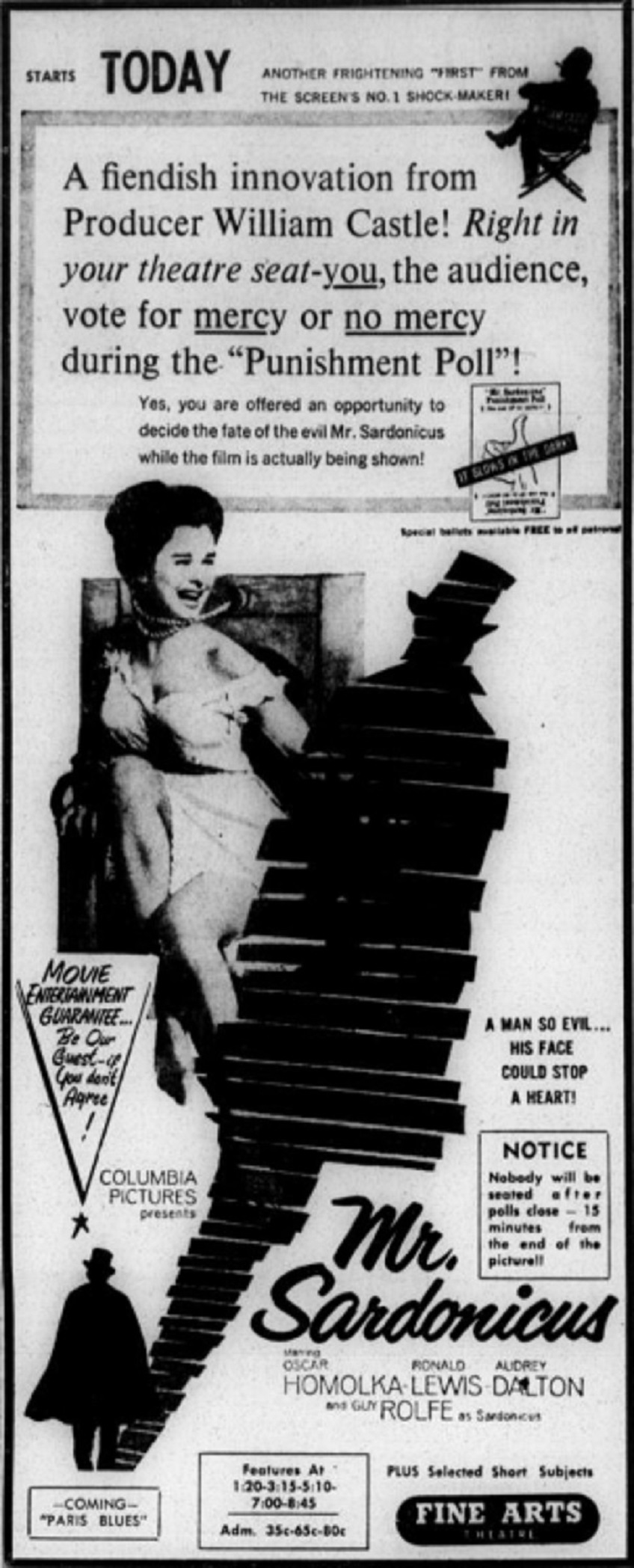
Advertisement from 1961

Sardonicus tells his story to Sir Robert. He was born Marek Toleslawski, a farmer like his father Henryk. Marek and his wife Elenka lived a humble life with his father, but Elenka and Henryk wanted more. Henryk bought a ticket for the national lottery but died before the drawing; after his burial, Marek and Elenka discovered that the ticket had won but had been buried with Henryk. Elenka insisted that Marek retrieve the ticket from the grave to prove his love to her. Upon opening the grave, Marek was traumatized by the sight of Henryk's partially rotted, "grinning" face. Marek's face was frozen in a similar horrifying grin, leaving him unable to speak intelligibly or chew food. Elenka, terrified by the transformation, committed suicide. The lottery prize allowed Marek to buy a title and a castle, but he had no one to share them with. Marek renamed himself "Sardonicus" and hired speech experts to retrain him to speak. He conducted experiments on young women to find a cure for his condition, but had no success. He learned from his new wife, Maude, that Sir Robert was a great doctor specializing in paralysis, and hoped Sir Robert could restore his face.

Sir Robert agrees to try, but he is unsuccessful. Sardonicus demands he try more experimental treatments. When Sir Robert refuses on the grounds that they could kill Sardonicus, Sardonicus threatens to mutilate Maude's face to match his own. Sir Robert sends for a deadly South American plant and experiments with diluted extracts on dogs, hoping to develop a variant that will relax Sardonicus's facial muscles without fatally relaxing his heart and lung muscles as well. When Sir Robert balks at using the first variant to have a surviving test subject, Sardonicus coerces him by locking Maude in a room with Henryk's open coffin. This gives Sir Robert an idea: he will inject Sardonicus with plant extract, then recreate the trauma that caused Sardonicus's condition. The operation is a success, and Sardonicus's face is restored. Sir Robert advises him not to speak until his facial muscles have had time to adjust. The baron writes a note annulling his marriage to Maude, and another to Sir Robert asking his fee. Sir Robert refuses any fee, and Sardonicus lets them go.

As they prepare to leave by train, Krull arrives, imploring them to return. Sardonicus has lost the power of speech again, and he cannot open his jaw or lips. Sir Robert tells Krull that the injection was a placebo, and Sardonicus's affliction was only psychosomatic. Once Sardonicus realizes this, he will be completely restored.

Krull returns to the castle. Upon seeing Sardonicus suffering, he puts his hand up to his scarred left eyelid, remembering how Sardonicus plucked that eye out as punishment for disobedience. Rather than relaying Sir Robert's news, he instead tells the baron that he missed Sir Robert's train. Krull sits down to eat his lavish dinner in front of Baron Sardonicus, who continues to suffer, and is doomed to starve.

== Cast ==
- Oskar Homolka as Krull
- Ronald Lewis as Sir Robert Cargrave
- Audrey Dalton as Maude Sardonicus
- Guy Rolfe as Baron Sardonicus / Marek Toleslawski
- Vladimir Sokoloff as Henryk Toleslawski
- Erika Peters as Elenka
- Lorna Hanson as Anna

== Production ==
Guy Rolfe displays the make-up used to transform him into Mr. Sardonicus.

William Castle purchased the rights to the short story "Sardonicus" and hired its author, Ray Russell, to write the screenplay. Ronald Lewis was imported from England, where he had made The Full Treatment and Taste of Fear for Hammer, to play a lead role.

To achieve Baron Sardonicus's terrible grin, Guy Rolfe was subjected to five separate facial appliance fittings. He could not physically stand to wear the piece for more than an hour at a time. As a result, the full makeup is only shown in a few scenes, with Rolfe instead wearing a mask over his face for most of the running time.

Castle, with his reputation as the "king of gimmicks" to market his films, built the marketing for the film around the idea of the two possible endings. Near the end of the film, audiences were given the opportunity to participate in the "Punishment Poll". Each movie patron was given a glow-in-the-dark card featuring a hand with the thumb out. At the appropriate time, they voted by holding up the card with either the thumb up or down as to whether Sardonicus would live or die.

The "poll" scene, as presented in the film, is hosted by Castle himself. He is shown pretending to address the audience, jovially egging them on to choose punishment, and "tallying" the poll results with no break in continuity as the "punishment" ending is pronounced the winner. Castle, in his autobiography Step Right Up! I'm Gonna Scare the Pants Off America, claimed the idea for two different endings came from the Columbia Pictures' dissatisfaction with the downbeat ending of the original story and script, so "I would have two endings, Columbia's and mine, and let the audience decide for themselves the fate of Mr. Sardonicus." The alternate "merciful" ending purportedly showed Sardonicus being cured and surviving (although co-star Audrey Dalton claims no such ending was ever shot). Given that Turner Classic Movies was unable to locate any cut of the film which included the "merciful" ending, the suggestion of alternative endings itself appears to have been an elaborate conceit on the part of Castle in service of the "gimmick". Castle claimed in his book, "Invariably, the audience's verdict was thumbs down... Contrary to some opinions (just in case the audience voted for mercy) we had the other ending. But it was rarely, if ever, used." The consensus among film historians appears to be that no other endings were ever filmed.

The "punishment" ending occupies only three minutes of film after the "poll", and was the ending of the original Russell short story.

There are reports that a separate version of the "poll" was produced for drive-ins, in which patrons were asked to flash their cars' headlights to vote. A similar variation was filmed for the drive-in market for Castle's The Tingler, but to date no evidence for any variation of Mr. Sardonicus has come to light.

== Release ==
Mr. Sardonicus was theatrically released by Columbia on October 18, 1961. It played on a double feature with Valley of the Dragons (1961) beginning on October 25, 1961.

== Critical response ==
The film received negative reviews from critics.

Variety wondered if it "may leave some craving for more blood." The PTA Magazine described Mr. Sardonicus as an "elaborately produced [film]... that evokes disgust as well as macabre thrills". The New York Times, while praising Lewis's performance, stated that Castle "is not Edgar Allan Poe. Anybody naive enough to attend...will find painful proof".

AllMovie gave the film a mostly positive review, complimenting the film's mounting tension and suspense, and disturbing make-up effects, calling the film one of Castle's best works. On Rotten Tomatoes the film has an approval rating of 40% based on reviews from 10 critics, with an average rating of 4.6 out of 10.

== Cultural impact ==
The U.S. television series Wiseguy has a story arc about Mark Volchek (Steve Ryan), a rich mining and logging magnate in Washington state who is fixated on Mr. Sardonicus and has comparable emotional issues. He is cured in the episode "Meltdown" by the characters reenacting several scenes from the film and the hypothetical "merciful" ending in which Krull (Oscar Homolka) forgives Sardonicus for taking his eye and tells him how to cure his affliction. Noted film critic Jeffrey Lyons played himself, as part of a comic scene in which OCB agents on the case call on him to explain the film's psychological subtext, but he instead delivers a positive review of the film.

== See also ==
- List of American films of 1961
- The Man Who Laughs (1928 film)
