= Incubus (1981 film) =

Canadian slasher film

- Canadian theatrical release poster
- Directed by: John Hough
- Screenplay by: George Franklin
- Based on: Incubus by Ray Russell
- Produced by: Stephen J. Friedman; Marc Boyman; John M. Eckert
- Starring: John Cassavetes; John Ireland
- Cinematography: Albert J. Dunk
- Edited by: George Appleby
- Music by: Stanley Myers
- Production companies: Mark Film Productions, Inc.
- Distributed by: Pan-Canadian Film Distributors
- Release dates: November 1981 (Paris); February 24, 1982 (France); July 23, 1982 (Tucson)
- Running time: 93 minutes
- Country: Canada
- Language: English
- Budget: CAD5.1 million
- Box office: $5.6 million

Incubus (Note: The film's title card reads merely Incubus, and was copyrighted under this title as well. For its release in the United States, it was marketed as The Incubus.) is a 1981 Canadian supernatural slasher film directed by John Hough and starring John Cassavetes, Kerrie Keane, and John Ireland. The plot focuses on a small Wisconsin town where a mysterious figure is raping and murdering young women. It is based on the 1976 novel of the same name by Ray Russell. The screenplay for the film was originally completed by Sandor Stern, though it was so significantly rewritten by star Cassavetes during production that a pseudonymous "George Franklin" received the official credit as screenwriter.

Principal photography of Incubus took place in Guelph, Ontario in the fall of 1980. Upon its theatrical release in 1982, the film received largely unfavorable reviews, with many citing its plot and overt violence as weaknesses. Despite its critical reception, the film earned approximately $5.6 million at the United States box office.

== Plot ==
In a lake at a rock quarry in rural Wisconsin, a young woman, Mandy Pullman, and her boyfriend, Roy, are swimming. The two spend the night at the lake camping, but are attacked by an unseen figure; Roy is killed, and Mandy violently raped. Mandy is taken to the hospital with a ruptured uterus and serious trauma. As the attack occurs, teenager Tim Galen experiences a recurring nightmare he has in which a woman is tortured by a monstrous figure; his grandmother, Agatha Galen, tries to dissuade him of his suspicions about the premonitory dream. At the hospital, Mandy is treated by Dr. Sam Cordell, a surgeon and physician in the small community of Galen.

Sam's teenage daughter, Jenny, is dating Tim, but he disapproves of their relationship. At the hospital, Sheriff Hank Walden questions Sam about Mandy's injuries, and a nosy local reporter, Laura Kincaid, arrives to question Walden, who forces her to leave. That night at the local library and museum, a librarian, Carolyn Davies, is brutally raped and murdered while closing the building. During her autopsy, Sam finds she suffered similar wounds as Mandy, and finds an inexplicably large amount of semen in her vagina.

Attempts to question the comatose Mandy about her attacker are futile. Sam shows Laura pictures of his deceased second wife and notes their amazing resemblance to each other. The following day, local farmer Ernie Barnes and his two daughters are brutally slain at their farmhouse. Tim again is tormented by his vision, and runs into a local movie theater in an attempt to distract himself. While he is there, a young woman is raped and murdered in the downstairs bathroom of the theater, and the metal stall door is found nearly bent in half. Sheriff Walden and Sam arrive at the crime scene shortly before Laura, who insists she may be able to help the investigation. She confides in Sam that she discovered historical records detailing Satanism and similar crimes occurring throughout the town's history.

Tim confronts Jenny at her home, hysterical, and says he believes his dreams are responsible for the crimes. Sam gets a sample of Tim's semen to compare against that which was found inside the victims, but they do not match. Tim and Agatha meet with Sam, Jenny, Laura, and Sheriff Walden at the library that night, where Laura reads a passage from a book detailing the shapeshifter known as the incubus, which manifests through dreams and can appear in human form. Agatha reveals that Tim's mother had died before his birth and had been accused of witchcraft due to psychic powers she possessed; Agatha claims that the Galen family has a legacy of witch hunters, and that his dreams are a result of this.

Laura and Tim return with Sam and Jenny to their home. As Laura takes Jenny upstairs to go to bed, Sam attempts to induce Tim's dream to prove its connection to the murders. Tim goes into a seizure-like state and runs upstairs into Jenny's room where he tries to attack Laura with a dagger given to him by Agatha, but Sam intervenes and stabs him to death. Laura then approaches Sam, and her face briefly shifts into that of the monstrous incubus; it is revealed that Laura has in fact been the incubus all along, manifesting in female form. As Laura embraces Sam, he looks over her shoulder to see Jenny's dead body lying on her bed, blood pouring out from between her legs.

== Cast ==
- John Cassavetes as Sam Cordell
- John Ireland as Hank Walden
- Kerrie Keane as Laura Kincaid
- Erin Noble as Jenny Cordell
- Helen Hughes as Agatha Galen
- Duncan McIntosh as Tim Galen
- Harvey Atkin as Joe Prescott
- Harry Ditson as Lieutenant Drivas
- Mitch Martin as Mandy Pullman
- Matt Birman as Roy Seeley
- Beverly Cooper as Pru Keaton
- Brian Young as Charlie Prescott
- Barbara Franklin as Mrs. Pullman
- Wes Lee as Mr. Pullman
- Neil Dainard as Ernie Barnes
- Jennifer Leak as Deena Ferrin
- Denise Fergusson as Carolyn Davies
- Jack Van Evera as Matt Davies
- Helene Udy as Sally Harper
- Lisa Bunting as Anita Barnes
- Michelle Davros as Jane Barnes
- Jefferson Mappin as Clem
- James Bearden as Lacey
- Alan Bridle as Interrogator
- Jude Beny as Witch
- Jeremy Hole as Torturer
- Brian Montague as Swimmer
- Dirk McLean as The Incubus

== Production ==
=== Development ===
The original screenplay for the film, based on Ray Russell's 1976 novel, Incubus, was written by Sandor Stern, who had previously written the screenplay for The Amityville Horror (1979). However, the screenplay was significantly reworked by star John Cassavetes during filming, with director John Hough estimating that around eighty percent of Stern's original work had been rewritten. Because of the retooling of the script, Stern was not credited, and the official credit for the film's screenwriter is a pseudonymous "George Franklin". However, Stern's name was credited in some Canadian trade advertisements for the film shortly after production had wrapped.

=== Filming ===
Incubus was shot near Toronto, Ontario over a period of ten weeks in the fall of 1980, on a budget of CA$5.1 million. Principal photography began September 22, 1980, and was completed November 17, 1980. The film was financed through a Canadian tax shelter. Its actors and cast were asked to sign a secrecy agreement to not discuss the film.

Colin Chilvers designed the film's special makeup effects. Principal photography was completed by mid-November 1980.

The film features the British hard rock band Samson in the form of archival clips taken from the film Biceps of Steel that appear onscreen during a sequence set in a movie theater.

== Release ==
In November 1981, the film was placed into receivership by the Canadian Imperial Bank of Commerce along with several other films made under Canadian tax shelters, including Best Revenge and Mr. Patman. The same month, the film was first exhibited in France at the Paris International Festival of Fantastic and Science-Fiction Film. It was subsequently released in France on February 24, 1982. It was released regionally in the United States in the summer of 1982, with screenings beginning July 23, 1982, in Tucson, Arizona. It later opened in Phoenix on August 27, 1982, and in New York City on September 4, 1982. Its release expanded to cities in New Jersey and California during the autumn of 1982.

=== Home media ===
Incubus was released on DVD in 2002 by Elite Entertainment. It was subsequently released on DVD by Scorpion Releasing under their Katarina's Nightmare Theater label in 2013. On October 30, 2018, Vinegar Syndrome released a region-free special edition Blu-ray of the film.

== Reception ==
=== Box office ===
Incubus was a moderate financial success at the United States box office, grossing $5.6 million.

=== Critical response ===
Vincent Canby of The New York Times wrote the film: "is a supernatural horror film about rape, a subject that the R-rated movie takes a firm stand against even as it's smacking its lips. Most of the time the incubus looks like an ordinary human being but, at the end, when it's seen for the first time as its true self, it looks like a large, shaggy, extremely mean E.T. with bad teeth." A review published by The Salinas Californian deemed it a "so-so horror film" which, "despite some confusion... is occasionally engrossing."

Ed Blank of the Pittsburgh Press criticized the film's plot and direction, but conceded the musical score as "chilling." Rick Kogan of The Journal News deemed the film "mindlessly bloody, crudely made and distasteful," concluding that it was "vile and mean-spirited." The Atlanta Constitution's Eleanor Ringel similarly noted the film's overt violence, deeming it "disturbingly nasty, [but] not so poorly done that you can completely shrug it off." She was critical of the screenplay, however, concluding that the film "tries to resolve itself in the last three minutes."

TV Guide published an unfavorable review of the film, writing: "Though potentially interesting, The Incubus suffers from a moronic script, which tosses the audience a dozen different diversions in the name of suspense. The actual result is frustration and boredom, and not even the performance of Cassavetes can save the film."

In his 1983 book The Best, Worst, and Most Unusual: Horror Films, Darrell Moore notes: "The film never really decided whether it wanted to be a satanic movie or a slasher movie or a mystery, and none of the many subplots, including one about Cassavetes accidentally killing his first wife, go anywhere." Tom Pym, writing in 1998 for the Time Out Film Guide, unfavorably assessed the film, referring to it as "a demon-rape flick of unusually high technical ineptitude, even for this egregious genre." Film scholar John Kenneth Muir called the film a "mildly effective horror film" despite its "incomprehensible plot," resulting in a film "more dull than exciting in long stretches." In the 2005 TLA Video & DVD Guide, the film was awarded one out of five stars, deemed "boring, confusing, and not very exciting."

== Sources ==
- Bleiler, David, ed. (2004). TLA Video & DVD Guide 2005: The Discerning Film Lover's Guide. New York City, New York: St. Martin's Press. ISBN 978-1-466-86782-6.
- Donahue, Suzanne Mary (1987). American Film Distribution: The Changing Marketplace. Ann Arbor, Michigan: UMI Research Press. ISBN 978-0-835-71776-2.
- Fry, Carrol (2008). Cinema of the Occult: New Age, Satanism, Wicca, and Spiritualism in Film. Madison, New Jersey: Fairleigh Dickinson University Press. ISBN 978-0-934-22395-9.
- Lerner, Loren R. (1997). Canadian Film and Video: A Bibliography and Guide to the Literature, Volume 1; Volume 7. Toronto, Ontario: University of Toronto Press. ISBN 978-0-802-02988-1.
- Moore, Darrell (1983). The Best, Worst, and Most Unusual: Horror Films. Beekman House. ISBN 978-0-881-76097-2.
- Muir, John Kenneth (2011). Horror Films of the 1980s. Vol. 1. Jefferson, North Carolina: McFarland & Company. ISBN 978-0-786-45501-0.
- Oldham, Gabriella, ed. (2016). John Cassavetes: Interviews. Conversations with Filmmakers Series. Jackson, Mississippi: University Press of Mississippi. ISBN 978-1-496-80672-7.
- Pym, John (1998). Time Out Film Guide (7th ed.). New York City, New York: Penguin. ISBN 978-0-140-27525-4.
