= Maurice Colbourne =

Maurice Colbourne may refer to:

- Maurice Colbourne (actor born 1894) (1894–1965), British actor, producer and playwright
- Maurice Colbourne (actor born 1939) (1939–1989), British actor, born Roger Middleton
