= Ray Russell (writer) =

American author (1924–1999)

- Born: September 4, 1924; Chicago, Illinois, U.S.
- Died: March 15, 1999 (aged 74); Los Angeles, California, U.S.
- Occupations: Novelist; screenwriter
- Spouse: Ada Szczepanski
- Children: 2
- Writing career
- Genre: Horror

Ray Russell (September 4, 1924 – March 15, 1999) was an American editor and writer of short stories, novels, and screenplays. Russell is best known for his horror fiction, although he also wrote mystery and science fiction stories.

His most famous short fiction is "Sardonicus", which appeared in the January 1961 issue of Playboy magazine, and was subsequently adapted by Russell into a screenplay for William Castle's film version, titled Mr. Sardonicus. American writer Stephen King called "Sardonicus" "perhaps the finest example of the modern gothic ever written". "Sardonicus" was part of a trio of stories with "Sanguinarius" and "Sagittarius".

== Early life ==
Born in Chicago, Russell served in the U.S. Air Force in the South Pacific from 1943 to 1946, after which he studied at the Chicago Conservatory of Music and the Goodman Memorial Institute. Prior to becoming a writer, Russell worked for the United States Treasury.

== Writing career ==
Russell's first novel was The Case Against Satan (1962), about a young girl possessed by a demon. It was published almost a decade before a more famous novel with a similar plot, The Exorcist by William Peter Blatty. Darrell Schweitzer described The Case Against Satan as "a Catholic Turn of the Screw" and said the novel "succeeded brilliantly" in making the concept of the Devil frightening to modern readers.

In the 1950s, Russell began working for Playboy magazine as a fiction editor. In this capacity Russell published a large amount of science fiction, fantasy and horror in the magazine; Russell also encouraged and promoted the fiction of Charles Beaumont. He also contributed to The Paris Review.

In 1961, Russell wrote his first screenplay, Mr. Sardonicus—based on his own short story—for director William Castle. He would write several other screenplays over the next five years, including Zotz! (1962), also for Castle. For Roger Corman he wrote the screenplays for The Premature Burial (1962) and X (1963)—the former of which was based on the Edgar Allan Poe short story. In 1976, he published Incubus, a horror novel about a creature raping and murdering young women in a small town. He would adapt the novel for the 1982 film of the same name, directed by John Hough and starring John Cassavetes.

== Death ==
Russell died of complications resulting from a stroke at a nursing home in Los Angeles, California, on March 15, 1999. He was survived by his wife, Ada Szczepanski, and their two children.

== Accolades ==
In 1991 Russell received the World Fantasy Award for Lifetime Achievement and in 1992 he was presented the Bram Stoker Award for Lifetime Achievement.

== Bibliography ==
=== Books ===
- Sardonicus and Other Stories (1961)
- The Case Against Satan (1962)
- Unholy Trinity (1964)
- The Little Lexicon of Love (1966)
- The Colony (1969)
- Sagittarius (Playboy Science Fiction/Fantasy, 1971)
- Prince of Darkness (1971)
- Incubus (1976)
- Holy Horatio! (1976)
- Princess Pamela (1979)
- The Devil's Mirror (1980)
- The Book of Hell (1980)
- The Bishop's Daughter (1981)
- Haunted Castles: The Complete Gothic Tales of Ray Russell (1985)
- Absolute Power (1992)

=== Short stories ===
- "Sardonicus"
- "Sagittarius"
- "Sanguinarius"
- "Comet Wine"
- "The Runaway Lovers"
- "The Vendetta"
- "The Cage"
- "The Actor"
- "The Exploits of Argo"
- "The Sword of Laertes"
- "Montage"
- "Booked Solid"
- "Take A Deep Breath"
- "The Pleasure Was Ours"
- "The Room"
- "I Am Returning"
- "Incommunicado"
- "His Father's House"
- "Last Will And Testament"
- "The Rosebud"
- "London Calling"
- "Ounce of Prevention"
- "Xong of Xuxan"
- "Space Opera"
- "The Collapse of Civilization"

=== Poetry ===
- The Night Sound (1987)

=== Screenplays ===
- Mr. Sardonicus (1961) (adapted from his novella)
- The Premature Burial (1962)
- Zotz! (1962)
- The Horror of It All (1963)
- X (1963)
- Chamber of Horrors (1966) (story only)
- The Incubus (1982) (adapted from his novel)
