= Nurse on Wheels =

- UK theatrical poster
- Directed by: Gerald Thomas
- Written by: John Burke (novel); Norman Hudis
- Produced by: Peter Rogers; Frank Bevis
- Starring: Juliet Mills; Ronald Lewis; Joan Sims; Noel Purcell
- Cinematography: Alan Hume
- Edited by: Archie Ludski
- Music by: Eric Rogers
- Production company: Peter Rogers Productions
- Distributed by: Anglo-Amalgamated Film Distributors
- Release date: January 1963
- Running time: 85 minutes
- Country: United Kingdom
- Language: English

Nurse on Wheels is a 1963 British comedy film directed by Gerald Thomas, and starring Juliet Mills, Ronald Lewis, and Joan Sims. The screenplay was by Norman Hudis based on the novel Nurse is my Neighbour by Joanna Jones, a pseudonym of John Burke.

== Story ==
Nurse Joanna Jones passes her driving test (after one hundred and six lessons) and successfully applies for a job as District Nurse. She settles into a cottage with her mother, and goes about her work with quiet confidence. But she finds that the patients are used to, and prefer, an older nurse, like Nurse Merrick, who has recently retired. Joanna despairs of winning the confidence of her patients, but is then visited by Nurse Merrick who tells her that it was the same when she arrived many years before. Boosted by this, Joanna soon wins the support of the populace.

She also meets Henry Edwards, a rich but very short-tempered farmer. Her mother hopes that Joanna will fall in love with Dr Golfrey, who Joanna works with, but in fact it is Edwards who shows more interest in her. When a young couple, Ann and Tim Taylor, park their caravan in one of the fields owned by Edwards, the population rally around a heavily pregnant Mrs Taylor. Edwards tries to evict them, but Joanna has taken charge of the delivery, and won't allow it.

All works out in the end. Dr Golfrey offers the vacant receptionist's job to Deborah, daughter of the local vicar (who is smitten with him anyway). Joanna becomes engaged to Edwards, who promises to curb his temper. And Mr Taylor is offered a job as gardener at the vicarage.

== Cast ==
- Juliet Mills as Joanna Jones
- Ronald Lewis as Henry Edwards
- Joan Sims as Deborah Walcott
- Noel Purcell as Abel Worthy
- Esma Cannon as Mrs. Jones
- Raymond Huntley as vicar
- Athene Seyler as Miss Farthingale
- Norman Rossington as George Judd
- Ronald Howard as Dr. Harold Golfrey
- Joan Hickson as Mrs. Wood
- Renée Houston as Mrs. Beacon
- Jim Dale as Tim Taylor
- George Woodbridge as Mr. Beacon
- David Horne as Dr. Golfrey Senior
- Deryck Guyler as driving examiner
- Barbara Everest as Nurse Merrick
- Brian Rawlinson as policeman
- Amanda Reiss as Ann Taylor

== Production ==
The action was filmed at Pinewood Studios, and on location in Little Missenden, Buckinghamshire.

It was one of two comedies Lewis made for Thomas.

== Critical response ==
Monthly Film Bulletin said "This latest Peter Rogers comedy of the rural adventures of a District Nurse mixes a familiar style of comedy with sentiment and basically credible situations, so that the overall tone is warm: the bulk of the comedy is saved for the final stages. Character study dominates, and a glance at the cast list shows that this is in capable, experienced hands. Village and rural settings lend a welcome breath of fresh air to the proceedings."

Variety said "Lacklustre offspring of the "Carry On" cycle. ... There are some fine comedy performances in this featherweight exercise, but only in widely scattered instances are the players helped along much by the Norman Hudis screenplay from Joanna Jones' novel "Nurse Is a Neighbour." Yarn has to do with the experiences encountered by a newly-assigned young district nurse (Juliet Mills) in a rural community populated by the most accident-prone individuals ever to hit the screen-outside of a Tom & Jerry cartoon."

Boxoffice said: "There's romance, humor and not a little misunderstanding, and gratifyingly enough, the shade-under-90 minutes running time doesn't permit any dawdling along the way. The premise is put forth promisingly, enacted vigorously, summed up entertainingly, and the small-town setting is a refreshing change-of-pace from the previous "Carry On" atmosphere."

The Radio Times Guide to Films gave the film 3/5 stars, writing: "Peter Rogers and his wife Betty Box seem to have had an obsession with medical matters. She produced the popular Doctor series, while he was responsible for four hospital-based Carry Ons and this charming comedy that reunited him with Juliet Mills, who had played a nurse in the previous year's Twice round the Daffodils. It has its moments of broad humour, but old-fashioned family fun is to the fore as district nurse Mills encounters a range of eccentrics in a village."

Leslie Halliwell said: "Part sentimental, part Carry On; watchable as its curious kind."
