= Incubus (Russell novel) =

1976 novel by Ray Russell

- First edition cover art
- Author: Ray Russell
- Language: English
- Genre: Horror
- Publisher: William Morrow and Company
- Publication date: January 6, 1976
- Publication place: United States
- Media type: Print (Hardcover)
- Pages: 286
- ISBN: 978-0-688-02981-4
- OCLC: 1551571
- LC Class: PZ4.R9663 In

Incubus is a supernatural horror novel by American writer Ray Russell, first published by William Morrow and Company in 1976. Its plot follows a small California community that is plagued by a series of brutal rapes and murders that are discovered to be supernatural in origin.

It is the basis of the 1981 film of the same name directed by John Hough and starring John Cassavetes.

== Publication ==
William Morrow and Company first published Incubus on January 6, 1976. It was re-printed by Dell Books in 1977 in paperback format, with later subsequent reprinting through 1981. Dell also published a paperback edition under the title The Incubus featuring the film adaptation's American poster artwork (in the United States, the film was released under this slightly extended title).

== Analysis ==
Will Errickson, writing about the novel for Reactor magazine in 2014, commented on its implicit sexual politics and explicit sexual themes, noting:

The sexual politics, if you will, of Incubus are a real window into the past. Sometimes I couldn’t tell if Russell was satirizing traditional sex roles or, like Playboy felt it was doing back in the day, embracing a newfound freedom with open fervor and celebrating a healthy lust for, uh, life in both men and women. Was Russell being sexy or sexist? Throughout the novel are moments in which it becomes clear that Russell had spent formative years as Playboy's fiction editor: there’s an open-minded attitude about sexual relations between consenting adults; the older generation thinks something as common as a blow job is filthy, vile, and depraved; women are depicted as having a sex drive comparable to men and are able to express it on their own terms. Science and rationality are the tools of the day, even when dealing with old world monsters.

== Adaptations ==
Filmmaker John Hough directed a 1981 film of the same name, based on a screenplay by Sandor Stern and starring John Cassavetes.
