= The Angel (2007 film) =

2007 short film directed by Paul Hough

The Angel is a 2007 short sci-fi martial arts horror film directed by Paul Hough starring Eddie McGee, Celine Tien and Thomy Kessler. It was inspired by Eddie McGee, a disabled actor who was trained in wire-work. The short film received multiple film festival awards.

== Awards ==
- Best Film at London Sci-Fi Film Festival Sci-fi-london,
- Best Film at Newport Beach Film Festival
- Best Film at Show Off Your Shorts Film Festival
- Audience Award at Fantasia Film Festival,
- Best Film at Long Island Film Festival
- Best Film at California Film Festival,
- 10 Degrees Hotter Award at The Valley Film Festival

== Other screenings ==
- The USA Film Festival, Kansas City Jubilee, Waterfront Film Festival, NYC Downtown Shorts, StoneyBrook, Del Rey Beach, Fangoria's *Weekend Of Horrors,
- The Florida Film Festival,
- The Atlanta Film Festival,
- The Silver Lake Film Festival,
- The Denver International Film Festival,
- The Gen Art Film Festival,
- The Nashville Film Festival,
- Palm Springs International Film Festival

THE ANGEL screened on CANAL+ in France on August 10, 2008.

== Reviews ==
- Filmthreat.com
