= John Hough (director) =

British film and TV director (born 1941)

- Born: 21 November 1941 (age 84); London, England
- Occupations: Film and television director, screenwriter, producer

John Hough (/hɔːf/, born 21 November 1941) is a retired English film and television director, producer, and screenwriter. He is primarily known for his horror and suspense films of the 1970s and 1980s, including Twins of Evil (1971), The Legend of Hell House (1973), The Incubus (1982) and American Gothic (1988), as well as the 1974 action thriller Dirty Mary, Crazy Larry and the Walt Disney Studios productions Escape to Witch Mountain (1975) and Return from Witch Mountain (1978). FilmInk characterized him as an "unsung auteur."

== Career ==
=== British TV ===
After many credits as a second unit director on The Baron, The Avengers and The Champions, Hough took his first job as a director on the 1968 season of The Avengers, directing episodes such as "Super Secret Cypher Snatch" and "Homicide and Old Lace".

"ITC was a very special place to work in", he said later. "And the people cared. Instead of asking you to do it quicker and with less quality, they'd push you to excel yourself. It was creative and interesting, but very disciplined. It was like Michelangelo painting the Sistine Chapel on a nine-to-five contract."

=== British films ===
Hough's TV work led to a TV pilot for a proposed Robin Hood TV show, Wolfshead: The Legend of Robin Hood in 1969. Even though the series never materialised, the pilot was picked up by Hammer Films, which distributed it theatrically.

"That one sank without trace", Hough recalled in the notes for his biography on the DVD of his 1980 film The Watcher in the Woods, "but in 1970 a Hollywood producer named Paul Maslanksy came over here looking for a new director to work on a remake of The Window (1949), in which a young boy is the sole witness to a murder and is then tracked down by the assassin."

The film Eyewitness (1970) was well received; Hammer then approached him to make the final film in its erotic vampire horror 'Karnstein' trilogy, Twins of Evil (1971).

=== Hollywood career ===
Hough moved to Hollywood with the intention of making inroads to direct for Disney. While doing so, a new production company, Academy Pictures Corporation (started by former American International Pictures partner, James H. Nicholson), hired Hough to direct the low-budget action picture Dirty Mary, Crazy Larry. The film was very successful in the summer of 1974, and helped open the doors to Disney, where Hough directed Escape to Witch Mountain which was successful and Watcher In The Woods.

=== Return to Britain ===
Hough later directed three of the TV movies in the 1984 anthology series Hammer House of Mystery and Suspense.

He directed a series of films based on Barbara Cartland novels starting with A Hazard of Hearts.

He also directed Something to Believe In (1998) for Lew Grade.

== Personal life ==
Hough's son, Paul, is also a film director.

== Filmography ==
=== Film ===
Year	Title	Functioned as		
Year	Title	Director	Writer	Producer
1969	Wolfshead: The Legend of Robin Hood	Yes	No	No
1970	Eyewitness	Yes	No	No
1971	Twins of Evil	Yes	No	No
1972	Treasure Island	Yes	No	No
1973	The Legend of Hell House	Yes	No	No
1974	Dirty Mary, Crazy Larry	Yes	No	No
1975	Escape to Witch Mountain	Yes	No	No
1978	Brass Target	Yes	No	No
1978	Return from Witch Mountain	Yes	No	No
1980	The Watcher in the Woods	Yes	No	No
1981	Incubus	Yes	No	No
1983	Triumphs of a Man Called Horse	Yes	No	No
1986	Biggles	Yes	No	No
1988	Howling IV: The Original Nightmare	Yes	No	No
1988	American Gothic	Yes	Yes	No
1998	Something to Believe In	Yes	Yes	Yes
2001	Bad Karma	Yes	No	No

=== Executive producer only ===
- What's a Carry On? (1998)
- Mr. Thunderbird: The Gerry Anderson Story (2000)
- The Backyard (2002)
- The Human Race (2013)

=== Television ===
Year	Title	Functioned as				Notes
Year	Title	Director	Writer	Producer	Other	Notes
1966–67	The Baron	No	No	No	Yes	2nd unit director; 29 episodes
1968–69	The Avengers	Yes	No	No	Yes	Director; 4 episodes 2nd unit director; 29 episodes
1968–69	The Champions	No	No	No	Yes	2nd unit director; 15 episodes
1972–74	The Protectors	Yes	No	No	No	5 episodes
1974	The Zoo Gang	Yes	No	No	No	3 episodes
1976	The New Avengers	Yes	No	No	No	Episode: "Cat Amongst the Pigeons"
1984	Omnibus	No	No	Yes	No	Episode: "Joan Littlewood's Lovely War"
1984	Hammer House of Mystery and Suspense	Yes	No	Associate	No	3 episodes
1986	Dempsey and Makepeace	Yes	No	No	No	Episode: "Extreme Prejudice"

=== TV movies and miniseries ===
Year	Title	Functioned as		
Year	Title	Director	Writer	Producer
1985	Black Arrow	Yes	No	No
1987	A Hazard of Hearts	Yes	No	Yes
1989	The Lady and the Highwayman	Yes	No	Yes
1990	A Ghost in Monte Carlo	Yes	No	Yes
1991	Duel of Hearts	Yes	No	Yes

== Unmade projects ==
- The Fan Club (1974) – for Lawrence Gordon at Columbia Pictures based on novel by Irwin Wallace.
- Poe – about Edgar Allan Poe (1976)
