= Sardonicism =

Expressions of humor used during adversity: cynicism, derision, skepticism

Sardonicism is form of wit or humour with a degree of cynicism or disdainfulness. It is more biting and negative than sarcasm, yet not entirely malicious. A sardonic person might participate in funny yet scornful mocking, or express uncomfortable truth in a clever way. The style of expression can be both spoken and written, and is featured in a literary genre.

== Origin ==
Both the concept and the etymology of the root word "sardonic" are of uncertain origin, but appear to stem from the Mediterranean island of Sardinia. The 10th-century Byzantine Greek encyclopedia Suda traces the word's earliest roots to the notion of grinning (Ancient Greek: σαίρω, romanized: sairō) in the face of danger, or curling one's lips back at evil.

One explanation for the later alteration to its more familiar form and connection to laughter (supported by the Oxford English Dictionary) appears to stem from an ancient belief that ingesting the sardonion (σαρδόνιον) plant from Sardinia (Σαρδώ) would result in convulsions resembling laughter and, ultimately, death. In Theory and History of Folklore, Vladimir Propp discusses alleged examples of ritual laughter accompanying death and killing, all involving groups. These he characterized as sardonic laughter:

Among the very ancient people of Sardinia, who were called Sardi or Sardoni, it was customary to kill old people. While killing their old people, the Sardi laughed loudly. This is the origin of notorious sardonic laughter (Eugen Fehrle, 1930). In light of our findings things begin to look different. Laughter accompanies the passage from death to life; it creates life and accompanies birth. Consequently, laughter accompanying killing transforms death into a new birth, nullifies murder as such, and is an act of piety that transforms death into a new life.

A root form may first appear in Homer's Odyssey as the Ancient Greek sardánios, altered by influence of the word Sardonios (Σαρδονιος, "Sardinian"), originated from a Greek phrase which meant "to be sneered", "tearing of flesh" or for scornful laughter. From the sardónios evolved the Latin: sardonius, thence the French: sardonique, and ultimately the modern English adjectival form, sardonic. In the English vernacular, it was recorded and utilized in Edmund Spenser's The Shepheardes Calender (1579).

=== Hemlock water dropwort ===
In 2009 scientists at the University of Eastern Piedmont in Italy claimed to have identified hemlock water dropwort as the plant responsible for producing the sardonic grin. This plant is the candidate for the "sardonic herb", which was a neurotoxic plant used perhaps for the ritual killing of elderly people in pre-Roman Sardinia. When these people were unable to support themselves, they were intoxicated with this herb and then dropped from a high rock or beaten to death.

== Risus sardonicus ==
Risus sardonicus is an apparent smile on the face of those who are convulsing because of tetanus or strychnine poisoning. From the Oxford English Dictionary, "A fixed, grin-like expression resulting from spasm of facial muscles, esp. in tetanus." From a criminal poisoning handbook published in 2010:

[Convulsion of the] facial muscles may cause a characteristic expression called Risus sardonicus (from the Latin for scornful laughter) or Risus caninus (from the Latin for doglike laughter or grinning). This facial expression has also been observed among patients with tetanus. Risus sardonicus causes a patient's eyebrows to rise, eyes to bulge, and mouth to retract dramatically, resulting in what has been described as an evil-looking grin.

== See also ==
- Bittersweet
- Euphemisms
- Irony
- Rapport
- Roasting
- Sarcasm
- Schadenfreude
- Self-parody
- Evil laughter
