= Risus sardonicus =

Sustained spasm of the facial muscles

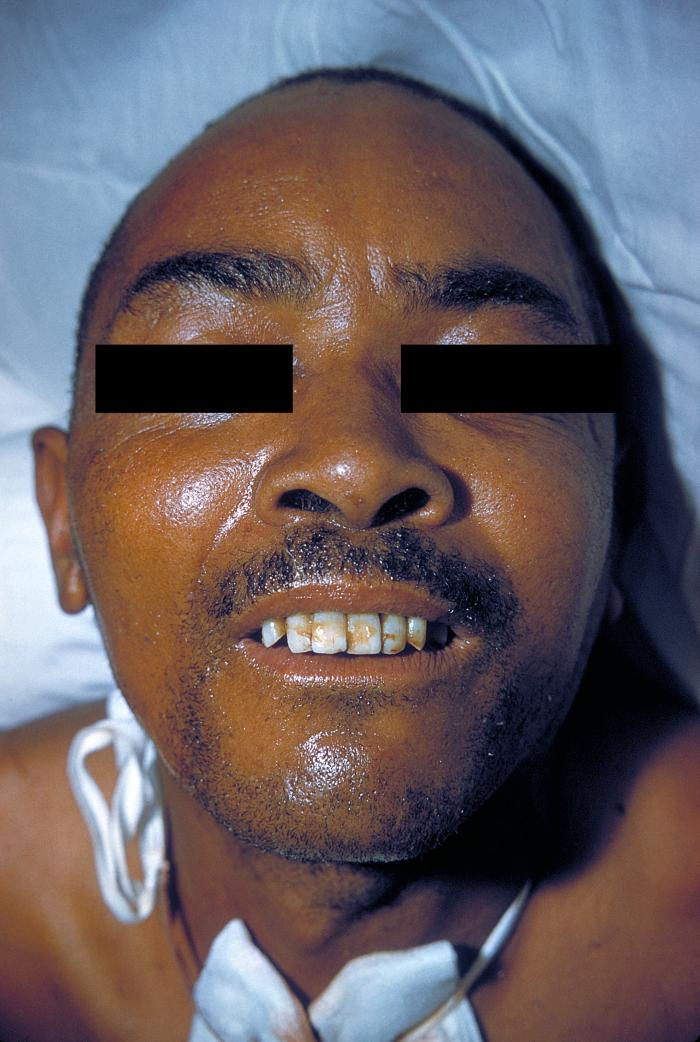
Risus sardonicus as seen in tetanus.

Risus sardonicus or rictus grin is a highly characteristic, abnormal, sustained spasm of the facial muscles that appears to produce grinning. It may be caused by tetanus, strychnine poisoning, or Wilson's disease, and has been reported after execution by hanging.

The condition's name derives from the appearance of raised eyebrows and an open "grin", which can appear sardonic or malevolent to the lay observer, displayed by those experiencing these muscle spasms.

== Causes ==
It is most often observed as a sign of tetanus. It can also be caused by poisoning with strychnine or Wilson's disease.

In 2009, scientists at the University of Eastern Piedmont wrote that they had identified hemlock water-dropwort (Oenanthe crocata) as the plant historically responsible for producing the sardonic grin. This plant is the most likely candidate for the "sardonic herb", which was a neurotoxic plant used perhaps for the ritual killing of elderly people in pre-Roman Nuragic Sardinia.

== See also ==
- Joker (character)
- Mr. Sardonicus
- Sardonicism
- The Man Who Laughs (1928 film)
- Trismus
