= Bachelor of Hearts =

1958 British film by Wolf Rilla

- British quad poster
- Directed by: Wolf Rilla
- Written by: Leslie Bricusse; Frederic Raphael
- Produced by: Vivian Cox
- Starring: Hardy Krüger; Sylvia Syms; Ronald Lewis; Eric Barker; Miles Malleson
- Cinematography: Geoffrey Unsworth
- Edited by: Eric Boyd-Perkins
- Music by: Hubert Clifford
- Production company: Independent Artists
- Distributed by: Rank Film Distributors (UK)
- Release dates: 16 December 1958 (London, England)
- Running time: 94 mins
- Country: United Kingdom
- Language: English

Bachelor of Hearts is a 1958 British comedy film directed by Wof Rilla starring Hardy Krüger as a German who studies at Cambridge University. It was written by Leslie Bricusse and Frederic Raphael.

== Plot ==
Young German maths scholar Wolf Hauser arrives for a year at Cambridge on a student exchange programme. Settling into his rooms at the fictional University College, Wolf has more than his share of trouble negotiating English customs and manners. To make matters worse he becomes the favourite victim of the snobbish and generally unpleasant "Dodo Club". He eventually finds solace with a girlfriend, Ann.

== Cast ==
- Hardy Krüger as Wolf Hauser
- Sylvia Syms as Ann Wainwright
- Ronald Lewis as Hugo Foster
- Eric Barker as Aubrey Murdock
- Miles Malleson as Dr. Butson
- Newton Blick as Morgan
- Jeremy Burnham as Adrian Baskerville
- Peter Myers as Jeremy
- Philip Gilbert as Conrad Lewis
- Charles Kay as Tom Clark
- John Richardson as Robin
- Gillian Vaughan as Virginia
- Sandra Francis as Lois
- Barbara Steele as Fiona
- Catherine Feller as Helene
- Monica Stevenson as Vanessa
- Pamela Barreaux as Bijou
- Beatrice Varley as Mrs. Upcott
- Hugh Morton as lecturer
- Ronnie Stevens as shop assistant
- Everley Gregg as lady don
- Peter Cook as a pedestrian in the street (uncredited; Cook's film debut)

== Production ==
Leslie Bricusse and Frederic Raphael had written revues together at Cambridge University. This led to a screenwriting career which included the scripts for Charley Moon (1956) and The Big Money (1958). Raphael says their work on the latter, a rewrite, led to them being offered Bachelor of Hearts.

Raphael and Bricusse were approached by the producer Vivian Cox, who wanted them to write a film about Cambridge University similar to The Guinea Pig (1948), a play and film about a working-class boy who goes to a public school. Bricusse wrote "In our story, a clever young Cockney lad, in our imagining the still-baby-faced Richard Attenborough, gets a scholarship to Cambridge, where we follow his subsequent hope-fully hilarious adventures." Raphael said the script was "based, with all but slipshod looseness, on As You Like It."

The film was changed to become a vehicle for Hardy Kruger who had been in The One That Got Away (1957). Producer Julian Wintle, who produced that film and also worked on this, said "Kruger undoubtedly has that almost indefinable something which the public recognise and welcome as star quality. Mere good looks and ability are not enough. There has to be something plus in the personality. I should say that in Kruger's case it is his manly way of acting. The teenage girls and older ones appreciate his clean-cut manner, his air of self reliance." Kruger said, "I know it is a gamble to switch to comedy after drama. But I like to ring the changes and I think it is a good thing to surprise the public."

Raphael felt director Wolf Rilla "was a rather solemn filmmaker, not wholly suited to Leslie's and my larky screenplay ... Wolf had high ambitions as an auteur but lacked the force or luck to fulfil them".

According to Bricusse, the final film:

Appeared to be Pinewood's personal apology to Germany for our having won the war. It starred a Teutonically handsome leading German actor ... and was directed by a somewhat solemn and serious German director ... in a vaguely related but not surprisingly heavier-handed version of what we had written. Every subtle English comedic nuance was lost, and though the final film was far from being a disaster, it became what I can most charitably describe as a romantic non-comedy. Charming and talented as both Hardy and Wolf were, a comedy about U-boats rather than Cambridge might have been more appropriate – Carry On Torpedoing.

The film was originally called Light Blue then The Freshman then Bachelor of Hearts. Bricusse says this was the result of "an embarrassing ‘find a name for the movie’ competition, which provided the eventual stomach-turning title, Bachelor of Hearts."

Filming started 27 May 1958 under the title The Freshman.

Sylvia Syms was loaned out from Associated British to play the female lead. She recalled "Hardy Kruger was adorable, a very nice man. It was a most enjoyable funny film to be on, and Geoff Unsworth, the cameraman, made me look stunning too." Ronald Lewis, the second male lead, was under contract to Rank.

It was the film debut of Peter Cook, who appeared as an extra for ten shillings a day. Cook's biographer says Cook was "desperately short of cash" at the time and "can be clearly seen in one scene from the film, standing in the street alongside Christopher Booker, the future co-founder of Private Eye. Booker remembers Peter keeping the bored extras amused with a stream of jokes."

Frederick Raphael says Kruger "went on to make some quite respectable films, but this wasn't his finest hour" and that by the time he had finished the film "I was so tired of collaboration, and of the movies, that my wife and I decided to move to Spain." He later wrote "Bachelor of Hearts was not the kind of movie that I should ever have wanted to write, but it furnished me with that vital commodity, a credit, without which no film career was likely to proceed."

== Locations ==
The film's outdoor locations covered Kings Parade heavily however Cambridge railway station, Mill Lane and a panoply of colleges were used, namely: Trinity, St. John's, King's, Clare and Girton.

== Critical reception ==
The Monthly Film Bulletin wrote: "To offset its unremitting emphasis on all the more hackneyed eccentricities – real and imagined – of university life, Bachelor of Hearts has an engaging hero and heroine in Hardy Kruger and Sylvia Syms, pleasantly photographed backgrounds and a pervasive air of natural gaiety. It is a pity that the pace is often forced and the situations contrived."

The Guardian said "after a very heavy start it does come comically alive in its last two episodes."

Variety called it "facetious, rather embarrassing ... US audiences are likely to be completely bewildered."

FilmInk magazine said "the film has nice colour, location footage, Barbara Steele as an ingenue, Peter Cook as an extra and maybe one funny joke." The same magazine also noted "the public didn’t like Bachelor of Hearts much on release, but the movie always seemed to be on television back in the day."
