= Conspiracy of Hearts =

1960 British film by Ralph Thomas

- Original British cinema poster
- Directed by: Ralph Thomas
- Written by: Robert Presnell Jr.
- Based on: "original material" by "Dale Pitt" (Adrian Scott)
- Produced by: Betty E. Box executive Earl St. John
- Starring: Lilli Palmer; Sylvia Syms; Yvonne Mitchell; Ronald Lewis; Albert Lieven
- Cinematography: Ernest Steward
- Edited by: Alfred Roome
- Music by: Angelo Francesco Lavagnino
- Production company: Rank Organisation Film Productions
- Distributed by: Rank Film Distributors
- Release date: 19 February 1960
- Running time: 113 minutes
- Country: United Kingdom
- Language: English

Conspiracy of Hearts is a 1960 British Second World War film, directed by Ralph Thomas, about nuns in Italy smuggling Jewish children out of an internment camp near their convent to save them from The Holocaust. It stars Lilli Palmer, Sylvia Syms, Yvonne Mitchell and Ronald Lewis, and was nominated for a Golden Globe for Best Film Promoting International Understanding at the 18th Golden Globe Awards in 1961.

== Plot ==
In 1943 Italy, nuns hide and protect Jewish children who have escaped from a concentration camp. The Italian camp has been taken over by German forces with a colonel and his sadistic lieutenant in command. When the colonel and lieutenant threaten to execute some of the nuns, including Mother Katharine, for helping the Jewish children to escape, the Italian soldiers block the execution and shoot the Germans dead. The Italian soldiers then leave the camp to join Italian partisans in the nearby hills.

== Cast ==
- Lilli Palmer as Mother Katharine
- Sylvia Syms as Sister Mitya
- Yvonne Mitchell as Sister Gerta
- Ronald Lewis as Major Spoletti
- Albert Lieven as Colonel Horsten
- Peter Arne as Lieutenant Schmidt
- Nora Swinburne as Sister Tia
- Michael Goodliffe as Father Desmaines
- Megs Jenkins as Sister Constance
- David Kossoff as the Rabbi
- Jenny Laird as Sister Honoria
- George Coulouris as Petrelli
- Phyllis Neilson-Terry as Sister Elisaveta
- Maureen Pryor as Sister Consuela

== TV production ==
The film was originally a teleplay credited to Dale Pitt, a writer who was acting as a "front" for blacklisted Hollywood screenwriter Adrian Scott. This teleplay was set in 1946 and concerned nuns helping Jewish children to get to Palestine. It aired in 1956 as an episode of Goodyear Playhouse directed by Robert Mulligan.

== Production ==
The film version was written by Robert Presnell Jr., who set the story in 1943. Presnell was reportedly a front for Dalton Trumbo. The script was optioned by Albert C. Gannaway in 1958, but he could not get financing to make the picture.

Betty Box became enthusiastic about the movie and wanted to make it. She took it to the Rank Organisation. Box says Rank did not want them to make the movie but allowed her because of the success of the Doctor in the House series. "They said, 'It's religion, it's nuns, it's wartime, who wants to know? Tell you what, make us another Doctor and you can do it!" Box and Thomas made Doctor in Love (1960) as a pay off for Rank financing the movie.

Filminkk pointed out "all those female stars Rank had misused over the years (Kay Kendall, Diana Dors, Maureen Swanson, etc) must have looked on in bewilderment as Conspiracy of Hearts starred two actresses not even under contract to the studio, Sylvia Syms and Lili Palmer (both, it must be said, are excellent)."

The film was shot on location in Italy and at Pinewood Studios in London. Some filming took place at La Certosa di Galluzzo monastery near Florence.

Ronald Lewis had been under contract to the Rank Organisation but dropped in 1958 - however the studio hired him again for this film.

== Reception ==
The film was a financial success, being the 5th most popular film at the British box office in 1960. (Doctor in Love was even more popular.) Kinematograph called it "a very big winner."

US rights were bought by Barney Balaban of Paramount. Thomas says Balaban paid the largest amount Rank had received for a picture until then.

Filmink magazine argued it was arguably the best film from the team of Ralph Thomas and Betty Box.

== Notes ==
- Box, Betty, Lifting the Lid, 2001
