= The Premature Burial (film) =

1962 film by Roger Corman

- Theatrical release poster
- Directed by: Roger Corman
- Screenplay by: Charles Beaumont; Ray Russell
- Based on: "The Premature Burial" by Edgar Allan Poe
- Produced by: Roger Corman
- Starring: Ray Milland; Hazel Court; Richard Ney; Heather Angel
- Cinematography: Floyd Crosby
- Edited by: Ronald Sinclair
- Music by: Ronald Stein
- Color process: Pathécolor
- Production company: Santa Clara Productions
- Distributed by: American International Pictures
- Release date: March 7, 1962
- Running time: 81 minutes
- Country: United States
- Language: English
- Box office: $1 million or $1.4 million (US/Canada); 172,329 admissions (France)

The Premature Burial, also known as Premature Burial, is a 1962 American horror film directed by Roger Corman and starring Ray Milland, Hazel Court, Alan Napier, Heather Angel and Richard Ney. The screenplay by Charles Beaumont and Ray Russell is based upon the 1844 short story of the same name by Edgar Allan Poe. It was the third in the series of eight Poe-themed pictures, known informally as the "Poe Cycle", directed by Corman for American International Pictures.

== Plot ==
In the dark Victorian era, British aristocrat Guy Carrell lives with his sister Katie. He is consumed with the fear of being buried alive. His fear becomes so overwhelming that it nearly prevents him from marrying his fiancée, Emily. He tells her that he, like his father, suffers from a cataleptic disease which can make one appear to be dead. Guy then takes Emily down to the family catacomb and claims that when he was a boy, he heard his father scream from his tomb after being interred, even though his sister, Katie, insists it was all in his mind. Despite all this, Emily tells Guy that she still wants to marry him.

After the wedding ceremony, Emily plays "Molly Malone" on the piano, which sends Guy into a state of abject misery; Guy demands that Emily stop playing that music and passes out. On their wedding night, when Guy and Emily are finally alone, they hear thunder and Guy's dog howling. They go out into the garden and find him lying there, apparently killed by lightning. As they prepare to pick him up to bury him, the dog wakes up unharmed. Guy is horrified, thinking, "He wasn't dead, and I almost buried him alive." After this incident, Guy becomes even more morbid, obsessed with the idea of being buried alive.

Guy builds an elaborate burial vault equipped with several safeguards in case of his premature burial, including a poisonous elixir to be used as a last resort. This latest project causes Emily and his colleague, Miles Archer, to become concerned about his mental health.

In an effort to change his mood, Guy goes for a walk in the moors with his wife when he suddenly hears a gravedigger whistle the same Irish music "Molly Malone" that was played after his wedding. The music causes him to pass out again, and he experiences a horrific dream where he finds himself trapped inside his burial vault; however, none of his safeguards work. When he finally wakes up from his dream next to his wife, he asks her about the whistling gravedigger, but she insists that she heard no one.

Finally, Emily becomes unable to deal with Guy's behavior and tells him that either he rids himself of this obsession with death, or she will leave him forever. This ultimatum seems to work. He destroys the burial vault he constructed and slowly starts to become more amenable. As a final step of his treatment, Miles suggests that Guy open his father's tomb to prove that he was never buried alive. But when he does, it causes him to go into another cataleptic state, and this time, he is unable to wake.

After an examination by Emily's father, he is declared dead. Guy's family concludes he suffered a heart attack, and upon Emily's request, he is buried in the cemetery. It appears Guy's biggest fear is about to be realized when he is miraculously dug up by a pair of grave robbers just as he regains his mobility. Now in a state of madness, Guy returns to his home to seek revenge on those who conspired for his demise.

Guy promptly kills Emily’s father in the laboratory by electrocuting him. While this is occurring, Emily tells Miles she has feelings for him and that she made a mistake marrying Guy. A servant comes to retrieve Miles after finding Emily’s father's body. Guy goes to Emily’s room, where the sight of him causes her to faint. Guy takes her to the graveyard, places her into his burial plot, and covers her with dirt. Miles approaches and begs for Guy to stop, and a fight ensues. Guy is stopped by Katie, who shoots him dead on the spot.

Miles retrieves Emily from the grave only to find that she has died. Katie shows Miles that Emily had the key to Guy's crypt. Katie reveals that once Emily discovered Guy's fear of being buried alive, she worked hard to have him meet his end. Emily hired grave robbers to torment him, only to pretend not to hear or see them when Guy questioned himself. Emily also hid a cat in the walls of their home and had Guy’s father's tomb desecrated, all to make Guy’s fears grow. Katie, crying, confesses to Guy’s corpse that she knew what Emily was up to but that she did not have enough proof and needed to wait, only to have waited too long. Katie and Miles exit the graveyard as the camera pans over to a grave that says “Rest in Peace.”

== Cast ==
- Ray Milland as Guy Carrell
- Heather Angel as Kate Carrell, Guy's Sister
- Hazel Court as Emily Gault, Guy's Wife
- Alan Napier as Dr. Gideon Gault
- Richard Ney as Miles Archer
- John Dierkes as Sweeney
- Dick Miller as "Mole"
- Clive Halliday as Judson
- Brendan Dillon as Clergyman

== Production ==
Roger Corman had made two successful adaptations of Edgar Allan Poe's (1809–1849) works for American International Pictures (AIP) starring Vincent Price.

He decided to make his own Poe film with financing through Pathé Lab, a company that did the print work for AIP and had backed a few of their productions as well. Corman wanted to use Price, but AIP had him under exclusive contract, so he cast instead Ray Milland. On the first day of shooting James H. Nicholson and Sam Arkoff of AIP turned up, announcing to Corman that they were working together again, as they were able to convince Pathé to bring the movie back to AIP after threatening to pull all future lab work with them.

Corman employed Francis Ford Coppola on Burial as an assistant director.

== Reception ==
Contemporary reviews for Premature Burial were less favorable than those for Corman's previous two Poe adaptations. Howard Thompson of The New York Times praised the "handsomely tinted Gothic settings" and "compelling music", but found the film "static, slack and starchily written." Variety wrote that Corman "seems to have run thin in imagination on this third trip to the same literary well. Not only is the plotting in 'Premature Burial' discouragingly predictable, but its gloomy and cavernous interior setting is peculiarly similar to those in the first two pix." John L. Scott of the Los Angeles Times agreed that the film was "gloomily predictable" and suggested that American International "may be running a good thing into the ground." The Monthly Film Bulletin wrote that "there are some sequences well worth watching, notably Guy's hallucinatory vision of being buried alive", but found that the "outlandish horror" of the original story "is never really caught, and Corman obtains most of his effects from rude shock-cuts rather than from intelligent exploitation of the situations and settings."

Cavett Binion of AllMovie notes, "Milland's performance conveys the requisite amount of hand-wringing torment (in the mode of "The Lost Weekend" movie), even if he fails to capture the manic intensity that Price brought to the other Poe films that he played or starred in. Corman's deft direction, employing a rich palette of colours and superb widescreen compositions, is on a par with the series' finest installments."

On Rotten Tomatoes the film has an approval rating of 56% based on reviews from 9 critics.

=== Box office ===
According to Kinematograph Weekly the film was considered a "money maker" at the British box office in 1962.

== Accolades ==
The film won a 1962 "Golden Laurel" – "Sleeper of the Year" Award.

== See also ==
- List of American films of 1962
- Edgar Allan Poe in television and film
