= Big Boy Now! =

- Genre: Sitcom
- Written by: Ronnie Taylor
- Directed by: Les Chatfield
- Starring: Leslie Crowther; Fabia Drake; Derek Farr; Ronald Lewis; Bernard Horsfall
- Country of origin: United Kingdom
- Original language: English
- No. of series: 2
- No. of episodes: 14

Production
- Running time: 25 minutes
- Production company: ATV

Original release
- Network: ITV
- Release: 30 May 1976 – 31 March 1977

Big Boy Now! is a British television sitcom. It starred Leslie Crowther and Fabia Drake, and was produced by ATV. All 14 episodes of the programme were missing and believed lost. However, in April 2017, three episodes—comprising the first episode of the first series and the final two episodes of the second—were discovered on "2" videotape at the BFI National Archive.
