= The Face of Love (1954 film) =

1954 television film by Alvin Rakoff

- Written by: Ian Dallas
- Directed by: Alvin Rakoff
- Starring: Laurence Payne; Mary Morris; John Breslin
- Country of origin: United Kingdom
- Original language: English

Production
- Production company: BBC

Original release
- Release: 1954

The Face of Love is a 1954 BBC television film produced and directed by Alvin Rakoff, and adapted from Troilus and Cressida as a modern-language and modern-dress drama by Ian Dallas, a RADA graduate later better known as a scholar of sufism. This was only Dallas' second play, but won him a contract with BBC, where he stayed till the mid-60s. The 90-minute drama was broadcast on October 5.

The TV film starred Laurence Payne as Troilus, Mary Morris as Cressida, along with John Breslin as Aeneas, Janet Butler as Philomena, John Charlesworth as Aidos, Maurice Colbourne as the Trojan statesman Pandarus, George Rose as Philo, a Trojan sergeant. Ronald Lewis made one of his first television appearances.

The cast additionally featured Peter Cushing as Mardian Thersites. It was noted by Cushing's biographer that "Cushing's fee for The Face of Love was 74 guineas. ... There was a general increase in BBC artists' fees, but Cushing's growing standing as a film actor must have given [his agent] John Redway extra clout". The London Evening News reviewer commented "The acting of Mary Morris, Laurence Payne and Peter Cushing was among the best yet seen". Donald Pleasence also made an appearance in the role of Alex, not named in Shakespeare's original play.

A year and a half later, in February 1956, Ian Dallas' play was staged by RADA at the Vanbrugh Theatre. The principal of RADA, John Fernald, gave the lead role of Troilus to a then unknown student, Albert Finney. This was Finney's first major stage role.

== Cast ==
- Laurence Payne as Troilus
- Mary Morris as Cressida
- John Breslin as Aeneas
- Janet Butler as Philomena
- John Charlesworth as Aidos
- Maurice Colbourne as Pandarus
- Peter Cushing as Mardian Thersites
- Nuna Davey as Philo's Wife
- Brigid Lenihan as Phyllida
- Ronald Lewis as Diomedes
- Joan Miller as Helen
- Donald Pleasence as Alex
- George Rose as Philo, a Trojan Sergeant
