= Ronald Lewis (actor) =

Welsh actor (1928–1982)

- Born: 11 December 1928; Port Talbot, Glamorgan, Wales
- Died: 11 January 1982 (aged 53); Pimlico, London, England
- Occupation: Actor
- Years active: 1953–1978
- Spouse(s): Norah Gorsen; Elizabeth Marlow (1967)

Ronald Glasfryn Lewis (11 December 1928 – 7 January 1982) was a Welsh actor, best known for his appearances in British films of the 1950s and 1960s. According to one magazine, "Lewis never really became a star. However, he almost became one – indeed, he played the lead roles in several key films, some quite famous, before his life and career took a disastrous turn."

== Early life and career ==
Lewis was born in Port Talbot, Glamorgan, the son of an accountant. He moved with his family to London when he was seven. During the war he was evacuated back to south Wales, where he attended Bridgend Grammar School. There he played Bassanio in the school production of The Merchant of Venice. He decided to become an actor after seeing George Bernard Shaw's Saint Joan at the Prince of Wales Theatre in Cardiff.

Lewis attended the Royal Academy of Dramatic Art and at the end of the first year was given a scholarship for the most promising student.

=== Early roles ===
Lewis's first professional role was in Oscar Wilde's An Ideal Husband (1950) in repertory at Worthing. He was in The Square Ring at Hammersmith. He worked at Regents Park Open Air Theatre appearing in Christopher Fry's Boy with a Cart in July 1952. He was also in a play The Bad Samaritan that played in 1953.

Lewis had an uncredited bit part in Valley of Song, set in Wales. He was credited for the film version of The Square Ring (1953), for Ealing; The Beachcomber (1954), as a native islander; The Face of Love (1954) for the BBC; and Fantastic Summer (1955) for TV. He had a larger part in Helen of Troy (1955) as Aeneas and provided some romantic interest in The Prisoner (1955), with Alec Guinness.

== Rise to stardom ==
Lewis achieved attention with his stage performance in Mourning Becomes Electra by Eugene O'Neill, directed by Peter Hall (1955). This led to Alexander Korda signing Lewis to a contract with London Films in August 1955 and giving him a role in Storm Over the Nile (1956), as one of the main group of friends.

Lewis was third billed in the comedy Sailor Beware (1956), one of the ten most popular films at the British box office in 1956. He played the important role of Private Wyatt in A Hill in Korea (1956), a Korean War film. Caine described Lewis in his memoirs as "a goodlooking Welshman in the cast who I thought had the chance to become a star."

Lewis was cast opposite Vivien Leigh in the London production of Noël Coward's South Sea Bubble (1956), replacing Peter Finch at the last minute. Variety wrote he "scores as the native male charmer, using his handsome mien, flashing teeth and an attractive broken accent to spout his oddly-constructed sentences. His beach-house flirtation scene with Miss Leigh neatly done." Lewis reprised this role on British TV.

In June 1956, following the death of Alex Korda, Lewis' contract with London Films transferred to the Rank Organisation.

=== Rank ===
According to Filmink magazine, "Rank would’ve been delighted with Lewis – he fitted right into what that studio thought a film star was: handsome, tall, and muscular with Brylcreamed hair, rather like Anthony Steel." The studio tried to build Lewis into a star, giving him the lead in a thriller, The Secret Place (1957), alongside Belinda Lee, replacing Anthony Steel who had pulled out. On British TV he was in Salome (1957) and the TV series Hour of Mystery in an adaption of Night Must Fall. He appeared regularly in Armchair Theatre over fifteen years and other British anthology dramas.

Lewis had a starring role as the bad brother in Robbery Under Arms (1957) and was a villain in The Wind Cannot Read (1958). He was in Schiller's Mary Stuart and Ibsen's Ghosts on stage (which was filmed), supported Hardy Krüger in the Rank comedy Bachelor of Hearts (1958), and was in a production of Miss Julie (1959) at the Old Vic. He was Mark Anthony in a production of Julius Caesar at the Old Vic.

In October 1958 Rank did not pick up its option on Lewis's services. However he was still employed by the studio in Conspiracy of Hearts (1960), playing an Italian officer helping some nuns.

He made The Full Treatment (1960) for Hammer, directed by Val Guest. Guest called Lewis and co-star Diane Cilento "two neglected stars... and I shall go all out to un-neglect them both." Hammer kept him on for another thriller, Taste of Fear (1961), which was a big hit. So too was Mr. Sardonicus (1961) made for William Castle. This was made in Hollywood and it has been argued that in hindsight Lewis might have had a stronger career staying in the US.

Around this time Lewis appeared on television in Ghosts, Lysette, and The Fabulous Money Maker; in the latter Variety felt Lewis "acted extraordinary well in the key role." Lewis had a support role in the comedy Twice Round the Daffodils (1962) and was back in the lead for Jigsaw (1962), a thriller directed by Guest.

Lewis had a support role in Billy Budd (1962) and was the romantic lead to star Juliet Mills in the comedy Nurse on Wheels (1963), made by the Carry On team. He had the star role in two costume pictures, Siege of the Saxons (1963) and Hammer's The Brigand of Kandahar (1965).

On stage he was in Poor Bitos (1963–64).

=== Decline ===
In May 1965 Lewis appeared in court for drink driving and assault. Lewis received two black eyes, both in retaliation to his aggression: one from a man who had taken his car keys as Lewis was evidently unfit to drive; and another, at his home in Grays, from the arresting police officer whose presence was prompted by Mrs Lewis's visit to a police station in a "distressed" state. At the trial Lewis admitted driving while unfit through drink, assaulting a police officer, and being drunk and disorderly. He was fined £65 and banned from driving for a year, but he was not charged with assaulting his wife.

In December 1965 a warrant was issued for Lewis's arrest while he was appearing in Peter Pan on stage (as Hook alongside Sylvia Syms in the title role). His wife alleged he had assaulted her in August. Lewis failed to turn up at court and a warrant was issued for his arrest in December.

This possibly contributed to Lewis no longer playing lead roles in films although it has been pointed out he continued to play leads on television and in theatre until the end of his career. Another reason for the decline in his film career may have been a shift in public taste and Lewis's association with the 1950s. He focused on stage work in productions such as Raymond and Agnes (1965).

=== Final years ===
Lewis was a regular in the TV series His and Hers (1970–72). Apart from a role in Friends (1971) and its sequel Paul and Michelle (1974), his final credits were in TV: Tales of Unease (1970), Hine (1971), The Rivals of Sherlock Holmes (1973), Harriet's Back in Town (1973), Nightingale's Boys (1975), Public Eye (1975), and Crown Court ('Do Your Worst' episode, 1974), Big Boy Now! (1976), Warship (1977), The XYY Man (1977), and Z Cars (1978). Filmink noted "Like many a self-destructive drunk (Tony Hancock, Robert Newton, Judy Garland), Lewis wound up in Australia towards the end of his career, appearing in The John Sullivan Story (1979)."

He was meant to be First Voice in a production of Under Milk Wood at Theatre Gwynedd in 1975. He stopped drinking to prepare himself for the role, but wound up having a heart attack on opening night.

== Personal life ==
Lewis was married twice, both times to actresses: Norah Gorsen (m 1955) and Elizabeth Marlow (m 1967). He had two daughters with Marlow. Once the marriage broke up, he began drinking heavily. In September 1979, Lewis collapsed in his dressing room while rehearsing for a stage appearance in Sleuth.

In 1981, at the age of 52, he was declared bankrupt with debts of £21,188, equivalent to £81,682 in 2025.

=== Death ===
On 11 January 1982, Lewis took his own life by taking a barbiturate overdose at a boarding house in Pimlico. According to his brother, Lewis had been unable to find work for the past 18 months. He did not leave a note, but there were three empty bottles of aspirin and three empty bottles of whiskey so the coroner ruled suicide.

Kenneth Williams recorded in his diary entry for 12 January 1982: "The paper says Ronald Lewis has taken an overdose! He was declared bankrupt last year! Obviously nobody offered him work & he was driven to despair. I remember Ronnie... and that drinking session at the White Horse all those years ago... he was a kind boy & people used him. He was 53."

== Partial filmography ==
- Valley of Song (1953) – Morgan – Miner (uncredited)
- The Square Ring (1953) – Eddie Lloyd
- The Face of Love (1954) (TV play)
- The Beachcomber (1954) – Headman's Son
- Fantastic Summer (1955) (TV)
- The Prisoner (1955) – The Guard
- Storm Over the Nile (1955) – Peter Burroughs
- Helen of Troy (1956) – Aeneas
- Sailor Beware! (1956) – Albert Tufnell
- A Hill in Korea (1956) – The National Servicemen: Pte. Wyatt / Pte Wyatt
- The Hollow Crown (1956) (TV play)
- The Secret Place (1957) – Gerry Carter
- Ghosts (1957) (TV play)
- Robbery Under Arms (1957) – Dick Marston
- The Wind Cannot Read (1958) – Squadron Leader Fenwick
- Bachelor of Hearts (1958) – Hugo Foster
- The Grandma Bandit (1959) (TV play)
- Fifth Floor People (1960) (TV play)
- Conspiracy of Hearts (1960) – Major Spoletti
- The Full Treatment (1960) – Alan Colby
- Taste of Fear (1961) – Robert
- Mr. Sardonicus (1961) – Sir Robert Cargrave
- Twice Round the Daffodils (1962) – Bob White
- Jigsaw (1962) – Det. Sgt. Jim Wilks
- Billy Budd (1962) – Enoch Jenkins – Maintopman
- Nurse on Wheels (1963) – Henry Edwards
- Siege of the Saxons (1963) – Robert
- The Brigand of Kandahar (1965) – Case
- Out of the Unknown (1965) – Some Lapse of Time – Max Harrow
- Out of the Unknown (1966) – Lambda 1 – Benedict
- Friends (1971) – Mr. Harrison
- The Rivals of Sherlock Holmes (1973, TV Series) – Dagobert Trostler
- Paul and Michelle (1974) – Sir Robert
- Crown Court (1974–1975, TV series) – Dr. Swale / Laurence King / Alexander Gruda
- Public Eye (1975, TV series) – The Fall Guy – Julian Bradley
- Big Boy Now! (1976, TV series) – Roy Marchant
- The XYY Man (1977, TV series) – Peter Thresher
