= The Human Race (film) =

- Theatrical release poster
- Directed by: Paul Hough
- Written by: Paul Hough
- Produced by: Bryan Coyne
- Starring: Paul McCarthy-Boyington; Eddie McGee; Trista Robinson
- Cinematography: Matt Fore
- Edited by: Paul Hough
- Music by: Marinho Nobre
- Production company: Paul Hough Entertainment
- Release dates: April 11, 2013 (Brussels); June 21, 2014 (United States)
- Running time: 87 minutes
- Country: United States
- Language: English

The Human Race is an American science fiction action thriller film directed and written by Paul Hough. It stars Paul McCarthy-Boyington, Eddie McGee and Trista Robinson as a group of people who find themselves forced to race or die. A work-in-progress copy was screened at the 2012 Fantasia Film Festival and the finished copy had its world premiere on April 11, 2013 at the Brussels International Fantastic Film Festival.

== Plot ==
A diverse group of eighty strangers from Los Angeles—including Eddie, a war veteran and single-leg amputee; his military friend Justin; and Amy, a deaf woman running alongside her deaf male friend—are suddenly abducted by a blinding flash of light. They awaken in an enclosed, industrial area bounded by barricades. A disembodied voice speaks directly into their minds, introducing them to a lethal game with strict rules: if they step off the designated path, touch the grass, or are lapped twice by another runner, they will die. The broadcast concludes with the mandate: "Race or die".

Initial skepticism quickly turns to horror when several panicked contestants step onto the grass, causing their heads to instantly explode. Realizing the danger is real, the group begins sprinting along the winding path. As the physical toll increases, the frail, elderly, and very young are quickly eliminated by the strict rules of the race.

As the race progresses, a ruthless group of thugs stages a trap. They throw runners off the path to trigger the explosive rule, and they brutally murder Justin using pointed metal footpath markers. Alerted to the danger, Eddie fights back and kills the attackers. Meanwhile, the trauma of the situation escalates when Amy's deaf male friend corners her and attempts to sexually assault her. Acting in self-defense, Amy fights back, throwing him onto the grass to be executed by the game. This violent encounter permanently alters her psyche, forcing her to adopt a cold, ruthless strategy to survive.

The field thins until only Eddie and Amy are left as the final two racers. Amy, determined to be the sole survivor, ambushes Eddie and aggressively pushes him off the path onto the grass. However, because Eddie is on crutches, his body never actually touches the ground, keeping him alive. Utilizing his upper-body strength, Eddie retaliates, throws his walking stick, and kills Amy.

As the sole survivor, Eddie expects to be returned home. Instead, the environment shifts to reveal a massive extraterrestrial landscape. An alien entity presents him with a holographic display, revealing that Eddie has merely won the "first round" of a cosmic tournament. The film ends as Eddie is placed into a new starting lineup alongside victorious alien survivors from other worlds to begin the next fight. With no choice left, Eddie cracks his neck and prepares to fight.

== Synopsis ==
Eighty people are horrified to wake in a strange institutional setting, with the only common factors between them the knowledge that prior to their abductions they witnessed a sudden flash of white light, and that they were all on a certain block in Los Angeles.

The eighty are a diverse bunch from all walks of life, including young and old, athletic and disabled, two deaf people, a priest, and a pregnant woman. Each of the eighty hears her or his own voice in their heads, stating that they are all participants in a race which only one can survive. Rules: all must participate, all must stay on the paths and off the grass, and anyone who is lapped twice will die. Many die almost instantly; others are killed or forced to their deaths by other racers. As the numbers thin, counting off inside their heads, the survivors become more and more desperate to stay alive.

== Cast ==
- Paul McCarthy-Boyington as Justin
- Eddie McGee as Eddie
- Trista Robinson as Deaf Female
- T. Arthur Cottam as Deaf Male
- Brianna Lauren Jackson as Veronica
- Fred Coury as Yellow Jersey
- B. Anthony Cohen as The Priest
- Noel Britton as Stressed Out
- J. Louis Reid as War Vet
- Celine Tien as Ting
- Ian Tien as Shio Lau
- Richard Gale as Evil Brother
- Shawne Coyne as Mohawk
- Luke Y. Thompson as Orange Vest
- Jonica Patella as Homeless
- Trip Hope as Jim Phillips (as A.K. Walker)

== Reception ==
Variety wrote that "Although haphazardly assembled, Paul Hough's low-budget survival thriller is not without intrigue", while the Los Angeles Times called it an "eerie, violent sci-fi survival tale". Twitch Film commented that "while the film never quite transcends the genre in the ways that it could have, it's still an exciting, well-acted and extremely bloody slice of survivalist action with some nice surprises up its sleeve".

Review aggregator Rotten Tomatoes found that 42% of 12 critical reviews were positive, with an average rating of 2.4/10.
