= Maurice Colbourne (actor born 1894) =

British essayist (1894–1950)

As Claudio in Much Ado About Nothing with Maureen Shaw as Hero, 1922

Maurice Dale Colbourne (24 September 1894 – 22 September 1965) was an English actor, director and playwright. He was known for a long partnership with the actor Barry Jones, frequently in plays by Bernard Shaw. The two appeared numerous times in Canadian tours and on Broadway as well as in the West End. In later years he taught at the Royal Academy of Dramatic Art.

== Life and career ==
=== Early years ===
Colbourne was born near Cuddington, Eddisbury, Cheshire, the youngest of four sons of Henrietta Leonora Colbourne née Krabbe and her husband Louis Colbourne, a doctor. He was educated at Repton School and Oriel College, Oxford. During the First World War he was commissioned in the 3rd Royal Berkshire Regiment. In 1919 he was the first post-war president of the OUDS, directing Thomas Hardy's The Dynasts, a vast play with more than a hundred speaking roles.

He made his first appearance on the professional stage at the Kingsway Theatre, London, on 14 September 1920, as the Celestial Policeman in a melodrama, The Daisy. At the Royalty Theatre in November 1920 he played Lord Monkhurst in Milestones by Arnold Bennett and Edward Knoblock. From 1920 to 1923 he played juvenile lead roles with the Stratford-on-Avon Festival Company and appeared at the Kingsway in February 1922, as the Juvenile Lead in Six Characters in Search of an Author.

After playing Polixines in The Winter's Tale at the Lyric, Hammersmith in 1923 he went to the US, and made his first appearance in New York at the Garrick Theatre (for the Theatre Guild) in December 1923, as Dunois in the premiere of Bernard Shaw's Saint Joan. At the Longacre Theatre in December 1924 he played the Justice in The Mongrel; at Hampden's in 1925 he appeared as Bassanio in Walter Hampden's revival of The Merchant of Venice. In February 1926, at the same theatre, he played the Comte de Guiche in Cyrano de Bergerac.

=== Partnership with Barry Jones ===
In 1928 Colbourne joined forces with the actor Barry Jones and from 1928 to 1931 they toured Canada and the United States with a repertory mostly consisting of plays by Bernard Shaw – You Never Can Tell, John Bull's Other Island, The Philanderer, The Doctor's Dilemma, Fanny's First Play, Arms and the Man, Candida, Man and Superman, and The Apple Cart – as well as A. A. Milne's The Dover Road and Oscar Wilde's The Importance of Being Earnest.

With Jones, Colbourne returned to London in 1931, and they took over the running of the Ambassadors Theatre. In their opening production Colbourne directed and took the small role of Prince William in Robert E. Sherwood's comedy The Queen's Husband, in which they subsequently toured Canada. The critic in The Ottawa Journal commented that Colbourne "contents himself with the tiny part of the princeling but it is a beautifully clear cut and humorous piece of acting". After returning to London the two again presented the play at the New Theatre. They then went to Canada again, touring in two Shaw plays: The Apple Cart and Too True to Be Good. The partners, returning to London, took the Phoenix Theatre for a not greatly successful season comprising Women Kind – a comedy by Lewis Galantière and John Houseman – and then Shakespeare's As You Like It, with Colbourne as Orlando and Jones as Jacques, with Fabia Drake as Rosalind and Joyce Carey as Celia. Despite good notices the production did not prosper at the box office: Shakespeare was not popular with West End audiences.

In New York in 1934 the partners presented Women Kind, this time retitled as And Be My Love, which was even less successful than it had been in London, closing after four nights. They had better results in the US and Canada with Reunion in Vienna, which toured for three months in 1934. At the Lyric in October 1936 Colbourne directed and played Strafford in his own play, Charles the King, with Jones as Charles I. After nine further West End plays he toured with Jones in Canada, under the auspices of the British Council in 1939, presenting Charles the King, Shaw's Geneva, and James Bridie's Tobias and the Angel. They then played Geneva in New York in January 1940. Colbourne remained in the US until 1942 appearing with The Theatre Guild in another Sherwood play, There Shall be No Night New York and throughout the US until December 1942.

=== Later years ===
Colbourne and Jones returned to England in 1942; Colbourne embarked on a lecturing tour before serving as an acting temporary lieutenant, RNVR, from May 1943 to October 1945. In 1944 he was instrumental in starting and was a director of the London branch of the Stage Door Canteen. From 1945 he taught at the Royal Academy of Dramatic Art. He and Jones shared a house in Campden Hill, London, and subsequently on Jones's native Guernsey, where Colbourne died on 22 September 1965, aged 71. Jones outlived him by sixteen years.

== Filmography ==
=== Film ===
Year	Title	Role	Notes
1950	Seven Days to Noon	Ministry Official	uncredited
1951	The Magic Box	Bride's Father in Wedding Group	
1955	Man of the Moment	British General	uncredited
1957	Brothers in Law	Official Referee	
1959	I'm All Right Jack	Missiles Director	
1962	Life for Ruth	Vicar	

=== Television ===
Year	Title	Role	Notes
1951-1955	Sunday Night Theatre	Various characters	11 episodes
1953	Epitaph for a Spy	Major Clandon-Hartley	4 episodes
1954	Misalliance	Lord Summerhays	TV film
1954	The Face of Love	Pandarus	TV film
1956	Jesus of Nazareth	Zacharias	Episode: "The Prologue"
1956-1958	Play of the Week	Major Shales / Mr. Coade / Sir James Ferguson	3 episodes
1957	Nicholas Nickleby	Walter Bray	2 episodes
1958	Armchair Theatre	Rear Admiral Shapcott	Episode: "Wolf Pack"
1958	Saturday Playhouse	Arthur Ludgrove	Episode: "The Fourth Wall"
1959	Television Playwright	Chairman	Episode: "The Board of Management"
1960	Scotland Yard	Magistrate	Episode: "Reasonable Doubt"
1960	Billy Bunter of Greyfriars School	Doctor Locke	2 episodes
1960	Probation Officer	Doctor Barry	1 episode
1961-1962	BBC Sunday-Night Play	Robert Burgess / Alastair Moncrieff	2 episodes
1962	Studio 4	Uncle Mattia	Episode: "The Imbroglio"
1963	Ghost Squad	Sir Ian Rand-Fuller	Episode: "Sabotage"
1963	The Spread of the Eagle	Roman Senator	3 episodes

== Bibliography ==
- Unemployment or War (1928)
- The Real Bernard Shaw (1930)
- Economic Nationalism (1933)
- The Meaning of Social Credit (1934)
- America and Britain: A Mutual Introduction (1943)

== Sources ==
- Gaye, Freda, ed. (1961). Who's Who in the Theatre (thirteenth ed.). London: Sir Isaac Pitman and Sons. OCLC 3039406.
