= Taste of Fear =

1961 British film by Seth Holt

- UK film poster
- Directed by: Seth Holt
- Screenplay by: Jimmy Sangster
- Produced by: Jimmy Sangster; Michael Carreras
- Starring: Susan Strasberg; Ronald Lewis; Ann Todd; Christopher Lee
- Cinematography: Douglas Slocombe; Desmond Davis
- Edited by: Eric Boyd-Perkins
- Music by: Clifton Parker; John Hollingsworth
- Color process: Black and white
- Production company: Hammer Film Productions
- Distributed by: Columbia Pictures
- Release dates: 19 April 1961 (UK); 22 August 1961 (US)
- Running time: 90 minutes (UK); 81 minutes (US)
- Country: United Kingdom
- Language: English
- Box office: $800,000 (Europe)

Taste of Fear (U.S. title: Scream of Fear) is a 1961 British thriller film directed by Seth Holt. The film stars Susan Strasberg, Ronald Lewis, Ann Todd, and Christopher Lee in a supporting role. It was written and produced by Jimmy Sangster. Bernard Robinson was Production Designer and Stuart Lyons and Bill Constable were the Art Directors.

== Plot ==
Two men recover the body of a young woman inside a Swiss lake. Robert, the family chauffeur, transports Penny Appleby, a wheelchair-using heiress, to her estranged father's estate on the French Riviera. For the past ten years, Penny lived with her mother in Italy after her parents had divorced. When Penny arrives, she is greeted by her stepmother Jane, whom Penny has only just met. Jane informs her that the father has been called away on business. She cannot say when he will return or why he left when he was expecting Penny's arrival.

Although Jane tries to be hospitable, Penny does not trust her. Later that night, Penny sees a candle lit near her father's corpse inside the summer house. She falls inside the pool while screaming for help. After she is saved, Penny insists on returning to the summer house where the corpse is not there. Jane tries to convince Penny that her stressful travel has caused her to hallucinate. Gerrard, the family doctor, arrives and gives Penny a sedative.

The next day, Robert meets Penny privately to say he believes Penny did see something unusual, even if not a corpse. Shortly after, Penny converses with her father over the telephone. Nevertheless, Robert offers to help her investigate and later finds freshly burnt candle grease, confirming Penny's claim. Over dinner, Gerrard cites Penny's past neurotic behaviour to support his theory that she experiences hallucinations.

Penny continues to experience strange occurrences, such as hearing her father's piano playing, seeing his sports car inside the garage, and her father's corpse slumped in a chair inside her bedroom. Gerrard is invited back for dinner, where he theorises Penny's psychosis is affecting her mobility. Penny disputes this and affirms her disability, which was caused by a horse falling on her legs.

The next afternoon, Robert speculates Penny's father has been murdered, and Jane and Gerrard are trying to conceal it, but has been unable to prove it. When Jane steps out, Robert deep dives inside the pool area and locates the corpse of Penny's father lying below. On their way to the police station, Robert and Penny spot Jane along the road. Robert steps out and leaves the car in drive, where it plunges over the cliff with Penny and her father's corpse inside.

Back at the estate, Robert and Jane embrace each other, believing their plan has succeeded. During the investigation, Spratt, a police detective, disputes Jane's claim that her husband and stepdaughter drowned together. Penny had drowned herself three weeks prior in Switzerland, while staying with her friend Maggie Frenham. Jane is bewildered and returns to the estate where Maggie is there. Maggie (who has been impersonating Penny) explains that Penny's father had already known his daughter had died, and she presumed the letter asking for Penny to return home was forged. Maggie and Gerrard then worked together to expose the murder.

Now wanted for murder, Robert pushes Jane off a cliff where she falls to her death. The police follow Robert and arrest him.

== Cast ==
- Susan Strasberg as Penny Appleby
- Ronald Lewis as Robert
- Ann Todd as Jane Appleby
- Christopher Lee as Dr. Gerrard
- John Serret as Inspector Legrand
- Leonard Sachs as Spratt
- Anne Blake as Marie
- Fred Johnson as Father
- Bernard Brown as Gendarme
- Richard Klee as Plainclothes Cop

== Production ==
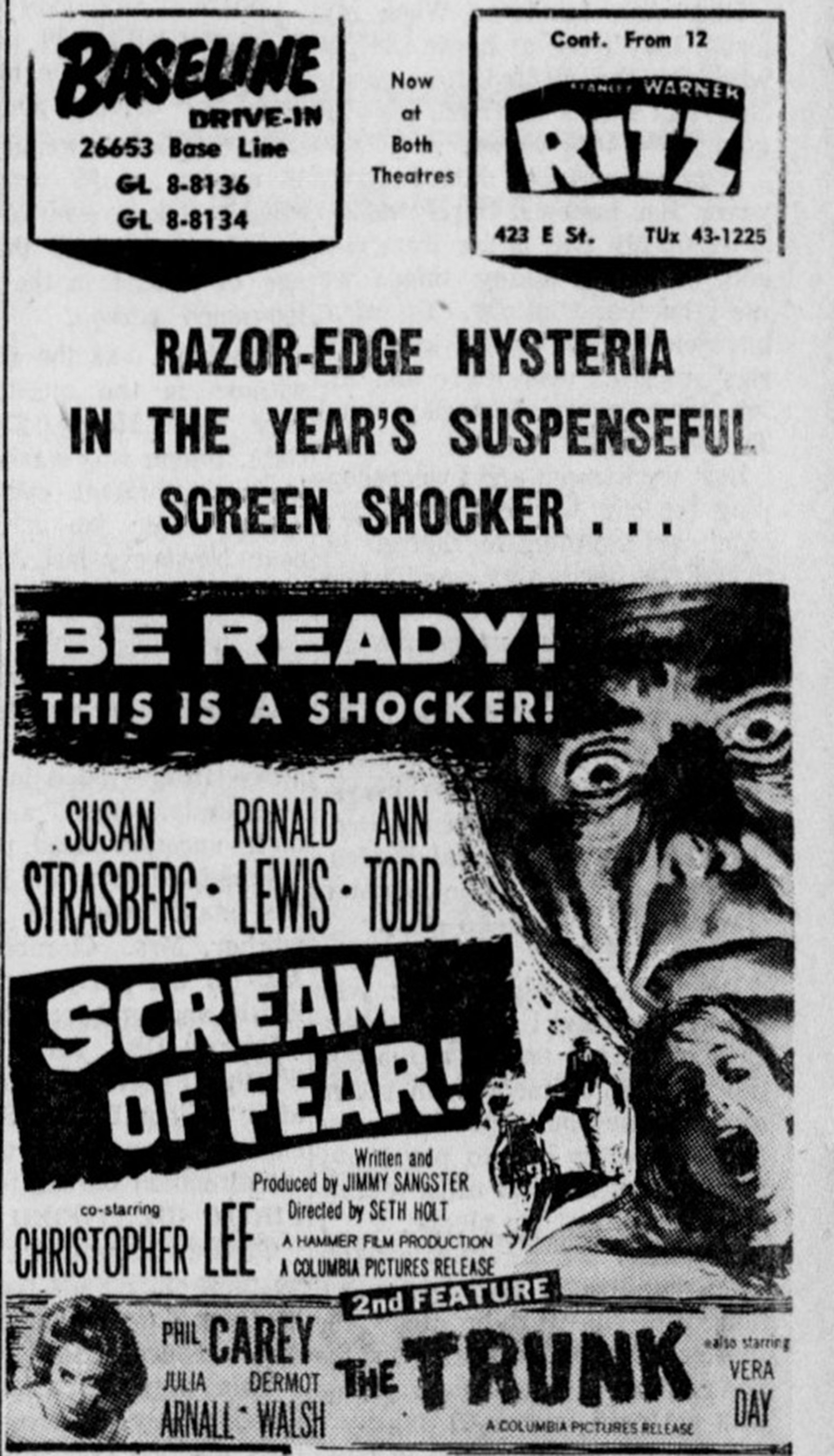
Advertisement from 1961 for Scream of Fear and co-feature, The Trunk.

Jimmy Sangster stated that he originally wrote the film for Sidney Box who assigned him to produce it. The film was going to be part of a group of films from Sydney Box Associates for Rank called See No Evil. According to Sangster, Box "had a heart attack" and stopped working temporarily, leading his projects to be taken over by his brother-in-law Peter Rogers, who was busy working on the Carry On series. Sangster then bought the film back from Peter Rogers and sold it to Michael Carreras on the condition that Sangster would be allowed to produce it. It became the first of five Hammer thrillers Sangster would make, including Maniac, Paranoiac, Nightmare and Hysteria.

Filming began at Elstree on 24 October 1960, and wrapped on December 7, 1960. Parts of the film were shot on location in France as well. It was the first film Sangster ever produced. The film was released in April, 1961 in the UK during Easter week. It became a top grosser for Columbia Pictures, and even the poster design won an award for originality. Sangster traveled personally to the US on March 15, 1961 to deliver the print to Columbia's New York office, where Michael Carreras joined him the following day.

It was the first of three films that Holt directed for Hammer and the second of three films Ronald Lewis starred in for the studio.

== Release ==
Taste of Fear was distributed in the UK on 19 April 1961, and the US on 22 August 1961, but retitled Scream of Fear for the US The film was a success in both countries and very popular in Europe, becoming one of Hammer's most profitable productions and leading to a cycle of similar psychological thrillers.

In March 2013, Sony announced plans for a remake directed by Juan Antonio Bayona, whose previous credits include the acclaimed 2007 Spanish horror film, The Orphanage.

== Reception ==
=== Box office ===
Kinematograph Weekly said the film "got comfortably by here and has done a-burster in the States."

=== Critical ===
Variety called it "contrived but expertly executed."

The Monthly Film Bulletin wrote: "Taste of Fear suggests the work of a scriptwriter dangerously overstimulated by Psycho and Les Diaboliques and determined to find even more variations to play on the theme of the peripatetic corpse. Jimmy Sangster is too deep in the Hammer tradition to achieve much finesse. ...The plot, although it twists like a cork-screw in its final sequences, is a good deal less impenetrable than its creator might like to think; and even the final images, of Ann Todd (who has played with a nice neurotic edge) smashed on the rocks, and Susan Strasberg rather smugly triumphant on the clifftop, achieve no great surprise. But, within the limitations of material which is frankly tosh, Seth Holt has done a professional job. All those creaking shutters, flickering candles, wavering shadows and pianos playing in empty rooms still yield a tiny frisson. The director has gone all out to make Taste of Fear work on its own level – and the result is no less silly than usual, but a good deal more watchable"

== Legacy ==
Christopher Lee stated that the film "was the best film that I was in that Hammer ever made... [...] It had the best director, the best cast and the best story." Ann Todd contradicted him, saying that she thought "it was a terrible film. I didn't like my part, and I found Susan Strasberg impossible to work with – all that 'Method' stuff."

== See also ==
- Hammer filmography
