= Twice Round the Daffodils =

1962 British film by Gerald Thomas

- Directed by: Gerald Thomas
- Written by: Norman Hudis; Patrick Cargill (play); Jack Beale (play)
- Produced by: Peter Rogers
- Starring: Juliet Mills; Donald Sinden; Donald Houston; Kenneth Williams
- Cinematography: Alan Hume
- Edited by: John Shirley
- Music by: Bruce Montgomery
- Production companies: Peter Rogers Productions; GWH
- Distributed by: Anglo-Amalgamated Film Distributors
- Release dates: 3 April 1962 (London); 13 April 1962 (UK)
- Running time: 89 minutes
- Country: United Kingdom
- Language: English

Twice Round the Daffodils is a 1962 British comedy film directed by Gerald Thomas and starring Juliet Mills, Donald Sinden, Donald Houston, Kenneth Williams, Ronald Lewis, Andrew Ray, Joan Sims and Jill Ireland. The film was adapted by Norman Hudis from the play Ring for Catty by Patrick Cargill and Jack Beale. Carry On Nurse (1959) was based on the same play.

The cast and production team of Twice Round the Daffodils are similar to those of the Carry On films, but the film is not an official member of the Carry On series.

== Plot ==
A new group of patients arrives at a hospital to be treated for tuberculosis; more than one takes a fancy to one or other of the attractive nurses.

The patients include John, a Welsh coal miner in a state of denial about his disease; Ian, a woman-chasing RAF officer; Bob, a man losing his girlfriend due to his lengthy stay in hospital; Henry, a supercilious bachelor with a devoted, letter-writing sister; George, a West Country farmer with hidden intelligence; and the young Chris, a timid and sensitive trainee chef who writes poetry and is bullied by John about his masculinity.

== Cast ==
- Juliet Mills as Nurse Catty
- Donald Sinden as Ian Richards
- Donald Houston as John Rhodes
- Kenneth Williams as Henry Halfpenny
- Ronald Lewis as Bob White
- Andrew Ray as Chris Walker
- Amanda Reiss as Nurse Beamish
- Renée Houston as Matron
- Joan Sims as Harriet Halfpenny
- Mary Powell as Mrs Rhodes
- Jill Ireland as Janet
- Lance Percival as George Logg
- Sheila Hancock as Dora
- Nanette Newman as Joyce

== Production ==
The film was shot at Pinewood Studios using Heatherden Hall as the sanatorium. It was one of two comedies Ronald Lewis made for Thomas.

== Critical reception ==
The Monthly Film Bulletin wrote: "Though the Carry On parentage of Peter Rogers and Gerald Thomas is amply in evidence and the lavatorial jokes generously distributed, the film is more concerned to propagate a sentimental, moist-eyed view of life in a TB ward. The inactivity enforced on the characters weighs heavily on the inventiveness of script-writer Norman Hudis and the plot is largely reduced to schoolboy practical jokes, the frustrated sex urge of Donald Sinden as a cheerful lecher and the romantic pairing-off of patients and nurses. But the moving moments are often effective and the treatment is generally so warmhearted one almost forgives the miraculously tidy ending in which all the patients are cured and discharged on the same day. The players work well together and Juliet Mills, badly miscast as a uncaring teenager in No, My Darling Daughter, matures charmingly as the efficient, selfless Catty. Given the chance and inclination, it would seem that the Rogers-Thomas team might one day achieve a really worthwhile comedy."

Variety wrote: "A shrewd amount of predictable situations are employed such as the dragon of a matron, a pretty nurse losing her skirt and a number of bedpan gags. The pic relies considerably on slick cameo performances from several proven farceurs. ... Thomas' direction and the screenplay by Norman Hudis give full scope to the cast. They are mainly stock characters. Thomas' direction is sure and Alan Hume has done a satisfactory job with his lensing."

The Radio Times Guide to Films gave the film 2/5 stars, writing: "This is a watered-down Carry On Nurse set (tastefully) in a male tuberculosis ward, with nurse Juliet Mills running the show. The Carry On producer/director team of Peter Rogers and Gerald Thomas would occasionally make these forays away from their popular series, but would invariably use a similar cast. Here's Joan Sims and Kenneth Williams again, plus Donalds Sinden and Houston, chasing nurses Jill Ireland and Nanette Newman. Followed by Nurse on Wheels."

Leslie Halliwell said: "Acceptable broadening, almost in Carry On style, of a modestly successful play."
