= Trade advertisement =

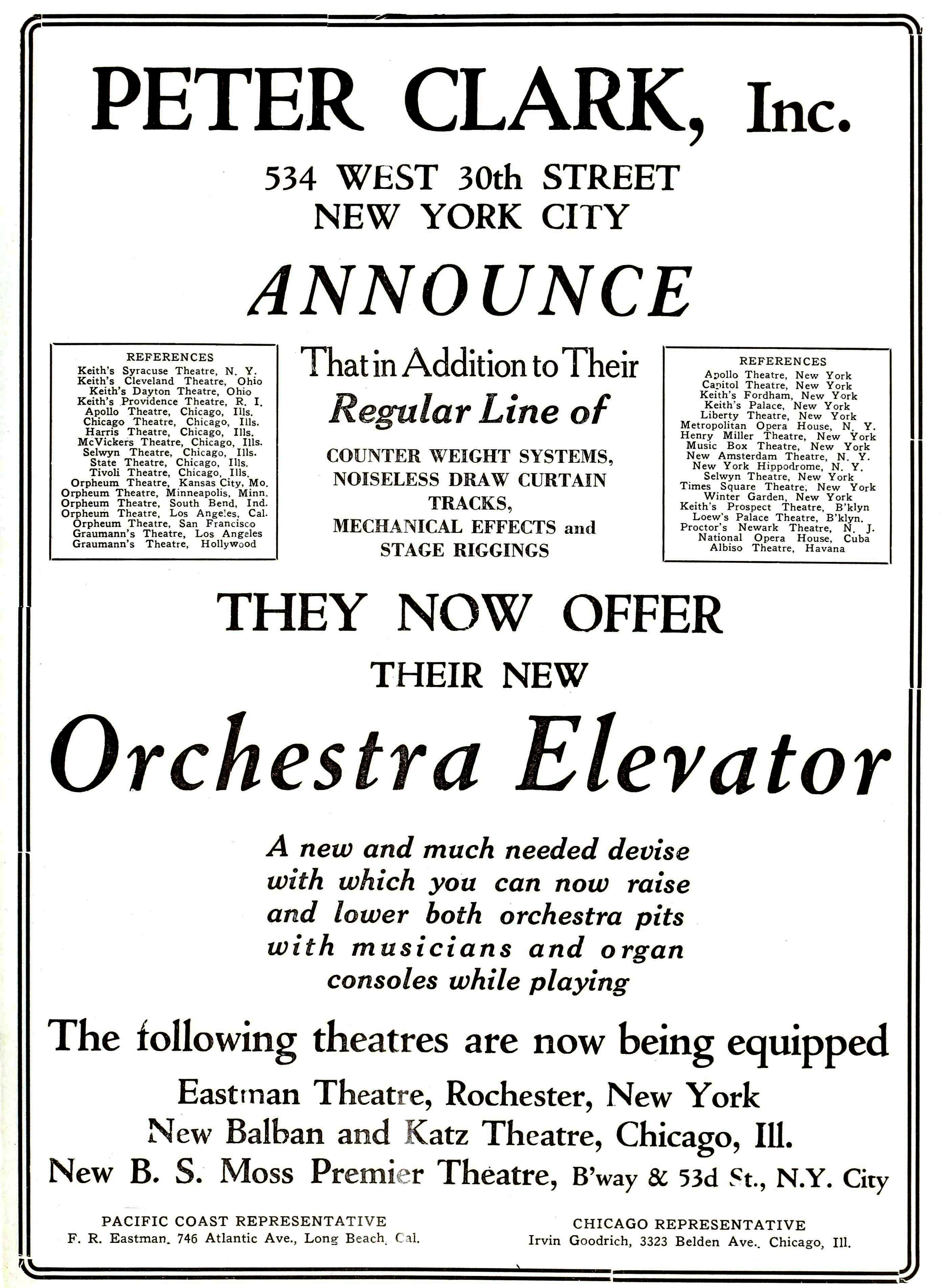
1924 trade advertisement for an elevator company

A trade advertisement is an advertising undertaken by the manufacturer and directed toward the wholesaler or retailer.

The United States Federal Trade Commission states that, "Under the law, claims in advertisements must be truthful, cannot be deceptive or unfair, and must be evidence-based."
