= The Full Treatment =

1960 British film by Val Guest

- Italian theatrical poster
- Directed by: Val Guest
- Written by: Val Guest; Ronald Scott Thorn
- Based on: The Full Treatment; 1959 novel by Ronald Scott Thorn
- Produced by: Val Guest; Victor Lyndon
- Starring: Claude Dauphin; Diane Cilento; Ronald Lewis
- Cinematography: Gilbert Taylor
- Edited by: Bill Lenny
- Music by: Stanley Black
- Color process: Black and white
- Production companies: Hammer Film Productions; Hillary-Falcon
- Distributed by: Columbia Pictures
- Release date: October 1960 (UK)
- Running time: 109 minutes (UK); 93 minutes (US)
- Country: United Kingdom
- Language: English

The Full Treatment (released in the US as Stop Me Before I Kill!) is a 1960 British horror thriller film directed by Val Guest and starring Claude Dauphin, Diane Cilento and Ronald Lewis. It is based on the 1959 novel of the same name by Ronald Scott Thorn.

== Plot ==
English racing driver Alan Colby and his wife Denise were involved in a bad accident a year ago. Although they are both physically well, Alan struggles with mood swings and is increasingly violent. The couple travel to the Côte D'Azur on vacation where they meet Dr. Prade, a psychiatrist also from London. Denise discusses her troubled marriage with Prade, which angers Alan. After a fight, the couple reconcile and return to London.

Alan attempts to strangle Denise and is immediately horrified by his dark impulses. She begs him to seek help from Prade, and he reluctantly agrees. In an early session, Prade presses Alan to reveal how he would kill Denise. Alan confesses all of the details of his fantasy, which includes strangling Denise in bed, dismembering her body and dropping the pieces down a disposal chute in their apartment building.

After many sessions, Prade concludes that Alan believed that he had killed Denise at the moment of the crash and has been reliving those feelings ever since. Alan is ecstatic when Prade declares him cured.

Alan awakens the next morning and is surprised to find Prade in his apartment. He returns a key that Denise had given him when Alan was at his most dangerous. The men realize that Denise is gone. Prade pieces together clues, all of which resemble Alan's murderous fantasy, and they fear that he has killed Denise while in a psychotic fugue state. Prade attempts to take Alan to a clinic, but they are involved in an automobile accident while on the way there. In the confusion, Alan escapes to southern France. He surreptitiously spots Denise and Prade on a yacht.

Prade has deceived Denise into taking a holiday whilst believing that Alan is under intense psychiatric care. Alan, believing that Prade and Denise have conspired against him, appears with a gun at Prade's house. Prade tells Alan that he has been in a clinic for 10 days, causing Alan to question his sanity once again. However, Denise finds an estimate for repairs to Prade's car and realizes that he slaughtered his own cat in order to stage the murder scene to deceive Alan. When she confronts Prade, he reveals his love for Denise and attempts to escape on an old gondola lift. The cable snaps and Prade is killed.

Alan and Denise are reunited, but they are solemn after their ordeal.

== Cast ==
- Claude Dauphin as David Prade
- Diane Cilento as Denise Colby
- Ronald Lewis as Alan Colby
- Françoise Rosay as Madame Prade
- Bernard Braden as Harry Stonehouse
- Katya Douglas as Connie
- Barbara Chilcott as Baroness de la Vailion
- Ann Tirard as Nicole
- Edwin Styles as Dr. Roberts
- George Merritt as Mr. Manfield

== Production ==
Val Guest said: "That was from a book by Ronald Scott Thorn, who strangely enough was our insurance doctor and put us all through the mill before, when we got our film insurances, he was the film industry's insurance doctor." Filming took place in the south of France from May to July of 1960. Val Guest would later use star Ronald Lewis again in Jigsaw.

The film was trade shown in early February 1961, and released in the UK on February 20. The British print ran 109 minutes. It was released in the U.S. on May 17, 1961, as Stop Me Before I Kill! at 93 minutes.

== Reception ==
Variety said it was "well played and directed with force".

In a contemporary review for The New York Times, critic Howard Thompson called the film "a snug, tautly-strung little thriller" and wrote: "[T]he dialogue has a nice, cutting edge, the tempo and photography are crisp and the picture seems ready to slope off in suspenseful familiarity. But not quite. After the best scene of all (a carbolic couch session, where the camera, from the patient's viewpoint, restlessly whips around the doctor's office), the story flip flops to a surprising new plane. If the ending is a bit too comfortably melodramatic and neat, most spectators should be kept guessing, along with the bewildered young hero. ... Mr. Guest's package is a small one, but trim and adroitly tied. The contents are worth waiting for."

Patrick Gibbs of The Daily Telegraph wrote: "Yes, it is a case of 'psychiatrist heal thyself,' one for the police rather than the Lancet. Only to be recommended, I'm afraid, to collectors of amiable nonsense."

The Radio Times wrote: "[A]t times the writer/director, Val Guest, seems to think he's making a Hitchcock picture but he needs more than glamorous locations for that. He also needs Cary Grant and Ingrid Bergman."

Leslie Halliwell said: "Variation on Les Diaboliques, with very little mystery and too much talk from boring characters."
