= NWF Kids Pro Wrestling: The Untold Story =

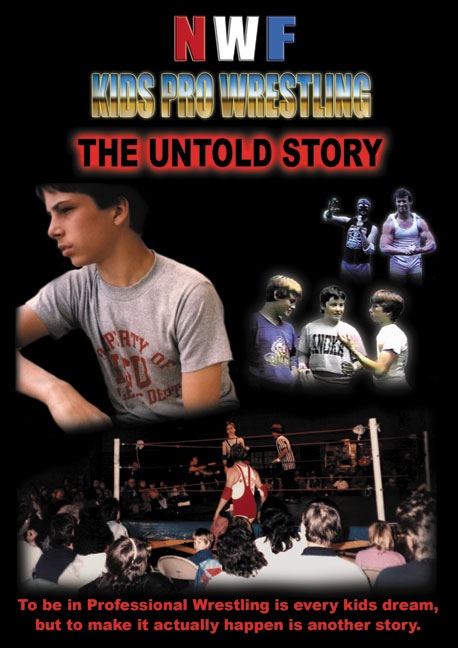
- DVD cover
- Directed by: Brian Hamm
- Written by: Brian Hamm
- Based on: Pro Wrestling Kids' Style: The Most Amazing Untold Story in Professional Wrestling History by Shawn Crossen
- Produced by: Brian Hamm
- Starring: Charley Lane; Mike Ackermann; Matt Kelsey; Jason Clauson; Chris Hanson; John Hoffman; Leslie Johnson
- Narrated by: Travis
- Cinematography: David Canada; Anthony Rodriguez
- Production company: NWF Films
- Distributed by: Ingram Entertainment; Library Video Company; Navarre Entertainment; Baker and Taylor Entertainment
- Release date: 25 October 2005 (United States)
- Running time: 84 minutes
- Country: United States
- Language: English
- Budget: $18,000

NWF Kids Pro Wrestling: The Untold Story is a professional wrestling documentary that tells the story of a youth based professional wrestling league that existed in the mid-1980s. It was released in the United States by NWF Films.

== Synopsis ==
The documentary (84 min) covers the birth and development of a professional style wrestling league from the mid-1980s that was produced by young teens aging from 12 to 16 years of age. The film covers the rise and fall of a unique wrestling experience for both the fans and kids that were involved. The film includes footage from the original NWF productions as well as current interviews with past NWF participants.

== Cast ==
Interviewed for the film were Charley Lane, Michael Ackermann, Matt Kelsey, Chris Hanson, Jason Clauson, John Hoffman, and Leslie Johnson

== Reception ==
Internet wrestling reviewer Brian Zane reviewed the documentary and called it fascinating though he found the lack of interviews with the kids parents disappointing.

== Awards and nominations ==
Since the film was released on DVD in October, 2005, It has received 13 national and international awards. Among these are:

- 2005, won Best Sports Documentary Award at New York International Independent Film & Video Festival
- 2006, won Screencraft Productions Award for Best Feature Documentary at New York International Independent Film & Video Festival
- 2006, won Aegis Award at Aegis Film and Television competition
- 2006, won Accolade Award honorable mention at Accolade Competition
- 2006, won 2 silver and 1 bronze Telly Award
