= The Backyard (2002 film) =

- Directed by: Paul Hough
- Produced by: Paul Hough
- Starring: The Lizard; Scar; Chaos; Heartless
- Edited by: Paul Hough
- Music by: Seth Jordan
- Production company: Paul Hough Entertainment
- Distributed by: Image Entertainment; HiQi Media
- Release date: 2002
- Running time: 80 minutes
- Country: United States

The Backyard is a 2002 American backyard wrestling documentary directed, produced and edited by Paul Hough and was scored by Seth Jordan. It features the appearance of Extreme Championship Wrestling alumnus and World Wrestling Entertainment professional wrestler, Rob Van Dam. Although it had a limited theatrical release in the United States in 2002, the film was later released to Germany and Australia in 2004.

== Synopsis ==
This documentary reveals the violent, bizarre depths of the world of backyard wrestling to the mainstream. Director Paul Hough was working on a syndicated wrestling program when an audition tape led him to discover the widespread phenomenon online. Males of different ages who cannot afford pro wrestling school tuition or choose to make their activities a lifestyle, turn to compete in the unsanctioned battleground of their backyard, with the use of deadly elements and weapons, such as barbed wire, light tubes, fire, glass and staple guns. The film showcases Hough's tour, as he tracks several underground wrestlers in Arizona, Nevada, California, New York and England.

== Cast ==
Most members of the cast go by their wrestling alias. The cast includes:

- Tom Flynn
- The Lizard
- Chaos
- Scar
- "Vince McMahon of Backyard Wrestling" Joshua James
- Heartless
- The Retarded Butcher
- Sic
- Phil Snyder
- Lincoln Steen
- Ryan Downes
- Chris King
- Marc Narburgh
- Mike Turbeville
- Adam Mikels
- Mike Damage
- Fooker Freer
- PeeWee
- Sammy Swift

== Awards ==
- Best Picture at Silver Lake Film Festival
- Audience Award at Brooklyn International Film Festival
- Best Lounge Film at Sonoma Valley Film Festival
- Critic's Choice at Edinburgh International Film Festival
- Director's Choice Award at Texas Film Festival
- DVD of the Month by Maxim Magazine

== Distribution ==
The film was released in select theaters in Germany and had a limited theatrical run in the United States. It was released on DVD and PSP, also later airing on television in the United Kingdom and the Netherlands.

== Reception ==
The Backyard holds a 74% fresh rating on Rotten Tomatoes based on 14 reviews, equating to an average rating of 6.6 out of 10. Overall, it was met primarily with positive reviews. Dave Kehr, a writer for The New York Times, called it an "astounding anthropological study of that strange tribe known as the American teenager", and finished by claiming it is "strange" and "disturbing." John Petrakis of The Chicago Tribune labelled it a "first-rate documentary." Charles Martin chipped in for Film Threat, viewing the film as "a fascinating emotional rollercoaster", and that it "approaches the subject with genuine curiosity." Contributing his thoughts, Michael O'Sullivan of The Washington Post believes it's not for the squeamish, but that its "bone-crunching message is worth hearing."
