= Paul Hough =

English film director

Paul Hough is an English film director. He is best known for creating and directing the 2002 documentary The Backyard. He is the son of director John Hough.

In 2007 he directed the short film The Angel. In 2012, Hough directed the thriller The Human Race, which had its world premiere at the Fantasia International Film Festival in Montreal.

Hough directed a musical special for television series League of Steam called "The Invitation To Armageddon". The episode was nominated for various awards and won awards at DragonCon and WebAsia. He also directed the music video "Enemy" for Chris Jericho's band Fozzy.

His Google panel contains erroneous film credits as an actor, which are in fact of the actor Paul Courtenay Hyu. Google have been informed but appear to move slowly.

== Awards and nominations ==
Year	Award	Organization	Work	Category	Result
2019	Best Musical	Asia Web Awards	The Invitation To Armagedon	Best Musical	Won
2019	Best Musical	Apuilia Web Fest	The Invitation To Armageddon	Best Musical	Won
2019	Best Directing	KWC Film Fest	The Invitation To Armageddon	Best Directing (Series)	Won
2018	Jury Award	Roma Web Fest	The Invitation To Armageddon	Best Sci-Fi	Won
2016	Best Comedy	DragonCon	The Invitation To Armageddon	Best Short	Won
2013	Best Feature Film	Macabro Film Festival	The Human Race	Best Feature	Won
2013	Best Feature Film	Tri-Citites International Film Festival	The Human Race	Best Feature	Won
2013	Best Feature Film	DragonCon	The Human Race	Best Feature	Won
2013	Grand Prize	Long Island International Film Expo	The Human Race	Best Feature	Won
2012	Jury Award	Utopiales De Nantes	The Human Race	Best Director	Won
2007	Best Short Film	London Sci-Fi Film Festival	The Angel	Best Short	Won
2007	Festival Prize	Long Island International Film Expo	The Angel	Best Short	Won
2007	Jury Award	Long Island International Film Expo	The Angel	Best Short	Won
2007	Best Short Film	Fant-Asia Film Festival	The Angel	Short Film	Won
2007	Jury Award	Newport Beach Film Festival	The Angel	Short Film	Won
2007	10 Degrees Hotter Award	Valley Film Festival	The Angel	Short Film, Jury Award	Won
2007	Best Short	California Film Festival	The Angel	Short Film	Won
2003	Audience Award	Brooklyn International Film Festival	The Backyard	Best Documentary	Won
2002	Festival Prize	Los Angeles Silver Lake Film Festival	The Backyard	Best Picture	Won
2002	Jury Award	Sonoma Valley Film Festival	The Backyard	Best Lounge Film	Won
2002	Director's Choice	Texas Film Festival	The Backyard	Best Film	Won
2002	Critic's Choice	Edinburgh International Film Festival	The Backyard	Best Film	Won
