= Diffring =

Diffring is a surname. Notable people with the surname include:

- Anton Diffring (1918–1989), German actor
- Jacqueline Diffring (1920–2020), German-British sculptor, sister of Anton
