= Peter Mayhew (disambiguation) =

Peter Mayhew (1944–2019) was an English-American actor, famous for playing Chewbacca in the Star Wars film series.

Peter Mayhew may also refer to:

- Peter Mayhew (biologist), British biologist
- Peter Mayhew (film editor), British film editor
