= Frederick Schiller =

Austrian-born British film actor (1901–1994)

- Born: 23 August 1901; Vienna, Austria
- Died: 29 September 1994 (aged 93); Wellingborough, Northamptonshire, England
- Occupation: Actor
- Years active: 1938–1985

Frederick Schiller (23 August 1901 – 29 September 1994) was an Austrian-born British film actor. He appeared in more than 70 films from 1944 to 1985.

== Filmography ==
=== Film ===
Year	Title	Role	Notes
1938	The Lady Vanishes	Man at Zolnay Station	Uncredited
1944	Mr. Emmanuel	Examiner	
1946	The Captive Heart	German M.O.	
1948	Counterblast	German POW	Uncredited
1950	Highly Dangerous	Policeman in Frances' Hotel Room	Uncredited
1952	Secret People	Galbern's Bodyguard	
1953	Park Plaza 605	Ivan Burgin	
1953	Albert R.N.	Herman	
1955	The Colditz Story	German Soldier	
1955	Oh... Rosalinda!!	Gentleman	
1956	Who Done It?	Gruber	
1956	Zarak	2nd Lounger	Uncredited
1956	Reach for the Sky	German Soldier	Uncredited
1957	The Traitor	Alfred Baum	
1957	Lady of Vengeance	Schleigel	
1957	Small Hotel	Foreigner	
1957	Blue Murder at St. Trinian's	Violinist	Uncredited
1958	The Trollenberg Terror	Mayor Klein	
1959	Operation Amsterdam	Tugmaster	
1959	The Lady Is a Square		Uncredited
1960	Sink the Bismarck!	Damage Control Officer, Bismarck	Uncredited
1963	Sammy Going South	Head Porter Luxor Hotel	
1967	The Double Man	Ticket Seller	
1967	The Dirty Dozen	drunken German General	Uncredited
1975	Barry Lyndon	Herr Von Potzdorf (Minister of Police)	
1979	Quincy's Quest	Smithy	

=== Television ===
Year	Title	Role	Notes
1960	Danger Man	Country Doctor	Episode: The Girl in Pink Pyjamas
1961	The House Under the Water	Mr. Dagmar	
1962	The Avengers	Jules Meyer	Episode: Propellant 23
1963	Ghost Squad	Nyziac Senior	
1963	Espionage	Schliefer	
1965	The Saint	Otto	
1976	The Expert	Jan Skidelsky	Series 4, Episode 7, "Suspicious Death"
1985	Honour, Profit and Pleasure	Waltz	TV film
