= Shadow of a Man =

1956 film by Michael McCarthy

- Opening titles
- Directed by: Michael McCarthy
- Screenplay by: Paul Erickson
- Produced by: E.J. Fancey
- Starring: Paul Carpenter; Rona Anderson; Jane Griffiths
- Cinematography: Geoffrey Faithfull
- Edited by: Monica Kimick
- Production company: E.J. Fancey Productions
- Release date: 28 February 1955
- Running time: 70 minutes
- Country: United Kingdom
- Language: English

Shadow of a Man is a 1955 British second feature ('B') crime film directed by Michael McCarthy and starring Paul Carpenter, Rona Anderson and Jane Griffiths. It was written by Paul Erickson based on his play Shadow of a Man.

== Premise ==
After a brawl in a nightclub a man is found dead at his home the following morning. It soon becomes apparent that he has been murdered, and the list of suspects seems quite small. Was it his badly treated wife, who found his dead body? Or was it the young woman with whom he'd had an affair – one of many – and who had been unaware that he was married? Or the friend of the couple who seems to be attracted to the young widow? Or is it possible that someone somehow gained to the flat entirely unseen?

An old friend of the husband turns up unexpectedly a few days later. At first defensive of his old buddy, he is shocked to discover that he was universally disliked due to his abusive and aggressive behaviour, made worse by his heavy drinking and drug taking. Still, he decides to try to find out who the killer is, a search culminating in a fight on the pier, and, it seems, another death.

== Cast ==
- Paul Carpenter as Gene Landers
- Rona Anderson as Linda Bryant
- Jane Griffiths as Carol Seaton
- Tony Quinn as Inspector Gates
- Ronald Leigh-Hunt as Norman Farrel
- Bill Nagy as Paul Bryant
- Jack Taylor as Sergeant McBride
- Robert O'Neil as Max
- Diana Chesney as Mrs Carter
- Rose Alba as cabaret singer

== Reception ==
The Monthly Film Bulletin wrote: "Quite a pleasant little thriller, freshly directed, mainly told within the framework by one of the protagonists, and with some competent camerawork. Paul Carpenter is efficient and the rest of the cast adequate, although Ronald Leigh Hunt gives an over-melodramatic performance. The film is aided by some good location shooting amongst the holiday crowds at Hastings."

Kine Weekly wrote: "The picture is not staged on an elaborate scale and it has a few loose ends but the penultimate action, reinforced by compelling sentiment, is crisp."
