= Michael McCarthy (film director) =

British director and screenwriter (1917–1959)

Michael McCarthy (27 February 1917 – 7 May 1959) was a British screenwriter and television and film director. He entered the film industry in 1934 and worked at the Crown Film Unit. He directed some of the first films for Anglo-Amalgamated. His last film was Operation Amsterdam.

He died aged 42, survived by a wife and three children. A Variety obituary said he was "regarded as a director of considerable promise".

== Selected filmography ==
- Greek Testament (1943) (documentary) - assistant director
- My Learned Friend (1943) - assistant director
- San Demetrio London (1943) - assistant director
- The Halfway House (1944) - assistant director
- While Nero Fiddled (1944) aka Fiddlers Three - assistant director
- The Girl of the Canal (1945) aka Painted Boats (short feature) - story
- Johnny Frenchman (1945) - unit manager
- Feature Story (1949) (short feature) - director
- No Highway in the Sky (1951) - actor
- Assassin for Hire (1951) - director
- Mystery Junction (1951) - director, writer
- Road Sense (1951) (instructional film) - director
- Hunted (1952) - idea
- Crow Hollow (1952) - director
- Wheel of Fate (1953) - actor
- Behind the Headlines (1953) - actor
- Forces' Sweetheart (1953) - actor
- Flannelfoot (1953) - actor
- John of the Fair (1954) - director, writer
- Douglas Fairbanks, Jr., Presents (1954–55) - director, writer - including The Awakening (1954)
- Shadow of a Man (1955) - director, additional scenes
- The Adventures of the Scarlet Pimpernel (1955) - director
- It's Never Too Late (1956) - director
- Assignment Foreign Legion (1956–57) (TV series) - director
- The Traitor (1957) aka The Accursed - director, writer
- Wire Service (1957) (TV series) - director
- Sailor of Fortune (1957) (TV series) - director
- Operation Amsterdam (1959) - director, writer
