= Ronald Leigh-Hunt =

British actor (1920–2005)

- As Buchan in Freewheelers (1971)
- Born: Ronald Frederick Leigh-Hunt; 5 October 1920; London, England
- Died: 12 September 2005 (aged 84); Isleworth, Middlesex, England
- Education: Italia Conti Academy of Theatre Arts
- Occupation: Actor
- Relatives: Barbara Leigh-Hunt (cousin)

Ronald Frederick Leigh-Hunt (5 October 1920 – 12 September 2005) was a British film and television actor.

His father was a stockbroker and he attended the Italia Conti Academy. He began acting whilst serving in the army. Though never a major star, he appeared in over a hundred television and film productions over a forty-year period, including as King Arthur in The Adventures of Sir Lancelot in the mid-1950s, and General Hospital in the early 1970s.

He appeared in Danger Man and twice in Doctor Who, as Commander Radnor in The Seeds of Death (1969) and as Commander Stevenson in Revenge of the Cybermen (1975); and between 1968 and 1971 starred as Colonel Buchan in five series of the children's TV drama Freewheelers. Later he appeared in "You Lose Some, You Win Some", an episode of series 2 of Minder and "Children of Auron" in the third series of Blake's 7.

His film appearances included The League of Gentlemen (1960), Le Mans (1971) and The Omen (1976).

In his later years he was a familiar sight at the Green Room Club where he was an honorary member.

His cousin was the actress Barbara Leigh-Hunt.

== Selected filmography ==
- No Orchids for Miss Blandish (1948) - Grisson's Guard (uncredited)
- Blackout (1950) - Dr. Langley
- No Trace (1950) - Party Guest (uncredited)
- Paul Temple Returns (1952) - Inspector Ross
- Tread Softly (1952) - Inspector Hinton
- The Broken Horseshoe (1953) - Sgt. Lewis
- Three Steps to the Gallows (1953) - Capt. Adams
- Forces' Sweetheart (1953) - Navy C.O.
- Flannelfoot (1953) - Dr. Milligan
- Johnny on the Spot (1954) - Jeremy Oulton (uncredited)
- Tiger by the Tail (1955) - Doctor Scott, psychiatrist
- Shadow of a Man (1956) - Norman Farrel
- Assignment Redhead (1956) - Col. Julian Fentriss M.I.5.
- Action Stations (1956) - Kleivar
- Zoo Baby (1957) - Supt. Copton
- A Touch of Larceny (1960) - 2nd Editor (uncredited)
- Sink the Bismarck! (1960) - Somers, Officer on 'King George V' (uncredited)
- The League of Gentlemen (1960) - Police Superintendent - Final Scene (uncredited)
- Oscar Wilde (1960) - Lionel Johnson
- Piccadilly Third Stop (1960) - Police Sergeant
- The Hand (1960) - Munyard
- Very Important Person (1961) - Clynes
- We Joined the Navy (1962) - Commander Royal Navy
- Der Schwur des Soldaten Pooley (1963) - (uncredited)
- Seventy Deadly Pills (1964) - Sergeant
- The Third Secret (1964) - Police Officer
- The Pumpkin Eater (1964) - 2nd Man in Bar (uncredited)
- Curse of Simba (1965) - Doctor
- The Liquidator (1965) - Mac
- Khartoum (1966) - Lord Northbrook (uncredited)
- Where the Bullets Fly (1966) - Thursby
- Hostile Witness (1968) - Dr. Wimborne
- Clegg (1970) - Inspector Kert
- Le Mans (1971) - David Townsend
- Universal Soldier (1971) - St. George
- Baxter! (1973) - Mr. Fishie
- The Omen (1976) - Gentleman at Rugby Match
- The Message (1976) - Heraclius
- Who Is Killing the Great Chefs of Europe? (1978) - Priest marrying Bobby and Natasha (uncredited)
- Frankenstein (1992) - Alphonse

=== Television ===
Year	Title	Role	Notes
1956-1957	The Adventures of Sir Lancelot	King Arthur	22 Episodes
1963	The Human Jungle	George Hunter	Episode: "The Vacant Chair"
1963	The Scales of Justice	Jimmy Donovan	Episode: "The Invisible Asset"
1964	Edgar Wallace Mysteries	Prison Governor	Episode: "Face of a Stranger"
1968-1971	Freewheelers	Colonel Buchan	Series 1-4 & 6, 61 Episodes
1969	Department S	Peregrine Haslet-Wood	Episode: "The Perfect Operation"
1973	Van der Valk	Paul Bekker	Episode: "Season for Love"
1978	The Professionals	Doctor Binney	Episode: "Stake Out"
