= A Question of Adultery =

1958 British film by Don Chaffey

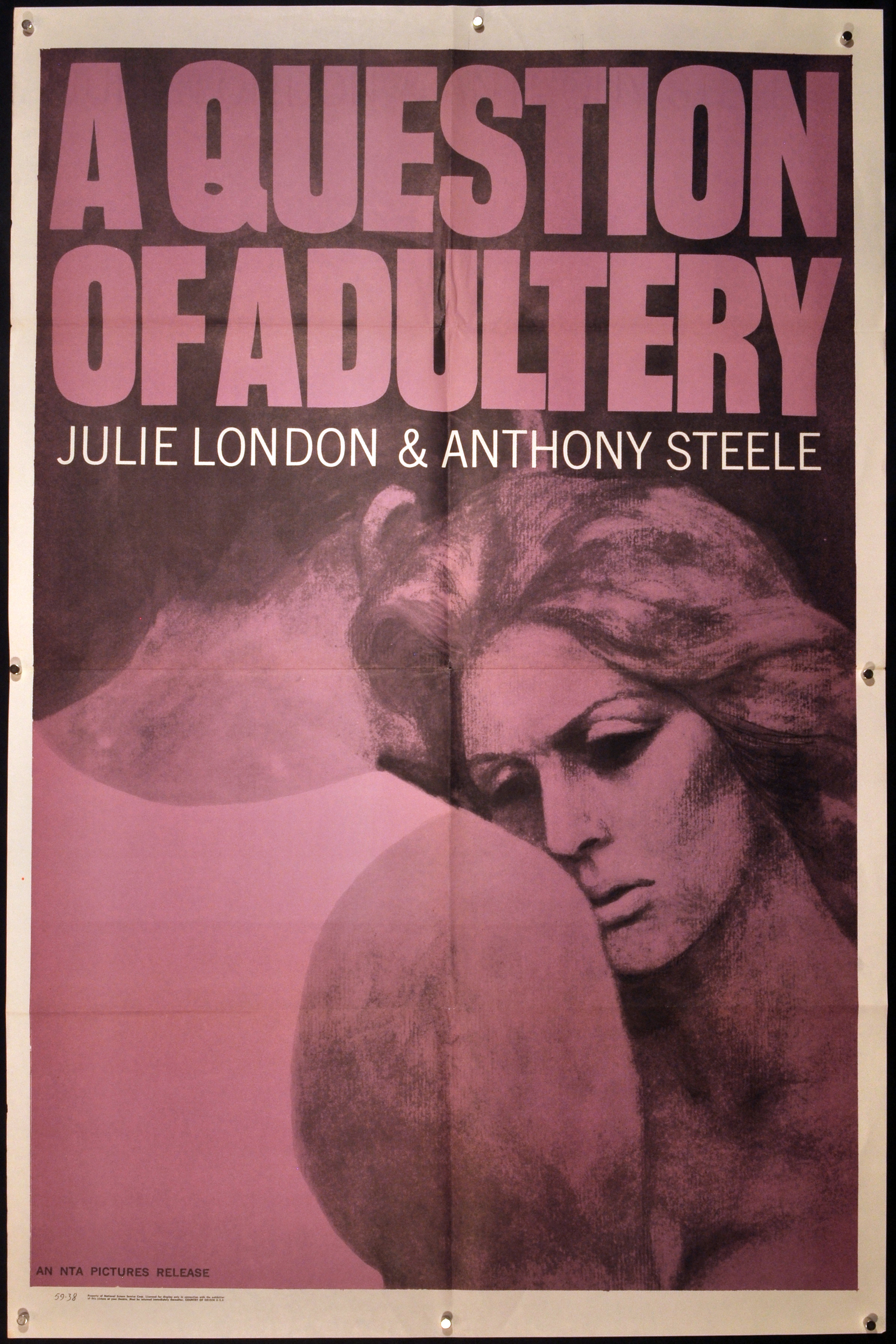
- Theatrical poster
- Directed by: Don Chaffey
- Written by: Anne Edwards
- Produced by: Raymond Stross
- Starring: Julie London; Anthony Steel
- Cinematography: Stephen Dade
- Music by: Phillip Green
- Production company: Raymond Stross Productions
- Distributed by: Eros Films; NTA (US)
- Release date: 15 July 1958 (UK)
- Running time: 86 minutes
- Country: United Kingdom
- Language: English

A Question of Adultery (U.S. title: The Case of Mrs. Loring) is a 1958 British drama film directed by Don Chaffey and starring Julie London and Anthony Steel.

It was written by Anne Edwards, based on the 1948 play Breach of Marriage by Dan Sutherland. A novelisation of the film was written by Gordon Wellesley.

The controversial nature of the film led to it being given an X rating in the UK and rated "Condemned" by the US Roman Catholic Legion of Decency, leading to the film being delayed for release in the United States.

== Plot ==
Racing driver Mark Loring, heir to the Loring fortune, complements his competitive spirit with jealousy of his wife Mary. Enraged by the attention shown to her by a 'fan' during an evening at a restaurant, the couple is greeted by longtime friends of Mark's family, who invite them to join them at their table. Mark declines, but relents by saying, "Just one drink."

After divulging to Mary that Mark's mother was a singer who walked out on the family when Mark "was a baby", Mrs. Duncan asks Mary (who also was a singer), to sing a favorite old song. Mark tells Mary not to but she defies him and does. Miffed, Mark purposely doesn't light Mary's cigarette, upon which she retaliates by leaning over, exposing her cleavage to Mr. Duncan, who delightedly obliges.

Seconds later, Mary runs to the beach and Mark follows. He asks what the devil she's trying to do to him, and proceeds to make angry and fiery love to her. After their reconciliation of the night before, Mark once again becomes jealous when Mary receives a call from her fan, who wants to return her dropped glove from the previous day's race. Mark pouts that he "doesn't care to share her, he never seems to have her to himself, and there's always something – somebody". With that, Mark decides to whisk Mary away, home to London.

During their drive, Mary tells Mark that she is going to have a baby, and Mark replies, "Ours, I hope." Mary slaps Mark and they get into an accident. While they recover in separate rooms, Mark's father, Sir John, tells him that Mary lost their unborn child, while the doctor informs Mary that Mark is sterile. When the couple come together, they console each other; however, Mark is unaware of his condition. Mark's father anticipates and hopes the affair will end, and attempts to buy Mary off. She, however, holds firm and tells Sir John Loring she's not for sale, that she and her husband need to be alone, and what Mark doesn't know is that his father is his enemy.

Upon telling Mark she wants a baby, Mary learns that Mark's father later revealed to him that he is sterile. She comes up with the idea of artificial insemination and attempts to resolve their difficulties by travelling with him to a clinic in Switzerland. She soon becomes pregnant, but Mark becomes alienated from the idea, convincing himself that Mary is having an affair with a local skier, Dieter, who helped her to his cabin after she injured her ankle on the slopes.

Returning to London alone, Mark and his father take Mary to court for divorce on the charge that artificial insemination is a form of adultery. Undeterred, Mary decides to fight to preserve the reputation of her unborn child, and to confirm why another child would bring the two closer together. She only wanted her husband's love – although the prosecution cries 'material benefit' to Mrs. Loring.

During proceedings, Mary's attorney encourages her to continue when she wants to quit. He needs her permission to re-examine her husband's character. Upon cross-examination, Mark's jealous personality is brought into clear view. It's established that Mark was jealous from the very outset of the marriage, and that the divorce proceedings were motivated by his unreasonable and uncontrollable jealousy.

Mark is also reminded that he made a spectacle of his wife during the Iberian Grand Prix. At the Hotel Playa, he raped his wife while other eyes were watching from a terrace overlooking the public beach – even though he was aware, yet his wife was unwilling. Mark's actions are further put on trial when it's noted that he told his wife he would "make up" for their loss of the baby, that he signed a document agreeing to his wife's artificial insemination but later changed his mind (without saying so), and that he had sex with her after she first told him she was pregnant. This proved he condoned and accepted her 'condition'.

Sir John is also cross-examined about his feelings (similar to those he felt towards his former wife) toward his son's wife, and in the process it's uncovered that a bribe was offered. Sir John claims he was protecting his son by informing him of his sterility, his passing infatuation with his wife, and the protection of the Loring Estate. In deep contemplation after the senior Loring's testimony, Mark exits the courtroom for a cigarette, without a word to his father.

Dr. Cameron is next to defend his position. The prosecution's claim of 'technical adultery' by artificial insemination is struck down as not being adultery at all. Producing a baby 'artificially', via 'test tube' and not via intercourse, is ruled not the same as adultery. Moreover, the definition of adultery also negates the very act of which Mary was accused.

In the end, Mark stands up to his father, finally realizing he's made a mess of his marriage and recognizing his father as the controlling figure who is playing God. He walks out, telling his father there will be no more dinners. Back in court, Dieter offers his assistance to Mary, should she ever be in need. Mark and Mary meet while awaiting the decision; he tells her he will always love her.

The verdict can't be read, as the jurors are unable to agree. Mark refuses a retrial and says he was completely wrong and should never have brought the action. Through his attorney, Mark begs the court's indulgence, apologizes for the trouble he's caused, withdraws the charges, and asks the judge to dismiss the petition. His response: "I find this an eminently satisfactory ending." The closing shot is of Mark waiting for and receiving Mary as they walk together, with 'Strange Affair' playing in the background.

== Cast ==
- Julie London as Mary Loring
- Anthony Steel as Mark Loring
- Basil Sydney as Sir John Loring
- Donald Houston as Mr. Jacobus
- Anton Diffring as Carl Dieter
- Andrew Cruickshank as Dr. Cameron
- Frank Thring as Mr. Stanley
- Conrad Phillips as Mario
- Kynaston Reeves as Judge
- Mary Mackenzie as Nurse Parsons
- Georgina Cookson as Mrs. Duncan
- Richard Caldicot as Mr. Duncan
- John Rae as jury foreman
- Sam Kydd as court reporter

== Breach of Marriage ==
The original play was performed in the late 1940s. It was presented by actor-manager Peter Reynolds.

== Production ==
It was the first movie about artificial insemination. It was produced by Raymond Stross, who had just enjoyed box office success with The Flesh Is Weak (1957), a story of prostitution, directed by Don Chaffey.

Stross was talking about making a film of the play in 1953.

The film was announced in August 1957. It was reportedly based on an original story by Anne Edwards, written with producer Raymond Stross. The film was approved "in principle" by the Production Code, but final approval had to be given on seeing the final movie. The title came about because British courts at the time regarded artificial insemination as adultery.

The original stars were to be Julie London and John Cassavetes.

In October, Rick Jason was offered the male lead, but he turned it down. Eventually, Anthony Steel was cast. Filming began in England in November 1957 at Elstree Studios. The film was also known during production as My Strange Affair, the title of a song that London sings in the film.

Producer Raymond Stross described it as "a very clean film that is accurate and authentic." The film was to be released on a special handling basis by Theatrical Presentations. Part of the finance came from American Joe Harris' Essex Company.

== Soundtrack ==
"My Strange Affair", music and lyrics by Bobby Troup, sung by Julie London.

== Reception ==
The Monthly Film Bulletin wrote: "Dan Sutherland's play Breach of Marriage, itself hardly a well-argued discussion of the problem of artificial insemination, has here been given the full catchpenny treatment by the producer-director team responsible for The Flesh is Weak. As an entertainment the film is unlikely to appeal to anyone other than the emotionally retarded. Its dramatics are cheap, its presentation lurid, and any attempt at balance non-existent. Students of the bizarre will no doubt find the rape scene intercut with a climactic flamenco dance to their taste."

Variety called it "a soggy novelitish affair" in which "stilted dialogue and a screenplay that sits firmly on the fence has resulted in a subject of some significance being wasted."

Filmink called it "a fascinatingly odd courtroom drama about artificial insemination, with Steel as a possessive infertile racing car driver married to Julie London, roused to jealousy at the thought of someone else impregnating her. Frank Thring is superb as a barrister, London sings a random song, and there's a sequence where Steel ravishes London on a Spanish beach intercut with a flamenco performer; Steel is quite effective as a man tormented by his lack of potency."

The film was released in Los Angeles in April 1959. The Los Angeles Times said the film "appears to be more sensational than it really is."

The New York Times said: "the film's extensive discussion of the problem seems, at best, superfluous."
