= Johnny on the Spot =

1954 British film by Maclean Rogers

- Opening titles
- Directed by: Maclean Rogers
- Written by: Michael Cronin (novel); Maclean Rogers
- Produced by: Edwin J. Fancey
- Starring: Hugh McDermott; Elspet Gray; Paul Carpenter
- Cinematography: Geoffrey Faithfull
- Edited by: Monica Kimick
- Production company: E. J. Fancey Productions
- Release date: 7 June 1954
- Running time: 72 minutes
- Country: United Kingdom
- Language: English

Johnny on the Spot is a 1954 British 'B' crime drama film directed by Maclean Rogers and starring Hugh McDermott, Elspet Gray and Paul Carpenter. It was written by Rogers based on the 1953 novel Paid in Full by Michael Cronin.

== Cast ==
- Hugh McDermott as Johnny Breakes
- Elspet Gray as Joan Ingram
- Paul Carpenter as Paul Carrington
- Jean Lodge as Sally Erskine
- Ronald Adam as Inspector Beveridge
- Valentine Dyall as Tyneley
- Graham Stark as Stevie
- Bruce Beeby as hotel garage attendant
- Ronald Leigh-Hunt as Jeremy Oulton
- Conrad Phillips as Police Sergeant

== Plot ==
Johnny Breakes is an ex-convict who has just finished serving a prison sentence in a South American jail after being falsely accused and framed for a crime. He returns to England determined to find the man who put him away, Lewis Osborne, the person responsible for his trumped-up charges. Upon arriving at Osborne's home to confront him, Johnny discovers that Osborne has already been murdered. Finding himself at the scene of a crime with a dead body, Johnny realises he needs to track down a missing diary and find the actual culprits to clear his own name before the police catch up with him. Along the way, he teams up with Joan Ingram to navigate a dangerous web of thrills, suspects, and police pursuit.

== Production ==
It was shot at Bushey Studios and on location in London.

== Reception ==
The Monthly Film Bulletin wrote: "An indifferently made thriller, so confused in its narrative development that the plot becomes at times very nearly incomprehensible."

Kine Weekly wrote: "The picture keeps well on the move and, despite the fact that its sense of direction is none too sure, neatly tempers suspense with refreshing romance. Hugh McDermott registers as Johnny and Elspet Gray pleases as Joan, but neither has anything on Ronald Adam, as Inspector Beveridge. The last-named never gives an indifferent performance. Well-varied backgrounds effectively clothe the crowded play's many facets."

Picturegoer wrote: "Anxious to clear himself before the police get cracking, Johnny teams up with Joan. Result: nice batch of thrills."

In British Sound Films: The Studio Years 1928–1959 David Quinlan rated the film as "mediocre", writing: "Difficult to follow – or to care."
