= Richard Caldicot =

British actor (1908–1995)

- in The Prisoner: Many Happy Returns (1967)
- Born: Richard Caldicot-Bull; 7 October 1908; London, England
- Died: 16 October 1995 (aged 87); London, England
- Occupation: Actor
- Years active: 1928–1994

Richard Caldicot (7 October 1908 – 16 October 1995) was an English actor famed for his role of Commander (later Captain) Povey in the BBC radio series The Navy Lark. He also appeared often on television, memorably as the obstetrician delivering Betty Spencer's baby in Some Mothers Do 'Ave 'Em.

His father was a civil servant and he attended Dulwich College prior to training at the Royal Academy of Dramatic Art. He then appeared in repertory theatre and on the London stage from 1928. Among numerous West End appearances, he played Lance-Corporal Broughton in the original production of Journey's End from 1929 to 1930, Harry Soames in Edward, My Son (1947–49) and Mr Bromhead in No Sex Please, We're British from 1971 to 1976. His film debut was in The Million Pound Note (1954).

Caldicot's television appearances include The Four Just Men, Department S, The Prisoner: "Many Happy Returns", Steptoe and Son, Vanity Fair, Fawlty Towers and Coronation Street. He was also seen in the United States on The Beverly Hillbillies.

Caldicot worked virtually right up till his death in October 1995.

== Filmography ==
- Calling Bulldog Drummond (1951) – Judge (uncredited)
- The Million Pound Note (1954) – James, the Butler (uncredited)
- One Good Turn (1955) – Mr. Bigley
- A Question of Adultery (1958) – Mr. Duncan
- Virgin Island (1958)
- The Horse's Mouth (1958) – Roberts (uncredited)
- Room at the Top (1959) – Taxi Driver (uncredited)
- Horrors of the Black Museum (1959) – Ted, barman in night club (uncredited)
- Follow a Star (1959) – Conductor (uncredited)
- Clue of the Twisted Candle (1960) – Ake Pisher
- The Trials of Oscar Wilde (1960) – Bookshop Proprietor (uncredited)
- Dentist on the Job (1961) – Prison Governor
- The Court Martial of Major Keller (1961) – Harrison
- The Durant Affair (1962) – The Judge
- The Battleaxe (1962) – Judge
- Le voyage à Biarritz (1963)
- The V.I.P.s (1963) – Hotel Representative (uncredited)
- Echo of Diana (1963) – Fisher
- The Sicilians (1963) – Police Commissioner
- The Spy Who Came In from the Cold (1965) – Mr. Pitt (uncredited)
- You Must Be Joking! (1965) – (uncredited)
- The Weekend Murders (1970) – Mr. Caldicot, the lawyer
- The Rise and Rise of Michael Rimmer (1970) – Bream
- Professor Popper's Problem (1974) – Headmaster
- Eskimo Nell (1975) – Ambrose Cream
- Adventures of a Private Eye (1977) – Craddock
- Adventures of a Plumber's Mate (1978) – Wallings
- Firepower (1979) – Harry Calman
- Mountains of the Moon (1990) – Lord Russell
- The Fool (1990) – Duke
