= The Million Pound Note =

1954 British comedy film

- British theatrical poster
- Directed by: Ronald Neame
- Screenplay by: Jill Craigie
- Based on: The Million Pound Bank Note by Mark Twain
- Produced by: John Bryan; Earl St. John; Ronald Neame
- Starring: Gregory Peck; Ronald Squire; Wilfrid Hyde-White; Jane Griffiths
- Cinematography: Geoffrey Unsworth
- Edited by: Clive Donner
- Music by: William Alwyn
- Production company: Group Film Productions
- Distributed by: General Film Distributors
- Release date: 7 January 1954
- Running time: 90 minutes
- Country: United Kingdom
- Language: English
- Box office: $1.1 million

The Million Pound Note (U.S. title: Man with a Million) is a 1954 British comedy film directed by Ronald Neame and starring Gregory Peck, Ronald Squire, Wilfrid Hyde-White and Jane Griffiths. It was written by Jill Craigie based on the 1893 Mark Twain short story "The Million Pound Bank Note", and is a precursor to the 1983 film Trading Places. It was released by Rank's General Film Distributors, and in America by United Artists.

== Plot ==
In 1903, American seaman Henry Adams is stranded penniless in Britain and gets caught up in an unusual wager between two wealthy, eccentric brothers, Oliver and Roderick Montpelier. They persuade the Bank of England to issue a one million pound banknote, which they present to Adams in an envelope, only telling him that it contains some money. Oliver asserts that the mere existence of the note will enable the possessor to obtain whatever he needs, while Roderick insists that it would have to be spent for it to be of any use.

Once Adams gets over the shock of discovering how much the note is worth, he tries to return it to the brothers, but is told that they have left for a month. He then finds a letter in the envelope, explaining the wager and promising him a job if he can avoid spending the note for the month.

At first, everything goes as Oliver had predicted. Adams is mistaken for an eccentric millionaire and has no trouble getting food, clothes, and a hotel suite on credit, just by showing his note. The story of the note is reported in the newspapers. Adams is welcomed into exclusive social circles, meeting the American ambassador and English aristocracy. He becomes very friendly with Portia Lansdowne, the niece of the Duchess of Cromarty. Then fellow American Lloyd Hastings asks him to back a business venture. Hastings tells Adams that he does not have to put up any money himself; the mere association will allow Hastings to raise the money that he needs to develop his gold mine by selling shares.

Trouble arises when the Duke of Frognal, who had been unceremoniously evicted from the suite Adams now occupies, hides the note as a joke. When Adams is unable to produce the note, panic breaks out amongst the shareholders and Adams's creditors. All is straightened out in the end, and Adams is able to return the note to the Montpelier brothers at the end of the month.

== Cast ==
- Gregory Peck as Henry Adams
- Ronald Squire as Oliver Montpelier
- Wilfrid Hyde-White as Roderick Montpelier
- Jane Griffiths as Portia Lansdowne
- Joyce Grenfell as Duchess of Cromarty
- A. E. Matthews as Duke of Frognal
- Maurice Denham as Mr. Reid
- Reginald Beckwith as Rock
- Brian Oulton as Lloyd
- John Slater as Parsons
- Wilbur Evans as American ambassador
- Hartley Power as Hastings
- George Devine as restaurant proprietor
- Bryan Forbes as Todd
- Gudrun Ure as Renie
- Hugh Wakefield as Duke of Cromarty
- Ronald Adam as Samuel Clemens
- Felix Felton as Alfred
- Richard Caldicot as James, the butler
- Hugh Griffith as Potter
- Ann Lancaster as Doris
- Laurence Naismith as Walter Craddock
- Gibb McLaughlin as Sir William Collinge
- Ernest Thesiger as Mr. Garrett
- Percy Marmont as Lord Hurlingham
- Joan Hickson as Maggie
- Harold Goodwin as Horace
- Henryetta Edwards as Lady Jane
- Winifred Evans as Lady Hurlingham
- Jack McNaughton as Williams
- Hal Osmond as Arthur
- Mae Bacon as Alfred's wife
- Peggy Ann Clifford as Assistant Matron
- Fanny Carby as nursemaid at Belgrave Square
- Eliot Makeham as Consulate official
- Hugh Latimer as hotel receptionist
- Roddy Hughes as clergyman
- Totti Truman Taylor as singer
- Leonard Sharp as cabbie
- Willoughby Goddard as stockbroker

== Production ==
The short story had previously been adapted for British TV in 1950.

Director Ronald Neame and producer John Bryan had just enjoyed a big success for Rank with The Card, a comedy based on a comic novel. They decided to film Mark Twain's short story and hired Jill Craigie to adapt it into a screenplay. John Davis of the Rank Organisation wanted a star to play the lead role, so Neame and Bryan approached Gregory Peck, who was then in France, seeing the woman he would marry. Peck wanted to stay in Europe, liked the screenplay and agreed to make the film. United Artists agreed to provide some finance, enabling the filmmakers to afford Peck's fee, which Neame says was £75,000. His signing was announced in April 1953.

Neame wanted Dinah Sheridan to play the female lead but she had retired. "We were in desperate straights because he could not find a girl," he said. Jane Griffiths was cast.

Filming started May 1953. The majority of filming took place in Pinewood Studios with sets were designed by John Box and Jack Maxsted. The director also made use of locations such as Belgrave Square.

== Release ==
The film was given a royal premiere in Auckland New Zealand in front of the Queen and the Duke of Edinburgh.

== Reception ==
=== Box office ===
Kine Weekly reported that the film was a hit in Hungary where by 1961 it had been seen by 2.1 million people. According to Variety, in Australia the film "made records in the houses played", and earned rentals of $1.1 million in North America.

=== Critical ===
The Monthly Film Bulletin wrote: "Mark Twain's short story, an anecdote which gently satirises the credit system, scarcely provides sufficient material for a ninety minute film; in filling it out the script writer, Jill Craigie, has introduced some routine plot complications, in the course of which the joke wears more than a little thin. ... Gregory Peck, though not very well suited to the part, gives an amiable performance as the temporary millionaire."

Variety wrote: "Throughout the narrative, there is a pleasant degree of humor and a simple romantic theme. The basic idea is good for a few chuckles and there are some nice laugh situations derived from the dumb performance of Reginald Beckwith as a speechless, penniless weightlifter who assists Peck. The acting attains an all-round level of competence and, apart from a characteristic performance by the male star, there is a highly satisfactory portrayal by Jane Griffiths in the romantic lead. ... Ronald Neame has directed the piece smoothly."

Pauline Kael wrote "This ingratiating English comedy failed completely in this country [the USA]; Americans may have assumed from the author’s name that the film (which is set in Twain’s period) was a dull classic."

Filmink argued the two main flaws of the movie were the casting of Gregory Peck and the film's plotting.
