= Oscar Quitak =

British stage, film and television actor (1926–2023)

- Born: Oscar Morris Quitak; 10 March 1926; London, England
- Died: 31 December 2023 (aged 97); Ibiza, Spain
- Occupation: Actor
- Years active: 1946–1993
- Spouse: Andrée Melly (m. 1964; died 2020)
- Children: 2

Oscar Morris Quitak (10 March 1926 – 31 December 2023) was a British television actor.

Quitak's stage work includes roles at the Old Vic and the National Theatre; as well as the original West End and Broadway productions of the musical Pickwick, in 1963 and 1965. His television credits include: Z-Cars, Man in a Suitcase, Doomwatch, Ace of Wands, Colditz, The Changes, The New Avengers, Open All Hours, Kessler as Josef Mengele, Chessgame, Howards' Way, A Very British Coup, Yes, Prime Minister, Saracen, Lovejoy and Telltale.

== Personal life and death ==
Quitak lived in Ibiza with his wife of 62 years, the actress Andrée Melly, who died on 31 January 2020. The marriage produced two children. He died there on 31 December 2023, at the age of 97.

== Partial filmography ==
- The Guinea Pig (1948) – David Tracey
- It's Hard to Be Good (1948) – Man in Town Hall (uncredited)
- Cairo Road (1950) – Bedouin Boy
- The Dark Man (1951) – 2nd Reporter
- Hell Is Sold Out (1951) – Jacques, waiter
- So Little Time (1952) – Gerard
- Something Money Can't Buy (1952) – 2nd Assistant director
- Top of the Form (1953) – Septimus
- The Crowded Day (1954) – Youth
- The Colditz Story (1955) – Prisoner of War (uncredited)
- The Prisoner (1955) – Cafe Waiter (uncredited)
- Zarak (1956) – Youssuff
- Town on Trial (1957) – David
- The Traitor (1957) – Thomas Rilke
- The Revenge of Frankenstein (1958) – Dwarf
- Operation Amsterdam (1959) – Diamond Merchant
- Red Monarch (1983) – Mekhlis
- Bloodbath at the House of Death (1984) – Doctor
- Brazil (1985) – Interview Official
- Tangiers (1985) – Velatti
- Code Name: Emerald (1985) – Army Doctor
- Howards' Way (1985) – Richard Shellet
- Yes, Prime Minister (1986) – Chief Scientific Advisor
- A Very British Coup (1988) – Government Chief Scientific Adviser
