= Carl Jaffe =

German actor (1902–1974)

- Born: Karl Heinz Jaffe; 21 March 1902; Hamburg, German Empire
- Died: 12 April 1974 (aged 72); London, England
- Occupation: Actor
- Years active: 1934–1974

Carl Jaffe (21 March 1902 – 12 April 1974) was a German actor. Jaffe trained on the stage in his native Hamburg, Kassel and Wiesbaden before moving to Berlin, where his career began to develop.

In 1933 Jaffe changed his stage name to Frank Alwar, but in 1936, with the situation for Jews in Germany rapidly deteriorating, he made the decision to migrate to the United Kingdom. He remained in the UK for the rest of his life and appeared in more than 50 films and many television productions.

Throughout his British career he was often cast as German or Central European characters, usually in supporting roles, and often with a war, crime or espionage setting. His film roles include The Lion Has Wings, The Life and Death of Colonel Blimp, Two Thousand Women, Operation Amsterdam and The Roman Spring of Mrs. Stone. Jaffe's television credits included Danger Man, Dad's Army and Oh, Brother!.

== Partial filmography ==
- Second Best Bed (1938) - Georges Dubonnet
- Over the Moon (1939) - Michel
- The Silent Battle (1939) - Rykoff
- The Saint in London (1939) - Stengler
- The Lion Has Wings (1939) - Unnamed Character
- An Englishman's Home (1940) - Martin
- Law and Disorder (1940)
- Gasbags (1941) - Gestapo Chief
- Uncensored (1942) - Kohlmeier
- Squadron Leader X (1943) - Luftwaffe Colonel
- The Life and Death of Colonel Blimp (1943) - von Reumann
- Warn That Man (1943) - Schultz
- The Night Invader (1943) - Count von Biebrich
- Two Thousand Women (1944) - Sergt. Hentzner
- The Man from Morocco (1945) - German General
- I Didn't Do It (1945) - Hilary Vance
- Gaiety George (1946) - Kommandant
- Counterblast (1948) - Heinz
- The Blind Goddess (1948) - Johan Meyer
- I Was a Male War Bride (1949) - Jail Officer (uncredited)
- State Secret (1950) - Janovic Prada
- The Dancing Years (1950) - Headwaiter
- The Black Rose (1950) - Officer (uncredited)
- Lilli Marlene (1950) - Propaganda Chief
- A Tale of Five Cities (1951) - Charlotte's Brother
- Ivanhoe (1952) - Austrian Monk
- Appointment in London (1953) - German General
- Desperate Moment (1953) - Cellblock Guard Becker
- Park Plaza 605 (1953) - Boris Roff
- Betrayed (1954) - Major Plaaten (uncredited)
- Child's Play (1954) - Carl Blotz
- The Awakening (1954) - The Tailor
- Cross Channel (1955) - Otto Dagoff
- Timeslip (1955) - Dr. Marks (uncredited)
- Port of Escape (1956) - Ship's Officer
- Satellite in the Sky (1956) - Bechstein
- House of Secrets (1956) - Walter Dorffman
- The Hostage (1956) - Dr. Pablo Gonzuelo
- The Traitor (1957) - Stefan Toller
- Escapement (1958) - Dr. Hoff
- I Accuse! (1958) - Col. von Schwarzkoppen
- Battle of the V-1 (1958) - General
- Rockets Galore! (1958) - Dr. Hamburger
- Operation Amsterdam (1959) - Diamond Merchant
- First Man into Space (1959) - Dr. Paul von Essen
- Subway in the Sky (1959) - German Detective
- Man on a String (1960) - People's Judge
- Danger Man (TV, 1960) - Professor Barkoff
- The Roman Spring of Mrs. Stone (1961) - Baron Waldheim
- Doomsday at Eleven (1963) - Stefan
- Operation Crossbow (1965) - German Officer at Rocket Plant (uncredited)
- Up Jumped a Swagman (1965) - Analyst
- The Double Man (1967) - Police Surgeon
- Battle Beneath the Earth (1967) - Dr. Galissi
- The Enemy Within the Gates (Dad's Army episode)(1968) - Captain Winogrodzki
- Fiddler on the Roof (1971) - Isaac (uncredited)
