= Marina Kulik =

Dutch painter (born 1956)

Marina Johanna Kulik (born 13 July 1956 in The Hague) is a Dutch painter, known for her lively portrait paintings in aquarelle and for her poetic and original abstracts, all inspired by 'the mystery of life' - the MyDNA series, with chromosomes, cells, DNA and fingerprints.

== Biography ==
Kulik studied 'Monumental art' at the Utrecht School of the Arts 'Artibus' in Utrecht and since 2000 she works in the South of France. She teaches live model drawing, portrait and aquarelle at Centre des Arts 'le Hangar' in Chateauneuf de Grasse. She is founder of Aquarellista!, a movement for all artists who use Aquarelle as their main technique. Their objective is to promote the beautiful, subtle art of Aquarelle - to be taken seriously as an independent art form.

In 2012 she designed the 'Artbag' for Stop Aids Now. In 2011 she won the Prize of the Culture Council in the Grand Prix d'Aquarelle de Belgique. In 2010 and 2011 she participated as one of the main artists in the Holotropic Art Symposium in Romania.

Kulik has published a learning guide on aquarelle watercolour painting (the 2nd Hangar Watercolour Booklet) in 2009 and a book on cat-art, 'Chatatouille' dedicated to an exhibition of paintings and sculptures of cats together with sculptor Sally Ducrow.

Kulik frequently has solo exhibitions all over Europe including in England, Italy, Romania, Belgium, Sweden and especially in galleries in France (Vence, Cannes, Paris, Nice), and her home country the Netherlands (Amsterdam, Rotterdam, The Hague, Hilversum). She also exhibited in the United States (Seattle). For her abstracts she is represented by Gallery Oscar (Nice).

Kulik is part owner of a 52 ft classic yacht 'Avatar' that she crossed the Atlantic with. Before she became a full-time artist in 2000, she worked as a disc jockey for KRO radio and as a marketing director for Uniface and BMC Software
