= Down Among the Z Men =

1952 British film by Maclean Rogers

- Directed by: Maclean Rogers
- Written by: Francis Charles; Jimmy Grafton
- Produced by: E. J. Fancey; Jimmy Grafton
- Starring: Carole Carr; Harry Secombe; Peter Sellers; 12 Toppers; Michael Bentine; Spike Milligan
- Cinematography: Geoffrey Faithfull
- Edited by: Peter Mayhew
- Music by: Jack Jordan
- Production company: E.J. Fancey Productions
- Distributed by: New Realm Pictures
- Release date: October 1952
- Running time: 75 minutes
- Country: United Kingdom
- Language: English

Down Among the Z Men is a 1952 black-and-white British comedy film directed by Maclean Rogers and starring the Goons: Spike Milligan, Peter Sellers, Michael Bentine and Harry Secombe.

The movie was filmed early in the Goons' career before many of the show's recurring characters were created, and the stars only play one character each: Eccles (Milligan), Colonel Bloodnok (Sellers), Osric Pureheart (Bentine) and Harry Jones (Secombe).

== Plot ==
Harry Jones is a clerk in Mr Crab's general mercantile store and an amateur actor in community theatre, where he is currently playing a Scotland Yard inspector, "Batts of the Yard". When the absentminded Professor Osrick Pureheart leaves a secret military formula in the store, mayhem ensues as two suspicious secret agents (actually enemy spies), who have been shadowing the professor, question Harry regarding the professor, none of them realising that Harry now has the formula in his possession.

Convinced by the two spies to follow the professor, Harry goes to an Army post, Camp Warwell, where he is mistakenly enlisted in the Z Men, ostensibly an elite unit guarding atomic secrets but in reality a ragtag group of reservists, retreads, and others of marginal (at best) competence. The spies kidnap an adjutant newly assigned to the camp and one of them then impersonates him to gain entry to Camp Warwell.

The post's commander, Colonel Bloodnok, has been assigned for security purposes a supposed "daughter" who is actually a female MI5 operative. Harry soon becomes smitten with the "daughter", and they work together to foil an attempt by the secret agents to purloin Pureheart's formula.

== Title ==
National Service in Britain in the 1950s obliged all fit British men to serve in the military for two years, and thereafter three and a half years in the reserves. "Category Z" was one of the classes of reserve organisation. During the Korean War there was much apprehension that, in order to supply enough troops, the government might remobilize "Z-men" who had been released after their two years in uniform.

As the letter "Z" is pronounced as "Zed" in Received Pronunciation, the title is also a pun on a traditional drinking song, "Down Among the Dead Men".

== Cast ==
- Harry Secombe as Harry Jones
- Michael Bentine as Prof. Osrick Pureheart
- Spike Milligan as Pte. Eccles
- Peter Sellers as Colonel Bloodnok
- Carole Carr as Carole Gayley
- The Television Toppers as dancers
- Clifford Stanton as Stanton
- Robert Cawdron as Sergeant Bullshine
- Andrew Timothy as Captain Evans
- Graham Stark as Spider
- Russ Allen as Brigadier's ADC
- Elizabeth Kearns as girl in shop
- Miriam Karlin as woman in shop
- Sidney Vivian as landlord
- Eunice Gayson as officer's wife

== Production ==
Down Among the Z Men is the only film starring all four Goons (Bentine was absent from Penny Points to Paradise (1951)). In the film, Bentine, Milligan and Sellers repeated their radio characters, whereas Secombe's Neddy Seagoon was replaced with a less-raucous Harry Jones.

The film was shot at the Maida Vale Studios in London, with sets designed by art director Don Russell. The production had a two-week shooting schedule. Milligan, who wrote most of the radio scripts for the Goons, had no role in creating the film's screenplay. Bentine would later tell an interviewer that the film's lack of financing required director Maclean Rogers to only permit one take per scene. Rogers, however, incorporated two dance numbers into the film featuring showgirls as female soldiers practising for a talent show.

== Release ==
The film was not a commercial success in Great Britain. Since the Goons were unknown in the United States at the time, there was no theatrical release to the American market. Years later, after Sellers became a major film star, bootleg 16 mm prints of the film began to turn up in the US, sometimes under the new title The Goon Show Movie.

== Reception ==
On the film's release Monthly Film Bulletin wrote: "The producers of this film say they “have the misfortune to inflict The Goons upon us” and this statement, like the rest of the film, is chiefly intended to be funny. For good measure, there is also a music hall sketch by Michael Bentine (quite amusing), and several song and dance numbers with Carole Carr and twelve W.R.A.C. chorines.”

In British Sound Films David Quinlan wrote: ''Crazy comedy with musical interludes introduces ‘Goons’; could have done with their radio scriptwriters.''

The Radio Times Guide to Films gave the film 1/5 stars, writing: "Although Peter Sellers, Harry Seacombe and Spike Milligan co-starred in Penny Points to Paradise (1951), this is the only time that all four founders of The Goon Show appeared together on celluloid. However, Michael Bentine’s turn as mad professor is just one of many space-fillers in this dismal army romp. Gone is the zany humour that made the radio show essential listening and, in its place, comes crude slapstick."

Kim Newman, writing in Empire, said: "A series of comedy sketches padded out with the odd song 'n' dance number does not a film make. This gives little idea of the extent of the Goons' talent."
