= The Awakening (1954 film) =

1954 British TV film by Michael McCarthy

- Directed by: Michael McCarthy
- Screenplay by: Lawrence B. Marcus as Larry Marcus
- Based on: original story by Nikolai Gogol
- Produced by: Lance Comfort
- Starring: Buster Keaton; James Hayter
- Cinematography: Kenneth Talbot
- Music by: Bretton Byrd
- Release dates: 14 July 1954 (US); 29 February 1956 (UK)
- Running time: 26 minutes
- Country: UK/US
- Language: English

The Awakening is a 1954 short British TV drama film directed by Michael McCarthy and starring Buster Keaton. The screenplay was by Lawrence B. Marcus based on Nikolai Gogol's short story "The Overcoat". It was part of the Douglas Fairbanks Presents anthology series.

The Man is a first dramatic role of Buster Keaton. Fairbanks says, "It struck me as a beautiful idea as a novel idea as to put him in a straight part, because he was such a beautiful actor and a great talent. It worked out very well; he gave a marvelous performance".

The original plot of Gogol's story is significantly changed. There are allusions to George Orwell's Nineteen Eighty-Four dystopia in the film.

== Cast ==
- Buster Keaton as The Man
- James Hayter as The Chief
- Carl Jaffe as The Tailor
- Lynne Cole as The Girl
- Geoffrey Keen as The Supervisor
- Christopher Lee as The Thief
- Douglas Fairbanks Jr. as himself – Host
- Lily Kann as The Landlady (uncredited)
