= Jane Griffiths (actress) =

English actress (1929–1975)

- Born: 16 October 1929; Peacehaven, Sussex, England, UK
- Died: 11 June 1975 (aged 45); London, England, UK

Jane Mary Griffiths (16 October 1929 – 11 June 1975) was an English actress who appeared in theatre, film and television between 1950 and 1966.

== Career ==
In 1952 Griffiths appeared in the West End in Raymond Massey's play Hanging Judge.

She played the female lead opposite Gregory Peck in The Million Pound Note (1954), but never appeared in another major film, and spent the rest of her career in B movies. Film historians Steve Chibnall and Brian McFarlane praised her "unexpectedly poignant" performance in The Durant Affair, in which she evokes "a convincing air of struggling to contain past sadness".

== Filmography ==
- Double Confession (1950)
- The Gambler and the Lady (1952)
- The Million Pound Note (1954)
- The Green Scarf (1954)
- Shadow of a Man (1956)
- The Traitor (1957)
- Three Sundays to Live (1957)
- Tread Softly Stranger (1958)
- The Impersonator (1961)
- The Third Alibi (1961)
- The Durant Affair (1962)
- Dead Man's Evidence (1962)
- The Double (1963)
