= Green Room Club =

Club in London

Coordinates: 51°30′35.14″N 0°7′20.49″W

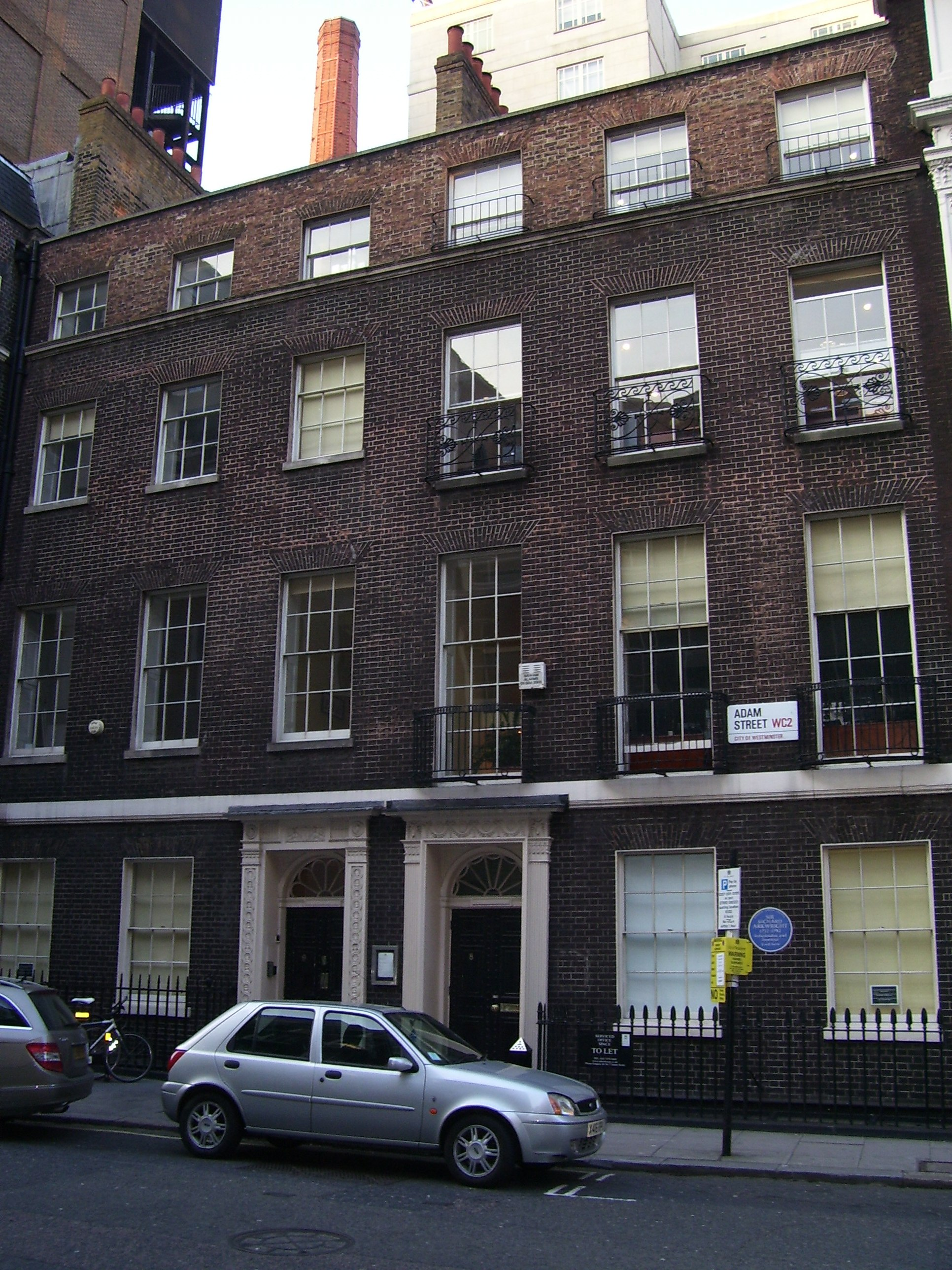
The last, and most enduring, of the buildings to house the Green Room Club – 8-9 Adam Street

The Green Room Club was a London-based club, primarily for actors, but also for lovers of theatre, arts and music. It was established in 1877 (149 years ago) in a restaurant in Piccadilly Circus, and moved to premises on Adam Street in 1955, where it remained until its closure in 2004 (22 years ago).

The club's name was not trademarked, and there have been at least two attempts to "re-found" a version of the club in new premises.

== History ==
The club was set up by the Victorian actor-manager Sir Henry Irving, and Henry Somerset, 8th Duke of Beaufort, with the latter agreeing to be its first president. Its inaugural meeting was on 21 July 1877, in the Criterion Restaurant, Piccadilly Circus, with those present then walking over to the club's first premises in the Caledonian Hotel at 10 Adelphi Terrace, near Strand. The club was to remain here for the next six years.

When the club's lease in the Caledonian Hotel expired in 1883, new premises were bought at 20 Bedford Street (off Strand), with the club temporarily relocating to 22 King Street (near Covent Garden), whilst repairs were carried out.

After the Duke of Beaufort's death in 1899, Sir Squire Bancroft took over as club president. It was around this time that the club's membership – now at 400 – realised that they needed a larger set of premises, and so in 1903 the club moved once more, leasing the first floor of 46 Leicester Square from the Automobile Association. The club remained here until it was hit by a Luftwaffe bomb on 16 October 1940. Offered temporary facilities by the Royal Societies Club in St. James's Street, the Green Room took to leasing rooms in Whitcomb Street, in the hope of one day renovating the Leicester Square rooms and moving back there. In the event, this never happened.

Instead, on 28 June 1955 it moved to the premises, the basement of 8-9 Adam Street. These rooms were extremely cramped, with members fondly recalling a bar designed for twenty people which often had to accommodate over a hundred. Peter Ustinov once described talking at the club at a Guest Lunch was "like addressing sailors in a submarine". A feature which many visitors often commented on were the club's small, darkened vaults, its full size Victorian snooker table and its wood panelled library.

In 1993 the club opened its doors to evening members paying £10 a year. Its first big influx of members came from the cast of Sunset Boulevard which had recently opened at The Adelphi Theatre. Up until its closure at Adam Street the club had had over 6000 members come through its doors.

By 1999, with the club's daytime membership dwindling, it was reported that it was in serious financial trouble, and the club was taken to court by the owner of its premises for failure to pay several months of rent. The club lost the case and moved out to a new premises in the old Mercers Arms building opposite the stage door of the Cambridge Theatre. Two small floors gave the club a home for a year but again when the lease ran out the club dissolved.

== Notable members ==
- George Arliss
- Sir Felix Aylmer
- Richard Attenborough
- Sir Squire Bancroft
- Henry Somerset, 8th Duke of Beaufort
- Sir Herbert Beerbohm Tree
- Ballard Berkeley (President of the club in the early 1980s)
- Sir Lewis Casson
- Alfred Cellier
- Noël Coward
- Alan Curtis
- Peter Davison
- John Drew
- Sir Gerald du Maurier
- Christopher Eccleston
- Ben Elton
- Sir Johnston Forbes-Robertson
- Ronald Fraser
- Harold French
- John Gielgud
- Nicholas Hannen
- Richard Harris
- Rex Harrison
- Jack Hawkins
- Tony Hawks
- Kit Hesketh-Harvey
- Roy Hudd
- Sir Henry Irving
- Morgan Jones
- Michael Kilgarriff
- Ian Lavender
- Ronald Leigh-Hunt
- Ralph Lynn
- Cal Macaninch
- Miles Malleson
- Raymond Massey
- Rik Mayall
- Henry McGee
- Jonny Lee Miller
- Gerard Murphy
- Laurence Olivier
- Peter O'Toole
- Ralph Richardson
- Sir C Aubrey Smith
- Bram Stoker
- William Terris
- Fred Terry
- Peter Ustinov
- Tom Walls
- Sir Charles Wyndham

== Legacy ==
Since its dissolution, there have been at least two unsuccessful attempts to "re-found" a version of the club in new premises, and the owner of the old building at Adam Street has re-opened the site as a new business venture, the Adam Street Club.

Upon discovering that the club's name was not copyrighted, Gary Stewart and Jean-Pierre Foster founded a group with the name on Romilly Street in Soho, in 2004.

Another club with the name was opened in 2009 in the bar of the Hotel Café Royal, with Joan Bozoky as its CEO and Chris Vinante as its director. As of 2017 the club meets at Foubert's Restaurant in Kensington High Street but is not running events. Bozoky's club has been involved in charitable fundraising events included Great Ormond Street Charity and the Helen Bamber Foundation with the participation of Emma Thompson and Emilia Fox. At the Helen Bamber Event the CEO Joan Bozoky donated the Famous Ring of Sir Henry Irving, founder of the club. Honorary members of Bozoky's club include Emilia Fox, Damian Lewis, and Patrick Stewart.

== See also ==
- List of gentlemen's clubs in London
- Green room
