= Operation Amsterdam =

1959 war film by Michael McCarthy

- Original cinema poster
- Directed by: Michael McCarthy
- Written by: John Eldridge; Michael McCarthy
- Based on: novel Adventure in Diamonds by David E. Walker.
- Produced by: Maurice Cowan
- Starring: Peter Finch; Eva Bartok; Tony Britton; Alexander Knox; Malcolm Keen
- Cinematography: Reginald Wyer
- Edited by: Arthur Stevens
- Music by: Philip Green
- Production companies: Maurice Cowan Productions & Rank Organisation
- Distributed by: Rank Organisation
- Release date: January 12, 1959 (UK)
- Running time: 104 minutes
- Country: United Kingdom
- Language: English

Operation Amsterdam is a 1959 black and white British action film, directed by Michael McCarthy, and featuring Peter Finch, Eva Bartok and Tony Britton. It is based on a true story as described in the book Adventure in Diamonds, by David E. Walker. The action of the story covers 12–13 May 1940 (Whit Sunday and Whit Monday) during the German invasion of the Netherlands. The composer Philip Green composed two original pieces of music for the film, the Pierement Waltz and the Amsterdam Polka.

== Plot ==
In May 1940, as the German invasion of the Netherlands is under way, the British government decides to send a team to the Netherlands on board HMS Walpole to secure stocks of industrial diamonds before the invaders can get to them.

According to this plan, two Dutch diamond experts, Jan Smit and Walter Keyser, with a British Army Intelligence officer, Major Dillon, are dropped by ship off the Dutch coast. They survive a German air raid and escape the attention of a suspicious Dutch policeman. Needing a car, they commandeer one driven by Anna, who is trying to commit suicide because she blames herself for the deaths of her Jewish fiance's parents. Anna turns out to be a member of the Dutch security forces and agrees to help the mission.

The four of them drive to Amsterdam where they meet Jan's father, Johan, at his diamond business house. Johan agrees to try to persuade other dealers to bring their diamonds later that day for transport to Britain. However, many of the stones are stored in a time-locked bank vault which cannot be opened for 24 hours because of the Whit Monday holiday, so they recruit Dillon's contacts, a Dutch resistance group, to break in.

Fifth columnist elements in the Dutch army launch an attack outside the bank but the group manage to break into the vault and recover the diamonds. Jan kills the leader of the fifth columnists, a Dutch army lieutenant. While the resistance fighters defend against the attack, the three agents and Anna make their escape. They drive back to the coast, dodging a German air attack on the way, but find that their boatmaster has been killed. They commandeer a tugboat to take them back to the waiting destroyer, but Anna elects to remain in the Netherlands and work with the nascent resistance movement.

== Cast ==
- Peter Finch as Jan Smit
- Eva Bartok as Anna
- Tony Britton as Major Dillon
- Alexander Knox as Walter Keyser
- Malcolm Keen as Johan Smit
- Petra Davies as Menschi (Johan's assistant)
- Alfred Burke as dealer working with Johan
- Christopher Rhodes as Alex (resistance leader)
- Peter Swanwick as Peter (safecracker)
- John Le Mesurier as Colonel Janssen (Anna's security force contact)
- Tim Turner as Dutch lieutenant (leader of fifth columnists)
- John Horsley as Commander Bowerman
- Melvyn Hayes as Willem
- Carl Jaffe as diamond merchant
- Keith Pyott as diamond merchant
- Oscar Quitak as diamond merchant
- Karel Štěpánek as diamond merchant
- Frederick Schiller as tugmaster
- George Pravda as portmaster
- John Bailey as suspicious Dutch police officer in port

== Production ==
The film was based on a true story. British intelligence smuggled out ten million pounds worth of industrial diamonds from Smit's Diamonds in Amsterdam. This was turned into a book Adventure in Diamonds by British journalist David Walker, which forms the basis of the film. Jan Schmidt, who Finch plays, was killed in 1946 and the character of Anna disappeared.

Peter Finch made the movie under his contract with the Rank organisation, which had started in 1954. Finch had been under suspension for repeatedly turning down roles and agreed to make the film in part to finish his contract with Rank. He had just made The Nun's Story for Warner Brs.

According to Tony Britton, who co-starred, Finch was unhappy with the movie and offered Britton the choice of either lead as he felt "it's all the same to me. Get the bloody film over and let me off the hook."

Filming started 7 July 1958. It was shot at Pinewood Studios and on location in Amsterdam. Peter Finch told the press during filming: "I like my part in the film, it is one of my strongest". The film was one of several made by Rank around this time set in foreign countries with European co stars.

== Release ==
The film had its world premiere in January 1959 attended by the star, director, John Davis and his wife, the Dutch Ambassador, and the brother of the real Jan Smit. It went into general release the following month.

== Reception ==
=== Box office ===
In January 1959 Josh Billings of Kinematograph Weekly reported the film "received scant space in the national papers, but those critics who did find the time to see it and room to review it were decidedly favourable. Personally, I thought the film grand “war fare” and am happy to record that it’s drawing crowded houses to the Leicester Square Theatre. If it doesn’t click on release I'm a Dutchman!" The following month Billings wrote the movie "received a somewhat patronising press but plunged into the money at the start and definitely beat the weather. I really fancied its chances and so help me I was right."

In April 1959 Variety listed the film as among the "handy product" released by Rank.

In December 1959 Kinematograph Weekly claimed the film "did well" at the box office although it did not list it among the movies that performed "better than average" for the year.

=== Critical ===
Variety said it had "plenty of excitement... a well-conceived and smoothly holding piece of film making". The Guardian called it "an unusually effective war film, partly because it is so largely true, partly because its scene... is so eerie and unfamiliar".

The film was one of seven Rank films bought for distribution in the US by 20th Century Fox. The others were Upstairs and Downstairs, Sink the Bismarck!, Northwest Frontier, Ferry to Hong Kong, The Wind Cannot Read and The Captain's Table.

Variety reviewed the film again in April 1960 for its American release calling it "a doubtful commodity on this side of the Atlantic... a fairly exciting World War II suspense yarn, but it’s too long for comfortable lower-berth siatus, and too weak on several vital counts to aspire to greater heights in the domestie market. It appears to be a near miss.".

The New York Times said "a surprisingly lukewarm drama has been culled from this tingling, true-life incident... Although it offers some fine tense panoramas of its doomed background, the picture remains curiously conventional in size and scope.... Not until the finale does the picture really get off its haunches. There are two consistent assets, one being a crisp, direct performance by Mr. Britton, as the realistic leader of the daring trio. First, last and always, there is Amsterdam itself."

Filmink wrote "The movie had a terrific premise... but is done in by slack handling from director Michael McCarthy."

Director Michael McCarthy died on 7 May 1959.
