= Betrayed (1954 film) =

1954 film by Gottfried Reinhardt

- Promotional movie poster for the film
- Directed by: Gottfried Reinhardt
- Written by: Ronald Millar; George Froeschel
- Starring: Clark Gable; Lana Turner; Victor Mature; Louis Calhern; Wilfrid Hyde-White
- Cinematography: Freddie Young
- Edited by: John D. Dunning; Raymond Poulton
- Music by: Walter Goehr; Bronislau Kaper
- Production company: Metro-Goldwyn-Mayer
- Distributed by: Metro-Goldwyn-Mayer
- Release date: September 7, 1954
- Country: United States
- Language: English
- Budget: $1.6 million
- Box office: $4.1 million

Betrayed is a 1954 American Eastmancolor war drama film starring Clark Gable, Lana Turner, Victor Mature, and Louis Calhern. Directed by Gottfried Reinhardt, the film's screenplay was by Ronald Millar and George Froeschel, its musical score was by Walter Goehr and Bronislau Kaper, and cinematography was by Freddie Young. The picture, Gable's last for Metro-Goldwyn-Mayer, was filmed on location in the Netherlands and England, and was based on the story of turncoat Dutch resistance leader Christiaan Lindemans, also known as "King Kong". The supporting cast features O. E. Hasse, Wilfrid Hyde-White, Ian Carmichael, Niall MacGinnis, and Theodore Bikel. Betrayed was the fourth and final movie in which Gable played opposite Turner, and their third pairing set during World War II.

Diana Coupland provided Turner's singing voice in the song "Johnny Come Home".

Betrayed was spoofed in the film Top Secret! (1984).

== Plot ==
Colonel Pieter Deventer is an intelligence agent of the exiled Dutch government, working to liberate his homeland from Nazi occupiers during World War II. He is discovered by a German signals operation targeting him and captured while making his final broadcast.

He is courted by the top German officer involved, also a colonel, who tries to entice him to become a double agent. As the two play cat and mouse over the prospect, a raid is mounted on the strongpoint by a Dutch resistance force, led by a flamboyant leader known as "The Scarf". Deventer is freed and kept in hiding by the Scarf.

The Nazis execute three prominent local Dutch figures in retaliation, and Deventer escapes successfully to England. He divides his time between secret missions in the Netherlands and trips back to England to consult his superiors and a British general. While in England he is ordered to keep an eye on Carla Van Oven, a beautiful socialite whose wealthy older husband was one of the three slain hostages. For some time she has been suspected of collaborating with the Germans.

Van Oven is recruited into the Dutch underground by Deventer on behalf of the British, and the pair fall in love. As agent "Fran Saylors", she is assigned to use her feminine charms to gain the confidence of Nazi officers and gather information. Soon a Nazi favorite, she is entertaining a gathering of officers at a lavish dinner party when the Scarf and his men stage a deadly raid.

The pair grow close, and the Scarf takes her to meet his beloved mother. He is shocked and appalled to find she has had her hair shaved off for collaborating with the Nazis.

Previously fiercely independent, he acquiesces to operating under British control, with Van Oven as liaison. Within the next few weeks, however, a considerable number of underground operatives are captured and killed when ambushed during sabotage missions.

Van Oven is identified as the prime suspect for being a traitor to the resistance cause. This weighs on Deventer's heart, who recognizes he must eliminate her.

Ultimately, Allied troops and the local resistance begin to turn the tide against the Nazis. Deventer arrives at the Scarf's secret hideaway and learns that he has been wounded in an exchange, captured, and taken to a German field hospital behind the lines. He places Van Oven under arrest, pending her execution for treason. Meanwhile, suspicious, Deventer lays a trap for the Scarf. He rescues him from the Germans, then tricks him into revealing his duplicity in a gambit proposed to rescue British soldiers trapped at Arnheim. Outed, the Scarf is shot dead while trying to escape. Van Oven, who had been freed through Deventer's ruse, turns up safe with the escaped British troops, and the two lovers are reunited.

== Cast ==
- Clark Gable as Colonel Pieter Deventer
- Lana Turner as Carla Van Oven
- Victor Mature as "The Scarf"
- Louis Calhern as General Ten Eyck
- O. E. Hasse as Colonel Helmuth Dietrich
- Wilfrid Hyde-White as General Charles Larraby
- Ian Carmichael as Captain Jackie Lawson
- Niall MacGinnis as "Blackie"
- Nora Swinburne as "The Scarf's" Mother
- Roland Culver as General Warsleigh
- Leslie Weston as "Pop"
- Christopher Rhodes as Chris
- Lily Kann as Jan's Grandmother
- Brian Smith as Jan
- Anton Diffring as Captain Von Stanger
- Carl Jaffe as Major Plaaten
- Richard Anderson as John
- Peter Martin as Freddy Jackson
- Mona Washbourne as Waitress
- Thomas Heathcote as Paratrooper Corporal
- Glyn Houston as Paratrooper Corporal
- Theodore Bikel as German Sergeant
- Wolf Frees as Motorcycle Rider
- Ferdy Mayne as Luftwaffe Officer

== Production ==
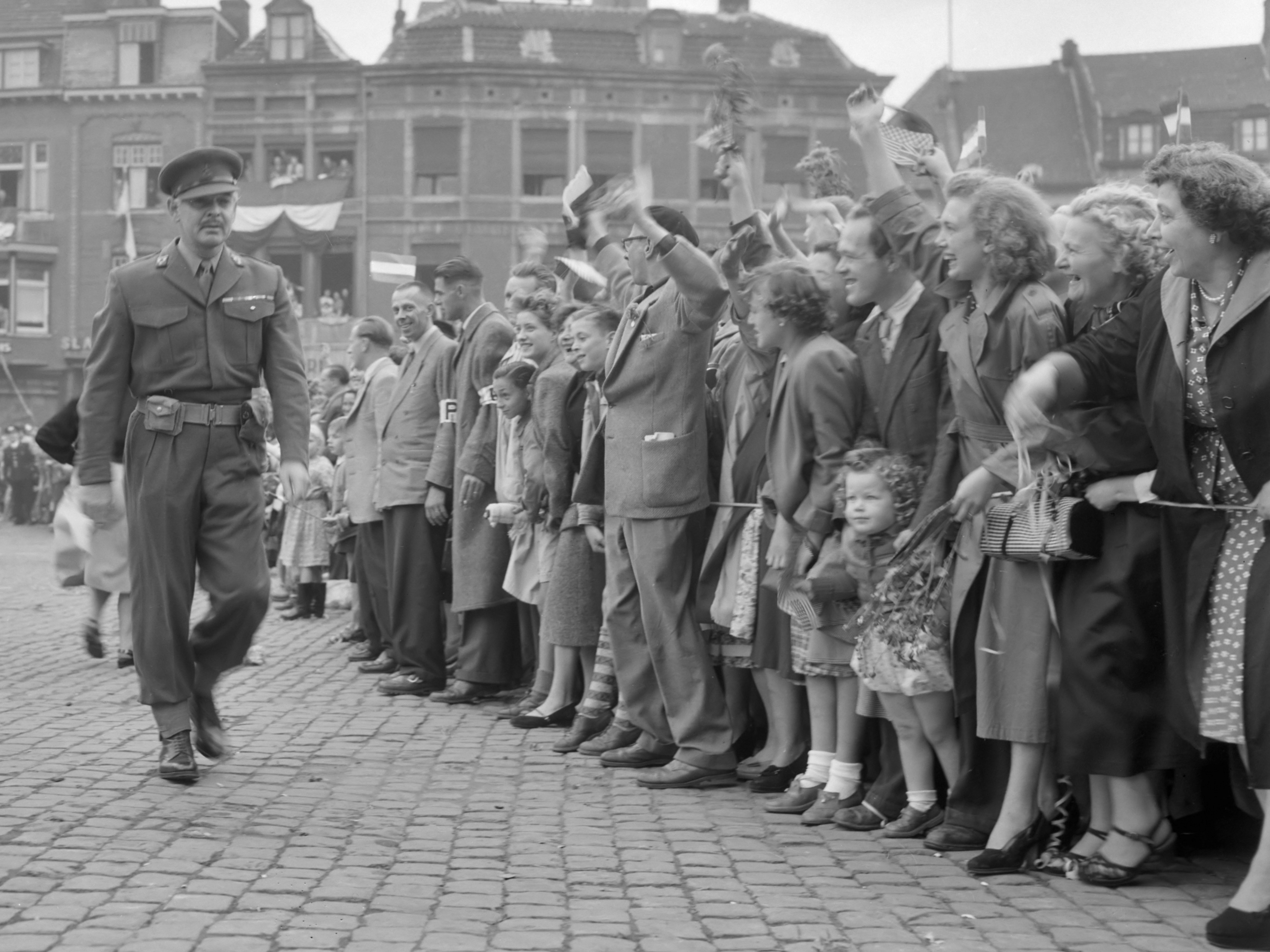
Shooting of a scene for Betrayed in Maastricht. Clark Gable walks past a crowd (1953)

The film was initially titled as The True and the Brave, with Kirk Douglas mentioned as a possible star. Richard Widmark was at one time considered for the part played by Victor Mature. Ava Gardner was to play the female lead, but was eventually replaced by Lana Turner.

Filming took place in late 1953 and early 1954, on location in Holland and England. Some shooting took place around Maastricht in Limburg. The interiors were shot at MGM's Elstree Studios near London. The film's sets were designed by the art director Alfred Junge.

It was the final film Gable made for MGM under his contract, which ended in March 1954. He worked as an independent for the remainder of his career. His next two films were released by 20th Century Fox.

== Release ==
=== Box office ===
According to MGM records, the film earned $1,966,000 in the U.S. and Canada, and $2,211,000 in other markets, resulting in a profit of $821,000.

=== Critical reception ===
In a 1954 review in The New York Times, critic Bosley Crowther wrote: "By the time this picture gets around to figuring out whether the betrayer is Miss Turner or Mr. Mature, it has taken the audience through such a lengthy and tedious amount of detail that it has not only frayed all possible tension, but it has aggravated patience as well. Miss Turner and Mr. Gable have had many long-winded talks; Mr. Mature has thumped his chest like Tarzan and bellowed his boasts a score of times. An excess of espionage maneuvering has been laid out on the screen. The beauties of the countryside of the Netherlands have been looked at until they pall."

=== Home media ===
Betrayed was released on DVD and digital download on March 23, 2009, as part of the Warner Archive.
