= Paul Carpenter (actor) =

Canadian actor and singer (1921–1964)

- Born: Patrick Paul Lane Charpentier; 8 December 1921; Montreal, Quebec, Canada
- Died: 12 June 1964 (aged 42); Vaudeville Theatre, London, England
- Years active: 1946–1964
- Spouses: Pauline Black (m. 1947; div. 1953); Kim Parker (m. 1955; div. 1958)

Paul Carpenter (born Patrick Paul Lane Charpentier; 8 December 1921 – 12 June 1964) was a Canadian actor and singer.

== Life and career ==
Carpenter originally attended medical school in Montreal, but left aged 17 to join the Canadian Broadcasting Corporation as a war correspondent. He also played professional hockey in Canada.

He moved to Britain and sang with Ted Heath and His Music in the 1940s and starred in the BBC Radio serial Riders of the Range (1949–1953) as the cowboy Jeff Arnold, where he shared the billing with his dog, Rustler (played by Percy Edwards).

As a movie actor he "made over three dozen British films in the post-war decades, most of them 'B' pictures, such as Diplomatic Passport (1954) and One Jump Ahead (1955), to which he brought an easy, likeable authority that seemed more difficult for British actors to achieve". His voice was so mellifluous, he would often be cast as announcers. His final (uncredited) film appearance was in the 1964 James Bond film Goldfinger where he played an American General escorting James Bond.

During 1955-1956, he starred in his only television programme, Sailor of Fortune with Lorne Greene.

== Death ==
During rehearsals for the play The First Fish by Frank Tarloff at the Vaudeville Theatre, London, with a cast that included Moira Lister, Louie Ramsay and Ray Barrett, Carpenter arrived at the theatre and asked to be helped to a dressing room as he felt unwell. The director, Charles Ross, and the other actors were unaware he was at the theatre. He was found dead alone in the dressing room three hours later. He had recently recovered from injuries suffered in a car accident.

== Partial filmography ==
Selected film appearances
Year	Title	Role	Notes
1946	This Man Is Mine	—	Uncredited
1946	School for Secrets	Flt. Lt. Argylle	—
1948	Uneasy Terms	Windy Nicholls	—
1949	The Third Man	International Patrol D	Uncredited
1949	Landfall	F/O Morgan	—
1953	Albert R.N.	Fred	—
1954	Face the Music	Johnny Sutherland	—
1954	The Weak and the Wicked	Joe, Babs' boyfriend	—
1954	Night People	Eddie Whitby	—
1954	The House Across the Lake	Vincent Gordon	—
1954	The Diamond	Mickey Sweeney	Uncredited
1954	Johnny on the Spot	Paul Carrington	—
1954	Five Days	Paul Kirby	—
1954	Duel in the Jungle	Pan American Airways Clerk	—
1954	A Stranger Came Home	Bill Saul	—
1954	Diplomatic Passport	Ray Anderson	—
1954	The Young Lovers	Gregg Pearson	—
1954	The Sea Shall Not Have Them	Lt Patrick Boyle, Sea Otter Pilot	—
1954	Mask of Dust	Racetrack Announcer	Uncredited
1954	The Red Dress	Hannibal Jones	Segment: "Meet Mr. Jones"
1954	The Last Moment	Derwent	Segment: "The Last Moment"
1955	Shadow of a Man	Gene Landers	—
1955	One Jump Ahead	Paul Banner	—
1955	The Hornet's Nest	Bob Bartlett	—
1955	Doctor at Sea	Captain	Uncredited
1955	Stock Car	Larry Duke	—
1956	The Narrowing Circle	Dave Nelson	—
1956	Women Without Men	Nick Randall	UK version. U.S. title: Blonde Bait
1956	The Iron Petticoat	Major Lewis	—
1956	Reach for the Sky	Hall	Uncredited
1956	Fire Maidens from Outer Space	Capt. Larson	—
1956	Behind the Headlines	Paul Banner	—
1956	The Battle of the River Plate	American reporter in Uruguay	Uncredited
1956	Action Stations	Bob Reynolds	—
1957	No Road Back	Clem Hayes	—
1957	Murder Reported	Jeff Holly	Reporter
1957	The Hypnotist	Valentine Neal	—
1957	Les Espions	Le Colonel Howard	—
1958	Undercover Girl	Johnny Carter	—
1958	Intent to Kill	O'Brien	—
1959	Jet Storm	George Towers	—
1959	Date at Midnight	Bob Dillon	—
1960	Wernher von Braun	Launch Countdown Coordinator	Uncredited
1960	Surprise Package	Television News Broadcaster	Uncredited
1962	Jacktown	Policeman No. 1	—
1963	Panic	Fight Commentator	—
1963	Call Me Bwana	Col. Spencer	—
1963	Dr. Crippen	Bruce Martin	—
1963	Maigret Sees Red	Harry McDonald	—
1964	The Beauty Jungle	American Tourist	Uncredited
1964	First Men in the Moon	Reporter from the 'Express'	Uncredited
1964	Goldfinger	US General at airport	Uncredited – final film role
