= Conrad Phillips =

British actor (1925–2016)

- Born: Conrad Philip Havord; 13 April 1925; Lambeth, London, England
- Died: 13 January 2016 (aged 90); Chippenham, Wiltshire, England
- Occupation: Actor
- Years active: 1946–1991
- Spouses: Jean Moir (m. 1949–1966); Jennie Slatter (m. 1968)
- Children: 3

Conrad Philip Havord (13 April 1925 – 13 January 2016), known professionally as Conrad Phillips, was an English television and film actor. He is best known for playing William Tell in the adventure series The Adventures of William Tell (1958–1959).

== Life and career ==
Phillips was born Conrad Philip Havord in London, the son of Horace Havord, who was a journalist and a writer of detective stories. Conrad attended St John's Bowyer School, Clapham, in south London, then worked for an insurance company.

Phillips altered his date of birth on his ration book so that he could join the Royal Navy at the age of 17. In his three years of service during the Second World War, he saw action in the Atlantic Ocean, the Mediterranean Sea and the North Sea, and survived the mining of a landing craft.

Phillips called himself Bill in the Navy because his shipmates kept ridiculing the name Conrad. He did not adopt the name Conrad Phillips until he started acting. His father had used the name for some of the thrillers he wrote and suggested that his son use it as his stage name. In his autobiography, Aiming True, Conrad wrote that he regretted doing so.

Phillips studied at RADA, and then appeared in repertory theatre and in the West End. He is probably best known for portraying William Tell in the popular ITV television series The Adventures of William Tell, which ran for 39 episodes from 1958 to 1959. He was in a wheelchair during the filming of the last episode of the series because he had broken his ankle on location. Even the fighting shots were done in this way. He also played Tell's mentor Stefan in Crossbow in 1987. Severe back pain, two replacement knees and a replacement hip brought an end to his career, and he retired in 1991.

Phillips met his second wife, Jennie, in April 1968. In January 1972, they set about restoring a Scottish hill farm called Skeoch. They eventually went to live in Chippenham, Wiltshire.

Phillips published his autobiography, Aiming True, in 2013.

Phillips died at his home in Chippenham on 13 January 2016, at the age of 90.

== Other TV appearances ==
- The Adventures of the Scarlet Pimpernel (1956) episode 17 – Gentlemen of the Road. Character – Latour.
- “The Adventures of Robin Hood” (1956) The Shell Game. Character - A soldier.
- The Invisible Man – Series 2, Episode 12 – Shadow Bomb (1961). Character – Captain Finch.
- Richard the Lionheart (1961–62 TV series) – episode 21 – A Marriage of Convenience (1962). Character – Guy.
- The Avengers (1966) episode – Silent Dust. Character – Mellors.
- Callan (1967) episode – Jack on Top. Character – Wilson.
- The Prisoner (1967) episode – "The General"
- UFO (1971) episode – Reflections in the Water. Character – Skipper.
- Fawlty Towers (1975) episode – The Wedding Party. Character – Mr Lloyd
- Cribb (1980) episode – Mad Hatter's Holiday. Character – Dr. Prothero
- The Return of Sherlock Holmes (1985) episode – The Abbey Grange. Character – Sir Eustace Brackenstall
- Hannay (1989) episode - Double Jeopardy. Character – Dirk Huysman.

Other TV shows: The Capone Investment, The Count of Monte Cristo, The New Adventures of Charlie Chan, The Newcomers (recurring character – Robert Malcolm), Sutherland's Law, Howards' Way, Never the Twain, The Gaffer, Sorry! and Emmerdale Farm (recurring character – Dr Christopher Meadows from 1981 to 1986). Mini-series: Into the Labyrinth and The Master of Ballantrae.

== Selected filmography ==
- A Song for Tomorrow (1948) – Lieutenant Fenton
- The Temptress (1949) – Captain Green
- Lilli Marlene (1950) – Security Officer
- The Last Page (1952) – Detective Todd (uncredited)
- It Started in Paradise (1952) – 1st Photographer (uncredited)
- Three Steps to the Gallows (1953) – Clerk – Travel Agent (uncredited)
- Mantrap (1953) – Barker
- The Diamond (1954) – Policeman (uncredited)
- Johnny on the Spot (1954) – Police Sergeant (uncredited)
- The Secret Tent (1956) – Detective Sergeant
- The Last Man to Hang (1956) – Dr. Mason
- Circus Friends (1956) – Larry
- The Battle of the River Plate (1956) – Lt. Washbourne – Gunnery Officer, HMS Achilles (uncredited)
- Zarak (1956) – Johnson – Young Officer
- A Question of Adultery (1958) – Mario
- The White Trap (1959) – Sgt. Morrison
- Witness in the Dark (1959) – Inspector Coates
- The Desperate Man (1959) – Curtis
- Circus of Horrors (1960) – Insp. Arthur Ames
- Sons and Lovers (1960) – Baxter Dawes
- The Fourth Square (1961) – Bill Lawrence
- No Love for Johnnie (1961) – Drake
- The Secret Partner (1961) – Dr. Alan Richford
- The Shadow of the Cat (1961) – Michael Latimer
- Murder, She Said (1961) – Harold
- A Guy Called Caesar (1962) – Tony
- The Durant Affair (1962) – Julian Armour
- Dead Man's Evidence (1962) – David Baxter
- Don't Talk to Strange Men (1962) – Ron
- Impact (1963) – Jack Moir
- The Switch (1963) – John Curry
- Heavens Above! (1963) – P.R.O.
- Stopover Forever (1964) – Eric Cunningham
- Dateline Diamonds (1965) – Tom Jenkins
- The Murder Game (1965) – Peter Shanley
- Who Killed the Cat? (1966) – Inspector Bruton
- The Ghost of Monk's Island (1967) – Eli Oakes.
