= Forces' Sweetheart (film) =

1953 British film by Maclean Rogers

- Directed by: Maclean Rogers
- Screenplay by: Maclean Rogers; Michael Bentine
- Produced by: E.J. Fancey
- Starring: Hy Hazell; Harry Secombe; Michael Bentine
- Edited by: Peter Mayhew
- Music by: Wilfred Burns (uncredited)
- Production company: E.J. Fancey Productions
- Distributed by: New Realm Pictures
- Release date: November 1953
- Running time: 76 minutes
- Country: United Kingdom
- Language: English

Forces' Sweetheart is a 1953 British comedy film directed by Maclean Rogers and starring Hy Hazell, Harry Secombe and Michael Bentine. It was written by Rogers and Bentine. Two gormless soldiers become infatuated with a female entertainer.

== Plot ==
Recently arrived back home from entertaining British troops in Korea, forces sweetheart Judy James meets with her agent, who has arranged a West End show centred on her and funded by an eccentric English chewing gum magnate Aloysius Dimwitty. Meanwhile, both fantasising that Judy is their fiancée, Flight Lieutenant John Robinson and Private Harry Llewellyn make their way to London to try to meet her. Just before the pair arrive, her actual boyfriend, Lieutenant John Robinson of the Royal Navy, arranges a meeting with her. This allows Llewellyn (who had previously unwittingly decided on the pseudonym Lieutenant John Robinson) and the Flight Lieutenant to be mistaken for their namesake and thus bluff their way into meeting Judy.

Dimwitty leaves abruptly to go back to back to his Scottish castle and – fearing his funding for the show is lost – Llewellyn and the Flight Lieutenant go in pursuit. It emerges that Dimwitty had simply gone north to attend a wedding and he is soon back in London organising a boxing match as a 'first half closer' for the show. Judy's boyfriend proposes to her on the show's opening night, disappointing Llewellyn and the Flight Lieutenant. However, Judy informs the pair that she is one of triplets, the other two of which appear behind Llewellyn and the Flight Lieutenant.

== Cast ==
- Hy Hazell as Judy James (and the other two of the triplets)
- Harry Secombe as Harry Llewellyn
- Michael Bentine as John Robinson
- Freddie Frinton as Aloysius Dimwitty
- John Ainsworth as John Robinson
- Molly Weir as maid
- Adrienne Fancey as Audrey
- Kenneth Henry as Tommy Tupp
- Graham Stark as Simmonds
- John Fitzgerald as producer
- Michael McCarthy as plumber

== Critical reception ==
Monthly Film Bulletin said "This crudely made production has little to recommend it, due mainly to sheer technical inadequacy. Harry Secombe struggles hard to raise laughs, but is hampered by a wardrobe which consists of a tweed suit, black shirt and a corduroy cap – making him appear more alarming than humorous. Michael Bentine, hiding behind a giant moustache, does his best with material unworthy of his comic talents. An undistinguished comedy, well below the "Goon Show" standard."

In British Sound Films: The Studio Years 1928–1959 David Quinlan rated the film as "mediocre", writing: "Goon-style comedy struggles unsuccessfully to overcome shoddy production standards; very awkward."

The Radio Times Guide to Films gave the film 1/5 stars, writing: "Having starred witrh Peter Sellers and Spike Milligan in Down Among the Z Men the previous year, Harry Secombe and Michael Bentine re-team for this dismally unfunny uniform debacle. Hy Hazell is the object of everyone's attention, while comic Fredie Frinton has the few good lines there are."
