= Diplomatic Passport (film) =

1954 British film by Gene Martel

- Directed by: Gene Martel
- Written by: Paul Tabori
- Produced by: Roy Rich; Burt Balaban
- Starring: Marsha Hunt; Paul Carpenter; Henry Oscar; Honor Blackman
- Cinematography: James Wilson
- Edited by: Max Benedict
- Music by: Eric Spear
- Production companies: Rich and Rich Productions
- Distributed by: Eros Films
- Release date: 13 August 1954
- Running time: 78 minutes
- Country: United Kingdom
- Language: English

Diplomatic Passport is a 1954 British second feature ('B') thriller film directed by Gene Martel and starring Marsha Hunt, Paul Carpenter, Henry Oscar and Honor Blackman. It was written by Paul Tabori.

== Plot ==
An American diplomat and his wife arrive in London, and are soon involved in a series of confusing and sometimes frightening events.

== Cast ==
- Marsha Hunt as Judy Anderson
- Paul Carpenter as Ray Anderson
- Henry Oscar as The Chief
- Honor Blackman as Marcelle
- Marne Maitland as Philip
- John Bennett as André
- John McLaren as Jack Gordon
- Henry B. Longhurst as waiter
- John Welsh as embassy official
- George Murcell as cafe owner
- Cyril Smith as taxi driver
- David Conville as airline clerk
- William Dexter as airline clerk
- John Boxer as policeman

== Production ==
The film was made at MGM's Elstree Studios near London.

Marsha Hunt was blacklisted during the McCarthyite era of the early 1950s. and was obliged to seek work in the United Kingdom.

== Reception ==
The Monthly Film Bulletin wrote: "A sub-standard thriller, which takes its unlikely adventures a good deal too slowly. The fight scenes are staged with remarkably little imagination, so that the hero's predicament takes on a certain inadvertently amusing aspect."

Kine Weekly wrote: "Slapdash romantic crime melodrama. ... The principal players, headed by Paul Carpenter and Marsha Hunt, do their best to amuse and thrill, but fail to achieve the impossible and make something of the feeble, dishevelled script. The whole thing's incredibly amateurish. ... The picture not only tells a silly story but is carelessly staged. ... The dialogue, too, leaves much to be desired."

In British Sound Films: The Studio Years 1928–1959 David Quinlan rated the film as "poor", writing: "Visiting American Miss Hunt is more talented than most, but stands no chance against this plot, with its funny fight scenes and speeded-up chases."
