= Park Plaza 605 =

1953 British film by Bernard Knowles

- U.S. theatrical poster
- Directed by: Bernard Knowles
- Written by: Bertram Ostrer; Albert Fennell; Bernard Knowles; Clifford Witting (treatment)
- Based on: novel Dare-Devil Conquest by Berkeley Gray
- Produced by: Albert Fennell; Bertram Ostrer
- Starring: Tom Conway; Eva Bartok; Joy Shelton
- Cinematography: Eric Cross
- Edited by: Clifford Boote (as Cifford Boot)
- Music by: Philip Green
- Production companies: B & A Productions (as B & A Productions Limited)
- Distributed by: Eros Films
- Release date: December 1953 (UK)
- Running time: 75 minutes
- Country: United Kingdom
- Language: English

Park Plaza 605 (U.S. title: Norman Conquest) is a 1953 British second feature ('B') crime film directed by Bernard Knowles and starring Tom Conway, Eva Bartok, and Joy Shelton. It was written by Bertram Oster, Albert Fennell, Knowles and Clifford Witting based on the 1950 novel Dare-Devil Conquest by Edwy Searles Brookes (as Berkeley Gray).

== Plot ==
Private investigator Norman Conquest stumbles across a cryptic message being sent by carrier pigeon and his curiosity leads him to room 605 of the Park Plaza Hotel, where he meets a mysterious foreign blonde woman, and finds himself embroiled in a murder investigation with himself as the prime suspect.

== Cast ==
- Tom Conway as Norman Conquest
- Eva Bartok as Nadina Rodin
- Joy Shelton as Pixie Everard
- Sid James as Superintendent Bill Williams
- Richard Wattis as Theodore Feather
- Carl Jaffe as Boris Roff
- Frederick Schiller as Ivan Burgin
- Robert Adair as Baron von Henschel
- Anton Diffring as Gregor
- Ian Fleming as Colonel Santling
- Edwin Richfield as Mr Reynolds
- Michael Balfour as Ted Birston
- Martin Boddey as Stumpy
- Terence Alexander as hotel manager
- Victor Platt as taxi driver
- Leon Davey as Mandeville Livingstone
- Richard Marner as Barkov
- Tony Hilton as lift attendant
- Alan Rolfe as police inspector
- Derek Prentice as hall porter
- Frank Sieman as Captain Kramer
- Brian Moorehead as first mate
- Billie Hill as Mrs Pottle
- Anthony Woodruff as clerk

== Critical reception ==
The Monthly Film Bulletin wrote: "An Involved and indifferently made thriller; the actors give the impression that they have all been there before."

Radio Times called Park Plaza 605 a "fair British B-feature."

In British Sound Films: The Studio Years 1928–1959 David Quinlan rated the film as "mediocre", writing: "Indifferent thriller with tired performances."
