= The Traitor (1957 film) =

British film by Michael McCarthy

- British theatrical poster
- Directed by: Michael McCarthy
- Written by: Michael McCarthy
- Produced by: Edwin J. Fancey
- Starring: Donald Wolfit; Robert Bray; Jane Griffiths; Anton Diffring
- Cinematography: Bert Mason
- Edited by: Monica Kimick
- Music by: Jackie Brown
- Production company: Fantur Films
- Distributed by: New Realm Entertainment
- Release date: March 1957
- Running time: 88 minutes
- Country: United Kingdom
- Language: English

The Traitor (also known as The Accursed) is a 1957 British drama film directed and written by Michael McCarthy and starring Donald Wolfit, Robert Bray, Jane Griffiths and Anton Diffring.

== Premise ==
A former resistance fighter tries to discover the traitor who has betrayed his colleagues in the German resistance during the Second World War.

== Cast ==
- Donald Wolfit as Colonel Charles Price
- Robert Bray as Major Shane
- Jane Griffiths as Vicki Toller
- Carl Jaffe as Professor Stefan Toller
- Anton Diffring as Joseph Brezina
- Christopher Lee as Doctor Neumann
- Oscar Quitak as Thomas Rilke
- Karel Štěpánek as Mayor Friederich Suderman
- Frederick Schiller as Alfred Baum
- Rupert Davies as Clinton, the butler
- John Van Eyssen as Lieutenant Bobby Grant
- Colin Croft as Theodore Dehmel

== Theme music ==
The film's title music, "Prelude Without A Name", and incidental music were written and conducted by Jackie Brown. The solo pianist was Dennis Wilson.

== Critical reception ==
The Monthly Film Bulletin wrote: "Although there are some good ideas in the plot, the script of this film seems more suited to radio than to cinema, since it consists for the most part of a series of conversational set pieces. The director has made praiseworthy efforts to overcome this defect; but has not quite succeeded. Robert Bray's truculent American major is quite unconvincing; for the rest the cast is uninspired but adequate."

Kine Weekly wrote: "The director handles the plot intelligently and convincing atmosphere is created. Resourceful camerawork and an original musical score, strengthened by a new concerto, heighten dramatic impact."

Sky Movies wrote, "The specially written musical piece, Prelude, which has a vital part to play in the plot's unfolding, is hauntingly appealing. But too much talk tends to spoil the script's surprises."

The Radio Times noted, "Nuance was not Donald Wolfit's strong suit, but he had presence and power in spades. He totally dominates this story with a bluster and conviction that keeps an uninspiring tale of the hunt for a Second World War traitor from falling flat on its face."

In British Sound Films: The Studio Years 1928–1959 David Quinlan rated the film as "mediocre", writing: "Talky enough for a radio script, this drama drags on screen."

TV Guide concluded, "This is an offbeat espionage whodunit with some nervy moments."

== Around the film ==
- On a very similar plot line, the French filmmaker Julien Duvivier directed in 1959 Marie-Octobre, also known as Secret Meeting, starring Danielle Darrieux and based on a novel by Jacques Robert published in 1948.

== Bibliography ==
- Chibnall, Steve & McFarlane, Brian. The British 'B' Film. Palgrave MacMillan, 2009.
