= The Impersonator =

1961 British film by Alfred Shaughnessy

- Theatrical poster for 1962 continental release
- Directed by: Alfred Shaughnessy
- Written by: Kenneth Cavander; Alfred Shaughnessy
- Produced by: Anthony Perry
- Starring: John Crawford; Jane Griffiths
- Cinematography: John Coquillon
- Edited by: John Bloom
- Music by: De Wolfe
- Production companies: Eyeline Productions; Herald
- Distributed by: Bryanston Films (UK)
- Release date: May 1961 (UK)
- Running time: 64 minutes
- Country: United Kingdom
- Language: English
- Budget: £22,098

The Impersonator is a 1961 low-budget black and white British second feature thriller film directed by Alfred Shaughnessy starring John Crawford, Jane Griffiths, Patricia Burke and John Salew. It was written by Kenneth Cavander and Shaughnessy. An American angle was incorporated to give transatlantic box office appeal.

== Plot ==
In an effort to improve relations between a US air force base and the people of the small English town nearby, Airman Sergeant Jimmy Bradford organises a school trip to see the pantomime Mother Goose. He befriends the children's teacher, Ann Loring, but when he and she arrange to meet at a cafe and go on to a dance at the base, circumstances prevent them from meeting. Thinking Ann has stood him up, Bradford asks the cafe owner, a young widow, Mrs. Lloyd, to the dance instead. After the dance, Mrs. Lloyd is murdered in a local park. The police and the locals suspect Bradford, but Ann refuses to believe he is guilty. Mrs. Lloyd's young son, Tommy, who is one of Ann's pupils, unknowingly holds the vital clue to the murderer's identity.

== Cast ==
- John Crawford as Sgt. Jimmy Bradford
- Jane Griffiths as Ann Loring
- Patricia Burke as Mrs. Lloyd
- John Salew as Harry Walker
- John Dare as Tommy Lloyd
- John Arnatt as Detective Superintendent Fletcher
- Yvonne Ball as Principal Boy in "Mother Goose"
- Edmund Glover as Colonel
- Frank Thornton as Police Sergeant

== Production ==
The film was shot on a three-week schedule at Pinewood Studios and on location in Uxbridge. The pantomime sequences were filmed at the Metropolitan Theatre, Edgware Road, London, which was demolished in 1963.

== Critical reception ==
Monthly Film Bulletin said, "This is a neatly plotted thriller, partly location-made and managing, within its modest ambitions and running time, to tell its story concisely and on very acceptable human terms. Dialogue, details of staging and playing, the amused look at a provincial pantomime, are all that much fresher and livelier than usual, though the direction itself has only a journeyman adequacy. The Impersonator is a good start from a new company—a second feature which has been thought about and worked on and which shows it."

Writing in The Radio Times, David Parkinson gave the film two out of five stars, saying, "it's shoestring stuff, but still better than most British B-movies." Britmovie called the film an "excellent British B-thriller produced by Bryanston on a budget of £23,000 that is a cut above the majority of second features."

It was one of 15 films selected by Steve Chibnall and Brian McFarlane in The British 'B' Film, as among the most meritorious of the B films made in Britain between World War II and 1970. They called it "exceptionally proficient" and noted that the critics Penelope Gilliatt and Dilys Powell had also praised it at the time of its release.
