= Châteauneuf-Grasse =

Commune in Provence-Alpes-Côte d'Azur, France

Châteauneuf-Grasse Castèunòu de Grassa (Occitan)
- Commune
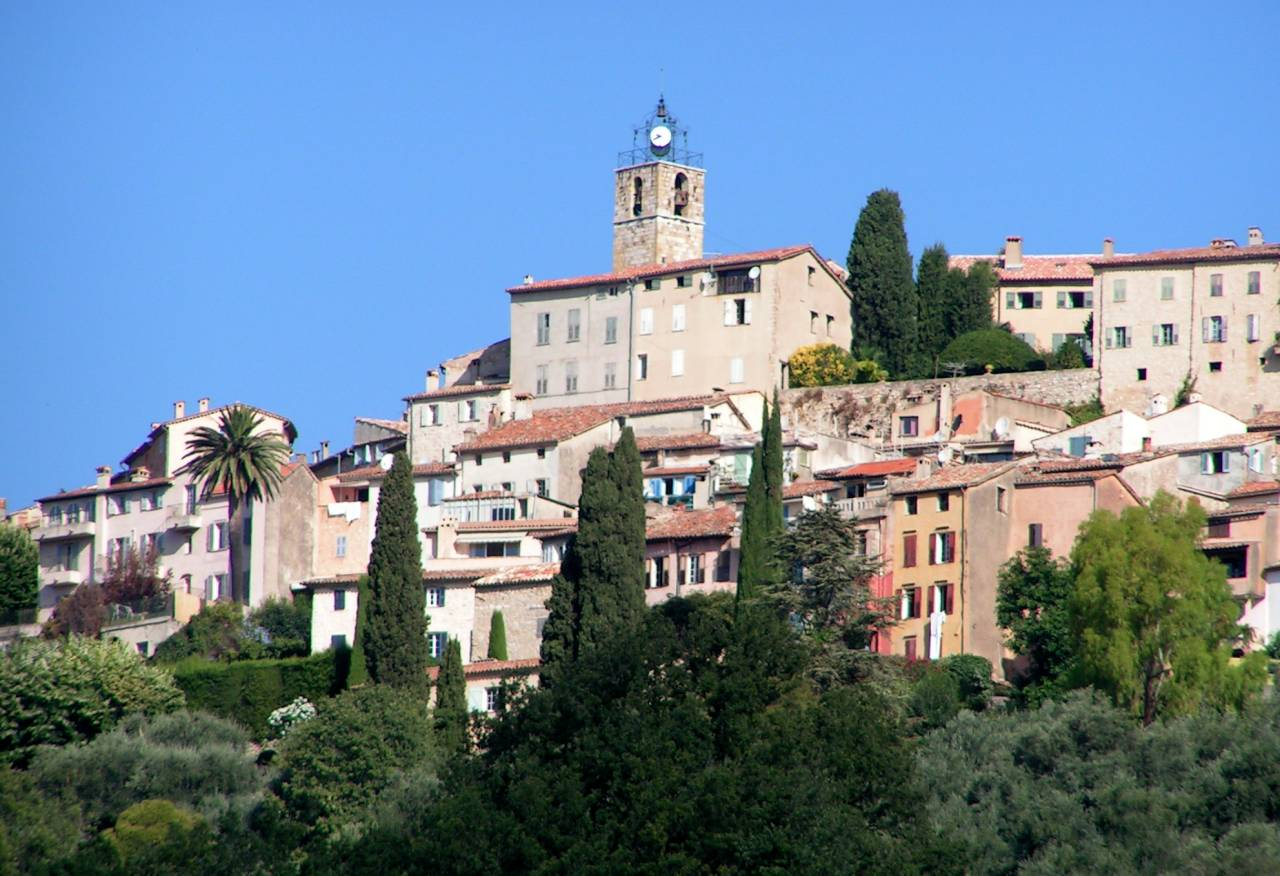
- The clock tower of the church of Saint-Martin in Châteauneuf-Grasse

- Coat of arms
- Location of Châteauneuf-Grasse
- Location within France Location within Provence-Alpes-Côte d'Azur
- Coordinates: 43°40′33″N 6°58′32″E
- Country: France
- Region: Provence-Alpes-Côte d'Azur
- Department: Alpes-Maritimes
- Arrondissement: Grasse
- Canton: Valbonne
- Intercommunality: CA Sophia Antipolis

Government
  - Mayor (2026–32): Emmanuel Delmotte
- Area^{1}: 8.95 km^{2} (3.46 sq mi)
- Highest elevation: 662 m (2,172 ft)
- Lowest elevation: 197 m (646 ft)
- Population (2023): 3,815
  - Density: 426/km^{2} (1,100/sq mi)
- Time zone: UTC+01:00 (CET)
  - Summer (DST): UTC+02:00 (CEST)
- INSEE/Postal code: 06038 /06740
- ^{1} French Land Register data, which excludes lakes, ponds, glaciers > 1 km^{2} (0.386 sq mi or 247 acres) and river estuaries.

Châteauneuf-Grasse (French: [ʃɑtonœf ɡʁas]; Occitan: Castèunòu de Grassa), alternatively known as names are Châteauneuf de Grasse or simply Châteauneuf, is a commune in the Alpes-Maritimes department in the Provence-Alpes-Côte d'Azur region in Southeastern France.

Châteauneuf-Grasse is situated on the French Riviera, just over 4 km (2.4 mi) from Grasse and 21 km (13 mi) from Cannes; it borders the villages of Plascassier and Opio. It extends across 895 hectares (2,211 acres) and has a population of over 3,600 inhabitants. It is divided into two districts: Pré-du-Lac (where most of the commerce is found) and Le Vignal.

== Population ==
Historical population
Year	Pop.	±% p.a.
1968	1,278	—
1975	1,602	+3.28%
1982	2,128	+4.14%
1990	2,806	+3.52%
1999	2,968	+0.63%
2007	3,139	+0.70%
2012	3,184	+0.29%
2017	3,505	+1.94%
2023	3,815	+1.42%
Source: INSEE

== Personalities ==
- Painter Marina Kulik lives and teaches in Châteauneuf.
- Philanthropist Calouste Gulbenkian lived and is buried in Châteauneuf.
- Actor Anton Diffring and his sister the sculptor Jacqueline Diffring also lived and died in Châteauneuf. He was buried at White Colne in England.
- Harp maker Victor Salvi lived in Châteauneuf for several years.
- Perfumer Jean-Claude de Givenchy lived in Châteauneuf.
- Author Simone Beck lived and died in Châteauneuf.

== See also ==
- Communes of the Alpes-Maritimes department
