= Dead Man's Evidence =

1962 British film by Francis Searle

- Film poster
- Directed by: Francis Searle
- Screenplay by: Arthur La Bern
- Produced by: Francis Searle
- Starring: Conrad Phillips; Jane Griffiths; Veronica Hurst
- Cinematography: Ken Hodges
- Edited by: Jim Connock
- Music by: Ken Thorne
- Production company: Bayford Films
- Distributed by: British Lion Film Corporation
- Release date: 3 September 1962 (UK)
- Running time: 67 min
- Country: United Kingdom
- Language: English

Dead Man's Evidence is a 1962 British black-and-white crime thriller "B" film directed by Francis Searle, starring Conrad Phillips and Jane Griffiths. The screenplay was by Arthur La Bern.

== Plot ==
A British spy is sent to Ireland to investigate the death of a former colleague who defected.

== Cast ==
- Conrad Phillips as David Baxter
- Jane Griffiths as Linda Howard
- Veronica Hurst as Gay Clifford
- Ryck Rydon as Mark Fallon
- Godfrey Quigley as Superintendent O'Brien
- Bruce Seton as Colonel James Somerset
- Harry Webster as Andy
- Maureen Halligan as Mrs Mac
- Laurie Leigh as Pat
- Tommy Duggan as Mr Casey
- Alex Macintosh as Paul Kay
- Frank Sieman as barman
- Middleton Woods as Kim
- Fergus O'Kelly as night porter
- Gordon Waine as hotel waiter
- Sonia Fox as hotel receptionist

== Production ==
The film was made at MGM British Studios, Borehamwood.

== Critical reception ==
The Monthly Film Bulletin wrote: "Though the mystery is too tangled to unravel itself satisfactorily in the limited running time, Arthur La Bern's script scatters its red herrings ingeniously, and the acting is entirely adequate to its demands, with Alex Mackintosh and Veronica Hurst giving especially adroit performances as an astute reporter-photographer team. Essentially light-weight, it does not discredit the new effort to raise the quality of second features that is one of the more encouraging signs in the British cinema these days."

The Radio Times Guide to Films gave the film 2/5 stars, writing: "This provides a sobering insight into how the rest of the British film industry was handling espionage thrillers while Terence Young was making Dr No. With his heyday as TV's William Tell already behind him, Conrad Phillips stars as a spy sent to investigate when the body of a defector is washed up on an Irish beach. The direction is as perfunctory as the script."
