= The Durant Affair =

1962 British film by Godfrey Grayson

- UK theatrical release poster
- Directed by: Godfrey Grayson
- Story by: Eldon Howard
- Produced by: Philip Elton
- Starring: Jane Griffiths; Conrad Phillips; Nigel Green
- Cinematography: Lionel Banes
- Edited by: John Dunsford
- Release date: 1962
- Running time: 65 minutes
- Country: United Kingdom
- Language: English

The Durant Affair is a 1962 British second feature 'B' drama film directed by Godfrey Grayson and starring Jane Griffiths, Conrad Phillips and Nigel Green. It was written by Eldon Howard.

== Plot ==
When a wealthy society hostess dies, the search begins for the rightful heir, unveiling an unexpected heiress.

== Cast ==
- Jane Griffiths as Mary Grant
- Conrad Phillips as Julian Armour
- Nigel Green as Sir Patrick
- Simon Lack as Roland Farley
- Francis de Wolff as Mario Costello
- Richard Caldicot as the Judge
- Michael Beint as Bill Lewis
- Tony Quinn as James O'Flaherty - Manservant
- Ann Lancaster
- Robert Raglan as Ned Dunston (uncredited)
- Katharine Pate as Ethel Durant (uncredited)

== Reception ==
The Monthly Film Bulletin wrote: "Undramatic, repetitive courtroom melodrama with one or two sound performances but little else to recommend it."

Kine Weekly wrote: "Windy and wordy courtroom melodrama … The play is nearly all talk and despite some sound portrayals, bores long before the end. It has no emotional tug or sharp dramatic impact. ... The picture, apart from a couple of restaurant and one hospital sequences, is confined to the court and the director makes its lack of scope even more conspicuous by constantly repeating legal procedure. ... The dialogue seldom scintillates, and the oath is taken so many time by witnesses that it almost becomes a joke."

Chibnall and McFarlane wrote in The British 'B' Film that the film: "has a well-played heroine (Jane Griffiths) with a convincing air of struggling to contain past sadness."
