= The Double Man (1967 film) =

1967 British spy film by Franklin Schaffner

- Directed by: Franklin J. Schaffner
- Screenplay by: Alfred Hayes; Frank Tarloff
- Story by: Frank Tarloff
- Based on: Legacy of a Spy; 1958 novel by Henry S. Maxfield
- Produced by: Hal E. Chester
- Starring: Yul Brynner; Britt Ekland; Clive Revill; Anton Diffring; Moira Lister; Lloyd Nolan
- Cinematography: Denys N. Coop
- Edited by: Richard Best
- Music by: Ernie Freeman
- Production company: Albion Film Corp.
- Distributed by: Warner Bros.-Seven Arts
- Release dates: 25 April 1967 (London, England)
- Running time: 105 minutes
- Country: United Kingdom
- Language: English

The Double Man is a 1967 British spy film starring Yul Brynner, with Britt Ekland, Clive Revill, Anton Diffring, Moira Lister, and Lloyd Nolan appearing in support.

Directed by Franklin Schaffner, the Cold War-era plot is very loosely based on the critically acclaimed 1958 novel Legacy of a Spy by Henry S. Maxfield. Brynner is an assistant director of the CIA agent investigating his son's fatal "skiing accident" in the Austrian Alps. Piecing things together his own way, he slowly is convinced something else is happening and discovers a fiendish Russian-backed Stasi plan.

== Plot ==
In East Berlin during the Cold War of the mid-1960s a colonel in Stasi intelligence explains to a visiting Russian army general his plan to infiltrate the upper ranks of the CIA. He assures the general it cannot fail. Skeptical, the general approves it, but warns that the consequences of failure could be fatal. To him.

At CIA headquarters in Washington, Assistant Deputy Director of Plans Dan Slater receives an internal cable informing him that his teenage son Bobby has been killed while skiing in the Austrian Alps. As the agency's head of espionage, he is instinctively suspicious of the official report that it was an accident, and immediately flies over to investigate.

In St. Anton, Slater meets up with ex-MI-5 agent and former partner Frank Wheatley, who twelve years back had soured on the intelligence life and took up running the international school Slater's son attended. They clash, with Wheatley arguing against Slater's suspicious instincts. As they move through the tiny resort town they are covertly watched by the Stasi intelligence officer and his two operatives.

Slater reluctantly accepts a lack of evidence of murder, but retains his doubts. However, on the train out he finds his son's bloody ski jacket packed in his own baggage. He returns and confronts Wheatley with the discovery, including two obvious ski pole punctures suggesting the boy was shoved off the cliff. Wheatley cannot account for them, and they quarrel. It is revealed that Slater was emotionally distant from his son and deceased wife. When Slater accuses Wheatley of becoming soft and complacent Wheatley responds that Slater's only real love was for his work, earning him a punch in the jaw.

Investigating further, Slater tracks down a young lady who took the same cable car as his son on the day he was killed. She is Gina, a beautiful aid to a frivolous British jet setter who throws extravagant ski parties. At that evening's Slater talks to Gina. She tells him there were two men in the cable car, one in a ski mask and the other simply described as being tall. It is not much to go on, but when shortly afterward the latter man asks her to dance, she chases after Slater to tell him. Slater and Wheatley trace him to a farmhouse on the outskirts of town. While Wheatley waits a distance off, Slater sneaks in, and is confronted by the man and a second Stasi henchmen. A fight ensues, and a kicked gun discharges.

Wheatley hears the shot, and overcome with PTSD from the near-death disaster that drove him out of his career, panics and starts to flee. He shakes it and returns just in time to pick up Slater running out of the farmhouse.

Slater returns to the party and brutally assaults Gina in her bedroom, accusing her of having been the bait to lure the young skier to his death. Wheatley enters and quells the attack, and Slater storms off.

Meanwhile, Slater's superior officer has been growing increasingly agitated. Convinced Slater is recklessly risking a trap, he had ordered the nearest CIA operative to track him down and put him on the next plane to Washington. The agent arrives from Zurich but is unable to stop Slater from heading straight to the farmhouse.

There, it's revealed that the man who had fled the farmhouse earlier had been a Stasi double, Kalmar. Along with plastic surgery, he had spent years perfecting Slater's voice, speech, and personality. Infiltrating him into the CIA at its highest levels requires convincing Agency braintrust that the murder of his son was indeed part of a plot to lure the hardline Slater to his demise. Everything that followed, clear through needing to be rescued and forcibly returned to Washington, is just camouflage for the switch.

Wheatley returns to Gina's to apologize for her being attacked, revealing for the first time that it was Slater's son who had died skiing, and that it had not been an accident.

Wheatley connects with Miller. They find Slater alone at the farmhouse. Miller keeps him in effective custody at the train station.

The real Slater had already been put in a car to be disposed of. It gets held up by a raucous group of revelers on their way to a nighttime ski event. Seizing a chance, Slater bolts the car and eludes his pursuers, but is spotted joining the skiers on their way to the cable car station. The Stasi men catch up and try to apprehend him there.

Gina is among the crowd gathered to watch the race, and recognizes a figure in the cable car as the man Bobby had treated warmly by on the morning of his death. She goes to Wheatley, and they round up Miller and their Slater, and the foursome head up the mountain in a cable car.

Once again, the real Slater had eluded his pursuers, disembarking at the empty middle landing. Discovering

The two Stasi henchman stalk him there. Slater ambushes one, who is then accidentally shot dead by the other. The Wheatly foursome arrives, and Kalmar immediately shoots the remaining Stasi man to conceal his dual identity, then knocks Miller cold.

The two “Slaters” fight, with real one finally pulling off his mask. Unable to determine the double, Wheatley holds both men gunpoint. Each tries to prove he's the real Slater. Forced to choose, Wheatley shoots the less ruthless.

The next morning, Miller and the real Slater leave by train. Discovering Gina aboard, he invites her to sit by him. She accepts.

== Cast ==
- Yul Brynner as Dan Slater / Kalmar
- Britt Ekland as Gina
- Clive Revill as Frank Wheatley
- Anton Diffring as Berthold
- Moira Lister as Mrs. Carrington
- Lloyd Nolan as Edwards
- George Mikell as Max
- Brandon Brady as Gregori
- Julia Arnall as Anna
- David Bauer as Miller
- Ronald Radd as General
- Kenneth J. Warren as Police Chief
- David Healy as Halstead
- Carl Jaffe as Police Surgeon
- Douglas Muir as Wilfred

== Critical reception ==
In The New York Times, Renata Adler found it "a modest third-rate film...But the plotting is tight and Mr. Brynner looks exotic and stony enough to keep one's mind off the title; when the denouement comes it is a moderate surprise;" while more recently, a 2019 review in Cinema Retro called it "one of the better spy films of the era thanks in no small part to the direction of Franklin J. Schaffner."
