= Peter Mayhew (biologist) =

British ecologist

Peter J. Mayhew is a British biologist at the University of York in the United Kingdom. He graduated with a MA in Zoology from University of Oxford, and then undertook a PhD in insect behavioural ecology at Imperial College supervised by Charles Godfray from 1993 to 1996. He is the lead author of a study showing a long-term association between global temperature and biodiversity, origination, and extinction in the fossil record. This study demonstrated that biodiversity tends to be relatively low during greenhouse phases in Earth history and that extinction rates (including mass extinctions) tend to be higher. On the basis of this work he was nominated as one of the "Great Britons of 2007". He is also author of a textbook on evolutionary ecology.
