= The Television Toppers =

British TV female dance company (1950s–1970s)

The Television Toppers, sometimes known as The TV Toppers was a female dance company who performed mostly on BBC TV variety shows but were associated mainly with The Black and White Minstrel Show.

== History ==
Formed in the early 1950s by Leslie Roberts, a well-known cabaret show producer, who also created The Silhouettes, The TV Toppers appeared on light entertainment and variety shows from the 1950s through to the 1970s. They were the resident dancers on the shows which each week featured stars of the time such as Charlie Drake, Josef Locke, Max Bygraves and Anne Shelton. They appeared on the early series of the Billy Cotton Band Show and appeared in all 20 series of The Black and White Minstrel Show.

The Toppers became celebrities in their own right. They hosted their own television show, Toppers About Town, in which the dance troupe visited notable places around London. The nine programs were transmitted from 31 October 1952 to 5 June 1953.

They also appeared unbilled as the dance troupe in The Dam Busters.

== Links ==
- The Television Toppers at IMDb
