= Anton Diffring =

German actor (1916–1989)

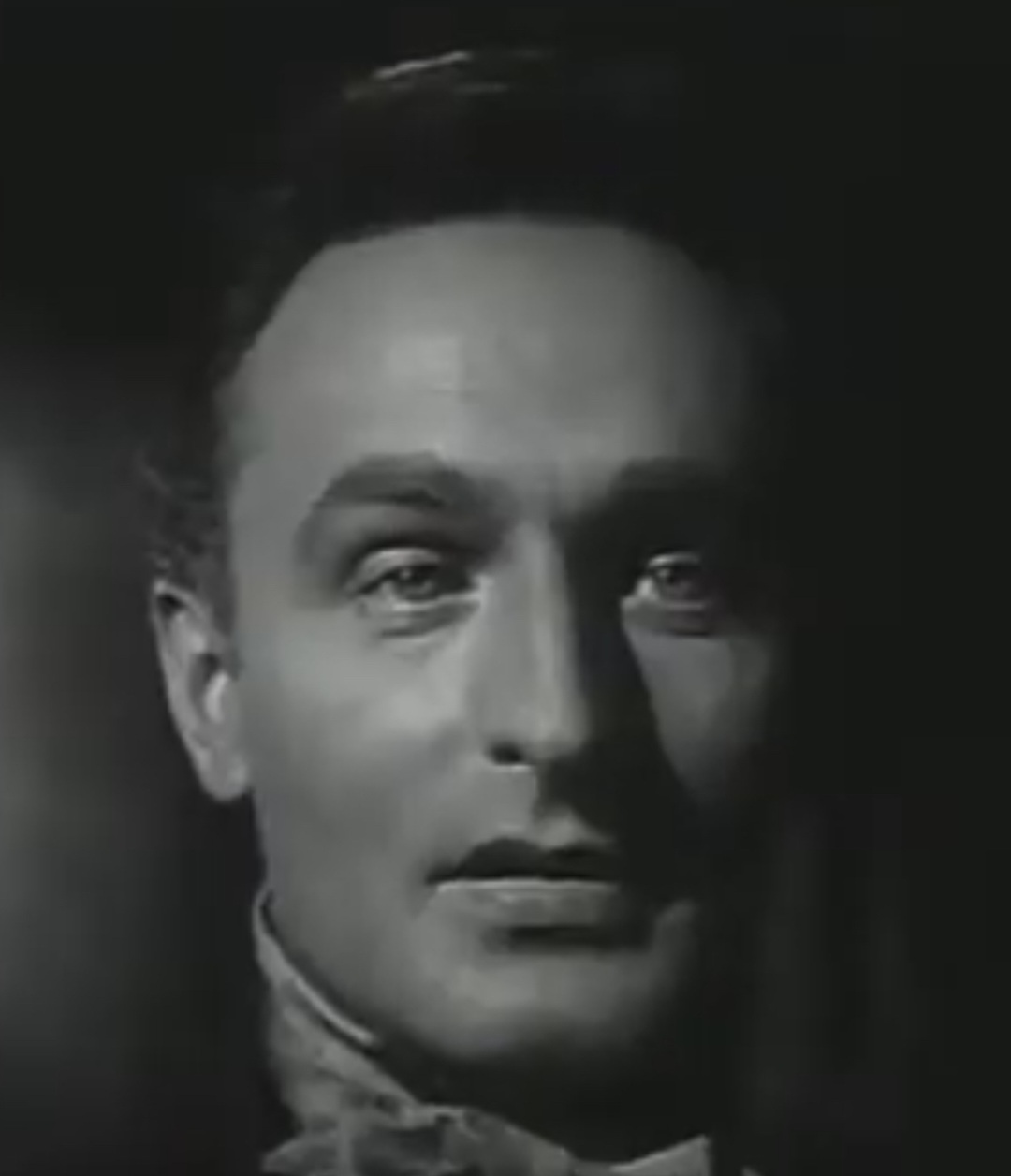
- Diffring as Baron Frankenstein in Tales of Frankenstein (1958)
- Born: Alfred Pollack; 20 October 1916; Koblenz, Rhineland-Palatinate, Germany
- Died: 19 May 1989 (aged 72); Châteauneuf-Grasse, Provence-Alpes-Côte d'Azur, France
- Other name: Anton de Vient
- Occupation: Actor
- Years active: 1940–1988
- Relatives: Jacqueline Diffring (sister)

Anton Diffring (born Alfred Pollack; 20 October 1916 – 19 May 1989) was a German actor. He had an extensive film and television career in the United Kingdom from the 1940s to the 1980s, latterly appearing in international films. Primarily a character actor, he often played Nazi officers in World War II films and villains in horror films, and other antagonistic authority figures.

== Early life ==
Diffring was born Alfred Pollack in Koblenz, Rhineland-Palatinate. His father, Solomon Pollack, was a Jewish shop-owner who managed to avoid internment and survived Nazi rule in Germany. His mother, Bertha Pollack (née Diffring), was Christian. He studied acting in Berlin and Vienna, but there is conjecture about when he left Germany prior to the outbreak of World War II. The audio commentary for the Doctor Who serial Silver Nemesis mentions that he left in 1936 to escape persecution due to his homosexuality. Other accounts point to him leaving in 1939 and settling in Canada, where he was interned in 1940, which is unlikely as he appears in the Ealing Studios film Convoy (released in July 1940, as the officer of U-37, in an uncredited role). His sister Jacqueline Diffring moved to England and became a sculptor.

While in England, he quickly became fluent in English and for a time worked in the War Office as an interpreter. Although he made two fleeting uncredited appearances in films in 1940, it was not until 1950 that his acting career began to take off.

== Career ==
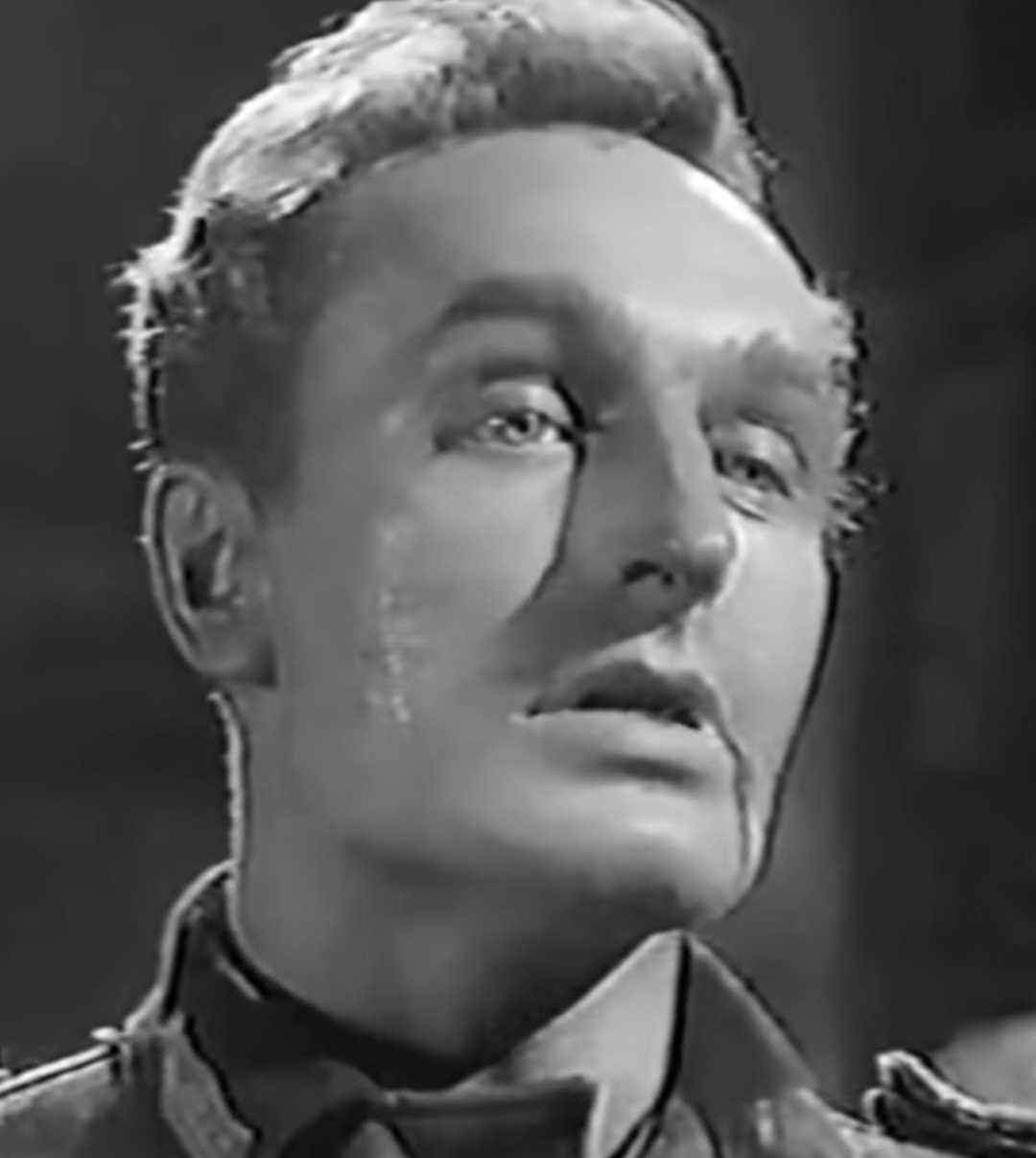
Anton Diffring in an episode of One Step Beyond (1961)

With numerous World War II film and television productions being produced in England from the 1950s, Diffring's "Germanic" physical type of blond hair, pale blue eyes and chiselled features saw him regularly cast in roles as Nazi military officers in films such as Albert R.N. (1953) and The Colditz Story (1955). Some of his other roles as German characters were in The Heroes of Telemark (1965), The Blue Max (1966), Where Eagles Dare (1968), Zeppelin (1971), as SS officer Reinhard Heydrich in Operation Daybreak (1975) and the football match commentator in Escape to Victory (1981), although he also played a Polish parachutist in The Red Beret (1953). He played Hitler's foreign minister Joachim von Ribbentrop in the American mini-series The Winds of War (1983). In the Italian war movie Uccidete Rommel, shot in the Egyptian desert in 1969, he played the role of a British officer of the SAS.

On stage, Diffring played the title role in the musical Mister Venus, opposite Frankie Howerd. It opened at the Prince of Wales Theatre on 23 October 1958 but closed after only sixteen performances. In the show, Diffring sang two solo numbers: "Love Like Ours" and "Tradition". The book was by Ray Galton and Johnny Speight, while the music was by Trevor H. Stanford (Russ Conway) and Norman Newell.

He played a part in the TV mini-series Flambards as the aeronautical pioneer who assists William Russell (Alan Parnaby), second in line of inheritance to the Flambards Estate, who is obsessed with flying. Diffring's character was a German living in Britain shortly before the beginning of the Great War.

Diffring starred in several horror films, such as The Man Who Could Cheat Death (1959) and Circus of Horrors (1960) and played the lead in the television pilot Tales of Frankenstein (1958). He also appeared in international films, such as Fahrenheit 451 (1966), an English-language film directed by François Truffaut. He appeared in the 1964 West German comedy A Mission for Mr. Dodd having previously starred in the West End play Out of Bounds on which it is based.

His final performance was once more as a Nazi for the BBC in the 1988 Doctor Who serial Silver Nemesis.

== Death ==
Diffring died on 19 May 1989 from cancer at his home in Châteauneuf-Grasse, in the South of France, at the age of 72. In a 2002 interview, his longtime friend Arthur Brauss said Diffring had died of complications from AIDS.

His ashes were buried in the graveyard of St Andrew's Church, in the village of White Colne in Essex.

== Partial stage credits ==
- The Constant Wife (1946, Barbizon-Plaza Theatre, New York City) as John Middleton
- I Am a Camera (1955, New Theatre Oxford, later Bristol Hippodrome, later UK tour) as Fritz Wendel
- Mister Venus (1958, Manchester Opera House, later Prince of Wales Theatre, later UK tour) as Mr. Venus
- Henry V (1960, Mermaid Theatre)
- Out of Bounds (1962–63, Wyndham's Theatre, later New Theatre Oxford, later UK tour) as Anton Lesh

== Filmography ==
=== Film ===
- Convoy (1940) as U-Boat officer (uncredited)
- Neutral Port (1940) as Sailor (uncredited)
- State Secret (1950) as State Police Officer at Theatre
- Highly Dangerous (1950) as Officer At Station Check Point (uncredited)
- Hotel Sahara (1951) as German soldier (uncredited)
- Appointment with Venus (1951) as 2nd German soldier
- The Woman's Angle (1952) as Peasant
- Song of Paris (1952) as Renoir
- Top Secret (1952) as East German policeman (uncredited)
- Never Let Me Go (1953) as Hotel Desk Clerk (uncredited)
- The Red Beret (1953) as The Pole
- Park Plaza 605 (1953) as Gregor
- Albert R.N. (1953) as Hauptmann Schultz
- Operation Diplomat (1953) as Shroder
- Betrayed (1954) as Captain Von Stanger
- The Sea Shall Not Have Them (1954) as German Pilot
- The Colditz Story (1955) as Fischer
- I Am a Camera (1955) as Fritz Wendel
- Doublecross (1956) as Dmitri Krassin
- The Black Tent (1956) as Senior Nazi Officer
- Reach for the Sky (1956) as German Stabsfeldwebel
- House of Secrets (1956) as Anton Lauderbach
- The Traitor (1957) as Joseph Brezina
- The Crooked Sky (1957) as Fraser
- Lady of Vengeance (1957) as Karnak
- Seven Thunders (1957) as Colonel Trautman
- A Question of Adultery (1958) as Carl Dieter
- Mark of the Phoenix (1958) as Inspector Schell
- The Man Who Could Cheat Death (1959) as Dr. Georges Bonnet
- Circus of Horrors (1960) as Dr. Schuler
- Enter Inspector Duval (1961) as Inspector Duval
- The Great Escape (1963) as SS Officer (uncredited)
- Incident at Midnight (1963) as Dr. Erik Leichner
- A Mission for Mr. Dodd (1964) as Howard
- Lana, Queen of the Amazons (1964) as Professor Van Vries
- Operation Crossbow (1965) as SS Sturmbannfuhrer (uncredited)
- Shots in Threequarter Time (1965) as Burger
- The Heroes of Telemark (1965) as Major Frick
- The Blue Max (1966) as Holbach
- Fahrenheit 451 (1966) as Fabian
- The Double Man (1967) as Berthold
- Counterpoint (1968) as Colonel Arndt
- Where Eagles Dare (1968) as Colonel Paul Kramer
- Man on Horseback (1969) as Kurfürst
- Uccidete Rommel (Kill Rommel!, 1969) as Captain Richard Howell
- Zeppelin (1971) as Colonel Hirsch
- The Iguana with the Tongue of Fire (1971) as Ambassador Sobiesky
- The Day the Clown Cried (1972, unreleased) as Captain Curt Runkel
- The Stuff That Dreams Are Made Of (1972)
- Little Mother (1973) as The Cardinal
- Mark of the Devil Part II (1973) as Balthasar von Ross
- Seven Deaths in the Cat's Eye (1973) as Dr. Franz
- Battle of Sutjeska (1973) as General Alexander Löhr
- Tony Arzenta (1973) as Grunwald
- Dead Pigeon on Beethoven Street (1974) as Mensur
- Shatter (1974) as Hans Leber
- The Beast Must Die (1974) as Pavel
- Die Antwort kennt nur der Wind (1974) as John Keelwood
- Operation Daybreak (1975) as Reichsprotektor Reinhard Heydrich
- Potato Fritz (1976) as Lieutenant Slade
- The Swiss Conspiracy (1976) as Franz Benninger
- Love Letters of a Portuguese Nun (1977) as Old Priest
- Vanessa (1977) as Cooper
- Waldrausch (1977)
- L'imprécateur (1977) as Ronson
- Valentino (1977) as Baron Long
- Les Indiens sont encore loin (1977) as Le professeur d'allemand
- Son of Hitler (1978) as Gernheim
- The Unicorn (1978) as Blomich
- Io sono mia (1978) as Padre di Suna
- It Can Only Get Worse (1979) as Gloria's first husband
- Tusk (1980) as John Morrison
- Escape to Victory (1981) as German – Chief Commentator – The Commentators
- Non-Stop Trouble with Spies (1983) as Colonel Henderson
- S.A.S. à San Salvador (1983) as Peter Reynolds
- Mary Ward (1985) as Cardinal Millini
- Operation Dead End (1986) as Prof. Lang
- Wahnfried (1986) as Franz Liszt
- The Summer of the Samurai (1986) as Wintrich
- Faceless (1987) as Dr. Karl Heinz Moser
- Anna (1988) as George Mamoulian (final film role)

=== Selected television appearances ===
- Colonel March... (Episode 14: "The Silent Vow", 1956)
- Edgar Wallace Mysteries episode: Incident At Midnight (1962) .... Dr Erik Leichner
- Scobie in September (6 episodes, 1969) .... Pandorus
- Assignment Vienna (8 episodes, 1972–1973) .... Inspector Hoffman
- Thriller (Series 2, Episode 3: "Kiss Me and Die", 1974) .... Jonathan Lanceford
- The Galton & Simpson Playhouse (Episode 1: "Car Along the Pass", 1977) .... Heinz Steiner
- Plutonium (1978) .... Arnold
- Flambards (5 episodes, 1979) .... Mr. Dermot
- The Old Fox: Morddrohung (1980) .... Leo Steglitz
- Arsène Lupin joue et perd (TV mini-series, 1980) .... Wilhelm II
- Derrick: Am Abgrund (1981) .... Alfred Bandera
- Ein Winter auf Mallorca (1982) .... Konsul Fleury
- The Winds of War (4 episodes, 1983) .... Joachim von Ribbentrop
- Derrick: Angriff aus dem Dunkel (1984) .... Scherer
- House Guest (1984) .... Crozier
- End of the World (1984)
- Opération O.P.E.N. (1 episode, 1984) .... Beejlab
- The Masks of Death (1984) .... Graf Udo Von Felseck of Purbridge Manor
- Messieurs les jurés (1 episode, 1985) .... Karl Düren
- Jane Horney (TV mini-series, 1985) .... Adm. Wilhelm Canaris
- Derrick: Nachtstreife (1987) .... de Mohl
- Doctor Who serial Silver Nemesis (3 episodes, 1988) .... De Flores

== Sources ==
- Brian McFarlane, The Encyclopedia of British Film, Methuen, 2003.
