= Jacqueline Diffring =

German-British sculptor (1920–2020)

Jacqueline Diffring (7 February 1920 – 28 September 2020) was a German-British sculptor. She was also the sister of actor Anton Diffring.

== Life and work ==
Diffring was born in Koblenz, Germany in February 1920. She began her artistic studies as a 17-year-old at the Reimann School in Berlin. Two years later, severe discrimination and reprisals by the national socialists made her migrate to the UK. Diffring acquired British citizenship and graduated in fine arts at the Technical College in Cambridge in 1946. At Chelsea School of Art in London she studied sculpture with Willi Soukop and Mac William under Henry Moore. Having completed her education at London University, she worked as a teacher at Wisbech Grammar School. Since the early 1960s Jacqueline Diffring lived and worked in France.

In 2007 she launched a non-profit organization: The Jacqueline Diffring Foundation, dedicated to promoting art and culture, awarding a yearly €5000 prize to a young international sculptor.

Diffring turned 100 in February 2020 and died in September in Châteauneuf Grasse, France.

== See also ==
- List of German women artists
