= Flannelfoot =

1953 film directed by Maclean Rogers

- Directed by: Maclean Rogers
- Written by: Carl Heck; Jack Henry
- Produced by: Edwin J. Fancey
- Starring: Ronald Howard; Mary Germaine; Jack Watling
- Cinematography: Geoffrey Faithfull
- Edited by: Peter Mayhew
- Production company: E.J. Fancey Productions
- Distributed by: New Realm Pictures
- Release date: November 1953
- Running time: 74 minutes
- Country: United Kingdom
- Language: English

Flannelfoot is a 1953 British second feature ('B') crime film directed by Maclean Rogers and starring Ronald Howard, Mary Germaine and Jack Watling. It was written by Carl Heck and Jack Henry, and made at Walton Studios. The film's sets were designed by John Stoll.

The film reflects the media interest in the notorious and elusive cat burglar of the 1930s Harry Edward Vickers who was nicknamed Flannelfoot because he would cover his boots with cloth to silence his footsteps. The title and the burglar's use of cloth on his boots are the only two resemblances between the actual case and the film's plot, with the latter instead mainly set in the early 1950s.

== Plot ==
At New Scotland Yard Inspector Duggan returns to duty, still suffering from memory loss after having a wall toppled on him in the American sector of post-war Berlin many years previously whilst trailing a jewel thief. He is assigned to the 'Flannelfoot' jewel-thief case, which bears many similarities to the thief in Berlin. Offering information on 'Flannelfoot' to the police, the ex-con informer 'Ginger' Watkins is turned away and instead takes it to Mitchell, a newspaper crime writer specialising in 'Flannelfoot', who advises him to take a job with Dr. Milligan, the owner of the car Watkins had seen 'Flannelfoot' driving. There Watkins tells Milligan about prison rumours of "Yank Peterson", the thief who had toppled the wall on Duggan, rumoured to be an American deserter with a talent for accents.

Mitchell's employer Lord Wexford seeks advice from crime novelist Tyrone Fraser, father of Andy and Kathleen. Watkins informs both Mitchell and the police of a meeting Milligan has planned, but both their surveillance operations fail, with Milligan tipped off and Watkins murdered by 'Flannelfoot'. Wexford invites alcoholic Bill Neilson and his wife Angela to a house-party, asking him to bring his jewel collection as bait for 'Flannelfoot'. Wexford's daughter Renee reprimands her boyfriend Andy for getting too close to Angela - he excuses it as an attempt to get Angela's business for his car firm, but in fact he hopes to uncover evidence of the Neilsons being involved in the 'Flannelfoot' affair. 'Flannelfoot' steals jewels from the Wexford residence and murders a servant during his escape, hiding the body in Andy's car, where is found when Andy is pulled over by the police for speeding. Duggan arrests Andy, hoping this will cause the real 'Flannelfoot' to break cover.

'Flannelfoot' meets Milligan to fence Kathleen's jewels and recognises 'Miss Armitage', in fact Kathleen working undercover as Milligan's personal assistant. That night, Fraser disguises himself as 'Flannelfoot', steals some of Neilson's jewels and plants one beside Kathleen's car before hiding in it. Renee and Wexford discover the planted jewel and call in Duggan and his DS Fitzgerald, thinking the real 'Flannelfoot' has struck again and intends to murder Kathleen. Fraser reveals the ruse and the police arrest Milligan, who mentions that 'Flannelfoot' had an American accent. Among the jewels Milligan was planning to fence for 'Flannelfoot' Duggan sees one stolen in Berlin, restoring his memory of 'Yank Peterson'. The Neilsons plan to flee to France, but 'Flannelfoot' arrives and kills Bill, who had been employing him in Berlin and England to expand his collection of jewels and was the only man who could give him away. The police arrive and Fitzgerald manages to push 'Flannelfoot' from the roof, fatally injuring him and revealing him as Mitchell.

== Cast ==
- Ronald Howard as Det. Sgt. Fitzgerald
- Mary Germaine as Kathleen Fraser, Tyrone's daughter and Fitzgerald's love interest
- Jack Watling as Frank Mitchell, crime writer on The Comet
- Ronald Adam as Insp. Duggan
- Stuart Lindsell as Lord Wexford, editor of The Comet
- Gene Anderson as Renee Wexford, Lord Wexford's daughter
- Kim Peacock as Tyrone Fraser, ex-writer on The Comet and crime novelist
- Peter Hammond as Andy Fraser, Tyrone's son and Renee's boyfriend
- Ronald Leigh-Hunt as Dr. Milligan, fence for 'Flannelfoot'
- Graham Stark as Ginger, ex-con and informer
- Edwin Richfield as Bill Neilson, jewel collector
- Alastair Hunter as Superintendent Carter
- Vanda Godsell as Angela Neilson, Bill's wife
- Adrienne Fancey as Cynthia Leyland
- Michael McCarthy as Hawkins
- Diana Coupland as the singer

== Reception ==
The Monthly Film Bulletin wrote: "The plot is confused, everyone acts stupidly and suspiciously, and the result is a routine thriller of no great merit."

Kine Weekly wrote: "Shrewdly varied principal characters skilfully drawn, atmosphere and detail convincing.
