= Peter Mayhew (film editor) =

Peter Mayhew was a British film editor.

== Selected filmography ==
- Down Among the Z Men (1952)
- Forces' Sweetheart (1953)
- Flannelfoot (1953)
- The Colditz Story (1955)
- Assignment Redhead (1956)
- West of Suez (1957)
- Man from Tangier (1958)
- Grip of the Strangler (1958)
- Corridors of Blood (1958)
