= Monica Kimick =

British film editor (1906–1982)

- Born: 1906; Hemel Hempstead, Hertfordshire, United Kingdom
- Died: 28 September 1982 (aged 75–76); Hatfield, Hertfordshire, United Kingdom
- Occupation: Editor
- Years active: 1937–1967 (film)

Monica Kimick (1906–1982) was a British film editor.

== Selected filmography ==
- Aren't Men Beasts! (1937)
- Marigold (1938)
- Lucky to Me (1939)
- The Flying Squad (1940)
- The Middle Watch (1940)
- Dead Man's Shoes (1940)
- Appointment with Crime (1946)
- Spring Song (1946)
- Dual Alibi (1947)
- Uneasy Terms (1948)
- The Three Weird Sisters (1948)
- Man on the Run (1949)
- No Place for Jennifer (1950)
- Last Holiday (1950)
- Johnny on the Spot (1954)
- The Traitor (1957)
- Fighting Mad (1957)
- Girls of the Latin Quarter (1960)
- Shoot to Kill (1960)

== Bibliography ==
- Steve Chibnall. J. Lee Thompson. Manchester University Press, 2000.
