= Meet Mr. Malcolm =

1954 British film by Daniel Birt

- Original British trade ad
- Directed by: Daniel Birt
- Written by: Roger East (novel); Brock Williams
- Produced by: Theo Lageard; Bernard Robinson
- Starring: Adrianne Allen; Sarah Lawson; Meredith Edwards
- Cinematography: Hone Glendinning
- Edited by: Anne Barker
- Music by: Frank Chacksfield
- Production company: Corsair Pictures
- Distributed by: Associated British-Pathé (UK)
- Release date: January 1954 (UK)
- Running time: 65 minutes
- Country: United Kingdom
- Language: English

Meet Mr. Malcolm is a 1954 British 'B' crime film directed by Daniel Birt and starring Adrianne Allen, Sarah Lawson and Meredith Edwards. It was written by Brock Williams based on the novel of the same name by Roger Burford (as Roger East).

== Synopsis ==
Crime writer Colin Knowles is called in by his estranged wife Louie to solve a real-life murder when her employer's body is found at the bottom of a cliff.

== Cast ==
- Adrianne Allen as Mrs. Durant
- Sarah Lawson as Louie Knowles
- Richard Gale as Colin Knowles
- Duncan Lamont as Supt. Simmons
- Meredith Edwards as Whistler Grant
- Pamela Galloway as Andrea Durant
- John Horsley as Tony Barlow
- John Blythe as Carrington-Phelps
- Claude Dampier as Joe Tutt
- Nigel Green as police sergeant
- Simone Lovell
- Jean St Clair as Mrs O'Connor
- Derek Prentice

== Production ==
It was made at Kensington Studios as a second feature.

== Critical reception ==
The Monthly Film Bulletin wrote: "This kind of well-mannered, guessing game detective thriller seems rather old-fashioned. The acting, in the English drawing-room style, with its adjunct, the well-modulated speaking voice, is conscientious but unimpressive, and Claude Dampier imitates the kind of countryman especially reserved for this type of picture. A dull crime story."

Kine Weekly wrote: "Artless, yet occasionally beguiling and exciting, it should intrigue the not too sophisticated. Its length is definitely in its favour. ... The picture cannot boast of flawless team work, but the strained relationship of Louie and Colin, shrewdly plugged, contains human interest and helps to balance the conventional rough stuff. Sarah Lawson, Richard Gale and Duncan Lamont, cast as Louie, Colin and a police superintendent respectively, are the best of the players, and to them goes the credit of putting some seasoning into the ham. Staging adequate rather than outstanding."

The Daily Film Renter wrote: "This would be just another well-handled whodunit but for a most slick and amusing performance by John Blythe as a theatrical agent's stooge. ... The action moves along crisply and the dialogue is better than the usual."

Chibnall & McFarlane called the film "an incoherent murder mystery".

TV Guide wrote: "Not very interesting."
