= Wolfgang Wilhelm =

Wolfgang Wilhelm may refer to:

- Wolfgang Wilhelm, Count Palatine of Neuburg (1578–1653), German prince
- Wolfgang Wilhelm (writer) (1906–1984), German-British screenwriter
