= Arnold Bell =

British actor (1901–1988)

- Arnold Bell in Dunkirk 1958
- Born: May 23, 1901; Yorkshire, England
- Died: March 12, 1988 (aged 86); Worthing, Sussex, England
- Occupation: Actor

Arnold Bell (23 May 1901 – 12 March 1988) was a British actor.

== Selected filmography ==
- Convict 99 (1919) − Warder Gannawy
- Doctor Josser K.C. (1931)
- Josser in the Army (1932) − Becker
- Doss House (1933) − Reporter
- Jack of All Trades (1936) − (uncredited)
- His Lordship (1936) − Ibrahim's Butler (uncredited)
- Strange Experiment (1937) − Leech
- O.H.M.S. (1937) − Matthews (uncredited)
- The Greed of William Hart (1948) − Dr. Cox
- The Temptress (1949) − Dr. Leroy
- No Place for Jennifer (1950) − Judge
- Women of Twilight (1952) − Minor Role (uncredited)
- Appointment in London (1953) − Padre (uncredited)
- Rough Shoot (1953) − Sgt. Baines
- The Fake (1953) − Police Inspector
- Murder at 3am (1953) − McMann
- Star of India (1954) − Captain
- Bang! You're Dead (1954) − The Warder
- The Diamond (1954) − Police Chemist (uncredited)
- The Master Plan (1954) − Gen. Harry Goulding
- The Golden Link (1954) − Det. Insp. Harris
- Profile (1954) − Inspector Crawford
- Svengali (1954) − Tout
- Contraband Spain (1955) − Preventive Officer
- As Long as They're Happy (1955) − Ship's purser
- One Jump Ahead (1955) − Spt. Faro
- A Prize of Gold (1955) − Police Detective
- An Alligator Named Daisy (1955) − Customs Man (uncredited)
- Bond of Fear (1956) − Sergeant at Road Block
- Satellite in the Sky (1956) − Radio Commentator (uncredited)
- The Birthday Present (1957) − Green
- The Safecracker (1958) − Detective
- Dunkirk (1958) − Commander − Royal Navy (uncredited)
- Moment of Indiscretion (1958) − Surgeon
- Virgin Island (US: Our Virgin Island, 1958) − Heath
- The Square Peg (1958) − General Hunt
- Three Crooked Men (1959) − Mr. Brady (uncredited)
- Innocent Meeting (1959) − Fry
- High Jump (1959) − Tom Rowton
- Top Floor Girl (1959) − Stevens Sr.
- The Night We Dropped a Clanger (1959) − Wing Commander Jones
- Night Train for Inverness (1960) − Doctor on Train (uncredited)
- Sentenced for Life (1960) − Williams
- An Honourable Murder (1960) − Ligar
- Feet of Clay (1960) − Magistrate
- Fate Takes a Hand (1961) − Finch
- Nothing Barred (1961) − Prison Governor
- In the Doghouse (1961) − Magistrate (uncredited)
- The Pursuers (1961) − Luther's Colleague (uncredited)
- A Stitch in Time (1963) − Doctor (uncredited)
- Seance on a Wet Afternoon (1964) − Mr. Weaver (uncredited)
- Do You Know This Voice? (1964) − Desk Sergeant
- The Runaway (1964) − Staff Officer
- Troubled Waters (1964) − Attendant
- Three Hats for Lisa (1965) − Hilton Doorman
- Curse of the Fly (1965) − Hotel Porter
