= Floodtide =

1949 British film by Frederick Wilson

- Original pressbook
- Directed by: Frederick Wilson
- Written by: George Blake; Donald B. Wilson; Frederick Wilson
- Produced by: Donald B. Wilson
- Starring: Gordon Jackson; Rona Anderson; John Laurie; Jimmy Logan
- Cinematography: George Stretton
- Edited by: Peter Bezencenet
- Music by: Robert Irving
- Production company: Aquila Film
- Distributed by: General Film Distributors (UK)
- Release dates: 15 March 1949 (London, UK)
- Running time: 90 minutes
- Country: United Kingdom
- Language: English

Floodtide is a 1949 British romantic drama film directed by Frederick Wilson and starring Gordon Jackson, Rona Anderson, John Laurie and Jimmy Logan. It was written byy George Blake, Donald B. Wilson and Frederick Wilson.

The film was one of the four of art director David Rawnsley's films that used his "independent frame" technique, a form of back projection.

== Plot ==
A young Scotsman becomes a ship designer instead of following the family tradition and entering farming. He works his way up the firm, marries the boss's daughter, and revolutionises shipbuilding.

== Cast ==
- Gordon Jackson as David Shields
- Rona Anderson as Mary Anstruther
- John Laurie as Joe Drummond
- Jack Lambert as Anstruther
- Jimmy Logan as Tim Brogan
- Janet Brown as Rosie
- Elizabeth Sellars as Judy
- Gordon McLeod as Pursey
- Ian McLean as Sir John
- Archie Duncan as Charlie Campbell
- James Woodburn as John Shields
- Molly Weir as Mrs. McTavish
- Ian Wallace as 1st director
- Alexander Archdale as 2nd director
- Grace Gavin as Mrs. McCrae

== Critical reception ==
The Monthly Film Bulletin wrote: "The Clydebank shipyards make an effective setting for a story which, though conventional and often absurd, at least is unpretentiously told. Thanks to capable direction and camerawork the Glasgow background is convincing, though the same can hardly be said of such details as the design for the model ship. Gordon Jackson gives a sincere performance as David Shields, with Rona Anderson as Mary. Jimmy Logan and Elizabeth Sellars in supporting parts provide the two most successful characterisations."

In The Radio Times Guide to Films David Parkinson gave the film 2/5 stars, writing: "The grim grandeur of the Clyde shipyards provides the setting for this lacklustre melodrama which trades on the British docudramatic tradition while dealing in potboiling clichés. "

The Oxford Times wrote, "this is a classic town-and-country saga that is spiritedly played by an exceptional Scottish ensemble."
