= The Golden Link =

1954 British film by Charles Saunders

- Theatrical release poster
- Directed by: Charles Saunders
- Screenplay by: Allan MacKinnon
- Produced by: Guido Coen
- Starring: André Morell; Patrick Holt; Thea Gregory; Jack Watling
- Cinematography: Harry Waxman
- Edited by: Jack Slade
- Music by: Eric Spear
- Production company: Kenilworth Film Productions
- Distributed by: Archway Film Distributors
- Release date: 24 August 1954
- Running time: 83 minutes
- Country: United Kingdom
- Language: English

The Golden Link is a 1954 British police drama film directed by Charles Saunders, starring André Morell, Patrick Holt, Thea Gregory and Jack Watling. It was produced by Guido Coen under his Kenilworth Film Productions, featuring a screenplay by Allan MacKinnon and soundtrack by Eric Spear. The story concerns the death of a young woman, having fallen to her demise inside an apartment building. A policeman neighbour, Superintendent Blake, conducts an unofficial investigation, which initially seems to implicate his own daughter in a murder plot.

Filmed at Riverside Film Studios in London, the picture was one of several second feature thrillers made in partnership by Saunders and Coen. Restricted by a meagre budget and minor distributors in Archway, production of The Golden Link still stood out for its rich cast and cinematography by Harry Waxman.

The film was generally well received after its release on 24 August 1954. Contemporary reviews broadly characterised it as an interesting and suspenseful whodunit, in spite of the absence of international cast members. More modern assessments have been equally critical regarding a perceived lack of action, although this too has been matched by recent reviews' approval of the plot, particularly toward its beginning.

== Plot ==
In London, a young woman plummets four floors to her death into the hallway of an apartment building also occupied by Superintendent Blake, a police officer. Initially deemed a suicide, Blake suspects foul play but soon finds himself removed from the case. Notwithstanding, he calmly continues to investigate in an unofficial capacity, searching for clues and interviewing persons of interest. Blake eventually narrows his search to two suspects: the victim's husband, Terry Maguire, and his own daughter, Joan, whom happens to be in love with the former. Learning that she had tried to convince Maguire of divorcing the victim, he deduces both to have had ample motive and opportunity to commit murder. Despite his suspicions, Blake finally discovers neither to have been responsible for the crime, Joan having been framed by another neighbour, the true killer.

== Cast ==
The film's cast comprises:

- André Morell as Supt. Blake
- Patrick Holt as Terry Maguire
- Thea Gregory as Joan Blake
- Jack Watling as Bill Howard
- Marla Landi as Singer
- Arnold Bell as Det. Insp. Harris
- Olive Sloane as Mrs Pullman
- Bruce Beeby as Sgt. Fred Baker
- Alexander Gauge as Arnold Debenham
- Ellen Pollock as Mme Sonia
- Dorinda Stevens as Norma Sheridan
- Charlie Drake as Joe
- Edward Lexy as Maj. Grey
- Elsie Wagstaff as Mrs West

== Production ==
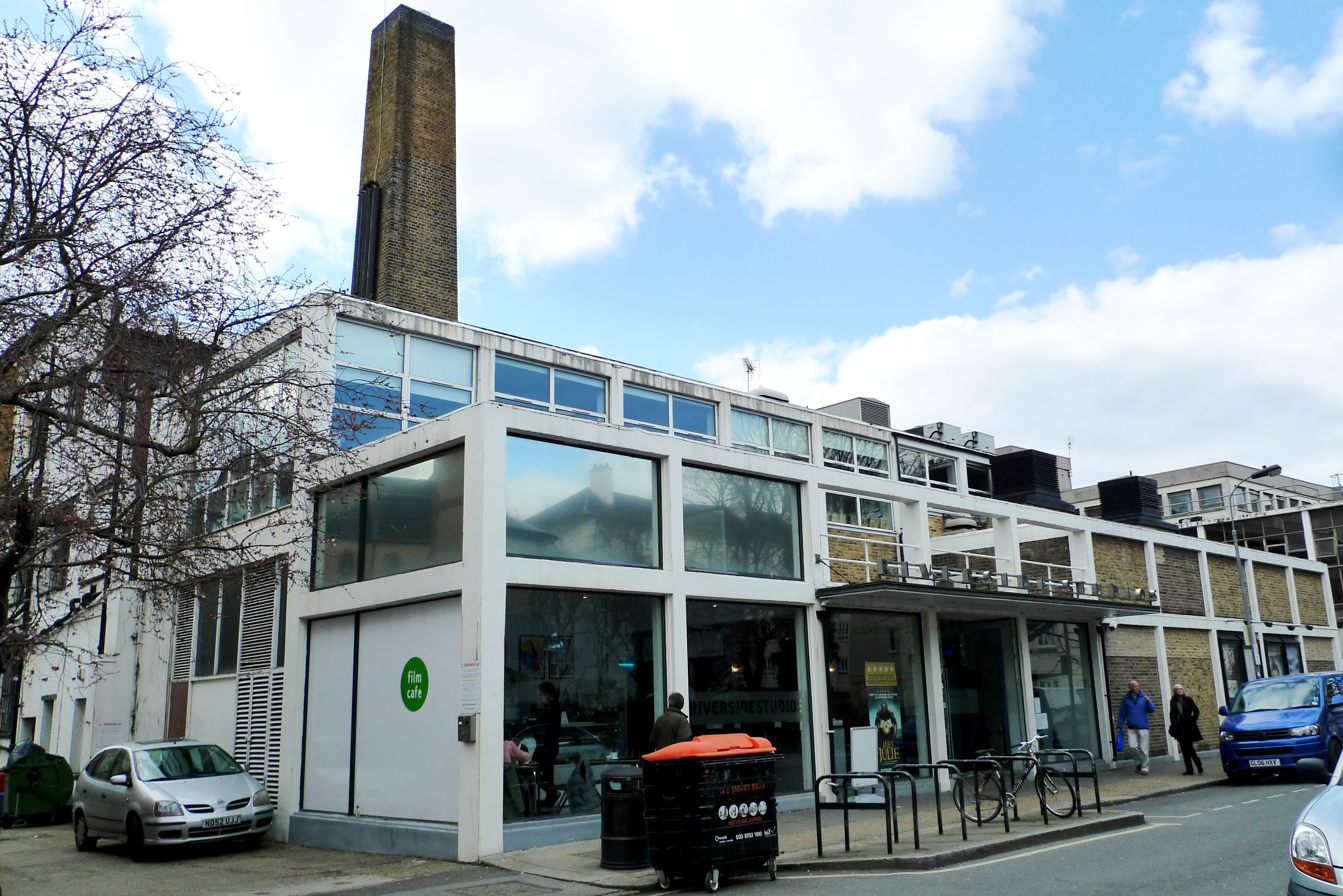
The Golden Link was filmed at Riverside Film Studios in London (pictured in 2013)

The Golden Link was produced by Guido Coen, who under his Kenilworth Film Productions made "about a dozen" second feature thrillers with Charles Saunders between 1954 and 1961. Of these pictures, typically made on a £13,000 budget, (Note: £13,000 in 1954 equated approximately to £349,000 in 2018; this figure accounts for the increase in retail price index (RPI) percentage between the two years.) Coen stated "style was of secondary consideration", viewing them solely as a means to make a living. While Coen and Saunders made some of these films for major distributors, including Rank, Pathé and Columbia, The Golden Link was instead acquired by a minor company, Archway.

Contrary to its unremarkable financing and distribution, The Golden Link nonetheless harboured "co-feature aspirations" as a consequence of its popular cast (especially Morell, Holt and the debuting Landi), the cinematography of Harry Waxman, as well as through filming at Riverside Film Studios in Hammersmith, London. Wilfred Arnold designed the set at Riverside as the film's art director, accompanying a script by Allan MacKinnon, his first of three under Saunders, and music by Eric Spear; the picture was edited by Jack Slade.

== Critical response ==
Contemporary reviews of The Golden Link were generally favourable. The critic F. Maurice Speed, published in Film Review, commended the picture as an "excellent, modest British whodunit", a view shared in-part by Punch, which while deeming it "a quite ordinary whodunit", nevertheless argued that "there are points about it that make it more interesting to discuss than many a much better and more unusual film". Moderate praise was similarly awarded by Variety, which labelled the film as a "neatly contrived whodunit with sufficient suspense to hold interest", highlighting Saunders' direction in particular. The reviewer nonetheless remained critical regarding the film's lack of foreign talent.

A more recent appraisal by the film historian Steve Chibnall and the film critic Brian McFarlane found The Golden Link, alongside The Hornet's Nest (1955) and Behind the Headlines (1956), to not be "among Saunders' best", "suffer[ing] from an excess of talk and too little action". Conversely, a retrospective review from TV Guide found the film to be a "well-crafted mystery", giving it 3/5 stars. Furthermore, writing for AllMovie, the media historian Hal Erickson notes "a spectacularly violent start" in his assessment of the picture, awarding 2.5/5 stars.
