= Man with a Gun (1958 film) =

1958 film by Montgomery Tully

- Original British quad poster
- Directed by: Montgomery Tully
- Screenplay by: Michael Winner
- Produced by: Jack Greenwood
- Starring: Lee Patterson; Rona Anderson; John Le Mesurier; Glen Mason
- Cinematography: John Wiles
- Edited by: Geoffrey Muller
- Music by: Ron Goodwin
- Production company: Merton Park Studios
- Distributed by: Anglo-Amalgamated Film Distributors (UK)
- Release date: August 1958 (UK)
- Running time: 60 minutes
- Language: English

Man with a Gun is a low-budget 1958 British second feature ('B') crime film directed by Montgomery Tully and starring Lee Patterson, Rona Anderson and John Le Mesurier. The screenplay was by Michael Winner.

== Plot ==
Insurance investigator Mike Davies looks into a suspicious fire that burned down a nightclub. He initially suspects the club's manager, Harry Drayson, but after Davies meets Drayson's niece Stella, she helps him uncover a mob protection scheme responsible for the arson.

== Cast ==
- Lee Patterson as Mike Davies
- Rona Anderson as Stella
- John Le Mesurier as Harry Drayson
- Bill Nagy as Joe Harris
- Marne Maitland as Max
- Glen Mason as Steve Riley
- Carlo Borelli as Carlo
- Harold Lang as John Drayson
- Cyril Chamberlain as Superindendent Wood
- Dorinda Stevens as club receptionist

== Critical reception ==
The Monthly Film Bulletin wrote: "This crime melodrama is a routine British second feature competently made and efficiently acted. Although it has few distinctive features it fulfils its purpose in a workmanlike way."

Picturegoer wrote: "This British thriller pegs its plot on a real oldie idea – gangsters muscling in on a nightclub. But it still packs some punch. [Lee] Patterson, who has become number-one raincoat hero of "B" thrillers, deserves better vehicles for his rough-cut sex appeal than this weakly scripted story. However, as a whodunit the film is a neat, briskly paced job. For the disc fans, Glen Mason weighs in with two pop numbers."

Picture Show wrote: "Well portrayed, it has a slight romantic interest and some suspenseful action."

In British Sound Films: The Studio Years 1928–1959 David Quinlan rated the film as "average", writing: "Embryo director's first script not a winner, but direction keeps brisk pace."

TV Guide called it a "so-so crime story. Despite some fast pacing in the direction, the script is too simplistic for the fare."
