= Tapping up =

Persuading a player to transfer without permission from the player's current team

In professional team sports, tapping up (British English) or tampering (American English) is an attempt to persuade a player contracted to one team to transfer to another team, without the knowledge or permission of the player's current team. This kind of approach is often made through the player's agent.

Often, to forestall the appearance of any palpable evidence of unethical behavior such transactions are informally negotiated while the player is still under contract, only being announced once the player's contract expires and/or the period where such transfers are officially permitted has commenced. While not criminal conduct, tampering expressly forbidden by many professional leagues in their collective bargaining agreements, bylaws and/or other rules and regulations. Incidents of tampering, when detected, can result in fines and/or sporting-related penalties being enforced against the offending teams, players, agents and/or other facilitating parties.

== In English football ==
A milder form of "tapping up" involves a manager's letting his admiration for a player at another club become known, perhaps by hinting at his interest while working as a pundit during the broadcast of a game in which the player is taking part or by lavishing praise in programme notes when the two teams meet. Most ex-players candidly admit that tapping up has gone on in football for decades. Nottingham Forest manager Brian Clough later said, "we tapped more players than the Severn-Trent water board!"

Notorious examples of tapping up in the Premier League include Dwight Yorke, Jermain Defoe and Ashley Cole. In these cases, the incidents soured the relationship between the player and his original club. Cole was found guilty and fined £100,000 by the Premier League on 2 June 2005 for a meeting in a hotel in January 2005 between himself, the Chelsea manager José Mourinho, Chelsea chief executive, Peter Kenyon, and his agent Jonathan Barnett.

Chelsea were again at the centre of a controversy in 2009, when the club was found guilty of inducing Gaël Kakuta to break his contract with French team RC Lens in 2007. As punishment, they were banned by FIFA from registering new players for two transfer windows. Chelsea appealed to the Court of Arbitration for Sport, who subsequently lifted the sanctions on the club and the player after ruling that Kakuta did not have a valid contract with Lens, and therefore could not have breached it. Chelsea's transfer ban was suspended later in the same year, and was lifted in February 2010. Harry Redknapp, manager of Tottenham Hotspur at that time, has said that activity which verges upon "tapping-up" regularly occurs in deals between Premier League clubs, and Scott Minto, a pundit for Sky Sports, said that the ban was "extremely harsh" because of the frequency of it. However, there have been other cases where clubs have received transfer window bans for tapping-up; notably, Roma over Philippe Mexès, and FC Sion over Essam El-Hadary.

The practice of tapping up is portrayed in the 1953 British film The Great Game.
