= Monarch Film Corporation =

British film company

The Monarch Film Corporation was a British film distribution company active during the 1940s and 1950s. It specialised in supplying second features to British cinemas. The company handled a mixture of British and American films, as well as the Australian film Strong Is the Seed. It involved itself in production at times, and produced several more ambitious features including Hindle Wakes (1952) and A Yank in Ermine (1956). It had an arrangement with ACT Films under John Croydon to handle films made at Walton Studios. The 1952 adventure film Men Against the Sun (1952) was, unusually for the second feature market, a costume adventure film despite its running time.

It should not be confused with John R. Freuler's American company of the same name active during the early 1930s.

== Selected filmography ==
=== British ===
- A Gunman Has Escaped (1948)
- The Case of Charles Peace (1949)
- The Girl Who Couldn't Quite (1950)
- Lilli Marlene (1950)
- Night Was Our Friend (1951)
- Hindle Wakes (1952)
- Circumstantial Evidence (1952)
- Private Information (1952)
- Men Against the Sun (1952)
- House of Blackmail (1953)
- The Blue Parrot (1953)
- The Wedding of Lilli Marlene (1953)
- Profile (1954)
- Burnt Evidence (1954)
- Devil's Point (1954)
- Final Appointment (1954)
- Dangerous Cargo (1954)
- The Delavine Affair (1955)
- Room in the House (1955)
- A Yank in Ermine (1956)
- That Woman Opposite (1957)
- And the Same to You (1960)
- The Party's Over (1965)
- Just like a Woman (1967)
- The Violent Enemy (1968)

=== American ===
- Adventure in Music (1949)
- Springtime in Texas (1949)
- Partners in Time (1951)
- The Hoodlum (1951)
- Mom and Dad (1952)
- Charade (1953)
- A Life at Stake (1955)
- Silent Fear (1956)
- Wetbacks (1956)

== Bibliography ==
- Chibnall, Steve & McFarlane, Brian. The British 'B' Film. Palgrave MacMillan, 2009.
