= Madame Sin =

- Written by: David Greene; Barry Oringer
- Directed by: David Greene
- Starring: Bette Davis; Robert Wagner
- Music by: Michael Gibbs
- Country of origin: United Kingdom
- Original language: English

Production
- Producers: Lew Grade; Lou Morheim; Robert Wagner; Julian Wintle
- Cinematography: Anthony B. Richmond
- Running time: 75 minutes

Original release
- Release: 15 January 1972

Madame Sin is a 1972 British thriller film directed by David Greene and starring Bette Davis, Robert Wagner, Denholm Elliott and Gordon Jackson. The screenplay was written by Greene and Barry Oringer.

== Plot ==
Ex-CIA agent Anthony Lawrence is abducted from London and brought to the Scottish Highlands on the orders of Madame Sin, an international criminal who runs her own organisation. From her base, she operates a "Thought Factory" where scientists have developed advanced technology, including sonic weapons and a device that can implant thoughts into a subject's brain. She demonstrates the thought implantation process on her assistant Nikko, who is able to play a Mozart piece after having it implanted in her brain in seconds.

Madame Sin persuades Lawrence that his partner Barbara, also an intelligence agent, was sent to her death on the orders of Lawrence's former superior, Connors. She shows him secretly filmed footage of Barbara being tortured by Chinese agents as proof. She uses this as leverage to get Lawrence to cooperate with her plan to steal a new Polaris nuclear submarine which is due to be tested in nearby waters and sell it to foreign radicals.

Lawrence plays along with Madame Sin's plan, which involves abducting his old friend Cavendish, a Royal Navy officer in charge of the submarine test, and implanting the idea to steal the submarine into his brain. Lawrence discovers that the film of Barbara's torture was fake when he recognises a scar on the hand of one of Madame Sin's henchmen. Barbara then appears alive and well and is held hostage while Lawrence returns Cavendish to the naval base to carry out the rest of the plan.

Lawrence tries to escape and is rendered deaf when the sonic weapon is used on him. He manages to penetrate the naval base and raise the alarm. Lawrence's old boss Connors has Cavendish put under arrest and thwarts the plan to steal the submarine. Later in Spain, Lawrence and Barbara are celebrating when Barbara reveals that she is working for Madame Sin and has poisoned his drink. Ordered to wait until he is dead, she watches him die then departs with one of Madame Sin's henchmen.

== Cast ==
- Bette Davis as Madame Sin
- Robert Wagner as Anthony Lawrence
- Denholm Elliott as Malcolm De Vere
- Gordon Jackson as Commander Cavendish
- Dudley Sutton as Monk
- Catherine Schell as Barbara
- Pik-Sen Lim as Nikko
- Paul Maxwell as Connors
- David Healy as Braden
- Alan Dobie as White

== Production ==
Exteriors were filmed on location at Ascot, Berkshire; Mull, Argyll in Scotland; and Piccadilly in London. Interiors were shot at the Pinewood Studios in Buckinghamshire.

== Release ==
The film was originally a pilot for a weekly TV series that failed to make the network's schedule. It was broadcast as an ABC Movie of the Week in the United States on 15 January 1972 and then released in other markets as a feature film.

== Reception ==
Time Out London wrote "Lots of exotic sets and outlandish secret weapons, just a pity it's all rather old hat Bond stuff. Still, with Denholm Elliott giving sterling support as her sycophantic aide, Davis has a ball with some genuinely monstrous lines."

At Diary of a Movie Maniac, Eric Binford wrote:

Bette Davis seems to be having fun as the film’s eponymous villainess. Davis struts through the sleek sets in chic black gowns (courtesy of costume designer Edith Head, All About Eve), furiously spitting out venomous remarks. Allegedly, Davis's black wig was an exact copy of the one she wore in the 1939 movie Juarez.

Robert Wagner, who co-produced the film, is good as the spy caught in Madame Sin's web of terror. Even though they play adversaries in the movie, Wagner and Davis are splendidly in sync, and their scenes together are filled with witty exchanges. The actors were good friends in real life, and I think that shows somehow on the screen.
