= Circumstantial Evidence (1952 film) =

British crime film by Daniel Birt

- Directed by: Daniel Birt
- Written by: Allan MacKinnon
- Produced by: Philip Brandon
- Starring: Rona Anderson; Patrick Holt; Frederick Leister
- Cinematography: Brendan J. Stafford
- Edited by: Eily Boland
- Production company: A.C.T. Films
- Distributed by: Monarch Film Corporation
- Release date: 17 November 1952
- Running time: 61 minutes
- Country: United Kingdom
- Language: English

Circumstantial Evidence is a 1952 British second feature ('B') crime film directed by Daniel Birt and starring Rona Anderson, Patrick Holt and Frederick Leister. It was written by Allan MacKinnon.

== Plot ==
Linda Harrison is about to divorce her estranged husband Steve, who walked out on her nearly three years earlier. Since his departure she has met and fallen in love with another man, Michael Carteret, and they intend to marry as soon as she can divorce Steve for desertion. Then Steve walks back into Linda's life, with the sole purpose of making trouble, and as much money as he can. He steals Michael's love letters to Linda, and tries to blackmail her and Michael; he demands that Michael visit him or he will take the letters to the General Medical Council. Michael goes to see Steve and tells him they have no intention of paying him anything, and that the GMC will have more sense than to take notice of his insinuations. But then Steve insults Linda and Michael punches him. Soon afterwards, Steve is found dead and the evidence points to Michael Carteret as the murderer. Linda sets out to prove his innocence.

== Cast ==
- Rona Anderson as Linda Harrison
- Patrick Holt as Michael Carteret
- John Arnatt as Steve Harrison
- John Warwick as Pete Hanken
- Frederick Leister as Sir Edward Carteret
- Ronald Adam as Sir William Hanson QC
- June Ashley as Rita Hanken
- Peter Swanwick as Charlie Pott
- Lisa Lee as Gladys Vavasour
- Ballard Berkeley as Inspector Hall
- Ian Fleming as Commander Hewitt
- Ben Williams as Brand
- Leonard White as Det. Sgt. Davey

== Production ==
The film was produced by Phil Brandon for Act Films Ltd. It was made at Shepperton Studios. Art Director Norman G. Arnold designed the sets.

== Critical reception ==
The Monthly Film Bulletin wrote: "A conventional and unremarkable little detective story whose solution becomes obvious at rather too early a stage in the proceedings.”

Picturegoer wrote: "Meaty and exciting crime melodrama in pocket form .... Rona Anderson is most persuasive as Linda, and Patrick Holt, John Arnatt and Frederick Leister also bring conviction."

Picture Show wrote: "Stimulating murder melodrama with real London backgrounds, skilfully acted, deftly directed, and with an ever-present sense of humour."

In British Sound Films: The Studio Years 1928–1959 David Quinlan said: ''Ordinary pocket 'meller'.''

Chibnall and McFarlane in The British 'B' Film call the film "a conventional but well-crafted murder mystery".
