= Secret People (film) =

1952 British film by Thorold Dickinson

- Original UK poster
- Directed by: Thorold Dickinson
- Written by: Thorold Dickinson; Wolfgang Wilhelm; Christianna Brand
- Produced by: Sidney Cole
- Starring: Audrey Hepburn; Valentina Cortese; Serge Reggiani; Charles Goldner
- Cinematography: Gordon Dines
- Edited by: Peter Tanner
- Music by: Robert Gerhard
- Production company: Ealing Studios
- Distributed by: General Film Distributors
- Release date: 8 February 1952 (UK)
- Running time: 96 minutes
- Country: United Kingdom
- Language: English
- Box office: £60,000

Secret People is a 1952 British drama film directed by Thorold Dickinson and produced by Sidney Cole for Ealing Studios, with screenplay by Thorold Dickinson and Wolfgang Wilhelm, acknowledgement to Joyce Cary and additional dialogue by Christianna Brand. It stars Valentina Cortese, Serge Reggiani and Audrey Hepburn. The film provided Audrey Hepburn with her first significant film role.

== Plot ==
In 1930, Maria Brentano and her younger sister Nora flee to London as their father is about to be executed by his country's dictator. Seven years later, Maria unexpectedly meets Louis, her childhood sweetheart, who is engaged in a plot to assassinate the dictator. Maria is persuaded to play an active part in the plan, but it all goes horribly wrong when the bomb they plant kills an innocent waitress, causing Maria much distress.

== Cast ==
- Valentina Cortese as Maria Brentano
- Serge Reggiani as Louis Balan
- Audrey Hepburn as Nora Brentano
- Charles Goldner as Anselmo
- Michael Shepley as manager of the British Pavilion
- Angela Fouldes as Nora (as a child)
- Megs Jenkins as Penny
- Irene Worth as Miss Jackson
- Reginald Tate as Inspector Eliot
- Norman Williams as Sergeant Newcombe
- Athene Seyler as Mrs Reginald Kellick
- Sydney Tafler as Syd Burnett
- Geoffrey Hibbert as Steenie
- John Ruddock as Daly
- Michael Allan as Rodd
- John Field as Fredor Luki
- Charlie Cairoll and Paul as themselves (clowns)
- Hugo Schuster as General Galborn
- Lionel Harris as Frack
- Rollo Gamble as Bentley
- John Penrose as Bill
- John Chandos as John
- Michael Ripper as Charlie
- Yvonne Coulette as woman on London Committee
- Louis Mansi as member of Paris Committee
- John Gabriel as member of Paris Committee
- Olga Landiak as member of Paris Committee
- Frederick Schiller as Galbern's bodyguard
- Gaston Richer as Queval
- Derek Elphinstone as plain clothes man
- Edward Evans as plain clothes man
- Jack McNaughton as postman
- Ingeborg von Kusserow as shoe shop girl
- Bob Monkhouse as hairdresser
- Sam Kydd as Detective Sergeant

== Release ==
Although finished before August 1951 (the film was screened by the BBFC censors on 7 August 1951), it did not premiere at The Odeon Leicester Square in London until 8 February 1952.

== Reception ==
=== Critical ===
The Monthly Film Bulletin wrote: "Secret People is considerably more than a political melodrama; it is concerned with the moral issues involved in the use of violence to resist violence, with the corrupting effects of such methods ... and, especially, with personal relationships – Maria's disturbed and unhappy love for Louis and her protective devotion to her sister. The controlled, highly distinctive narrative style focuses and develops these relationships and, notably in the sustained passage from Louis' persuasion of Maria to her tortured and desperate visit to Scotland Yard, the full weight of the theme emerges with clarity and force. ... The intellectual level of the film, one feels, should be more equal to the emotional. ... The faults of Secret People are obvious enough; they are, however, subsidiary. The tension and power of the film make it one of the most remarkable British productions for some time."

Kine Weekly wrote: "The picture, a backward glance to the days of a phoney peace when apparently London was a hotbed of infrigue, not only fails adequately to label its leading characters, played with as much conviction as their accents permit by Valentina Cortesa and Serge Reggiani, but overloads its dishevelled, not to say outmoded, plot with detail. The ballet sequences are more decorative than relevant and the trip to Paris is a luxury rather than a necessity. Drenched with local colour, it seldom touches the heart nor creates real suspense."

The reviewer for The Times found Secret People to be "a confused, inarticulate, disappointing film, neither as imaginative nor as intellectually exciting as it should be."

George Perry wrote in Forever Ealing that "...there is much of interest in the Ealing film, such as the moral dilemma of those who have to resort to force to overcome force." He also praised "a sensitive performance by Valentina Cortesa, ... a substantial role for Audrey Hepburn", and felt that the film had been misinterpreted and "was in some respects ahead of its time."

=== Box office ===
The film was a box office flop.
