= Men Against the Sun =

- Directed by: Brendan J. Stafford
- Written by: Alastair Scobie
- Produced by: K.S. Sagoo; Alastair Scobie
- Starring: John Bentley; Zena Marshall
- Cinematography: Brendan J. Stafford
- Music by: Eric Spear
- Production company: Kenya Films
- Distributed by: Monarch Film Corporation
- Release date: 1952
- Running time: 65 minutes
- Country: United Kingdom
- Language: English

Men Against the Sun is a 1952 British second feature ('B') historical adventure film directed by Brendan J. Stafford and starring John Bentley and Zena Marshall. It was written by Alastair Scrobie. It depicts the attempts to construct a railway in late Victorian Africa.

== Plot ==
In Mombasa, Father Dowling convinces engineer Hawker to assist in building a railway from Mombasa to Uganda. Hawker brings along Tanner, a big-game hunter. Dr. Elizabeth Martin, who plans to open a mission hospital, also joins them. Work on the railway is seriously disrupted by night attacks by two lions. Tanner kills one of the lions, and when the other attacks Elizabeth's hospital, it is killed by Hawker, who has fallen in love with Elizabeth.

== Cast ==
- John Bentley as Hawker
- Zena Marshall as Elizabeth Martin
- Liam O'Leary as Father Dowling
- Alan Tarlton as Tanner
- Edward Johnson as Salim

== Production ==
It was shot on location in Kenya; this was unusually ambitious for a second feature film at the time.

== Reception ==
The Monthly Film Bulletin wrote: "Some films are second-rate in their whole conception; others betray the failure of good intentions. This film, the first to be made in Kenya, and set in a period before 1914, falls into the second group. It is a curious tangle of loose ends, which leaves one wondering what the original story-line was intended to be. 'The railway, big-game hunting and mission work compete in turn for the spotlight; the Indian workers suggest a motive never developed, and at the beginning there is a distracting flashback of an attack on a native village by Arab slave-traders. Not until the end, with Hawker's killing of the lion, does it attain any dramatic excitement. Technically the film is better than its script or its acting; photography of the East African settings and of the marauding lions is excellent."

Kine Weekly wrote: "The picture, set in the late nineties, not only describes the hazards that had to be conquered before railways could be built in Africa, but reminds its audience of the comparatively short space of time that has elapsed since women medicos were treated with suspicion. John Bentley and Zena Marshall act well enough to make story point, as Hawker and Elizabeth, but the mainstay of the melodrama is its exciting native and animal interest, framed in grand scenery. Camera work is first class. Disarmingly naive, yet, clearly out of the rut, it rightly earns a place on the average programme."

The Daily Film Renter wrote: "This is the first production made with the support of tha Kenya Government and is a most praiseworthy beginning. All scenes, both exterior and interior, were made in the Colony. Its faults are indefiniteness in scripting and direction and a certain amateurishness. Its virtues are its actuality shots of the country and wild game, a flashback showing an Arab slave raid, and much fine photography of Mombasa, as well as records of native and Indian customs, dancers and music. "

In British Sound Films: The Studio Years 1928–1959 David Quinlan rated the film as "average", writing: "Drama is ordinary, but the settings make it worthwhile."

== See also ==
- Killers of Kilimanjaro (1959)
