= The Great Game (1953 film) =

Sports-comedy drama film by Maurice Elvey

- Original British theatrical poster
- Directed by: Maurice Elvey
- Written by: Wolfgang Wilhelm
- Based on: the play Shooting Star by Basil Thomas
- Produced by: David Dent
- Starring: James Hayter; Thora Hird; Diana Dors; John Laurie
- Cinematography: Phil Grindrod
- Edited by: Lito Carruthers
- Music by: W.L. Trytel
- Production company: Advance
- Distributed by: Adelphi Films
- Release date: January 1953; (UK)
- Running time: 80 minutes
- Country: United Kingdom
- Language: English

The Great Game is a 1953 British sports comedy-drama directed by Maurice Elvey and starring James Hayter, Thora Hird and Diana Dors. It was written by Wolfgang Wilhelm based on the play Shooting Star by Basil Thomas. Many of the scenes were shot at Griffin Park, the home of Brentford F.C. Several professional football players made appearances in the film including Tommy Lawton.

== Plot ==
Joe Lawson is the chairman of a relegation zone English football club and he makes an illegal approach to a rising star of a rival club. The manager of the rival club makes an accusation which is picked up by the press. When Lawson is questioned by his board and his account of events is doubted, he impulsively offers his resignation, but is shocked when it is accepted and he is quickly replaced. He decides he will turn his attentions to cricket instead.

== Cast ==
- James Hayter as Joe Lawson
- Thora Hird as Miss Rawlings
- Diana Dors as Lulu Smith
- John Laurie as 'Mac' Wells
- Meredith Edwards as Skid Evans
- Jack Lambert as Ralph Blake
- Sheila Shand-Gibbs as Mavis Pink
- Glyn Houston as Ned Rutter
- Geoffrey Toone as Jack Bannerman
- Alexander Gauge as Ben Woodhall
- Frank Pettingell as Sir Julius
- Tommy Lawton as himself (cameo)

== Original play ==
The film was based on a play "Shooting Star" by Basil Thomas which premiered in 1949. Thomas was a football fan who decided to write a play about the transfer system. He says managers and directors were keen to co operate. Among the people Thomas interviewed were Ted Vizard, Stan Cullis and Claude Jephcott.

== Production ==
Film rights were bought by Adelphi who made a number of low budget comedies. They also made Is Your Honeymoon Really Necessary? with Dors.

== Critical reception ==
Picture Show called it an "unpretentious but most enjoyable comedy."

The Monthly Film Bulletin wrote: "This film falls between two stools. Those patrons who think they will see a fine display of football will be disappointed – there are only about three minutes of play in the whole film – while others expecting a sincere attempt to investigate the evils of transfer procedure will be bored by the film's stupidity. The humour is stale, and the only convincing acting comes from James Hayter and Thora Hird."

Kine Weekly wrote: "Straight-shooting soccer comedy drama, artfully approached from the woman's angle. It gets right behind the scenes of the nation's most popular game and exposes the evils of the transfer system through its leading characters, faultlessly portrayed, yet displays a keen sense of humour. Atmosphere is authentic, but director Maurice Elvey never gets offside by putting ball-play before human interest."

The Digital Fix found the film "largely insignificant and admittedly musters up little interest, but then it is offset with a gentle humour and plenty of broad comedy characterisation from its supporting cast; nobody could ogle Dors’ sexpot secretary quite like John Laurie does in the opening scene."

== 1949 TV adaptation ==
The play was filmed for TV in 1949.

=== Cast ===
- Derek Blomfield as Ned Rutter
- Colin Douglas as Jack Bannerman
- Charmian Eyre as Mavis Pink
- Raymond Francis as Mr Blake
- Heather Gratrix as Lulu Smith
- James Hayter as Joe Lawson
- Avice Landone as Miss Rawlings
- Cameron Miller as Wells
- Robert Perceval as Ben Woodhall
- Frank Pettitt as Skid Evans
- Ann Titheradge as Beryl Armstrong

== See also ==
- List of association football films
