= Betty Baskcomb =

British actress (1914–2003)

- Publicity still for It Always Rains on Sunday (1947)
- Born: Betty Violet Marie Baskcomb; 30 May 1914; St John's Wood, London; United Kingdom
- Died: 15 April 2003 (aged 88); West Wratting, Cambridgeshire; United Kingdom
- Education: RADA
- Occupation: Actor
- Years active: 1931–1975
- Spouses: Anthony Lehmann (m. 1940; died 1944) Ronald Ward (m. 1948; died 1978)
- Children: One daughter

Betty Violet Marie Baskcomb (30 May 1914 – 15 April 2003) was a British actress who appeared in roles for theatre, film, television and radio productions. She was born in London in 1914 and made her stage debut as a stooge opposite her father, the comedian A.W. Baskcomb, in 1931. Her screen debut was in the Hitchcock film The Man Who Knew Too Much (1934). Hitchcock insisted she played a part in the remake (released in 1956), and she was flown over to Hollywood for the role, although she was uncredited in both versions. On the radio, she was a member of the BBC Drama Repertory Company from the 1940s through to the 1970s. In 1956 she appeared on stage in Ring For Catty at the Lyric Theatre in London.

Baskcomb was widowed twice, she was married to Anthony Lehmann (1940–1944) and the actor Ronald Ward (1948–1978). She made her last television appearance in 1975, and died in 2003.

== Filmography ==
Year	Title	Role	Notes
1934	The Man Who Knew Too Much	The Lawrences' Maid	Uncredited
1935	The Passing of the Third Floor Back	Minor Role	Uncredited
1947	It Always Rains on Sunday	Barmaid of the 'Two Compasses'	
1952	Tread Softly	Olivia Winter	
1954	Father Brown	French Widow	
1956	The Man Who Knew Too Much	Edna, the Church Organist	Uncredited
1960	Your Money or Your Wife	Janet Fry	
1963	Dr. Crippen	Mrs. Stratton	Uncredited
