= Five Days (1954 film) =

1954 British film by Montgomery Tully

- Theatrical release poster
- Directed by: Montgomery Tully
- Written by: Paul Tabori
- Produced by: Anthony Hinds
- Starring: Dane Clark; Paul Carpenter; Thea Gregory; Anthony Forwood
- Cinematography: Walter J. Harvey; Len Harris
- Edited by: James Needs
- Music by: Ivor Slaney
- Production company: Hammer Film Productions
- Distributed by: Exclusive Films; Lippert Pictures (US)
- Release date: 25 June 1954 (UK)
- Running time: 72 minutes (UK); 75 minutes (US)
- Country: United Kingdom
- Language: English

Five Days (U.S. title: Paid to Kill) is a 1954 British second feature ('B') film noir directed by Montgomery Tully and starring Dane Clark, Paul Carpenter and Thea Gregory. It was written by Paul Tabori and produced by Anthony Hinds for Hammer Film Productions. Jimmy Sangster was assistant director, J. Elder Wills was art director, and Phil Leakey handled makeup. Dane Clark had finished starring in Hammer's Murder by Proxy and was supposed to return to the US to star in some Westerns, but Anthony Hinds persuaded him to stay in England to star in Five Days. Filming ran from Nov. 9, 1953 to Dec. 16, 1953, and it was trade shown on May 12, 1954 at the Hammer Theatre. It was released in the United States by Lippert Pictures. The US print (retitled Paid to Kill) ran 3 minutes longer than the British print.

== Plot ==
James Nevill, a financially ruined businessman, hires his boyhood friend Paul Kirby to kill him within five days so his wife Andrea can collect on his life insurance policy. Kirby refuses at first, but Nevill forces him to take the job by threatening to tell the police about a murder Kirby had committed years earlier. Nevill's business takes a sudden upswing however, and he changes his mind, but he must find Kirby (who has suddenly disappeared) and tell him to cancel the hit before Kirby gets to him first. Nevill suffers four attempts on his life before he suspects that Kirby isn't the only one out there trying to kill him. He learns that his boss Mr. Glanville has been having an affair with Andrea, and when Glanville learned of Kirby's being hired to kill Nevill, Glanville kidnapped Kirby and had him imprisoned somewhere. Next he's planning to kill Nevill and Kirby both, letting the police find both bodies together, making it look like a murder/suicide. Then he and Andrea plan to collect the insurance money and elope. But Nevill grabs the gun, shoots Andrea by mistake, and Glanville is turned over to the police.

== Cast ==
- Dane Clark as James Nevill
- Cecile Chevreau as Joan Peterson
- Paul Carpenter as Paul Kirby
- Thea Gregory as Andrea Nevill
- Anthony Forwood as Glanville
- Arthur Young as Hyson
- Howard Marion-Crawford as Cyrus McGowan
- Arnold Diamond as Perkins
- Charles Hawtrey as Bill
- Peter Gawthorne as Bowman
- Avis Scott as Eileen
- Geoffrey Sumner as Chapter
- Ross Hutchinson as Ingham
- Martin Lawrence as Grover the masseur
- Leslie Wright as Hunter
- Larry Taylor as tough in bar
- Warren Mitchell as laughing man in bar
- Hugo Schuster as Professor

== Production ==
The film was shot at Bray Studios with sets designed by the art director J. Elder Wills.

== Critical reception ==
The Monthly Film Bulletin wrote: "The neat plot is spoilt by a weak script, and not all the forceful intensity of the American star, Dane Clark, can save this pedestrian piece. The British players in support scarcely seem to try. The direction is uneven, scenes are put together with little sense of movement or continuity, and the result is a thriller below the average."

Kine Weekly wrote: "The central idea is far-fetched, but sound acting and direction enables its 'thick ear' to acquire an intriguing and thrilling facade. Definitely the masses' cup of tea. ...The picture puts a considerable strain upon the credulity of the audience, but the sensational twist ending prevents it from reaching breaking point."

In British Sound Films: The Studio Years 1928–1959 David Quinlan rated the film as "average", writing: "Good plot, assorted acting, poor script."
