= Burnt Evidence =

1954 British film by Daniel Birt

- British quad poster
- Directed by: Daniel Birt
- Screenplay by: Ted Willis
- Based on: Burn the Evidence by Percy Hoskins
- Produced by: Ronald Kinnoch
- Starring: Jane Hylton; Duncan Lamont; Meredith Edwards; Donald Gray
- Cinematography: Jo Jago
- Edited by: W.J. Lewthwaite
- Production company: ACT Films
- Distributed by: Monarch Film Corporation
- Release date: 5 July 1954
- Running time: 61 minutes
- Country: United Kingdom
- Language: English

Burnt Evidence is a 1954 British second feature thriller film directed by Daniel Birt and starring Jane Hylton, Duncan Lamont and Donald Gray. The screenplay was by Ted Willis. It was produced by Ronald Kinnoch for ACT Films.

== Plot ==
Diana Taylor is considering leaving her husband, Jack, who has been trying but failing to build his own business as a builder/decorator. Her suitor, Jimmy Thompson, is Jack's army friend. Jack deduces the relationship and, when Jimmy comes to Jack's business to discuss the situation, a fight ensues. A gun is produced and one of them is killed, but a subsequent fire makes it difficult to determine which man has died. While the police search for the survivor, Diana struggles with her feelings.

== Cast ==
- Jane Hylton as Diana Taylor
- Duncan Lamont as Jack Taylor
- Donald Gray as Jimmy Thompson
- Meredith Edwards as Bob Edwards
- Cyril Smith as Alf Quinney
- Irene Handl as Mrs. Raymond
- Hugo Schuster as Hartl
- Kynaston Reeves as pathologist
- Hugh Moxey as Assistant Commissioner
- Tony Hilton as Tubby
- Stanley Vilven as Attwood
- Hamilton Keene as fire officer
- Gwen Bacon as Mrs. Thompson
- Jack Taylor as Detective Sergeant Dutton
- Arthur Lovegrove as fireman
- Stratford Johns as fireman

== Production ==
Shooting took place at Beaconsfield Studios and on location in Hammersmith. The film's sets were designed by art director Ray Simm.

== Critical reception ==
The Monthly Film Bulletin wrote: "A low-budget thriller, with obvious limitations. The story is at once too unlikely and yet too easily anticipated to make for real excitement, and the direction is pedestrian."

Kine Weekly wrote: "Run-of-the-mill mystery melodrama, unfolded in suburbia. It rings the changes on the eternal triangle theme, but lacks both punch and surprise. Interplay of character is, however, neat and takes up much of the slack."

Picturegoer wrote: "As British thrillers go, this is agreeable."

In British Sound Films: The Studio Years 1928–1959 David Quinlan rated the film as "mediocre" and wrote: "Glum, plodding, low-budget thriller.''

Sky Cinema called it a "Relentlessly sombre thriller."
