= House of Blackmail =

1953 British film by Maurice Elvey

- Directed by: Maurice Elvey
- Written by: Allan MacKinnon
- Produced by: Philip Brandon
- Starring: William Sylvester; Mary Germaine
- Cinematography: Phil Grindrod
- Edited by: Vera Campbell
- Music by: John Addison
- Production company: ACT Films
- Distributed by: Monarch Film Corporation (UK)
- Release date: 1956
- Running time: 72 minutes
- Country: United Kingdom
- Language: English

House of Blackmail is a 1953 British second feature drama film directed by Maurice Elvey and starring Mary Germaine, William Sylvester and Alexander Gauge. It was written by Allan MacKinnon. The plot follows a soldier and his girlfriend, who become mixed up with a blackmailer.

== Plot ==
Playboy Billy Blane forges crook John Markham's signature on a cheque. Markham demands £5000 hush money from Blane. Blane asks his sister Carol for help. She drives to Markham's country house and en route picks up hitchhiker Jimmy, who agrees to pose as her lawyer. When Carol gives Markham a cheque, he demands that Carol and Jim remain at the house until the cheque clears. Carol persuades Jimmy to crack Markham's safe, which he finds empty. Markham is found murdered. It is revealed that Jimmy is an Army officer on an initiative test. He unmasks the murderer.

== Cast ==
- Mary Germaine as Carol Blane
- William Sylvester as Jimmy
- Alexander Gauge as John Markham
- John Arnatt as Pete Carter
- Denis Shaw as Bassett
- Ingeborg von Kusserow as Emma
- Patricia Owens as Joan
- C. Denier Warren as Jock
- Hugo Schuster as Dr. Welich
- Barry Wynne as Billy Blane

== Critical reception ==
Kine Weekly said "The picture ... opens well, but as soon as it moves to Markham's mansion its action becomes a trifle stilted, Mary Germaine, as Carol, displays good looks and obvious acting ability, and William Sylvester, although a little too sure of himself, registers as Jimmy, but the rest are a very mixed bag. Even so, the sound stellar portrayals, coupled with the 'twist' ending, give it the benefit of any doubts."

Monthly Film Bulletin said "John Markham, a blackmailer, is murdered. Whodunit? The German doctor? The fake American? The supposed escaped convict? The wealthy commercial artist? The pugilistic butler or the demure maid? The police cannot be called in, as the house is surrounded by a high-tension circuit, and someone removed at least 18 inches from the telephone wire, so we have to spend about 40 minutes finding out. Of the cast, only Ingeborg Wells and Denis Shaw show any spirit, and direction is not particularly in evidence."

In British Sound Films: The Studio Years 1928–1959 David Quinlan rated the film as "mediocre", writing: "Very modest version of traditional thriller."

The Radio Times wrote: "Not one of [Maurice Elvey's] best efforts. We could do with more surprises, but the pace is unrelenting and there are typically solid performances from Mary Germaine, William Sylvester and John Arnatt."

TV Guide called it "ordinary but fast paced."
