= The Night Won't Talk =

- Directed by: Daniel Birt
- Written by: Roger Burford; Brock Williams
- Produced by: Harold Richmond
- Starring: John Bailey; Hy Hazell; Mary Germaine
- Cinematography: Brendan J. Stafford
- Edited by: John Seabourne
- Music by: Gilbert Vinter
- Production company: Corsair Pictures
- Distributed by: Associated British-Pathé
- Release date: October 1952
- Running time: 61 minutes
- Country: United Kingdom
- Language: English

The Night Won't Talk is a 1952 British second feature ('B') crime film directed by Daniel Birt and starring John Bailey, Hy Hazell and Mary Germaine. It was written by Roger Burford and Brock Williams. The murder of an artist's model leads the police to investigate the artistic community of Chelsea.

== Plot ==
When artist's model Stella Smith is murdered, the police visit Bohemian meeting-place the Portrait Club. Now in love with Hazel Carr, another model, Stella's fiancé Clayton Hawkes is suspected of the crime by Inspector West. When Hazel too narrowly escapes murder, the Inspector set a trap to catch the criminal.

== Cast ==
- John Bailey as Clayton Hawkes
- Hy Hazell as Theodora Castle
- Mary Germaine as Hazel Carr
- Sarah Lawson as Sue / Susan
- Elwyn Brook-Jones as Martin Soames
- Ballard Berkeley as Inspector West
- Hélène Burls as Mrs. Vincent
- Leslie Weston
- Grey Blake
- Duncan Lamont as Sergeant Robbins
- Raymond Young
- Susan Pearson

== Production ==
It was made at Kensington Studios with sets designed by the art director Bernard Robinson.

== Critical reception ==
The Monthly Film Bulletin wrote: "A moderately exciting thriller. Plot and backgrounds are too obvious, and spoil the sincerity of the performances."

Kine Weekly wrote: "Smoothly carpentered, competently acted, smartly dialogued and authentically staged, it carries more conviction and a greater kick than many a thriller twice its size. Very good British support. ... The picture not only succeeds in creating a number of red herrings, but has a plausible as well as exciting, climax. Hy Hazell, Mary Germaine, Elwyn Brook-Jones and Ballard Berkeley are particularly good as Theo, Hazel, Soames and West respectively. The supporting players are also above average and complete a cast that definitely deserves the attention of all talent scouts. The lines, too, have polish, while the backgrounds meet most demands, It was directed by Daniel Birt with economy, intelligence and showmanship."

In British Sound Films: The Studio Years 1928–1959 David Quinlan rated the film as "average", writing: "Although the ending is obvious, not bad for a British crime 'B' of the time."

TV Guide wrote, "Though a touch predictable, this film is fairly intelligent for a minor crime thriller."
