= Molly and Me =

1945 film by Lewis Seiler

- Directed by: Lewis Seiler
- Screenplay by: Leonard Praskins; Roger Burford (adaptation)
- Based on: Molly, Bless Her; 1937 novel by Frances Marion
- Produced by: Robert Bassler
- Starring: Monty Woolley; Gracie Fields; Reginald Gardiner; Roddy McDowall
- Cinematography: Charles G. Clarke
- Edited by: John W. McCafferty
- Music by: Cyril J. Mockridge
- Distributed by: Twentieth Century-Fox Film Corporation
- Release date: May 25, 1945
- Running time: 76 minutes
- Country: United States
- Language: English

Molly and Me is a 1945 American comedy film directed by Lewis Seiler and starring Monty Woolley, Gracie Fields, Reginald Gardiner and Roddy McDowall and released by 20th Century Fox. The screenplay was based on the novel written by Frances Marion and adapted by Roger Burford.

== Plot ==
The full film

In 1937 London, struggling vaudeville actress Molly Barry grows tired of searching for roles and applies for a job as housekeeper for upper class gentleman John Graham. She informs her friends and fellow actors, Lily and Julia, about her plans, and persuades former exotic dancer Kitty Goode, who has married into the peerage, to provide a fake reference.

Graham's butler, Peabody, interviews Molly. But when Kitty shows up, Peabody recognises her, as he himself is really former actor Harry Phillips. Harry had given up acting because of a drinking problem, which he has since conquered. He does not want another former actor in the household. Desperate, Molly persuades Peabody to join a party at a pub, where he falls off the wagon. She brings the half-unconscious man back to the Graham house, occupies the housekeeper's room, and in the morning informs Mr. Graham that Peabody has hired her. Peabody has no other alternative but to go along.

Graham's old friend, Jamie McDougall, asks him to stand again for Parliament. Graham is reluctant to do so and shows an old newspaper clipping to McDougall, reminding him that Graham ended his political career to avoid public disgrace after his wife ran off with a "sportsman." McDougall burns the clipping in the fireplace and tells Graham it all happened 15 years ago and will not be remembered.

Graham is convinced to travel to Suffolk to meet a man who could be of great help in his election bid. While they are gone, Molly discovers that the domestic staff all steal from the household. When she confronts them, they threaten to quit en masse, but she sacks them instead. Molly puts the house in order by herself. From a fragment of the clipping she finds, Molly learns the truth about Graham's ex-wife, who went abroad because of the scandal.

That night, Graham's teenage son Jimmy unexpectedly returns home from prep school. Jimmy suffers from a fever and Molly takes care of him. Jimmy confides in Molly his difficulties with his father. While he was young, Jimmy was told that his mother died and is convinced that Graham does not like him because he is a constant reminder of it.

The next day, Peabody sends Molly a telegram telling her to prepare a formal dinner to which influential Sir Arthur Burroughs, publisher of a big London newspaper, will be a guest. Unable to find professional help on short notice, Molly hires her theatre friends. Despite their numerous mistakes, the dinner is a success. The new staff celebrate in the kitchen, particularly pleased that the common English fare Molly improvised for dinner impressed Sir Arthur much more than food "of subtlety and distinction".

Graham goes to the kitchen to congratulate them, but overhears Jimmy imitating his gruff pomposity and sour outlook. He sends Jimmy to bed and sacks the staff, including Peabody, when he learns from Molly that they are former entertainers. Molly then scolds Graham for being a poor father to his teenage son. By the next morning, Graham has reconsidered and gives his son permission to re-hire the staff.

The former Mrs. Graham resurfaces to try to extort £1000 from her former husband. Molly tells her he is asleep, but promises to inform him of the sum she wants. Molly tells Graham that "something has happened," but before she can go into detail, he assures her that he has full confidence in her ability to fix any problem. Molly uses her friends to fool Mrs. Graham into thinking that she has been a participant in a shooting death. Mrs. Graham flees the country.

Later that same evening, Graham and Jimmy return home after attending a theater performance. Graham later remarks that he has been spoiled by Mrs. Barry's late night snacks and wonders if she could fix him another one, preferably in the kitchen. They sit down together, happily singing a song.

== Cast ==
- Monty Woolley as John Graham
- Gracie Fields as Molly Barry
- Reginald Gardiner as Harry Phillips/Peabody
- Roddy McDowall as Jimmy Graham
- Natalie Schafer as Kitty Goode-Burroughs
- Edith Barrett as Julia
- Clifford Brooke as Pops
- Aminta Dyne as Musette
- Queenie Leonard as Lily
- Doris Lloyd as Mrs Graham
- Patrick O'Moore as Ronnie
- Lewis L. Russell as Sir Arthur Burroughs
- David Clyde as Angus, the Gardener
- Matthew Boulton as Sergeant
- Gordon Richards as Jamie McDougall

== Reception ==
Variety gave the film a favorable review: "It is neatly studded with belly-laugh material as well as effective bits of pathos. Above all, it holds an excellent all-round cast topped by Gracie Fields, Monty Woolley, Roddy McDowall and Reginald Gardiner."
