= Profile (1954 film) =

British thriller by Francis Searle

- Directed by: Francis Searle
- Written by: John Temple-Smith; Maurice Temple-Smith; John Gilling
- Produced by: John Temple-Smith; Francis Edge
- Starring: John Bentley; Kathleen Byron; Thea Gregory
- Cinematography: Brendan J. Stafford
- Edited by: Tom Simpson
- Production company: Major Pictures
- Distributed by: Monarch Film Corporation
- Release date: 13 September 1954
- Running time: 65 minutes
- Country: United Kingdom
- Language: English

Profile is a 1954 British second feature ('B') thriller film directed by Francis Searle and starring John Bentley, Kathleen Byron and Thea Gregory. It was written by John Temple-Smith, Maurice Temple-Smith and John Gilling.

The story concerns a murder mystery set in a magazine publishers.

== Plot ==
Aubrey Holland is a rich publisher and about to announce a new magazine, Profile. His wife Margot is only interested in him for his money, and unsuccessfully tries to woo handsome editor Peter Armstrong. As Profile launches, Aubrey unexpectedly dies of a heart attack. Peter is charged with embezzlement. Margot is murdered. The police search for the killer.

== Cast ==
- John Bentley as Peter
- Kathleen Byron as Margot
- Thea Gregory as Susan
- Stuart Lindsell as Aubrey
- Ivan Craig as Jerry
- Garard Green as Charlie
- Lloyd Lamble as Michael
- Frank Henderson as Mr. Freeman
- Arnold Bell as Inspector Crawford
- Charles Saynor as policeman
- Derek Prentice as doctor
- June Charlier as barmaid

== Production ==
The film was shot at Shepperton Studios, with sets designed by the art director Norman G. Arnold.

== Critical reception ==
Kine Weekly said: "Compact, competently acted and elegantly staged. ... Sacred and profane love commingle in intriguing alchemy as it smoothly builds up to a dramatic dénouement."

Monthly Film Bulletin wrote: "Formula murder story set against the background of a magazine publisher. The dialogue and playing are up to standard, but the film has, for its length, a somewhat confused and over-complicated plot."

Chibnall and McFarlane in The British 'B' Film describe the film as: "a lame murder mystery set in the world of magazine publishing."

In British Sound Films: The Studio Years 1928–1959, David Quinlan rated the film as "mediocre", writing: "Tortuous thriller."

The Radio Times Guide to Films gave the film 1/5 stars, writing: "Steel-jawed magazine editor John Bentley is accused of forging a cheque in the name of his publisher, who inconveniently keels over with a heart attack. Meanwhile, the publisher's wife (a totally wasted Kathleen Byron) lusts after Bentley (who's in love with her daughter), but is soon murdered herself. Rubbish? You bet, from Monarch, one of the lowest on the British B-movie totem pole: don't look for style here."
