= Hugo Schuster =

German-British actor (1886–1976)

- Born: 22 November 1886; Aachen, Germany
- Died: 10 July 1976 (aged 89); London, UK
- Occupation: Actor

Hugo Schuster (22 November 1886 – 10 July 1976) was a German-British actor.

== Biography ==
Born in Aachen, Germany, Schuster began his career acting at Otto Brahm's Berlin Lessing Theater. In the 1920s, he acted in the leading German theatres. After 1945, he had roles in English theatre plays, films, television, and radio - such as the BBC German service. From 1956 to 1963 he lived in Germany, acting in German productions. However, he did not feel at peace in post-war Germany and returned to his home in Golders Green.

== Personal life ==
Hugo married actress, Sybil Rares.

== Filmography ==
Year	Title	Role	Notes
1944	Hotel Reserve	Inspector	Uncredited
1949	Portrait from Life	Interpreter	
1949	The Third Man	Waiter	Uncredited
1950	Prelude to Fame	Dr. Freihaus	
1952	Secret People	General Galbern	
1953	House of Blackmail	Dr. Welich	
1954	Father Brown	Optician	
1954	Five Days	Professor	Uncredited
1954	Burnt Evidence	Hartl	
1955	Secret Venture	Professor Henrik	
1966	The Blue Max	Hans. Elderly Servant	
1967	The Prisoner	Professor Jacob Seltzman	Episode: Do Not Forsake Me Oh My Darling
