= Maysie Coucher Greig =

Australian novelist

Maysie Greig

Maysie Coucher Greig (pen names, Jennifer Ames, Ann Barclay, and Mary Douglas Warren; 2 August 1901 – 10 June 1971) was an Australian writer of romantic novels and thrillers. In the 1930s, she wrote under the names Jennifer Ames, Ann Barclay and Mary Douglas Warren and she was considered the most prolific woman novelist of the time.

== Biography ==
Greig was born at Double Bay, Sydney. Her father was Robert Greig Smith, a bacteriologist from Edinburgh, and her mother Mary had been born in England. Greig attended Pymble Ladies' College. In 1919 Greig took a position at The Sun newspaper, and the following year she moved to England and worked on evening newspapers in Manchester. By October 1922 she had her own column in the Empire News, titled 'The Woman's View'.

In 1923, Greig moved to New York City and Boston and began writing novels. Her first were written under the name Maysie Greig: Peggy of Beacon Hill (1924) and The Luxury Husband (1927). Both were later turned into Hollywood films. After a period of traveling to places such as Yugoslavia and Albania, she settled in England and began writing again; by 1934, she was publishing up to six books a year and was considered the most prolific woman novelist of the day. She wrote thrillers under the name Jennifer Ames, and also wrote under the names Ann Barclay and Mary Douglas Warren. Her books were published by Collins in England and Doubleday in New York and they were translated into French, Dutch, Portuguese, Swedish and Icelandic.

In 1948, Greig moved to Sydney and continued to write, producing four books a year. Some of these novels had Australian settings, including One Room for His Highness (1947), French Girl in Love (1963) and Doctor on Wings (1966). She joined the Sydney chapter of International P.E.N. and served as its president until 1966. She was also a member of the Society of Women Writers of New South Wales, the Fellowship of Australian Writers and the Romantic Novelists' Association (England).

In 1966, Greig moved back to London and lived there until her death of an embolism on 10 June 1971.

== Personal life ==
In July 1923, Greig married Ernest Roscoe Baltzell, an American Rhodes scholar. They were divorced in 1929. She later married American writer Delano Ames, divorcing in 1937. In the same year, she married Maxwell Alexander Murray, an Australian-born journalist. They had a son in 1940. In 1959, after Murray's death in 1956, she married Jan Sopoushek, a printer from Budapest.
