= Rona Anderson =

British actress (1926–2013)

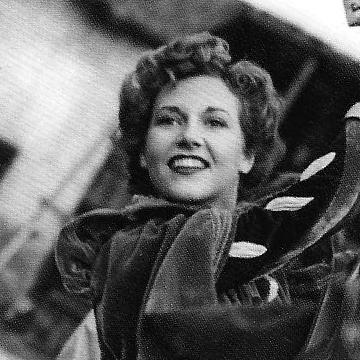
- Anderson in 1949
- Born: 3 August 1926; Edinburgh, Scotland
- Died: 23 July 2013 (aged 86); London, England
- Years active: 1948–2013
- Spouse: Gordon Jackson (m. 1951; died 1990)
- Children: 2

Rona Anderson (3 August 1926 – 23 July 2013) was a Scottish stage, film, and television actress. She appeared in TV series and on the stage and films throughout the 1950s. She appeared in the films Scrooge and The Prime of Miss Jean Brodie and on TV in Dr. Finlay's Casebook and Dixon of Dock Green.

== Biography ==
Rona Anderson was born in Edinburgh to James and Evelyn (née Thomson) Anderson. She was educated in her home town and briefly in Ottawa during the war. She trained for the stage at the Glover Turner-Robertson School in Edinburgh.

In 1951, she married fellow actor Gordon Jackson, with whom she had appeared in Floodtide (1949) and remained with him until his death in 1990.

== Stage work ==
Anderson had an English accent despite being brought up in Scotland. She made her first appearance on the stage at the Garrison Theatre in April 1945 in a production of Peg o' My Heart. From 1945 through 1949, she played various parts with the Glasgow Citizens Theatre. At the 1950 Edinburgh Festival, Anderson played the role of Venus in a production of The Queen's Comedy. She made her London debut in October 1951 at the Piccadilly Theatre in The White Sheep of the Family. Anderson went on two tours in 1955. In March of that year, she toured as Sabrina in Sabrina Fair. In September 1955, she toured as Mary in All for Mary.

In October 1958, she played Mary Tufnell in Once a Rake at the Theatre Royal, Windsor. Anderson appeared in the premier of Savages in 1973. She appeared at the Mermaid Theatre in their 1978 production of Whose Life Is It Anyway?, which transferred to the Savoy Theatre. In 1981, she played Frances Shand Kydd in the Ray Cooney comedy, Her Royal Highness at the Palace Theatre, London starring Marc Sinden.

== Television ==
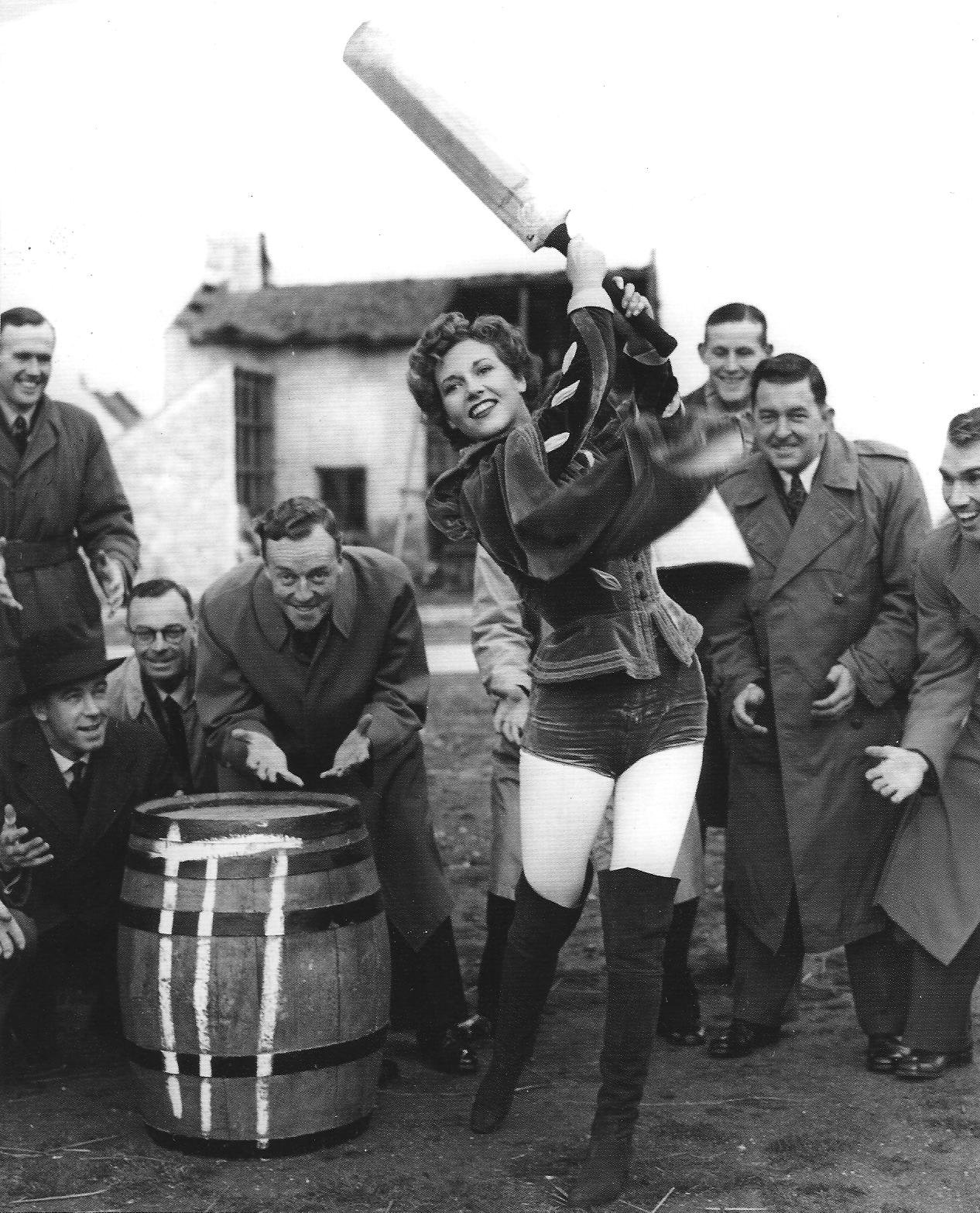
Rona Anderson posing with leading members of the New Zealand cricket team

From 1953 until 1983, Anderson appeared in several British television programmes. She played Agnes Maclehose in the second television dramatisation of Robert Kemp's The Other Dear Charmer, about Maclehose's love affair with Robert Burns, produced by Pharic Maclaren for the bicentenary of Burns' birth and first broadcast on the BBC-tv network on Tuesday 27 January 1959.

Anderson appeared in three episodes of The Human Jungle (1964–1965) during its second season. Anderson played the role of Mary on the British sitcom Bachelor Father (1970–1971). Anderson later appeared in an episode of the long-running crime series The Professionals entitled Cry Wolf, in which her husband, Gordon Jackson, played George Cowley.

== Film career ==
Rona Anderson's first major film was the drama Sleeping Car to Trieste (1948) directed by John Paddy Carstairs. Anderson played the role of Alice (originally named "Belle" by Dickens) in Scrooge (1951), a film adaptation of Charles Dickens's A Christmas Carol. She appeared alongside Lee Patterson in Man with a Gun (1958), directed by Montgomery Tully, while her last major film appearance was in The Prime of Miss Jean Brodie (1969). Following this film she continued her work on the stage and in television series.

=== Critical assessment ===
Of her numerous roles in British B films in the 1950s, the film historians Steve Chibnall and Brian McFarlane wrote: "She was essentially crisp and wholesome, in her open Scots prettiness and brought a proper spirited resourcefulness to these assorted plucky heroines, making them a good deal more endearing and credible than the screenplays deserved."

== Personal life and death ==
Anderson was married to the actor Gordon Jackson from 1951 until his death in 1990.

Anderson died on 23 July 2013, aged 86.

== Selected filmography ==
- Sleeping Car to Trieste (1948) – Joan Maxted
- Floodtide (1949) – Mary Anstruther
- Poet's Pub (1949) – Joanna Benbow
- The Twenty Questions Murder Mystery (1950) – Mary Game
- Torment (1950) – Joan
- Her Favourite Husband (1950) – Stellina
- Home to Danger (1951) – Barbara Cummings
- Scrooge (1951) – Alice
- Whispering Smith Hits London (1952) – Anne
- Circumstantial Evidence (1952) – Linda Harrison
- Noose for a Lady (1953) – Jill Hallam
- Black 13 (1953) – Claire
- Double Exposure (1954)
- The Black Rider (1954) – Mary Plack
- Stock Car (1955) – Katie Glebe
- Little Red Monkey (1955) – Julia Jackson
- The Flaw (1955) – Monica Oliveri
- A Time to Kill (1955) – Sallie Harbord
- Shadow of a Man (1956) – Linda Bryant
- Soho Incident (aka Spin a Dark Web) (1956) – Betty Walker
- Man with a Gun (1958) – Stella
- Devils of Darkness (1965) – Anne
- River Rivals (1967)
- The Prime of Miss Jean Brodie (1969) – Miss Lockhart
