= Ronald Ward (actor) =

British actor (1901–1978)

- 1936 Spotlight photo (by Walter Bird)
- Born: 5 April 1901; Eastbourne, Sussex, England
- Died: 31 March 1978 (aged 76); London, England
- Years active: 1922–1956
- Spouses: Peggy Willoughby; Betty Baskcomb (m. 1948)
- Children: Michael Ward

Ronald Ward (5 April 1901 – 31 March 1978) was a British actor who, alongside his stage work, appeared in more than twenty British films between 1931 and 1956. He was born in Eastbourne in 1901 as Ronald William Ward, and made his screen debut in the 1931 film Alibi. One of his biggest roles was in the popular Vera Lynn vehicle We'll Meet Again (1943), where he was effectively the male lead (although he was billed fourth), co-starring with Lynn and Patricia Roc.

His final marriage was to the actress Betty Baskcomb; and he was father of photographer Michael Ward.

== Partial filmography ==
- Alibi (1931) - Ralph Ackroyd
- Love's Old Sweet Song (1933) - Eric Kingslake
- Brides to Be (1934) - George Hutton
- Girls Will Be Boys (1934) - Bernard
- The Broken Rosary (1934) - Jack
- The Passing of the Third Floor Back (1935) - Chris Penny
- The Man Behind the Mask (1936) - Jimmy Slade
- East Meets West (1936) - Neville Carter
- Strange Experiment (1937) - Michael Waring
- Splinters in the Air (1937) - Richards
- Stardust (1938) - Eric Williams
- Sidewalks of London (1938) - Jack Temperley
- Goodbye, Mr. Chips (1939) - (uncredited)
- The Proud Valley (1940) - Sir John (uncredited)
- Confidential Lady (1940) - John Canter
- Turned Out Nice Again (1941) - Nelson
- This England (1941) - Lord Clavely
- We'll Meet Again (1943) - Frank
- Escape to Danger (1943) - Rupert Chessman
- They Met in the Dark (1943) - Carter
- Carnival (1946) - Jack Danby
- Green for Danger (1946) - Minor Role (uncredited)
- My Daughter Joy (1950) - Dr. Schindler
- The Second Mrs. Tanqueray (1952) - Cayley Drummie
- The Straw Man (1953) - Clay Rushlow (scenes deleted)
- The Rainbow Jacket (1954) - Bernie Rudd
- Aunt Clara (1954) - Cyril Mason
- Lost (1956) - Military Man (uncredited) (final film role)
