= Escape to Danger =

1943 British film by Lance Comfort and Victor Hanbury

- Directed by: Lance Comfort; Victor Hanbury
- Written by: Jack Whittingham; Wolfgang Wilhelm; Patrick Kirwan (story)
- Produced by: William Sistrom
- Starring: Eric Portman; Ann Dvorak
- Cinematography: Guy Green
- Edited by: Edward B. Jarvis (as E. Jarvis)
- Music by: William Alwyn
- Production company: RKO Radio British Productions
- Distributed by: RKO
- Release date: 12 July 1943
- Running time: 84 minutes
- Country: United Kingdom
- Language: English

Escape to Danger (also known as Murder in a Convoy) is a 1943 British thriller film directed by Lance Comfort and Victor Hanbury and starring Eric Portman, Ann Dvorak and Karel Stepanek. It was written by Jack Whittingham and Wolfgang Wilhelm from a story by Patrick Kirwan.

== Plot ==
During the Second World War a British schoolteacher working in Denmark is caught up when the Germans invade.

== Cast ==
- Eric Portman as Arthur Lawrence
- Ann Dvorak as Joan Grahame
- Karel Stepanek as Franz von Brinkman
- Ronald Ward as Rupert Chessman
- Ronald Adam as George Merrick
- Felix Aylmer as Sir Alfred Horton
- Brefni O'Rorke as security officer
- A. E. Matthews as Sir Thomas Leighton
- Ivor Barnard as Henry Waud
- David Peel as Lt. Peter Leighton
- Charles Victor as Petty Officer Flanagan
- George Merritt as works manager
- Marjorie Rhodes as Mrs. Pickles
- John Ruddock as Jim
- Frederick Cooper as Gösta

== Critical reception ==
The Monthly Film Bulletin wrote: "The film has a certain amount of topical interest, but many of the situations are over-familiar. Joan and Lawrence are stock characters and it is difficult to be deeply interested in their adventures. Eric Portman is more convincing as Anthony than Ann Dvorak in a colourless portrayal of Joan. The final scenes are the best part, working to the climax of the sailing of the invasion fleet."

Kine Weekly called the film "a powerful, modern story teeming with adventure and thrilling action with an ingenious plot."

Picturegoer wrote: "Supporting cast is good and on the whole it is a good example of spy melodrama."

Picture Show called it "a very fine thriller."

Variety wrote: "This RKO British-made production, another in the Nazi spy cycle, is excellent entertainment. Building to a gripping climax, it's geared for good grosses both in home and foreign markets."

TV Guide wrote, "WW II espionage tale was timely for its day but has dated."
