= Meredith Edwards (actor) =

Welsh actor (1917–1999)

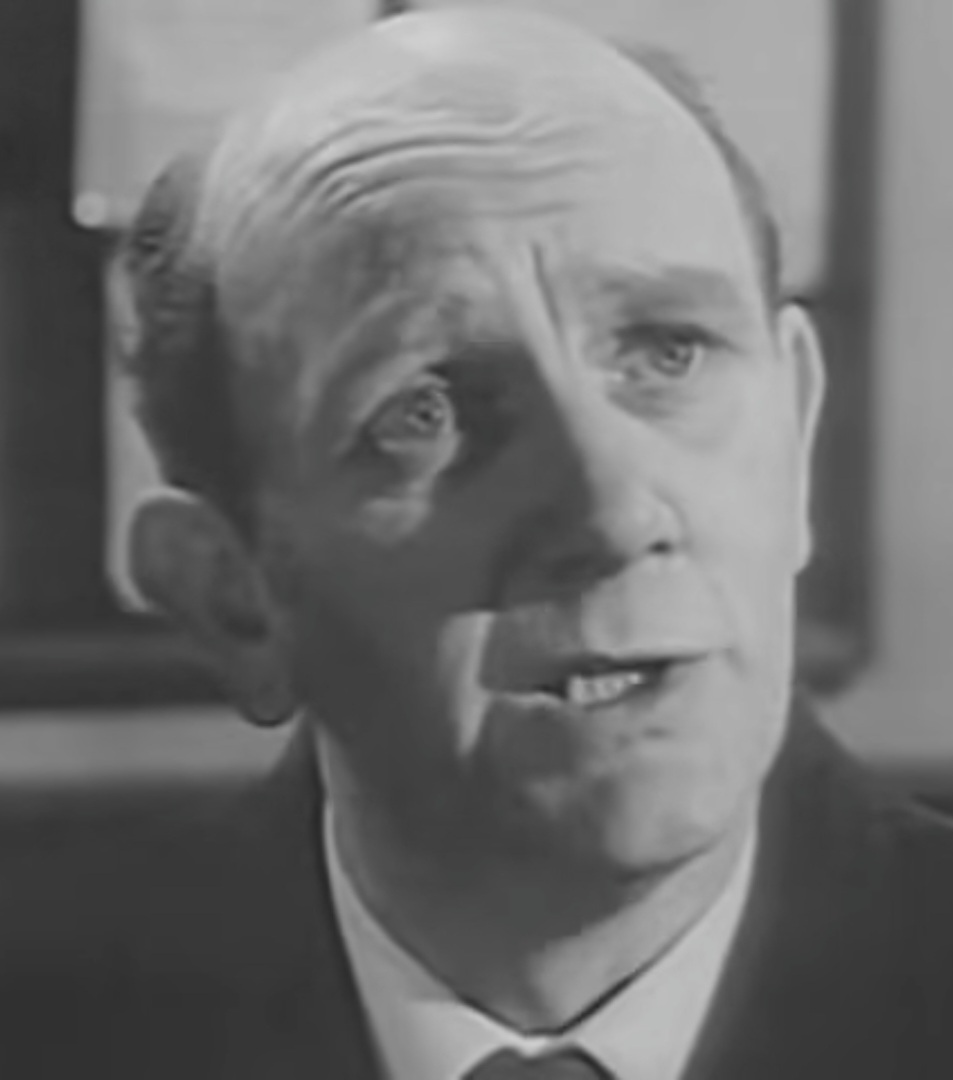
- Edwards in an episode of One Step Beyond (1960)
- Born: Gwilym Meredith Edwards; 10 June 1917; Rhosllannerchrugog, Denbighshire, Wales, UK
- Died: 8 February 1999 (aged 81); Denbighshire, Wales, UK
- Occupation: Actor
- Years active: 1949–1997
- Spouse: Daisy Clark (1942–1999) (his death)
- Children: 3
- Relatives: Ifan Meredith (grandson)

Gwilym Meredith Edwards (10 June 1917 – 8 February 1999) was a Welsh character actor and writer.

He was born in Rhosllannerchrugog, Denbighshire, Wales, the son of a collier, and attended Ruabon Boys' Grammar School. He became an actor in 1938, first with the Welsh National Theatre Company, then the Liverpool Playhouse. He was a Christian conscientious objector in the Second World War, serving in the Non-Combatant Corps, before being seconded to the National Fire Service in Liverpool and London.

Edwards' film appearances include A Run for Your Money (1949), The Blue Lamp (1950), The Magnet (1950), The Lavender Hill Mob (1951), The Cruel Sea (1953), The Great Game (1953), The Long Arm (1956), Dunkirk (1958) and Tiger Bay (1959). He appeared as the murderous butler in the cult television series Randall and Hopkirk (Deceased) in 1969, and as Tom in the cult children's science fiction serial Sky in 1975. He also played Thomas Charles Edwards in the 1978 BBC drama series Off to Philadelphia in the Morning and Richard Lloyd in the 1981 TV series The Life and Times of David Lloyd George.

A Welsh nationalist and Welsh speaker, he stood as Plaid Cymru candidate for Denbigh in the 1966 general election. He was awarded an honorary degree in 1997 by the University of Wales, and was a member of the Gorsedd of Bards.

He married Daisy Clark in 1942. They had two sons and a daughter. He is the father of actor Ioan Meredith and the grandfather of actors Ifan Meredith and Rhys Meredith.

== Partial filmography ==
- A Run for Your Money (1949) – Twm
- The Blue Lamp (1950) – PC Hughes
- The Magnet (1950) – Harper
- Midnight Episode (1950) – Detective Sergeant Taylor
- There Is Another Sun (1951) – Bratcher
- The Lavender Hill Mob (1951) – P.C. Williams
- Where No Vultures Fly (1951) – Gwyl Davis
- The Last Page (1952) – Inspector Dale
- Gift Horse (1952) – Jones
- The Gambler and the Lady (1952) – Dave Davies
- Girdle of Gold (1952) – Griffiths the Hearse
- The Great Game (1953) – Skid Evans
- The Cruel Sea (1953) – Yeoman Wells
- A Day to Remember (1953) – Bert Tripp
- Meet Mr. Malcolm (1954) – Whistler Grant
- Devil on Horseback (1954) – Ted Fellowes
- Final Appointment (1954) – Tom Martin
- To Dorothy a Son (1954) – Carter
- Mad About Men (1954) – Police Constable (uncredited)
- Mask of Dust (1954) – Laurence Gibson
- Burnt Evidence (1954) – Police Inspector Bob Edwards
- Lost (1956) – Sgt. Davies
- The Long Arm (1956) – Mr. Thomas
- Town on Trial (1957) – Sgt. Rogers
- Escapement (1958) – Dr. Phillip Maxwell
- Dunkirk (1958) – Dave Bellman
- Law and Disorder (1958) – Sergeant Bolton
- Tiger Bay (1959) – P.C. Williams
- The Trials of Oscar Wilde (1960) – Auctioneer
- Doctor in Love (1960) – Father
- Flame in the Streets (1961) – Harry Mitchell
- Only Two Can Play (1962) – Clergyman on the Committee
- Mix Me a Person (1962) – Johnson
- This Is My Street (1964) – Steve
- The Great St Trinian's Train Robbery (1966) – Chairman
- Gulliver's Travels (1977) – Uncle
