= Alexander Gauge =

British actor (1914–1960)

Alexander Ralph Gauge
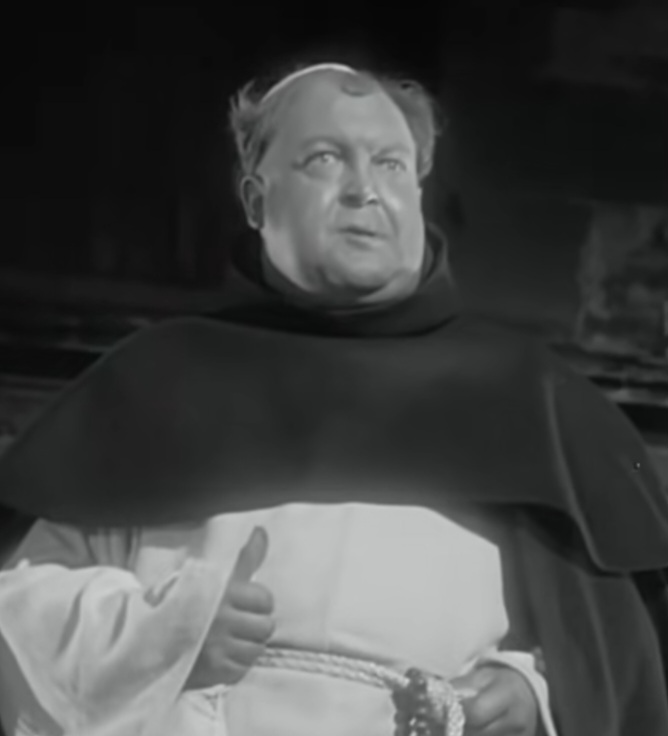
- Gauge as Tetzel in Martin Luther (1953)
- Born: 29 July 1914; Wenzhou, China
- Died: 28 August 1960 (aged 46); Woking, Surrey, UK
- Occupation: Actor
- Years active: 1945–1960

Alexander Gauge (29 July 1914 – 28 August 1960) was a British character actor best known for playing Friar Tuck in The Adventures of Robin Hood from 1955 to 1959.

== Biography ==
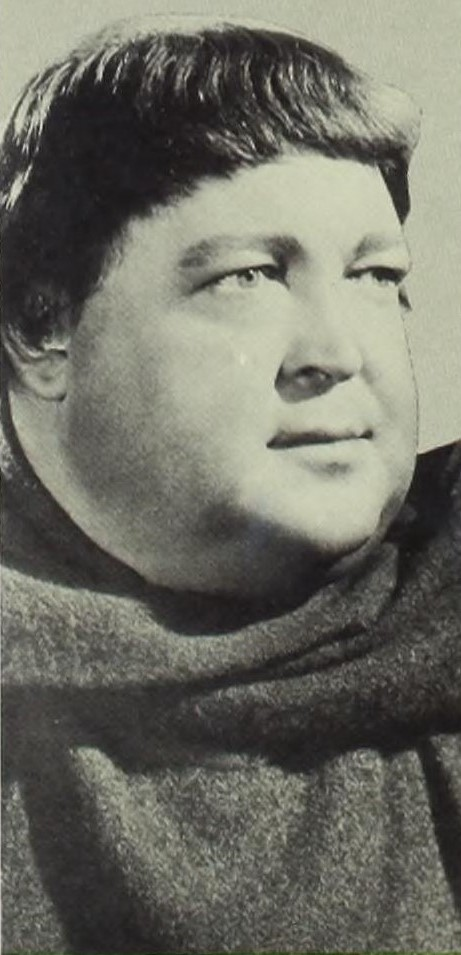
Gauge as Friar Tuck in The Adventures of Robin Hood, 1959

Gauge was born in a Methodist Mission station in Wenzhou, China. He attended school in California before moving to England. He served in the British Army in India during World War II, where he became acquainted with John Masters. He first appeared on the New York stage in 1945. He acted in many of Shakespeare's plays and usually played villains in British films, but many considered his forte to be comedy. He was a great hit in the London stage production of The Seven Year Itch.

Gauge appeared in the films The Interrupted Journey in 1949. In 1952, he appeared in Murder in the Cathedral, Mother Riley Meets the Vampire, with Old Mother Riley and Béla Lugosi, and The Pickwick Papers as the flirtatious Tracy Tupman. He also appeared in the Martin Luther (1953), Beau Brummell (1954), The Green Man (1956) and The Iron Petticoat (1956) starring Bob Hope. In 1955 he joined the cast of both The Scarlet Pimpernel (as George, the Prince Regent) and The Adventures of Robin Hood, as Friar Tuck, a role he played until 1960. In 1959, Gauge starred as Brigadier Wellington-Bull in the series The Adventures of Brigadier Wellington-Bull alongside Valerie Singleton.

In 1960, just weeks before his death, he played the Duke of Norfolk in the original West End production of A Man for All Seasons at the Globe Theatre. His last performance was a posthumous appearance in the 1961 film Nothing Barred starring Brian Rix.

Gauge married Phyllis Anne Young in Penzance in 1957. He died aged 46 in Woking in Surrey in 1960 from an overdose.

== Partial filmography ==
- The Interrupted Journey (1949) as Jerves Wilding (film debut)
- Flesh and Blood (1951) as Coutts
- Murder in the Cathedral (1951) as King Henry II
- Mother Riley Meets the Vampire (1952) as Police Constable (uncredited)
- Penny Princess (1952) as MacNabb the Lawyer (uncredited)
- The Pickwick Papers (1952) as Tracy Tupman
- The Great Game (1953 film) as Ben Woodhall
- Martin Luther (1953) as Tetzel
- The Square Ring (1953) as 2nd Wiseacre
- House of Blackmail (1953) as Markham
- Counterspy (1953) as Smith
- Will Any Gentleman...? (1953) as Mr. Billing
- The Blazing Caravan (1954) as Mr. Buxton (Scotland Yard (film series)
- Fast and Loose (1954) as Hankin
- Double Exposure (1954) as Denis Clayton
- Dance Little Lady (1954) as Joseph Miller
- The Golden Link (1954) as Arnold Debenham
- Beau Brummell (1954) as Newspaper Man (uncredited)
- Sherlock Holmes (1954, TV) as Jabez Wilson
- Tiger by the Tail (1954) as Fitzgerald
- Mystery on Bird Island (1954) as Bronson
- Before I Wake (1955) as Police Sergeant (U.S. title: Shadow of Fear).
- The Hornet's Nest (1955) as Mr. Arnold
- Reluctant Bride (1955) as Humbold
- No Smoking (1955) as Wellington-Simpson
- Handcuffs, London (1955) as Nicholas Bardwill
- The Adventures of the Scarlet Pimpernel (1955-1956) as The Prince Regent
- The Adventures of Robin Hood (1955-1959, TV) as Friar Tuck
- Port of Escape (1956) as Inspector Levins
- The Iron Petticoat (1956) as Senator Howley
- Breakaway (1956) as MacAllister
- The Green Man (1956) as Chairman
- The Passionate Stranger (1957) as Master of Ceremonies at Dance
- The Third Man (1959, TV) as Coffier
- Les canailles (1960) as Chalmers
- Nothing Barred (1961) as Traffic Policeman (final film)
