= Duncan Lamont =

British actor (1918–1978)

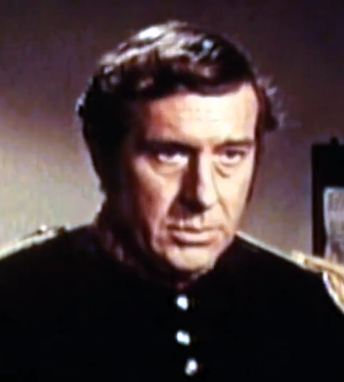
- Lamont in The Evil of Frankenstein (1964)
- Born: Duncan William Ferguson Lamont; 17 June 1918; Lisbon, Portugal
- Died: 19 December 1978 (aged 60); Royal Tunbridge Wells, Kent, England
- Occupation: Actor
- Years active: 1930s–1978
- Spouse: Patricia Driscoll (m. 1950)
- Children: 2

Duncan William Ferguson Lamont (17 June 1918 – 19 December 1978) was a British actor. Born in Lisbon, Portugal, and brought up in Scotland, he had a long and successful career in film and television, appearing in a variety of high-profile productions.

== Career ==
He trained as an actor at RADA in London, and had a considerable amount of stage experience before the Second World War. He acted in repertory, and at the Shakespeare Memorial Theatre, Stratford-upon-Avon. During the War he served as a sergeant pilot in the Glider Pilot Regiment of the British airborne forces. He resumed acting after the War, and entered films in the early 1950s.

On film, he appeared in The Man in the White Suit (1951, as Harry), The Adventures of Quentin Durward (1955, as the villain De La Marck), The 39 Steps (1959, as Kennedy), Ben-Hur (1959, as Marius, an associate of Messala), Mutiny on the Bounty (1962, as John Williams), Arabesque (1966, as Kyle Webster) and Battle of Britain (1969, as Flight Sergeant Arthur). Lamont is particularly memorable in his role as the wry, urbane Viceroy in Jean Renoir's The Golden Coach (1952).

From 1958 to 1960, Lamont was a semi-regular as David MacMorris in the CBS western television series, The Texan, starring Rory Calhoun.

Lamont also appeared in guest roles in a range of popular British programmes from the 1950s to the 1970s, including The Adventures of Robin Hood, Dixon of Dock Green, Danger Man, Department S, The Avengers, Callan, Secret Army, Randall and Hopkirk (Deceased), The Persuaders!, Robin's Nest and Doctor Who.

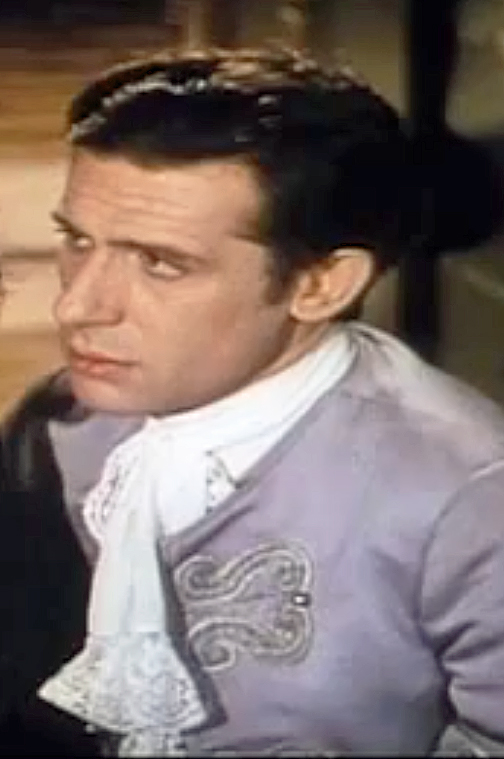
Lamont in the trailer for The Golden Coach (1952)

In 1953, he appeared in the major role of astronaut Victor Carroon in Nigel Kneale's ground-breaking BBC science-fiction serial The Quatermass Experiment, and fourteen years later returned to the series when he played the role of Sladden in the Hammer Films version of the third serial, Quatermass and the Pit.

He died in 1978 in Tunbridge Wells, Kent, of a heart attack at the age of 60. He was working at the time on "Hostage", an episode of the BBC science-fiction series Blake's 7. Although he had completed location work for the episode, he died before the studio scenes had been shot, necessitating a re-mount of the location material performed by his replacement John Abineri.

He was married to the Irish actress Patricia Driscoll until his death in 1978. They had two children together.

== Filmography ==
- Waterfront (1950) – 3rd Engineer On Ship (uncredited)
- The Woman in Question (1950) – Barney (uncredited)
- She Shall Have Murder (1950) – Police Sergeant
- The Galloping Major (1951) – 2nd Trainer
- There Is Another Sun (1951) – Policeman (uncredited)
- The Man in the White Suit (1951) – Harry
- Song of Paris (1952) – Undetermined Role (uncredited)
- Emergency Call (1952) – Police Constable
- The Lost Hours (1952) – Bristow
- The Night Won't Talk (1952) – Sergeant Robbins
- The Golden Coach (1952) – Ferdinand, Le Viceroy
- The Final Test (1953) – Unpleasant Pub Customer (uncredited)
- The Intruder (1953) – Donald Cope
- The End of the Road (1953) – Barney
- Meet Mr. Malcolm (1954) – Superintendent Simmons
- Time Is My Enemy (1954) – Inspector Charles Wayne
- The Teckman Mystery (1954) – Insp. Hilton
- The Passing Stranger (1954) – Fred
- Burnt Evidence (1954) – Jack Taylor
- Passage Home (1955) – 1st Mate Llewllyn
- Strike (1955, TV film)
- The Adventures of Quentin Durward (1955) – Count William De La Marck
- The Baby and the Battleship (1956) – Master-at-Arms
- High Flight (1957) – Weapons Corporal
- A Tale of Two Cities (1958) – Ernest Defarge
- I Was Monty's Double (1958) – Wing Cdr. Bates
- The 39 Steps (1959) – Kennedy
- Ben-Hur (1959) – Marius (uncredited)
- A Touch of Larceny (1959) – 1st Special Branch man Gregson
- Circle of Deception (1960) – Jules Burlard
- The Queen's Guards (1961) – Wilkes
- Sodom and Gomorrah (1962)
- Mutiny on the Bounty (1962) – John Williams
- Panic (1963) – Inspector Saunders
- Murder at the Gallop (1963) – Hillman
- The Scarlet Blade (1963) – Maj. Bell
- The Devil-Ship Pirates (1964) – The Bosun
- The Evil of Frankenstein (1964) – Chief of Police
- Coast of Skeletons (1964) – Charlie Singer (voice, uncredited)
- The Brigand of Kandahar (1965) – Colonel Drewe
- The Murder Game (1965) – Inspector Telford
- Arabesque (1966) – Webster
- The Witches (1966) – Bob Curd
- Frankenstein Created Woman (1967) – The Prisoner
- Quatermass and the Pit (1967) – Sladden
- The Strange Case of Dr. Jekyll and Mr. Hyde (1968, TV Movie) – Sergeant Grimes
- Decline and Fall... of a Birdwatcher (1968) – Inspector Bruce
- Battle of Britain (1969) – Flight Sgt. Arthur
- Burke & Hare (1971) – Dr. Saint
- Pope Joan (1972) – 1st Wounded Soldier
- Nothing But the Night (1973) – Dr. Knight
- The Creeping Flesh (1973) – Inspector
- Doctor Who (1974) – Death to the Daleks – Dan Galloway
- Poldark (1975) – Bartholomew Tregirls
- Escape from the Dark (1976)
- Robin's Nest (1976) – Mr MacGregor
