= Daniel Birt =

English film director and editor (1907–1955)

- Born: 23 June 1907; Mersham, Kent, England
- Died: 15 May 1955 (aged 47); London, England
- Occupations: Film director and editor
- Years active: 1932 – 1955

Daniel Birt (23 June 1907 – 15 May 1955) was an English film director and editor.

== Career ==
Birt began his career as an editor in 1932 with an assistant credit on The Lucky Number and went on to edit 12 films during the 1930s. World War II brought a career hiatus and Birt didn't return to the film industry until the late 1940s.

Having worked as supervising editor on Green Fingers and The Ghosts of Berkeley Square, he was given his first directorial assignment in 1947 - The Three Weird Sisters, a pseudo-Gothic tale set in a decaying Welsh mansion. This was followed in 1948 by No Room at the Inn (co-scripted, like the previous film, by Dylan Thomas), a powerful and unsparing film dealing with child cruelty in an evacuee household during the war.

Birt directed a further ten films in the crime/thriller genre, mostly second features, before his early death, aged 47, in May 1955. He also directed three episodes of the first series of the ITV television drama The Adventures of Robin Hood, which were broadcast posthumously in late 1955. Birt's final film, the Anglo-Danish co-production Laughing in the Sunshine, was also released after his death, entering UK general release on 2 January 1956.

== Selected filmography ==
=== Editor ===
- Channel Crossing (1933)
- Honeymoon for Three (1935)
- Variety (1935)
- The Invader (1935)
- Twice Branded (1936)
- Weddings Are Wonderful (1938)
- If I Were Boss (1938)
- Scruffy (1938)
- Old Mother Riley, MP (1939)
- Miracles Do Happen (1939)
- Music Hall Parade (1939)
- Woman to Woman (1947)

=== Director ===
- 1948: The Three Weird Sisters
- 1948: No Room at the Inn
- 1949: The Interrupted Journey
- 1950: She Shall Have Murder
- 1952: The Night Won't Talk
- 1952: Circumstantial Evidence
- 1953: Three Steps in the Dark
- 1953: Background
- 1954: Burnt Evidence
- 1954: Meet Mr. Malcolm
- 1954: Third Party Risk [and co-writer]
- 1956: Laughing in the Sunshine [and co-writer]

=== Producer ===
- The Girl Who Forgot (1940)
- Three Silent Men (1940)
