= Thea Gregory =

British actress (1926–2022)

- Born: Ida Reddish; 1926; Nottingham, England
- Died: 18 December 2022 (aged 96)
- Occupation: Actress
- Years active: 1945–1957
- Spouse: John Gregson (m. 1947; died 1975)
- Children: 6 (3 daughters, 3 sons)

Thea Gregory (née Ida Reddish; 1926 – 18 December 2022) was a British actress, known for her roles in numerous in B-movie thrillers, including The Golden Link and Profile.

== Early life ==
Thea Gregory was born in Nottingham in 1926 as Ida Reddish, daughter of Stephen Albert Reddish (1893 – 1988), a commercial traveller in the printing industry and Edith (née Lewis, born 1893). Reddish had a sister, Jennie (1923 – 1981), and grew up in West Bridgford, Nottinghamshire.

== Career ==
Gregory began her stage career, under the name Ida Reddish, with Birmingham repertory theatre, in the early 1940s. She appeared in plays such as King John, alongside Denis Quilley, and The Insect Play, with Paul Eddington.

Gregory also worked under the name Thea Kronberg. In 1945, she moved to Perth and joined a small repertory company, where she met fellow member John Gregson, who would become her husband. As Gregson's prominence grew, so did Gregory's by association, and they began working at Ealing Studios for the Rank Organisation. Now married, Gregory made her film debut in 1950, credited as Thea Gregory, in the Ealing comedy The Magnet.

After a short break to concentrate on her family, Gregory returned to the screen in 1954 in a supporting role in The Weak and the Wicked, alongside Gregson, Glynis Johns and Diana Dors. Later that year, Gregory took the lead role in the crime drama Solution by Phone, followed by The Scarlet Spear and Five Days. 1954 continued to be a busy year, as Gregory took the lead in The Golden Link. Patrick Gibbs, writing in The Daily Telegraph, described it as "an unpretentious, workmanlike whodunnit which will provide much pleasure for, I trust, little initial cost .... of the ladies, Thea Gregory and Marla Landi were worth the most detailed investigation."

Gregory, by now busy bringing up her growing family, appeared on television in episodes of The Vise and The Scarlet Pimpernel, as well as the films Stryker of the Yard and Satellite in the Sky.

== Personal life and death ==
In 1945, while in repertory theatre in Perth Theatre, Scotland, Gregory met John Gregson. The pair stayed in Scotland for eight months before moving to London. They were married in Hampstead, London, in 1947, before settling in Ealing and had three daughters (Catherine, Mary and Sarah Rose) and three sons (Nicholas, John and James). In 1958, they bought Creek House, an Arts & Crafts building, and former home to Bernard Braden and Barbara Kelly, in Shepperton, near to the film studios there.

Gregory was a devout Roman Catholic and took twice weekly communion. She built a small unconsecrated chapel in the ground across from the stream which gave the house its name, and continued to visit after moving away.

Gregson died of a heart attack, aged 55, while on holiday in Porlock Weir, Somerset in 1975. His body was interred at Sunbury Cemetery, Sunbury-on-Thames, Surrey near his family home at Creek House, Chertsey Road, Shepperton. He left £64,917 and died intestate. After the death of her husband, Gregory moved to Wotton Under Edge in the Cotswolds. She died on 18 December 2022, at the age of 96.

== Selected filmography ==
- Profile (1954)
- Solution by Phone (1954)
- The Golden Link (1954)
- Satellite in the Sky (1956)
- The Adventures of the Scarlet Pimpernel (ITV, 1955–1956)
