= Delano Ames =

American writer (1906–1987)

- Born: May 29, 1906; Mt. Vernon, Ohio
- Died: 1987 (aged 80–81); Madrid, Spain
- Occupation: Author
- Spouse(s): Maysie Coucher Ames (1929–1937); Kit Ames
- Relatives: Columbus Delano (grandfather)
- Writing career
- Genre: Crime fiction

Delano Ames (May 29, 1906 – January 1987) was an American writer of detective stories. Ames was the author of some 20 books, many of them featuring a husband and wife detective team of amateurs named Dagobert and Jane Brown. A later series of novels involved a character named Juan Lorca, of the Spanish Civil Guard, who solved local mysteries.

== Life ==
Ames was born in Mt. Vernon, Ohio, the son of Benjamin and Isabel Kirk Ames. Delano's father Benjamin worked for the local newspaper, but moved the family in 1917 to New Mexico. Ames' grandfather was Columbus Delano, Secretary of the Interior under President Ulysses S. Grant. Ames attended Yale and Columbia universities.

Ames married Australian-born writer Maysie Coucher Ames (1901–1971) in Greenwich Village, New York City, in 1929. Under the pen name Maysie Greig, she was a prolific author of light-hearted romance novels. They divorced on 17 April 1937.

Ames lived in England for the next few years, where he married his second wife, Kit, and was assigned as a British intelligence officer during World War II. He also worked on anthologies on mythology and as a translator for Larousse in France. His last book was an introduction for a book of photography of Spain in 1971.

He died in Madrid, Spain, in January 1987.

== Critical reception ==
Ames' books were reviewed frequently in prominent publications such as the New York Times and Kirkus Reviews, and were generally reviewed positively though not viewed as high art. The New York Times called 1949's She Shall Have Murder "amiable," comparing Dagobert Brown to Dorothy L. Sayers' detective Lord Peter Wimsey. Kirkus Reviews called his 1959 novel For Old Crime's Sake "fuzz-brained fluff for light entertainment."

== Works ==
=== Jane and Dagobert Brown series ===
- She Shall Have Murder. Hodder & Stoughton (1948); Reprinted Rue Morgue Press (2008). Filmed under the same title in 1950
- Murder Begins at Home. Hodder & Stoughton (1949)
- Corpse Diplomatique. Hodder (1950) & Subsequently, Penguin Books - his best known and most widely available book
- Death of a Fellow Traveller. Hodder & Stoughton (1950)
- The Body on Page One. Hodder & Stoughton (1951)
- Murder, Maestro, Please. Hodder & Stoughton (1952)
- No Mourning for the Matador. Hodder & Stoughton (1953)
- Crime, Gentlemen, Please. Hodder & Stoughton (1954)
- Landscape with Corpse. Hodder & Stoughton (1955)
- Crime Out of Mind. Hodder & Stoughton (1956)
- She Wouldn't Say Who. Hodder & Stoughton (1957)
- Lucky Jane. Hodder & Stoughton (1959); published in the US as For Old Crime's Sake

=== Juan Llorca series ===
- The Man in the Tricorn Hat. Methuen (1960)
- The Man with Three Jaguars. Methuen (1961)
- The Man with Three Chins. Methuen (1965)
- The Man with Three Passports. Methuen (1967)

=== Standalone titles ===
- They Journey by Night. Hodder & Stoughton (1932)
- No Traveller Returns. Nicholson (1934)
- A Double Bed on Olympus (1936)
- The Cornish Coast Conspiracy. Amalgamated Press (1942)
- He Found Himself Murdered. Swan (1947)

=== Non-fiction ===
- History of the Piano by Henry Closson, Translated by Delano Ames. Paul Elek 1947
