= Mary Germaine =

English film actress (born 1933)

- Born: 28 March 1933 (age 93); Westcliff-on-Sea, Essex, England, UK
- Occupation: Film actress
- Years active: 1951 - 1955

Mary Germaine (born 28 March 1933) is an English film actress.

== Filmography ==
| Year | Title | Role | Notes |
|---|---|---|---|
| 1951 | Laughter in Paradise | Susan Heath | |
| 1951 | Cloudburst | Peggy Reece | |
| 1952 | Where's Charley? | Kitty Verdun | |
| 1952 | Father's Doing Fine | Gerda her daughter | |
| 1952 | The Night Won't Talk | Hazel Carr | |
| 1952 | Women of Twilight | Veronica | |
| 1952 | The Floating Dutchman | Rose Reid | |
| 1953 | House of Blackmail | Carol Blane | |
| 1953 | Flannelfoot | Kathleen Fraser | |
| 1953 | Knights of the Round Table | Brigid | Uncredited |
| 1954 | The Green Carnation | Vivien Blake | |
| 1954 | Devil's Point | Margaret Lane | |
| 1955 | Out of the Clouds | BEA Receptionist | Uncredited, (final film role) |
