= She Shall Have Murder =

- British 1-sheet poster
- Directed by: Daniel Birt
- Written by: Allan MacKinnon
- Based on: She Shall Have Murder by Delano Ames
- Produced by: Guido Coen; Derrick De Marney
- Starring: Rosamund John; Derrick De Marney; Mary Jerrold
- Cinematography: Robert Navarro
- Edited by: Stefan Osiecki
- Music by: Eric Spear
- Production companies: Derrick De Marney Productions (as Concanen); British Lion Films (in association with)
- Distributed by: Independent Film Distributors
- Release date: 11 December 1950
- Running time: 90 minutes
- Country: United Kingdom
- Language: English

She Shall Have Murder is a 1950 British drama film directed by Daniel Birt and starring Rosamund John, Derrick De Marney and Felix Aylmer. It was written by Allan MacKinnon based on the 1949 novel of the same title by Delano Ames. The screenplay concerns a law office clerk who becomes a detective. It was co-financed by the Woolf brothers.

== Premise ==
A law office clerk who aspires to be a crime writer, turns into a detective when someone at her work is murdered.

== Cast ==
- Rosamund John as Jane Hamish
- Derrick De Marney as Dagobert Brown
- Mary Jerrold as Mrs. Robjohn
- Felix Aylmer as Mr. Playfair
- Joyce Heron as Rosemary Proctor
- Jack Allen as Major Stewart
- Henryetta Edwards as Sarah Swinburne
- Harry Fowler as Albert Oates
- John Bentley as Douglas Robjohn
- Beatrice Varley as Mrs. Hawthorne
- June Elvin as Barbara Jennings
- Jack McNaughton as bBarman
- Olaf Pooley as Mr. White
- Dennis Val Norton as pub landlord
- Francis de Wolff as Police Inspector
- Jonathan Field as darts player
- Jimmy Rhodes as racing man
- Tony Hilton as steward
- Frances Leak as shooting gallery attendant
- Wanda Rands as change girl
- Duncan Lamont as Police Sergeant

== Reception ==
The Monthly Film Bulletin wrote: "The tone of the film is one of determined and occasionally forced gaiety, which the action is too slow to sustain; the mystery, however, holds a certain amount of interest to the end, although none of the characters are sufficiently developed (particularly the murderer) for their motives to assume much plausibility."

Picture Show wrote: "Acting honours go to Harry Fowler for his smooth, humorously horrifying characterisation as an office boy with a flourishing 'spiv' sideline. Rosamund John and Derrick de Marney give most attractive portrayals and are excellently supported."

Picturegoer wrote: "Another British film which doesn't come off – despite some very gallant acting by its stars. The cause of the trouble is a jumbled script – it is shockingly naive at times – which contains too many miraculous coincidences."

In British Sound Films: The Studio Years 1928–1959 David Quinlan rated the film as "mediocre", writing: "Slow unconvincingly acted film has most of the faults typical of second-rate British thrillers of the time"
