= The Adventures of the Scarlet Pimpernel =

British TV drama series (1955–1956)

- Genre: Swashbuckler
- Based on: The Scarlet Pimpernel by Baroness Orczy
- Written by: Ralph Gilbert Bettison
- Directed by: David MacDonald; Dennis Vance; Michael McCarthy; Wolf Rilla
- Starring: Marius Goring
- Composers: Sydney Torch; John Bath; Edwin Astley
- Country of origin: United Kingdom
- Original language: English
- No. of series: 1
- No. of episodes: 18

Production
- Executive producer: Harry Alan Towers
- Producers: Anthony Gilkison; Dennis Vance; David MacDonald; Marius Goring
- Cinematography: Lionel Banes
- Editors: Seymour Logie; Ann Chegwidden
- Running time: 23-26 mins
- Production company: Towers of London

Original release
- Network: ITV
- Release: 28 September 1955 – 22 June 1956

The Adventures of the Scarlet Pimpernel is a 1955–1956 British television series based on the 1905 novel The Scarlet Pimpernel by Baroness Emmuska Orczy. The series was created by writer Michael Hogan and produced by the Towers of London for Incorporated Television Programmes. It was first screened in Britain in an eighteen-episode run beginning on 28 September 1955. It was one of the first drama series shown on the fledging network, which had only begun transmission in London the week before.

== Cast and characters ==
- Marius Goring as Sir Percy Blakeney/The Scarlet Pimpernel
- Stanley Van Beers as Chauvelin
- Patrick Troughton as Sir Andrew Ffoulkes
- Anthony Newlands as Lord Richard Hastings
- Alexander Gauge as George, Prince of Wales
- Lucie Mannheim as Countess la Valliere

== Production notes ==
- Lucie Mannheim was married to Marius Goring
- Filming was at Elstree Studios, London
- The series' sets were designed by the art director Duncan Sutherland.
- Marius Goring previously played the role of Sir Percy in a radio show which lasted from 1952 to 1953 in a total of 50 episodes. The series is now available to listen to for free on the Internet Archive.
- It was originally planned to produce 39 episodes but only 18 were eventually filmed and broadcast.

== Guest stars ==
Many guest stars appeared in other ITC series, BBC series and films:

- Ivor Dean
- Roger Delgado
- William Franklyn
- Conrad Phillips
- Robert Shaw
- Peter O'Toole
- Rachel Gurney
- Thea Gregory
- Maureen Connell
- Walter Rilla
- Phil Brown
- Brian Wilde

== Episodes ==
Dates are for the first broadcast on Independent Television in London (Associated-Rediffusion), Midlands and Northern.

No.	Title	Directed by	Written by	Original release date
1	"The Hostage"	Michael McCarthy	Ralph Gilbert Bettinson	28 September 1955
The Scarlet Pimpernel rescues a Baroness from Chauvelin, but she is reluctant to leave because Chauvelin is holding her son as a hostage. The Scarlet Pimpernel must rescue the boy and not give away his identity as Sir Percy Blakeney. Guest stars Yvonne Furneaux and Robert Shaw.
2	"Sir Percy's Wager"	Dennis Vance	Joel Murcott & R.G. Bettinson	5 October 1955
Outwardly foppish and simple and always ready to make a wager Sir Percy bets with Countess la Valliere, Chauvelin's agent at court, that the Pimpernel can rescue Lady Caroline Wells and almost loses his freedom. Guest stars Cyril Shaps.
3	"The Princess"	David MacDonald	Ralph Gilbert Bettinson	12 October 1955
The Pimpernel rescues the Marquise de Manton and returns to Paris disguised as Pierre, a peasant, to rescue her maid, Ginette, and in making their escape from prison Sir Percy imagines what might have been if he was not an aristocrat. Guest stars Susan Lyall Grant and Michael Collins.
4	"A Tale of Two Pigtails"	David MacDonald	Angus MacPhail & Diane Morgan	19 October 1955
Princess Melanie de Monsantes is rescued by the Pimpernel and Chauvelin goes to the court of the Prince Regent determined to find The Pimpernel but reckons without the Pimpernel's ability to disguise himself as a visiting Chinese designer who has been hired by the Prince of Wales. Kissing Melanie's hand would be remembered in the episode "Something Remembered". Guest stars Maureen Connell, Dennis Edwards and early appearance by Peter O'Toole
5	"The Lady in Distress"	Dennis Vance	Ralph Gilbert Bettinson	26 October 1955
The Pimpernel plans to free a woman from the guillotine but it is a trap by Chauvelin and Cecille, who holds the Pimpernel responsible for her brother's death. In the rescue, the Pimpernel is shot and wounded by a sword in his left arm. Guest stars Cyril Shaps, Alfie Bass and Ingeborg Wells
6	"Something Remembered"	David MacDonald	Joel Murcott & R.G. Bettinson	2 November 1955
Sir Percy, with his wounded left arm in a sling, is asked by Princess Melanie de Monsantes, whom the Pimpernel once rescued, to aid her brother, Jacques Fleury. The aid wanted is weapons to fight Chauvelin, but the Pimpernel remembers wars fought between Britain and France and only agrees to destroy the weapons. Guest stars William Franklyn, Maureen Connell and Robert Cawdron.
7	"The Elusive Chauvelin"	Dennis Vance	Ralph Gilbert Bettinson	9 November 1955
Chauvelin comes to England with a plan to capture the Pimpernel but takes the wrong man. Sir Percy must travel to France to rescue the young man but can only accomplish it disguised as Chauvelin. Guest stars Thea Gregory. Uncredited speaking part as, Louis, the chief executioner by Christopher Lee
8	"The Sword of Justice"	Dennis Vance	Ralph Gilbert Bettinson	16 November 1955
An Englishman murdering French aristocrats is impersonating the Pimpernel. Sir Percy engineers a plan that allows his capture and execution by Chauvelin. Guest stars Brian Wilde and Thea Gregory
9	"Thanksgiving Day"	David MacDonald	Michael Hogan	22 November 1955
An American woman is arrested as the Pimpernel and her brother, Frank Rawlinson, sanctioned by John Adams, needs the Pimpernel's help to rescue her, as he had recently been wounded in a duel with Sir Percy. Guest stars Phil Brown, William Abney, Arnold Diamond and Dennis Edwards
10	"Sir Andrew's Fate"	Wolf Rilla	Ralph Gilbert Bettinson	6 December 1955
While smuggling aristocrats out of France Andrew and Richard are pursued by Chauvelin's agents. Andrew is shot and wounded forcing Richard to leave him behind. Sir Percy returns to France to find Andrew and the only clue to his whereabouts is a girl Collette and her friend Madame Tussaud. Guest stars Balbina, Susan Richmond, and Ivor Dean
11	"The Ambassador's Lady"	David MacDonald	Joel Murcott & R.G. Bettinson	13 December 1955
Chauvelin, to Sir Percy's amazement, appoints Jacques Fleury as French ambassador and Richard's eye for Fleury's wife becomes the talk of the court. Fleury's wife is complicit in Chauvelin's plan to kill Jacques Fleury and blame Richard so France can declare war on Britain. Guests stars William Franklyn, Simone Lovell and Robert Cawdron.
12	"The Christmas Present"	David MacDonald	Ralph Gilbert Bettinson	20 December 1955
Mrs. Burton, Sir Percy's housekeeper, laments Christmases past when many children lived in the house. She is upset when Sir Percy leaves her alone to go to France to rescue four aristocrats that, to his astonishment, are small children. In his effort to save them he collects a donkey and a dog, despite pursuit by Chauvelin's soldiers, and brings them home, much to Mrs Burton's pleasure.
13	"The Flower Woman"	David MacDonald	Marius Goring	27 December 1955
The Comtesse la Valliere, a spy of Chauvelin, has known for sometime Percy is the Scarlet Pimpernel and when she hears one of her friends, an imprisoned leader of the revolution, is to be executed by the Committee of Public Safety, she enlists his help. He, dressed as a blind man and she as a flower woman, try to save the prisoners in an event known as the September Massacres but only 30 are saved and they find that her friend has already been executed. Guest stars Peter Halliday and Michael Collins.
14	"The Imaginary Invalids"	David MacDonald	John Moore	10 January 1956
Sir Percy discovers that Chauvelin is blackmailing the banker Rothstein by holding his daughter captive. Rothstein is ill with worry, Chauvelin is ill with gout, Rothstein's daughter is also ill. Sir Percy disguised as Chauvelin's doctor effects her rescue. Guest stars John Laurie
15	"Antoine & Antoinette"	David MacDonald	Angus MacPhail & Diane Morgan	24 January 1956
Antoine and Antoinette are waiting to be married when Chauvelin arrives and arrests them. Elise, the younger sister of Antoinette, who has a crush on the Pimpernel, escapes to try to reach England when she meets Sir Percy and his two associates, Sir Andrew and Lord Richard on the road. Sir Percy, disguised as the local judge, rescues them and brings all three to England narrowly escaping capture by Chauvelin.
16	"The Winged Madonna"	Wolf Rilla	Joel Murcott & R.G. Bettinson	7 February 1956
The Winged Madonna is an icon from one of France's dissolved monasteries. A girl trying to sell the icon to raise money for the monks and nuns draws Sir Percy and Hastings into devising not one but two plans of rescue when the Father Guardian refuses to leave so he can attend a pregnant woman. Disguised as an undertaker the Pimpernel visits Chauvelin to arrange a funeral. Guests stars Walter Rilla
17	"Gentlemen of the Road"	David MacDonald	Ralph Gilbert Bettinson	15 June 1956
When a beautiful woman shows an unusual interest in the Prince of Wales's affairs, Sir Percy uncovers a plot to assassinate the Hanoverian Prince George using highwaymen, and restore a Stuart King to the throne of Great Britain. The Scarlet Pimpernel becomes a gentleman of the road to thwart the plan. Guest stars Conrad Phillips and Celia Hewitt.
18	"The Farmer's Boy"	David MacDonald	John Moore	22 June 1956
The Pimpernel rescues Andre, one of his agents from Chauvelin, but has to find Jeanette, the man's daughter, before Chauvelin does. Disguised as a farm worker, he seeks a job at a farm owned by the girl's miserly uncle and meets a 'boy' working at the farm — the disguised Jeanette. Guests stars Elvi Hale, Roger Delgado, Ivor Dean, and Michael Ripper

== Home media ==
Alpha Home Entertainment released Volume 1 of The Adventures of the Scarlet Pimpernel on DVD in 2006. Volume 2 was released in 2007. Each volume contains four episodes from the television series. The cover art used on these releases, however, erroneously used photos of Marius Goring in his character as Conductor 71 from his 1946 film A Matter of Life and Death.

Network (UK) released the entire 18-episode series on a three disc DVD set on 30 July 2012 with some extras included: a behind the scenes photo gallery.
