= Girls Will Be Boys =

- Directed by: Marcel Varnel
- Written by: Curt Siodmak; Roger Burford; Clifford Grey
- Produced by: Walter C. Mycroft
- Starring: Dolly Haas; Cyril Maude; Esmond Knight
- Cinematography: Claude Friese-Greene; Ronald Neame
- Edited by: Bert Bates
- Production company: British International Pictures
- Distributed by: Wardour Films
- Release date: 17 September 1934
- Running time: 70 minutes
- Country: United Kingdom
- Language: English

Girls Will Be Boys is a 1934 British comedy film by French director Marcel Varnel and starring Dolly Haas, Cyril Maude and Esmond Knight. It was written by Roger Burford and Clifford Grey based on the play The Last Lord by Curt Siodmak. The film was shot at Elstree Studios with sets designed by the art director Cedric Dawe.

== Plot ==
A young woman dresses up as a boy to fool a wealthy misogynist.

== Cast ==
- Dolly Haas as Pat Caverley
- Cyril Maude as Duke of Bridgwater
- Esmond Knight as Geoffrey Dawson
- Irene Vanbrugh as Princess of Ehrenstein
- Edward Chapman as Grey
- Ronald Ward as Bernard
- Charles Paton as Sanders
- H. F. Maltby as General
- Robert Rietty as boy

== Reception ==
Kine Weekly wrote: "Here is a pert, jolly comedy, cunningly devised to delight types of picturegoers. The piquant theme, evergreen in its humour and appeal, is approached from an entirely new angle and is productive of a bright succession of hilarious situations, gaily relieved by pretty sentiment. Dolly Haas, star of a number of Continental successes, by her captivating performance in the leading role, which calis for male impersonation, should firmly establish herself here, while Cyril Maude and Edward Chapman contribute excellent support. The direction is neat and resourceful, the gags follow through effectively, and the production work is first-class."

The Daily Film Renter wrote: "Packed out with piquant incident relevant to heroine's disguise; flavoured with appropriate romantic values, and embellished with tuneful song number, film has been neatly directed. Star gives excellent portrayal, capitally supported by! Cyril Maude and Edward Chapman. Sound, popular entertainment on 'different' lines."
