= Roger Burford =

English poet, novelist and screenwriter (1904–1981)

- Born: 31 January 1904; Kirby Muxloe, Leicestershire, England
- Died: 27 January 1981 (aged 76); Isle of Wight, Hampshire, England
- Other name: Roger East
- Occupation: Screenwriter
- Years active: 1928–1965

Roger d'Este Burford (31 January 1904 – 27 January 1981) was an English poet, novelist and screenwriter. He also wrote crime fiction as Roger East.

== Early life and education ==
He was the son of Samuel Francis Burford (b. 1857, Desborough – d. 1935 Watford) an analytical chemist, and Clara d'Este Burford (née d'Este Emery, b. 1865, Market Harborough – d. 1935, Leicester). He had an elder brother, Francis Emery Buford (1898-1918), who was killed in action whilst a 2nd Lt. in the 1st. Battalion, Leicestershire Regiment, and sister Marjorie Clara Burford (b. 1899).

Burford attended Gonville and Caius College, Cambridge, going up in autumn 1922 and taking the English Tripos. In Easter Term 1923 he was a founder member of the Cambridge University Kinema Club (CUKC). During the 1923 vacation the club visited Gaumont Studios in Shepherd's Bush, London, and in the Michaelmas Term of that year it went to Famous Players–Lasky Studio in Islington, London, where George Pearson was shooting Reveille. Pearson later gave a talk to the CUKC in Lent Term, 1924. Pearson's comedies would be a particular enthusiasm of Burford's in his early writing on film. In Michaelmas term 1923 Burford became friends with fellow CUKC member Christopher Isherwood. He is fictionalised as "Roger East" in Isherwood's novel Lions and Shadows. After graduating, Burford registered for two terms at Leicester School of Art, having some talent as a painter. In the spring of 1926 he briefly taught Greek at Wooton Court Preparatory School. He then moved to London, sharing rooms in a boarding house on Redcliffe Road, Chelsea, with the painter Stella Wilkinson (1903-1944), whom he had met at Leicester School of Art. Stella appears as "Polly" in Lions and Shadows. The couple left London for a trip to Milan in September 1926, letting Isherwood take over their rooms. On 28 April 1927 Burford married Stella in a London registry office, with Isherwood one of the two witnesses. The two men corresponded throughout the 1930s and Burford's letters are preserved in Isherwood's papers in the Huntington Library.

Stella died in 1944, whilst the couple were living near Wincanton, Somerset. In 1949 he married Stella Jonckheere (b. ____), Roubaix) who was the literary editor at Ealing Studios, and later at Group 3.

== Writing career ==
He published the well-received "realist" novel Kay Walters, A Woman of the People in 1928. He remained active in British literary circles, publishing his poetry regularly in "little magazines" such as Seed and Booster and becoming a member of the editorial board of the poetry magazine Delta in April 1938. A collection of his verse was published in 1947.

In the late 1920s he also began a career as a writer of screen scenarios and scripts in the British film industry, being first of all employed as a scenario reader for Walter Mycroft at BIP in 1928. He would then become a scenario editor at British Instructional, before returning to BIP as a writer in 1932. He expanded into television in the 1950s, writing the BBC drama Three Steps in the Dark (1953). His abilities as both a crime novelist and screenwriter led to him specialising in TV crime drama for much of the 1960s. He was the principal scriptwriter for the BBC series Maigret (1960–64) and also wrote for the one-off series The Hidden Truth and The Sentimental Agent. He also wrote a single episode for the BBC series Dr. Finlay's Casebook in 1965.

Burford was a diplomat in Moscow during World War II.

== Publications ==
As Roger d'Este Burford:

- Kay Walters, A Woman of the People (London: Jonathan Cape, 1928)

As Roger Burford:

- Poems and Documents (Reading: White & White 1937)
- Appointment with Seven (London: Fortune Press, 1947)(contribution)
- Moscow Blues. A Romance (London: Constable, 1974)

As Roger East:

- The Mystery of the Monkey Gland Cocktail (New York: Putnam, 1932)
- Murder Rehearsal (London: Collins, 1933)
- A Candidate for Lilies (London: Collins, 1934)
- The Bell is Answered (London: Collins, 1934)
- Twenty Five Sanitary Inspectors (London: Collins, 1935)
- Detectives in Gum Boots (London: Collins, 1936)
- Meet Mr. Malcolm
- The Pearl Choker (London: Collins, 1954)
- Kingston Black (London: Collins, 1960)
- The Pin Men (London: Hodder & Stoughton, 1963)

As "Simon" in collaboration with Oswell Blakeston:

- Death on the Swim
- Murder Among Friends (1933)
- The Cat with the Moustache (1935)

== Selected Scripts and Scenarios ==
- Cocktails (1928)
- Piccadilly Nights (1930)
- Red Wagon (1933)
- Freedom of the Seas (1934)
- Blossom Time (1934)
- Girls Will Be Boys (1934)
- Abdul the Damned (1934)
- Dance Band (1935)
- I Give My Heart (1935)
- Invitation to the Waltz (1935)
- No Monkey Business (1935)
- Love in Exile (1936)
- Public Nuisance No. 1 (1936)
- Pagliacci (1936)
- Doctor Syn (1937)
- Bank Holiday (1938)
- Once a Crook (1941)
- Molly and Me (1945)
- The Night Won't Talk (1952)
- Maigret "The Burglar's Wife" (1960) Translated into Dutch for the Maigret series on Dutch TV, 1965.
- Maigret "The Revolver" (1960)
- Maigret "The Mistake" (1960)
- Maigret "The Cactus" (1961)
- Maigret "The Simple Case" (1961)
- Maigret "Raise Your Right Hand" (1961)
- Maigret "The White Hat" (1962)
- Maigret "The Madman of Vervac" (1962)
- Maigret "The Countess" (1962)
- Maigret "High Politics" (1962)
- Maigret "The Crystal Ball" (1962)
- Maigret "A Man Condemned" (1963)
- Dr. Finlay's Casebook "In Committee" (1965)

== Film Adaptations ==
Meet Mr. Malcolm (Dan Birt, 1954)

== Bibliography ==
- Low, Rachael. History of the British Film: Filmmaking in 1930s Britain. George Allen & Unwin, 1985 .
