= Wolfgang Wilhelm (writer) =

German screenwriter (1906–1984)

- Born: 28 November 1906; Stettin; German Empire
- Died: January 1984 (aged 77); Shepway, Kent; United Kingdom
- Occupation: Screenwriter
- Years active: 1930 - 1956

Wolfgang Wilhelm (1906–1984) was a German-born screenwriter who later settled in Britain. He worked in the German film industry before leaving after the Nazi taking of power in 1933. He worked for a number of Britain's leading film producers.

== Filmography ==
- Susanne Cleans Up (1930)
- I'll Stay with You (1931)
- A Woman Branded (1931)
- Spell of the Looking Glass (1932)
- There Goes the Bride (1932)
- No Day Without You (1933)
- Today Is the Day (1933)
- Give Her a Ring (1934)
- The Luck of a Sailor (1934)
- Brewster's Millions (1935)
- Farewell Again (1937)
- Yoshiwara (1937)
- The Silent Battle (1939)
- This Man Reuter (1940)
- Freedom Radio (1941)
- 'Pimpernel' Smith (1941)
- Uncensored (1942)
- The Saint Meets the Tiger (1943)
- Escape to Danger (1943)
- Squadron Leader X (1943)
- Great Day (1945)
- I See a Dark Stranger (1946)
- Captain Boycott (1947)
- The End of the River (1947)
- A Kingdom for a House (1949)
- The Secret People (1952)
- The Great Game (1953)
- Don't Blame the Stork (1953)
- Holiday in Tyrol (1956)

== Bibliography ==
- Bergfelder, Tim & Cargnelli, Christian. Destination London: German-speaking emigrés and British cinema, 1925-1950. Berghahn Books, 2008.
