= Satellite in the Sky =

1956 British film by Paul Dickson

- US theatrical release insert poster
- Directed by: Paul Dickson
- Written by: John Mather; J.T. McIntosh; Edith Dell
- Produced by: Edward J. Danziger; Harry Lee Danziger
- Starring: Kieron Moore; Lois Maxwell; Donald Wolfit; Bryan Forbes
- Cinematography: Georges Périnal; James Wilson
- Edited by: Sidney Stone
- Music by: Albert Elms
- Production companies: Danziger Productions Ltd. New Elstree Studios
- Distributed by: Warner Bros. Pictures
- Release date: 21 July 1956
- Running time: 84 minutes
- Country: United Kingdom
- Language: English

Satellite in the Sky is a 1956 British CinemaScope science fiction film in Warner Color, produced by Edward J. Danziger and Harry Lee Danziger, directed by Paul Dickson, and starring Kieron Moore, Lois Maxwell, Donald Wolfit, and Bryan Forbes. It was distributed by Warner Bros. Pictures. Special effects were by Wally Veevers, who would later work on most influential sci-fi masterpiece, Stanley Kubrick's 2001: A Space Odyssey (1968). (Note: Walter Joseph "Wally" Veevers had a long career in special effects that began with Things to Come (1936) and ended with The Keep (1983).) (Note: Lois Maxwell would later gain fame playing Miss Moneypenny in the James Bond series of films.)

== Plot ==
After initial experiments using high-speed aircraft are finally successful, scientists in Great Britain plan to launch the Stardust, the first crewed spaceship to venture into outer space. Some of the crew members have concerned loved ones. Barbara, the wife of Larry Noble, and Ellen, the girlfriend of radio operator Jimmy Wheeler, are afraid that the space flight will be dangerous.

Although the crew, headed by Commander Michael Haydon, initially believe they are on a scientific mission, the "meteorologist" on board, Professor Merrity, is revealed to be actually working for the United States to test an experimental nuclear "tritonium" bomb. The object is to use the super-powerful explosion to persuade nations to abandon nuclear weapons.

Complications arise when a crew member discovers a stowaway. Troublesome reporter Kim Hamilton, who has been very vocal about the worth of the mission and of space exploration in general, had impulsively stowed away the night before to get a first-hand experience of the flight and its crew.

The tritonium bomb is released from the ship into space, but when its propulsion unit fails and the bomb magnetically attaches itself to the hull of the spaceship, everyone's lives are threatened. The crew and their surprise guest race against time to defuse or escape the bomb.

== Cast ==
- Kieron Moore as Commander Michael Haydon
- Lois Maxwell as Kim Hamilton
- Donald Wolfit as Professor Merrity
- Bryan Forbes as Jimmy Wheeler
- Jimmy Hanley as Larry Noble
- Barry Keegan as "Lefty" Blake
- Donald Gray as Captain Ross
- Thea Gregory as Barbara Noble
- Shirley Lawrence as Ellen
- Alan Gifford as Colonel Galloway
- Walter Hudd as Professor Blandford
- Carl Jaffe as Professor Bechstein
- Peter Neil as Tony
- Ryck Rydon as reporter (credited as Rick Rydon)
- Ronan O'Casey as reporter
- Robert O'Neil as reporter

== Production ==
Satellite in the Sky was the first British science fiction film to be shot in CinemaScope and WarnerColor. Footage of the Avro Vulcan (Note: The second Avro Vulcan B.1, XA890 appeared in the film.) and the Folland Midge, the prototype for the later Folland Gnat aircraft series, was featured in the beginning of the film, as scientists push the envelope of high-speed flight and test exotic rocket fuels. The Midge portrays a fictional jet fighter used to test an experimental fuel. Wally Veevers' extensive model work with miniatures and matte paintings is notable. The model rocket looks futuristic, though a familiar period design, using a long, angled ramp (à la When Worlds Collide) to launch the rocket into space.

== Critical reception ==
The Monthly Film Bulletin wrote: "Despite good model work and attempts at space spectacle, Satellite in the Sky remains, for the most part, disappointingly trite and unconvincing. The rocket ship's crew, including a large percentage of "problem" characters, is augmented by the unlikely presence of a lady reporter, who spends most of the time asking foolish questions. Faced with such an unpromising story, Paul Dickson has been unable to work up much interest in its outcome."

Bosley Crowther of The New York Times described the weakness in the plot: "the trouble with this film is that it makes space travel so simple that it is without surprise or kick."

Film critic Leonard Maltin called Satellite in the Sky "elaborate but unexciting."

The Radio Times Guide to Films gave the film 2/5 stars, calling the film a: "full-throttled, but hopelessly inadequate space opera", adding "Lois Maxwell displays none of Miss Moneypenny's sang-froid as a stowed-away pacifist reporter. But no one stands a chance of making much impression alongside Donald Wolfit's risibly bombastic inventor."

In British Sound Films: The Studio Years 1928–1959 David Quinlan rated the film as "mediocre", writing: "Laughable space-age heroics."

The review in Video Movie Guide 2002 called it a "Tedious sci-fi adventure memorable for a fun performance by Donald Wolfit as the bomb's eccentric inventor."
