= Bernard Robinson (production designer) =

British film designer (1912–1970)

Bernard Robinson (born 1912 in Liverpool, England, died 1970) designed sets for several of Hammer's films in their heyday, including The Curse of Frankenstein (1957), Abominable Snowman of the Himalayas (1957), Dracula (1958), Curse of the Werewolf (1961), The Phantom of the Opera (1962), The Gorgon (1964) and Quatermass and the Pit (1968). He was known for giving the Hammer films a lavish, expensive look while working on a restricted budget. The association ended with his premature death in 1970.

== Career ==
Bernard Robinson designed some of Hammer's greatest productions. His widow, the puppeteer Margaret Robinson, also worked on many Hammer films. The knack that Bernard possessed was that he managed to give Hammer's films a very expensive look working from a tiny budget. Both space and materials were extremely limited at Bray Studios. Robinson got over this by ingeniously disguising previously used sets for different films, sometimes even for different scenes within the same film. Many films set he designed such as the hallways of the castle in Horror of Dracula (1958, pictured), for instance, doubled as the Holmwood crypt, and Dracula's crypt from the same year was recycled as Frankenstein's laboratory in Revenge of Frankenstein.

Perhaps his biggest challenge was the 1962 Phantom of the Opera, which required a huge water-tank to be constructed for the Phantom's underground lair.

His sets on the Bray back lot were mammoth works of construction that would usually be employed for two or three films before being replaced. Among his best were the 1958 Castle Dracula/Baskerville Hall for Horror of Dracula and The Hound of the Baskervilles, respectively, the Gothic castle doubling for Dracula, Prince of Darkness and Rasputin, the Mad Monk in 1965, and perhaps supremely, the 19th-century Cornish village that provided the setting for The Plague of the Zombies and The Reptile in 1966. In Bernard's spare time, which was very limited, he wrote about antique furniture and was preparing a book on the subject before his untimely death. Another passion was paintings- but painting for himself and his particular sense of humour. In his painting the Tax Inspectors we see Bernard's humour bounce through with a crazed inspection in of tax officials going over a corpse with magnifying glass and probe. The style of Bernard Robinson's paintings could be associated with the great cubists or abstract painters of the period such as Picasso and Braque; his handling of paint bear him out as a phenomenal painter who knew his craft and, like Picasso's heavy narrative, he informs by subtle messages conveyed with a rigour of style and oil to canvas that its hard not to be impressed and informed at once. These paintings form part of a private collection of oils that will be shown later this year (2021).

Bernard Robinson was survived by his widow, the artist and Hammer film mask maker Margaret Robinson, until her death in 2016 at the age of 96.

== Selected filmography ==
- Paper Orchid (1949)
- Double Confession (1950)
- The Night Won't Talk (1952)
- The Good Die Young (1954)
