= Wide Boy (film) =

1952 British film by Ken Hughes

- Theatrical release poster
- Directed by: Ken Hughes
- Written by: William Fairchild (uncredited)
- Based on: an original story by Rex Rienits
- Produced by: William H. Williams executive Nat Cohen; Stuart Levy
- Starring: Susan Shaw; Sydney Tafler; Ronald Howard
- Cinematography: Josef Ambor
- Edited by: Geoffrey Muller
- Music by: Eric Spear
- Production company: Merton Park Studios
- Distributed by: Anglo-Amalgamated (UK)
- Release date: April 1952
- Running time: 67 minutes
- Country: United Kingdom
- Language: English
- Budget: £7,000

Wide Boy is a 1952 British second feature ('B') crime film directed by Ken Hughes and starring Susan Shaw, Sydney Tafler and Ronald Howard.

It was Hughes' feature directorial debut. He later called it "pretty terrible".

== Plot ==
Benny is a black marketeer, dealing in stolen goods; after yet another arrest Benny meets up with his girlfriend Molly, a hairdresser, and they go somewhere different for them, a bar called The Flamingo.

There are only two other customers there at the bar, Robert Mannering and his mistress Caroline Blaine, and it is clear from their conversation that he is a famous surgeon whose wife is dying. Benny notices Caroline's smart handbag, and manages to steal Caroline's wallet. Benny then realises that he recognises Mannering as a famous surgeon. Mannering and Caroline leave shortly afterwards, followed by Benny and Molly, who is unaware of Benny's theft, but Mannering and Caroline return to the bar as they realise that the wallet was stolen by Benny, although the barman George says he did not know Benny as he had never been to the bar before.

Back in his room Benny finds £32 in the wallet, but also a letter from Mannering to Caroline, which makes it clear that he is having an affair with her and that his wife must not find out. He decides to blackmail the couple, and Mannering agrees to pay him as he does not want any scandal as he is trying to get voted onto the Council of the Royal College of Surgeons.

Mannering agrees to meet Benny and pay £200 for the letter, but finds that he has been cheated and does not get the letter back. Benny spends some of the money on a watch for Molly, which he says cost him £60. He then rings up Mannering again, this time asking for £300, but as he goes to the meeting he buys a gun. When he meets Mannering they swap the money and the letter, but Benny tells Mannering, falsely, that he took a photo of the letter and has the negative, suggesting that he intends to continue blackmailing Mannering. The latter grabs hold of Benny, but in the ensuing struggle Benny shoots Mannering dead.

The police investigation soon leads them first to Caroline, and then George, the barman at the Flamingo, who identifies Benny from police files. They go to Benny's address but he manages to escape and goes to a crook, Rocco, to try and get out of the country. Rocco however wants £400, so Benny decides to ask Molly to give him back the watch so that he can raise the money. By chance however Caroline makes an appointment at the hairdressers where Molly works, and inadvertently Molly makes Caroline realise that it was she with Benny in the Flamingo that evening; she then hears a conversation between Molly and Benny on the phone, arranging a meeting at a railway bridge that evening. She tells the police, who are waiting for Benny when he turns up; he tries to escape by scrambling over the bridge but falls to his death on the tracks below.

== Cast ==
- Sydney Tafler as Benny
- Susan Shaw as Molly
- Melissa Stribling as Caroline Blaine
- Colin Tapley as Robert Mannering
- Ronald Howard as Chief Inspector Carson
- Gerald Case as Detective Sgt Stott
- Laidman Browne as Pop
- Glyn Houston as George
- Martin Benson as Rocco
- Dorothy Bramhall as Felicity
- Madeline Burgess as Sally
- Ian Wallace as Mario
- Peggy Banks as receptionist (uncredited)

== Production ==
The story was by Rex Rienits, who also used it for a radio play (see below) and short story. Rienits wrote the scenario for star Sydney Tafler, who had been in the 1951 film Assassin for Hire (1951), also written by Rienits. Tafler, however, played a different role in Wide Boy, whereas Ronald Howard and Gerald Case were cast as the same policeman characters they'd played in the earlier film.

Film rights for the story were bought by Anglo Amalgamated and filming started at the end of January 1952.

== Reception ==
Wide Boy was released in June 1952 as support feature to the Anthony Kimmins film Who Goes There!

In Picturegoer, Lionel Collier called it a "well-made, taut little picture," noting also that Tafler "makes a good and credible job of the wide boy and Susan Shaw is convincing as his girlfriend ... There is plenty of ingenuity in the way the blackmailer goes to work. Ronald Howard's police inspector is an interesting piece of acting."

The Monthly Film Bulletin wrote: "Coincidence plays a large part in this story, which has action and movement but is not, as a whole, particularly competent. Sydney Tafler gives an efficient performance as Benny."

Kine Weekly wrote: "The picture, a tidy affair, moves briskly along Londen's seamy side. Sydney Tafler, as Benny, looks the part and delivers the apt dialogue convincingly. Melissa Stribling shows promise as Caroline, and the support is adequate. The salutary ending is perhaps a trifle confected, but even so the melodrama, for its size, carries quite a punch. The masses should find it both amusing and exciting."

Among later reviews, BFI Screenoline said that Hughes "displays a keen awareness of class differences and, although opportunities for character development are strictly limited by the film's brief running time, he manages to avoid caricature and sketches a series of contrasting milieus with the authenticity brought by the careful observation of detail. Hughes also takes the trouble to make sure that, while conventional morality is upheld, we retain some shred of sympathy for his wide boy.

The Independent wrote that the film "rarely features on the official list of 'great British films of 1952' but it does boast a winning performance from Sidney [sic] Tafler in the title role amid a bomb-ravaged London of quite amazing shoddiness."

Sight and Sound wrote "Ken Hughes' direction captures an existence of cheap dreams, 20-shillings-per-week lodging houses and harshly neon-lit streets; Tafler's "glycerine mouthed" spiv is far more charismatic than Ronald Howard's police inspector."

Filmink called it "stripped back, atmospheric entertainment, without an ounce of fat on it."

In British Sound Films: The Studio Years 1928–1959 David Quinlan rated the film as "mediocre", writing: "Story stretches the arm of coincidence to inordinate lengths."

== Radio, short story and TV versions ==
The radio play was meant to be broadcast by the BBC in February 1952 as part of the Curtain Up program. The play had been approved by Val Gielguld. It had been cast and rehearsed but was delayed due to concerns about its subject matter by Ken Adams, the controller of the Light Programme. Rienits wrote to Adams, "You have complained that it [play] is unsuitable but you do not specify on what grounds." Instead the BBC repeated a broadcast of Deep is the Roots.

The story was adapted for Australian radio in January 1953,. There were further Australian productions in September 1953 and 1956.

The short story of Wide Boy was published along with Rienits' novel Assassin for Hire in 1952 by Frederick Muller. The Mail said the story had "merit".

The story was also adapted for Australian TV, relocated to an Australian setting under the title Bodgie (1959).

=== Cast of January 1953 Australian radio version ===
- Alastair Duncan as Bennie
- Lionel Stevens as Charlie
- Joe Brennan as Sergeant
- Audrey Teasdale as Mavis
- Ray Barrett as Barman
- Brenda Dunrich as Caroline
- Nigel Lovell as Robert
- Ida Newton as Landlady
- Kerry Norton as Sally
- Ron. Whelan as Scott
- Kevin Brennan as Carson
- Frederica Shaw as Felicity
- Bruce Stewart as Narrator

=== Cast of September 1953 Australian radio version ===
- Robert Peach as Benny Mercer
- John Morgan as Charlie Mercer
- Reginald Wykeham as Scout
- Charles Crawford as Sergeant, First Voice, Secretary,
- Bettine Kauffmann as Mavis
- Reginald Wykeham as Barman
- Marcia Hart as Caroline Blaln
- Catherine McKenna as Landlady
- Williams Lloyd as Robert Mannering
- Betty Randall as Sally
- John Bluthal as Dancer, Constable, Third Voice, Taxi Man,
- Alven Powell as Waiter, Second Voice
- John Edmund as Stott
- Charles MacCallum as Carson
- Pauline Richard as Felicity

=== Cast of 1956 Australian radio version ===
- Keith Buckley as Benny Mercer
- John Bowen as Charlie Mercer
- lolanthe Slater as Mavis
- John Nash as Robert Mannering
- Margaret Wolfit as Caroline Blair
- Hector Lawrence as Inspector Carson
- John Miller as Sergeant Stott
- Geoffrey Baker as Barman and Waiter
- Betty Ross as Sally Martin
- Irene Alexander as Felicity and Secretary
- Harrv Cotterell as Policeman and Taxidriver
- Enid Elliott as Landlady
