= Hubert Clifford =

Australian-born British composer and conductor

Hubert John Clifford (31 May 1904 – 4 September 1959) was an Australian-born British composer, conductor and musical director for films.

== Education and early career ==
A native of Bairnsdale in rural Victoria, he studied chemistry before taking up music at the Melbourne Conservatorium, under Fritz Hart. He began making a name for himself in the late 1920s as a conductor, particular for his work with the Victorian Opera Company.

Following the advice of Hart (who himself had been a pupil of Charles Villiers Stanford) Clifford sailed for Britain in May 1930 to continue his studies at the Royal College of Music. There he was taught by C H Kitson and Vaughan Williams. In the mid-1930s he turned to teaching. While music master at the Beckenham County School for Boys in Kent he won a William Cobbett prize of £20 for composing an original Suite for School Orchestra. This became A Kentish Suite. A text book, The School Orchestra: A Comprehensive Manual for Conductors, was published in 1939.

== The BBC and film music ==
He joined the BBC in 1940, and was Empire Music Supervisor from 1941-1944, with frequent conducting duties for the BBC's overseas broadcast service. A photograph exists of Clifford with his friend and fellow-countryman, the composer and radio producer John Gough, and the British conductor Sir Henry Wood, inspecting the ruins of the Queen's Hall, London soon after it had been destroyed by German bombing on 10 May 1941. After leaving the BBC he began teaching at the Royal Academy of Music.

From 1944 until 1950 Clifford was Musical Director for Alexander Korda at London Film Productions, where (like his contemporaries in similar positions Muir Mathieson and Ernest Irving) he encouraged established classical composers to write for film, adapting and conducting their scores to fit the soundtrack. Notable commissions included Anna Karenina (score by Constant Lambert), The Winslow Boy, The Fallen Idol (both scores by William Alwyn) and The Happiest Days of Your Life (score by Mischa Spoliansky). Clifford also composed original scores of his own. During a second two-year stint at the BBC from 1952 Clifford became Head of Light Music.

== Personal life ==
He was married in 1931 and there were two children, Susan and Michael. During the 1950s Clifford's address was 'Belmore', Queen's Road, Cowes, Isle of Wight. He died of heart failure at the age of 55 in Singapore, where he was examining for the Associated Board.

== Selected concert works ==
Clifford's concert music is mostly orchestral and ranges from light overtures and suites to the wartime Symphony, completed in 1940. There is also a String Quartet from 1935. Many of his works have been recorded recently.

- A Pageant of Youth orchestral overture (1926)
- Voyage at Dusk - Fantasy for Orchestra (1928)
- Dargo: A Mountain Rhapsody (1929)
- Irish Comedy Overture (1930)
- A Kentish Suite for orchestra (1935)
- String Quartet in D (1935)
- Four Sketches from 'As You Like It' for string orchestra (1937)
- Victorian Polka (1939)
- The Casanova Melody for orchestra (1949) (orchestrated by Rodney Newton, 2000)
- Symphony 1940 (1940)
- Berceuses Anglaises for orchestra (1941)
- Five English Nursery Tunes suite for orchestra (1941)
- Serenade for Strings (1943)
- Shanagolden orchestral tone poem (1953)
- The Cowes Suite (1958)

== Selected filmography ==
- Left of the Line (Canadian Army Film Unit documentary, 1944)
- Anna Karenina (1948) (music director: score by Constant Lambert)
- Bonnie Prince Charlie (1948) (music director: score by Ian Whyte)
- The Fallen Idol (1948) (music director: score by William Alwyn)
- The Winslow Boy (1948) (music director: score by William Alwyn)
- The Third Man (1949) (additional music by Clifford under the pseudonym Michael Sarsfield)
- My Daughter Joy (1950) (music director: score by Raymond Gallois-Montbrun)
- Seven Days to Noon (1950) (music director: score by John Addison)
- The Happiest Days of Your Life (1950) (music director: score by Mischa Spoliansky)
- Mystery Junction (1951) (score composed by Clifford under the pseudonym Michael Sarsfield)
- Pandora and the Flying Dutchman (1951) (music director: score by Alan Rawsthorne)
- Cry, the Beloved Country (1951) (music director: score by Raymond Gallois-Montbrun)
- The Dark Man (1951)
- Hunted (1952)
- River Beat (1954)
- House of Secrets (1956)
- Hell Drivers (1957)
- The One That Got Away (1957)
- Bachelor of Hearts (1958)
