= John Harris (novelist) =

British novelist (1916–1991)

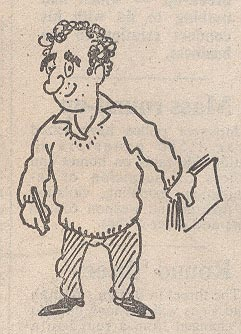
John Harris self-caricature from the late 1970s

John Harris (18 October 1916 – 7 March 1991) was a British novelist. He published a series of crime novels featuring the character Inspector Pel, and numerous war-themed books. He wrote with his own name, and also with the pseudonyms of Mark Hebden and Max Hennessy. His 1953 novel The Sea Shall Not Have Them was the basis for a feature film of the same name in 1954. He was the father of Juliet Harris, who published more Inspector Pel books under the name of Juliet Hebden.

== Biography ==
Harris was the son of Mr & Mrs E. J. Harris, of the Stag Inn, Herringthorpe. A product of Rotherham Grammar School, he worked for the Rotherham Advertiser from late 1932 or early 1933 as a reporter, later moving to the Sheffield Telegraph. Shortly before the Second World War, he and colleague Harold Evans briefly freelanced in Cornwall.

Harris later served in the Royal Air Force as a corporal attached to the South African Air Force. After the war he rejoined the Sheffield Telegraph as a political and comedy cartoonist (his creations included the Calamity Kids and Amateur Archie), and stayed until the mid-1950s. Following the outstanding success of his 1953 novel The Sea Shall Not Have Them, later in 1954 made into a film of the same name, he became a full-time author.

From 1955 he lived at West Wittering, near Chichester, West Sussex. His first published novel was The Lonely Voyage (1951), and he went on to write more than 80 works of fiction and non-fiction, including Covenant With Death (1961). He also wrote as Max Hennessy and Mark Hebden. As Hebden he published a series of crime novels featuring the character Inspector Pel.

He married Betty Wragg, daughter of Mr & Mrs H Wragg, of Tenter Street, Rotherham, at St Michael & All Angels Church, Northfield, Rotherham, on 31 January 1947. They had a son, Max (b 1949), who later moved to the USA; and a daughter, Juliet (b 1954), who later moved to France. Juliet continued the Pel detective series created by her father.

== Bibliography ==
=== As John Harris ===
- The Lonely Voyage (1951)
- Hallelujah Corner (1952)
- The Sea Shall Not Have Them (1953), US Title: The Undaunted
- The Claws of Mercy (1955)
- Getaway (1956), US Title: Close to the Wind
- The Sleeping Mountain (1958)
- Road to the Coast (1959), US Title: Adventure's End
- Sunset at Sheba (1960)
- Covenant with Death (1961)
- The Spring of Malice (1962)
- The Unforgiving Wind (1963)
- Vardy (1964)
- The Cross of Lazzaro (1965)
- The Old Trade of Killing (1966)
- Light Cavalry Action (1967)
- Right of Reply (1968)
- A Kind of Courage (1972)
- The Indian Mutiny (1973)
- The Gallant Six Hundred: A Tragedy of Obsessions (1973)
- Smiling Willie and the Tiger (1974)
- Ride Out the Storm (1975)
- Take or Destroy (1976)
- Army of Shadows (1977)
- The Fox from His Lair (1978)
- Cotton's War (1979)
- Swordpoint: A Novel of Cassino (1980)
- North Strike (1981)
- Without Trace: The Last Voyages of Eight Ships (1981)
- Harkaway's Sixth Column (1983)
- A Funny Place to Hold a War (1984)
- Up for Grabs (1985)
- The Thirty Days' War (1986)
- China Seas (1987)
- Picture of Defeat (1988)
- So Far from God (1989)
- Flawed Banner (1991)

- The Martin Falconer Series (for junior readers)

- The Fledglings (1971)
- The Professionals (1973)
- The Victors (1975)
- The Interceptors (1977)
- The Revolutionaries (1978)

- The Ira Penaluna Series (in chronological order)

- The Mustering of the Hawks (1972)
- The Mercenaries (1969), US Title: The Jade Wind
- The Courtney Entry (1971)

=== As Mark Hebden ===
- What Changed Charley Farthing (1965)
- The Eyewitness (1966)
- The Errant Knights (1968)
- Portrait in a Dusty Frame (1969), US Title: Grave Journey
- Mask of Violence (1970)
- A Killer for the Chairman (1972)
- The Dark Side of the Island (1973)
- A Pride of Dolphins (1974)
- The League of 89 (1977)
- Death Set to Music (1979)
- Pel and the Faceless Corpse (1979)
- Pel Under Pressure (1980)
- Pel Is Puzzled (1981)
- Pel and the Bombers (1982)
- Pel and the Staghound (1982)
- Pel and the Pirates (1984)
- Pel and the Predators (1984)
- Pel and the Prowler (1985)
- Pel and the Paris Mob (1986)
- Pel Among the Pueblos (1987)
- Pel and the Touch of Pitch (1987)
- Pel and the Picture of Innocence (1988)
- Pel and the Party Spirit (1989)
- Pel and the Missing Persons (1990)
- Pel and the Sepulchre Job (1992)
- Pel and the Promised Land (1993)

=== As Max Hennessy ===
-The Kelly McGuire Trilogy

- The Lion At Sea (1977)
- The Dangerous Years (1978)
- Back to Battle (1979)

-The Goff Family Trilogy

- Soldier of the Queen (1980)
- Blunted Lance (1981)
- The Iron Stallions (1982)

-The Dicken Quinney Trilogy

- The Bright Blue Sky (1982)
- The Challenging Heights (1983)
- Once More the Hawks (1984)
