= The Sleeping Mountain =

1958 novel by John Harris

- First edition
- Author: John Harris
- Language: English
- Genre: Adventure
- Publisher: Hutchinson
- Publication date: 1958
- Publication place: United Kingdom
- Media type: Print (Hardcover)
- Pages: 287 (Original edition)
- OCLC: 228212498

The Sleeping Mountain is an adventure novel by English author John Harris.

== Publication history ==
- 1959, UK, Companion Book Club ASIN B001H03S3I, 1 Jan 1959, Hardcover
- 1969, UK, Longman ISBN 978-0-582-53466-7 ISBN 0582534666, Dec 1969, Paperback
- 1972, UK, Hutchinson ISBN 978-0-09-113120-3 ISBN 0091131200, 29 Aug 1972, Hardcover 288 pages
- 1976, Ulverscroft Large Print Books Ltd ISBN 0-85456-486-1 ISBN 978-0854564866, Oct 1976, Hardcover 502 pages
- 2001, UK, House of Stratus ISBN 978-0-7551-0222-8 ISBN 0755102223, 31 July 2001, Paperback 318 pages
