= Martin Benson (actor) =

English actor (1918–2010)

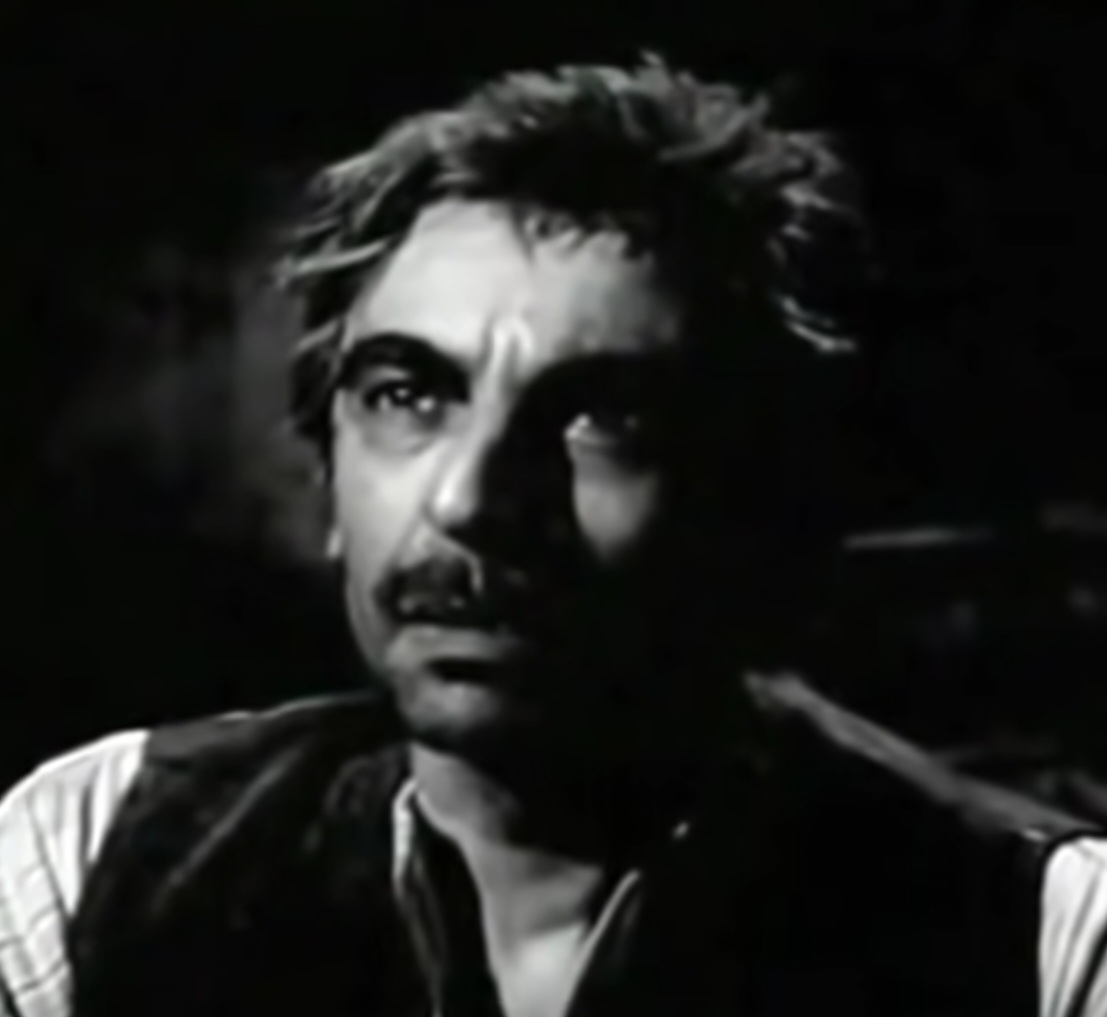
- Benson in the TV series One Step Beyond, episode The Sorcerer, 1961
- Born: Martin Benjamin Benson; 10 August 1918; London, England
- Died: 28 February 2010 (aged 91); Markyate, Hertfordshire, England
- Occupation: Actor
- Years active: 1942–2005
- Spouses: Joan Oliver (?–?) divorced; Joy Swinson-Benson (m. 1977–2010) (his death)

Martin Benjamin Benson (10 August 1918 – 28 February 2010) was an English actor who appeared in films, theatre and television. His credits include The Strange World of Planet X (1958), Once More, with Feeling! (1959), Exodus (1960), Five Golden Hours (1961), Cleopatra (1963), A Shot in the Dark (1964), Goldfinger (1964), Pope Joan (1972), The Omen (1976), Mohammad, Messenger of God (also 1976), The Sea Wolves (1980), The Hitch Hiker's Guide to the Galaxy (1981), and Angela's Ashes (1999).

== Early life ==
Benson was born in the East End of London, into a Jewish family, the son of a Russian-Jewish grocer and his Polish-Jewish wife who had left Russia at the revolution. After attending Tottenham Grammar School on a scholarship, he served in the 2nd Searchlight, Royal Artillery, during World War II. Stationed in Cairo, Egypt, he and Arthur Lowe founded the repertory company Mercury Theatre in Alexandria.

== Career ==
Benson is remembered for his role as the Kralaholme in the original London production of The King and I, a role he recreated in the Oscar-winning film version.

Appearing in films for over six decades, Benson played mostly supporting characters or villains. His films include The Blind Goddess (1948), Wheel of Fate (1953), Interpol (1957), The Strange World of Planet X (1958), Once More, with Feeling! (1959), Exodus (1960), Five Golden Hours (1961), A Shot in the Dark (1964), Pope Joan (1972), The Omen (1976), Mohammad, Messenger of God (also 1976), The Sea Wolves (1980) and Angela's Ashes (1999).

Benson also had an uncredited role in MGM's hit historical film, Ivanhoe, and in 1963 he acted in another historic film, as Ramos in Cleopatra (which also starred Elizabeth Taylor). Benson played both serious roles, such as Ali in Killers of Kilimanjaro (1959) and comic roles, such as Maurice in A Shot in the Dark.

In 1964, Benson appeared as Mr. Solo, the gangster who is killed by Goldfinger's henchman Oddjob in the James Bond film Goldfinger.

=== Television ===
Benson appeared in many roles on television. He played a barrister, using his own name, in the unscripted series The Verdict is Yours which ran for several years in the 1950s. Cases were shown and the previously unknown verdict was given by jury of viewers. In 1957 he made a guest appearance on The Jack Benny Show. In the same year he played the recurring character the Duke de Medici in the children's adventure series Sword of Freedom. In 1960 he appeared in the series Danger Man in the episode entitled "Position of Trust" as Fawzi. In 1981 he appeared in the television production of The Hitch Hiker's Guide to the Galaxy, albeit unrecognisable under the heavy make-up and costume of Prostetnic Vogon Jeltz, leader of the Vogon fleet sent to destroy Earth. His last appearance was in the TV series Casualty in 2005.

== Death ==
Benson died in his sleep on 28 February 2010, from natural causes.

== Filmography ==
=== Film ===
Year	Title	Role	Notes
1942	Suspected Person		Uncredited
1948	The Blind Goddess	Count Stephan Mikla	
1948	But Not in Vain	Mark Meyer	
1949	Trapped by the Terror	Prison Governor	
1949	Under Capricorn	Man Carrying Shrunken Head	Uncredited
1949	The Adventures of PC 49	Skinny Ellis	
1951	I'll Get You for This	Frankie Sperazza	
1951	Assassin for Hire	Catesby	
1951	Night Without Stars	White Cap	
1951	The Dark Light	Luigi	
1951	Hotel Sahara		Uncredited
1951	Mystery Junction	Steve Harding	
1952	Judgment Deferred	Pierre Desportes	
1952	The Frightened Man	Alec Stone	
1952	Wide Boy	Rocco	
1952	Ivanhoe		Uncredited
1952	The Gambler and the Lady	Pat	
1953	Top of the Form	Cliquot	
1953	Wheel of Fate	Riscoe	
1953	Recoil	Farnborough	
1953	Always a Bride	Hotel Desk Clerk	Uncredited
1953	Black 13	Bruno	
1953	Escape by Night	Guillio	
1954	You Know What Sailors Are	Agrarian Officer	Uncredited
1954	West of Zanzibar	Dhofar	
1954	Knave of Hearts	Art	Uncredited
1955	Passage Home	Gutierres	
1955	Doctor at Sea	Head Waiter	Uncredited
1956	Soho Incident	Rico Francesi	
1956	23 Paces to Baker Street	Pillings	
1956	The King and I	Kralahome	
1957	Istanbul	Mr. Darius	
1957	Doctor at Large	Captain Varolli	
1957	The Flesh Is Weak	Angelo Giani	
1957	Man from Tangier	Voss	
1957	Windom's Way	Samcar	
1958	The Strange World of Planet X	Smith	
1958	Sea of Sand	German Half-track Officer	Uncredited
1958	The Two-Headed Spy	Gen. Wagner	
1959	Make Mine a Million	Chairman	
1959	Killers of Kilimanjaro	Ali	
1960	Once More, with Feeling!	Luigi Bardini	
1960	Oscar Wilde	George Alexander	
1960	Sands of the Desert	Selim	
1960	The Gentle Trap	Ricky Barnes	
1960	The 3 Worlds of Gulliver	Flimnap	
1960	Exodus	Mordekai	
1961	Gorgo	Dorkin	
1961	Five Golden Hours	Enrico	
1961	A Matter of WHO	Rahman	
1962	The Silent Invasion	Borge	
1962	Satan Never Sleeps	Kuznietsky	
1962	Village of Daughters	1st Pickpocket	
1962	Captain Clegg	Mr. Rash	
1962	The Fur Collar	Martin Benson	
1963	Cleopatra	Ramos	
1964	Mozambique	Da Silva	
1964	A Shot in the Dark	Maurice	
1964	Behold a Pale Horse	Priest	
1964	Goldfinger	Mr. Solo	
1965	The Secret of My Success	Rex Mansard	
1966	A Man Could Get Killed	Politanu	
1967	The Magnificent Two	President Diaz	
1967	Battle Beneath the Earth	Gen. Chan Lu	
1972	Pope Joan	Lothair	
1973	Tiffany Jones	Petcek	
1976	The Omen	Father Spiletto	
1976	Mohammad, Messenger of God	Abu-Jahal	
1979	Meetings with Remarkable Men	Dr. Ivanov	
1979	The Human Factor	Boris	
1980	The Sea Wolves	Mr. Montero	
1981	Sphinx	Muhammed	
1988	Young Toscanini	Comparsa	Uncredited
1999	Angela's Ashes	Christian Brother	

=== Television ===
Year	Title	Role	Notes
1953–1956	Rheingold Theatre	Various	8 episodes
1954–1957	The Vise	Carlos/Ambroise Martin	2 episodes
1956	Colonel March of Scotland Yard	Dupont	Episode: "The Silent Vow"
1956–1957	Sailor of Fortune	El Sayid/Police Chief	2 episodes
1957	Assignment Foreign Legion	Various	3 episodes
1957	The Adventures of Aggie	Sheikh Feisal	Episode: "Tarboosh"
1957	The Jack Benny Program	Man Using Telescope	Episode: "Jack in Paris"
1957	The Adventures of Sir Lancelot	Hassim	Episode: "The Mortaise Fair"
1957	Overseas Press Club – Exclusive!	Dimitrios	Episode: "Santa Claus in a Jeep"
1957	The New Adventures of Martin Kane		Episode: "The Missing Daughter Story"
1957	O.S.S.	Tulio	Episode: "Operation Payday"
1957–1959	Sword of Freedom	Duke de Medici	27 episodes
1958	The New Adventures of Charlie Chan	Ahmed/Roberto Ricci	2 episodes
1958	The Invisible Man	Omar	Episode: "Crisis in the Desert"
1958	White Hunter	Piet Ritter	Episode: "Dead Man's Tale"
1958	The Verdict Is Yours	Counsel for the Paintiff	Episode: "The Case of the Offensive General"
1959	The Third Man	Karsos	Episode: "An Offering of Pearls"
1959	Dial 999	Waymac	Episode: "Special Branch"
1960	Interpol Calling	Ahmed	Episode: "Mr. George"
1960	The Army Game	Captain Strickley	Episode: "Bowler Hatting of Pocket"
1960	The Four Just Men	Captain Renald	Episode: "The Boy Without a Country"
1960–1965	Danger Man	Fawzi/General Ventura	2 episodes
1960–1961	The Charlie Drake Show	Fagin	2 episodes
1960–1963	ITV Television Playhouse	Various	3 episodes
1961	One Step Beyond	Klaus Karnak/Dr. Evans	2 episodes
1961–1965	No Hiding Place	Tomas Bexinga/Bernard Huntley	2 episodes
1962	Richard the Lionheart	Forked Beard/Jeweller	2 episodes
1962	The Verdict Is Yours	Prosecuting Counsel	2 episodes
1963	Ghost Squad	Zervas	Episode: "Death of a Sportsman"
1963	Suspense	John Haythorn	Episode: "The Uncertain Witness"
1963–1967	The Saint	Various	3 episodes
1965	BBC Play of the Month	Rezso Kantner	Episode: "The Joel Brand Story"
1966	The Wednesday Play	Rudi	Episode: "Why Aren't You Famous?"
1966	Court Martial	Padre Verga	Episode: "Achilles' Heel"
1967	Theatre 625	Eric Jan Hanussen/Joseph Scharff	2 episodes
1968	The Troubleshooters	Major General Hassef	Episode: "The Slight Problem with the Press"
1968	The Champions	Garcian	Episode: "Full Circle"
1973	The Adventurer	Nicky Asteri	Episode: "The Case of the Poisoned Pawn"
1974	A Little Bit of Wisdom	Sharkie	Episode: "The Magic Monkey of Kubla Khan"
1976	Thriller	Spiros Lemke	Episode: "The Next Victim"
1977	Jesus of Nazareth	Pharisee	2 episodes
1977	The Onedin Line	Ranocci	Episode: "The Hostage"
1977	The Professionals	Villa	Episode: "Long Shot"
1978	Return of the Saint	Elim	Episode: "One Black September"
1979	Telford's Change	Jacques Dupont	2 episodes
1980	BBC2 Playhouse	Schrayer	Episode: "Pews"
1981	The Hitchhiker's Guide to the Galaxy	Vogon Captain	2 episodes
1981	Tales of the Unexpected	Vasco	Episode: "The Way to Do It"
1986	The Clairvoyant	Browser	1 episode
1988	Wyatt's Watchdogs	Judge Goodman	Episode: "A Clot on the Landscape"
1989	Campion	Isaac Melchizadek	Episode: "Look to the Lady"
1989	The Bill	Craven	Episode: "Make My Day"
1992	The Camomile Lawn	Pauli	3 episodes
1998	Last of the Summer Wine	The Vicar	Episode: "The Only Disel Saxophone in the Country"
2005	Casualty	Rudy Goldspink	Episode: "Aftermath"
