= The Unforgiving Wind =

1963 novel by John Harris

- First edition
- Author: John Harris
- Language: English
- Genre: Adventure novel
- Publisher: Hutchinson
- Publication date: 1 January 1963
- Publication place: United Kingdom
- Media type: Print (Paperback)
- Pages: 316

The Unforgiving Wind is an Adventure novel by English author John Harris, first published in 1963 by Hutchinson.

The novel is about the disastrous expedition of Commander Adams and his men across the Arctic. The men are stranded at extreme temperature with their commander dead and radio damaged. The novel also depicts the struggle the protagonist Tom Fife has to go through to arrange a rescue operation when they are believed dead.

The novel is described by The Daily Telegraph as "A master of the gripping adventure yarn"

== Plot introduction ==
The novel is about the disastrous expedition of Commander Adams who dies suddenly. This novel follows the misfortunes of his men across the Arctic. Whatever can go wrong does go wrong as transport, instruments, health and sanity begin to fail. The team seem irretrievably lost in the dark Arctic winter, frightened and half-starving even when they find a base. Only one man can rescue them, the truculent Tom Fife who must respond to the faint radio signals coming from the Arctic shores. A powerful and disturbing novel, this story aims to take your breath away.

== Plot summary ==
An expedition is planned by Commander Adams across the Arctic. While in the Arctic, a storm wreaks havoc in the expedition. Most of the equipment including the radio is damaged. The team is finally able to find a base to stay with limited supplies. Storm, snow, ice, subzero temperatures all make living difficult. The team has to winter in the base with limited supplies. The winter is one long night that is 6 months long. Rescuers were not able to reach them because of ice formed in the sea during winter. Since the team lost contact everybody in mainland believes them to be dead because nobody will be able to survive a winter in the Arctic unsheltered. The team manages to survive because they were able to find a shelter, however they are half starved and health and sanity is on the fall. The team strongly believes Tom Fife will come with a search party to rescue them, however this is next to impossible for Tom Fife because everybody believes that all the team are dead. He is the only one who hopes to find them alive. He has to undertake tremendous personal strain, including losing his job, to force people to undertake the rescue mission. There is only a small window to do this rescue, as the ice will solidify making rescue impossible after summer. The team will not be able to survive another winter in the Arctic.

== Publication history ==
- 1963, UK, Hutchinson ASIN B001EOH50Y, 1 January 1963, Hardcover
- 1963, UK, Hutchinson ASIN B0000CLV9F, 1963, Unknown binding
- 1964, W. Sloane Associates ASIN: B0007E0EVO, 1964
- 2001, House of Stratus ISBN 978-0-7551-0227-3, 31 Jul 2001, Paperback
