= The Lonely Voyage =

1951 novel by John Harris

- 1954 paperback edition
- Author: John Harris
- Language: English
- Genre: Adventure novel, Bildungsroman
- Publisher: Hurst & Blackett
- Publication date: 1951
- Publication place: United Kingdom
- Media type: Print (Paperback)
- Pages: 281 (Paperback edition)
- ISBN: 978-0-7551-0218-1 (Paperback edition)
- OCLC: 59530558

The Lonely Voyage is an adventure novel by English author John Harris. It is his first novel.

== Plot introduction ==
This novel is about a boy, Jess Ferigo, who winds up on a voyage of poaching along with Pat Fee and Old Boxer. The story is about his journey into manhood.

== Publication history ==
- 2002, UK, House of Stratus, Incorporated ISBN 978-0-7551-0218-1 ISBN 0-7551-0218-5, July 2002, Paperback
