= Geoffrey Muller =

British film editor

Geoffrey Muller (1917–1994) was a British film editor. He worked a number of times with film director Ken Hughes.

== Selected filmography ==
- Mystery Junction (1951)
- The Floating Dutchman (1952)
- Wide Boy (1952)
- Counterspy (1953)
- Dangerous Voyage (1954)
- The Brain Machine (1955)
- Little Red Monkey (1955)
- Confession (1955)
- The Long Knife (1958)
- Horrors of the Black Museum (1959)
- Urge to Kill (1960)
