= Robbery Under Arms (radio adaptation) =

1950 BBC radio adaptation of the novel Robbery Under Arms

- Genre: Radio drama
- Running time: 30 mins
- Country of origin: UK
- Language: English
- Home station: BBC Radio
- Written by: Rex Rienits
- Original release: 1950
- No. of series: 1
- No. of episodes: 13

Robbery Under Arms is a 1950 BBC radio adaptation of Rolf Boldrewood's popular 1888 novel Robbery Under Arms.

The novel was adapted by Rex Rienits. It consisted of 10 episodes, each running 30 minutes.

The cast was almost entirely Australian. John Bushelle played the lead, with Edward Howell and Mary Ward supporting.

Rolf Bolderwood's daughter praised the adaptation.

The novel had been adapted for Australian radio in 1943.

== Episodes ==
1. Terrible Hollow (2 January 1950)
2. Captain Starlight (9 January 1950)
3. The Great Cattle Theft (16 January 1950)
4. The Prison-Break (23 January 1950)
5. Bushrangers! (30 January 1950)
6. Gold (6 February 1950)
7. The Betrayal (13 February 1950)
8. The Big Hold-up (20 February 1950)
9. The End Approaches (27 February 1950)
10. The End of the Story (6 March 1950)

== Cast ==
- Ralph Truman as Captain Starlight
- John Bushelle as Dick Marston
- Don Sharp as Jim Martson
- Edward Howell as Ben Marston
- Gwyndolyn Stewart as Mrs Marston
- Beryl McMillan as Aileen Marston
- Richard Beynon
