= Radio Waves (TV series) =

1978 New Zealand television series

- Created by: Graeme Farmer
- Written by: Grant Morris; Peter Kidd-Davis; Ken Catran; Graeme Farmer; Alan Trussel-Cullen; Robert Jesson; Ray Lillis; Arthur Baysting; Jan Farr; Olwynne MacRae; Sue McCauley
- Directed by: Mike Smith; Chris Bailey; Keith Hunter; Peter Sharp; John McRae
- Country of origin: New Zealand
- Original language: English
- No. of seasons: 1
- No. of episodes: 72

Production
- Producer: Tom Finlayson
- Running time: 30 minutes

Original release
- Release: April 17 – December 19, 1978

Radio Waves is a 1978 New Zealand television series set in a private radio station. Produced by Tom Finlayson, it began on 17 April and aired on Mondays and Tuesdays at 6:30pm, running until 19 December. Cast included Alan Dale as the station manager, Grant Bridger and Andy Anderson as deejays, Derek Payne as the sales manager, Rex Merrie as the assistant sales manager, Graeme Eaton and Glynis McNicoll as station shareholders, Jane Dyer as a copywriter and Keri Anne Johnson as the receptionist.

== Cast ==
- Ian Harrop as Maurice Judd
- Jacqui Dunn as Jess Davern
- Keri Anne Johnson as Julie Kerr
- Jane Dyver as Cath Deniston
- Alan Dale as Jack Delamore
- Andy Anderson as Paul Headley
- Grant Bridger as Win Savage
- Graeme Eto as Charles Lomax
- Glynis McNicoll as Greta Lomax
- Frances Edmond as Barbara Harris
- Maggie Maxwell as Miriana Erceq
- Rex Merrie as Blair Swift
- Derek Payne as Terry Wyman
- Hazel Cole as Emma
- Terence Cooper as Rex Latimer
- Jenny Ludlam as Kate Webster
- Lisa Smith as Cynthie Townsend
- Louise Joyce as Anita Wyman
- Bruce Allpress as Lionel Fletcher
- Bill Johnson as Peter Deniston
