= Rex Rienits =

Australian screenwriter (1909–1971)

- Born: Rex Gunther Rienits; April 17, 1909; Dubbo, New South Wales, Australia
- Died: April 30, 1971; London, Enfland
- Occupations: Journalist, playwright, screenwriter, historian
- Years active: 1920s-1971
- Notable work: Stormy Petrel
- Spouses: Vera Marjorie (div. 1932); Josephine Balfe (death 1954); Thelma (m. 1955; death 1971)
- Children: 2 (one predeceased Rienits)

Rex Gunther Rienits (17 April 1909 – 30 April 1971) was an Australian writer of radio, films, plays and TV. He was a journalist before becoming one of the leading radio writers in Australia. He moved to England in 1949 and worked for a number of years there. He later returned to Australia and worked on early local TV drama.

According to Richard Lane Rienits "was the most affable and generous of men; warm in his friendships, generous with his time and in his efforts to help those still with the ladder to scale. Above all, he was utterly dedicated to the propagation of Australian history, art and playwriting."

== Early life and career ==
Rienits was born in Dubbo. His father was a draughtsman for the Lands Department and moved from town to town early in Rienits' life. His mother died in 1925 and Rienits had one brother, Don.

Rienits' first job was as a copy boy on the Sydney Daily Guardian. He worked as a journalist and boxing promoter in Wagga Wagga. In 1935 he was working in Kyogle.

He moved to Sydney, where he continued to work as a journalist but also wrote for radio. In the early 1930s he worked at the Community Playhouse. He also wrote two of the earliest plays for Australian radio, Midnight Interlude and For Auction.

During the 1930s he mostly worked as a journalist but he also wrote radio plays in his spare time. In 1939 he helped form the Playwright's advisory board. He served for three years in the Australian army.

In the mid-1940s he prepared a document on the Eureka Rebellion which formed the basis of the 1948 film Eureka Stockade. He was hired by Henry Watt of Ealing Studios to prepare a research document which was used on the film. In 1947 he quit journalism and worked for 18 months in Sydney working for Ealing and Sydney radio. Among the plays he wrote included Stormy Petrel.

He later said "I realised that four or five years of this would kill any talent I had."

== England ==
Rienits moved to England in early 1949, hoping to work for Ealing, but he only ever did one project for them, the film Out of the Clouds. His big breakthrough was a popular radio adaptation of Robbery Under Arms which he sold to the BBC in late 1949. Shortly afterwards he sold the thriller Assassin for Hire, to the BBC. This launched his career in England. He followed it with another TV play, The Million Pound Note. He was dubbed by the Evening Standard as "TV's rising star of 1950."

Assassin for Hire was sold to the movies and the success of this led to offers to do three more scripts for Anglo-Amalgamated Productions starting with Wide Boy. In December 1951 he was reportedly one of the highest paid freelancers in Britain. His radio version of Wide Boy proved controversial when the BBC cancelled it at the last minute.

=== Australia ===
Rienits wife died in January 1954, prompting Rienits to return to Australia later that year. He stayed in Sydney for a year contributing to the script of Three in One and working for Colin Scrimgeour. He also wrote the script for Walk into Pardise.

"No one wanted to know me," he said later. He restored his fortunes writing the novel Jazz Boat which he sold to the movies.

He married again and returned to London where he worked writing The Flying Doctors for TV and radio.

Rienits returned to Australia in 1959 to be script editor for the ABC.

He wrote the first Australian historical TV series, Stormy Petrel, based on a radio serial of Rienits. This was so successful Rienits wrote a follow-up series The Outcasts.

Wide Boy was filmed for Australian TV as Bodgie. There were also Australian versions of Who Killed Kovali? and Close to the Roof. In August 1961 Rienits left Australia for London, spending some time in Tahiti. He was replaced as ABC drama editor by Philip Grenville Mann, who wrote the historical mini series The Patriots. Rienits wrote the next one, from London: The Hungry Ones.

== Later career ==
Rienits based himself in London for the rest of his career, writing regularly for BBC radio. He and his wife collaborated on a book Early Artists of Australia (1963).

He became editor in chief of the magazine Australian Heritage.

Towards the end of his life he and his wife wrote the book The Voyages of Captain Cook, The Voyages of Columbus and A Pictorial History of Australia. Sales of these three books exceeded 250,000. He died of a heart attack in 1971.

=== Personal life ===
His first marriage ended in divorce in 1932. His second wife Josephine Balfe, who came from an acting and journalism family, died in 1954. They had a daughter who died stillborn.

In 1955 he married a third time, to a former occupational therapist, Thea, who regularly collaborated on his projects as a researcher and co author. He was survived by a son.

== Selected writings ==
=== Radio ===
- Anti-Climax (1931) – a one-act play
- For Auction (1931) – a one-act play
- Art, for Art's Sake (1931) – a one-act play
- Midnight Interlude (1931) – a one-act play
- Reunion (1938)
- Margaret Catchpole (1945)
- He Found What He Wanted (1947)
- Stormy Petrel (1948) – serial – rebroadcast in 1953
- Robbery Under Arms (1949) – BBC radio adaptation of novel
- Fulfilment (1951)
- Wide Boy (1952)
- A Shilling for Candles (1953) adaptation of novel by Josephine Tey for BBC radio
- The Woman on the Beach (1953)
- Front Page Lead (1954)
- The Journey of Simon McEever (1954)
- Joseph Proctor's Money (1954) adapted from story by W. H. Lane Crawford
- Bligh Had a Daughter (1954)
- The Mapmaker (1957)
- Close to the Roof (1960)
- John Lancaster (1961)
- The Flying Doctor (1958–63) – serial
- Holiday Task (1961)
- Flynn (1963)
- The Last Outlaw (1966)
- Pride of the Pacific radio serial

=== Films ===
- Eureka Stockade (1949) – original research for screenplay
- Assassin for Hire (1951) – screenplay, based on his 1950 TV play – also a novel
- Wide Boy (1952)
- Noose for a Lady (1953)
- River Beat (1954)
- Fabian of the Yard (1954)
- No Smoking (1955)
- Out of the Clouds (1955)
- Cross Channel (1955)
- Count of Twelve (1955)
- Walk Into Paradise (1956)
- Three in One (1957)
- Smiley Gets a Gun (1958)

=== TV Plays ===
- Assassin for Hire (September 1950)
- The Million Pound Note (1950)
- Joseph Proctor's Money (1951) – TV play
- The Woman on the Beach (1955)
- The Bodgie (1959)
- Close to the Roof (1960)
- Who Killed Kovali? (1960)

=== TV Series ===
- The Passing Show (1951) (TV series) – writer of various episodes
- BBC Sunday Night Theatre – episode "No Smoking!" (1952)
- Patrol Car (1954) (TV series) – episode "Bombs in Piccadilly"
- The Vise (1955) (TV series) – "Count of Twelve"
- The Third Man (1959) – episode "Death in Small Installments"
- Jazz Boat (1960) – screenplay (original story)
- Jezebel (1963) – original story for episodes
- Riptide (1969) – story for episode "One Way to Nowhere"

=== Mini-Series ===
- Stormy Petrel (1960) – TV series
- The Outcasts (1961) – TV script
- The Hungry Ones (1963) – TV script

=== Books ===
- Eureka Stockade (1949) – non fiction
- Wide Boy (1952) – fiction
- Assassin for Hire (1952) – fiction
- (with Thea Rienits) Early Artists of Australia (1963) – non fiction
- (with Thea Rienits) The Voyages of Captain Cook (1968) – non fiction
- (with Thea Rienits) Discovery of Australia (1969) – non fiction
- (with Thea Rienits) The Voyages of Columbus (1970) – non fiction
- (with Thea Rienits) A Pictorial History of Australia (1977) – non fiction

=== Plays ===
- Slaves to Tradition (1931)
- Hide Out (1937) – co written with S Howard, produced at the Independent Theatre
- Lightning Strikes Twice (play) (1944)

(He also directed various plays including productions of Golden Boy)

== Notes ==
- Clark, Russell (14 September 1961). "The Bush Boy Who Wrote Outcasts". TV Times. pp. 8–9.
- Lane, Richard (2000). The Golden Age of Australian Radio Drama Volume 2. National Film and Sound Archive. pp. 97–99.
