= Richard Armstrong (writer) =

English author (1903–1986)

Ralph Richard Armstrong
- Born: 18 June 1903; Walbottle, Newcastle upon Tyne, Northumberland
- Died: 30 May 1986 (aged 82)
- Occupation: author
- Children: John (deceased)
- Writing career
- Language: English
- Subject: sea stories
- Notable works: The Mystery of Obadiah (1943); Sabotage at the Forge (1946)

Richard Armstrong (18 June 1903 – 30 May 1986) was an English writer who wrote for both adults and children. Most of his books were novels set at sea, or sea stories. For one of those, Sea Change, he won the 1948 Carnegie Medal from the Library Association, recognising the year's best children's book by a British subject. He is also known for a biography of Grace Darling in which he challenges the conventional story: Grace Darling: Maid and Myth (1965). He is often described on the cover of his books as "author and mariner".

== Biography ==
Ralph Richard Armstrong was born in Walbottle, Newcastle upon Tyne, Northumberland on 18 June 1903. He was a blacksmith's son who left school at thirteen to work in a Tyneside steelworks. He spent three years there, starting as an errand boy and progressing to greaser, labourer and crane driver. His book Sabotage at the Forge (1946), set in a steelworks, is highly regarded for its accurate and effective description of a boy's experience in such an environment. Similarly, The Whinstone Drift (1951) is convincingly set against a Northumberland coal-mining background.

After the First World War he went to sea in the Merchant Service and for seventeen years sailed in many types of vessel, gaining the experience which he later put to use in his books about seafaring. In 1937, he left the Merchant Service and pursued various occupations before concentrating on writing. His first published book was The Mystery of Obadiah (1943), an adventure novel set in Tynedale and featuring Thias Stringer, a 13-year-old boy. Sabotage at the Forge was its sequel, featuring Stringer at the steelworks. Later he drew on his wide-ranging experiences at sea, writing about, for example, cargo steamers (Passage Home), oil tankers (No Time for Tankers), and whalers (The Secret Sea).

Armstrong had a son, John, to whom he dedicated his book Sailor's Luck. He died in 1986.

== Selected works ==
Adult novels

- The Northern Maid (1947)
- Passage Home (1952) - Film 1955
- Sailor's Luck (1959)

Children's novels

- The Mystery of Obadiah (1943)
- Sabotage at the Forge (1946)
- Sea Change (1948)
- The Whinstone Drift (1951)
- Danger Rock (1955); U.S. title, Cold Hazard
- The Lost Ship (1956)
- No Time for Tankers (1959)
- The Lame Duck (1961)
- Island Odyssey (1963)
- The Secret Sea (1966)
- The Mutineers (1968)
- The Albatross (1970)

Nonfiction

- Grace Darling: Maid and Myth (1965)
- A History of Seafaring (London: Benn, 1967–69) – three 128-page volumes with maps and diagrams

Volume 1: The Early Mariners
Volume 2: The Discoverers
Volume 3: The Merchantmen

- Themselves Alone: The story of men in empty places (1972)
- Powered Ships (1975)

== See also ==
- MV San Demetrio
- Convoy HX 84
