= The Sea Shall Not Have Them =

1954 film by Lewis Gilbert

- VHS movie cover
- Directed by: Lewis Gilbert
- Written by: Lewis Gilbert; Vernon Harris
- Produced by: Daniel M. Angel
- Starring: Michael Redgrave; Dirk Bogarde; Anthony Steel; Nigel Patrick
- Cinematography: Stephen Dade
- Edited by: Russell Lloyd
- Music by: Malcolm Arnold
- Production company: Angel Productions
- Distributed by: Eros Films (UK); United Artists (USA)
- Release date: 30 November 1954 (UK)
- Running time: 91 minutes
- Country: United Kingdom
- Language: English
- Budget: £165,857

The Sea Shall Not Have Them is a 1954 British war film starring Michael Redgrave, Dirk Bogarde and Anthony Steel. It was directed by Lewis Gilbert and is based on the 1953 novel by John Harris, about a North Sea rescue during the Second World War. The musical soundtrack is by composer Malcolm Arnold.

The film title is the motto of the Royal Air Force's Air Sea Rescue Service. Gilbert called it "standard fare" but it "did very well."

== Plot ==
It is the autumn of 1944. Allied armies are sweeping through France towards Germany. A British Lockheed Hudson has been damaged in aerial combat with a German Messerschmitt, with both aircraft ditching in the North Sea, twenty miles off the Dutch coast. The four crew from the British aircraft are unable to send a complete mayday alert, although a signal fragment reaches England. Among them is Air Commodore Waltby who has a briefcase containing secret German plans for the successor to the V1 and V2. Flight Sergeant Mackay assumes a leading role in the rescue dinghy, tying everyone together to prevent anyone falling overboard, and sharing his boots with the pilot despite the cold. As the weather closes in and a freezing cold night descends, aircraft suspend their search, leaving the now waterlogged dinghy to face the sea alone. Waltby orders the others that if he dies, they must get the briefcase to London or throw it overboard should they face capture.

An RAF Air Sea Rescue sea launch joins the search. Commanded by Flying Officer Treherne, Launch 2561, or "Sixty One" in radio signals, struggles against the bad weather, mechanical problems and a fire in the galley. Second in command, Flight Sergeant Singsby dominates the crew, playing a benevolent but demanding hand with the questionable seamanship of the junior ranks. On the second day, updated intelligence about the dinghy's likely location is received from the downed German Messerschmitt pilot, whom the RAF has rescued. RAF Air Sea Rescue is now aware the dinghy has drifted inshore, far from its ditching point. As the weather clears, "Sixty One" sights the dinghy and approaches it under fire from enemy shore batteries and through a mine field. Launch 2561 safely returns to England where the briefcase with secret documents is delivered. An injured Flying Officer Treherne and Flight Sergeant Mackay are applauded by senior officers.

== Cast ==
- Michael Redgrave as Air Commodore Waltby
- Dirk Bogarde as Flight Sergeant 'Mac' Mackay
- Anthony Steel as Flying Officer Treherne
- Nigel Patrick as Flight Sergeant Slingsby
- Bonar Colleano as Sergeant 'Canada' Kirby
- James Kenney as Corporal Skinner
- Sydney Tafler as Corporal Robb
- Griffith Jones as Group Captain Todd
- Jack Watling as Flying Officer Harding
- Guy Middleton as Squadron Leader Scott
- Ian Whittaker as A.C.2 Milliken
- Paul Carpenter as Lt. Patrick Boyle, Sea Otter Pilot
- George Rose as Tebbitt
- Victor Maddern as Gus Westover
- Eddie Byrne as Petty Officer Porter
- Anton Diffring as German Pilot
- Gudrun Ure as Kirby's Fiancee
- Rachel Kempson as Mrs. Waltby
- Joan Sims as Mrs. Hilda Tebbitt
- Michael Balfour as Dray
- Nigel Green as Met. Officer Howard
- Glyn Houston as Knox
- Moultrie Kelsall as Wing Commander Dixon
- Jack Lambert as Squadron Leader Craig
- Michael Ripper as Botterhill

== Production ==
The film was based on a 1953 book by Max Hennessy, which became a best seller.

In August 1953, it was announced that both Rank and ABPC were competing for the film rights, which were expected to go for $20,000.

Producer Dan Angel arranged one of the strongest male casts of the era. It was one of a number of sea-related themes made in Britain following the success of The Cruel Sea. It was one of a number of war movies Anthony Steel made in which he supported an older British star.

There were six weeks filming on location in Felixstowe, followed by studio work at Riverside.

Referring to the film's title, Noël Coward said of the film's two male stars, "I don't see why not. Everyone else has." Redgrave was reportedly bisexual, while Bogarde was homosexual.

The film was shot at the Riverside Studios in Hammersmith and Felixstowe in Suffolk. Filming had finished by June 1954.

== Reception ==
=== Critical ===
Variety said the film "has several basic ingredients of a boxoffice success; tough but believable plot, a cast too big for the average theatre marquee and exciting action sequences in the climax when the missing air crew is picked up within range of enemy shore batteries."

=== Box office ===
According to Kinematograph Weekly it was a "money maker" at the British box office in 1955. The film performed poorly at the US box office, like most British war movies of this era. Gilbert said every one of the films he made with Danny Angel - six in all - were successful financially.
