= Alan Dale =

New Zealand actor (born 1947)

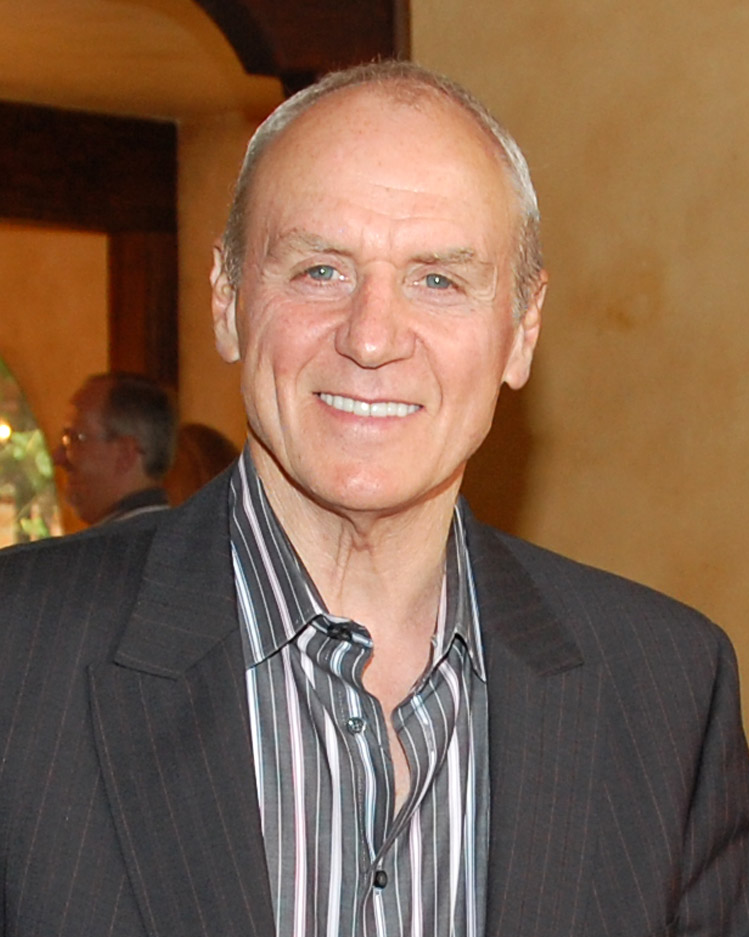
- Dale in 2009
- Born: Alan Hugh Dale; 6 May 1947 (age 79); Dunedin, New Zealand
- Occupation: Actor
- Years active: 1978–present
- Spouses: Claire Dale (m. 1968; div. 1979) Tracey Pearson (m. 1990)
- Children: 4

Alan Hugh Dale (born 6 May 1947) is a New Zealand actor. As a child, Dale enjoyed theatre and rugby. After retiring from the sport, he took on a number of occupations, before deciding to become a professional actor at age 27. Dale subsequently moved to Australia, where he played Dr. John Forrest in The Young Doctors from 1979 to 1982. He later appeared as Jim Robinson in Neighbours, a part he played from 1985 until 1993. He left the series when he fell out with the producers over the pay he and the rest of the cast received.

After leaving Neighbours, Dale found he had become typecast as Jim Robinson in Australia and struggled to find work. His career was revitalised after he relocated to the United States in 2000. Since then, he has had roles in many American series including prominent parts in The O.C. (as Caleb Nichol) and Ugly Betty (as Bradford Meade), as well as recurring and guest roles in Lost, 24, NCIS, ER, The West Wing, The X-Files, Entourage and Once Upon a Time. From 2017 to 2021, Dale starred in the soap opera Dynasty as Joseph Anders. Dale has also appeared in minor roles in films such as Star Trek: Nemesis, Hollywood Homicide, Indiana Jones and the Kingdom of the Crystal Skull, The Girl with the Dragon Tattoo and Captain America: The Winter Soldier, as well as the London West End production of Spamalot. Dale has been married to former Miss Australia Tracey Pearson since 1990 and has four children.

== Early life and work ==
"When I was 27, I started to get really jumpy and thought, what could I do that would give me the same buzz rugby did? Acting was what came to mind. I told my first wife, 'Look, I really can't stand it any more. I'm going to have to go and be an actor'."

— Dale on why he turned to acting professionally.

Dale was born on 6 May 1947 in Dunedin, New Zealand. One of four children, Dale enjoyed his childhood, but his family was relatively poor. Growing up in New Zealand without television, Dale loved rugby union, the theatre and amateur dramatics. His first performance was for a school concert, at the age of 13, doing an impression of comedian Shelley Berman. After moving northwards, his parents became founding members of an amateur theatre in Onehunga, Auckland called 'The Little Dolphin Theatre'. Dale often operated the stage equipment used to produce weather effects,

Dale was a skilled rugby player, but opted to move into drama instead because "the acting fraternity didn't like footballers and the footballers didn't like actors. [...] Acting gave me the same buzz and there was the chance of a longer career." He gave up rugby at the age of 21 because it was not considered a workable career at the time, and he had to support his family. Acting roles were limited in New Zealand so Dale worked in multiple jobs, including as a male model, a car salesman and a realtor. While working as a milkman he heard the disc jockey at his local radio station resign during a broadcast. Dale went over to the station and told the managers he could do a better job. They gave him a trial and then signed him up for the afternoon show. At the age of 27, he decided to become a professional actor.

== Acting career ==
=== Early roles and Neighbours ===
Dale's first professional acting job was playing an Indian in a production of The Royal Hunt of the Sun at the Grafton Theatre in Auckland. His first on-screen role came as radio station manager Jack Delamore in the New Zealand television drama Radio Waves in 1978. The show was not successful, running for a single season, but Dale described it as "nine months of solid work and great fun." In the late 1970s, Dale moved to Australia at the age of 32, due to the limited acting work in New Zealand. He applied to the National Institute of Dramatic Art in Sydney, but was rejected because he "was a lot older than anybody else on the course." He was soon cast as Dr. John Forrest in the Australian soap opera The Young Doctors, where he remained for three-and-a-half years until 1982.

In January 1985, Dale was cast in the continuing role of Jim Robinson in the Australian soap opera Neighbours, one of the twelve original characters conceived by the show's creator Reg Watson. He was appearing in a small role in the series Possession when he was offered the part of Jim by producer John Holmes. He replaced actor Robin Harrison, who had originally been cast in the role and had already filmed some scenes before his contract negotiations broke down. The scenes featuring Harrison's performance were re-shot with Dale. The character had intrigued Dale, who thought that parts of Jim's life echoed his own life at the time. He said "It's like it was written for me. It's a great role and naturally it's one I can really relate to. You have to be fairly similar to a character you play, otherwise you'd go insane." Dale chose to relocate from Sydney to Melbourne, where Neighbours was filmed, but commuted between the two cities for some time while he was still appearing on Possession.

He found working on Neighbours "exciting" and it enabled him to provide for his sons, but has spoken negatively about the show's producers, stating: "You were a totally replaceable commodity; [the production company] didn't put any value on any of the people appearing in the show." Dale appeared on the show from the first episode and stayed for eight years before his character was killed off in 1993, appearing in 1064 episodes. Dale quit the show due to feeling he and the rest of the cast were underpaid, and said he parted on "bad terms" with the production company Grundy Television. He expanded: "I didn't like it there, they were not nice people. When we decided that we hated each other, the company and me, one of the things the company did was to market everything they could out of us and pay us nothing." In 2018, Dale returned to Neighbours to film scenes for two episodes, which aired in December 2018 and March 2019, in each of which he appeared as Jim in a dream to Jim's son Paul. Of his return, Dale stated that it had "laid a load of ghosts to rest for me", regarding his original exit.

After Neighbours, Dale struggled to find work in Australia because he was typecast as Jim Robinson. His only regular sources of income were voice-overs, and publishing magazines about his former show which he "made quite a lot of money out of". He lost most of his profits investing in a failed children's magazine. Dale did have some minor acting roles during this time, including a single episode appearance in science-fiction show Time Trax (1994) and the pilot episode of Space: Above and Beyond (1995), the latter of which was an American series filmed in Australia. In 1999, he was cast in the American television film First Daughter, which was also filmed in Australia. After discovering he could perform a convincing American accent, Dale attended the film's premiere, finally moving with his family to the United States permanently in January 2000. Dale, his second wife Tracey, and their then two-year-old son Nick moved into an "awful little flat" in Los Angeles and found an agent. Dale recalled telling his wife in Melbourne that "there's no way this is going to work. But if it does, it proves you can do anything."

=== Wider success ===
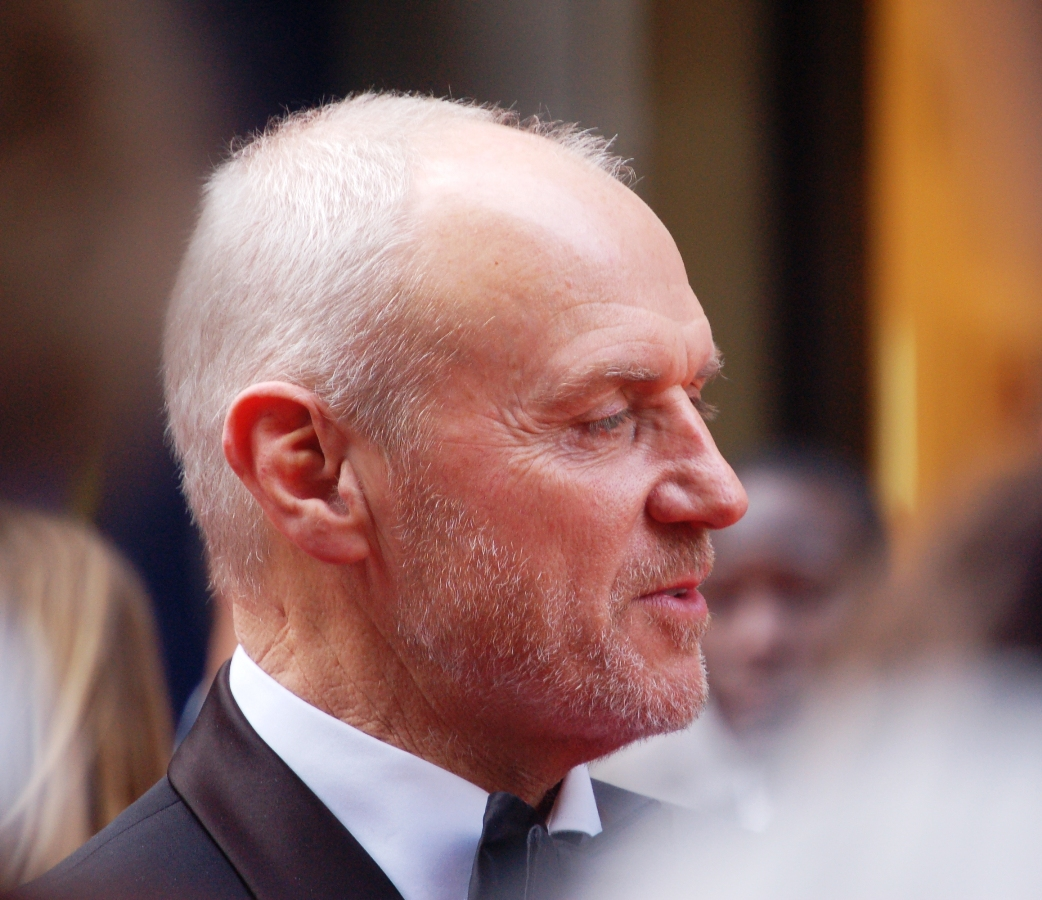
Dale at the 2008 BAFTA Television Awards

At the age of 52, he began to revive his career and started taking acting classes, something he had not thought about after being cast in Neighbours. He described his age, unknown status and willingness to work for a relatively low fee as being his main assets for getting work in America. His drama teacher, with whom he has remained ever since, told him "that you might want to play great roles, but truth is you will get cast as a specific type. Just work out your type. The others in the class said I was a bit Anthony Hopkins and a bit Sean Connery and that went into my head. I thought if I go for roles those guys would go for I'm more likely to get them." The first role he was offered was a part in a series called Sign of Life, a show about a rock band, which eventually fell through. Dale only received a couple of auditions during his first year in America, but his break came when he was cast as South African patient Al Patterson in four episodes of the medical drama ER between 2000 and 2001.

Following this, Dale saw a substantial increase in work, being described by The Times in 2008 as "busier than ever". Over the next two decades, Dale made appearances in numerous American and British television series. These included guest roles on The Lone Gunmen in 2001, The Practice in 2002, The West Wing in two episodes between 2002 and 2003 as Commerce Secretary Mitch Bryce, as well as appearing in three episodes, including the series finale, of The X-Files, playing the "Toothpick Man" in 2002. He played the recurring role of Vice President of the United States James Prescott for seven episodes of the second season of 24 in 2003, reprising the part in one episode of season three the following year. The character was originally supposed to appear in just a single scene, with a member of the casting team later telling Dale that they likely would have cast an actor more well known that he was at the time, had they realised how big the role would end up being. He also voiced the character in the video adaptation 24: The Game in 2006. Dale played NCIS Director Tom Morrow in two episodes of JAG in 2003, which served as a backdoor pilot for crime series NCIS, on which he reprised the role on recurring basis until its third season. He returned for several appearances between the show's tenth and thirteenth seasons.

He starred in the Fox TV series, The O.C. from 2003 to 2005, playing Caleb Nichol, a wealthy tycoon. The producers saw that the character had further potential and made his initially recurring role part of the main cast in the series. After 35 appearances, Caleb was killed off in the second-season episode "The O.Sea". Dale was disappointed that Caleb was written out and described it as a mistake by the production staff. In 2006, Dale was cast in the starring role of Bradford Meade, the owner of Meade Publications in the ABC show Ugly Betty. Although he impressed the producers in his audition, he initially lost the role to a "bigger star". After said star began "causing trouble" and was fired, Dale was given the part. Bradford was killed off during the show's second season. As part of the cast, Dale was nominated for the Screen Actors Guild Award for Outstanding Performance by an Ensemble in a Comedy Series in 2007 and 2008. Dale appeared in the second-season finale of Lost, "Live Together, Die Alone", as Charles Widmore, a businessman and leader of the Others. Dale's publicist was initially worried that Widmore (who was an integral part of the show's mystery) would become a starring role, meaning it would be hard for Dale to appear in both Lost and Ugly Betty at the same time. The part remained a recurring role, with Dale appearing numerous times throughout the remainder of the show's run, between seasons two (2006) and six (2010). He enjoyed the role but often found it difficult due to his character's unclear motivation. Dale was nominated for the Saturn Award for Best Guest Starring Role on Television for his performance in 2008.

Dale had recurring roles in the British serial Midnight Man and the Australian series Sea Patrol in 2008, as well as on Undercovers and the British series Moving Wallpaper as a fictional version of himself. He played John Ellis, the fictional owner of Warner Bros., on several episodes of Entourage between 2008 and 2011, and also reprised the role in the film adaptation in 2015. Dale also had a recurring role as King George in the series Once Upon a Time, and Emmett in Hot in Cleveland. Dale's other guest roles include: Torchwood in 2008, Californication in 2011, The Mindy Project in 2013, and Homeland in 2017. He was part of the main cast of Dominion, which ran for single season in 2014, playing General Edward Riesen.

In 2017, Dale was cast in The CW drama Dynasty, a remake of the 1980s soap opera of the same name. He played Joseph Anders the majordomo of the Carrington family, remaining part of the main cast until the show's fourth season in 2021, when Anders was killed off. Dale received praise for his performance, and Maureen Ryan of Variety called him "the best aspect of the new version of Dynasty", noting that "Dale improves every scene he's in." Patrick said, "Alan Dale is amazing as Anders. From the beginning, everybody wanted to be in a storyline with him." Three years after leaving Dynasty, Dale appeared in the second season of the BBC comedy horror series Wreck in 2024, playing Owen Deveraux. The following year he appeared as Aaron Cross in the Amazon Prime Video series The Assassin.

Dale has also made several film appearances. He appeared as the Romulan Praetor Hiren in Star Trek: Nemesis in 2002, a part he got after the actor originally cast fell ill, and had small parts in films such as Hollywood Homicide, After the Sunset, and the part of General Ross in Indiana Jones and the Kingdom of the Crystal Skull in 2008. Dale said his script for Kingdom of the Crystal Skull was printed on tin foil so it was impossible to replicate, in order to keep the film's plot a secret. He appeared in four films released in 2011: A Little Bit of Heaven, Priest, Don't Be Afraid of the Dark, and The Girl with the Dragon Tattoo, having joined late in the film's production. He played World Security Council member Councilman Rockwell in the 2014 Marvel Cinematic Universe film Captain America: The Winter Soldier.

On stage, in March 2008, Dale replaced Peter Davison in the lead role of King Arthur in the London West End production of Monty Python's Spamalot at the Palace Theatre. He accepted the role because he was a huge fan of Monty Python and considered that "life's too short" for him to have turned down a West End part. Although he has seen all of the Monty Python's Flying Circus sketches and Life of Brian, Dale had never seen Monty Python and the Holy Grail (from which Spamalot is "lovingly ripped off") and had to buy a copy to prepare for the role. It was not his first experience in musical theatre because he appeared in a 1984 Australian production of Applause, but Dale found the comic timing of the part to be the hardest task. "On stage, the battle is to find all of the humorous moments and not skip over them. [...] There's an art to Python humour and I'm aiming to try and get every single joke just right." He was succeeded in the role by Sanjeev Bhaskar on 23 June 2008.

== Popularity and acting style ==
Despite his mainstream success upon his move to America, Dale remained primarily known for his role as Jim Robinson in Neighbours in the United Kingdom and Australia for several years. This was spoofed in a promotional ident for the UK's Channel 4 in 2007 which sees Dale taking part in a mock interview about the sudden upturn in his career, before being accosted by an Australian fan, who recognises him as Jim Robinson. Discussing this association after Ugly Betty's 2007 Golden Globe win, Dale noted: "Every article I read I'm always, 'Ex-soap star Jim Robinson'. Maybe now people will just get to know me as actor Alan Dale." In 2007, Amazon.co.uk reported that they had sold more DVDs of films and television shows featuring Dale than any featuring other ex-Neighbours cast members.

Dale's characters on most of the American television shows he has appeared on have shared similar character traits, which Dale describes as the "go-to powerful guy". "I either play rulers of the world or the guy who kills the ruler of the world", he said, recalling that his age benefited him after moving to the US, because "A lot of the American middle-aged faces were too familiar, I came along and people were saying 'Who is this great new guy?' And I was cheap". Following his appearance as Senator Eaton in The Killing in 2011, reviewers commented on his tendency to play powerful, wealthy and mysterious characters in many shows. Maureen Ryan of TV Squad wrote that it was "lovely to see Alan Dale playing a typically Alan Dale-ian character. He's always so great at playing That Sketchy Wealthy Guy With a Hidden Agenda, which he has now played on, I believe, 87 different shows. And he always does it well." Coincidentally, Dale's characters in Neighbours, The O.C. and Ugly Betty have all been killed off by a fatal heart attack. Christopher Rosen of The New York Observer wrote in 2008 that "with his square jaw and seemingly no nonsense attitude, Mr. Dale is the go-to actor when casting directors need a conservative-looking authoritarian. When he comes onto the screen, audiences immediately take him seriously, since he radiates rich, smug and serious. He demands your respect." Rosen says that Dale is "not even...a particularly good actor" but is "fine enough" and "bring[s] a no frills, no gimmicks style to his roles," and "manages to give a consistent performance in every show he appears on."

Jayne Nelson, writing in magazine SFX, named Dale the second most "serial" science-fiction guest star after Mark Sheppard. She wrote: "The thing is, soap-opera origins aside, Dale is always good. Which is why he keeps getting so much work....Dale never lets you down, always (well, usually) summoning up a pitch-perfect accent, too. There's something comforting about his presence on a show, as though the fact he's in it has lent it some weight." In a profile of his work on "cult shows", Ben Rawson-Jones of Digital Spy called Dale an "institution". Writing for The Spinoff in 2016, Katie French called Dale "New Zealand's greatest living television actor" and "to the small screen what Sam Neill is to the big. A pioneer in the first wave of high concept American television, he is one of our most precious, prolific and lucrative exports."

== Personal life ==
"I like both places [Australia and New Zealand] but I get a lot more respect and recognition from Australia than I do in New Zealand. New Zealanders don't want to know me at all, really. I've been Australian for 20-odd years. Everywhere I went I was the guy from Neighbours so I was Australian. Then when I came here [Hollywood], because I have a New Zealand passport I became a New Zealander again. It's odd."

— Dale on his nationality.

In 1968, Dale married his girlfriend, Claire. The couple had two children, Simon and Matthew, The marriage ended in divorce in 1979. At the time, Dale lived in Auckland but after the divorce he moved to Sydney with his sons. Simon would become a radio disc jockey with Kiss 100.

In April 1990, he married Tracey Pearson, the 1986 Miss Australia, whom he met at the 1986 Australian Grand Prix, when she was 21 and he was 39. Dale described it as "the most appropriate relationship I've ever had." Dale also has two children from this marriage, Daniel and Nick.

He and his family live in Manhattan Beach, California and also owns property in Australia. Dale sold his holiday home in New Zealand in 2011 for $1.25m. Both of Dale's parents died in 2007. Dale describes his life philosophy as being Winston Churchill's quote "Never, never, never give up", and counts Gene Hackman as his "big acting hero".

== Filmography ==
=== Films ===
Year	Title	Role	Notes
1989	Houseboat Horror	Evans	Direct-to-video release
2002	Rent Control	George	
2002	Star Trek: Nemesis	Praetor Hiren	
2003	The Extreme Team	Richard Knowles	
2003	Hollywood Homicide	Commander Preston	
2004	Straight Eye: The Movie	Kelly's Dad	
2004	After the Sunset	Security Chief	
2008	Indiana Jones and the Kingdom of the Crystal Skull	General Ross	
2011	Happy New Year	Bill	
2011	A Little Bit of Heaven	Dr. Sanders	
2011	Priest	Monsignor Chamberlain	
2011	Don't Be Afraid of the Dark	Jacoby	
2011	The Girl with the Dragon Tattoo	Detective Isaksson	
2012	Tangled Ever After	Priest	Short film; voice
2014	Captain America: The Winter Soldier	Councilman Rockwell	
2014	Grace	Father John	
2015	Entourage	John Ellis	
2017	Tangled: Before Ever After	Vicar	TV Movie

=== Television ===
Year	Title	Role	Notes
1978	Radio Waves	Jack Delamore	36 episodes
1979–1982	The Young Doctors	Dr. John Forrest	1,089 episodes
1985–1993, 2018–2019	Neighbours	Jim Robinson	1066 episodes
1986	The Far Country	Dave Marshall	Two-part television film
1994	Janus	Richard Issacs	2 episodes
1994	Time Trax	Mr. Bergdorf	Episode: "The Crash"
1995	Plainclothes	Senior Sergeant Mitch Mitchell	26 episodes
1995	Space: Above and Beyond	Colonial Governor Borman	Episode: "Pilot"
1997	Frontline	Dave	Episode: "Dick on the Line"
1997	Blue Heelers	Rod Wright	Episode: "Off the Air"
1997–1998	State Coroner	Dudley Mills	8 episodes
1999	Alien Cargo	Eichhorn	Television film
1999	First Daughter	Daly	Television film
2000	Sir Arthur Conan Doyle's The Lost World	Phelan	Episode: "The Chosen One"
2000–2001	ER	Al Patterson	4 episodes
2001	Signs of Life	Clive	Episode: "Pilot"
2001	The Lone Gunmen	Michael Wilhelm	Episode: "Eine Kleine Frohike"
2001	Philly	Bruce Frohman	Episode: "Loving Sons"
2002	The X-Files	Toothpick Man	3 episodes
2002	American Dreams	Captain Andrews	Episode: "Soldier Boy"
2002	The Practice	Judge Robert Brenford	Episodes: "The Good Fight" and "Silent Partners"
2002–2003	The West Wing	Secretary of Commerce Mitch Bryce	Episodes: "20 Hours in America, Part I" and "Twenty Five"
2003	JAG	NCIS Director Tom Morrow	Episodes: "Ice Queen" and "Meltdown"
2003	CSI: Miami	Canadian Consulate General Dubay	Episode: "Blood Brothers"
2003–2004	24	Vice President Jim Prescott	8 episodes (seasons 2–3)
2003–2005	The O.C.	Caleb Nichol	35 episodes (seasons 1–2)
2003–2005, 2013–2016	NCIS	NCIS (later Homeland) Director Tom Morrow	Reprised character from JAG; 14 episodes (seasons 1–3, 10–13)
2004	Crossing Jordan	Carl Logan	Episode: "Slam Dunk"
2005	E-Ring	Raymond Metcalf	3 episodes
2005	Bow	"Bow Wow's gay English butler"	Episode: "Pilot"; series not picked up
2006–2010	Lost	Charles Widmore	17 episodes (seasons 2–6)
2006–2007	Ugly Betty	Bradford Meade	35 episodes (seasons 1–2)
2008	Torchwood	Dr. Aaron Copley	Episode: "Reset"
2008	Midnight Man	Donald Hagan	3 episodes
2008	Sea Patrol	Ray Walsman	6 episodes
2008–2011	Entourage	John Ellis	5 episodes (seasons 5–8)
2009	Flight of the Conchords	Australian Ambassador	Episode: "The Tough Brets"
2009	Moving Wallpaper	Himself/John Priest	6 episodes; Dale plays a fictionalised version of himself and stars in the show-within-a-show Renaissance.
2009	Law & Order: Special Victims Unit	Judge Joshua Koehler	Episode: "Liberties"
2010	Important Things with Demetri Martin	Mob Boss	Episode: "Attention"
2010	Burn Notice	Ken Bocklage	Episode: "Entry Point"
2010	Undercovers	James Kelvin	5 episodes
2011	Californication	Lloyd Alan Phillips Jr.	Episode: "The Recused"
2011	Doomsday Prophecy	General Slade	Television film
2011	Person of Interest	Kohl	Episode: "Foe"
2011–2012	The Killing	Senator Eaton	6 episodes (seasons 1–2)
2011–2013, 2017	Once Upon a Time	King George/Albert Spencer	9 episodes (seasons 1–2,6); Also narrated the clip show "The Price of Magic"
2012	House of Lies	Jonathan Strauss	Episode: "Microphallus"
2012	Unsupervised	Sid	Episode: "Jesse Judge Lawncare Incorporated"
2012	Beauty and the Beast	Emperor Dorian	Episode: "Pilot"; series not picked up
2012–2013	Hot in Cleveland	Sir Emmett Lawson	8 episodes
2013	Body of Proof	Emmett Harrington	Episode: "Breakout"
2013	The Mindy Project	Alfred	Episode: "Sk8er Man"
2013	Auckland Daze	Alan/Himself	3 episodes
2014	Dominion	General Edward Riesen	16 episodes
2015	Top Coppers	Frank	Episode: "The Chill of the Cockney Freezer"
2016	CSI: Cyber	Richard Mangolin	Episode: "Fit-and-Run"
2016	Secret City	Prime Minister Martin Toohey	6 episodes
2016	Graves	Trevor Lloyd	Episode: "Lions in Winter"
2017	Homeland	President Morse	Episode: "The Return"
2017–2021	Dynasty	Joseph Anders	73 episodes (seasons 1–4);
2019	Tangled: The Series	Vicar	Episode: "Rapunzeltopia"
2024	Wreck	Owen Deveraux	3 episodes
2025	Assassin	Aaron Cross	4 episodes
2026	The Killings at Parrish Station	Callum Parrish (Present Day)	6 episodes

=== Video games ===
Year	Title	Role
2002	X-Men: Next Dimension	Additional voices
2004	EverQuest II	Dawson Magnificent, Generic High Elf
2005	Yakuza	Masa Sera
2006	24: The Game	Vice President Jim Prescott
2012	Mass Effect 3	Henry Lawson; Captain Aaron Sommers
2013	The Bureau: XCOM Declassified	Dr. Alan Weir

=== Theatre ===
Year	Title	Role	Notes	Ref.
1969	You Can't Take It With You	Tony Kirby	St Andrew's Hall, Auckland	
2008	Spamalot	King Arthur	Palace Theatre, London with Grafton Theatre for Auckland Festival	
2026	Retrograde	Mr Parks	Arts Centre Melbourne	
