= River Beat =

1954 British film by Guy Green

- Directed by: Guy Green
- Written by: Rex Rienits
- Produced by: Herman Cohen; Victor Hanbury
- Starring: John Bentley; Phyllis Kirk; Leonard White; Glyn Houston
- Cinematography: Geoffrey Faithfull
- Edited by: Peter Graham Scott
- Music by: Hubert Clifford
- Production company: Insignia Films
- Distributed by: Eros Films; Lippert Pictures (US)
- Release date: 29 March 1954
- Running time: 70 minutes
- Country: United Kingdom
- Language: English

River Beat is a 1954 British second feature crime film directed by Guy Green and starring John Bentley, Phyllis Kirk and Leonard White. It was written by Rex Rientis and distributed in the United States by Lippert Pictures.

== Plot ==
Judy is a radio operator on an American ship duped into smuggling diamonds in the belief that she is delivering cigarettes. Stopped by Customs she is in further trouble when the man who involved her is found dead in the river. Customs Detective Dan Barker has fallen for Judy and faces a moral dilemma: he must find out whether or not she is guilty, while protecting her from the smugglers.

== Cast ==
- John Bentley as Detective Inspector Dan Barker
- Phyllis Kirk as Judy Roberts
- Robert Ayres as Watford
- Leonard White as Detective Sergeant Mack McLeod
- Glyn Houston as Charlie Williamson
- Patrick Jordan as Bert Fisher
- Ewan Roberts as Customs Inspector J.S. Blake
- David Hurst as Paddy McClure
- Charles Lloyd-Pack as John Hendrick
- Isabel George as Anna
- Margaret Anderson as Nell, Charlie's girl
- Harold Ayer as Joseph Benson, alias Alfred Gordon
- Tony Hilton as Harry, the bartender
- Jack McNaughton as Hickson
- Dermot Palmer as Wayne
- Colin Douglas as Harbor Patrol superintendent
- Bill Nagy as Eddie, deckhand
- Michael Browning as Detective Perry
- Michael Balfour as Adams, sailor
- Peter Collingwood as surgeon
- Warwick Ashton as Constable
- Eric Corrie as Constable

== Production ==
The film was shot at Walton Studios and on location around London. Glimpses of street signs include Raby Street, E14, and the former Horns and Horseshoe public house, at 10 Cable Street, E1, next door to what is now the Jack the Ripper Museum. The film's sets were designed by art director John Stoll.

It was Guy Green's first film as a director. He said Phyllis Kirk was "very helpful".

== Reception ==
On the film's release Variety said "The programmer market, currently short of passable supporting filmfare, will find this London-localed melodrama an acceptable filler ... Miss Kirk provides a casting switch to the Anglo-American film efforts Lippert usually releases. Heretofore it has been an American male in England, and mixed up with Scotland Yard and British crooks. ... The plotting is contrived and everything drops too patly into place as the 70 minutes unfold."

The Monthly Film Bulletin wrote: "A competent little thriller, which maintains a good pace and has a fairly simple plot with one or two interesting twists. It has no pretensions to anything further; there is little attempt at characterisation, or to show much of the work of the River Police. The film, however, owes something to the tradition of the semi-documentary feature in its use of well-photographed locations in and around the Thames and Dockland."

In British Sound Films David Quinlan rates the film "good", calling it a "well-acted, well-paced, well-set thriller: well above-average."

Chibnall & McFarlane, in The British B Film: The Studio Years 1928–1959 rate the film as "exceptional in its use of docklands locations and pacey action."
