= Passage Home =

1955 British film by Roy Ward Baker

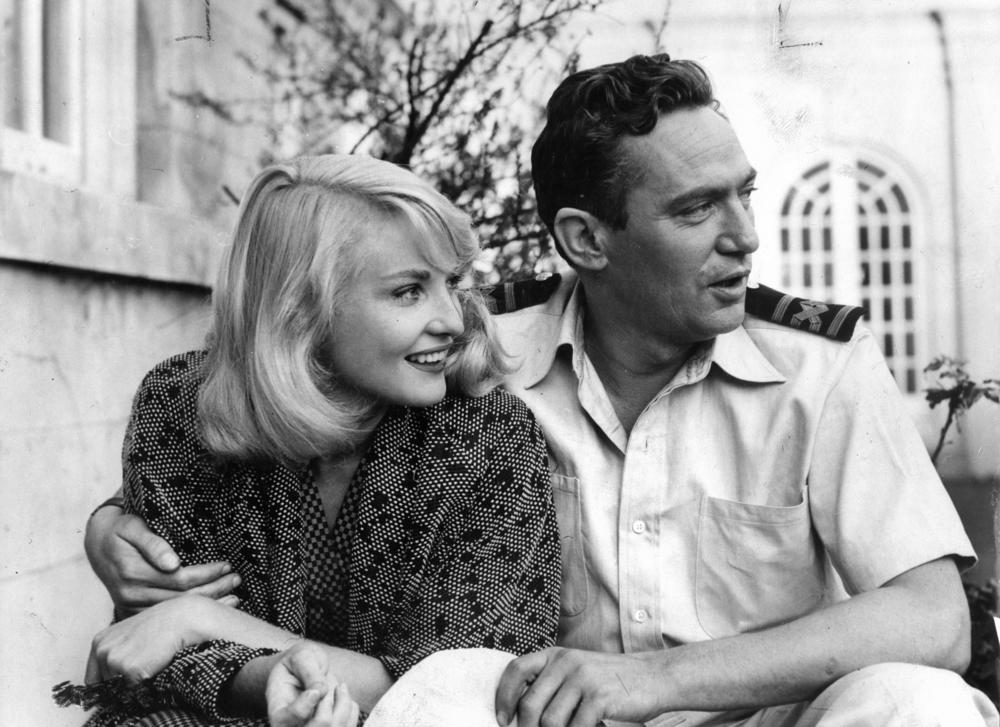
- Diane Cilento with Peter Finch during the making of the film
- Directed by: Roy Ward Baker
- Written by: William Fairchild
- Story by: novel by Richard Armstrong
- Produced by: Julian Wintle
- Starring: Anthony Steel; Peter Finch; Diane Cilento
- Cinematography: Geoffrey Unsworth
- Edited by: Sidney Hayers
- Music by: Clifton Parker
- Distributed by: General Film Distributors (UK)
- Release date: April 1955 (UK)
- Running time: 102 minutes
- Country: United Kingdom
- Language: English
- Budget: £250,000

Passage Home is a 1955 British drama film directed by Roy Ward Baker and starring Anthony Steel, Peter Finch and Diane Cilento. The screenplay was by William Fairchild based on the 1952 novel of the same name by Richard Armstrong.

== Plot ==
Captain "Lucky" Ryland is about to retire. He has a flashback of several years to a voyage on a merchant ship which he was captaining from South America. He is forced to give passage to a British governess, Ruth Elton, who is returning to England.

Both Ryland and his second mate, Vosper, fall for Ruth. Ryland proposes to Ruth and when she turns down his offer he tries to rape her in his cabin but she is rescued by Vosper. The ship survives a very severe storm in which Vosper saves Ruth's life outside on deck after which Ruth and Vosper realize that they are in love with each other.

There is a subplot about the dissatisfaction of the ship's crew with being fed rotten potatoes, which Ryland has bought cheaply simply to save money. Ryland says a good cook would still be able to use them productively. The potatoes are dumped overboard and Ryland is determined to find out who is responsible by offering the crew £5 for any information as to who did it. Vosper accuses Shorty, who is acting oddly, and they fight. Ike intervenes and fights Vosper. Shorty then confesses to Ike but Ike takes the blame. Probably due to the fight, Ike, who is already known to be ill, takes to his bed and dies. He is buried at sea in a makeshift coffin.

At the allotted time of the funeral Ryland is drunk, drowning his sorrow in whisky due to being rejected by Ruth (whom he had seriously assaulted, ripping her dress). The Red Ensign is flown at half mast. Ryland struggles to find the right pages in the Book of Common Prayer and loses his place. When the body is slid overboard they recite the Lord's Prayer.

That night Ryland is even more drunk. The steward brings his dinner and he rudely demands that he "do his job" and tidy his room. A violent storm is throwing things around. The ship is in trouble but Ryland musters himself and manages to give logical instructions to get her through the storm. Down below the engineer struggles to keep up the power. In the hold things start sliding and Shorty is crushed by a crate holding a bull while pushing Burns to safety. They head for "The Lizard". Ruth goes on deck and is in danger of being swept away when part of the safety railing is destroyed. Vosper saves her and carries her to her cabin where they kiss.

Coming out of flashback, Ruth and Vosper are now married and are attending Ryland's retirement function. Ryland shakes her hand and calls her "Mrs Vosper". The film ends with Ruth looking at Ryland in tears because she still has feelings for Ryland after all of the years.

== Cast ==
- Anthony Steel as Second Mate Vosper
- Peter Finch as Captain Lucky Ryland
- Diane Cilento as Ruth Elton
- Cyril Cusack as Bohannon the steward
- Geoffrey Keen as Ike the bosun
- Hugh Griffith as Pettigrew the engineer
- Duncan Lamont as 1st Mate Llewellyn
- Gordon Jackson as Ted Burns
- Bryan Forbes as Shorty
- Michael Craig as Burton
- Robert Brown as Shane
- Martin Benson as Gutierres
- Patrick McGoohan as McIsaacs
- Michael Bryant as Stebbings
- Sam Kydd as Sheltia
- Glyn Houston as Charley Boy
- Patrick Westwood as Oglethorpe
- George Woodbridge as Yorkie

== Production ==
It was Roy Ward Baker's first film back in England after working for several years in Hollywood where he had made three thrillers (Don’t Bother to Knock, Night without Sleep and Inferno) before being fired off White Witch Doctor. Baker's biographer would later write "although he [Baker] was disappointed in the eventual result Passage Home was the quintessential 1940s and 1950s Baker film – classical in style and melodramatic/generic in its basic structure... it conveys a quiet, pervasive sense of despair in its storyline, involving melancholy and sexual repression."

The script was by William Fairchild who had written Morning Departure (1950), also directed by Baker. The director called it "a bomb in the bomb locker story... all pretty formula stuff. It's not very good... The whole film should have been set in 1885 on a sailing ship. It was sort of a Victorian film. It just didn't work as a modern day film." He added "there was this fatal flaw, it was an old-fashioned story in an almost contemporary setting and it didn’t really work." It was a rare drama from Group Film Productions - the main production arm of Rank - to focus on a female character.

Baker felt the "only interesting thing about" the film was it used a new form of back projection, a blue backing system, or the travelling matte. This technique allowed the foreground to be separated from the background, enabling a moving matte behind which the desired background could be inserted later. Baker claimed this was used in 60% of the movie. It was the first Rank film shot in VistaVision.

Baker called Finch "probably more of a theatre actor than a cinema actor. I liked him. He was a wonderful sort of con-man — he had about three different life stories he would tell you, all completely different and hilariously funny. I really don’t know what the truth was and I didn’t care. He was such great fun and a very, very good actor. Passage Home had a marvellous cast."

Diane Cilento's casting was announced in September 1954. She was cast after producer Julian Wintle had seen 60 people. Cilento had only recently appeared on stage in The Big Knife and signed a five-year contract with Alex Korda. Her co star was Peter Finch, a fellow Australian.

The film was shot at Pinewood Studios in November 1954. It was the first film Finch made under a new five-year contract with the Rank Organisation.

It was also the first film Michael Craig made under contract to Rank. He said filming went for over three months and was impressed by the set, saying "the art department, if no one else, had done us proud."

Cilento wrote in her memoirs that there was an ego clash between Steel and Finch on set although it was "a mismatch" because of Finch's greater skill as an actor. Cilento says that Finch was exhausted during filming because of an affair he was having with Vivien Leigh. However she says Finch challenged Steel to drinking competitions at lunch which resulted in Steel being unable to handle his lines in the afternoon.

Baker said "the film went out and they probably made a bit of money on it. It was certainly well made. It was a splendid production, storm sequences and all that stuff."

== Reception ==
The Monthly Film Bulletin wrote: "This is a film made with considerable if impersonal accomplishment, and an efficient surface realism; the story has promising elements, and there is evidence of determination in the writing generally to get beyond the stereotype in the characterisations of the crew of the Bulinga. To a limited extent, it succeeds, and the supporting figures achieve a measure of individuality. The main situation, however, is insufficiently explored. Only Ryland (played with an effective, sullen concentration by Peter Finch) emerges as a fully rounded figure; Ruth (Diane Cilento, a clearly interesting personality here none too happily cast) remains an elusive, too passive character, and Vosper (Anthony Steel) is colourless. The triangle situation, anyway, is lost at its crisis by the intervention of the storm, a deus ex machina in disguise which takes up an unconscionable amount of footage. There are good minor performances by Gordon Jackson, Bryan Forbes and Cyril Cusack."

Filmink argued the film would have been more successful if it was a war film.

Academic Jeffrey Richards argued the movie, with its "bleak pessimistic universe", fit very much into the type of film Baker regularly made. "He returned again and again to the theme of ordinary people put into extraordinary situations, pushed to the edge and tested to the limit. How they cope is explored with extraordinary observation, sensi¬ tivity and insight. It is this preoccupation that links his psychological thrillers and his maritime dramas."

Baker's biographer argued the film "might just be, in terms of its depiction of repression, the quintessential British film of the 1950s."
