= Sydney Tafler =

British actor (1916–1979)

- Born: 31 July 1916; Hackney, London, England
- Died: 8 November 1979 (aged 63); Richmond upon Thames, Surrey, England
- Education: Royal Academy of Dramatic Art
- Occupation: Actor
- Years active: 1936–1980
- Spouse: Joy Shelton (1944–1979)

Sydney Tafler (31 July 1916 – 8 November 1979) was an English actor who after having started his career on stage, was best remembered for numerous appearances in films and television from the 1940s to the 1970s.

== Personal life ==
Tafler was born into a Jewish family, the son of Eva (née Kosky) and Mark Tafler, an antique dealer. His sister, Hylda, married the film director Lewis Gilbert. Another sister, Sheila, was also an actress.

He was married to the actress Joy Shelton from 1941 until his death from cancer; they had three children – two sons, Jeremy and Jonathan, and a daughter, Jennifer, who became a child actress.

== Career ==
After two years at the Royal Academy of Dramatic Art, Tafler first appeared on stage in London's West End in 1936, with Sir Seymour Hicks in The Man in Dress Clothes. From 1943 to 1946 he played many Shakespearean roles with the Old Vic company at the New Theatre. His other stage roles included the menacing character of Nat Goldberg in a 1975 revival of Harold Pinter's The Birthday Party, a role he'd already played in William Friedkin's 1968 film version alongside Robert Shaw and Patrick Magee. His last acting role was with his wife Joy in a 1979 tour of Barefoot in the Park.

On British television, he appeared alongside Sid James in Citizen James. His other television work included Angel Pavement, The Gentle Killers, The Infernal Machine, Focus, Dixon of Dock Green, Wodehouse Playhouse, and Hadleigh. He appeared in many films from 1947 to 1977, including The Lavender Hill Mob, The Sea Shall Not Have Them, and Alfie, frequently being directed by his brother-in-law Lewis Gilbert.

Tafler starred in several crime films for Anglo-Amalgamated such as Assassin for Hire.

He most commonly played spiv characters. One notable exception being the film Reach for the Sky (1956), in which he played the sympathetic prosthetics expert to Douglas Bader. There again, he appeared briefly in a dryly comic role as a uniformed policeman in the film The Cockleshell Heroes (also 1956). His film career ended with a featured role as the captain of the supertanker Liparus in the James Bond film The Spy Who Loved Me (1977).

== Selected filmography ==
=== Film ===
- Cottage to Let (1941) as RAF Officer (uncredited)
- The Little Ballerina (1947) as (uncredited)
- It Always Rains on Sunday (1947) as Morry Hyams
- Uneasy Terms (1948) as Maysin
- London Belongs to Me (1948) as Nightclub Receptionist
- No Room at the Inn (1948) as Stranger
- The Monkey's Paw (1948) as The Dealer
- Broken Journey (1948), uncredited, final scene.
- Passport to Pimlico (1949) as Fred Cowan
- Dance Hall (1950) as Manager
- Once a Sinner (1950) as Jimmy Smart
- Assassin for Hire (1951) as Antonio Riccardi
- Scarlet Thread (1951) as Marcon
- The Galloping Major (1951) as Mr. Leon
- The Lavender Hill Mob (1951) as Clayton
- Chelsea Story (1951) as Fletcher Gilchrist
- Hotel Sahara (1951) as Corporal Pullar
- Mystery Junction (1951) as Larry Gordon
- Blind Man's Bluff (1952) as Rick Martin
- Secret People (1952) as Syd Burnett
- Wide Boy (1952) as Benny
- Emergency Call (1952) as Brett
- Time Gentlemen, Please! (1952) as Joseph Spink
- Venetian Bird (1952) as Boldesca
- The Floating Dutchman (1952) as Victor Skinner
- There Was a Young Lady (1953) as Johnny
- Johnny on the Run (1953) as Harry
- The Square Ring (1953) as 1st Wiseacre
- The Saint's Return (1953) as Max Lennar
- Operation Diplomat (1953) as Wade
- The Crowded Day (1954) as Alex
- The Sea Shall Not Have Them (1954) as Cpl. Robb
- The Glass Cage (1955) as Rorke
- A Kid for Two Farthings (1955) as Madam Rita
- The Woman for Joe (1955) as Butch
- The Cockleshell Heroes (1955) as Policeman
- Dial 999 (1955) as Alf Cressett
- Guilty? as Camino
- The Long Arm (1956) as Stone
- Fire Maidens from Outer Space (1956) as Dr. Higgins
- Reach for the Sky (1956) as Robert Desoutter
- The Counterfeit Plan (1957) as Harry Flint
- Interpol (1957) as Curtis
- The Surgeon's Knife (1957) as Dr. Hearne
- Carve Her Name with Pride (1958) as Potter
- The Bank Raiders (1958) as Bernie Shelton
- Too Many Crooks (1959) as Solicitor
- The Crowning Touch (1959) as Joe
- Follow a Star (1959) as Pendlebury
- Tommy the Toreador (1959) as Ramon (uncredited)
- Sink the Bismarck! (1960) as First Workman
- Bottoms Up (1960) as Sid Biggs
- Let's Get Married (1960) as Pendle
- Light Up the Sky! (1960) as Ted Green
- Make Mine Mink (1960) as Lionel Spanager
- The Bulldog Breed (1960) as Speedboat Owner
- Five Golden Hours (1961) as Alfredo
- No Kidding (1961) as Mr. Rockbottom
- Carry On Regardless (1961) as Strip Club Manager
- A Weekend with Lulu (1961) as Stationmaster
- The 7th Dawn (1964) as Tom. Chief Petty Officer
- Promise Her Anything (1965) as Panel Participant
- Runaway Railway (1965) as Mr. Jones
- Alfie (1966) as Frank
- The Sandwich Man (1966) as First Fish Porter
- Berserk! (1967) as Harrison Liston
- The Birthday Party (1968) as Nat Goldberg
- The Adventurers (1970) as Col. Gutierrez
- The Spy Who Loved Me (1977) as Liparus captain

=== Television ===
- Sunday-Night Theatre (1950–1957, 8 episodes) as Harry Soames / George Ware / Professor Frey / Alexander Lopakhin / Chauvelin / Petronius Arbiter / Dorn / Chauvelin
- Back to Methuselah (1952, 2 episodes) as Ghost of Cain / Cain
- Your Favorite Story (1953, 1 episode)
- ITV Play of the Week (1955, 1 episode) as Nacky
- Theatre Royal (1955, 1 episode)
- Angel Pavement (1957–1958, 4 episodes) as Mr. Golspie
- Educated Evans (1957, 1 episode) as Morry Green
- The Gentle Killers (1957, 6 episodes)
- ITV Television Playhouse (1957–1960, 3 episodes) as Gregor / Charlie / Landrieu
- East End, West End (1958, 1 episode)
- Dick and the Duchess (1958, 2 episodes) as Giuseppe
- Theatre Night (1958, 1 episode) as Pedro Juarez
- Dial 999, ( including the 'Night Mail', and 'The Big Fish', episodes, plus one more)-(1958–1959, 3 episodes) as Pete / Smiler Harris / Mick Coletta
- Alfred Marks Time (1959, 1 episode)
- Playhouse 90 (1959, 1 episode) as Club Manager
- The Third Man (1959–1962, 2 episodes) as George Freeman / Colonel Abu Said
- Whack-O! (1959, 1 episode) as Harrison Jessel
- Glencannon (1959, 1 episode) as Mr. Daninds
- Citizen James (1960–1962, 31 episodes) as Charlie Davenport
- Boyd Q.C. (1960, 1 episode) as De Viani
- The Larkins (1960, 1 episode) as Sidney Foskett
- Knight Errant Limited (1960, 1 episode) as Angelo Broza
- Danger Man (1960, 1 episode) as Mikhail Radek
- A Christmas Night with the Stars (1960, 1 episode) as Charlie Davenport – with Sid James
- No Hiding Place (1961–1965, 3 episodes) as Marty Cook / Charlie Monkton / Lew Hemming
- The Arthur Askey Show (1961, 2 episodes) as Oscar Lamouche
- Three Live Wires (1961, 1 episode)
- Hamlet (1961, 5 episodes) as Claudius
- Here's Harry (1961, 1 episode)
- Deadline Midnight (1961, 1 episode) as Bluey Roxon
- Comedy Playhouse (1962, 1 episode) as Lionel
- Z-Cars (1963–1974, 5 episodes) as Ray Dawson / Willy Tyndale / Wasilewski / Ray Dawson / Oliver Snow
- A World of His Own (1964, 1 episode)
- Gideon's Way (1964, 1 episode) as Gabriel Lyon
- Dixon of Dock Green (1964–1969, 3 episodes) as Mr. Green / Peter Cassidy / Ralph Edwards
- Front Page Story (1965, 1 episode) as Waterman
- A Slight Case of... (1965, 1 episode)
- Theatre 625 (1966, 2 episodes) as Shamrayef / Finkelstein
- The Wednesday Play (1966–1970, 2 episodes) as Blaustein / Arthur Bradshaw
- Sam and Janet (1967, 1 episode) as Mr. Spalding
- The World of Wooster (1967, 1 episode) as Jas. Waterbury
- Man in a Suitcase (1968, 1 episode) as Reynolds
- The Ugliest Girl in Town (1968, 1 episode) as Bert Pooley
- Me Mammy (1969, 1 episode) as Sir Gerald Bronstein
- Hadleigh (1969, 1 episode) as Zinneman
- Coronation Street (1969, 2 episodes) as Mr. Maddox-Smith
- W. Somerset Maugham (1970, 1 episode) as Sir Adolphus Bland
- Misleading Cases (1971, 1 episode) as Mr. Benkle
- Alexander the Greatest (1971–1972, 13 episodes) as Joe Green
- The Adventurer (1973, 1 episode) as Wyvern
- Love Story (1973, 1 episode) as Mr. Miller
- Van der Valk (1973, 3 episodes) as Halsbeek
- Some Mothers Do 'Ave 'Em (1973, 1 episode) as Lockwood
- Play for Today (1973–1977, 2 episodes) as Harry Perlman / Mr. Crowley
- Vienna 1900 (1974, 1 episode) as Herr Klingemann
- Marked Personal (1974, 1 episode) as Cartwright
- Village Hall (1974, 1 episode) as Arthur Bolton
- Churchill's People (1975, 1 episode) as Haskelot
- Crown Court (1975, 1 episode) as Harry Simons
- The Sweeney (1975, 1 episode) as Manny Bellow
- Wodehouse Playhouse (1975–1976, 2 episodes) as Isadore Q. Fishbein
- Yes, Honestly (1976, 1 episode) as Harry Burton
- Survivors (1976, 2 episodes) as Manny
- Victorian Scandals (1976, 1 episode) as Achille Fould
- Thriller (1976, 1 episode) as Sam Meadows
- Do You Remember? (1978, 1 episode) as Ambrose Solto
- Devenish (1978, 1 episode) as Sidney Bloom
- Potter (1979, 1 episode) as Harry Tooms
- Cannon and Ball (1979, 1 episode) as The Agent
- BBC2 Playhouse (1980, 1 episode) as Kugelmann
- The Enigma Files (1980, 1 episode) as Solly King (final appearance)
