= Glyn Houston =

Welsh actor (1925–2019)

- Born: Glyndwr Desmond Houston; 23 October 1925; Clydach Vale, Wales
- Died: 30 June 2019 (aged 93)
- Occupation: Actor
- Years active: 1949–1996
- Spouse: Shirley Lawrence (m. 1956)
- Children: 2
- Family: Donald Houston (brother)

Glyndwr Desmond Houston (23 October 1925 – 30 June 2019) was a Welsh actor, best known for his television work.

== Early life ==
Houston was born in Clydach Vale, near Tonypandy, Wales. He was the younger brother of film actor Donald Houston. He served in the British Army during the Second World War, and was briefly a stand-up comedian performing for soldiers during the war. He made his first film appearance in The Blue Lamp in 1950. In 1951 he appeared at the Duchess Theatre in London's West End in the comedy play The Happy Family by Michael Clayton Hutton.

== Career ==
In the 1970s Houston played Lord Peter Wimsey's valet Bunter opposite Ian Carmichael in television adaptations of several of Dorothy Sayers tales. His performance was praised in The New York Times. Later, he had a role as a literary agent in the 1980s ITV sitcom Keep It in the Family. He appeared in a number of films including The Great Game.

Other credits included 'Peter Ridgway' in 'Colonel March of Scotland Yard' Episode 'The Stolen Crime' (1956), My Good Woman (1973–1974), A Horseman Riding By (1978), Inspector Morse, It Ain't Half Hot Mum, Minder and Doomwatch, as well as the recurring character "Det Supt Jones" in Softly, Softly. He also appeared twice as different characters in Doctor Who — as "Professor Owen Watson" in The Hand of Fear (1976) and as "Colonel Ben Wolsey" in The Awakening (1984). He also played Brother Cadfael in a 1979 BBC Radio 4 adaptation of One Corpse Too Many. Houston had over two hundred television and film credits, dating back as early as 1950. Houston won a BAFTA Cymru special award in April 2008.

A highlight of Houston's career was his appearance at the concert to celebrate the opening of the National Assembly for Wales in 1999 along with other actors such as Ioan Gruffudd and Harry Secombe.

== Personal life ==
Houston was married to the actress and model Shirley Lawrence and had two children. In May 2000 he unveiled a Mining Memorial in his native Rhondda at the Rhondda Heritage Park. He led the tributes to the thousands of miners who died and suffered during 150 years of mining in the South Wales coalfield. He released an autobiography titled Glyn Houston, A Black and White Actor in December 2009. Houston died at the age of 93 on 30 June 2019.

== Selected filmography ==
- The Blue Lamp (1950) - Barrow Boy (uncredited)
- Waterfront (1950) - Sailor (uncredited)
- Trio (1950) - Ted (segment "The Verger")
- The Clouded Yellow (1950) - Lancastrian Bus Conductor (uncredited)
- Home to Danger (1951) - Minor Role (uncredited)
- High Treason (1951) - Railway Shunter (uncredited)
- I Believe in You (1952) - Passerby (uncredited)
- Wide Boy (1952) - George
- The Gift Horse (1952) - Assistant Engineer (uncredited)
- Girdle of Gold (1952) - Dai Thomas
- The Great Game (1953) - Ned Rutter
- The Cruel Sea (1953) - Phillips
- Turn the Key Softly (1953) - Bob
- Stryker of the Yard (1953)
- Hell Below Zero (1954) - Borg
- River Beat (1954) - Charlie Williamson
- The Rainbow Jacket (1954) - (uncredited)
- The Sleeping Tiger (1954) - Bailey
- Betrayed (1954) - Paratrooper Corporal (uncredited)
- The Sea Shall Not Have Them (1954) - Knox
- The Happiness of Three Women (1954) - Morgan
- Passage Home (1955) - Charley Boy
- Lost (1956) - Bus Driver (uncredited)
- Private's Progress (1956) - Corporal on Sick Call (uncredited)
- Who Done It? (1956) - Arresting Policeman (uncredited)
- The Long Arm (1956) - Detective-Sergeant in 'Q' car
- High Flight (1957) - Controller Leuchars
- The Birthday Present (1957) - Police Officer in Court (uncredited)
- The One That Got Away (1957) - Harry 'Hurricane' (uncredited)
- A Night to Remember (1958) - Stoker (uncredited)
- A Cry from the Streets (1958) - Police Sergeant (uncredited)
- Nowhere to Go (1958) - Box Office Clerk (uncredited)
- Tiger Bay (1959) - Detective at Police Station (uncredited)
- Breakout (1959) - Man in pub (uncredited)
- Jet Storm (1959) - Michaels
- Four Desperate Men (1959) (aka Siege of Pinchgut) - Navy Rating (uncredited)
- Follow a Star (1959) - Fred (Steam Cleaner) (uncredited)
- Sink the Bismarck! (1960) - Seaman on 'Prince of Wales' (uncredited)
- The Battle of the Sexes (1960) - 2nd Porter
- Circus of Horrors (1960) - Carnival Barker (uncredited)
- There Was a Crooked Man (1960) - Smoking Machinist
- The Bulldog Breed (1960) - Gym Instructor (uncredited)
- How Green Was My Valley (1960, TV series) - Davy Morgan
- Mill of Secrets (1960, TV series) - Douglas Wallace
- Deadline Midnight (1961, TV series) - Mike Grieves
- Payroll (1961) - Frank Moore
- The Wind of Change (1961) - Det. Sgt. Parker
- The Green Helmet (1961) - Pit Manager
- Flame in the Streets (1961) - Hugh Davies
- Emergency (1962) - Inspector Harris
- Mix Me a Person (1962) - Sam
- Solo for Sparrow (1962) - Inspector Sparrow
- A Stitch in Time (1963) - Cpl. Welsh, St. John's Ambulance Brigade
- Panic (1963) - Mike
- One Way Pendulum (1965) - Detective Inspector Barnes
- The Secret of Blood Island (1965) - Berry
- The Brigand of Kandahar (1965) - Marriott
- Invasion (1965) - Police Sergeant Draycott
- Gideon's Way Episode: 'Fall High, Fall Hard' (TV series 1965) - Det. Sgt. Carmichael (his actor brother Donald Houston also appeared in the episode)
- Headline Hunters (1968) - Gresham
- Love Thy Neighbour (1975) Episode 'The Opinion Poll' - Rev. Llewelyn-Owen
- Are You Being Served? (1977) - Cesar Rodriguez
- A Horseman Riding By (1978, TV Series) - John Rudd
- Breakaway: A Family Affair (1980) - Chief Superintendent Bert Sinclair (six episodes)
- The Sea Wolves (1980) - Peters
- If You Go Down in the Woods Today (1981) - Ticket Collector
- Conspiracy (1989) - William Brain
- Old Scores (1991) - Aneurin Morgan
- The Mystery of Edwin Drood (1993) - Grewgious
