= Five Golden Hours =

1961 film by Mario Zampi

- Theatrical release poster
- Directed by: Mario Zampi
- Written by: Hans Wilhelm
- Produced by: Giulio Zampi; Mario Zampi
- Starring: Ernie Kovacs; Cyd Charisse; George Sanders
- Cinematography: Christopher Challis
- Edited by: Bill Lewthwaite
- Music by: Stanley Black
- Production companies: Anglofilm; Avers Films; Cinematografica Internazionale
- Distributed by: Columbia Pictures
- Release dates: 10 March 1961 (Italy); February 1961 (U.S.)
- Running time: 90 minutes
- Countries: Italy; United Kingdom
- Languages: English; Italian

Five Golden Hours (also known as Cinque Ore in Contanti) is a 1961 Italian-British comedy film directed by Mario Zampi and starring Ernie Kovacs, Cyd Charisse, George Sanders, Dennis Price and John Le Mesurier. It was written by Hans Wilhelm. In October 1961, the film played on a double bill in some areas of the US with the William Castle horror movie Mr. Sardonicus (1961).

== Plot ==
Aldo Bondi is a professional pallbearer and mourner in Rome who lives well off the extravagant gifts given to him by the rich widows he comforts. When he falls for the supposedly penniless Baroness Sandra – who is actually a rich "black widow" whose husbands all die – he concocts a Ponzi scheme to cheat three widows by taking money from them, telling them that he will invest it during the "five golden hours" between the closing of the stock exchange in Rome, and the opening of the New York Stock Exchange. However, the Baroness absconds with the cash, leaving Bondi in hock to the widows. He attempts to kill them, but the scheme fails and he pretends to have gone insane. In the sanatarium, his roommate is another debtor feigning madness, Mr. Bing.

One of the three widows dies, leaving Bondi a fortune, which he can only have if he continues to be insane, otherwise the inheritance is to go to a monastery – so Bondi makes a deal with the brothers to split the money. He returns to Rome, where Mr. Bing makes contact with Baroness Sandra and, for a fee, tells her that Bondi is now rich. Sandra and Bondi get married, and soon he is her seventh dead husband.

== Cast ==
- Ernie Kovacs as Aldo Bondi
- Cyd Charisse as Baroness Sandra
- George Sanders as Mr. Bing
- Kay Hammond as Martha
- Dennis Price as Raphael
- Clelia Matania as Rosalia
- John Le Mesurier as Doctor Alfieri
- Finlay Currie as Father Superior
- Reginald Beckwith as Brother Geronimo
- Avice Landone as Beatrice
- Sydney Tafler as Alfredo
- Martin Benson as Enrico
- Bruno Barnabe as Cesare
- Ron Moody as Gabrielle
- Leonard Sachs as Mr. Morini
- Marianne Stone as Tina
- Gordon Phillott as old monk
- Georgina Cookson as lady passenger
- Hy Hazell as lady guest
- Joy Shelton as lady guest

== Production ==
Five Golden Hours was filmed in two versions, one for English-language release, and another, released as Cinque ore in contanti, for Italian consumption. In the Italian version, some of the smaller roles were taken by Italian actors. Location shooting for the film took place in Bolzano, Italy and the surrounding area.

Kovacs cited the picture as his favorite among his own films.

The film was the last directed by Mario Zampi.

== Reception ==
The Monthly Film Bulletin wrote: "A lethargic, tasteless farce masquerading as comédie noire. The aimless script is seldom funny, Mario Zampi's direction is lifeless, and the distinguished cast (apart from the welcome re-appearance of Kay Hammond as the dithering Martha) is wasted."

Variety wrote that "too much onus is flung on the shoulders of Ernie Kovacs, a talented comedian, but one who is more acceptable in smaller doses."

The New York Times' Howard Thompson said that "Alec Guinness and a subtle director could have turned (the film) into gold," but "hammered brass is what we get, unfortunately." He was critical of the two American stars, saying that Kovacs was "sniggering self-consciousness" while Charisse was "merely wooden."

The Sunday Times called it "a wicked, happy little surprise," "an excellent black joke of a sort rare in the British cinema" and that "most importantly, it has Ernie Kovacs, a player whose comic vitality hasn't been staled."

== Novelization ==
In anticipation of the film's release, Digit Books of London (the paperback imprint of Brown, Watson Limited) published a novelization of the screenplay. While the cover and title page say "Adapted from the screenplay by Hans Wilhelm," the novelist is not credited.
