= Glynis McNicoll =

New Zealand actress

- Born: New Zealand
- Occupation: Actress

Glynis McNicoll is a New Zealand actress. She is featured in the role of Elizabeth Reynolds on Section 7, Aunt Noeline in Under the Mountain, Greta Lomax in Radio Waves and Margot Warner on Shortland Street. She won the 1981 Feltex Television Award for best actress for her role of Joan Pender in an episode of Mortimer's Patch.

McNicoll moved from England to New Zealand around 1957 and took on acting on radio before moving onto TV in commercials, panel games and televised plays.
