= Murder Story =

1989 Australian television film

- Newspaper ad 19 May 1958
- Genre: thriller
- Based on: play by Ludovic Kennedy
- Written by: Alan Seymour
- Directed by: Raymond Menmuir
- Country of origin: Australia
- Original language: English

Production
- Running time: 60 mins
- Production company: ABC

Original release
- Network: ABC
- Release: 21 May 1958 (Sydney)
- Release: 15 July 1958 (Melbourne)

Murder Story is a 1958 Australian television play.

It was based on a script by Ludovic Kennedy based on the Croydon roof top murder and starred Neva Carr-Glynn, John Ewart and Douglas Kelly. It was directed by Raymond Menmuir.

== Plot ==
A 19-year-old, Jim Tanner is sentenced to death for the murder of Constable Albert Tomkins. In prison, Tanner is taught to read and write. But he is executed.

== Cast ==
- John Ewart as Jim Tanner
- Neva Carr Glyn as his mother
- Douglas Kelly as his father
- John Alden as prison chaplain
- Don Crosby as Warder Graves
- Deryck Barnes as Warder Barty
- Myrna Dodd as Cons Tomkins Widow
- Richard Meikle as Ted Clift, Jim's accomplice
- Frederick Powell as inspector

== Production ==
Kennedy's play had been performed for British TV in 1958 as an episode of Armchair Theatre. The show was filmed live at ABC's Sydney studios at Gore Hill.

== Reception ==
According to The Age after the show screened in Melbourne "viewers and ABV-2 staff were visibly upset by the realism created" and "ABV-2 hostess Corinne Kerby was too upset to introduce the succeeding feature."

The production was well received critically, the Woman's Weekly reviewer saying "Murder Story" and its actors engrossed—indeed hypnotised—me." The show was repeated in January 1960 - when announcing this The Sydney Morning Herald said the production "was regarded as one of the ABC's best TV productions."

There was a production of Kennedy's original play put on at the Independent Theatre in Sydney shortly after the TV play aired.

Raymond Menuir, John Edwart and Alan Seymour worked together again on Bodgie (1959).

== See also ==
- List of live television plays broadcast on Australian Broadcasting Corporation (1950s)
