= Mystery Junction =

1951 film by Michael McCarthy

- Directed by: Michael McCarthy
- Written by: Michael McCarthy
- Produced by: William H. Williams
- Starring: Sydney Tafler; Barbara Murray; Patricia Owens
- Cinematography: Robert LaPresle
- Edited by: Geoffrey Muller
- Music by: Hubert Clifford
- Color process: Black and white
- Production company: Merton Park Studios
- Distributed by: Anglo-Amalgamated Film Distributors
- Release date: September 1951 (United Kingdom)
- Running time: 65 minutes
- Country: United Kingdom
- Language: English

Mystery Junction is a 1951 British second feature ('B') mystery crime film directed and written by Michael McCarthy and starring Sydney Tafler, Barbara Murray and Patricia Owens. The screenplay concerns a writer who narrates a crime story for a fellow passenger on a train journey.

== Plot ==
A middle-aged woman, Miss Owens, recognises her fellow train passenger, mystery writer Larry Gordon, from a photograph on the cover of one of his books she is reading. Telling him she is a big fan of his books, she asks him how he gets his ideas for his stories, so he agrees to tell her.....

Suddenly they hear a scream. They discover that a train door has been opened and snow blown in. Gordon and Miss Owens visit all the passengers in the railway carriage. One of them is Steve Harding, handcuffed to police officer Peterson, who has a gun. Harding is to appear in court the next day, charged with the murder of a young woman. The other passengers are a broker, an engineer, a woman and a young man. All of them, in one way or another, are linked with Harding.

They then discover that the train guard has been assaulted and knocked out by an assailant who took his uniform coat and posed as him. Two female stowaways, actresses out of work and short of money, are found hiding in the guard's van.

With another police officer who was also escorting Harding now missing, it is concluded that the scream they heard likely came from him when he was thrown from the train by an accomplice of Harding's.

All these passengers leave the train at a junction station to join a connecting service, but they find that train has been cancelled because of the snowy conditions. Taking shelter in the station waiting room, the lighting fails and in the darkness officer Peterson is shot and killed, enabling Harding to be released by accomplices and they attempt to make an escape through the snowy darkness, but conditions force them to return. Knowing that the train had been cancelled, other police arrive to provide support to officer Peterson, and the involvement of the other passengers is revealed. A confrontation leads to the shooting of Harding and also the killer of Peterson, who had accidentally shot him in the darkness when trying to shoot Harding.

The scene fades back to Gordon ending his story idea to Miss Owens.

== Cast ==
- Sydney Tafler as Larry Gordon
- Barbara Murray as Pat Dawn
- Patricia Owens as Mabel Dawn
- Ewen Solon as Sergeant Peterson
- Martin Benson as Steve Harding
- Christine Silver as Miss Owens
- Cyril Smith as Station Master
- Philip Dale as Elliot Foster
- Pearl Cameron as Helen Mason
- John Salew as John Martin
- Denis Webb as Inspector Clarke
- David Davies as Bert Benson
- Charles Irwin as Edward Hooker

== Production ==
Filming took place at Merton Park in April 1951.

== Reception ==
The Monthly Film Bulletin wrote: "'The plot, though confused, is quite a good one, but it has not been worked out to the best advantage. The driving snow and the rattle of the trains suggest an atmosphere of mystery, and there are moments of tension, yet the film lacks plausibility and pace. The characters – the impassive inspector with nerves of steel, the naively enthusiastic Miss Owens, the spiv gangster wearing a florid tie and fawned on by his cowardly, double-crossing accomplice – are familiar but inauthentic types."

Kine Weekly wrote: "Tabloid comedy crime melodrama. ... Reasonably well-acted and staged with ingenious economy, it's artless "who-dunnit" carries quite a number of laughs and thrills."

Picturegoer wrote: "Provided it is reasonably well written, acted and directed, a "whodunit" can usually be depended upon to pass a hectic hour. This specimen, despite its modest presentation, is no exception to the rule."

In British Sound Films: The Studio Years 1928–1959 David Quinlan rated the film as "mediocre", writing: "'Novel' thriller doesn't need credibility, but lacks pace too."
