= Ewen Solon =

New Zealand-born actor (1917–1985)

- Solon as Lucas in Maigret (1960-1963)
- Born: Peter Ewen Solon; 7 September 1917; Auckland, New Zealand
- Died: 7 July 1985 (aged 67); Addlestone, Surrey, England
- Occupation: Actor

Peter Ewen Solon (7 September 1917 – 7 July 1985) was a New Zealand-born actor, who worked extensively in both the United Kingdom and Australia.

At the outbreak of World War II, Solon became a member of the First Echelon, 2nd NZEF that saw service in the Middle East. Later appointed as a commissioned officer, he married Frances Gwendolyne Hughes, a New Zealander; also serving in Egypt during the War.

After training as a primary school teacher he travelled overseas to pursue an acting career. Film credits include: Rob Roy, the Highland Rogue, The Dam Busters, Murder Anonymous 1955 (part of the Scotland Yard film series), The Hound of the Baskervilles, The Terror of the Tongs, The Curse of the Werewolf, The Message, Unidentified Flying Oddball and The Wicked Lady.

On television, he was a series regular on Maigret; playing Sergeant Lucas, the eponymous commissaire's right-hand man, in 50 of the series' 52 episodes. Early in the filming, he broke his leg in a stunt while jumping from a wall. Subsequent scripts for the BBC TV series had to be rewritten to account for the obvious damage which could not be hidden or shot around.

His other appearances include: The Four Just Men, A Mask for Alexis, Man of the World, Danger Man, Dixon of Dock Green, Doctor Who (in the serials The Savages and Planet of Evil), The Troubleshooters, Redcap, The Revenue Men, Bellbird, Virgin of the Secret Service, Journey to the Unknown, Matlock Police, Spyforce, Division 4 and Into the Labyrinth.

Solon married a second time in 1965, to an English actress, Vicki Woolf.

== Selected filmography ==
- London Belongs to Me (1948) - Clerk (uncredited)
- The Naked Heart (1950)
- The Clouded Yellow (1950) - Coniston police sergeant (uncredited)
- Highly Dangerous (1950) - Enemy scientist (uncredited)
- The Rossiter Case (1951) - Inspector
- The Dark Man (1951) - Police driver
- Assassin for Hire (1951) - Fred
- Mystery Junction (1951) - Detective Sgt. Peterson
- Valley of Eagles (1951) - Det. Anderson
- The Card (1952) - Bookstall attendant at Llandudno (uncredited)
- The Story of Robin Hood and His Merrie Men (1952) - Merrie man
- Hunted (1952) - Radio operator
- Crow Hollow (1952) - Sgt. Jenkins
- Ghost Ship (1952) - Plain clothes man
- The Sword and the Rose (1953) - Guardsman
- Rob Roy, the Highland Rogue (1953) - Maj. Gen. Wightman
- The End of the Road (1954 film) (1954) - Policeman
- As Long as They're Happy (1955) - Reporter (uncredited)
- The Dark Avenger (1955) - D'Estell
- The Dam Busters (1955) - Flight Sergeant G. E. Powell
- Lost (1956) - Bus inspector (uncredited)
- Jumping for Joy (1956) - Haines
- 1984 (1956) - Outer Party orator
- Who Done It? (1956) - Police radio announcer (uncredited)
- Behind the Headlines (1956) - Superintendent Faro
- There's Always a Thursday (1957) - Inspector Bradley
- Yangtse Incident: The Story of H.M.S. Amethyst (1957) - ERA Williams RN
- Account Rendered (1957) - Detective Inspector Marshall
- The Story of Esther Costello (1957) - Christine Brown's father (uncredited)
- The Long Haul (1957) - Minor role
- Robbery Under Arms (1957) - Sergeant Arthur
- The Mark of the Hawk (1957) - Inspector
- The Devil's Pass (1957) - Job Jolly
- The Silent Enemy (1958) - Willowdale captain
- The Big Money (1958) - Detective in Pub (uncredited)
- The Hound of the Baskervilles (1959) - Stapleton
- Jack the Ripper (1959) - Sir David Rogers
- The Stranglers of Bombay (1959) - Camel vendor (uncredited)
- Tarzan the Magnificent (1960) - Dexter
- The Sundowners (1960) - Halstead
- The Terror of the Tongs (1961) - Tang How - Tong leader's aide
- The Curse of the Werewolf (1961) - Don Fernando
- Mystery Submarine (1963) - Lt. Cmdr. Kirklees
- The Sandwich Man (1966) - Blind man
- Infamous Conduct (1966) - Dixon
- Section 7 (1972) - Hugh Lacking
- Moving On (1974) - George Collier
- The Message (1977) - Yasser
- Unidentified Flying Oddball (1979) - Watkins
- A Nightingale Sang in Berkeley Square (1979) - Commander Ford
- Lion of the Desert (1980)
- The Wicked Lady (1983) - Clergyman at Tyburn
- Nutcracker (1983) - Monsieur Demaurault (final film role)
