= John Gough (composer) =

- Hubert Clifford, Sir Henry Wood and John Gough inspecting the ruins of the Queen's Hall, London, shortly after its destruction by German bombing on 10 May 1941
- Born: John Jeffrey Gough; 1903 23 June 1903; Launceston, Tasmania, Australia
- Died: 7 November 1951 (aged 48); London, England
- Occupations: Composer, radio producer, radio playwright
- Notable work: The Wallaby Track

John Jeffrey Gough (23 June 1903 – 7 November 1951) was an Australian-born composer, radio producer and radio playwright who relocated to the United Kingdom and worked for the BBC.

Gough was the only son of John T. Gough and his wife, Hilda May Atkins Gough, of Launceston, Tasmania. He was educated at Charles St School and Launceston High School. He was a talented swimmer, diver and oarsman, and taught himself to play the cello. He worked for two years as a cadet reporter for The Daily Telegraph, Launceston. At the age of 19, he won a three-year scholarship to the Melbourne Conservatorium of Music. He was awarded the Bronze Medal of the Trinity Society of Music. He was solo cellist with and deputy conductor of the orchestra of the Capitol Theatre, Melbourne. He toured with theatrical orchestras, playing for some time in Sydney. He left Australia to continue his studies in Paris, where he supported himself by playing small parts in films made by Gaumont Studios. He won a scholarship for composition at the Royal College of Music, where he studied under Ralph Vaughan Williams. His income was meagre, and he suffered "privations that have often included starving".

He joined the BBC in London as "tone and control officer", and was subsequently appointed musical director and later features producer. He relocated to Scotland; where he was known for wearing a kilt, and a beard, and using the leg of a hare as a cigarette holder. He seems to have returned to London no later than 1941: a photograph exists of Gough with his fellow-countryman the conductor and composer Hubert Clifford and the British conductor Sir Henry Wood inspecting the ruins of the Queen's Hall, London soon after it had been destroyed by German bombing on 10 May 1941. During World War II and afterwards, he worked for the BBC Pacific Service, becoming BBC Pacific Programme Organiser. He died in 1951, and was survived by a wife and five children.

He wrote several plays for radio, mostly in the 1930s and on historical topics, which were broadcast by the BBC Home Service, Scotland.

On 4 April 1929, his symphonic poem The Wallaby Track was premiered at the Bournemouth Music Festival. On 5 July 1943, it was played at the Royal Albert Hall in a Proms concert broadcast by the BBC. It may have been that piece which was broadcast nine days later by the BBC-ABC radio relay Calling Australia. His other compositions included settings for voice and piano of the poem "Song of the Rain" by his fellow Australian Hugh McCrae and of the poem "Beauty's Beauty" by the 17th century English dramatist John Ford; Love Song for Strings in the Form of a Rondo (commented on favourably by John Ireland in 1943); and Serenade for Small Orchestra (1931; recorded in 1999 by Vernon Handley and the BBC Philharmonic Orchestra, Chandos 9757).
