= Bodgie (film) =

- Based on: Wide Boy by Rex Rienits
- Written by: Alan Seymour
- Directed by: Raymond Menmuir
- Country of origin: Australia
- Original language: English

Production
- Running time: 60 mins
- Production company: ABC

Original release
- Network: ABN-2
- Release: 12 August 1959 (Sydney live)
- Network: ABV-2
- Release: 2 September 1959 (Melbourne)

Bodgie is an Australian television movie, or rather a live television play with filmed sequences, which aired on ABC during 1959. Originally broadcast on 12 August 1959 in Sydney on ABN-2, a kinescope recording was made of the program and shown in Melbourne on ABV-2 on 2 September 1959.

At the time, most live plays broadcast on Australian television were simply performances of overseas plays. Bodgie was based on a British story written by an Australian, Rex Rientis, which was adapted to be relocated to Australia by another Australian writer, Alan Seymour.

It is not known if the kinescope recording of the broadcast is still extant or not.

== Plot ==
Kenny is a "bodgie" who lives in Kings Cross with his ex-convict father (Douglas Kelly). Kenny has a girlfriend (Lola Brooks) and is forced into blackmail of a politician (Nigel Lovell). He tries to protect a woman (Thelma Scott) and murder results.

== Cast ==
Ad for Bodgie from the Sydney Morning Herald, 8 Aug 1959.

- John Ewart as Kenney
- Don Crosby as Police Inspector
- Lola Brooks
- Douglas Kelly as Kenney's father
- Nellie Lamport
- Nigel Lovell
- Thelma Scott
- Louis Wishart

== Production ==
The story was originally written by Rex Rienits and previously filmed in Britain as the film Wide Boy (1952). Rienits also adapted this story as a radio play and as a novel. Rienits' script was adapted for Australian TV by Alan Seymour, who relocated it to Australia.

It starred John Ewart and was produced by Ray Menmuir, who had previously collaborated for the ABC in Murder Story.

While mainly a live drama, it also featured exterior scenes shot in King's Cross, Darlinghurst and North Sydney. A number of police worked as extras; Ray Menmuir had to get permission for this to be done.

== Reception ==
The critic for the Sydney Morning Herald wrote that:

The thoroughly professional qualities of Rex Rienits' writing in his play Bodgie were fairly satisfactorily matched in production and acting... Mr Rienits has said very little that is new in his neatly tailored but conventional plot about the eroding effects of crime and its spurious glamour on a weak character, or about the relative moral positions of the blackmailer and his victims - around whom the play revolves. But then his aim, justifiably, is not sociological comment but entertainment. Not that social comment was entirely missing. John Ewart as the "bodgie" at least showed how the mind of a lay about turned involuntary murdered, works, although the part gave him little opportunity to reveal why it gets that way. This was a well-observed performance in which Ewart gave a convincing air to the egg-shell thin toughness covering a profound insecurity, and the desperate hysterical bravado used as a cloak for cowardice. This may not have been the picture of a typical "bodgie" but it was a good portrait of a scared, lonely, weak - and as a result of this, criminal - young man. With its use of filmed Sydney backgrounds, and some carefully designed studio sets, Ray Menmuir's production added some refreshing authenticity to the tensions generated by the author's clever writing and Alan Seymour's adaptation... support cast acted adequately, but without much imagination.

Valda Marshall, the TV critic from the Sun Herald called it "a neat and imaginative little drama of the more seamy side of King's Cross life" with "sympathetic acting from" Ewart, Kelly and Brooks but "not quite so convincing in secondary roles were " Lovell and Scott. She felt the play "suffered slightly from rather obvious differences in quality between the prefilmed exterior scenes and those done live from the studio. But all in all it was a worthwhile effort."

== See also ==
- Autumn Affair
- Emergency
- Shell Presents
- The Passionate Pianist
- Blue Murder
- List of live television plays broadcast on Australian Broadcasting Corporation (1950s)
