= Section 7 (TV series) =

- Written by: Hamish Keith; David Ballantyne; Fiona Kidman; Rebecca Cameron; Michael Noonan
- Starring: Ewen Solon; Ian Mune; Glynis McNicoll
- Country of origin: New Zealand
- Original language: English
- No. of seasons: 1
- No. of episodes: 11

Production
- Producers: Don Hope Evans; Tony Issac; David Stevens; David Istance
- Running time: 26 minutes

Original release
- Release: February 14 – May 24, 1972

Section 7 is a 1972 New Zealand television series focused on the Probation Service office. It starred Ewen Solon, Ian Mune and Glynis McNicoll.

The Press said of the first episode "It was Interesting more than gripping, for the story was not a strong one. But as a scene-setter. it was a success, and one could not reasonably expect much depth to it in its first week." They later noted of the episodes "There have been a couple of good ones, but by and large "Section 7" has been a very limited success." After the final episode The Press said "Much of the writing for "Section 7" was not good enough to carry out the design, so that sometimes the sub-plots were too numerous, the plays too jerky."

== Cast ==
- Ewen Solon as Hugh Lacking
- Ian Mune as John Sitwell
- Glynis McNicoll as Elizabeth Reynolds
- Yvonne Lawley as Miss Jennings
- Ross Skiffington as Roger Scott
- Lawrence Hepworth
