= Assassin for Hire =

1951 British film by Michael McCarthy

- Directed by: Michael McCarthy
- Written by: Rex Rienits
- Based on: TV play by Rex Rienits
- Produced by: Julian Wintle
- Starring: Sydney Tafler; Ronald Howard; Katherine Blake; John Hewer
- Cinematography: Robert LaPresle
- Edited by: Eric Hodges
- Music by: Ronnie Emanuel
- Production company: Merton Park Studios
- Distributed by: Anglo-Amalgamated Film Distributors
- Release dates: 11 June 1951; (UK); January 1952 (US)
- Running time: 67 minutes
- Country: United Kingdom
- Language: English

Assassin for Hire is a 1951 British crime film directed by Michael McCarthy and starring Sydney Tafler, Ronald Howard and Katherine Blake. Its plot follows a contract killer who becomes stricken with remorse when he is led to believe he has murdered his brother.

It was the first feature film made by Anglo-Amalgamated. It was made at Merton Park Studios from a screenplay by Rex Rienits. It was intended as a supporting feature, although it may have been shown as a headline feature in some cinemas.

== Plot ==
Antonio Riccardi, a young British criminal of Italian heritage, works as a professional contract killer in order to pay for his gifted younger brother's violin lessons so that he can escape from a life of poverty and crime. A series of mistakes lead him to wrongly believe he has killed his brother, and he confesses his crimes to the police.

== Cast ==
- Sydney Tafler as Antonio Riccardi
- Ronald Howard as Detective Inspector Carson
- Katherine Blake as Maria Riccardi
- John Hewer as Giuseppe Riccardi
- June Rodney as Helen Garrett
- Gerald Case as Detective Sergeant Stott
- Reginald Dyson as Josef Meyerling
- Sam Kydd as Bert
- Ian Wallace as Charlie
- Martin Benson as Catesby
- Ewen Solon as Fred

== Original radio play ==
Rex Rienits originally wrote the story as a radio play, which aired in Australia in 1944 in a production starring Keith Eden. Another version was produced in 1952.

== Television play ==
Rienits moved to London in April 1949 and in May 1950 reported he had sold the script to television. It was one of two television scripts he sold, the other being The Million Pound Note which would be filmed in 1954. (Rienits reportedly also sold the radio play for Assassin for Hire to the BBC who bought it but never broadcast it.)

The television play Assassin for Hire was screened by the BBC in September 1950 with Sidney Tafler in the lead.

== Film production ==
In November 1950 Rienits reported that film rights to his story had been purchased by Anglo Amalgamated, run by Nat Cohen. Filming started at Merton Studios on 13 November 1950 with Tafler repeating his television performance. It was the first time Anglo produced a film.

Dallas Bower who directed the television version claims the movie "more or less started Nat Cohen off in the film industry because he decided he wanted to make this into a film and indeed he did" and "it made a mint of money." Bower thought Assassin for Hire might have been "the first occasion when a successful TV production also became a successful film."

== Film reception ==
Kinematograph Weekly wrote "The film is not too well staged, and the camera work lacks imagination, but Sydney Tafler contributes an arresting study and wins sympathy as Tony, and Ronald Howard is quietly competent as DetectiveInspector Carson. The good work of its costars not only emphasises its irony but heightens its clever twist ending. More ambitious thrillers have carried less kick."

The film was released in the US. The Daily News said it "isn't a bad picture, just mediocre".

Ian Wallace, who was in the cast, called the movie "a ‘B’ picture that enjoyed feature film success and eventually was shown on pretty well every TV network in the world - at no personal gain to the cast."

== Novel ==
Rienits later turned the story into a novel. It was published along with the Rienits short story Wide Boy which was later filmed with Sidney Tafler in 1952. The Herald called the novel Assassin for Hire "a tightly written, quite exciting report on a professional killer." The Advertiser called it "An exciting, if not a very convincing, novel.

== Stage play ==
Rienits adapted the story into a stage play. A production was mounted in London in April 1952 by the Repertory Players.

The Daily Telegraph praised the ending but felt it had been "insufficiently prepared".

== Bibliography ==
- Chibnall, Steve & McFarlane, Brian. The British 'B' Film. Palgrave MacMillan, 2009.
