= Edwin J. Fancey =

British film producer and distributor (1902–1980)

Edwin John Fancey (1902–1980) was a British film producer and distributor. He owned the production company E.J. Fancey Productions, and the distribution company DUK. He specialised largely in producing supporting films and short subjects, often edited from or compiled from material appearing in earlier films produced by others, such as musical numbers or comedy routines.

== Selected filmography ==
Producer

- The Balloon Goes Up (1942)
- Up with the Lark (1943)
- Soho Conspiracy (1950)
- Hangman's Wharf (1950)
- London Entertains (1951)
- Down Among the Z Men (1952)
- Potter of the Yard (1952)
- Behind the Headlines (1953)
- Forces' Sweetheart (1953)
- Flannelfoot (1953)
- Mr Beamish Goes South (1953)
- River of Destiny (1954)
- Calling All Cars (1954)
- Johnny on the Spot (1954)
- Action Stations (1956)
- Clear Heights (1956)
- Flight from Vienna (1956)
- They Never Learn (1956)
- Fighting Mad (1957)
- The Traitor (1957)
- Shoot to Kill (1960)
- Girls of the Latin Quarter (1960)

== Bibliography ==
- Chibnall, Steve & McFarlane, Brian. The British 'B' Film. Palgrave MacMillan, 2009.
