= Diana Chesney =

British-American character actress (1916–2004)

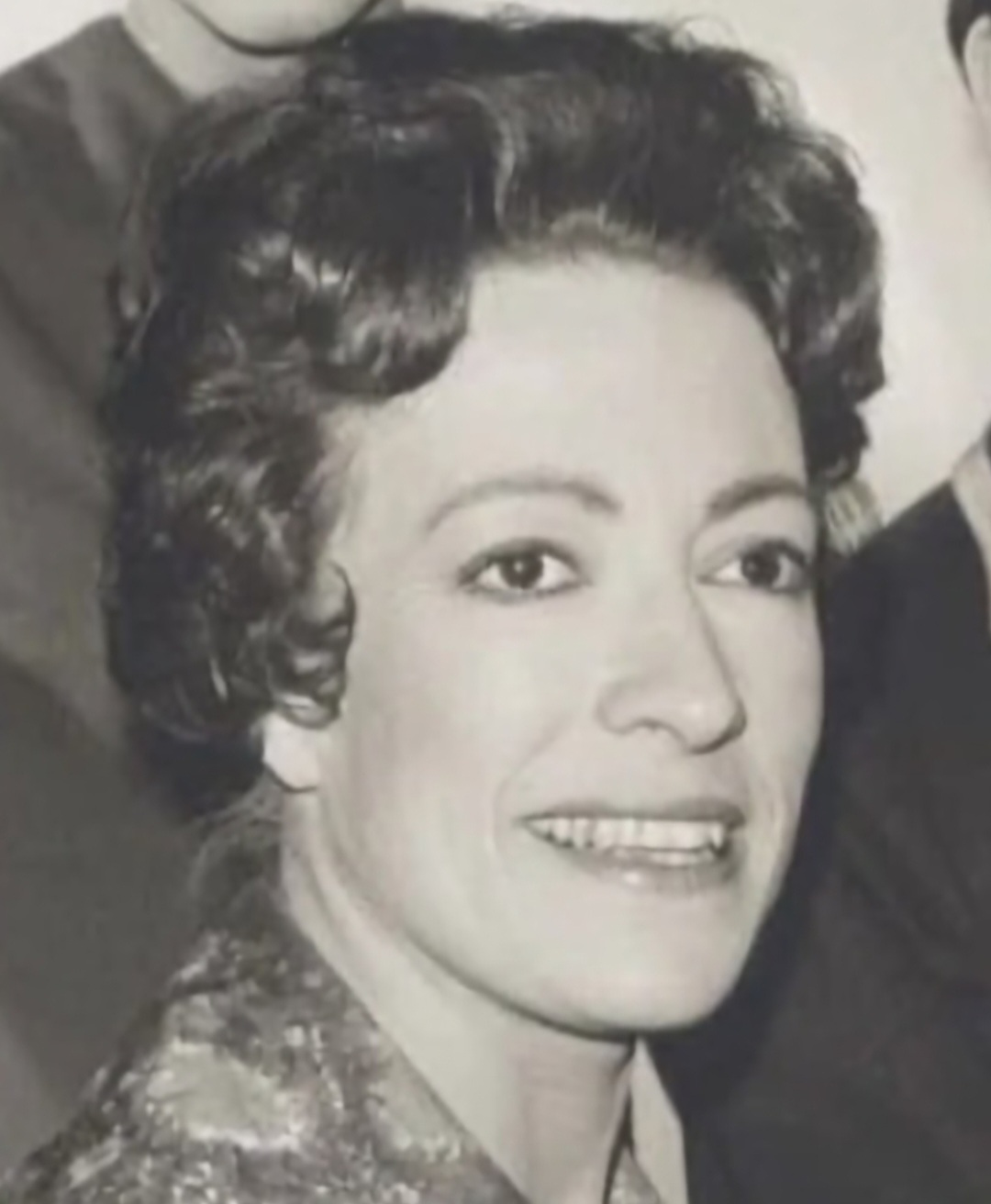
- Chesney in Fair Exchange, 1962
- Born: 17 November 1916; Mandalay, British Burma
- Died: 7 May 2004 (aged 87); Woodland Hills, California, U.S.
- Occupation: Actress
- Years active: 1940–1993

Diana Chesney (17 November 1916 – 7 May 2004) was a British-American character actress whose career spanned British cinema, American television, and stage productions over five decades. She is best known for playing Sybil Finch on the CBS sitcom Fair Exchange (1962–1963), and for voicing Mrs. Judson in Disney’s The Great Mouse Detective (1986).

== Early life ==
Chesney was born in Mandalay, British Burma, where her father served as a British Army major. She moved to England during childhood and began acting after attending the Royal Academy of Dramatic Art (RADA). She joined a touring musical comedy troupe during World War II and performed for Allied troops in Egypt, Iraq, and Libya. After surviving a Luftwaffe bombing of a train she was riding, she refused to travel by train again.

== Career ==
=== British stage and screen ===
Chesney began acting on the British stage in the 1940s, debuting in a touring production of Show Boat. Her British screen credits included over 40 television shows and films, including Saturday Night and Sunday Morning, In the Doghouse, Mark Saber, Gideon’s Way, and The King and I, where she appeared alongside Yul Brynner.

=== Move to the United States ===
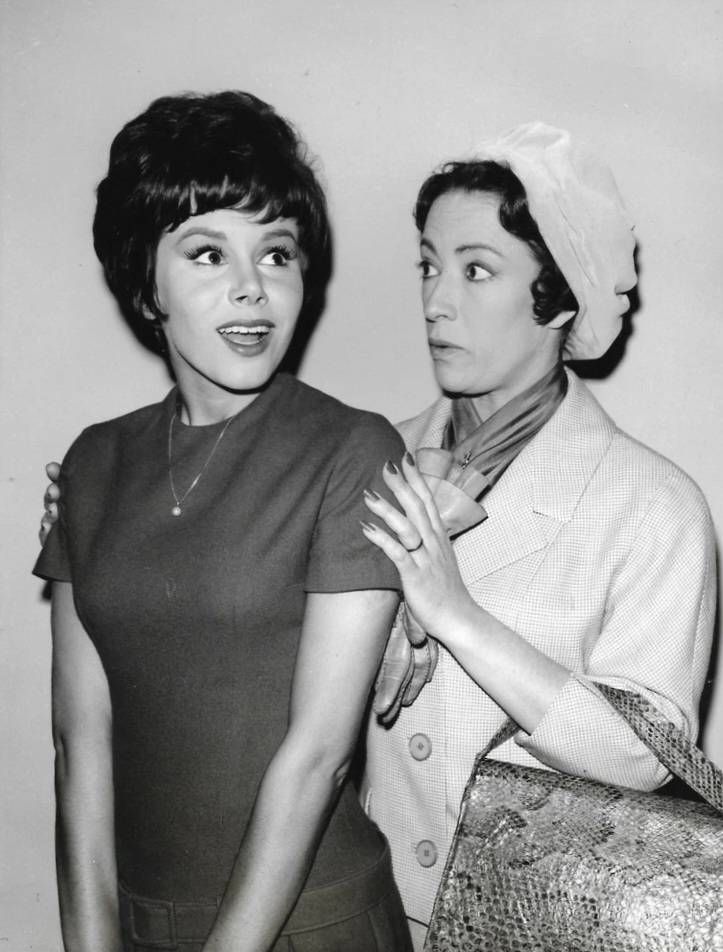
Judy Carne and Diana Chesney in Fair Exchange, 1962

In 1961, Chesney was cast in the CBS sitcom Fair Exchange, one of the first hour-long comedy series on U.S. television where she played Sybil Finch, the British mother in a family who swapped daughters with an American family. The show filmed in Los Angeles and aired for one season before being shortened and ultimately canceled. She once recounted that she was cast after an unexpected audition in London set up by actor Victor Maddern, her friend and co-star.

She also appearing twice Bewitched, first in 1965 as Aunt Hagatha and later 1971 ad Aunt Enchantra.

Chesney was often described as “supercharged with energy—witty, opinionated, talkative,” praising her insight into American and British cultural differences.

== Later life ==
Chesney settled in Malibu before relocating to Topanga Canyon in the early 1970s. A noted automobile enthusiast, she brought her vintage 1932 Rolls-Royce from England and later bought a Cadillac for daily use.

== Death ==
Diana Chesney died of cancer at age 87 on 7 May 2004, in Woodland Hills, Los Angeles, at the MPTF retirement home.

== Filmography ==
=== Film ===
| Year | Title | Role | Notes |
|---|---|---|---|
| 1948 | Love in Waiting | Gladys | |
| 1950 | Soho Conspiracy | Rosa | |
| 1956 | They Never Learn | Inspector | |
| 1957 | Son of a Stranger | Mrs. Peck | |
| 1957 | All at Sea (aka Barnacle Bill) | Mrs. Figg | |
| 1957 | Rock You Sinners | Actress | |
| 1957 | It Could Be You | Actress | |
| 1959 | Man Accused | Actress | Uncredited |
| 1959 | Top Floor Girl | Miss Prentice | |
| 1960 | Saturday Night and Sunday Morning | Barmaid | Uncredited |
| 1960 | In the Nick | Barmaid | |
| 1960 | The Shakedown | Purple Woman | |
| 1961 | Dangerous Afternoon | Woman Customer at Chemist | |
| 1961 | Three on a Spree | Dowager | Uncredited |
| 1962 | Strongroom (film) | Charlady | |
| 1966 | Munster, Go Home! | Mrs. Moresby | |
| 1967 | The King's Pirate | Molvina MacGregor | |
| 1974 | Airport 1975 | Diana | Uncredited |
| 1976 | Swashbuckler (film) | Landlady | |
| 1986 | The Great Mouse Detective | Mrs. Judson (voice) | Animated film |
| 1986 | Three's Company | Maid | Segment: "The Surgeon" |
| 1988 | Doin' Time on Planet Earth | Teacher | Uncredited |
| 1991 | Switch | Mrs. Weatherspoon | |
| 1993 | Robin Hood: Men in Tights | Villager | Final film role |

=== Television ===
| Year(s) | Title | Role | Notes |
|---|---|---|---|
| 1953 | Rheingold Theatre | Maid | 1 episode |
| 1955 | Quatermass II | Secretary | 1 episode |
| 1956 | The Secrets of the Prairie | Paddy | 3 episodes |
| 1957 | The Grove Family | Mrs. Crichton-Evans | 1 episode |
| 1957–1961 | The Vise | Various | 8 episodes |
| 1958 | ITV Television Playhouse | Mrs. Stark | 1 episode |
| 1958 | Dead Trouble | Madame Juliette | 3 episodes |
| 1959 | Charlesworth | Ella | 1 episode |
| 1959 | No Hiding Place | Customer | 1 episode |
| 1960 | Interpol Calling | Emma | 1 episode, uncredited |
| 1960 | Man from Interpol | Mullins | 1 episode |
| 1962 | Signpost | Ugly Sister | 1 episode |
| 1962–1963 | Fair Exchange | Sybil Finch | 15 episodes |
| 1963 | Glynis | Miss Fuller | 1 episode |
| 1964 | The Rogues | Mrs. Carey | 1 episode |
| 1965 | The Baileys of Balboa | Lady Cowdry | 1 episode |
| 1965–1966 | The Farmer's Daughter | Various roles | 3 episodes |
| 1966 | The Monkees | Mrs. Weefers | 1 episode |
| 1965–1971 | Bewitched | Aunt Hagatha / Aunt Enchantra | 2 episodes |
| 1968–1971 | Hogan's Heroes | Multiple roles incl. Berta Burkhalter | 4 episodes |
| 1969 | Land of the Giants | Nell | 1 episode |
| 1970 | Nanny and the Professor | Dr. Lois Hire | 1 episode |
| 1971 | Night Gallery | Maid | Segment: "The Diary", 1 episode |
| 1972 | Anna and the King | Lady Ramsey | 1 episode |
| 1973 | McMillan & Wife | Flo | 1 episode |
| 1974 | Cannon | Cleaning Woman | 1 episode |
| 1975 | The Six Million Dollar Man | Jessica | 1 episode, uncredited |
| 1976 | Ellery Queen | Edna, the Maid | 1 episode |
| 1978 | Rescue from Gilligan's Island | Mrs. Fellows | TV movie |
| 1981 | Buck Rogers in the 25th Century | Hag | 1 episode |
| 1982 | Help Wanted: Male | Hilda | TV movie |
| 1982 | Fantasy Island | The Old Hag | 1 episode |
| 1983–1984 | General Hospital | Ward Sister Corley | 3 episodes |
