= Calling All Cars =

Calling All Cars may refer to:

- Calling All Cars (band), an Australian rock band
- Calling All Cars (radio program), an old radio program
- Calling All Cars (1935 film), an American crime film
- Calling All Cars (1954 film), a comedy/documentary film starring Cardew Robinson
- "Calling All Cars", a song by Senses Fail from the album Still Searching
- "Calling All Cars" (The Sopranos)
- Calling All Cars!, a 2007 downloadable PlayStation Network video game
