= Little Lady =

1949 film

Cream Puff
- Film poster
- Directed by: Mario Mattoli
- Written by: Aldo De Benedetti; Marcello Marchesi; Mario Mattoli
- Produced by: Isidoro Broggi
- Starring: Gino Bechi; Antonella Lualdi; Aroldo Tieri
- Cinematography: Aldo Tonti
- Edited by: Giuliana Attenni
- Music by: Felice Montagnini
- Production company: Cine Produzione Astoria
- Distributed by: Cinematografica Distributori Indipendenti
- Release date: 1949
- Running time: 85 minutes
- Country: Italy
- Language: Italian

Little Lady (Italian: Signorinella) is a 1949 Italian comedy film directed by Mario Mattoli and starring Gino Bechi, Antonella Lualdi and Aroldo Tieri. It was shot at the Farnesina Studios in Rome and on location around Introdacqua in L'Aquila. The film's sets were designed by the art director Mario Rappini. It earned around 66 million lira at the box office.

== Plot ==
Two young steal a car and drive up into the hills of Abruzzo. There they are mistaken by the inhabitants of a town as the wealthy cousins of a young woman who lives there Maria.

== Cast ==
- Gino Bechi as Don Cesare Balestri
- Antonella Lualdi as Maria Censi
- Aroldo Tieri as Un ladro
- Ave Ninchi as Iris
- Aldo Silvani as Ernesto De Blasi
- Dina Sassoli as Carmela
- Vinicio Sofia as Modesto Rinaldi
- Ughetto Bertucci as Un ladro
- Aldo Bufi Landi as Bruno de Blasi
- Ada Dondini as Cesira, la governante
- Enzo Garinei as Assistante del notaio
- Inga Gort as Monica
- Enrico Viarisio as Comm. Gegé Lapicella

== Bibliography ==
- Aprà, Adriano. The Fabulous Thirties: Italian cinema 1929-1944. Electa International, 1979.
- Chiti, Roberto & Poppi, Roberto. Dizionario del cinema italiano: Dal 1945 al 1959. Gremese Editore, 1991.
