= Huguette Oligny =

Canadian actress (1922–2013)

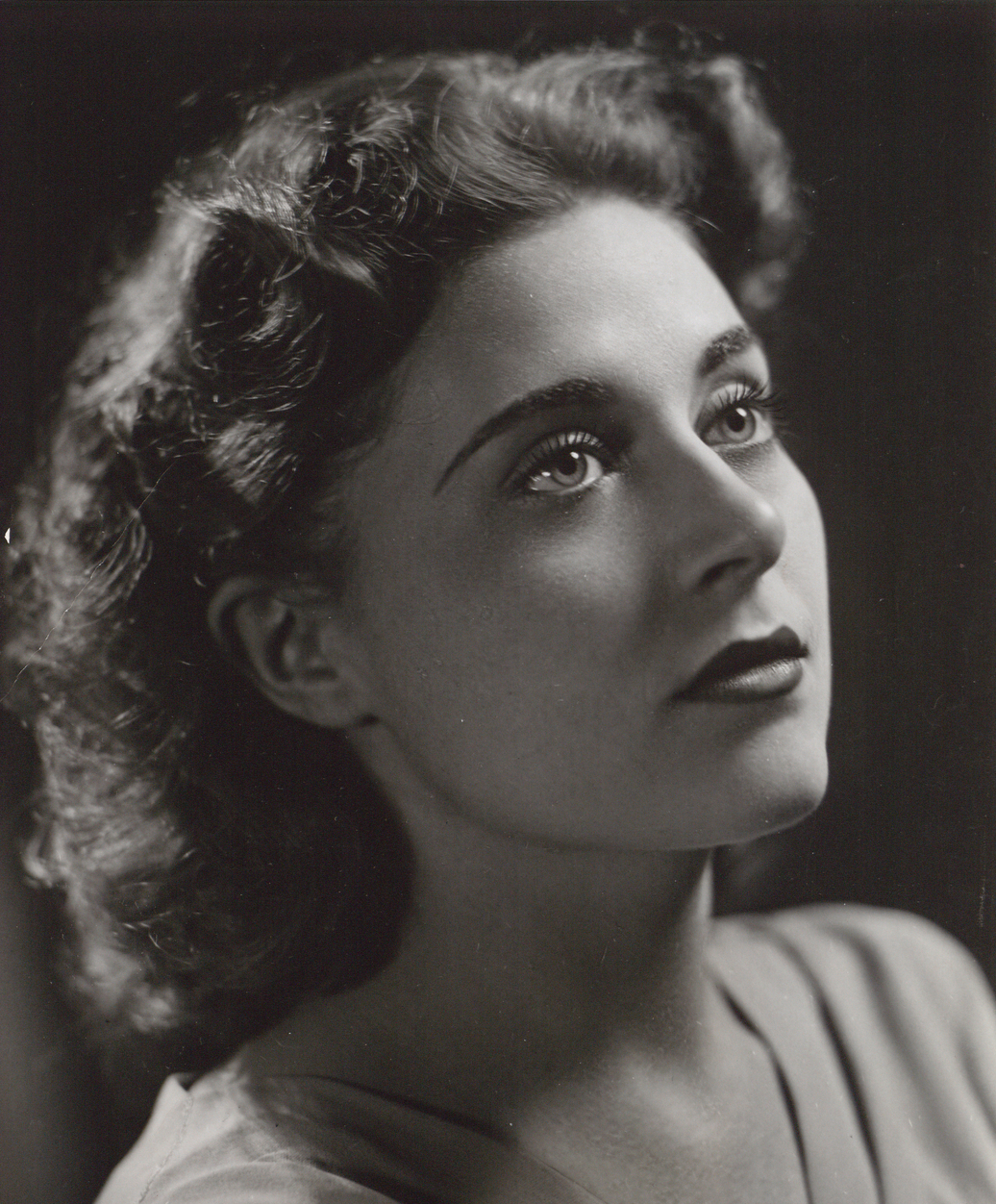
- Huguette Oligny in 1945
- Born: January 31, 1922; Montreal, Quebec, Canada
- Died: May 9, 2013 (aged 91); Montreal, Quebec, Canada

Huguette Oligny, CC OQ (January 31, 1922 – May 9, 2013) was a Canadian actress active in theatre, film and television.

Born in Montreal, Quebec, to a French-Canadian father and French mother, she began her theatrical career in 1939. Though mostly known for having played the great classics of French theatre she also performed in modern Quebec plays, notably by Michel Tremblay. She married Gratien Gélinas, a great pioneer of Quebec theatre, in 1973. Her first marriage to Marcel Alexandre, with whom she had two children, ended in divorce.

In 1984 she was made an Officer of the Order of Canada and was promoted to Companion in 1996. In 1999 she was made an Officer of the National Order of Quebec.

== Filmography ==
Year	Title	Role	Notes
1950	Les lumières de ma ville	Hélène Clément	
1963	Amanita Pestilens	Louise Martin	
1973	Kamouraska	La mère d'Élisabeth	
1975	Don't Push It (Pousse mais pousse égal)	Mme. Gagnon	
1977	The Late Blossom (Le soleil se lève en retard)	Marie Lapointe	
1989	Salut Victor		
1999	The Big Snake of the World (Le grand serpent du monde)	Madame Paradise	
2002	The Book of Eve	Mrs Cooper	
2004	Premier juillet, le film	Mme Biron	
2005	Idole instantanée		
2007	La capture	Lucille	
