= Fighting Mad =

Fighting Mad may refer to:

- Fighting Mad (1917 film), an American silent western film
- Fighting Mad (1939 film), an American adventure film
- Fighting Mad (1957 film), a British film directed by Denis Kavanagh
- Fighting Mad (1976 film), a film directed by Jonathan Demme
- Fighting Mad (horse), an American Thoroughbred mare
- Joe Palooka in Fighting Mad, a 1948 American comedy film
