= David Walker (author) =

Canadian novelist (1911–1992)

David Walker CM MBE
- Born: 9 February 1911; Dundee, Scotland
- Died: 5 March 1992 (aged 81); St Andrews, New Brunswick, Canada
- Occupation: Novelist
- Writing career
- Period: 1955 to 1984
- Genre: Drama

David Harry Walker CM MBE (9 February 1911 – 5 March 1992) was a Canadian novelist. He was born in Dundee, Scotland, later moving to St Andrews, New Brunswick, Canada, where he began his career as a writer. His work has been made into films.

== Biography ==
David Walker married Willa Magee of Montreal on 27 July 1939. The couple had four sons.

== Works ==
- 1949 The Storm and The Silence
- 1950 Geordie
- 1952 The Pillar (also released as The Wire 1953)
- 1953 Digby
- 1955 Wee Geordie
- 1956 Harry Black
- 1957 Sandy was a Soldier's Boy
- 1958 Harry Black and the Tiger
- 1960 Where the High Winds Blow
- 1962 Dragon Hill
- 1962 Storm of Our Journey
- 1963 Amanita Pestilens
- 1964 Winter of Madness
- 1965 Mallabec
- 1966 Come Back, Geordie
- 1968 Devil's Plunge (also released as Cab-Intersec)
- 1969 Big Ben
- 1969 Pirate Rock
- 1972 The Lord's Pink Ocean
- 1973 Black Dougal
- 1976 Ash
- 1977 Pot of Gold
- 1984 Lean, Wind, Lean

Source: [Canadian Books and Authors]
