= Fair Exchange (TV series) =

American TV sitcom series (1962–1963)

- Genre: Sitcom
- Created by: Cy Howard
- Written by: Tom Adair; James B. Allardice; William P. Templeton
- Starring: Eddie Foy Jr. Victor Maddern; Lynn Loring; Judy Carne; Flip Mark; Dennis Waterman; Diana Chesney
- Theme music composer: Cyril J. Mockridge
- Country of origin: United States
- Original language: English
- No. of seasons: 2
- No. of episodes: 26

Production
- Executive producer: Cy Howard
- Camera setup: Multi-camera
- Running time: 45–48 minutes (Season 1); 22–24 minutes (Season 2)
- Production companies: Cy Howard Productions; Desilu Productions

Original release
- Network: CBS
- Release: September 21, 1962 – September 19, 1963

Fair Exchange is an American television sitcom that ran from September 21, 1962, to December 28, 1962, and from March 28, 1963, to September 19, 1963, on CBS. It starred Judy Carne.

== Premise ==
Eddie Walker and Thomas Finch were World War II veterans and old friends who decided to have their teenage daughters live in each other's households for a year because Eddie's daughter Patty wanted to study at the Royal Academy of Dramatic Arts in London.

While Patty lived in London with Tommy, his wife Sybil, and their son Neville, Tommy's daughter Heather lived with Eddie, his wife Dorothy, and their son, Tommy, in New York City.

The show focused on the joys and the difficulties that Heather and Patty experienced as they lived in each other's families.

Heather had troubles in trying to deal with a less formality ridden way of life in New York City and in the States, while Patty was trying to deal with the more formal and more tradition-emphasized way of life in London.

The fathers had their own share of difficulties in trying to help the daughters to adjust, while Dorothy and Sybil, while also having to adjust with different girls living in their households, were able to take it more in stride.

== Cast ==
- Eddie Foy Jr. as Eddie Walker
- Audrey Christie as Dorothy Walker
- Victor Maddern as Thomas Finch
- Diana Chesney as Sybil Finch
- Lynn Loring as Patty Walker
- Dennis Waterman as Neville Finch
- Judy Carne as Heather Finch
- Flip Mark as Larry Walker
- Maurice Dallimore as Willie Shorthouse

== Episodes ==
=== Season 1 (1962) ===
No. overall	No. in season	Title	Directed by	Written by	Original release date
1	1	"Pilot"	Unknown	William Templeton	September 21, 1962
2	2	"Unfair Exchange"	Unknown	William Templeton	September 28, 1962
3	3	"Is There a Doctor in the House?"	Unknown	Unknown	October 5, 1962
4	4	"Neville's Problem"	Unknown	Unknown	October 12, 1962
5	5	"To Each His Own"	Unknown	Unknown	October 19, 1962
6	6	"A Little Success"	Unknown	Unknown	October 26, 1962
7	7	"No More Transatlantic Calls"	Unknown	Unknown	November 2, 1962
8	8	"Lieutenant's Paradise"	Unknown	Unknown	November 9, 1962
9	9	"Nothing Ventured"	Unknown	Unknown	November 16, 1962
10	10	"Dorothy's Trip to Europe"	Unknown	Unknown	November 23, 1962
11	11	"A Young Man's Fancy"	Unknown	Unknown	November 30, 1962
12	12	"Yankee Doodle Dandy"	Unknown	Unknown	December 7, 1962
13	13	"Honor Thy Foster Father"	Unknown	Unknown	December 14, 1962
14	14	"Twas the Fortnight Before Christmas"	Unknown	Unknown	December 21, 1962
15	15	"Innocents Abroad"	Unknown	Unknown	December 28, 1962

=== Season 2 (1963) ===
No. overall	No. in season	Title	Directed by	Written by	Original release date
16	1	"My Son, the Lawyer"	Unknown	Laurence Marks	March 28, 1963
17	2	"My Fair Scot"	Unknown	James Allardice & Tom Adair	April 4, 1963
18	3	"How You Gonna Get 'em Back on the Farm?"	Unknown	James Allardice & Tom Adair	April 11, 1963
19	4	"You Don't Have to Polish a Subway"	Unknown	Richard M. Powell	April 18, 1963
20	5	"A Woman's Place"	Unknown	John Whedon	April 25, 1963
21	6	"The Jinx"	Unknown	Jerry Seelen & Leo Rifkin	May 2, 1963
22	7	"Never Trust a Banjo Player"	Unknown	Richard M. Powell	May 9, 1963
23	8	"Weddings are for Parents"	Unknown	Richard M. Powell	May 16, 1963
24	9	"Neville, The Pearlie"	Unknown	Laurence Marks	May 23, 1963
25	10	"Character Building"	Unknown	Phil Sharp	June 6, 1963
26	11	"Mess of Porridge"	Unknown	John Whedon	June 13, 1963

== Production ==
Fair Exchange replaced Rod Serling's The Twilight Zone. The series was "an unusual experiment in full-hour comedy", and "television's first one-hour situation comedy". Early reviews of the program were favorable, but its ratings were not good.

Some sources say that after mail protested CBS's decision to cancel the show, the network revived Fair Exchange in a half-hour format, but CBS announced on November 30, 1962, that the program would return in the shorter format. The network had already "agreed to film 13 half-hour episodes for showing next spring."

Again the series failed in the ratings and was finally cancelled. The Twilight Zone would replace Fair Exchange mid-season, albeit in an hour-long format. Preliminary plans had called for The Alfred Hitchcock Hour to replace it.

Episodes were filmed in Hollywood and in England. The 1962 episodes were broadcast 9:30-10:30 p.m. Eastern Time on Fridays. The 1963 episodes were broadcast 7:30-8 p.m. ET on Thursdays. Competing shows in 1962 included 77 Sunset Strip on ABC and Don't Call Me Charlie! and The Jack Paar Show on NBC. In 1963, the competition included The Adventures of Ozzie and Harriet and Wide Country on NBC.

Cy Howard was the executive producer, and Ed Feldman was the producer. Jerry Thorpe was the director.
