= Hangman's Wharf =

1950 British film by Cecil H. Williamson

- Opening titles
- Directed by: Cecil H. Williamson
- Written by: John Beldon; Cecil H. Williamson
- Produced by: Edwin J. Fancey
- Starring: John Witty; Genine Graham; Patience Rentoul; Campbell Singer
- Cinematography: Cecil H. Williamson
- Production company: E.J. Fancey Productions
- Distributed by: DUK
- Release date: January 1950
- Running time: 73 minutes
- Country: United Kingdom
- Language: English

Hangman's Wharf is a 1950 British second feature ('B') crime film directed by Cecil H. Williamson and starring John Witty, Genine Graham and Campbell Singer. It was written by John Beldon and Williamson based on Beldon's 1948 BBC radio serial Hangman's Wharf.

The story concerns a doctor called out for an emergency on a ship docked in the River Thames, where he is framed for murder.

== Plot ==
Doctor David Galloway takes over a practice in Shadwell, and is called to the ship Villefranche, docked at Hangman's Wharf. On his arrival the ship's owner, Sir Brian Roderick, immediately orders him to leave. Galloway is subsequently suspected of the murder of Winston Merrick, but the Villefranche and Roderick have disappeared, and so has Galloway's alibi. With the help of reporter Alison Maxwell, Galloway sets about proving his innocence.

== Cast ==
- John Witty as Doctor David Galloway
- Genine Graham as Alison Maxwell
- Patience Rentoul as Mrs Williams
- Gerald Nodin as Sir Brian Roderick
- Campbell Singer as Inspector Prebble
- Max Brimmell as Krim
- Patricia Laffan as Rosa Warren

== Production ==
Location shooting was done along the River Thames and at Falmouth and St Mawes. The railway station at which Galloway as arrives in Cornwall was St Ives.

== Reception ==
Kine Weekly wrote: "Lively acting takes up verbal slack and enables it to ride on an even keel to an appropriate and exciting climax. ... John Witty is inclined to shout and he is not too sure of his accent, but he, nevertheless, contributes a forthright portrayal as Galloway, and Genine Grahame is a likeable Alison. The rest are up to scratch. The cast set about the tongue-in-the-cheek crime play with obvious relish and their hearty teamwork, together with impressive shots of London's famous river, puts quite a kick into its artless blood and thunder."

Picturegoer wrote: "The cast works well in what is basically complete hokum, but lines and situations do not give the players a chance to shine."

In British Sound Films: The Studio Years 1928–1959 David Quinlan rated the film as "mediocre", writing: "Filmization of a radio serial shows up all its less likely aspects."
