= Soho Conspiracy =

1950 British film by Cecil H. Williamson

- Directed by: Cecil H. Williamson
- Written by: Ralph Dawson; Cecil H. Williamson; Mario Monicelli; Stefano Vanzina
- Produced by: Edwin J. Fancey
- Starring: Zena Marshall; Jacques Labrecque; Peter Gawthorne; John Witty
- Cinematography: Ray Densham
- Music by: Felice Montagnini
- Production company: E.J. Fancey Productions
- Distributed by: DUK
- Release date: October 1950
- Running time: 85 minutes
- Country: United Kingdom
- Language: English

Soho Conspiracy is a 1950 British 'B' musical drama film directed by Cecil H. Williamson and starring Jacques Labrecque, Zena Marshall and Peter Gawthorne. It was written by Ralph Dawson, Williamson, Mario Monicelli and Stefano Vanzina.

== Premise ==
A young man attempts to stage a charity concert in order to raise funds to refurbish a Soho church.

== Production ==
The film incorporates footage from the 1948 Italian film Mad About Opera (Follie per l'opera) for the climactic concert performance.

== Cast ==
- Zena Marshall as Dora
- Jacques Labrecque as Carlo Scala
- Peter Gawthorne as Father Shaney
- John Witty as Guy
- Max Harrison as Gondotti brother
- Syd Harrison as Gondotti brother
- Gino Bechi as himself
- Beniamino Gigli as himself
- Tito Gobbi as himself
- Tito Schipa as himself

== Critical reception ==
The Monthly Film Bulletin wrote: "Gay but amateurish film, whose main virtue is the singing by the Italian stars; this, however, appears to have been contrived by the wholesale lifting of excerpts from other (unnamed) films."

The Daily Film Renter wrote: "A curious mixture, lavishly produced, of melodrama and slapstick, in which the comedy is more easily followed than the story itself."

In British Sound Films: The Studio Years 1928–1959 David Quinlan rated the film as "mediocre", writing: "Cut-price film 'borrows' wholesale from earlier movies for its distinguished 'guest stars'"
