= Cecil Williamson =

British screenwriter and film director (1909–1999)

- Born: 19 September 1909; Paignton, Devon, England
- Died: 9 December 1999 (aged 90)
- Occupations: MI6 Operative; Witch
- Spouse: Gwen Wilcox

Cecil Williamson (18 September 1909 – 9 December 1999) was a British screenwriter, editor and film director and influential English Neopagan Warlock. He was the founder of both the Witchcraft Research Center which was a part of MI6's war against Nazi Germany, and the Museum of Witchcraft. He was a friend of both Gerald Gardner, who was the founder of Wicca, and also of the notorious occultist Aleister Crowley.

== Biography ==
=== Early life ===
Williamson was born in Paignton, Devon, England. His father was an officer in the Royal Navy and was posted abroad. He claimed he first encountered witchcraft in 1916, when, on a visit to North Bovey, also in Devon, to visit his uncle, a local vicar, he supposedly saw a woman being publicly beaten and accused of being a witch. Williamson claimed he tried to defend the woman, and in doing so befriended her.

In 1921, whilst at the boarding school Malvern College, Williamson was bullied, but he claimed got help from a woman who lived on the school grounds, who was also a witch. She showed him how to cast a spell on the bully, who soon after broke his leg in a skiing accident and stopped bullying Cecil.

During Summer holidays, Williamson often went to visit Dinard in France with his grandmother and her friend Mona Mackenzie. Mackenzie was a spirit medium, and she taught Williamson about divination.

=== Life in Rhodesia ===
After studying in college, Williamson travelled to Rhodesia (modern Zimbabwe) to grow tobacco, where his servant, Zandonda, taught him about African magic.

=== Life in Britain ===
In 1930, Williamson returned to Britain and moved to London, where he began working as a production assistant at several film studios. As a hobby, he continued to investigate the occult, beginning to collect objects and became an acquaintance of Margaret Murray, Montague Summers and Aleister Crowley.

In 1933, he married Gwen Wilcox, a make-up artist, and niece of film director Herbert Wilcox.

=== World War II ===
In 1938, MI6 hired Williamson to investigate the Nazis' occult interests, and in doing so he formed the Witchcraft Research Center. An April 1944 news report, while not mentioning the Witchcraft Research Center nor Williamson, reflects their area of expertise in claiming Goebbels was going to 'harness fortune telling, astrology, and necromancy to his propaganda machine'.

=== Gardner and the Museum ===
In 1946, Williamson met Gerald Gardner in the Atlantis Bookshop in London at a talk which Gardner was giving. The two became friends largely due to their mutual interest in the theory of the pagan witch cult.

In 1947, Williamson tried to open a museum about witchcraft in Stratford-on-Avon, but was forced to change his plans after local opposition. In 1948, Williamson bought a dilapidated windmill at Castletown on the Isle of Man. He turned it into the Folklore Center of Superstition and Witchcraft, and opened it in 1949, along with an adjacent restaurant, the Witches' Kitchen.

Williamson employed Gardner to be the 'resident witch' at the museum, which had been renamed the Museum of Magic and Witchcraft after the repeal of the Witchcraft Act 1735 in 1951. However, Williamson and Gardner's relationship began to fall apart, and Williamson wanted to return to England. So in 1952 he sold the museum to Gardner, and moved all his artefacts to a new site, in Windsor, renaming it the Museum of Witchcraft. Gardner, using his own artefact collection, continued to run the museum on the Isle of Man for the rest of his life.

At Windsor, Williamson's museum remained open for a year, and was quite successful, but was again forced out due to local opposition. In 1954 he therefore moved the museum to Bourton-on-the-Water in Gloucestershire. Here, the museum was damaged in an arson attack, and so, in 1960, Williamson moved the museum to Boscastle in Cornwall, where it remains to this day.

=== Final years ===
At midnight on 31 October 1996, Williamson sold the museum to Graham King. Williamson retained some of his artefacts (but none that were on display in the museum) at his home in [Witheridge], a small village near to Tiverton in Devon. After his death in 1999 much of his private collection was acquired by the museum.

== Selected filmography ==
Director

- Soho Conspiracy (1950)
- Hangman's Wharf (1950)
- Action Stations (1956)

Editor

- Up for the Derby (1933)
- Girls, Please! (1934)
- The Way of Youth (1934)
- The Village Squire (1935)
- Troubled Waters (1936)
- Blind Man's Bluff (1936)
- The Minstrel Boy (1937)
- The Mill on the Floss (1937)
- Jailbirds (1940)
- Three Silent Men (1940)
- Old Mother Riley in Paris (1942)
