= Harry Black (film) =

1958 film by Hugo Fregonese

- Directed by: Hugo Fregonese
- Written by: Sydney Boehm
- Based on: novel by David Walker
- Produced by: John Brabourne
- Starring: Barbara Rush; Stewart Granger; I. S. Johar; Anthony Steel; Martin Stephens; Frank Olegario
- Cinematography: John Wilcox
- Edited by: Reginald Beck
- Music by: Clifton Parker
- Distributed by: 20th Century Fox
- Release date: 22 July 1958
- Running time: 107 minutes
- Country: United Kingdom
- Language: English
- Box office: 451,824 admissions (France)

Harry Black (also known as Harry Black and the Tiger) is a 1958 British adventure film directed by Hugo Fregonese and starring Stewart Granger, Barbara Rush, Anthony Steel, and I. S. Johar in a BAFTA nominated role. It was written by Sydney Boehm based on the novel Harry Black by David Walker.

== Plot ==
Professional hunter Harry Black is in India. He wants to kill a tiger that is threatening a village. As he proceeds on his journey, he encounters numerous people, including the young, and maybe too smart, Desmond Tanner and his wife Chris, who was Harry's past love.

== Cast ==
- Stewart Granger as Harry Black
- Barbara Rush as Christian Tanner
- Anthony Steel as Desmond Tanner
- I. S. Johar as Bapu
- Martin Stephens as Michael Tanner
- Frank Olegario as Dr. Chowdhury
- Kamala Devi as Nurse Somola
- John Helier as German Sergeant
- Tom Bowman as British officer
- Allan McClelland as British officer
- Harold Siddons as British officer
- Norman Johns as British officer
- Gladys Boot as Mrs. Tanner
- George Curzon as Mr. Philip Tanner
- Archie Duncan as Woolsey
- John Rae as fisherman
- Jan Conrad as tower guard
- Michael Seavers as Frenchman
- André Maranne as Frenchman

== Novel ==
First edition

The book was published in 1956. It was by David Walker, who had been an officer in the British army and an aide to John Buchan. Walker had emigrated to Canada.

The New York Times called it "a most intelligent novel". An obituary of Walker said " the symbolism and allegorical overtones helped raise it to the level of a kind of jungle Moby Dick."

== Production ==
Film rights were purchased by 20th Century Fox in March 1956.

In July 1957 John Brabourne was assigned to produce, in part because he was son-in-law of Lord Mountbatten, former viceroy of India, and thus had many contacts in that country.

In August Fox announced Stewart Granger and Anthony Steel would star. At this stage of his career Granger was making movies primarily to finance the ranch he owned with then-wife Jean Simmons.

In September it was announced Sydney Boehm was writing the script. Boehm was promoted to producer at Fox but did not produce Harry Black.

Also in September Fox announced Hugo Frugonese would direct as the first of a three-picture contract with the studio.

Stewart Granger and Anthony Steel signed to play the lead roles. Brabourne cast IS Johar after hearing the actor speak at the London Indian Film Festival.

Filming began in India on 2 January 1958. Filming was completed by March. Don Sharp was in charge of second unit directing.

== Reception ==
=== Box office ===
Kinematograph Weekly listed it as being "in the money" at the British box office in 1958.

=== Critical ===
The Monthly Film Bulletin wrote: "A trite and unconvincing adaptation of a novel which seems to have had point and irony is padded out with flashbacks of such exceptional banality that even the suspenseful tiger hunt loses its fascination. Stewart Granger and Barbara Rush survive some wretched dialogue with some credit, but Anthony Steel's performance as the conscience-stricken coward is distinctly stolid. The Indian exteriors and fauna are strikingly well photographed. Otherwise the treatment is cursory and the sound-track often deafening."

The Los Angeles Times called it a "most uncommonly intelligent and excellent film."

The New York Times called it "slow, unconvincing and pretty dull."

FilmInk said "The movie was a fine chance for Steel to reinvent himself, but he is unable to suggest the inner demons of his character. (As adventure tale, it is too slow, but is redeemed by location footage.)"

In The Radio Times Guide to Films Brian Baxter gave the film 2/5 stars, writing: "Director Hugo Fregonese makes the best of the love triangle situation, but this is still weak, although the Indian locations keep things interesting to look at."
