= Fighting Mad (1957 film) =

1957 British film by Denis Kavanagh

- Theatrical release poster
- Directed by: Denis Kavanagh
- Screenplay by: Jennifer Whyatt
- Produced by: E.J. Fancey; Edwin Scott
- Starring: Joe Robinson; Adrienne Scott; Jack Taylor
- Cinematography: Hal Morey
- Edited by: Monica Kimick
- Music by: Jackie Brown
- Production company: Border Films
- Release date: 7 March 1957
- Running time: 53 minutes
- Country: United Kingdom
- Language: English

For the 1917, 1939 and 1976 films of the same name see Fighting Mad. Fighting Mad is a 1957 British 'B' film directed by Denis Kavanagh and starring Joe Robinson, Adrienne Scott and Jack Taylor. The screenplay was by Jennnifer Whyatt. It was produced by E.J. Fancey and Edwin Scott.

== Plot ==
After killing two opponents in the ring, Glaswegian boxer Muscles Tanner decides to move with his wife to start a new life in Canada. He finds his Uncle Jake, who is prospecting for oil, being threatened by a group of lumbermen, who try to murder Muscles. With the help of the Mounted Police, Muscles defeats the gang so his uncle can stake his claim.

== Cast ==
- Joe Robinson as Mike "Muscles" Tanner
- Adrienne Scott as Paula
- Jack Taylor as Walkers
- Beckett Bould as Old Jake
- Colin Cleminson as Danvers (as Colin Clemenson)
- Ross Walters as Digger
- Bernard Walters as Sergeant Plat
- Geoff Roberts as Goldie

== Critical reception ==
The Monthly Film Bulletin wrote: "Although the story contains a certain amount of roughly contrived action, its many naiveties and lack of authenticity (the locations were shot in Scotland) limit its power to excite. The acting also is sadly unprofessional; it is obvious that these Mounties have never seen Canada."

Kine Weekly wrote: "Hearty alfresco thick ear ... The picture, actually made in the wilds of Scotland, has convincing lumber camp atmosphere and the natural backgrounds artfully mellow its unvarnished rough stuff. Joe Robinson displays quite a torso as Muscles, Adrienne Scott is a spirited Paula, Beckett Bould contributes an amusing cameo as Uncle Jake and Jack Taylor and Colin Cleminson are in their element as the villains. The dialogue fails to reach a high literary standard and the editing lacks polish, but the overall is nevertheless a good slogging match."

In British Sound Films: The Studio Years 1928–1959 David Quinlan rated the film as "poor", writing: "Very amateurish; with a hero called Muscles, its chances weren't high to begin with."

Chibnall and McFarlane in The British 'B' Film wrote: "Jennifer Whyatt's script failed to reach literary heights, but there was enough rough stuff and spectacular background scenery to keep audiences entertained for fifty minutes."

== Home media ==
The film was released in 2019 on DVD by Renown Pictures as part of the 3-disc box set The E.J. Fancey Collection.
