= Maurice Dallimore =

English actor (1912–73)

- Maurice Dallimore in The Monkees (1968)
- Born: 23 June 1912; Essex, England
- Died: 20 February 1973 (aged 60); Los Angeles, California, U.S.
- Other name: Maurice Albert Dalimore
- Occupation: Actor
- Years active: 1960–1973

Maurice Albert Dallimore (23 June 1912 – 20 February 1973) was an English actor who lived and worked mostly in the United States. Most noted for portraying proper British character roles, he appeared as a regular or recurring character on many TV shows which included such series as 77 Sunset Strip, The Jack Benny Show, the ABC-TV series Honey West, McHale's Navy, the ABC-TV series Batman, where he appeared as Superintendent Watson, I Dream of Jeannie, The Monkees and Fair Exchange. He appeared in an episode of The Tab Hunter Show in 1961. In 1965, he appeared on Petticoat Junction, playing Faversham in the episode "The Butler Did It". He also appeared in an episode of the Rifleman.

Dallimore died in Hollywood, California on 20 February 1973, of Laennec's cirrhosis. He was 60 years old. Maurice married Gertrude Bernice Larson 1909-1970 on 2 June 1961 in Middlebury Connecticut. She was the daughter of Andrew Larson 1876-1937 and Sarah Bryan 1878-1947.

== Filmography ==
Year	Title	Role	Notes
1960	North to Alaska	Bartender	Uncredited
1962	Tender Is the Night	Sir Charles Golding	Uncredited
1962	Lad, A Dog	Lester, the Chauffeur	
1963	The Three Stooges Go Around the World in a Daze	Scotland Yard Inspector J. B. Crotchet	
1964	My Fair Lady	Selsey Man	Uncredited
1965	Strange Bedfellows	Gentleman in Rain	Uncredited
1965	The Collector	The Neighbor	
1965	The Wackiest Ship in the Army	Tweed Cap	Episode: "Boomer McKye"
1966	Batman	United Kingdom Delegate	Uncredited
1966	Not With My Wife, You Don't!	BBC Commentaton	
1969	The Comic	Lord Faversham	Uncredited
1971	Adam-12	Basil Farrington	S3, E24 "Post Time"
1971	Johnny Got His Gun	British Colonel	
1971	The Million Dollar Duck	Englishman	Uncredited
1974	How to Seduce a Woman	Butler	(final film role)
