= Joe Robinson (actor) =

English actor, martial artist, and professional wrestler (1927–2017)

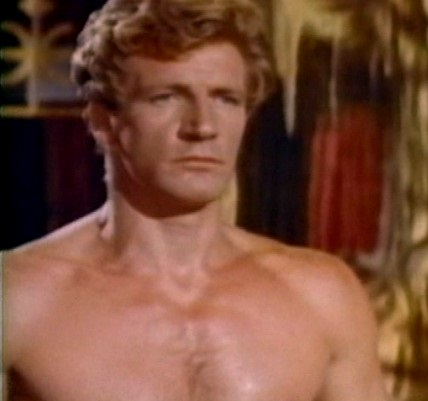
- Joe Robinson as Thor in Thor and the Amazon Women
- Born: Joseph William Robinson Harle; 31 May 1927; Newcastle upon Tyne, Northumberland, England
- Died: 3 July 2017 (aged 90); Brighton, East Sussex, England
- Education: Royal Academy of Dramatic Art
- Occupations: Actor, martial artist, professional wrestler
- Years active: 1952–1971
- Relatives: Doug Robinson (brother)
- Professional wrestling career
- Ring name: "Tiger" Joe Robinson
- Billed height: 6 ft 2 in (188 cm)
- Trained by: Jack Robinson

Joseph William Robinson Harle (31 May 1927 – 3 July 2017) was an English actor, martial artist, and professional wrestler. He was known during his wrestling career by the ring name "Tiger" Joe Robinson.

== Early life ==
Robinson was born in Newcastle upon Tyne in 1927. He was the son of Joseph Spedding Robinson, sometimes called Jack Robinson, a Cumberland and Westmorland wrestling champion-turned-professional wrestler. His grandfather John was also a wrestler.

In 1931, Robinson and his family moved to South Africa, where his father ran a gym. Robinson worked in his father's gym, and trained in catch wrestling and bodybuilding from a young age. He later took up Japanese martial arts, obtaining black belts in Wadō-ryū karate (8th dan) and judo (5th dan).

== Professional wrestling ==
Robinson returned to England in 1948, settling in London in 1950 while studying at the Royal Academy of Dramatic Art. He met promoter Atholl Oakeley, who began booking him as a professional wrestler under the ring name "Tiger" Joe Robinson. He won the European Heavyweight Championship in 1952, after beating Axel Cadier.

According to The Times, Robinson "was not generally regarded as an uncompromisingly hard shooter." After injuring his back wrestling in Paris he decided to concentrate on acting.

== Film career ==
Robinson's first role came in the keep-fit documentary Fit as a Fiddle and in the same year, 1952, he followed it up with a part as Harry 'Muscles' Green in the musical Wish You Were Here in the West End of London.

He made his film debut in 1955's A Kid for Two Farthings, in which he wrestled Primo Carnera. Other big-screen appearances include 1961's Carry On Regardless, of the British institution the Carry Ons.

Robinson also claimed he turned down the role of the Rank Organisation's Gongman, a part that went to another wrestler, Kenneth Richmond.

His film and television career really took off in the 1960s and in 1962 he appeared in British classic The Loneliness of the Long Distance Runner alongside appearances in The Saint and The Avengers in 1963. He was Honor Blackman's fight trainer for The Avengers. Together with Blackman and his younger brother Doug, Robinson authored Honor Blackman's Book of Self-Defence in 1965 (Joe was also a judo champion and black belt at karate). The year after he appeared in an episode of the sitcom Pardon the Expression which referenced this book.

in 1960 was invited to Rome where he appeared in five muscle-bound Italian epics, including Taur the Mighty (1963), Thor and the Amazon Women (1963) and Ursus and the Tartar Princess (1961). According to the book Tarzan of the Movies by Gabe Essoe, Robinson played the role of Tarzan in obscure Italian-made films (Taur, il re della forza bruta and Le gladiatrici); the use of the Tarzan character, however, was unauthorised and the character's name had to be changed to Thaur before the film was allowed for public release. He also appeared in Barabbas and Erik the Conqueror both in 1961.

His final big-screen appearance was in the 1971 James Bond film Diamonds Are Forever in which he plays diamond smuggler Peter Franks. Robinson claimed that he was a contender for the Red Grant role in From Russia with Love. Though he did not get it, Connery recommended him for the role in Diamonds are Forever.

== Retirement and later life ==
Robinson retired from acting in the early 1970s, and lived in Brighton, where he opened a martial arts centre, conducting classes in Wadō-ryū and Judo. One of his notable pupils was Brian Jacks, winner of Britain's first medal at a World Judo Championships taking a bronze in Salt Lake City 1967, and gained a second bronze at the 1972 Munich Olympics.

In March 1998 the 70-year-old Robinson hit the headlines after fighting off a gang of at least eight muggers single-handed when he was attacked after alighting from a bus in Cape Town; the gang struck with baseball bats and knives, but the 6 ft 2 inch-tall Robinson overpowered two with flying kicks, karate-chopped another, and broke the arm of a fourth with a punch- the rest fled. Robinson suffered "only minor cuts and grazes" and continued to enjoy his holiday.

== Personal life ==
Robinson's was married twice, and had four children. His daughter, Polly Robinson (Hardy-Stewart), has also continued the family's success in martial arts by winning the junior Judo championships in the 1980s. His granddaughter Kyra is an IBJIF Brazilian jiu-jitsu champion, and another granddaughter, Phoebe, is a stunt performer.

Robinson's brother, Doug (1930–2021), was a well-known stunt performer who notably doubled for Telly Savalas and James Coburn.

== Death ==
Robinson died in Brighton, East Sussex on 3 July 2017, at the age of 90.

== Filmography ==
Year	Title	Role	Notes
1955	A Kid for Two Farthings	Sam Heppner	
1956	Die ganze Welt singt nur Amore	Max	
1956	Action Stations	Pete Archer	
1957	Fighting Mad	Muscles Tanner	
1957	The Flesh Is Weak	Lofty	
1958	The Strange Awakening	Sven	
1958	Sea Fury	Hendrik	
1958	Murder Reported	Jim	
1960	The Two Faces of Dr. Jekyll	Corinthian	Uncredited
1960	The Bulldog Breed	Tall Sailor	
1961	Carry On Regardless	Dynamite Dan	
1961	Erik the Conqueror	Garian	Uncredited
1961	Barabbas	Bearded Gladiator	
1961	Tartar Invasion	Ursus	
1962	The Loneliness of the Long Distance Runner	Roach	
1963	Taur, il re della forza bruta	Taur	
1963	Doctor in Distress	Sonja's Boyfriend	
1963	Thor and the Amazon Women	Thor	
1971	Diamonds Are Forever	Peter Franks	(final film role)
