= Amanita Pestilens =

1963 Canadian film

- Directed by: René Bonnière
- Written by: David Walker
- Produced by: F. R. Crawley
- Starring: Jacques Labrecque; Huguette Oligny
- Cinematography: Frank Stokes
- Edited by: René Bonnière
- Music by: Larry Crosley
- Production company: Crawley Films
- Release date: 1963
- Running time: 79 minutes
- Country: Canada
- Language: English
- Budget: est. C$275,000

Amanita Pestilens is a 1963 Canadian psychological horror-fantasy/drama film produced by F. R. Crawley, and directed by René Bonnière. It was "the first Canadian feature film to be shot in both English and French with the same set of actors". It included an early career performance by Geneviève Bujold, along with performances by Jacques Labrecque and Huguette Oligny. It was filmed at Harrington Lake, Québec.

The film's script was written by Canadian author David Walker and was initially titled Staircases. Bonnière persuaded Crawley to fund and produce a film based on this script. The new title, Amanita Pestilens, meant "Poisoned Love".

== Premise ==
The plot concerns a Montreal suburbanite who becomes obsessed with his award-winning lawn, which has become infested with a ground fungus. His neighbour across the street identifies the species as Amanita pestilens (not a real species, although Amanita is a real genus). The mushrooms prove impossible to eradicate, and the homeowner directs all his efforts to getting rid of them, to the exclusion of all else. His obsession very nearly destroys his life and leads to a deadly confrontation with his neighbour. A surprise ending, however, gives the viewer hope that the main character will see the error of his ways.

== Cast ==
- Jacques Labrecque as Henri Martin
- Huguette Oligny as Louise Martin
- Geneviève Bujold as Sophie Martin
- Benoît Girard as Simon
- Blake James as Cram
- Jean-Louis Millette as Bank manager
- Julien Lippé as Thunder Sr.
- Gabriel Vigneault
- Pierre Baron
- Denise Bombardier
- Georges Cortez as Striptease Club Manager
- Ronald France as Neighbour
- J. Léo Gagnon as Neighbour
- Gisèle
- Juliette Huot

== Production ==
Amanita Pestilens was the second Canadian colour film, after Étienne Brûlé gibier de potence/The Immortal Scoundrel from 1952, and it was the first to be shot in English and French.

== Release ==
The film was screened at the Berlin International Film Festival in 1965. It was broadcast on West German television and also broadcast into East Germany. Despite the innovations of its bilingual, colour production, Amanita Pestilens was a commercial failure.

There is no known video release although the film was shown on Moviepix (Mpix) on 10 May 1998.

== Works cited ==
- Melnyk, George (2004). One Hundred Years of Canadian Cinema. University of Toronto Press. ISBN 080203568X.
