= The White South =

1949 novel by Hammond Innes

- First edition
- Author: Hammond Innes
- Language: English
- Genre: Thriller
- Publisher: William Collins & Sons
- Publication date: 1949
- Publication place: United Kingdom
- Media type: Print

The White South is a 1949 thriller novel by the British writer Hammond Innes. It is set on a whaling factory ship operation in the Antarctic Ocean.

In 1954 it was adapted into the film Hell Below Zero directed by Mark Robson and starring Alan Ladd and Stanley Baker.

In his obituary of Innes, Jack Adrian described The White South as "the book that was instrumental in lifting him out of the general ruck of thriller writers, establishing him as a writer that serious critics (such as Elizabeth Bowen and J.W. Lambert) took seriously".

== Bibliography ==
- Goble, Alan. The Complete Index to Literary Sources in Film. Walter de Gruyter, 1999.
