= Beckett Bould =

English actor (1880–1970)

- 1936 Spotlight photo
- Born: William Beckett Bould; 28 September 1880; Dewsbury, West Riding of Yorkshire, England
- Died: 25 September 1970 (aged 89); Northwood, Middlesex, England
- Occupation: Actor

Beckett Bould (28 September 1880 – 25 September 1970) was a British actor.

Bould was a schoolmaster for many years and started his screen career in 1932. He debuted on stage in 1940 at Henry Miller's Theatre and performed in 15 plays.

== Partial filmography ==
- Black Diamonds (1932) — John Morgan
- The Outcast (1934) — Minor Role (uncredited)
- Wednesday's Luck (1936) — Minor Role (uncredited)
- Holiday's End (1937) — Philpotts
- South Riding (1938) — Foreman on Road Building Site (uncredited)
- Old Mother Riley's Circus (1941) — Davis
- The Day Will Dawn (1942) — Bergen, Spokesman of Langedal
- Let the People Sing (1942) — Minor Role (uncredited)
- The Shipbuilders (1943)
- Loyal Heart (1946) — Burton
- The October Man (1947) — Policeman at Left Luggage Office (uncredited)
- Anna Karenina (1948) — Matvey
- My Brother's Keeper (1948) — Inspector (uncredited)
- Portrait of Clare (1950) — Bissell
- Pool of London (1951) — The Murdered Watchman (uncredited)
- What Every Woman Wants (1954) — Tom
- Lease of Life (1954) — Sproatley
- Ramsbottom Rides Again (1956)
- Fighting Mad (1957) — Jake
- Let's Be Happy (1957) — Rev. MacDonald
- Second Fiddle (1957) — General
- Rock You Sinners (1958) — McIver
- Nowhere to Go (1958) — Gamekeeper (uncredited)
- The Flesh and the Fiends (1960) — Old Angus
- The Angry Silence (1960) — Arkwright
- Don't Bother to Knock (1961) — Old Man
