= John Witty =

British actor (1915–1990)

- Born: Rupert John Blanchflower Featherstone-Witty; 17 September 1915; Bristol, Gloucestershire, England, United Kingdom
- Died: 14 January 1990 (aged 74); Bristol, England, United Kingdom
- Years active: 1946-1980
- Spouse: Genine Graham

John Witty (1915–1990) was a British film and television actor.

Witty's distinguished voice appeared extensively on various series and documentary short films. He presented the TV series Mail Call (1955–56) with his wife Genine Graham. He was the TV Announcer for the 1961 film The Frightened City, the Computer Voice for the 1969 Doctor Who serial The Seeds of Death and the Announcer Voice for the 1979 television version of Dick Barton.

== Filmography ==
Year	Title	Role	Notes
1948	Love in Waiting	Harry Pepperfield	
1950	Hangman's Wharf	David Galloway, M.D.	
1950	Seven Days to Noon	Minor Role	Uncredited
1950	Soho Conspiracy	Guy Potbury	
1951	Captain Horatio Hornblower R.N.	Capt. Entenza	
1953	Three's Company	Manning	(segment "The Surgeon' story)
1954	Hell Below Zero	Martens	
1954	Solution by Phone	Peter Wayne	
1954	John Wesley	Peter Bohler	
1955	A Prize of Gold	British Officer	
1957	Alive on Saturday	Slade	
1958	Moment of Indiscretion	Bryan	
1961	The Frightened City	T.V. Announcer	
1965	Curse of the Voodoo	Police Inspector	
1973	The Vault of Horror	Gaskill	(segment "Drawn and Quartered")
