= Saint-Benoît, Quebec =

Coordinates: 45°34′02″N 74°05′49″W

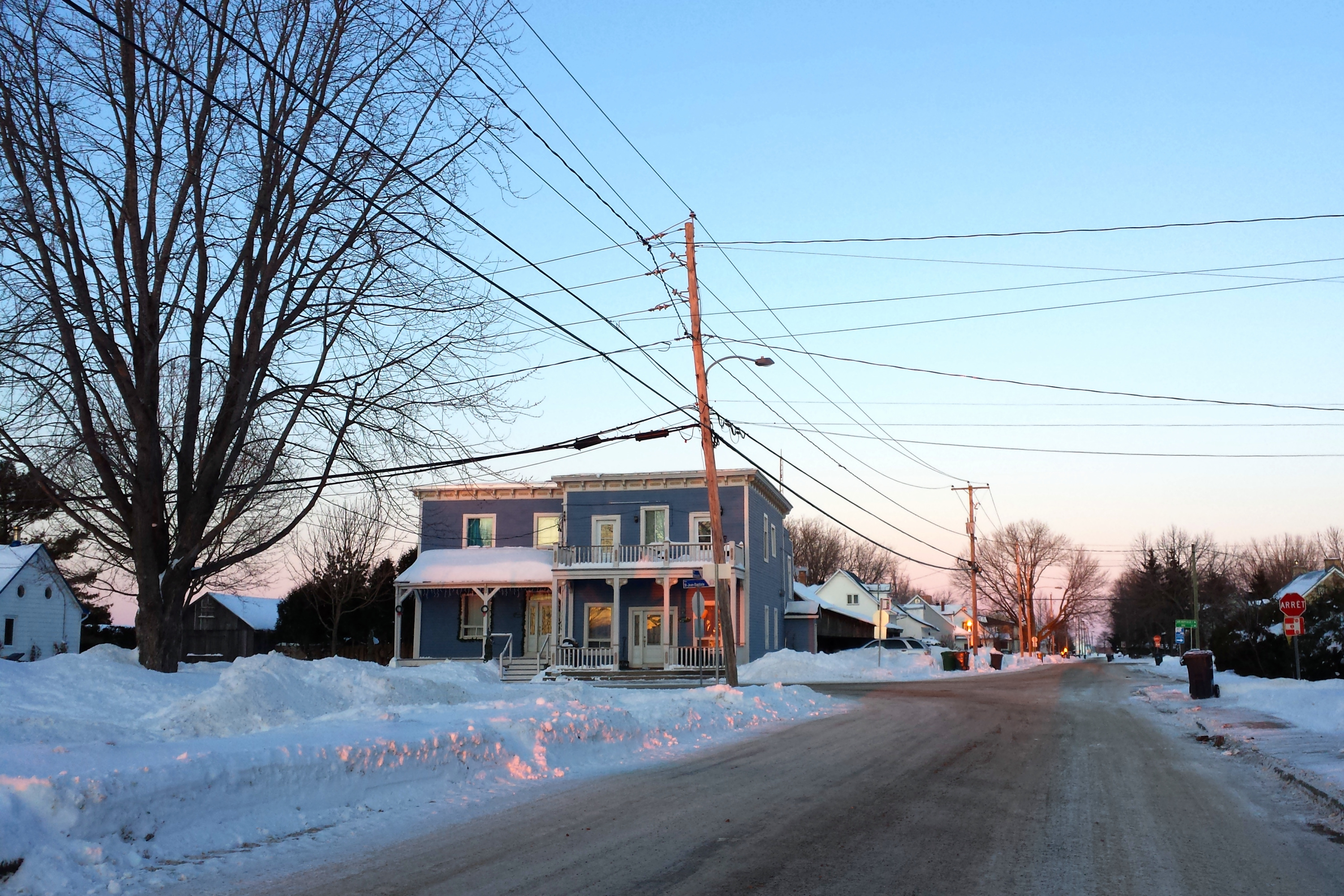

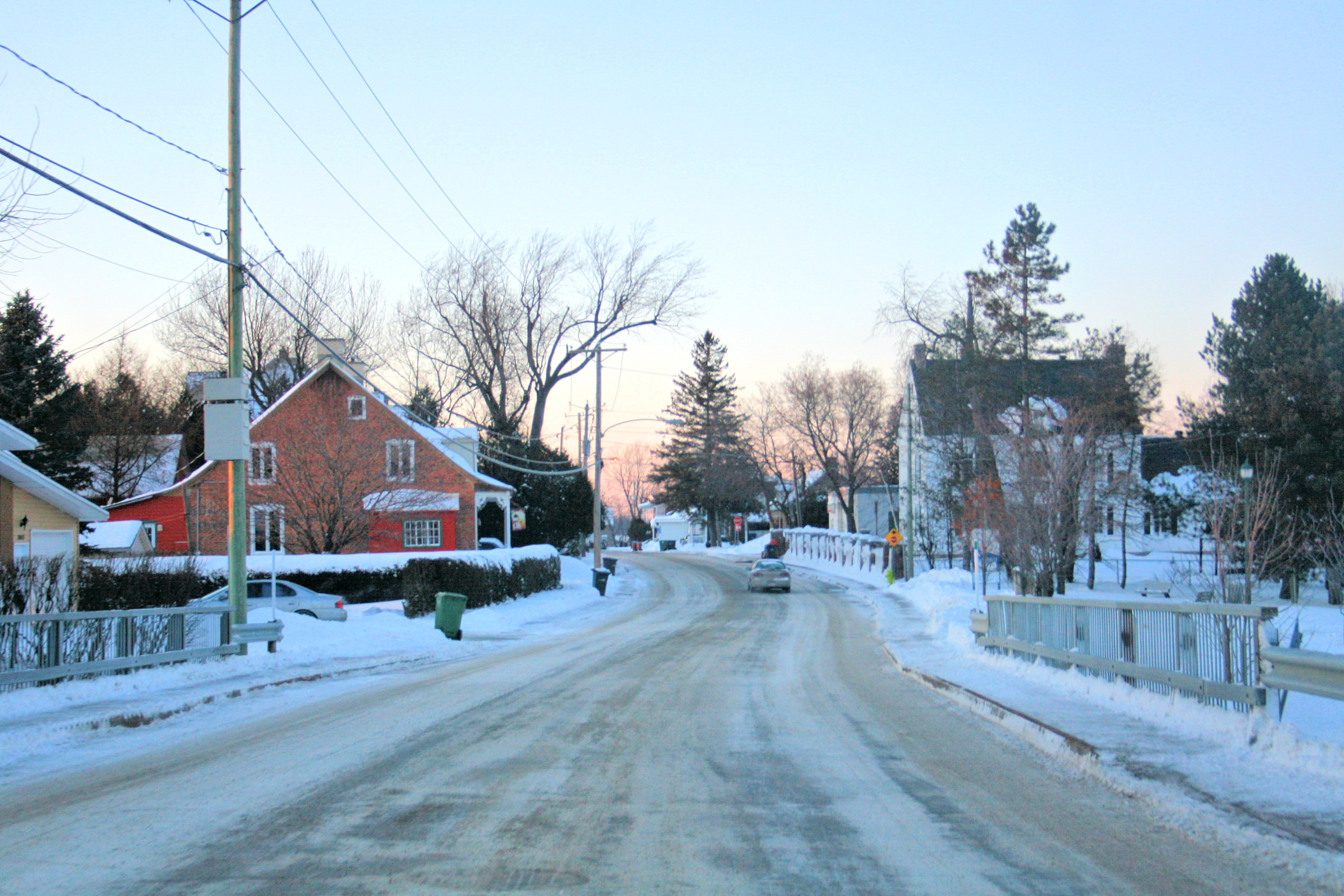

Saint-Benoît, Quebec was a municipality in Quebec until its amalgamation with neighbouring towns in 1971 to form the town of Sainte-Scholastique, which was renamed Mirabel in 1973. The village was named after Saint Benedict of Nursia (in French, Benoît).

== Notable people ==
- Jacques Labrecque, folk singer
- Rachel Laurin, Canadian organist, composer and educator
