= They Never Learn (film) =

1956 British film by Denis Kavanagh

- Directed by: Denis Kavanagh
- Screenplay by: Denis Kavanagh
- Starring: Adrienne Scott; Jackie Collins; John Blythe
- Cinematography: Hal Morey
- Edited by: Monica Kimick
- Music by: Jackie Brown
- Production company: E.J. Fancey Productions
- Release date: 27 September 1956
- Running time: 47 minutes
- Country: United Kingdom
- Language: English

They Never Learn is a 1956 British second feature ('B') black and white crime film directed and written by Denis Kavanagh and starring Adrienne Scott, Jackie Collins and John Blythe. It was made by E.J. Fancey Productions.

== Plot ==
In a mission to trap counterfeiter Lil Smith and her gang, policewoman Watson poses as a criminal, spending three months in Holloway Prison as a cover story. On her release, she joins Smith's mob, which includes Smith's boyfriend Frankie and his henchman Plum. She then collects evidence of the gang's crimes. Scotland Yard subsequently arrest Lil and Plum. Chased by the police, Frankie jumps to his death from a tower of Westminster Cathedral.

== Cast ==
- Adrienne Scott as WPC Watson
- Jackie Collins as Lil Smith
- John Blythe as Frankie
- Graham Stark as "Plum" Duff
- Ken Hayward as The Dropper
- Robert Vince as Paul "Charles" Dubesque
- Michael Partridge as Leon Becker
- John Crowhurst as Mickey
- Diana Chesney as Inspector

== Production ==
The film was made on a very low budget, and several scenes were shot in producer E.J. Fancey's office. John Grant wrote, in the annexe to his A Comprehensive Encyclopedia of Film Noir (2013): "One oddity is that the sound effects have clearly been added separately. All the dialogue, too, has been very obviously dubbed on afterwards, and not especially adroitly. (It gives the impression, in fact, of having been recorded in a bathroom)."

== Reception ==
The Monthly Film Bulletin wrote: "A rather makeshift 'quota' production, determinedly stereotyped in plot and conception. The playing is average, with Graham Stark bringing a degree of freshness to the role of Plum."

Kine Weekly wrote: "The players, with few exceptions, lack polish, and the direction and technical presentation also leave something to be desired. There is, however, no waste of footage, and many of its punches, although wild, land. ... The picture, which keeps on the move, visits West End and Parisian night clubs, Longchamps racecourse and the Harringay dog track, but neither its constant change of scene nor its spectacular death fall highlight lift it clear of the rut. Adrienne Scott convinces as Watson, John Blythe looks the part as spiv Frankie, and Jackie Collins registers as Lil, but the rest let the side down. The photography, too, is uneven; yet, despite its shortcomings, the film delivers a number of hefty clouts. Its pugilistic approach commends it to the cap and muffler trade."

Picture Show wrote: "It has plenty of realistic detail and action."

In British Sound Films: The Studio Years 1928–1959 David Quinlan rated the film as "poor", writing: "Rudimentary quota quickie, a throwback to the 1930s."
