= Cardew Robinson =

British comic performer (1917–1992)

- Born: Douglas John Cardew Robinson; 14 August 1917; Goodmayes, Essex, England
- Died: 28 December 1992 (aged 75); Roehampton, London, England
- Occupation: Comedy actor

Douglas John Cardew Robinson (14 August 1917 – 28 December 1992) was a British comic whose career was rooted in the music hall and Gang Shows.

== Early life and career ==
Born in Goodmayes, Essex, Robinson was educated at Harrow County School for Boys. He enjoyed acting in school productions and loved the books of Frank Richards, featuring Billy Bunter of Greyfriars and the weekly magazine The Gem with the adventures of Ralph Reckness Cardew of St Jim's. In the early 1930s, while at Harrow County School, he wrote for the school magazine, The Gaytonian, using the pseudonym Hotbreaks.

On leaving school, Robinson took a job with a local newspaper, but it folded and he then joined Joe Boganny's touring Crazy College Boys, which opened at the Lyric Theatre, Hammersmith, London. However, Robinson knew that he required a more traditional training, and went into repertory theatre where one of his roles was as the monster in an adaptation of Frankenstein. It was while serving in the RAF during the Second World War that he created his 'Cardew the Cad of the School' character. Promoted to flight-sergeant and put in charge of the show, Robinson toured France, Belgium and the Netherlands.

After the war, he appeared with the commercial production of the Gang Show in variety theatres. Robinson began working in variety; he also played the Cad character on radio and stage. Later he played the character in a film, Fun at St. Fanny's. 'Cardew the Cad' became a cartoon strip in Radio Fun, a children's comic of the period.

== Television, films and theatre ==
Robinson had appeared in films as early as 1938, starting in a short in the series Ghost Tales Retold and following it ten years later with A Piece of Cake starring Cyril Fletcher. Robinson successfully made the transition from variety and radio into TV and films. In the latter, he nearly always played small but memorable cameo parts; thus, an early theatrical review mentioned "Mr Cardew Robinson, who seems to specialise in grotesques". Unusually, in the 1956 film Fun at St Fanny's he had one of the main roles, playing himself and received second to top billing.

One of his last appearances on television was in an episode of Last of the Summer Wine, in which Robinson, by then in his 70s, played a hen-pecked husband led astray by Compo and Clegg. He also appeared as a Second World War veteran turned priest in an episode of Hancock's Half Hour. When Hancock was holding a reunion of his old Army friends, Robinson was the only one who appeared not to have become staid and boring, but when he took off his scarf, it was seen that he had become a vicar.

In the production of Camelot in London in 1964, Robinson played King Pellenore. The show apparently ran for 650 performances, although it was not well received by the critics. The same year, Robinson's television work included the series Fire Crackers, featuring the day-to-day challenges and mishaps of the Cropper's End Fire Brigade.

In 1967, he appeared in The Avengers episode entitled "The 50,000 Pound Breakfast" as a Minister.

He was a guest of Jack Howarth in the November 1974 episode of This Is Your Life.

Robinson was best known in Britain for appearances on television and radio shows such as You've Got to be Joking, which he created, as well as Does the Team Think?. He acted in one Carry On film, Carry On Up the Khyber, playing a fakir, and drawing a memorable line from Bernard Bresslaw, whose character, Bungdit Din, tells him "Fakir...off!".

== Personal life and death ==
Robinson died of ischemic colitis in London on 27 December 1992 at the age of 75. His obituary in The Times, described him as "a quiet studious man, whose private face belied his public appearance". A letter to the paper from a later headmaster of his old school, talked about his "generous spirit". He had divorced before he died, but had two daughters, Leanne and Lindy.

== Selected filmography ==
- A Piece of Cake (1948) – Honest Joe (uncredited)
- Calling All Cars (1954) – Reggie Ramsbottom
- Fun at St. Fanny's (1955) – Cardew the Cad
- Happy Is the Bride (1958) – George the Verger
- The Navy Lark (1959) – Lt. Binns
- I'm All Right Jack (1959) – Shop Steward
- Let's Get Married (1960) – Salesman
- Light Up the Sky! (1960) – Compere
- A French Mistress (1960) – Ambulance Attendant
- Three on a Spree (1961) – Micki
- Hair of the Dog (1962) – Doctor
- Crooks Anonymous (1962) – Wiseman – Helicopter Brother
- Waltz of the Toreadors (1962) – Midgley the Undertaker
- Go Kart Go (1963) – Postman
- The Wrong Arm of the Law (1963) – Postman (uncredited)
- Heavens Above! (1963) – Tramp
- Ladies Who Do (1963) – Police Driver
- A Stitch in Time (1963) – Pinching Patient (uncredited)
- Father Came Too! (1963) – Fire Officer
- Hide and Seek (1964) – Constable
- Alfie (1966) – Gay Man in Pub (uncredited)
- I Was Happy Here (1966) - Gravedigger
- Three Bites of the Apple (1967) – Bernhard Hagstrom
- Smashing Time (1967) – Custard Pie Vicar
- The Avengers (1967) TV Series, Episode "The £50,000 Breakfast" – pet cemetery vicar
- Carry On Up the Khyber (1968) – The Fakir
- Where's Jack? (1969) – Lord Mayor
- The Nine Ages of Nakedness (1969) – The Magistrate (segment "The Theatre")
- The Thirteen Chairs (1969) – Car Park Attendant
- The Magnificent Seven Deadly Sins (1971) – Guest Appearance (segment "Sloth")
- Come Play With Me (1977) – McIvar
- What's Up Nurse! (1978) – Ticket Inspector
- Pirates (1986) – Lawyer
- Shirley Valentine (1989) – Londoner
