= Hell Below Zero =

1954 film by Mark Robson

- Directed by: Mark Robson
- Written by: Richard Maibaum
- Screenplay by: Alec Coppel; Max Trell
- Based on: The White South by Hammond Innes
- Produced by: Irving Allen; Albert R. Broccoli
- Starring: Alan Ladd; Joan Tetzel; Basil Sydney; Stanley Baker
- Cinematography: John Wilcox
- Edited by: John D. Guthridge
- Music by: Clifton Parker
- Color process: Technicolor
- Production company: Warwick Films
- Distributed by: Columbia Pictures
- Release dates: 13 January 1954 (London); 16 July 1954 (US)
- Running time: 91 minutes
- Countries: United Kingdom; United States
- Language: English
- Budget: £247,512 plus key fees
- Box office: $1.7 million

Hell Below Zero is a 1954 British-American adventure film directed by Mark Robson and starring Alan Ladd, Joan Tetzel, Basil Sydney and Stanley Baker. It was written by Alec Coppel and Max Trell based on the 1949 novel The White South by Hammond Innes, and presents interesting footage of whaling fleets in action. It was the second of Ladd's films for Warwick Films.

== Plot ==
Captain Nordahl, an associate in a Norwegian whaling company, Bland-Nordahl, is on a factory ship Southern Harvester in Antarctic waters, when he is lost overboard.

Duncan Craig, an American, meets Judie Nordahl, the captain's daughter on his way to South Africa, where he gets even with a business partner who cheated him. With little money left and a desire to see Judie again, Craig signs on to be a mate on the ship taking Judie to Antarctica.

On arrival in Antarctic waters, Craig finds suspicious evidence that seems to implicate skipper Erik Bland, the new captain of the factory ship, in a conspiracy. Another murder follows and the film concludes with a dramatic showdown on the ice.

== Cast ==
- Alan Ladd as Duncan Craig
- Joan Tetzel as Judie Nordhal
- Basil Sydney as Bland
- Stanley Baker as Erik Bland
- Joseph Tomelty as Capt. McPhee
- Niall MacGinnis as Dr. Howe
- Jill Bennett as Gerda Petersen
- Peter Dyneley as Miller
- Susan Rayne as Kathleen
- Philo Hauser as Sandeborg
- Ivan Craig as Larsen
- Paddy Ryan as Manders
- Cyril Chamberlain as Factory Ship Radio Operator
- Paul Homer as Kista Dan Radio Operator
- Edward Hardwicke as Ulvik
- John Witty as Martens
- Brandon Toomey as Christiansen
- Genine Graham as Stewardess
- Basil Cunard as Office Manager
- Fred Griffiths as Drunken Sailor
- John Warren as Hotel Receptionist
- Philip Ray as Capt. Petersen
- Paul Connell as Svensen
- Glyn Houston as Borg

== Production ==
The movie was based on a 1949 British novel The White South by Hammond Innes. Film rights were obtained by Warwick Productions who had a deal with Columbia Pictures to make films in Britain.

The movie was the second in a two-picture deal Ladd made with Warwick Films, following The Red Beret. (He also made The Black Knight for Warwick.) Ladd's fee was $200,000 against 10% of the profits.

During production the film was also known as White South and White Mantle. Director Mark Robson wanted Eugene Pallette to play a role but Pallette was unhappy with the size of the part in the script. Stanley Baker, who had been in The Red Beret with Ladd, was brought back for Hell Below Zero.

Shooting took place at Pinewood Studios near London in addition to location footage shot in Antarctic waters. Albert Broccoli accompanied a second unit crew down there for over three months. The film's sets were designed by the art director Alex Vetchinsky.

According to one report the film had a budget of approximately $1 million. Records revealed the final budget was £247,512 plus the fees of Ladd, Broccoli and Allen, screenwriter Maibaum and the director.

The makers of a sound documentary called Hell Below Zero sued the filmmakers for $1.5 million in damages.

== Release ==
The film was launched in Britain with what Variety called "slambang, saturation technique" of marketing.

== Reception ==
=== Critical ===
Variety called the film "a vigorous action drama which should play sturdy dividends at the box office."

=== Box office ===
According to Kinematograph Weekly the film was a "money maker" at the British box office in 1954. Variety estimated its North American rentals at $1.7 million.
