= Solution by Phone =

1954 British film by Alfred Travers

- Directed by: Alfred Travers
- Written by: Brandon Fleming
- Produced by: Brandon Fleming; Geoffrey Goodheart
- Starring: Clifford Evans; Thea Gregory; John Witty
- Cinematography: Hilton Craig
- Edited by: Carmen Beliaeff
- Production company: Pan Productions
- Distributed by: Associated British-Pathé
- Release date: 11 January 1954
- Running time: 60 minutes
- Country: United Kingdom
- Language: English

Solution by Phone is a 1954 British second feature ('B') crime film directed by Alfred Travers and starring Clifford Evans, Thea Gregory and Georgina Cookson. The screenplay by Brendon Fleming concerns an actor who seeks help from a crime novelist in his attempts to dispose of a body. It was shot at Brighton Studios with sets designed by the art director Don Russell.

== Cast ==
- Clifford Evans as Richard Hanborough
- Thea Gregory as Ann Selby
- John Witty as Peter Wayne
- Georgina Cookson as Frances Hanborough
- Enid Hewitt as Mrs. Garner
- Geoffrey Goodheart as Inspector Kirby
- Max Brimmell as Sgt. Woods

== Reception ==
The Monthly Film Bulletin wrote: "The playing of Clifford Evans and Geoffrey Goodhart is suitably restrained, but the same cannot be said for John Witty and Georgina Cookson, and Thea Gregory gives rather a wooden performance as Ann."

Kine Weekly wrote: "Its tale ... is quite ingenious, but the players, apart from Clifford Evans, smooth and efficient in the lead, fall short of demands. So does the director. Stagy and only mildly exciting, it limits its own market. Very very moderate quota 'second'."

Picturegoer wrote: "The whole thing falls incredibly flat."

In British Sound Films: The Studio Years 1928–1959 David Quinlan rated the film as "mediocre", writing: "Ingenious plot, but poorly done."

Chibnall and McFarlane in The British 'B' Film call the film "somewhat far-fetched."
