= Joe Boganny =

British comedy performer & acrobat (1874-1943)

- Born: Joseph Clifton; 7 February 1874; Liverpool, England
- Died: 29 July 1943 (aged 69); Kensington, London
- Other names: Joseph Toledano; Joseph Lazarus
- Occupations: Comedian, acrobat, talent manager
- Website: joeboganny.co.uk

Joe Boganny (born Joseph Clifton; 7 February 1874 – 29 July 1943), also known as Joseph Toledano or Joseph Lazarus, was a British comedy performer and acrobat who led The Boganny Troupe, popular in early 20th century music hall and variety shows for their knockabout comedy and Risley act.

== Life and career ==
He was born in Liverpool, the son of renowned clown and gymnast Frank Clifton (also known as Frank Riley; 1842–1904), who generally used the stage name Raslus, and Sarah Toledano (née Daniels; 1839–1902). He started working as a young child in his family's circus act, and then joined with his brother Joshua and half-brother Abraham "Alf" Alvarez as an acrobatic troupe, the Three Cliftons (also known as the Clifton Brothers, and under a variety of other names), often performing in formal evening dress. The troupe toured internationally before splitting up in 1900, and Joe Clifton took on the name Boganny.

The Boganny Troupe first performed in 1901 and became well known for their slapstick and acrobatic routine, "The Lunatic Bakers" (also known as "Fun in a Bakehouse"), which they performed for over twenty years. Membership of the troupe changed over time but generally included Boganny's children as well as midgets and a dog. They also performed other routines such as "The Opium Fiends" and "Crazy College Boys". The troupe performed regularly in London and toured in Britain, the United States and Australia. In 1907, they appeared at the first of several Royal Command Performances, before Edward VII and later George V. The troupe continued to perform into the 1930s, when one member was the entertainer Cardew Robinson. Joe's son Sam (1894–1961), who had been a member of the troupe, became a successful solo comedian under the name Sam Linfield. Joe's stepson Cyril Boganny (1899–1954) also set up his own troupe.

Joe Boganny died in 1943, in Kensington, London, at the age of 69, and was buried at East Ham Jewish Cemetery.
