= Max Brimmell =

British actor (1920–1997)

Max Brimmell (25 June 1920 in London – 17 February 1997 in Sussex) was a British actor.

The death of 'Max Brimmell' is reported in the Hastings Observer 19feb1993 p12.

== Filmography ==
Year	Title	Role	Notes
1950	Hangman's Wharf	Krim	
1954	Solution by Phone	Sgt. Woods	
1954	Eight O'Clock Walk	Joe	
1955	The Hornet's Nest	Staines	
1956	X: The Unknown	Hospital Director	Uncredited
1958	Grip of the Strangler	Newgate Prison Turnkey	
1958	A Question of Adultery	Photographer	
1958	Blood of the Vampire	Warder	
1960	Beyond the Curtain	Russian Guard	Uncredited
1961	Dangerous Afternoon	Doctor Spalding	
