= Genine Graham =

English actress (1926–1997)

- in Scotland Yard (1961)
- Born: 9 December 1926; London, England
- Died: 11 May 1997 (aged 70); London, England
- Occupation: Actress
- Spouse: John Witty

Genine Graham (9 December 1926 – 11 May 1997) was an English actress. She trained at LAMDA, and played the title role of the mermaid Miranda in the original West End production of Peter Blackmore's play, later filmed with Glynis Johns. She also appeared on Broadway opposite Katharine Hepburn in a revival of Bernard Shaw's The Millionairess in 1952; and presented the TV series Mail Call (1955–56) with her husband John Witty.

== Filmography ==
Year	Title	Role	Notes
1948	Idol of Paris	Barucci	
1949	Murder at the Windmill	Usherette	
1950	Hangman's Wharf	Alison Maxwell	
1950	Old Mother Riley Headmistress	Girl	
1953	Black 13	Stella	
1954	Hell Below Zero	Stewardess	
1954	Phantom Caravan	Rita Vallon	
1954	Dangerous Cargo	Diana	
1955	The Woman for Joe	Hairdresser's Manageress	Uncredited
1955	Count of Twelve	Julia Graves	(episode "The Count of Twelve")
1957	Scotland Yard (film series) - The Tyburn Case	Miss Bradley	
1958	Scotland Yard (film series) - The Cross Roads Gallows	Sally	
1961	Scotland Yard (film series) - The Never Never Murder	Mrs Bennet	
1962	Time to Remember	Mrs. Johnson	
1973	The Vault of Horror	Female Customer	(segment "Midnight Mess"), Uncredited, (final film role)
