= Jacques Labrecque =

Canadian folklorist, singer and publisher

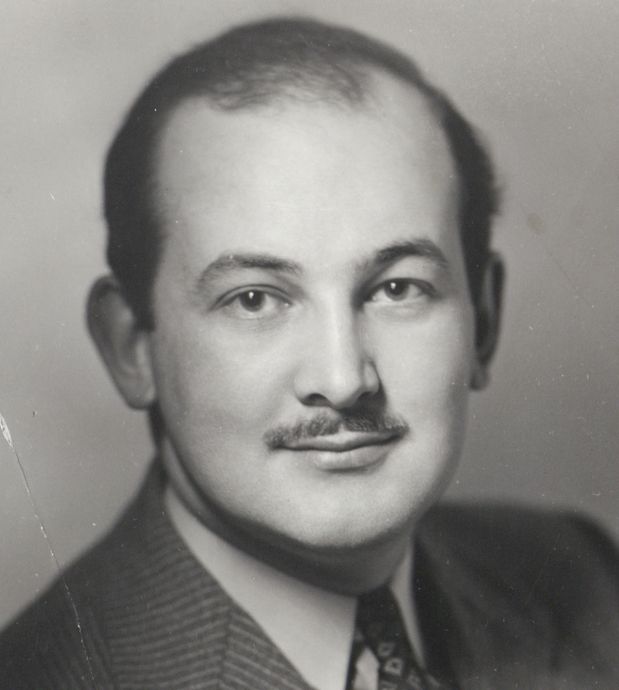
- Born: June 8, 1917; Saint-Benoît, Quebec, Canada
- Died: March 18, 1995 (aged 77); Longueuil, Quebec, Canada
- Occupations: Folk singer, Storyteller, Ethnologist, Actor, Producer, Publisher
- Notable work: "La parenté" (1957)

Joseph Marcel Jacques Labrecque (8 June 1917 – 18 March 1995) was a Québécois folk singer, storyteller, ethnologist, actor, producer and publisher.

== Biography ==
Jacques Labrecque was born on 8 June 1917 in Saint-Benoît, Quebec to Charles Labrecque, a farmer, and Berthe Rhéaume. He was baptized on the tenth and given the name Joseph Marcel Jacques Labrecque.

Labrecque started singing on his parents' farm. He was taught in Montreal by Céline Marier, Henri Pontbriand and Roger Filiatrault. Oscar O'Brien taught him harmony and Marie-Thérèse Paquin taught him his French repertoire.

He made his debut at 17 as a tenor; he sung popular songs on Radio-Canada programs "Le Réveil Rural". In 1937 he played the role of Rigobert in Varney's Les mousquetaires au couvent at the Variétés lyriques. He signed a three-year contract with the National Concerts and Artists of New York in 1946 and toured Acadia.

In 1949, Jacques Labrecque represented Canada at an international folklore festival in Venise. From 1951 to 1956, he stayed in Europe and gave concerts of classical and folk music. He returned to Montreal and founded the Musicana record company. In addition to folk songs, he also performed songs from newer composers, thus making them known to a wider public. In 1957, he recorded his first major success: "La Parenté" by Jean-Paul Filion. By 1955, he was a member of the Société d'ethnographie francaise.

During the 1960s, Labrecque was known as the greatest folklorist of Québec. He won a trophy for the best folk recording of 1960 at the Grand prix du disque of CKAK. He gave multiple concerts abroad. He opened the restaurant Chez Jacques Labrecque with his wife Pauline on Stanley Street, Montreal in the mid-1960s.

After a tour with the Jeunesses Musicales Canada in 1970–1971, he returned to Paris on a grant from the French government and gave recitals in France and other countries. He taught folk songs to students in psychomotor re-education at the University of Paris VI.

He returned to Québec in 1975 and retired to the Éboulements, Charlevoix. He hosted the Radio-Canada series of half-hour programs "Chansons voltigeantes... chansons dolentes" in summer 1976. He performed at the Grand Théâtre de Québec in December 1979. In the 1980s, he started directing the Éditions et Disques Patrimoine. He managed the Galerie du patrimoine in Éboulements which exhibits painters and documents related to the region. He hosted "Veillées de contes espéciales" there for tourists.

Labrecque was hospitalized due to diabetes at the Pierre-Boucher Hospital of Longueuil and died there from an heart attack on 18 March 1995.

== Discography ==
Singles
| Year | Title |
|---|---|
| 1949 | À la claire fontaine/Le fils du roi s'en va chassant |
| 1949 | Ah toi belle hirondelle/Alouette |
| 1949 | Les raftmen–Monsieur le curé/Je sais bien quelque chose |
| 1949 | C'est la belle Françoise/Son voile qui volait |
| 1949 | Gorloton glin glon/ Dans Paris, il y a une brume |
| 1949 | Quand j'étais chez mon père–Isabeau s'y promène/L'Escaouette–Apprenti |
| 1950 | Le jupon de Lison/Ma chanson |
| 1950 | Si si si/Chérie, sois fidèle |
| 1950 | La colline aux oiseaux/Pour t'aimer |
| 1953 | Partons la mer est belle/Les raftmen |
| 1953 | Trente marins de Saint-Malo/Dans ma forêt |
| 1953 | Mon Saint-Laurent/La ronde des provinces |
| 1956? | Across Canada in Songs, Part 3: Québec |
| 1956 | Le miracle des cloches/Nature Boy |
| 1956 | Les trois cloches |
| 1957 | La parenté/Monsieur Guindon |
| 1958 | The Relatives(La parenté)/ Road to Grand-mère |
| 1958 | L'habitant de Saint-Benoît/En p'tit boggy |
| 1958 | Gondolier/Su'l chemin des habitants |
| 1958 | Le miracle de Saint-Anne-de-Beaupré/Ave Maria |
| 1959 | Des mitaines pas d'pouces/Le temps des Fêtes |
| 1959 | Jos Hébert/Jos Montferrand |
| 1960 | Monsieur Cinquante/L'abattage |
| 1960 | Le temps du Carnaval/La bastringue du Carnaval |
| 1960 | Emmenez-en d'la pitoune/Le grand Joe |
| 1961 | Le garçon du grand Paulin/Kino le trappeur |
| 1961 | Les gens/Couleurs d'automne |
| 1962 | Comment ça va/Les présentations |
| 1962 | J'suis v'nu au Carnaval/Les Québécoises |
| 1980 | Le temps des fêtes |

Albums
| Year | Title |
|---|---|
| 1950 | French Operetta Airs |
| 1953? | Chansons populaires du Canada |
| 1953 | Le Canada chante pour vous |
| 1957 | Chansons populaires de France et du Canada |
| 1958 | La parenté est arrivée |
| 1959 | L'inimitable Jacques Labrecque |
| 1959 | Noël et Carillons/French Christmas Songs & Chimes |
| 1959 | Rappel:Labrecque/Desrochers/De Courval |
| 1959 | Carnaval à Québec avec Jacques Labrecque |
| 1960 | Jacques Labrecque en France |
| 1960 | French Folk Songs From Canada |
| 1961 | On va t'y n'avoir du plaisir |
| 1967 | Chansons folkloriques du Canada |
| 1967 | Folklore du Canada |
| 1980 | Jacques Labrecque |
| 1981 | Jacques Labrecque chante Gilles Vigneault |
| 1983 | Géographie sonore du Québec: Charlevoix |
| 1984 | Géographie sonore du monde de la mer |
| 1986 | Chansons traditionnelles avec Jacques Labrecque |

== Filmography ==
| Year | Title | Role | Ref. |
|---|---|---|---|
| 1950 | Soho Conspiracy | Carlo Scala | |
| 1958 | Pays neufs | | |
| 1959 | Pasaporte al infierno | | |
| 1963 | Amanita Pestilens | Henri Martin | |
