= Mad About Opera =

1948 film

- Directed by: Mario Costa
- Written by: Mario Costa; Mario Monicelli; Giovanna Soria; Steno
- Produced by: Maleno Malenotti; Cesare Zanetti
- Starring: Gino Bechi; Gina Lollobrigida; Carlo Campanini
- Cinematography: Mario Bava
- Edited by: Otello Colangeli
- Music by: Felice Montagnini
- Production company: Scalera Film
- Distributed by: Scalera Film
- Release date: 10 August 1948
- Running time: 94 minutes
- Country: Italy
- Language: Italian

Mad About Opera (Italian: Follie per l'opera) is a 1948 Italian musical comedy film directed by Mario Costa and starring Gino Bechi, Gina Lollobrigida, and Carlo Campanini. It was shot at the Scalera Studios in Rome. The film's sets were designed by the art director Piero Filippone. Footage from the film was late re-incorporated in the 1950 British film Soho Conspiracy.

== Plot ==
In order to raise funds to rebuild a Catholic church in Covent Garden which had been destroyed in The Blitz, a journalist organises a benefit performance with major opera stars appearing.

== Cast ==
- Gino Bechi as Gino
- Gina Lollobrigida as Dora Scala
- Carlo Campanini as Carlo Scala
- Constance Dowling as Margaret Jones
- Aroldo Tieri as Guido Marchi
- Aldo Silvani as Don Antonio Capenna
- Lamberto Picasso as McLean
- Franca Marzi as Carmen
- Guglielmo Barnabò as Covent Garden Director
- Nico Pepe as Carlo Scala's Friend
- Michele Riccardini as Carlo Scala's Friend
- Luigi Almirante as Notary
- Arturo Bragaglia as Waiter
- Franco Pesce as Gennarino
- Enrico Luzi as Opera Fanatic
- Achille Majeroni as Mr. Brown
- Franco Mannino as The Pianist
- Beniamino Gigli as Himself
- Maria Caniglia as Herself
- Tito Schipa as Himself
- Tito Gobbi as Himself
