= Gino Bechi =

Italian opera singer (1913–1993)

- Gino Bechi (photo with dedication)
- Born: 16 October 1913; Florence, Italy
- Died: 2 February 1993 (aged 79); Florence, Italy
- Occupation: Opera singer (Baritone)

Gino Bechi (16 October 1913 – 2 February 1993) was an Italian operatic baritone, particularly associated with the Italian repertory, especially in Verdi roles.

== Life and career ==
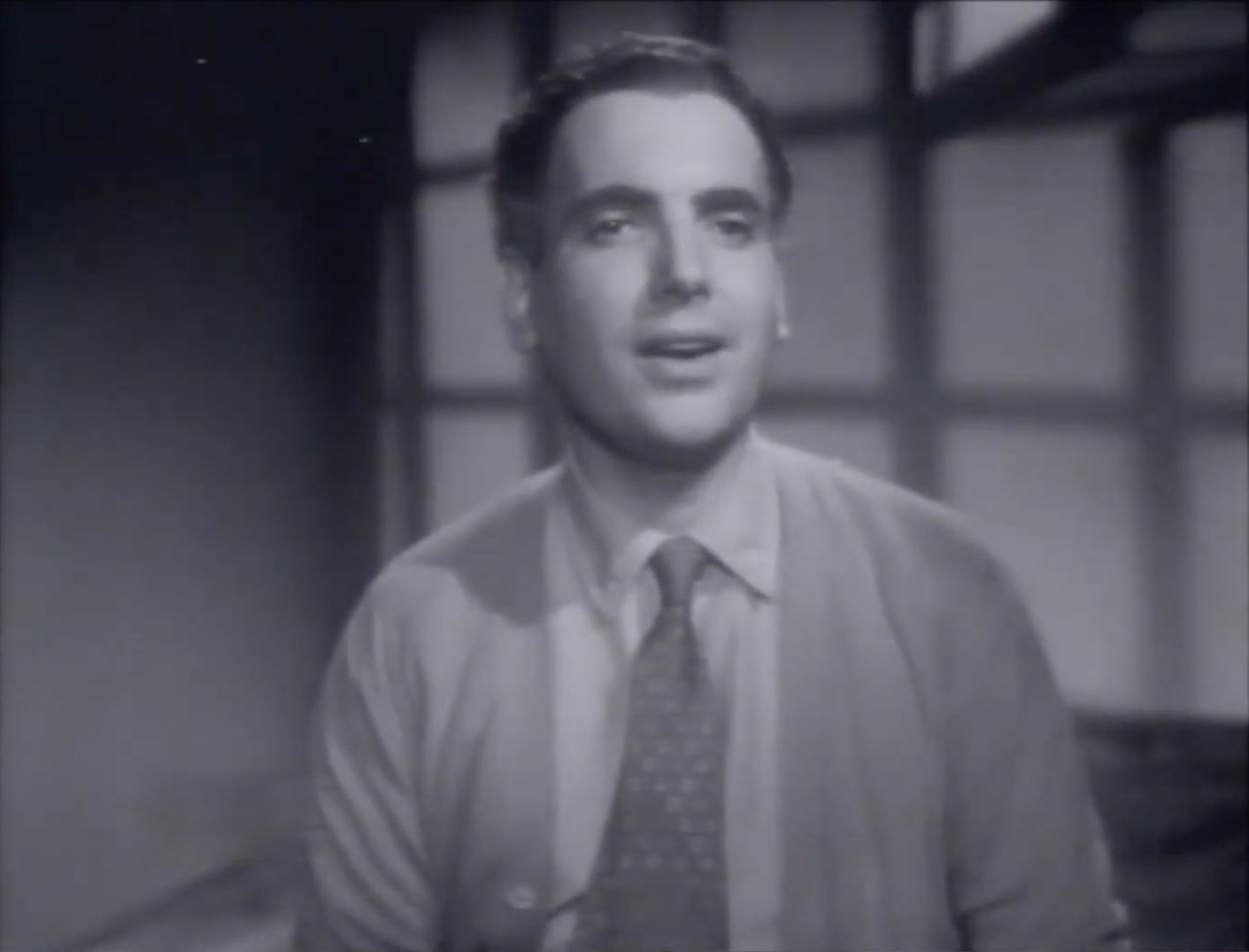
Bechi in Music on the Run (1943)

Bechi studied in his native Florence with Raul Frazzi and di Giorgio, and made his debut at Empoli, in 1936, as Germont in La traviata.

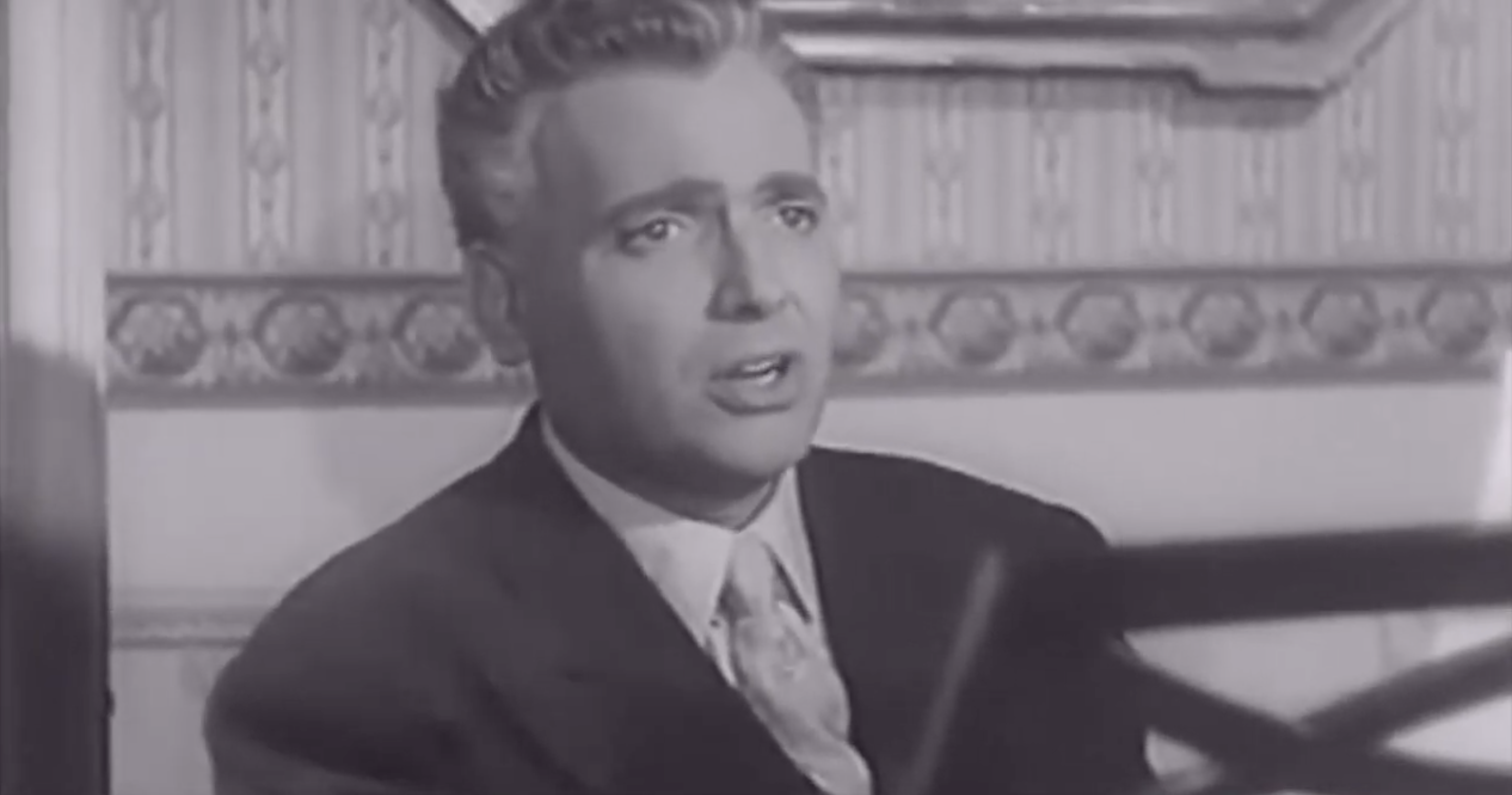
Bechi in Little Lady (1949)

He sang widely in Italy, appearing frequently at the Rome Opera from 1938 to 1952, and at La Scala from 1939 to 1953, where he sang the title role in Nabucco for its reopening in 1946.

He quickly established himself as the leading dramatic baritone of his time, in roles such as Rigoletto, Count de Luna, Renato, Carlo, Amonasro, Alfio, Gérard, but was also admired as Figaro and Hamlet.

Bechi sang relatively little outside Italy, but did appear in England and North and South America in the late 1950s; but by then, he was past his best.

In his prime, Bechi possessed a dark and incisive voice and was a fine singing actor. He can be heard in a number of early recordings, opposite Beniamino Gigli, such as Un ballo in maschera, Aida, Andrea Chénier, and Cavalleria rusticana, conducted by Pietro Mascagni himself. He also recorded Il barbiere di Siviglia. Also available is an unauthorized recording of Nabucco, with Maria Callas, from 1949, and the Prologue from Pagliacci.

Bechi retired from the stage in 1965 and taught in Siena. He died in Florence in 1993.

== Selected filmography ==
- Music on the Run (1943)
- Be Seeing You, Father (1948)
- Mad About Opera (1948)
- Little Lady (1949)

== Videography ==
- Verdi – La traviata – Anna Moffo, Franco Bonisolli, Gino Bechi – Giuseppe Patanè (1968), VAI

== Sources ==
- Le guide de l'opera, les indispensables de la musique, R. Mancini & J-J. Rouvereux, (Fayard, 1986), ISBN 2-213-01563-5
