= Calling All Cars (1954 film) =

British film by Maclean Rogers

- Opening titles
- Directed by: Maclean Rogers
- Written by: Charles Robinson
- Produced by: E. J. Fancey
- Starring: Spike Milligan; Cardew Robinson; John Fitzgerald; Adrienne Scott
- Cinematography: S.D. Onions
- Edited by: Monica Kimick
- Release date: 1954
- Running time: 43min
- Country: United Kingdom
- Language: English

Calling All Cars is a 1954 British short second feature ('B') black and white film directed by Maclean Rogers and starring Spike Milligan (voice only), Cardew Robinson and John Fitzgerald.

The film is a mixture of semi-documentary about the port of Dover and a comedy about two young men who decide to chat up two girls and follow them to Dover in an old taxicab.

== Plot ==
Reggie Ramsbottom is smitten with local girl Beryl Grant, although he hardly knows her. Told that she is planning a car holiday on the Continent with her sister, Reggie and his friend Tom Lester decide to follow them in an ancient second-hand taxi.

== Cast ==
- Spike Milligan as Freddie, the taxi (voice)
- Cardew Robinson as Reggie Ramsbottom
- John Fitzgerald as Tom Lester
- Adrienne Scott as Beryl Grant
- Pauline Olsen as Marjorie Grant
- Margot Bryant as Mrs. Flit
- Gloria Brett as Mavis Grant

== Production ==
En route to Dover, Beryl and Marjorie stop for tea at the former "Fantail" restaurant building in Locksbottom, Bromley.

== Critical reception ==
The Monthly Film Bulletin wrote: "This second feature wavers curiously between farce and sequences which look as though they were devised to publicise the Dover Harbour car terminal. A fairly lengthy section, accompanied by some painfully facetious cross-talk between Reggie and his friend, deals factually with the construction of the terminal; for the rest, the film provides some remarkably unamusing adventures on the Dover Road."

Kine Weekly wrote: "Unique, if unpretentious, comedy-cum-documentary, pivoting on the famous Dover Harbour car terminal. The leading characters are an assinine fellow, owner of a boneshaker, his pal and two attractive girls, and the crazy antics of the foursome keep its modest end up. ... The car ferry at Dover provides motorists with a particularly valuable amenity, and the cross-talk between the dude and his pal, appropriately illustrated, give some indication of the money and brains expended on the project. The introduction of the women prevents the detail and action from becoming too technical and also furnishes appropriate light relief. The acting is as good as the script permits and the cracks are not too 'chestnutty'."

Chibnall and McFarlane in The British 'B' Film called the film "a poor man's Genevieve (1953) filmed at the Dover Harbour car terminal."
