= Action Stations (film) =

1959 British-Spanish film by Cecil H. Williamson and Ramón Quadreny

- Spanish theatrical release poster
- Directed by: Cecil H. Williamson; Ramón Quadreny
- Screenplay by: Cecil H. Williamson; Enrique Lanfranco
- Story by: Edward Leversuch
- Produced by: E.J. Fancey; Cecil H. Williamson
- Starring: Paul Carpenter; Mary Martin; Joe Robinson
- Cinematography: Richard Hughes
- Edited by: Monica Kimick; Roy Smith
- Music by: Jackie Brown
- Production company: Aqua
- Release date: 9 April 1959
- Running time: 49 minutes
- Country: United Kingdom
- Language: English

Action Stations (also known as Pasaporte al infierno and East of Barcelona) is a 1959 British/Spanish co-production action drama film directed by Cecil H. Williamson (English language prints) and Ramón Quadreny (Spanish language prints) and starring Paul Carpenter, María Martín and Joe Robinson. It was filmed in 1956 but unreleased until 1959.

== Plot ==
Bob Reynolds and Pete Archer are smugglers ferrying contraband to Spanish ports in their small sailing ship. They meet Anna Braun, the daughter of a master engraver in hiding from a gang led by Kleivar, and decide to help her. When she is kidnapped Reynolds and Archer force one of the gang to reveal the location of their mountain headquarters. Kleivar and his gang meet their end when their car falls from a cliff.

== Cast ==
- Paul Carpenter as Bob Reynolds
- María Martín as Anna Braun (as Mary Martin)
- Joe Robinson as Pete Archer
- Ronald Leigh-Hunt as Kleivar (as Ronald Leigh Hunt)
- Douglas Robinson
- Kim Parker
- Colin Cleminson
- Gus Ray
- Sheena Marshe as night club girl (uncredited)
- Emilio Fábregas (uncredited)
- Juan Aymerich (uncredited)
- Jack Taylor (uncredited)
- Jacques Labrecque (uncredited)

== Critical reception ==
The Monthly Film Bulletin wrote: "A very minor "thick ear" melodrama, poorly acted and untidily scripted, with little but the authentic Spanish locale to recommend it."

In British Sound Films: The Studio Years 1928–1959 David Quinlan rated the film as "poor", writing: "Shoestring thriller, not released until 1959"

== Home media ==
Action Stations was released as part of The E.J. Fancey Collection compilation DVD (Renown Pictures).
