= Felice Montagnini =

Italian conductor and composer

- Born: 11 March 1902; Turin, Piedmont, Italy
- Died: 20 February 1966 (aged 63); Rome, Lazio, Italy
- Occupation: Composer
- Years active: 1931-1966 (film)

Felice Montagnini (1902–1966) was an Italian conductor and composer of film scores.

== Selected filmography ==
- The Charmer (1931)
- The Man with the Claw (1931)
- The Paw (1931)
- Unripe Fruit (1934
- I Don't Know You Anymore(1936)
- The Carnival Is Here Again (1937)
- Dora Nelson (1939)
- Two Million for a Smile (1939)
- Then We'll Get a Divorce (1940)
- The Secret Lover (1941)
- Happy Days (1942)
- The Taming of the Shrew (1942)
- Without a Woman (1943)
- Come Back to Sorrento (1945)
- Mad About Opera (1948)
- Eleven Men and a Ball (1948)
- The Emperor of Capri (1949)
- The Merry Widower (1950)
- My Beautiful Daughter (1950)
- Soho Conspiracy (1950)
- I'm the Capataz (1951)
- Toto in Color (1952)
- Husbands in the City (1957)
- Son of the Circus (1963)

== Bibliography ==
- Mancini, Elaine. Struggles of the Italian film industry during fascism, 1930-1935. UMI Research Press, 1985.
