= List of George and Mildred characters =

This is a list of characters from ITV's popular British sitcom George and Mildred which ran from 1976 until 1979, plus George and Mildred (film) which aired in 1980.

== Main characters ==
- Yootha Joyce as Mildred Roper
- Brian Murphy as George Roper

== Supporting characters ==
- Norman Eshley as Jeffrey Fourmile
- Sheila Fearn as Ann Fourmile
- Nicholas Bond-Owen as Tristram Fourmile
- Simon Lloyd as Tarquin Fourmile (from series 3)

== Recurring characters ==
- Avril Elgar as Ethel
- Reginald Marsh as Humphrey Pumphrey
- Roy Kinnear as Jerry
- Gretchen Franklin as Mildred's mother
- "Pussy Galore" as Truffles

== Character descriptions ==
=== Mildred Roper ===
Mildred is the long-suffering wife of George who is always getting on her nerves. Whether she buys a new hat or armchair, George is not bothered. It is hinted that she used to have many flings with men when she used to work at an airbase during the war. Mildred has a sister called Ethel, who is a snob and is disliked by George and many others. Mildred dislikes Jerry, George's best friend and odd-job man who is usually conning people. Most of the storylines for Mildred are for her trying to climb the social ladder, and with George ruining her attempts. In George and Mildred she makes friends with her neighbour Ann Fourmile (Sheila Fearn), who is married to the snobbish Jeffrey (Norman Eshley). When Mildred thinks of adopting a child, and George agrees, the person from the orphanage declares that the Ropers cannot adopt because they are too old. Feeling sorry for Mildred, George buys her a Yorkshire Terrier, Truffles, who becomes Mildred's pride and joy, and receives better attention than George himself.

=== George Roper ===
The dim, lazy husband of Mildred, George is either watching television, at the pub or somehow annoying Jeffrey Fourmile, who he detests. He is best mates with Jerry who usually does a very cheap and dodgy job when he is roped in to do work on the house. George has a pet budgie called Oscar and a goldfish called Moby. George and Mildred's relationship is strained and they suffer each other. Throughout the series, George's relatives often visit: his father and younger brother Charlie. When Charlie Roper visits, all names of the Roper siblings are revealed: Fred, Gloria, Betty, Bill, George, Charlie and Bill (it is stated that the second Bill was named after the first). When George's father Jack arrives, their relationship is put under a serious strain, but when he leaves everything returns to normal. When Mildred's sister Ethel and her husband, Humphrey arrive, George often runs away to the pub.

=== Jeffrey Fourmile ===
Jeffrey lives next door to George and Mildred; he is a snobbish estate agent and lives with his wife Ann. Ann and Mildred become good friends, but Jeffrey is frequently irritated by George, with their spats providing much of the show's humour. The Fourmiles have a young son, Tristram, who gets on well with George, much to the chagrin of Jeffrey. Jeffrey supports the Conservative Party and is head of the Parent Teacher Association at Tristram's school. Jeffrey is always trying to impress his neighbours by buying sports cars and criticising the lower classes—according to Ann, Jeffrey only buys the Financial Times just to impress the newsagent. The character was played by Norman Esher who had played Norman Tripp, the brother of Robin Tripp in Man About The House.

=== Ann Fourmile ===
Ann, who lives with her husband Jeffrey, son Tristram (and later also Tarquin) lives next door to George and Mildred Roper, at number 48 Peacock Crescent. She quickly befriends Mildred and does not dislike George, unlike her husband who absolutely detests him. Ann is portrayed as a warm, lovable character who manages the Fourmile household.

=== Tristram Fourmile ===
Tristram, the young son of Jeffrey and Ann, is a cheeky private-schoolboy whose hobbies include playing with his Action Man. He reads The Beano, watches Doctor Who every week, and often questions Ann and Jeffrey about sex (unintentionally); when he asks his mother where babies come from, she replies "Harrods baby department", to which he replies: "That's not what Michael at school said". Jeffrey, surprised, asks him what Michael at school said; Tristram replies: "You wouldn't believe me even if I told you". After Mildred asks what Ann's new baby will be called, Tristram replies, "My mum says that when she has had the baby, she is going to call it 'a day'".

=== Ethel Pumphrey ===
Ethel, the elder snobbish sister of Mildred, lives a life of luxury in her large mansion in Oxshott. Her husband Humphrey owns a meat company and is nicknamed 'The Offal King of Oxshott'. Ethel is always trying to show off her new 'presents' from Humphrey like her new Jaguar XJ6, diamond rings, yachts and most of all her massive fur coat collection. When trying to show up the size of Mildred's home, as it is tiny compared to theirs, Ethel always says "Oh, what a lovely small room" Mildred's usual response is to make subtle digs at Ethel's age such as "Well, none of us are getting any younger, except you".

=== Humphrey Pumphrey ===
Labelled 'The Offal King of Oxshott' by the Ropers, Humphrey owns a meat company and puts up with the snobbish Ethel as his wife. However he does enjoy himself when flirting with his buxom secretary (Jennifer Guy) at work. He once planned a holiday for the two of them in Jersey, but George let it slip and the idea was abandoned. When visiting George and Mildred, Mildred always sits Humphrey next to her lava lamp which makes him annoyed as it makes him feel queasy. Humphrey is a snob, but he is not as bad as Ethel.

=== Mildred's mother ===
The ageing 74-year-old mother of Mildred and Ethel lives in Dagenham. She gets things muddled up as she puts her hat on George and says hello to the hat stand. Her constant catchphrase, which she says in all of her appearances is 'I'm not longed for this world'.

=== Jerry ===
Jerry is an odd job man who is always persuaded by George, his best friend, to get him to do various jobs around the house that do not even need doing, like fitting new showers and mending letterboxes. He is disliked by all, apart from George, but especially by Mildred.
