= Mildred Roper =

- Man About the House and George and Mildred character
- First appearance: 15 August 1973 (Man About the House); 6 September 1976 (George and Mildred)
- Last appearance: 7 April 1976 (Man About the House); 25 December 1979 (George and Mildred)
- Created by: Johnnie Mortimer; Brian Cooke
- Portrayed by: Yootha Joyce

In-universe information
- Alias: Mildred Tremble (maiden name)
- Gender: Female
- Occupation: Airbase Canteen (during WW2); Hospital laundrywoman Housewife
- Family: Mr Tremble (father); Mrs Tremble (mother); Arthur Tremble (brother); Ethel Pumphrey (sister); Hilda (sister)
- Spouse: George Roper (m. 1953)
- Relatives: Jack Roper (father-in-law); Mary Roper (mother-in-law); Humphrey Pumphrey (brother-in-law); Fred (brother-in-law); Six nieces and nephews

Mildred Dorothy Roper (née Tremble) is a fictional character from the Thames Television sitcoms Man About the House and George and Mildred. She was portrayed by Yootha Joyce.

== Biography ==
Mildred Dorothy Tremble was born in London and had three siblings: Arthur, Ethel (Avril Elgar) and Hilda (Jean Marlow). Although her maiden name is given as Tremble, in the 1974 film Man About the House she is referred to as Mildred Askwith by the Doorman at Thames Television who turns out to be her wartime boyfriend Arthur Mulgrove.

Her eldest sibling was her only brother, Arthur Tremble, who had emigrated to New Zealand and was employed branding sheep; it is hinted that he was homosexual. He died in 1950. Her eldest sister, Ethel, married Humphrey Pumphrey (Reginald Marsh), and moved into a large mansion in Oxshott. Hilda, married a man called Fred, nicknamed 'Fertile Fred' by George and Humphrey, and had five unnamed children. During the Second World War, Mildred worked in the canteen at an airbase near London with Gladys (Eunice Black) and Kitty, and several others; Mildred had many boyfriends, including flight sergeant Lee Kennedy (Lionel Murton), army sergeant Arthur Mulgrove (Norman Mitchell) and many others including a ginger one, a tall one with a crew cut and one with a moustache.

After the war, Mildred had a fling with Charlie Roper (Peter Birrel) (with whom she went to the cinema to see Gone with the Wind on seven consecutive nights, but claims she still needs to see the film), who introduced her to his brother George Roper (Brian Murphy) who was wearing his gas mask at the time. Mildred married George in 1953, who was working as a bus conductor - a job he would hold for two weeks. Their wedding day was a disaster as when Mildred was walking up the aisle in her navy blue dress, George accidentally stepped on her bridal train and ripped it clean off. George wore his bus conductor's uniform for his wedding as he had come straight from work. All of George's fly buttons were undone and Mildred had to discreetly do them up at the altar as George was not sober. At the wedding reception, George was at the pub getting drunk to 'steady his nerves' and then put the ring on the vicar's finger. They honeymooned in Dunkirk but Mildred was let down by the weather, 'amongst other things'.

Shortly after, they moved to 6 Myddleton Terrace, Putney, where they owned a house of which they let out the two upper floors to Chrissy Plummer (Paula Wilcox), Jo (Sally Thomsett) and a young woman called Eleanor. After Eleanor leaves in 1973, Robin Tripp moves in, but George does not think it's morally appropriate to have a man sharing a flat with two women. Chrissy allays his fears by falsely telling George that Robin is gay.

When George and Mildred go to stay at her wealthy sister Ethel's house in 1974, the flatmates plan a party. But when George makes fun of Humphrey because he has lost his driving licence, Ethel and Humphrey ask them to leave. Upon arriving back home, the Ropers realise a party is happening and join in the fun, until they find out that George has parked awkwardly and is asked to move his car, where he is stopped by a policeman and is arrested for driving a car above the alcohol limit.

The flatmates throw a party for the Ropers' 21st wedding anniversary, and Robin invites his German friend Franz Wasserman (Dennis Waterman), a fellow cookery student, to come along. Unfortunately this sets off George's obsession with the Second World War, leading to a falling-out between the two men. One of a set of cuff-links bought as a present for George also goes missing and ends up in the food. Robin's friend Larry (Doug Fisher) moves into the flat but his slovenly ways and habit of pinching the others' food are not exactly endearing him as a house-mate. Then Mildred comes up with an excellent idea to clean out the attic and let him take it as his room. George was spending too much time up there anyway. While clearing it out, Chrissy finds some old love letters written by George to someone named 'Mil'. Robin, Chrissy and Jo assume these are to Mildred, but when they are presented to Mildred it is revealed by George that they were not to Mildred but to Millicent Briggs, who was Mildred's maid of honour at their wedding!

Chrissy and Jo are going to their staff dinner dance and Chrissy hasn't got a partner, so she decides that Robin should accompany her. Robin cannot dance, so is taught a few dance lessons by Mildred and given a dinner jacket from George. There's a mouse loose about the house and, though Larry kills it, Robin wants him to keep quiet about it as the girls are scared of the mouse and Robin can exploit their fear to get closer to Chrissy. George also wants to keep up the pretence that the mouse is still around to ward off a visit from Mildred's mother, which ultimately fails as they go to visit Mildred's mother instead of her visiting them. In 1975, it is revealed that in order to fiddle his tax returns, George has been claiming for a non-existent son for the past nineteen years, and is in danger of this being found out when a tax inspector is about to visit. There is only one thing for it: Robin will have to pose as George and Mildred's son to fool the inspector (Anthony Sharp). Chrissy receives two tickets for a Frank Sinatra concert, but doesn't want them. Instead, she enjoys being pampered by Jo and Robin as they compete for the tickets. Meanwhile, George buys Mildred a budgie for their 22nd wedding anniversary. He gives it to the tenants to look after so it remains a surprise for Mildred, but it escapes, so the tenants give George the concert tickets as a replacement present.

In February 1976, the youngsters want a party but George, recalling the last one, is against the idea. Mildred, however, is all for it and gives it her blessing. Unfortunately, come the night of the party, none of the guests show up; it turns out that George put a sign on the door saying the party was cancelled. This leads to more friction between the Ropers. Summer holiday brochures remind Chrissy, Jo and Robin that they're all looking rather pale and wan. And Mildred owns a sunray lamp - or at least she thought she did. Strangely enough, it disappears after Robin suddenly gets a tan. but George pinches it so they cannot use it. When Chrissy is to marry Robin's brother Norman, George tries to keep the Ropers' invitations from Mildred because he wants to go to a darts match instead and Mildred is furious when she finds out. Chrissy moves out and Robin and Jo shortly follow her. When the Ropers receive a compulsory purchase order from the council who wanted to knock down their house to make room for a flyover in 1976, they moved to 46 Peacock Crescent, Hampton Wick, next door to the Fourmile family: Jeffrey (Norman Eshley) Ann (Sheila Fearn), Tristram (Nicholas Bond-Owen) and later, baby Tarquin (Simon Lloyd).

After George and Mildred move into their new home, they are invited for a welcoming drink by the Fourmiles, but Jeffrey doesn't want them around by the time the Fourmiles' dinner guests arrive - the local Conservative MP (Diana King), and her husband (John Harvey). George doesn't want to go and has a rare bath instead. Unfortunately, when Mildred goes home, she finds George has accidentally locked them out and left the bathwater running. Mildred later gets a job as a secretary in Jeffrey's estate agency. George is thus the house husband but he is a disastrous cook and home-maker. Mildred is relieved when he finally gets a job, but less so when she discovers it is as a night-watchman, and he will be away all night; thankfully, he leaves the job soon after. Having baby-sat Tristram for Ann and Jeffrey while they go out for the night, Mildred is broody and wants a child of her own. George is less keen but is persuaded to apply for adoption. His crassness and the Ropers' age means that the adoption agency turns them down, but instead, George buys Mildred a Yorkshire Terrier called Truffles (Mildred later registers her with the kennel club as "Truffles duBorbon Fitzwilliam III"). When the Fourmiles go on holiday to Scotland, Mildred is given the key to their house so she can water their plants, but George abuses this by going in to watch the couple's superior colour television. Mildred has asked George to decorate their lounge but George calls in professionals - who follow him into the Fourmiles' house, wrongly assuming that this is where the re-decoration is needed. George and Mildred have to put the resultant unwanted make-over back to normal.

For the Ropers' 24th wedding anniversary in 1977, Mildred gives George a pipe and tobacco as a present. George gets her a carriage clock, which he bought for ten pounds from a man in the pub. Meanwhile, Jeffrey, Ann and Tristram get back from a golfing holiday to find they have been burgled, and one of the missing items is a carriage clock. Later on, initially opposed to George's idea of taking in a lodger to make more money, Mildred changes her mind when the charming salesman Edward Rogers (Derek Waring) turns up to rent their back bedroom for a month. Edward is everything George is not, charming, cultured, always goes for an evening walk, and dead keen to help Mildred with all those little jobs George can't be bothered with. George gets jealous and is a weed as ever. Ultimately, his worries are proved to be unfounded, for Rogers has been going to the pub during his evening walk to see his girlfriend. He announces that he is gay, to throw Mildred off his tail, and leaves shortly afterwards.

In December 1977, Mildred decides to have a spring-clean and to turf out some of George's clutter, including his wartime gas mask. She discovers letters he has written to a woman named Dorothy for years and fears that he has been unfaithful and brings a marriage counsellor in - though it turns out that they are unsent fan letters to film actress Dorothy Lamour. Christmas 1977 brings news that Jeffrey is producing and directing the Hampton Wick Players Christmas pantomime, Cinderella. A problem arises however, which leaves the production short of a second ugly sister. Mildred, who has been eager to take part, is offered the role, and accepts. Ethel and Humphrey arrive for the evening of the performance, but by then, Mildred has fallen ill and lost her voice leaving George to take her place. In September 1978, Mildred is thrilled to get a letter from Lee Kennedy, an American ex-airman with whom she had a wartime fling during her time working at the airbase, who is visiting England and wants to see her again. A jealous George rings up his old flame Gloria Rumbold (Claire Davenport) and arranges to meet up for a drink with her - though neither reunion turns out to be as the Ropers had hoped as Lee invites half the airbase to the reunion and Gloria turns out to be an overweight loud-speaking massage parlour worker.

In late September 1978, Mildred is not happy about George mending his motorbike in the house but when Ann goes into labour with Jeffrey away in Birmingham and no chance of a mini-cab, George has to rush her in, in his motorbike. Inevitably George is mistaken for the father but a grateful Ann shocks her husband by suggesting they call their new baby son George. In November 1978, Mildred wants a new Hollywood-style bathroom shower but the professionals' quotes are too pricey for penny-pinching George, so he gets his dodgy friend Jerry to do the installation. Unfortunately Jerry connects the shower to the Fourmiles' plumbing system so that the Ropers end up stealing their neighbours' water.

In December 1978, Mildred decides that she wants her dog Truffles, who is in season, to have puppies. She wants the Ropers to mate her with Ethel's dog in order to produce pedigree puppies that they can sell but find that the pub Labrador has been with Truffles, who is we find out is non-pedigree and when she gives birth, a load of spotty Yorkshire terriers are born. Christmas 1978 becomes a drag for George and Mildred. Having had an extremely boring and non-eventful Christmas Day, George and Mildred spend next day with the Fourmiles where George and Jeffrey become addicted to Tristram's present, a digital table tennis video game, which sees George losing money. Ethel and Humphrey arrive for an exchange of presents but George and Mildred don't have any presents for them as George ate Ethel's present, a box of chocolates, after he thought they weren't coming to see them. Mildred quickly improvises and gives Humphrey a pair of oven gloves and Ethel a pound of cheese.

George buys Mildred a fur coat from the Oxfam shop for their 26th anniversary in 1979 but when she hears that he found a credit card in the pub she assumes he used it in the shop and returns the coat - only to find, too late, that she was mistaken. Shortly after, Mildred goes into hospital with suspected appendicitis so kindly Ann, to Jeffrey's annoyance, has George round for dinner. When he gets home he finds Jerry, who has been evicted, wanting to stay, along with his 'niece' (Sue Bond). But the appendicitis is actually indigestion, and Mildred comes home early. She is not happy to find two unwelcome guests and throws them out. Mildred becomes disenchanted by her failure to be included in the social life on her middle-class estate. She and George return to George's old neighbourhood, with an eye to moving back, and visit his old neighbours Alf and Gladys (Michael Robbins and Queenie Watts), but they find the terraced streets are gone, replaced by modern tower blocks, so the idea is abandoned. Mildred starts taking driving lessons from the elderly Mr. Bowles (Robert Raglan) from the Common, but wants to keep it secret from George, because every time he has tried to teach her, it ends in disaster, so she says she is going to the Keep Fit class. When Ann accidentally lets slip that the Keep Fit class has finished George suspects Mildred of having an affair and, taking advice from Jeffrey, attempts to be more romantic with her. A misunderstanding arises when the supposed lover comes to the Ropers' house but all is resolved as Mildred passes her test.

Browsing through 'Country Life', Ethel sees a photo of a Ming dynasty china horse worth ten thousand pounds. Her mother tells her Mildred owns the only other one in the world and Mildred agrees to sell it to her, having first established that it is one of many worthless copies made in 1927 and not the real thing. For once the Ropers come out on top as Mildred pockets Ethel's cheque for 1,500 pounds. Jeffrey gets an invitation to the Young Conservatives' Dinner Dance, but Ann will be away so she persuades him to take Mildred instead. A jealous George chats up widowed barmaid Beryl, telling her he is single and arranging to meet with her on the night of the dance whilst he is alone in the house. However, Mildred feels out of her depth and returns home early, forcing George to tell Beryl the truth. The Ropers go to bed and, whilst Mildred declares that she loves George for all his faults, his response is less assured - he calls her Beryl. In 1980, Mildred is keen to ascertain whether or not her husband George has remembered their 27th wedding anniversary. Needless to say, he hasn't. By the time he comes to remember, he books a table at the restaurant where he first proposed to Mildred but to his horror, he discovers on arrival that it has been turned into a greasy spoon café run by Hell's Angels-style bikers. Mildred then decides that she and George will celebrate their 27th wedding anniversary in style at the plush, world famous London Hotel in London - however unhappy George might be at the cost involved. But on arrival, George is mistaken for a ruthless hit-man by a shady businessman (Stratford Johns), who wants a rival eliminated.

She adapted easily to the surroundings, but George didn't. Her ageing 74-year-old mother (Gretchen Franklin) was a frequent visitor, and where she loved her, George didn't.

== Storylines ==
Most storylines for Mildred were for her trying to climb the social ladder, and with George ruining her attempts. In George and Mildred she makes friends with her neighbour Ann Fourmile (Fearn), who is married to the snobbish Jeffrey (Eshley). When Ann gave birth to Tarquin in series three, Mildred thinks of adopting a child, and George agrees (providing the baby is not black). The person from the orphanage later declares that the Roper's cannot adopt, for unknown reasons. Feeling sorry for Mildred, George buys her a Yorkshire Terrier, Truffles, who becomes Mildred's pride and joy, and receives better attention than George himself. This is made most clear in the series one episode 'Family Planning', where Mildred's mother stays with them, and George states:

George: Ever since your mother came to stay for us I've come second-best in this house! Mildred: Third-best, George, you forgot about the dog.

Mildred is known for frequently asking if anyone wants a cup of tea.

== Relationship with George ==
George and Mildred's relationship is strained and they suffer each other. Throughout George and Mildred, various relatives of George visit, most commonly his father and younger brother Charlie. When Charlie Roper visit, all names of the Roper siblings are revealed: Fred, Gloria, Betty, Bill, George, Charlie and Bill (it is stated that the second Bill was named after the first). When George's father Jack arrives, their relationship is put under a serious strain, but he eventually leaves and everything returns to normal. When Ethel and Humphrey arrive, George often runs away to the pub or next door, unless Mildred bellows for him to sit.

== After George and Mildred ==
Upon the death in 1980 of Yootha Joyce, who had played Mildred, Thames Television did talk of producing a spin-off for the character of George, looking at him cope with life as a widower. This project did not materialise, but Brian Murphy did reunite with George and Mildred co-star Roy Kinnear and writers Johnnie Mortimer and Brian Cooke for The Incredible Mr. Tanner, a comedy produced for Thames soon after Yootha Joyce's death.

== Appearances ==
Yootha Joyce appeared as Mildred Roper in all episodes of Man About the House and all of the spin-off series, George and Mildred. She also appeared as Mildred in the film version. When Yootha Joyce died in 1980, the character of Mildred died with her.

== Analysis ==
Maggie Andrews sees her as part of a tradition of portraying women characters as consumerist, social-climbing, and pretentious, prefiguring characters such as Hyacinth Bucket in Keeping up Appearances. She was also an influence on the character of Dot Cotton in EastEnders.
