= List of Man About the House characters =

The following is a list of characters from the British sitcom Man About the House, which was originally broadcast on ITV from 15 August 1973 to 7 April 1976. The series followed with spin-off series George and Mildred and Robin's Nest.

== List of characters ==
=== Main ===
- Richard O'Sullivan as Robin Tripp
- Paula Wilcox as Chrissy Plummer
- Sally Thomsett as Jo

=== Supporting ===
- Yootha Joyce as Mildred Roper
- Brian Murphy as George Roper
- Doug Fisher as Larry Simmonds

=== Recurring ===
- Norman Eshley as Ian Cross and Norman Tripp
- Roy Kinnear as Jerry
- Daphne Oxenford as Mrs Plummer
- Jenny Hanley as Liz
- John Carlin as the Barman

== Descriptions ==
=== Robin Tripp ===
Played by Richard O'Sullivan. Robin Tripp studies catering and cookery at technical college and is new to London, hailing from Southampton. Chrissy and Jo find him sleeping in their bath the day after they had held a bridal and farewell party for their departing flatmate, Eleanor. Once the girls find out how good a cook Robin is, they ask him to be their new flatmate. Robin was raised on a farm in the middle of the countryside and is frequently asked by his mother to rejoin them in the family business manufacturing extruded tubing. Even if he succeeds in bringing girls back to the flat, he is usually unsuccessful with them. He is a fan of Southampton F.C. and Fulham F.C. and attends their matches.

=== Chrissy Plummer ===
Played by Paula Wilcox. Chrissy lives in the flat, of which Mildred and George Roper are caretakers, with Jo — and then Robin moves in. She is often taken out by men of all different shapes, sizes and natures. Chrissy is fond of tending her flowers on the balcony, and always prefers her or Robin's cooking as Jo's is always dreadful. She has a sister named Susan who is married to Ted, whom her father dislikes. Chrissy's mother visits Chrissy at the flat and pressures her to get married. Chrissy detests Larry living upstairs.

=== Jo ===
Played by Sally Thomsett. Jo, is easygoing and scatterbrained, known for hosting lively parties with loud music to the annoyance of the Ropers. She often forgets details and makes minor mistakes. Popular in the neighborhood, she is frequently asked out by local regulars. Like her best friend Chrissy, Jo does not get along with Larry.

=== Mildred Roper ===
Played by Yootha Joyce. Mildred is the long-suffering wife of George who is always getting on her nerves. Whether she buys a new hat or armchair, George is not bothered. It is hinted that she used to have many flings with men when she used to work at an airbase during the War. Mildred has a sister called Ethel, who is a snob and is disliked by George and many others. She also has a sexual interest in Robin. Mildred dislikes Jerry, George's best friend and odd-job man who is usually conning people.

=== George Roper ===
Played by Brian Murphy. The dim, lazy husband of Mildred Roper is either at the pub, arguing with Mildred or watching his television set, which often breaks down. George sometimes meets the flatmates in the local pub and is known to be fond of having a Scotch. George is easily led. It is implied in the spin-off series George and Mildred that he was one of seven children.

=== Larry Simmonds ===
Played by Doug Fisher. Larry is the best friend of Robin and the neighbour of Robin, Chrissy and Jo as he lives upstairs in the newly refurbished attic. He frequently visits Robin's flat to borrow things and never gives them back. Larry used to live in another flat but was evicted as he was not paying his rent. He often brings girls of all natures home, but, as he tells Robin, he never gives his real name and usually gives false ones, one once being Robin Tripp!

=== Norman Tripp ===
Played by Norman Eshley. Norman Tripp is Robin's brother who is only seen at the end of the series, not being mentioned before then. He comes to stay with Robin for a few days and starts a relationship with Chrissy. They then arrange to get married, and on the day before Norman and Chrissy's wedding, Mildred is upset that she has not received an invitation. However, when she delivers their wedding present she discovers that they have been invited and that George has hidden it from her because he wants to go to a darts match. Norman eventually marries Chrissy, and they presumably start a new life together.

=== Jerry ===
Played by Roy Kinnear. The incompetent odd-job man who is often persuaded by George to get him to do various jobs around the flat that do not even need doing. Apart from George, he is disliked by all, especially Mildred. He once tried to get Robin, Chrissy and Jo evicted so he could subdivide the flat into smaller units. He also diagnosed one of the doors in the flat as having woodworm despite there being a perfect circle of unmarked wood and a dartboard lying on the floor - the holes were created by missed darts!

=== Mrs Plummer ===
Played by Daphne Oxenford. Chrissy's mother often bothers Chrissy by pressuring her to marry, and annoys Robin. On the day of Chrissy's sister Susan's baby's christening, she goes on that much about Chrissy and Robin getting married that they return home.

=== Liz Martin ===
Played by Jenny Hanley. Liz Martin is a girl Robin is interested in who appears in two episodes. Her first appearance sees her trying to sneak into the flat to spend some time with Robin. It is shown that she has many flings with men and when she is invited to Robin, Chrissy and Jo's party, she stays the whole time with Chrissy's boyfriend, Mark (played by Ian Lavender). Neither are seen again in the series.

=== Jim the Barman ===
Played by Michael Segal. Seen in the first two series, Jim is the friendly barman at the local pub, The Mucky Duck. He often helps Robin out by giving him alcohol 'on the slate' for parties.

=== The Barman ===
Played by John Carlin. The camp Scottish barman at the pub, sometimes referred to as Percy, is obviously homosexual and frequently misunderstands what people say, thinking that it is something sexual. He is very friendly to all, especially Robin, Larry and Mr Roper. In one episode, he tells Robin off for repeatedly calling him "Jock", as his surname is "Strap".

=== Dr. McCleod ===
Played by Duncan Lamont. The local doctor, who appears in two episodes. McCleod treats Robin for flu before his football match, and appears again in the episode "Three of a Kind".
