= List of films based on British television series =

This is a list of theatrically released feature films that are based on British television programmes.

== Comedy ==
TV programme				Film	
Title	Channel	Premiere	End	Title	Premiere
Absolutely Fabulous	BBC2 / BBC1	1992	2012	Absolument fabuleux	2001
Absolutely Fabulous	BBC2 / BBC1	1992	2012	Absolutely Fabulous: The Movie	2016
Da Ali G Show (Note: The Ali G character first appeared in The 11 O'Clock Show)	Channel 4	2000	2004	Ali G Indahouse	2002
Da Ali G Show	Channel 4	2000	2004	Borat: Cultural Learnings of America for Make Benefit Glorious Nation of Kazakhstan	2006
Da Ali G Show	Channel 4	2000	2004	Brüno	2009
Da Ali G Show	Channel 4	2000	2004	Borat Subsequent Moviefilm: Delivery of Prodigious Bribe to American Regime for Make Benefit Once Glorious Nation of Kazakhstan	2020
Da Ali G Show	Channel 4	2000	2004	Ali G: Who Iz I?	2026
Are You Being Served?	BBC1	1972	1985	Are You Being Served?	1977
The Army Game	ITV	1957	1961	I Only Arsked!	1958
Bad Education	BBC Three	2012	2014	The Bad Education Movie	2015
The Benny Hill Show	ITV	1969	1991	The Best of Benny Hill	1974
Bless This House	ITV	1971	1976	Bless This House	1972
Bottom	BBC2	1991	1995	Guest House Paradiso	1999
The Catherine Tate Show	BBC Two / BBC One	2004	2007	The Nan Movie	2022
The Comic Strip Presents...	Channel 4	1982	2016	The Supergrass	1985
The Comic Strip Presents...	Channel 4	1982	2016	Eat the Rich	1987
The Comic Strip Presents...	Channel 4	1982	2016	The Pope Must Die	1991
The Comic Strip Presents...	Channel 4	1982	2016	Churchill: The Hollywood Years	2004
Dad's Army	BBC1	1968	1977	Dad's Army	1971
Dad's Army	BBC1	1968	1977	Dad's Army	2016
The Dick Emery Show	BBC1	1963	1981	Ooh… You Are Awful	1972
Father, Dear Father	ITV	1968	1973	Father, Dear Father	1973
For the Love of Ada	ITV	1970	1971	For the Love of Ada	1972
George and Mildred (Note: The George and Mildred characters first appeared in Man About the House (1973))	ITV	1976	1979	George and Mildred	1980
Ghosts	BBC One	2019	2023	Ghosts: The Possession of Button House	2026
Harry Enfield's Television Programme	BBC2	1990	1992	Kevin & Perry Go Large	2000
Horrible Histories (Note: Horrible Histories was based on the book series of the same name)	CBBC	2009	Present	Horrible Histories: The Movie – Rotten Romans	2019
The Inbetweeners	E4	2008	2010	The Inbetweeners Movie	2011
The Inbetweeners	E4	2008	2010	The Inbetweeners 2	2014
The Inbetweeners	E4	2008	2010	The Inbetweeners 3	TBA
I'm Alan Partridge (Note: The Alan Partridge character first appeared in the radio programme On the Hour (1991) and on TV in The Day Today (1994))	BBC2	1997	2002	Alan Partridge: Alpha Papa	2013
Keith Lemon's Very Brilliant World Tour (Note: The Keith Lemon character first appeared on TV in Bo' Selecta!)	ITV2	2008	2008	Keith Lemon: The Film	2012
The Larkins	ITV	1958	1960	Inn for Trouble	1960
The League of Gentlemen	BBC Two	1999	2002	The League of Gentlemen's Apocalypse	2005
Love Thy Neighbour	ITV	1972	1976	Love Thy Neighbour	1973
The Lovers	ITV	1970	1971	The Lovers!	1973
Man About the House	ITV	1973	1976	Man About the House	1974
Monty Python's Flying Circus	BBC1	1969	1974	And Now for Something Completely Different	1971
Monty Python's Flying Circus	BBC1	1969	1974	Monty Python Live at the Hollywood Bowl	1982
Mr. Bean	ITV	1990	1995	Bean	1997
Mr. Bean	ITV	1990	1995	Mr. Bean's Holiday	2007
Mrs. Brown's Boys (Note: Mrs. Brown's Boys evolved from the radio play Mrs. Browne's Boys (1992) and a book series)	BBC One	2011	TBD	Mrs. Brown's Boys D'Movie	2014
The Muppet Show (Note: The Muppets originated in the American TV programme Sam and Friends (1955), and appeared in other shows predating The Muppet Show)	ITV	1976	1981	The Muppet Movie	1979
The Muppet Show	ITV	1976	1981	The Muppets	2011
The Muppet Show	ITV	1976	1981	Muppets Most Wanted	2014
Nearest and Dearest	ITV	1968	1973	Nearest and Dearest	1972
Never Mind the Quality, Feel the Width	ITV	1967	1971	Never Mind the Quality Feel the Width	1973
The Office	BBC Two	2001	2003	David Brent: Life on the Road	2016
On the Buses	ITV	1969	1973	On the Buses	1971
On the Buses	ITV	1969	1973	Mutiny on the Buses	1972
On the Buses	ITV	1969	1973	Holiday on the Buses	1973
People Just Do Nothing	BBC Three	2014	2018	People Just Do Nothing: Big in Japan	2021
Please Sir!	ITV	1968	1972	Please Sir!	1971
Porridge	BBC1	1974	1977	Porridge	1979
Rising Damp	ITV	1974	1978	Rising Damp	1980
Stella Street	BBC Two	1997	2001	Stella Street	2004
Steptoe and Son	BBC TV	1962	1974	Steptoe and Son	1972
Steptoe and Son	BBC TV	1962	1974	Steptoe and Son Ride Again	1973
That's Your Funeral	BBC1	1970	1971	That's Your Funeral	1972
The Thick of It	BBC Four / BBC Two	2005	2012	In the Loop	2009
Till Death Us Do Part	BBC1	1965	1975	Till Death Us Do Part	1968
Till Death Us Do Part	BBC1	1965	1975	The Alf Garnett Saga	1972
The Trip	BBC Two / Sky Atlantic / Sky One	2010	2020	The Trip	2010
The Trip	BBC Two / Sky Atlantic / Sky One	2010	2020	The Trip to Italy	2014
The Trip	BBC Two / Sky Atlantic / Sky One	2010	2020	The Trip to Spain	2017
The Trip	BBC Two / Sky Atlantic / Sky One	2010	2020	The Trip to Greece	2020
Up Pompeii!	BBC1	1969	1970	Up Pompeii	1971
Up Pompeii!	BBC1	1969	1970	Up the Chastity Belt	1971
Up Pompeii!	BBC1	1969	1970	Up the Front	1972
Whack-O!	BBC Television Service	1956	1972	Bottoms Up	1960
Whatever Happened to the Likely Lads?	BBC1	1973	1974	The Likely Lads	1976
Whoops Apocalypse	ITV	1982	1982	Whoops Apocalypse	1986

== Drama ==
TV programme				Film	
Title	Channel	Premiere	End	Title	Premiere
The Avengers	ITV	1961	1969	The Avengers	1998
Callan	ITV	1967	1972	Callan	1974
Downton Abbey	ITV	2010	2015	Downton Abbey	2019
Downton Abbey	ITV	2010	2015	Downton Abbey: A New Era	2022
Downton Abbey	ITV	2010	2015	Downton Abbey: The Grand Finale	2025
Edge of Darkness	BBC2	1985	1985	Edge of Darkness	2010
The Grove Family	BBC Television Service	1954	1957	It's a Great Day	1955
Luther	BBC One	2010	2019	Luther: The Fallen Sun	2023
Man at the Top	ITV	1970	1972	Man at the Top	1973
Peaky Blinders	BBC Two / BBC One	2013	2022	Peaky Blinders: The Immortal Man	2026
Pennies from Heaven	BBC1	1978	1978	Pennies from Heaven	1981
Play for Today	BBC1	1970	1984	Scum (Note: Based on Scum (television_play), which was filmed in 1977 and transmitted in 1991)	1979
Play for Today	BBC1	1970	1984	Brimstone and Treacle (Note: Based on Brimstone and Treacle, which was filmed in 1976 and transmitted in 1987)	1982
Play for Today	BBC1	1970	1984	Track 29 (Note: Based on Schmoedipus, transmitted in 1974)	1988
The Saint	ITV	1962	1969	The Saint	1997
The Sentimental Agent	ITV	1963	1963	Our Man in the Caribbean	1962
The Singing Detective	BBC1	1986	1986	The Singing Detective	2003
The Six Wives of Henry VIII	BBC2	1970	1970	Henry VIII and His Six Wives	1972
Spooks	BBC One	2002	2011	Spooks: The Greater Good	2015
State of Play	BBC One	2003	2003	State of Play	2009
The Sweeney	ITV	1975	1978	Sweeney!	1977
The Sweeney	ITV	1975	1978	Sweeney 2	1978
The Sweeney	ITV	1975	1978	The Sweeney	2012
Traffik	Channel 4	1989	1989	Traffic	2000
Widows	ITV	1983	1985	Widows	2018

== Science fiction ==
TV programme				Film	
Title	Channel	Premiere	End	Title	Premiere
Doctor Who	BBC TV	1963	1989	Dr. Who and the Daleks	1965
Doctor Who	BBC TV	1963	1989	Daleks' Invasion Earth: 2150 A.D.	1966
Doomwatch	BBC1	1970	1972	Doomwatch	1972
The Quatermass Experiment	BBC Television Service	1953	1953	The Quatermass Xperiment	1955
Quatermass II	BBC Television Service	1955	1955	Quatermass 2	1957
Quatermass and the Pit	BBC Television Service	1958	1959	Quatermass and the Pit	1967
Quatermass	ITV	1979	1979	The Quatermass Conclusion	1980
Thunderbirds	ITV	1965	1966	Thunderbirds Are Go	1966
Thunderbirds	ITV	1965	1966	Thunderbird 6	1968
Thunderbirds	ITV	1965	1966	Thunderbirds	2004

== Documentary ==
TV programme				Film	
Title	Channel	Premiere	End	Title	Premiere
The Blue Planet	BBC One	2001	2001	Deep Blue	2003
Planet Earth	BBC One / BBC HD	2006	2006	Earth	2007
Planet Earth	BBC One / BBC HD	2006	2006	Earth: One Amazing Day	2017
Walking with Dinosaurs	BBC One	1999	1999	Walking with Dinosaurs	2013
Walking with Dinosaurs	BBC One	1999	1999	Walking with Dinosaurs: Prehistoric Planet 3D	2014

== Children's television ==
TV programme				Film	
Title	Channel	Premiere	End	Title	Premiere
Fireman Sam	BBC1 / Channel 5	1987	TBD	Fireman Sam: Alien Alert! The Movie	2017
Friday Download	CBBC	2011	2015	Friday Download: The Movie	2015
The Magic Roundabout	BBC1 / Channel 4	1965	1992	Dougal and the Blue Cat	1972
The Magic Roundabout	BBC1 / Channel 4	1965	1992	The Magic Roundabout	2005
Postman Pat	BBC1 / CBeebies	1981	2017	Postman Pat: The Movie	2014
Shaun the Sheep (Note: The Shaun character first appeared in A Close Shave (1995))	CBBC	2007	TBD	Shaun the Sheep Movie	2015
Shaun the Sheep	CBBC	2007	TBD	A Shaun the Sheep Movie: Farmageddon	2019
Shaun the Sheep	CBBC	2007	TBD	Shaun the Sheep: The Beast of Mossy Bottom	2026
Wallace and Gromit	BBC1	1989	2008	Wallace & Gromit: The Curse of the Were-Rabbit	2005
Wallace and Gromit	BBC1	1989	2008	Wallace & Gromit: Vengeance Most Fowl	2024

== See also ==
- List of films based on television programs
- Cinema of the United Kingdom
