= John Comer =

British actor (1924–1984)

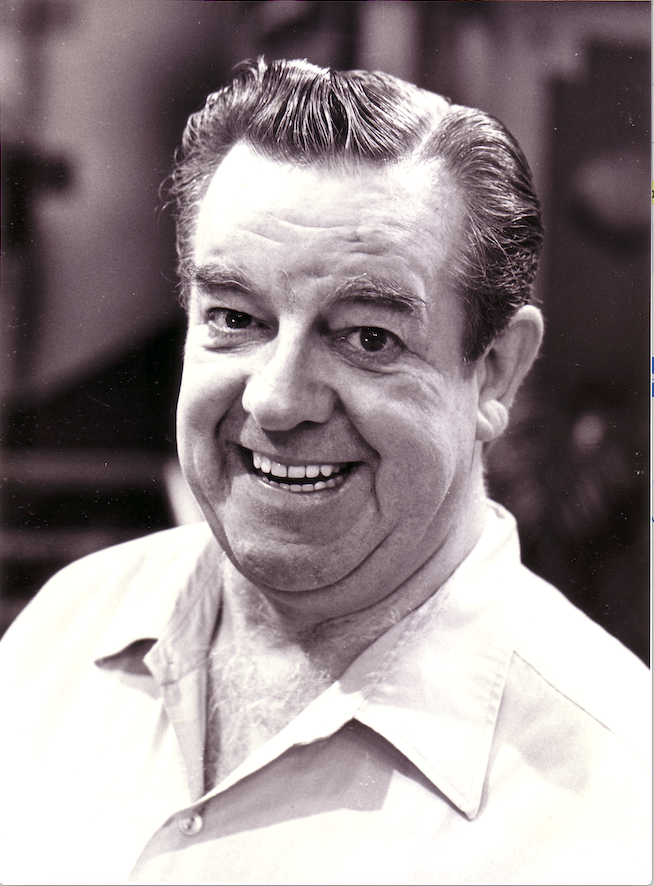
- Born: 1 March 1924; Stretford, Lancashire, England
- Died: 11 February 1984 (aged 59); Blackpool, Lancashire, England
- Resting place: Carleton Crematorium and Cemetery, Carleton, Lancashire, England
- Occupation: Actor
- Years active: 1941–1984

John Comer (1 March 1924 – 11 February 1984) was a British comic actor. He was best known for his roles in Coronation Street as Mr Birtles, then as a taxi driver, and later as Wilf Jones, in Emmerdale Farm as Ernie Shuttleworth, Les Brandon in I Didn't Know You Cared, and cafe owner Sid in Last of the Summer Wine.

== Early life ==
Born and brought up in Stretford, Lancashire, Comer gained an engineering apprenticeship at Metropolitan-Vickers, Trafford Park. He served in mining as a Bevin Boy during World War II.

== Early career ==
Comer began his career performing a comedy routine around local social clubs and pubs in the 1930s and 1940s. In 1952, with his younger brother Tony, he performed in a children's theatre production for local schools in Stretford. The siblings then formed a double act named the Comer Brothers. In 1957, the brothers began a regular slot at the Manchester Apollo, performing a variety act entitled Comer's Cottage.

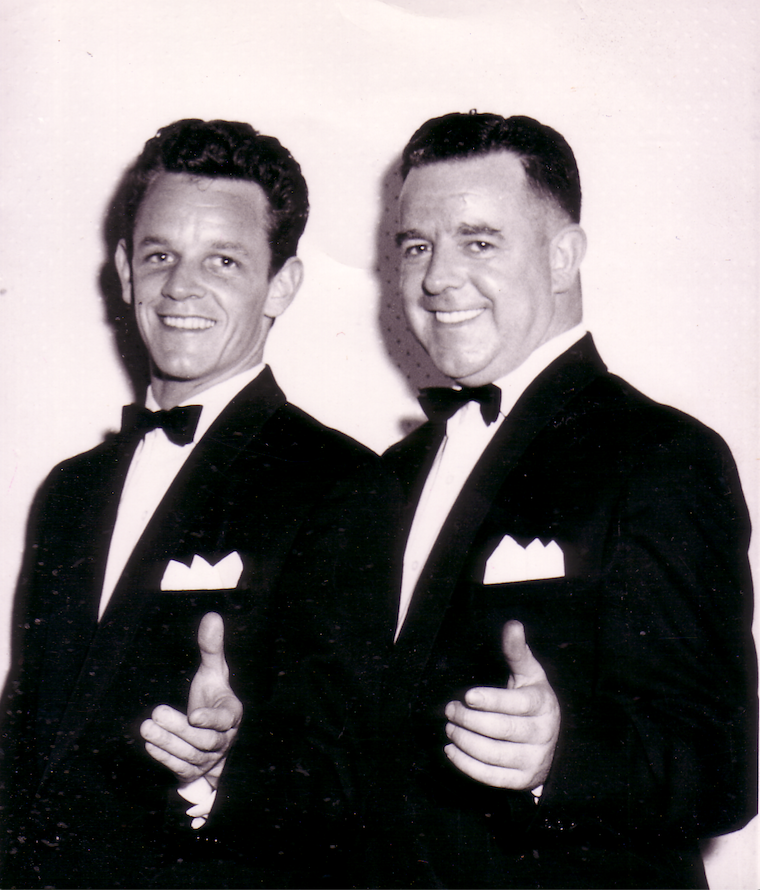
Tony & John Comer, as the Comer Brothers

In 1958, the Comer Brothers participated in an ITV talent show called Bid for Fame and began working for Butlin's. In 1959, they won first prize in the Butlin's National Talent Contest, winning £1,000 and a film contract with the Boulting Brothers.

== Success ==
In 1959, the Boulting brothers cast John and Tony Comer in the film I'm All Right Jack, in which they starred alongside Peter Sellers and Richard Attenborough as trade union shop stewards. Their next film roles were in 1961, when they featured alongside Rita Tushingham in A Taste of Honey. However, shortly afterwards Tony decided to leave showbusiness and returned to full-time work at Metropolitan-Vickers, while John decided to continue pursuing his film career. He appeared in the Boulting Brothers' 1967 film The Family Way as a father-of-the-bride to Hayley Mills's character, whose father John Mills portrayed her father-in-law.

He gained a recurring role in 1973 as the primary supporting role of Sid in the new BBC sitcom Last of the Summer Wine. He also starred in a long-running advertising campaign for Home Brew Beer. In 1977, he appeared as Bill Malley in the BBC series Murder Most English. Comer appeared in an episode of All Creatures Great and Small entitled "The Name of the Game" in 1978.

John Comer as Sid with Jane Freeman as Ivy in Last of the Summer Wine

== Death ==
Comer died of throat cancer in 1984, at the age of 59. The disease had so affected his voice that in his final television appearance, as cafe owner Sid, in the Last of the Summer Wine Christmas episode Getting Sam Home, his lines had to be dubbed by another actor, Tony Melody. His funeral was held at Carleton Crematorium, Blackpool, where he is commemorated at rose-bed no. 18. After the death of Comer's wife, Mollie, in 2010, his estate was finalised; in 2013 the Comer family donated £245,000 to the hospice in Blackpool where John Comer was treated before his death.

== Film roles ==
Year	Title	Role	
1953	Top Secret	Walk on (At train station showing papers)	
1959	I'm Alright Jack	Union Shop Steward	
1960	Hell Is a City	Plainclothes Police Driver	Uncredited
1963	Heavens Above!	Butcher	
1964	The Counterfeit Constable		
1965	Rotten to the Core	Police Sergeant	Uncredited
1966	The Family Way	Leslie Piper	
1968	Happy Deathday	Briggs	
1969	Battle of Britain	Policeman	Uncredited
1970	There's a Girl in My Soup	John, the porter	
1970	Wuthering Heights		
1971	Villain	Waiter at House of Commons	Uncredited
1971	Mr. Forbush and the Penguins	Police Sergeant	
1972	Dr. Phibes Rises Again	Ship's Officer	Uncredited
1973	The Lovers!	Geoffrey's Dad	
1981	Memoirs of a Survivor	Man delivering Emily	

== Television roles ==
Year	Title	Role	Notes
1962–63	Coronation Street	Mr. Birtles	2 episodes
1965	Coronation Street	Taxi Driver	1 episode
1966	Pardon the Expression	Police Constable	Episode: "January Sale"
1966	The Man in Room 17	Sergeant Thomas Lynch	Episode: "The Standard"
1967	Turn Out the Lights	Policeman	Episode: "You Can't Get the Wood"
1968	City '68		Episode: "The Visitors"
1968	Coronation Street	Wilf Jones	5 episodes
1969	The Avengers	Sergeant Ronald Groom	Episode: "Take-Over"
1969	Nearest and Dearest	Policeman	Episode: "Breach of the Peace"
1970	The Wednesday Play	Warrant Officer	Episode: "The Hunting of Lionel Crane"
1971	Hine	Arthur	Episode: "Comrades in Arms"
1973	Bless This House	The Landlord	2 episodes
1973	Crown Court	Police Constable	Episode: "The Mugging of Arthur Simmons"
1972–1974	Play For Today	Various	
1973	All Our Saturdays	Wilf	6 episodes
1973–1983	Last of the Summer Wine	Sid	(final appearance)
1975	The Life of Riley	George Pollitt	
1975	Emmerdale Farm	Ernie Shuttleworth	3 episodes
1975–1979	I Didn't Know You Cared	Les Brandon	27 episodes
1976–1978	Potter's Picture Palace	Sidney Bogart	13 episodes
1977	Beryl's Lot	Plasterer / George Hotten	2 episodes
1977	Survivors	Les Norton	Episode: "Long Live the King"
1977	Murder Most English	Police Sergeant Malley	5 episodes
1978	All Creatures Great and Small	Mr. Dimmock	Episode: "The Name of the Game"
1980	Nice Work	Mr. Blundell	
