= Man About the House (film) =

1974 British comedy film by John Robins

- UK theatrical poster
- Directed by: John Robins
- Written by: Johnnie Mortimer; Brian Cooke
- Based on: Man About the House by: Johnnie Mortimer; Brian Cooke
- Produced by: Roy Skeggs
- Starring: Richard O'Sullivan; Paula Wilcox; Sally Thomsett; Yootha Joyce; Brian Murphy
- Cinematography: James Allen
- Edited by: Archie Ludski
- Music by: Christopher Gunning
- Production company: Hammer Films
- Distributed by: EMI Films
- Release date: 22 December 1974
- Running time: 90 mins
- Country: United Kingdom
- Language: English
- Box office: £90,000 (London area)

Man About the House is a 1974 British comedy film directed by John Robins and starring Richard O'Sullivan, Paula Wilcox, Sally Thomsett, Yootha Joyce and Brian Murphy. It was written by Johnnie Mortimer and Brian Cooke based on the ITV sitcom of the same name (1973–1976), starring the same main cast.

== Plot ==
The Ropers learn that Mr. Pluthero, an estate agent and developer, wants to buy their building. The room-mates circulate a petition to stop the development, which attracts the interest of MP Sir Edmund Weir, who keeps a mistress in another house in the same street.

== Cast ==
- Richard O'Sullivan as Robin Tripp
- Paula Wilcox as Chrissy Plummer
- Sally Thomsett as Jo
- Yootha Joyce as Mrs Roper
- Brian Murphy as Mr Roper
- Peter Cellier as Morris Pluthero
- Doug Fisher as Larry Simmonds
- Arthur Lowe as Mr Spiros
- Bill Maynard as chef
- Aimi MacDonald as Hazel Lovett
- Patrick Newell as Sir Edmund Weir
- Andria Lawrence as Miss Amelia Bird
- Bill Grundy as interviewer
- Michael Ward as Mr Gideon
- Julian Orchard as the producer
- Aubrey Morris as the lecturer
- Bill Pertwee as the postman
- Johnny Briggs as the milkman
- Melvyn Hayes as Nigel
- Berry Cornish as P.A.
- Bill Sawyer as chauffeur
- Mark Rogers as boy scout
- Pauline Peart as secretary
- Arthur Hewlett as elderly man
- Annie Leake as tweedy lady
- Corinne Skinner as housewife
- Michael Robbins as doorman
- Norman Mitchell as Arthur Mulgrove
- Jack Smethurst as himself
- Rudolph Walker as himself
- Spike Milligan as himself

== Production ==
The film started shooting in March 1974 at Elstree Studios in London, finishing on 12 April.

It was the last in a series of big screen adaptations of popular television comedies made by Hammer Films, although a film of George & Mildred (featuring Yootha Joyce and Brian Murphy in the title roles) was made in 1980 by another studio.

The plot of the film hinted at the story arc of the TV versions of Man About the House and George and Mildred, where the Ropers' building was eventually subject to a compulsory purchase order forcing them to move.

== Reception ==
=== Box office ===
The film was a hit, taking £90,000 in London alone.

=== Critical ===
The Monthly Film Bulletin wrote: "In Man About the House, the battle between the property developers and the environmentalists is merely a backdrop to the serious business of a sex comedy. ... But It is a comedy of words, not actions – the only breast exposed is a manly one – and the script manages to produce some good laughs and a few sniggers. In this, it is well served by an experienced supporting cast. ... Yootha Joyce, as the frustrated Mrs. Roper, is particularly strong; even the more explicit sexual jokes leave her lips with a venom which seems born of real despair. As the tenants, Paula Wilcox and Richard O'Sullivan exude a lively warmth, while the vacuous Sally Thomsett looks on. The film succeeds within the limits which it sets itself, though there are some directorial miscalculations ... But in the main, the film acquits itself better than most movie spin-offs from TV series."

Leslie Halliwell wrote "Mild and rather exhausting sex comedy from the TV series, as relentlessly single-minded as a Carry On."

David Parkinson in the Radio Times wrote: "Great cast, shame about the script ... The material is thinner than a bedsit wall."
