= All Our Saturdays =

- Genre: Sitcom
- Starring: Diana Dors; Tony Caunter; Norman Jones; Anthony Jackson; John Comer; Doug Fisher
- Country of origin: United Kingdom
- Original language: English
- No. of episodes: 6

Production
- Running time: 30 minutes
- Production company: Yorkshire Television

Original release
- Network: ITV
- Release: 14 February – 21 March 1973

All Our Saturdays is a British sitcom starring Diana Dors that aired in 1973. Stuart Harris wrote two episodes, while Oliver Free, Eric Geen, Anthony Crouch and Peter Robinson & David Rutherford all wrote one each. It was made for the ITV network by Yorkshire Television.

It followed Dors' success in Queenie's Castle.

== Cast ==
- Diana Dors as Di Dorkins
- Tony Caunter as Ken Hicks
- Norman Jones as Stan Maycock
- Anthony Jackson as Frank Bosomworth
- John Comer as Wilf
- Doug Fisher as Ronnie Rendell

== Plot ==
Di, known as 'Big D', runs a large textile company called Garsley Garments and also is the manager of the local rugby league team. Always at the bottom of the league, she renames the team Frilly Things and sets about reviving their fortunes.

== Episodes ==
1. "Charity Meets Its Match" (14 February 1973)
2. "The Unhappy Hooker" (21 February 1973)
3. "100 Years of Outstanding Underthings" (28 February 1973)
4. "The Ref Is Always Right?" (7 March 1973)
5. "Come Home Stan Maycock" (14 March 1973)
6. "When The Nobbling Had To Stop" (21 March 1973)
