= Lassiter (film) =

1984 film by Roger Young

- Theatrical release poster by Steven Chorney
- Directed by: Roger Young
- Written by: David Taylor
- Produced by: Albert S. Ruddy
- Starring: Tom Selleck; Jane Seymour; Lauren Hutton; Bob Hoskins; Joe Regalbuto; Ed Lauter; Warren Clarke
- Cinematography: Gil Taylor
- Edited by: Benjamin A. Weissman
- Music by: Ken Thorne
- Production company: Golden Harvest Pictures Ltd.
- Distributed by: Warner Bros.
- Release date: 17 February 1984
- Running time: 100 minutes
- Countries: United States; Hong Kong
- Language: English
- Budget: $10 million
- Box office: $17,513,452

Lassiter (also known as The Magnificent Thief) is a 1984 heist spy film starring Tom Selleck, Jane Seymour and Lauren Hutton. The movie was made to cash in on Selleck's popularity as the character Thomas Magnum in the television show Magnum, P.I., but it failed to return its budget at the box office on release. The Magnum, P.I. connection is perhaps most clearly seen by the movie poster tagline: The Magnum Man Hits the Big Screen with a Vengeance.

== Plot ==
Nick Lassiter (Selleck) is a gentleman jewel thief in 1939 London, England. He is arrested by the police after breaking into a London mansion, and after being a member of a phony lineup in which he is positively identified by a law enforcement plant, British law enforcement and the FBI blackmail Lassiter to break into the German embassy and steal $10 million in Nazi diamonds from a German spy (Lauren Hutton), but first he must locate their hiding place. The gems are en route to South America and will be sold to help finance Hitler's military buildup. The authorities want the Nazi diamonds and to put Lassiter away for good, but he has other plans, and a surprise twist ending changes everything.

== Cast ==
- Tom Selleck as Nick Lassiter
- Jane Seymour as Sara Wells
- Lauren Hutton as Kari Von Fursten
- Bob Hoskins as Inspector John Becker
- Joe Regalbuto as Peter Breeze
- Ed Lauter as "Smoke"
- Warren Clarke as Max Hofer
- Edward Peel as Sergeant Allyce
- Christopher Malcolm as Quaid
- Peter Skellern as The Pianist
- Harry Towb as Roger Boardman
- Belinda Mayne as Helen Boardman
- W. Morgan Sheppard as Sweeny
- Brian Coburn as Burto Gunz
- David Warbeck as Muller
- Nicholas Bond-Owen as Freddie

== Production ==
The film was Selleck's second starring vehicle after becoming an international name with Magnum. He optioned the script himself, showed it to Golden Harvest while making High Road to China, and they bought the option.

Selleck signed to make Lassiter before High Road to China came out "because I thought it was a good idea to have another film lined up in case High Road didn't work." The film would be directed by Roger Young, who directed the pilot for Magnum, and the filmmakers agreed to work around Selleck's limited schedule—he could only film between April and June. "If I'd planned things out maybe I wouldn't have picked two period films in a row," he said. "But this was by far the best thing that came along. I hope I fit into it. I like the clothes and the hook."

Selleck admitted shortly before filming that he was having second thoughts about making the movie. Advance word on High Road was strong and he was offered a number of other movies, but he stuck to his original promise. Selleck said, "In a business where you often hear actors described as children, it's nice to be treated as a partner and as an equal. I was able to have a lot of input into the script, although it didn't need that much." "Nick Lassiter is a little rougher around the edges than Magnum," said Selleck. "He's a very self assured character. He should be able to walk into a movie with a certain amount of arrogance and gall."

== Reception ==
Lassiter grossed over $17.5 million at the box office against its $10 million production budget.

The film received mixed reviews from critics. Lassiter holds a 53% rating on Rotten Tomatoes based on 15 reviews as of 2023.
