= Man About the House =

British TV sitcom (1973–1976)

- Genre: Sitcom
- Created by: Brian Cooke; Johnnie Mortimer
- Starring: Richard O'Sullivan; Paula Wilcox; Sally Thomsett; Yootha Joyce; Brian Murphy
- Country of origin: United Kingdom
- Original language: English
- No. of series: 6
- No. of episodes: 39 + 1 short (list of episodes)

Production
- Producer: Peter Frazer-Jones
- Running time: 30 minutes
- Production company: Thames Television

Original release
- Network: ITV
- Release: 15 August 1973 – 7 April 1976

Related
- George and Mildred; Robin's Nest; Three's Company (US); Sam sam (NL); En fyra för tre (SWE); Tre på toppen (NOR); Lokatorzy (POL); Трое сверху (RUS); El hombre de la casa (ECU); Tres son multitud (CHI); Un hombre en casa (ARG)

Man About the House is a British sitcom created by Brian Cooke and Johnnie Mortimer. It starred Richard O'Sullivan, Paula Wilcox, Sally Thomsett, Yootha Joyce and Brian Murphy. Six series were broadcast on ITV from 15 August 1973 to 7 April 1976. The series was considered daring at the time because it featured a man sharing a London flat with two single women. The show was made by Thames Television and recorded at its Teddington Studios in Greater London. It is regularly repeated on ITV3.

A film version was released in 1974 and two spin-off series immediately followed the end of the series: George and Mildred and Robin's Nest. Man About the House placed 69th in a 2004 poll to find Britain's Best Sitcom. The series was remade in the United States as Three's Company in 1977.

== Cast ==
From left to right: Thomsett, Wilcox and O'Sullivan

=== Main cast ===
- Richard O'Sullivan as Robin Tripp
- Paula Wilcox as Chrissy Plummer
- Sally Thomsett as Jo
- Yootha Joyce as Mildred Roper
- Brian Murphy as George Roper

=== Recurring cast ===
- Doug Fisher as Larry Simmonds (19 episodes; all series)
- Daphne Oxenford as Mrs Plummer (3 episodes; series 1, 4 and 6)
- Michael Segal as Jim the landlord (5 episodes; series 1 and 2)
- Jenny Hanley as Liz Martin (2 episodes; series 1 and 2)
- Duncan Lamont as Doctor McLeod (2 episodes; series 1 and 3)
- John Carlin as Barman / Mr. Gideon (7 episodes; series 2, 4 and 6)
- Leslie Sands as Mr Tripp (2 episodes; series 2 and 6)
- Roy Kinnear as Jerry (3 episodes; series 3 to 5)
- Glynn Edwards as Mr Dudley Plummer (2 episodes; series 4 and 6)
- Norman Eshley as Norman Tripp (3 episodes; series 6) and as Ian Cross (1 episode; series 2 episode 3)

== Plot ==
Chrissy and Jo share a flat together in Earl's Court, west London, as well as working for the same company. The women find a stranger, student chef Robin Tripp, asleep in their bath the morning after the farewell party for their departed flatmate Eleanor. When he meets the two girls, Robin has been in London two days, having moved from Southampton to attend university. The girls are unimpressed with Gabrielle (Helen Fraser) as a potential replacement for Eleanor, but they are impressed by Robin's culinary skills, as they cannot cook at all. Learning that Robin has been staying at the YMCA, they convince him to move in, on the understanding that it will be a platonic relationship.

Chrissy tells landlord George Roper that Robin is gay, to eliminate George's objections to the mixed-sex living arrangement. George, in truth a subletting landlord placed by the council, is a miserly, spiteful and unkempt man under the thumb of his domineering and sexually frustrated wife Mildred.

In the second episode, Robin's true sexuality becomes known to Mildred. She takes out her frustrations with George's lack of class and sexual inadequacy by making suggestive remarks to Robin and frequently siding with the tenants against George. Mildred openly flirts with Robin, and Robin frequently flirts with Chrissy and Jo. The girls, adhering to their pledge to maintain a platonic relationship with Robin, spurn his mild advances and adapt to his presence in the flat. Chrissy occasionally shows attraction to Robin, but the two never pursue any romantic interaction.

Robin's friend Larry, a lovable rogue, appears on a recurring basis throughout the series. In the third series, he moves into the loft apartment above the trio's apartment and is a frequent source of trouble. Another occasional cast member is George's friend, the dodgy builder Jerry (Roy Kinnear). Jerry is the only supporting character to reappear in the spin-off George and Mildred.

Robin's brother Norman Tripp (Norman Eshley) appears in the final three episodes of the sixth and final series, and starts a romance with Chrissy. The series ends with Norman and Chrissy marrying. Eshley had a previous guest role in the episode "In Praise of Older Men" (Series 2, Episode 3), and would subsequently appear as another character, the Ropers' neighbour, in George and Mildred.

== Episodes ==
First airing on 15 August 1973, Man About the House ran until 7 April 1976, spanning 39 episodes in six series. In addition, on Christmas Day 1973, a short special aired as part of All-star Comedy Carnival.

== Theme music ==
Written by Johnny Hawksworth and entitled "Up to Date", the theme song was not specially commissioned for the show, but rather was provided via the production music company De Wolfe Music. It also appeared on the 1996 compilation CD The Sound Gallery – Volume Two, but credited to the Simon Park Orchestra.

== Film ==
A 1974 film version of the show starred all of the main cast members. It was the last in a series of movie screen adaptations of popular TV shows made by Hammer Films, though a George and Mildred film (featuring Yootha Joyce and Brian Murphy) would be made in 1980 by another studio.

== Spin-offs and remakes ==
After the series ended in 1976, two successful spin-off series followed:

- George and Mildred, in which the Ropers move to the suburbs.
- Robin's Nest, in which Robin gets married and opens a bistro.

The format of Man About the House was sold internationally, and it was remade in the United States as Three's Company in 1976; in the Netherlands as Sam Sam (literal translation 'Shared') from 1994 to 2003; in Sweden as En fyra för tre (One Four-room Flat for Three) in 1996; in Norway as Tre på toppen (Three at the Top) in 1997; in Portugal as Não Há Duas Sem Três (There is no Two Without Three) in 1997; in Poland as Lokatorzy (The Tenants) from 2000 to 2005; in Russia as Tope cbepxy [Troe sverkhu] (Three from Above) from 2006 to 2007; in Ecuador as El hombre de la casa (The Man of the House) in 2007; and made in Chile (broadcast in Chile, United Arab Emirates, Spain, and Mexico) as Tres son multitud (Three’s a Crowd) in 2007.

The American Three's Company adaptation also spawned the same spin-offs as had Man About the House: Three's a Crowd (based on Robin's Nest) and The Ropers (based upon George and Mildred).

Two and a half decades after the original ended, there were plans for Man About the House to return to British TV screens in the early 2000s with a new cast consisting of Johnny Vaughan, Amanda Holden and Jane Wall as the new main stars of the show, but those plans were scrapped before getting past the pre-planning stage.

== Home media ==
All six series have been released on DVD in the UK by Network DVD, as have George and Mildred and Robin's Nest.

Region 2 releases:

- Series 1 – 2005 (reissued on 8 April 2013)
- Series 2 – 30 January 2006
- Series 3 – 20 March 2006
- Series 4 – 7 August 2006
- Series 5 – 22 January 2007
- Series 6 – 14 May 2007
- The Complete Series (features the six individual seasons in a box) – 24 September 2007
- The Complete Series (in slimmer packaging) – 26 May 2008

Series 1 and 2 have had an American release as part of a two-disc set by FremantleMedia.

Series 1 and 2 were released in Australia in 2004, but a delay was encountered in releasing further series because of contract renegotiations (the same problem affected releases of George and Mildred and Bless This House). Series 3 was finally released on 16 July 2008, and Series 4 on 5 November 2008. Series 5 and 6 are yet to be released. Series 1 was re-released on 2 April 2009, now with the same cover art as the UK edition. Fremantle Media re-released series 1 on 3 March 2011 with new cover art. Re-releases have continued with Series 2 on 3 October 2012, Series 3 on 1 May 2013, and Series 4 on 1 May 2013. Series 5 and Series 6 finally received a release on 7 August 2013. Via Vision Entertainment announced that The Complete Series would be released on October 21, 2020 but this was never published, which would be the first time this series would be released as a collection.

In 2019, a 19-disc DVD set (Region 2) was issued by Network/Fremantle featuring every episode of Man About the House, George and Mildred and Robin's Nest.

- Dennis Waterman appeared in Man About the House as Franz Wasserman, a German philosophy student invited to a party by Robin in the episode "Did You Ever Meet Rommel?". Wasserman is German for Waterman.

== See also ==
- British sitcom
- List of films based on British sitcoms
