= Baxter! =

1972 British-American drama film

- Theatrical Release Poster
- Directed by: Lionel Jeffries
- Screenplay by: Reginald Rose
- Based on: The Boy Who Could Make Himself Disappear by Kin Platt
- Produced by: Arthur Lewis
- Starring: Patricia Neal; Britt Ekland; Lynn Carlin; Jean-Pierre Cassel; Scott Jacoby
- Cinematography: Geoffrey Unsworth
- Edited by: Teddy Darvas
- Music by: Michael J. Lewis
- Production companies: Anglo-EMI Film Distributors; Group W Films; Hanna-Barbera Productions; Performing Arts
- Distributed by: MGM-EMI Distributors (UK); National General Pictures (US)
- Release dates: March 1973 (UK): 4 March 1973 (New York City)
- Running time: 100 mins
- Countries: United Kingdom; United States
- Language: English

Baxter! is a 1973 drama film directed by Lionel Jeffries and starring Patricia Neal, Jean-Pierre Cassel and Britt Ekland. The film follows a young boy called Roger Baxter who struggles to overcome his speech problem (rhotacism) and his strained relationship with his parents. The screenplay was by Reginald Rose, based on the 1968 book by Kin Platt, The Boy Who Could Make Himself Disappear.

The film was made before Jeffries' third film as director, The Amazing Mr Blunden (1972), but released afterwards.

== Plot ==
Roger Baxter, a young American boy with a speech impediment, goes to live in London with his mother after his parents' divorce. He struggles to pronounce the letter R, and at school he becomes close to his speech therapist. He makes friends with his upstairs neighbour Chris Bentley whom he meets in the lift, and her French husband, Roger Tunnell. He also meets Nemo, a girl who lives across the street from his flat. His parents are extremely self-centred and neglectful, and he feels isolated in a strange city. He eventually slides into an emotional breakdown.

== Cast ==
- Scott Jacoby as Roger Baxter
- Patricia Neal as Doctor Roberta Clemm
- Jean-Pierre Cassel as Roger Tunnell
- Britt Ekland as Chris Bentley
- Lynn Carlin as Mrs. Baxter
- Sally Thomsett as Nora "Nemo" Newman
- Paul Eddington as Mr. Rawling
- Paul Maxwell as Mr. Baxter
- Ian Thompson as Dr. Walsh
- Ronald Leigh-Hunt as Mr. Fishie
- Frances Bennett as Mrs. Newman
- Dorothy Alison as Nurse Kennedy
- George Tovey as George
- Marianne Stone as woman

== Production ==
The Boy Who Could Make Himself Disappear was published in 1968. The book was very well received. According to one writer, "the novel touched a nerve with readers and heralded a new form of psychologically based YA book. Authors such as Marjorie Kellogg and John Neufeld would later find success with similar material." The Chicago Reader called the book "unforgettable".

In November 1971, it was announced the film version of the book would be called The Boy and it would be a co production between Anglo-EMI Films and Group W Films. Hanna-Barbera were also involved in making the movie; it is one of the studio's live-action efforts, despite being primarily known as an animation studio. It was meant to be the first of three films planned jointly between Anglo-EMI, Group W and Roger Lewis.

Jeffries knew finding an actor to play the lead would be difficult, as he had to play a twelve year old who could depict emotion and a speech impediment. "Twelve year olds like that don't grow on trees," said Jeffries. He found Scott Jacoby, who had just played the lead in a TV movie, That Certain Summer. "He was the only one who listened," said Jeffries. "The others were so busy telling me what they had done that they didn't listen at all when I told them what I wanted them to do now." "That boy is going to be one of the biggest stars we have," said Patricia Neal.

It was a rare English-language film for Jean-Pierre Cassel.

Filming started 29 November 1971 at Elstree Studios in London.

Editor Teddy Darvas stated, "I think of the [first] three films that Lionel has directed, Baxter is the minor masterpiece. It has an emotion which is quite out of this world. And when we finished the film, it turned out that Bernard Delfont couldn't bear films with children's illnesses in them. And so the film was shelved."

== Reception ==
Variety called it "a good tearjerker" that was "well directed" but felt "Reginald Rose’s adaptation is episodic and more like that of a made-for-tv feature than a theatrical pic... The film’s theatrical potential is very limited for a number of reasons which have nothing to do with the many excellent dramatic values attained. A far wider and more responsive audience would await it on tv."

The Evening Standard complained about the "wads of extraneous gloss" and "the film's ludicrous irrelevancy."

The Los Angeles Times called the film "easy to criticize, almost impossible not to like."

Academic Paul Moody wrote:

If one film EMI released in the period summed up the spirit (or lack of spirit) of the early 1970s, it was the bleak message of this production that was ostensibly for family viewing, which portrayed Baxter’s disaffection and eventual capitulation, giving in to his despair and taking his own life. It was almost as if the national malaise ensured that genuinely positive stories of modern Britain would have no traction with audiences, who were increasingly looking backwards to idealised notions of the past.

Teddy Darvas argued:

I think from Lionel's career point of view, it's a great shame that Baxter was sneaked out eventually after Amazing Mr Blunden because he was labelled as a director of children's films and if Baxter had come out in between and if it had been pushed, people would have seen that he could do the great romantic or the great emotional grown up film as well... Baxter was sneaked out, put on the ABC circuit... without any publicity and, of course, it flopped and had to be taken off. It was, of course, a film that should have been put on today, it would have been put on the sort of specialist market in smaller cinemas and shown in discreetly and more discerningly.
