= John Carlin (actor) =

Scottish actor (1929–2017)

- Born: 6 November 1929; Johnstone, Scotland, United Kingdom
- Died: 19 November 2017 (aged 88); Gloucestershire, England, United Kingdom
- Education: Royal Conservatoire of Scotland
- Occupation: Actor

John Carlin (6 November 1929 – 19 November 2017) was a Scottish actor. He appeared on television from 1957 to 1992 and has 109 credits from films and television series.

== Early years ==
Carlin was born on 6 November 1929 in Johnstone, Scotland, and he attended the Glasgow College of Dramatic Art.

== Career ==
In the late 1950s, Carlin acted with the Birmingham Repertory Theatre. He made his radio debut in 1955 on the Children's Hour and went on to appear in a number of television programmes in the 1960s. Also in the 1960s he worked as a disc jockey on the BBC's Light Programme.

== Death ==
Carlin died on 19 November 2017 in Gloucestershire, England.

== Filmography ==
Year	Title	Role
1957	The Piper of Orde	Colin
1971	Remembrandt	Kemp
1976	Carry On England	Officer
1977	Holocaust 2000	Robertson
1978	Carry On Emmannuelle	French Parson
1979	Suez 1956	The Speaker
1980	Between the Covers	Charles
1980	George and Mildred	Casino Supervisor
1990	A Ghost in Monte Carlo	Concierge

== Television roles ==
Year	Title	Role	Notes
1962	The Probation Officer	Peter	1 episode
1962	Emergency-Ward 10	Angus MacGregor	6 episodes
1962	Dixon of Dock Green	Ken Crocker	Episode: "The Milkman Knocks on Friday"
1962	Ghost Squad	Tim Casey	Episode: "Quarantine a Kavar"
1963	24-Hour Call	Jeweller	Episode: "Never Leave Me"
1963	The Plane Makers	Rowland Jessup	Episode: "The Short Run"
1963	Suspense	Philip Hale	Episode: "The White Hot Coal"
1963-1970	Dr. Finlay's Casebook	Various	3 episodes
1964	Taxi!	George	Episode: "Sunday Mornings Are for Sleeping"
1964	Kidnapped	Lieutenant	Episode: "In the Hands of the Ladies"
1964	Z Cars	Factory Worker	Episode: "Welcome Home, Jigger"
1964, 1967	No Hiding Place	Barber/Charlie White	2 episodes
1965	Story Parade	Basil Jaraby	Episode: "The Old Boys"
1965	Compact	Ross Bennett	2 episodes
1965	The Flying Swan	Rogers, of The Sunday Star	Episode: "The Age of Consent"
1965	The Troubleshooters	Actor	Episode: "Meet Miss Mogul"
1965	The Scales of Justice	Waller	Episode: "The Material Witness"
1966	The Idiot	Baron S.	2 episodes
1966	The Liars	Butler	1 episode
1966	Theatre 625	Medvedenko	2 episodes
1966	A Game of Murder	Leonard Lincoln	4 episodes
1966	The Wednesday Play	Evangelist	Episode: "Toddler on the Run"
1966	Thirteen Against Fate	Sauvegrain	Episode: "The Widower"
1966	Intrigue	Ranklin	Episode: "Scratch the Surface...and What Do You Find?"
1966	George and the Dragon	Taxi Driver	Episode: "George Meets the Dragon"
1966	The Three Musketeers	King Louis XIII	4 episodes
1966	This Man Craig	Mr Harris	Episode: "The Pirate Cut"
1967	Mr Rose	Danethorpe	Episode: "The Honest Villain"
1967	Love Story	Cinema Manager	Episode: "It's a Long Way to Transylvania"
1967	The Revenue Men	Hayes	Episode: "Evidence Partial and Impartial"
1967	Baker's Half-Dozen	Alex	5 episodes
1968	Pere Goriot	Maxime	Episode: "Gilded Youth"
1969	Fraud Squad	Russell Yarwood	Episode: "Turbot on Ice"
1969	The First Churchills	Vanbrugh	2 episodes
1970	Out of the Past	Granville Sharp	Episode: "The Slave Trade: The Case of Jonathan Strong"
1970	Big Brother	Dr Stockoe	Episode: "There's Always a First Time"
1970	Play for Today	Sir James Brenton	Episode: "The Lie"
1970	The Adventures of Don Quick	TV Announcer	Episode: "People isn't Everything"
1971	Hadleigh	Dr. Phillips	Episode: "Open Verdict"
1971-1973	...And Mother Makes Three	Various	3 episodes
1972	Spyder's Web	Wickering	Episode: "The Hafiz Affair"
1972	Hadleigh	Dr Phillips	Episode: "Open Verdict"
1972	Armchair Theatre	Crown Prince	Episode: "High Summer"
1973	The View from Daniel Pike	Sinclair	Episode: "Credit Where It's Due"
1973	Justice	Hugh	Episode: "The Whole Truth"
1974-1976	Man About the House	Mr Gideon/Barman	7 episodes
1974	Special Branch	Hotel Manager	Episode: "Enter Cordiale"
1974	A Little Bit of Wisdom	Smithers	Episode: "Who Was That Lady?"
1975	Love Thy Neighbour	Julian	Episode: "The Nannies"
1975	Carry On Laughing	Ethelbert; Sir Walter Ranleigh; Egbert; Vicar; Major Merridick; Old Man	6 episodes
1975	Edward the Seventh	George Lewis	Episode: "Scandal"
1976-1979	George and Mildred	Various	3 episodes
1977	Miss Jones and Son	Shop Assistant	Episode: "And Father Came Too"
1978	Sexton Blake and the Demon God	Dr Paterson	Part 1
1978	Robin's Nest	Sidney Watkins	Episode: "The Candidate"
1978	The Sweeney	Pierce	Episode: "The Bigger They Are"
1978	The Foundation	George Briscoe	3 episodes
1978	The Losers	Brian	Episode: "The Naming of Parts"
1980	Leap in the Dark	Dr Stuart	Episode: "Poor Jenny"
1980	Shoestring	Florist	Episode: "Looking for Mr. Wright"
1980-1984	Keep It in the Family	Various	4 episodes
1981	Nanny	Webster	Episode: "Innocent Party"
1982, 1984	Never the Twain	Mr. Neville/Mr. Fortescue	2 episodes
1983	Bergerac	Frazer	Episode: "Almost Like a Holiday"
1983	Luna	Assistant Galactic Co-ordinator	Episode: "Environmental Ambience, Wish You Were Here"
1983	Pictures	Cockburn	5 episodes
1983	The Gaffer	Everard	Episode: "The Council of War"
1984	Minder	Derek	Episode: "Senior Citizen Caine"
1984	Love and Marriage	Malcolm	Anthology series
1984	I Thought You'd Gone	Council Official	1 episode
1984	Cold Warrior	Hotel Manager	Episode: "The Man from Damascus"
1984	Big Deal	Carey	Episode: "Fighting Chance"
1985	Mixed Doubles	Shop Assistant	Episode: "And Mother Came Too"
1985-1990	Taggart	George Cunningham/Paul Cooper	6 episodes
1986	Starting Out	Mr Thompson	Episode: "Prejudice"
1986	All in Good Faith	Bishop of Luton	Episode: "An Eye for an Eye"
1986	Boon	Ted Michaels	Episode: "Unto Us Four a Son"
1986	Mapp & Lucia	Mayberry	Episode: "Au Reservoir"
1986	Fresh Fields	Mr Galloway	Episode: "One Damned Ming After Another"
1987	The Two Mrs. Grenvilles	Forbes	2 episodes
1987	Hardwicke House	Vicar	2 episodes
1987	Queenie	James	1 episode
1987	Slinger's Day	Auditor	Episode: "The Stocktake"
1987	The New Statesman	House of Commons Speaker	3 episodes
1988	After Henry	The Valuer	Episode: "The Teapot"
1988	Chelmsford 123	Poet	2 episodes
1988	Screen Two	Hotel Manager	Episode: "The Temptation of Eileen Hughes"
1988	The Bourne Identity	Stossel	2 episodes
1988	Rumpole of the Bailey	Hector Vellacott Q.C.	Episode: "Rumpole and the Barrow Boy"
1989	Around the World in 80 Days	Forster	3 episodes
1989	Hard Cases	Roger	1 episode
1990	She-Wolf of London	Reverend Parfray	Episode: "The Juggler"
1991	The Upper Hand	Surgeon	Episode: "The Anniversary"
1991	The Darling Buds of May	Reverend Spink	3 episodes
1992	Agatha Christie's Poirot	Dr Bennett	Episode: "One, Two, Buckle My Shoe"
