= Oliver Twist (1985 serial) =

- DVD cover with Eric Porter as Fagin
- Based on: Oliver Twist by Charles Dickens
- Written by: Alexander Baron
- Directed by: Gareth Davies
- Starring: Lysette Anthony; Ben Rodska; Eric Porter; Michael Attwell; Godfrey James; Frank Middlemass
- Theme music composer: Dudley Simpson
- Country of origin: United Kingdom
- Original language: English
- No. of episodes: 12

Production
- Producer: Terrance Dicks
- Running time: 360 minutes

Original release
- Network: BBC1
- Release: 13 October – 29 December 1985

Oliver Twist is a 1985 BBC TV serial. It was produced by Terrance Dicks, directed by Gareth Davies, and adapted by Alexander Baron from the 1838 novel by Charles Dickens. This version follows the book more closely than any of the other film adaptions.

== Plot ==
For a detailed plot, see Oliver Twist.

== Cast ==
- Eric Porter - Fagin
- Michael Attwell - Bill Sikes
- Ben Rodska - Oliver Twist
- Amanda Harris - Nancy
- Godfrey James - Mr Bumble
- Frank Middlemass - Mr Brownlow
- Lysette Anthony - Rose Maylie / Agnes Fleming (Anthony had previously played Oliver's mother in the 1982 adaptation of the novel.)
- Pip Donaghy - Monks
- David Garlick - The Artful Dodger (Garlick had previously played the Dodger on Broadway and West End revivals of Oliver!)
- Nicholas Bond-Owen - Charley Bates
- David King - Giles
- Gillian Martell - Mrs Maylie
- Edward Burnham - Mr Grimwig
- Julian Firth - Noah Claypole
- Miriam Margolyes - Mrs Corney (later Mrs Bumble)
- Raymond Witch - Mr Sowerberry
- Terry Molloy - Brittles
- Christian Rodska - Barney
- Dominic Jephcott - Harry Maylie
- Carys Llewelyn - Charlotte
- Christopher Driscoll - Toby Crackit
- Janet Henfrey - Martha
- David McKail - Doctor Losberne
- Scott Funnell - Young Oliver Twist
