= City '68 =

- Genre: Drama
- Written by: John Finch; H. V. Kershaw (as Harry Kershaw)
- Composer: Derek Hilton
- Country of origin: United Kingdom
- No. of episodes: 20

Production
- Executive producers: H. V. Kershaw; Peter Willes
- Producers: John Finch; H. V. Kershaw
- Running time: 20 x 60 minutes
- Production company: Granada Television

Original release
- Network: ITV
- Release: 1967 – 1968

City '68 is a UK 60 minute television anthology series of dramas about the emerging problems of a city. It was created by H.V. Kershaw and produced by Granada Television. Twenty episodes aired from 1967 to 1968.

Directors included Michael Apted and Mike Newell.

Among its cast were Roy Barraclough, John Bluthal, Geoffrey Chater, Kenneth Colley, Harry H. Corbett, Hugh Cross, Rosalie Crutchley, Diana Coupland, Windsor Davies, Norman Eshley, Jon Finch, Bernard Hepton, Vivien Heilbron, Ronald Hines, Bernard Horsfall, Yootha Joyce, Phyllida Law, Bernard Lee, Desmond Llewelyn, Brian Miller, Geoffrey Palmer, Siân Phillips, Robert Powell, June Ritchie, Martin Shaw, Gerald Sim, Frank Thornton, Wanda Ventham, John Welsh

The series has survived intact, although only two production photographs are available to the public.
