= Yootha Joyce =

British actress (1927–1980)

- Joyce on the sleeve of "Some Girls Are Bigger Than Others" by the Smiths, 1986
- Born: Yootha Joyce Needham; 20 August 1927; Wandsworth, London, England
- Died: 24 August 1980 (aged 53); Marylebone, London, England
- Education: Royal Academy of Dramatic Art
- Occupation: Actress
- Years active: 1944–1980
- Spouse: Glynn Edwards (m. 1956; div. 1969)

Yootha Joyce Needham (20 August 1927 – 24 August 1980), known as Yootha Joyce, was a British actress best known for playing Mildred Roper opposite Brian Murphy in the sitcom Man About the House (1973–1976) and its spin-off George and Mildred (1976–1979). She had a large number of film and television credits to her name, and also made many appearances on stage.

== Early life ==
Yootha Joyce Needham was born in Wandsworth, London, the only child of musical parents Percival "Hurst" Needham, a singer, and Jessie Maud (née Revitt), a concert pianist. She was named "Yootha" after a New Zealand dancer in her father's touring company, a name she would later say she "loathed and detested". Joyce's biography states that her heavily pregnant mother went for a walk on Wandsworth Common during an interval of one of her husband's performances and began feeling contractions; searching for a house to call an ambulance, she came across a nursing home, where she gave birth.

The family lived in a basement flat at Bennerley Road, Wandsworth, although Joyce spent much time living with her maternal grandmother, Jessie Rebecca Revitt, while her parents were touring. Initially educated at the Battersea Central Co-educational School, Joyce was evacuated at the start of the Second World War to Petersfield, Hampshire, where she attended Petersfield County High School for Girls. Although Joyce later said that she "hated" her time in Petersfield, she and the other female evacuees from Battersea would use the local church hall there for acting, dancing and singing. By the time Joyce returned to London in 1941 her parents resided in Gladstone Road in Croydon, joined by her grandmother. She completed her education at Croydon High School.

Joyce's family were not encouraging of her career. She could not sing or play the piano like her parents, who stated she "wasn't much good at anything"; however, inspired by her performances at Petersfield, Joyce became determined to "break family tradition [...] and become a straight dramatic actress". Despite her parents' disdain, Joyce successfully auditioned for a place at the Royal Academy of Dramatic Art (RADA), beginning in September 1944, alongside Roger Moore. Her first performance was playing Lydia Bennet in a production of Pride and Prejudice.

Undeterred by her director saying that she "had nothing to offer the profession", Joyce began working as an assistant stage manager at The Grand in Croydon during the summer holidays, and joined a repertory company where she starred in productions including Escape Me Never and Autumn Crocus. Starting back at RADA in September 1945, Joyce dropped the "Needham" from her name and began using the stage name "Yootha Joyce" saying "it seemed less of a mouthful... being stuck with Yootha is enough". Joyce left RADA in early 1946, finding it unduly strict and unencouraging.

== Career ==
=== Early roles and repertory theatre ===
Following her departure from RADA, Joyce toured with ENSA from 1946 to 1948. She then toured the UK in many repertory theatre groups, including the Harry Kendall Players, the Reginald Salberg Players, the Jack Rose Players and the Harry Hanson Players, and received many positive reviews of her performances. In 1955, Joyce applied for work at a further repertory group based at the King's Theatre in Gainsborough, Lincolnshire in a production entitled The Call of the Flesh. The producer, Glynn Edwards, accepted her audition and the two became good friends, and later lovers. Touring the UK in The Call of the Flesh the play was billed as "daring", "naked", "raw" and "gripping" and was a huge success. The theatre director Joan Littlewood was in the audience at one of the performances and was impressed to the extent that she asked Edwards to join her Theatre Workshop at the Theatre Royal, Stratford East.

=== Theatre Workshop ===
By 1956, Joyce and Edwards had moved in together and rented a flat in Hampstead. During one of Littlewood's productions, Littlewood began looking for more female parts and Edwards suggested Joyce. She joined the production and became a member of the Theatre Workshop alongside other contemporaries including Barbara Windsor, Murray Melvin, Victor Spinetti, Bob Grant, Stephen Lewis, and Brian Murphy at the Theatre Royal Stratford East. Joyce married Edwards on 8 December 1956, and would later divorce in 1969.. Joyce took part in a large number of Littlewood's productions, as a performer but also occasionally as producer or director. Her roles at the Theatre Workshop included The Duchess of Malfi, Celestina, The Respectful Prostitute, The Dutch Courtesan and The Hostage.

Joyce came to prominence in Fings Ain't Wot They Used T'Be in which she played three roles. The production began at the Theatre Royal before transferring to the Garrick Theatre in London's West End where it ran for 886 performances.

=== Film and television roles ===
Joyce made her first television appearance in 1962 in an episode of Brothers in Law, a sitcom about a young lawyer, alongside a young Richard Briers, and went on to make her film debut in Littlewood's film Sparrows Can't Sing (1963).

In the 1960s and 1970s, Joyce became a familiar face in many one-off sitcom roles and supporting parts in films. Joyce's next film part was that of a cameo role in Jack Clayton's The Pumpkin Eater (1964) as a psychotic young woman opposite Anne Bancroft, delivering a performance that has been called one of the "best screen acting miniatures one could hope to see." Joyce appeared in two episodes of the comedy series Steptoe and Son, as the girlfriend of Harold Steptoe. She also appeared in the Hammer Horror film Fanatic (1965) as a villain, and then had a role in the films Catch Us If You Can (1965) - a vehicle for the Dave Clark Five - and A Man for All Seasons (1966). Joyce then had a role as brassy housekeeper Mrs Quayle in Clayton's next film Our Mother's House (1967), a dark drama starring Dirk Bogarde. Joyce also took a leading role opposite Robert Shaw in the television film Luther. Joyce played villains in the television series The Saint and The Avengers, and then followed this with a role in the sitcom George and the Dragon opposite Sid James. Joyce also had a role in the film Charlie Bubbles (1968).

Joyce's first main recurring role was that of Miss Argyll, the frustrated girlfriend of the star Milo O'Shea, in three series of Me Mammy (1968–1971); most of the episodes of that series are lost. She had a role in the short film Twenty-Nine (1969) and appeared in five episodes of Dixon of Dock Green. Joyce appeared in the horror films The Night Digger (1971), and Burke & Hare (1972). She followed this with a role in Jason King as a villainous nurse.

Joyce then had roles in the TV spin-off films Nearest and Dearest (1972), Never Mind the Quality Feel the Width (1973) and Steptoe and Son Ride Again (1973). Shortly after, she played a hospital matron in the television film Frankenstein: The True Story (1973) alongside Jane Seymour and David McCallum. She also appeared as customer Mrs. Scully in the pilot episode of Open All Hours, and as militant clippie Jessie Crawford in an episode of On the Buses (both 1973). In 1973, Joyce also appeared in a series of television commercials for the Yorkshire Post with Tommy Godfrey.

=== Man About the House and George and Mildred ===
It was not until 1973 that Joyce acquired a starring role, when she was cast as man-hungry Mildred Roper, wife of sub-letting landlord George, in the sitcom Man About the House. This series, which starred Richard O'Sullivan, Paula Wilcox, Sally Thomsett, and Brian Murphy as George Roper, ran until 1976, deriving its comic narrative from two young women and a young man sharing the flat above the Ropers. Man About the House became a hit, with audiences of up to twenty-four million viewers per episode. The series also spawned a spin-off film which was released in 1974.

When the Man About the House ended, a spin-off was written that featured the Ropers as the main characters: George and Mildred, which was first broadcast in 1976. The couple were seen moving from the London house in Myddleton Terrace in the previous programme, and into a newer suburban property in Peacock Crescent, Hampton Wick. Much of the new series centred on Mildred's desire to better herself in her new surroundings and climb the social ladder, but always being thwarted, usually unwittingly, by her ineffectual husband's desire for a quiet life.

Like its predecessor, George and Mildred was a huge success, running for a total of five series between 1976 and 1979. In the 1976-1977 festive period, Joyce and Murphy appeared as ugly sisters "Georgina" and "Mildred" in the London Palladium's pantomime of Cinderella which sold over half a million tickets in advance and had to be extended for a further three weeks due to its popularity. From 1977 to 1978, they reprised their roles as George and Mildred in a stage version of the show, which toured the UK in various theatres, including a summer season at Bournemouth's Pier Theatre. In 1979, Joyce and Murphy toured Australia and New Zealand in the stage show.

Joyce was named the Best Actress in the 1976 Sun Awards, won the title of Funniest Lady on Television in the 1976-1977 TV Times Awards, and was awarded the joint TV Personality of the Year for 1976 together with Brian Murphy by the Variety Club of Great Britain.

Although other dramatic roles eluded her, Joyce appeared frequently on gameshows and chatshows on television, as well as opening public buildings, events and facilities, often with Murphy. Following the fifth series of George and Mildred, a feature film version was shot in 1980. Concerned over typecasting, Joyce began to tire of the 'Mildred' role, and expressed her desire to move on to other work, as did Murphy with the role of 'George'. Joyce, Murphy and the producers agreed that a sixth and final series would be made of George and Mildred which was due to be filmed in August 1980.

== Personal life ==
Joyce married actor Glynn Edwards in 1956. She would confide in Edwards that her greatest fear was being without work, and that she thought every job she had would be her last. Joyce and Edwards divorced in 1969 but remained close friends, to the extent that she used to console him after his subsequent relationships broke down.

In 1975, Joyce began a relationship with Terry Lee Dixon, the tour manager of the play Boeing-Boeing in which she starred, who was twenty years her junior. The relationship drew much media attention due to their age gap; they separated in 1978 after Dixon began an affair with a younger woman.

An animal lover since childhood, Joyce became heavily involved with the National Canine Defence League (now the Dogs Trust), contributing to their fundraisers, events and newsletters. Joyce was also a passionate animal rights advocate and adopted numerous rescue animals, including dogs, cats, horses and donkeys over her life. Joyce was also involved with several other charities and good causes. During the 1970s, Joyce maintained a home in London, but also owned an apartment in Nerja in Andalusia, Spain.

== Final years, health and death ==
Joyce was affected by her long-term alcoholism.

A feature film version of George and Mildred (1980) was her last work. Friends noticed that Joyce had become increasingly withdrawn, lower in mood and had become thin and frail, weighing just under seven stone. Amidst growing concern over her health, she was admitted to hospital in the summer of 1980 after collapsing at home. Joyce died in hospital of liver failure shortly after her 53rd birthday on 24 August 1980. Her co-star and good friend Brian Murphy was at her bedside. Joyce's funeral took place on 3 September 1980 at Golders Green Crematorium, where she was cremated. Her ashes were scattered on the crocus lawn in the grounds of the crematorium.

At the inquest into Joyce's death, it was revealed that she had been drinking up to half a bottle of brandy a day for ten years and recently very much more, and that she had, in the words of her lawyer Mario Uziell-Hamilton, become a victim of her own success, and dreaded the thought of being typecast as Mildred Roper. The pathologist stated that Joyce's liver was twice the normal size and that her heart and lungs had also suffered because of her drinking; Joyce's cause of death was given as portal cirrhosis of the liver. Joyce's biography implies that she turned to drink to steady her nerves, particularly after her divorce and subsequent failed relationships, loneliness, typecasting, lack of other work, and lack of privacy due to the popularity of Mildred Roper, and had become depressed.

Joyce appeared posthumously in her last recorded television performance, duetting with Max Bygraves on his variety show Max, singing "For All We Know". The episode was aired on 14 January 1981. Actor and comedian Kenneth Williams wrote in his diary of the performance that "she looked as though she was crying... as she got up [and left the set] one had the feeling she never intended to return." He also went on to mention her in a later entry in his diary (9 April 1988, just days before his own death) that "there was a break in her voice when she got to [the line] tomorrow may never come... she was a lady who made so many people happy and a lady who never complained".

== Legacy ==
In 1986, The Smiths used an image of Joyce on the sleeve of their UK single release "Ask" and the German release of "Some Girls Are Bigger Than Others", thereby adding her to what would become a significant set of musical releases, made iconic by their design (other Smiths 'cover stars' included Truman Capote, Alain Delon, Terence Stamp, Elvis Presley, Pat Phoenix, Alexandra Bastedo, Viv Nicholson, Billie Whitelaw and Shelagh Delaney).

In October 2001, a tribute documentary entitled The Unforgettable Yootha Joyce was broadcast by ITV, which featured Glynn Edwards as well as many of her co-stars and friends, including Sally Thomsett, Brian Murphy, Nicholas Bond-Owen and Norman Eshley, talking about memories and their relationships with Joyce.

In 2014, a biography was written by Paul Curran, entitled Dear Yootha... The Life of Yootha Joyce, to which contributions were made by those who knew and worked with her, including Glynn Edwards, Murray Melvin and Barbara Windsor. Curran also published The Yootha Joyce Scrapbook, featuring rare and unseen photographs detailing events from Joyce's life in 2015. There was also a third book, entitled Yootha Joyce: Pieces of a Life, published in 2021.

In 2019, a one-woman play depicting Joyce's life, titled Testament of Yootha, was performed by Caroline Burns-Cooke at the Edinburgh Fringe Festival.

== Acting credits ==
=== Film ===
Year	Title	Role	
1963	Sparrows Can't Sing	Yootha	
1963	A Place to Go	Woman in Wash House	Uncredited
1964	The Pumpkin Eater	Woman at Hairdressers	Uncredited
1965	Fanatic	Anna	
1965	Catch Us If You Can	Nan	
1966	Kaleidoscope	Museum Receptionist	
1966	A Man for All Seasons	Avril Machin	
1967	Stranger in the House	Shooting Range Girl	
1967	Our Mother's House	Mrs. Quayle	
1968	Charlie Bubbles	Woman in Cafe	
1968	Luther	Katharina Luther	
1969	Twenty-Nine	The Prostitute	Short film
1970	Fragment of Fear	Miss Ward-Cadbury	
1971	All the Right Noises	Mrs. Bird	
1971	The Road Builder	Mrs. Palafox	
1972	Burke & Hare	Mrs. Hare	
1972	Nearest and Dearest	Rhoda Rowbottom	
1973	Never Mind the Quality, Feel the Width	Mrs. Finch	
1973	Steptoe and Son Ride Again	Freda - Lennie's Wife	
1973	Frankenstein: The True Story	Hospital Matron	
1974	Man About the House	Mildred Roper	
1980	George and Mildred	Mildred Roper	

=== Television ===
Year	Title	Role	Notes
1962	Brothers in Law	Mrs. Trench	Episode: "Separation Order"
1962	Armchair Theatre	Cissy	Episode: "The Fishing Match"
1962	Z-Cars	Clara Smales	Episode: "Full Remission"
1962	Benny Hill	Bella	Episode: "Cry of Innocence"
1963	Corrigan Blake	Abigail	Episode: "The Removal Men"
1963	Benny Hill	Elvira Crudd	Episode: "Mr. Apollo"
1963	Z-Cars	Mrs. Gilroy	Episode: "The Main Chance"
1963	Steptoe and Son	Delia	Episode: "The Bath"
1963	Comedy Playhouse	Mrs. Wilson	Episode: "Impasse"
1963	Comedy Playhouse	Rita	Episode: "A Clerical Error"
1964	The Wednesday Play	Rosalind Arnold	Episode: "The Confidence Course"
1964	ITV Play of the Week	The Woman	Episode: "I Can Walk Where I Like Can't I?"
1964	Dixon of Dock Green	Mrs. Gates	Episode: "Child Hunt"
1964	ITV Play of the Week	Jane Willows	Episode: "A Tricycle Made for Two"
1964	Story Parade	Ruth Cowley	Episode: "A Travelling Woman"
1964	ITV Play of the Week	Vera Maine	Episode: "Gina"
1964	Diary of a Young Man	Mrs. Baggerdagger	Episode: "Money"
1964	Dixon of Dock Green	Mabel Davies	Episode: "The Night Man"
1964	Redcap	Magda	Episode: "A Town Called Love"
1965	Frankie Howerd	Drunk Woman	Episode: #1.6
1965	Dixon of Dock Green	Landlady	Episode: "Forsaking All Others"
1965	Theatre 625	Jane Matthews	Episode: "Try for White"
1965	Cluff	Flo Darby	Episode: "The Convict"
1965	The Wednesday Thriller	Mrs. Seam	Episode: "The Babysitter"
1965	Six of the Best	Doris	Episode: "Charlie's Place"
1965	Steptoe and Son	Avis	Episode: "A Box in Town"
1965	Theatre 625	Miss Binnington	Episode: "Portraits from the North: The Nutter"
1966	Dixon of Dock Green	Joyce Watson	Episode: "You Can't Buy a Miracle"
1966	No Hiding Place	Hilda Myers	Episode: "Ask Me If I Killed Her"
1966	The Saint	Jovanka Milanova	Episode: "The Russian Prisoner"
1966–1967	The Wednesday Play	Miriam Green	3 episodes
1966	George and the Dragon	Irma	Episode: "Merry Christmas"
1967	Turn Out the Lights	Monica Nolan	Episode: "A Big Hand for a Little Lady"
1967	Thirty-Minute Theatre	Agnes	Episode: "Teeth"
1967	The Avengers	Miss Lister	Episode: "Something Nasty In The Nursery"
1967	Market in Honey Lane	Kay Fowler	Episode: "The Birds and the Business"
1967	This Way for Murder	Mrs. Dyberg	Episode: #1.3
1967	Harry Worth	Ingrid	Episode: "Four's a Crush"
1968	City '68	Hilda	Episode: "Love Thy Neighbour"
1968	ITV Playhouse	Phoebe / Mrs. Bewley	Episode: "Your Name's Not God, It's Edgar"
1968–1971	Me Mammy	Miss Eunice Argyll	All 22 episodes
1969	Armchair Theatre	Alice	Episode: "Go on... It'll Do You Good"
1969	BBC Play of the Month	Mademoiselle Motte	Episode: "Maigret at Bay"
1969	ITV Sunday Night Theatre	Erica Seydoux	Episode: "A Measure of Malice"
1969	W. Somerset Maugham	Elvira	Episode: "Lord Mountdrago"
1969	Dixon of Dock Green	Mrs. Harper	Episode: "Reluctant Witness"
1970	Manhunt	Denise	Episode: "Fare Forward, Voyagers"
1970	The Misfit	Pamela	Episode: "On Reading the Small Print"
1970	Conceptions of Murder	Maria Kurten	Episode: "Peter and Maria"
1972	Jason King	Sister Dryker	Episode: "If It's Got to Go - It's Got to Go"
1972	Tales from the Lazy Acre	Mrs. Gaynor	Episode: "The Last Great Pint-Drinking Tournament"
1972	The Fenn Street Gang	Glenda	Episode: "The Woman for Dennis"
1973	Comedy Playhouse	Lil Wilson	Episode: "Home from Home"
1973	Seven of One	Mrs. Scully	Episode: "Open All Hours"
1973	On the Buses	Jessie	Episode: "The Allowance"
1973–1976	Man About the House	Mildred Roper	All 39 episodes
1973	All Star Comedy Carnival	Mildred Roper	Man About the House Christmas sketch
1974	Comedy Playhouse	Unknown	Episode: "Bird Alone" (pilot not broadcast)
1974	The Dick Emery Show	Amelia Chislett	Episode: #13.4
1976–1979	George and Mildred	Mildred Roper	All 38 episodes

=== Theatre ===
(incomplete)

Year	Title	Role	Venue
1945	Pride and Prejudice	Lydia Bennett	
1945	Henry V	Archbishop of Canterbury	
1945	This Happy Breed	Sylvia	
1945	Escape Me Never	Girl	Grand Theatre, Croydon
1945	Autumn Crocus	The Young Lady Living in Sin	Grand Theatre, Croydon
1945	Cymbeline	Imogen	
1945	Heartbreak House	Lady Utterwood	
1946	Pygmalion	Miss Eynsford-Hill	John Gay Theatre, Barnstaple
1946	You Can't Take It with You	Essie	
1946	She Stoops to Conquer	Kate Hardcastle	
1946	They Walk Alone	Emmy Baudine	Butlins Holiday Camp Theatre, Skegness
1946	While the Sun Shines	Unknown	
1946	The Merchant of Venice	Portia	The Athenaeum, Bury St Edmonds
1946–1948	Various tours with ENSA	Various roles	
1948	Humoresque	Peony Barker	
1949	Hay Fever	Unknown	Preston Hippodrome, Preston
1950	Flowers for the Living	Lily Holmes	Stanley Halls, Croydon
1951	Peace Comes to Peckham	Grace	
1951	Nothing but the Truth	Unknown	Theatre Royal, Ashton-under-Lyne
1951	The Light of Heart	Unknown	Theatre Royal, Ashton-under-Lyne
1951	Mountain Air	Unknown	Theatre Royal, Ashton-under-Lyne
1951	Night Must Fall	Olivia Grayne	Theatre Royal, Ashton-under-Lyne
1951	Grand National Night	Babs	Theatre Royal, Ashton-under-Lyne
1951	A Lady Mislaid	Esther	Theatre Royal, Ashton-under-Lyne
1951	The Perfect Woman	Joan Merrifield	Theatre Royal, Ashton-under-Lyne
1951	The Ten-Five Never Stops	Trixy Evans	Theatre Royal, Ashton-under-Lyne
1951	The Seventh Veil	Francesca Cunningham	Theatre Royal, Ashton-under-Lyne
1951	Mother of Men	Lissa	Theatre Royal, Ashton-under-Lyne
1951	The Paragon	Joan	Theatre Royal, Ashton-under-Lyne
1951	Charley's Aunt	Amy	Theatre Royal, Ashton-under-Lyne
1951	The Ghost Train	Unknown	Theatre Royal, Ashton-under-Lyne
1951	The Devil A Saint	Sarah Jane	Theatre Royal, Ashton-under-Lyne
1951	Black Chiffon	Unknown	Theatre Royal, Ashton-under-Lyne
1951	Bed of Roses	Jenny Pickersgill	Theatre Royal, Ashton-under-Lyne
1951	While Parents Sleep	Nanny	Theatre Royal, Ashton-under-Lyne
1951	But Once A Year	Olivia Meldon	Theatre Royal, Ashton-under-Lyne
1951	Pick-Up Girl	Ruby Lockwood	Theatre Royal, Ashton-under-Lyne
1951	Claudia	Claudia Naughton	Theatre Royal, Ashton-under-Lyne
1951	Blithe Spirit	Elvira	Theatre Royal, Ashton-under-Lyne
1951	Doctor Brent's Household	Claire Hutton	Theatre Royal, Ashton-under-Lyne
1951	Black Limelight	Lily James	Theatre Royal, Ashton-under-Lyne
1951	Bed, Board and Romance	Gladys Foster	Theatre Royal, Ashton-under-Lyne
1951	The Bird in Hand	Alice Greenleaf	Theatre Royal, Ashton-under-Lyne
1951	The Light of Heart	Fan	Theatre Royal, Ashton-under-Lyne
1951	The Shining Hour	Mariella Linden	Theatre Royal, Ashton-under-Lyne
1951	The Rotters	Winnie Clugston	Theatre Royal, Ashton-under-Lyne
1951	The Passing of the Third Floor Back	Stasia	Theatre Royal, Ashton-under-Lyne
1951	The Girl Who Couldn't Quite	Pam Taylor	Theatre Royal, Ashton-under-Lyne
1951	Ma's Bit of Brass	Lady Maydew	Theatre Royal, Ashton-under-Lyne
1951	Lets Have a Honeymoon	Lil	Theatre Royal, Ashton-under-Lyne
1951	Love from a Stranger	Cecily Harrington	Theatre Royal, Ashton-under-Lyne
1951	Rain	Mrs. Davidson	Theatre Royal, Ashton-under-Lyne
1951	Cardboard Castle	Annie	Theatre Royal, Ashton-under-Lyne
1951	Loophole	Mrs. Wilson	Theatre Royal, Ashton-under-Lyne
1951	Fly Away Peter	Myra Hapgood	Theatre Royal, Ashton-under-Lyne
1951	What Anne Brought Home	Anne	Theatre Royal, Ashton-under-Lyne
1951	Treasure Island	Mrs. Hawkins	Theatre Royal, Ashton-under-Lyne
1951	The Two Mrs. Carrolls	Mrs. Latham	Theatre Royal, Ashton-under-Lyne
1951	Too Young to Marry	Elaine Bishop	Theatre Royal, Ashton-under-Lyne
1951	Third Time Lucky	Mrs. Scratton	Theatre Royal, Ashton-under-Lyne
1951	The First Mrs. Fraser	Janet Fraser	Theatre Royal, Ashton-under-Lyne
1951	The Family Upstairs	Mrs. Grant	Theatre Royal, Ashton-under-Lyne
1951	The Chiltern Hundreds	June Farrell	Theatre Royal, Ashton-under-Lyne
1951	A Streetcar Named Desire	A Strange Woman	Theatre Royal, Ashton-under-Lyne
1951	Separate Rooms	Linda	Theatre Royal, Ashton-under-Lyne
1952	The Young in Heart	Teenager	Theatre Royal, Ashton-under-Lyne
1952	Heaven and Charing Cross	Lily Norman	Theatre Royal, Ashton-under-Lyne
1952	The Happy Marriage	Unknown	
1953	Wide Boy	Clara	
1953	Charlie's Uncle	Sylvia Chisholm	Palace Theatre, Westcliff-on-Sea
1953	The Gift	Unknown	Palace Theatre, Westcliff-on-Sea
1953	The Deep Blue Sea	Hester Collyer	Palace Theatre, Westcliff-on-Sea
1953	The Happy Prisoner	Farm Girl	Palace Theatre, Westcliff-on-Sea
1953	Our Family	Elinor Winton	Palace Theatre, Westcliff-on-Sea
1953	Widows Are Dangerous	Angela Lawrence	Palace Theatre, Westcliff-on-Sea
1953	Autumn Crocus	The Lady in Spectacles	Palace Theatre, Westcliff-on-Sea
1953	Music for Murder	Priscilla Hunter	Palace Theatre, Westcliff-on-Sea
1953	Queen Elizabeth	Lettice, Dowager Countess of Essex	Palace Theatre, Westcliff-on-Sea
1953	Born Yesterday	Billie Dawn	Palace Theatre, Westcliff-on-Sea
1953	The Outsider	Lalage Sturdee	Palace Theatre, Westcliff-on-Sea
1953	Smilin' Through	Unknown	Palace Theatre, Westcliff-on-Sea
1953	Worm's Eye View	Bella	Palace Theatre, Westcliff-on-Sea
1953	Maiden Ladies	Valerie Ward	Palace Theatre, Westcliff-on-Sea
1953	Murder Mistaken	Freda Jefferies	Palace Theatre, Westcliff-on-Sea
1953	Wild Horses	Iris Ingle	Palace Theatre, Westcliff-on-Sea
1953	Relative Values	Mrs. Moxton	Palace Theatre, Westcliff-on-Sea
1953	Waters of the Moon	Evelyn Daly	Palace Theatre, Westcliff-on-Sea
1953	My Wife's Lodger	Maggie Ann Higginbotham	Palace Theatre, Westcliff-on-Sea
1953	The Man	Ruth	Palace Theatre, Westcliff-on-Sea
1953	Red Letter Day	Jane Cooper	Palace Theatre, Westcliff-on-Sea
1953	I Want to Get Married	Annie Worthington	Palace Theatre, Westcliff-on-Sea
1953	Daughter of My House	Anna	Palace Theatre, Westcliff-on-Sea
1953	Having A Wonderful Time	Phoebe Tootle	Palace Theatre, Westcliff-on-Sea
1953	Glad Tidings	Celia Forester	
1954	Woman of the Year	Arlie Ames	Embassy Theatre, London
1955	The Murder at the Vicarage	Anne Protheroe	Bristol Hippodrome, Bristol
1955	The Call of the Flesh	Stella Loman	UK Tour
1956	The Good Soldier Švejk	Unknown	Theatre Royal Stratford East
1957	The Playboy of the Western World	Susan Brady	Theatre Royal Stratford East
1957	The Duchess of Malfi	Julia	Theatre Royal Stratford East
1957	By Candlelight	Unknown	
1957	The Rainmaker	Unknown	Theatre Royal, Bath
1958	Black Chiffon	Thea	Opera House, Cheltenham
1958	The Murder at the Vicarage	Unknown	Opera House, Cheltenham
1958	Rebecca	Mrs. Danvers	Opera House, Cheltenham
1958	The Reluctant Debutante	Unknown	Opera House, Cheltenham
1958	Paddle Your Own Canoe	Unknown	Opera House, Cheltenham
1958	The Reluctant Debutante	Unknown	Opera House, Cheltenham
1958	Celestina	Lucrezia	Theatre Royal Stratford East
1958	The Respectful Prostitute	Lizzie	Theatre Royal Stratford East
1958	A Christmas Carol	Mrs. Trossit; Ghost of Christmas Past	Theatre Royal Stratford East
1959	Fings Ain't Wot They Used T'Be	The Brass Upstairs; Myrtle; Policewoman	Theatre Royal Stratford East
1959	The Dutch Courtesan	Mistress Mulligrub	Theatre Royal Stratford East
1959	The Hostage	Colette	Theatre Royal Stratford East
1960–1962	Fings Ain't Wot They Used T'Be	The Brass Upstairs; Myrtle; Policewoman	Garrick Theatre, London
1964	Signpost to Murder	Sally Thomas	Castle Theatre, Farnham
1967	The Man in the Glass Booth	Mrs. Rosen	St Martin's Theatre, London
1972	The Londoners	Bridgie Judd	Theatre Royal Stratford East
1975	Boeing-Boeing	Bertha	UK Tour
1976–1977	Cinderella	Mildred Hardup	London Palladium
1977–1978	George and Mildred	Mildred Roper	UK Tour
1979	George and Mildred	Mildred Roper	Australia and New Zealand Tour
