= Sally Thomsett =

English actress (born 1950)

- Born: 3 April 1950 (age 76); Brighton, East Sussex, England
- Years active: 1964–present
- Spouses: Nigel Newman (m. 1971; div. 1976) Claus Hede Nielsen (m. 1980; sep. 1984)
- Partner: Paul Agnew (1993–present)
- Children: 1

Sally Thomsett (born 3 April 1950) is an English former actress who starred as Phyllis in the film The Railway Children (1970) and played Jo in the TV sitcom Man About the House (1973–1976). She also appeared as Janice in the film Straw Dogs (1971) and Nemo in Baxter! (1973).

== Early life ==
Thomsett was born 3 April 1950 in Brighton, East Sussex, to Maurice and Dorothy Thomsett (née Joy) and had three older brothers. She attended Elm Grove Infants and Juniors School in Brighton. One of her brothers offered her five shillings to audition for The Max Bygraves Summer Show. After doing so successfully, she appeared in several pantomimes until she left secondary school to attend Phildene Stage School in London.

== Career ==
Out of drama school, Thomsett made several films for the Children's Film Foundation, and appeared in many popular television series, including Theatre 625, Dixon of Dock Green, Nearest and Dearest and Z-Cars. She also starred as Jennifer Villiers in the comedy series The Very Merry Widow from 1967 to 1968, and its spin-off, The Very Merry Widow and How in 1969.

=== The Railway Children ===
Thomsett was cast as Phyllis in The Railway Children despite the character being 11 years old and Thomsett being 20 at the time of filming. Jenny Agutter, who played her elder sister Bobbie in the film, was two years younger than Thomsett. Thomsett was contractually forbidden to reveal her age during production, and was likewise not allowed to smoke, drink, drive a car, or be seen in public with her boyfriend. The film crew were unaware of her true age, and treated her as they would a child (e.g. by giving her sweets), while addressing the younger Agutter as they would an adult. During an appearance shortly afterwards on a BBC children's television programme, Thomsett was told, "I wouldn't dream of asking a lady her age, but you're obviously quite a bit older than the part you played in the film". She received a nomination for the BAFTA Film Award for Newcomer to Leading Film Roles.

=== Later career ===
Thomsett went on to appear in The Fenn Street Gang and Softly, Softly: Task Force before starring in the psychological thriller film Straw Dogs opposite Dustin Hoffman and Susan George, as well as Baxter! with Britt Ekland. After appearing in a television commercial advertising Bovril in 1972, Thomsett was spotted by writers Brian Cooke and Johnnie Mortimer, who cast her in the hit ITV sitcom Man About the House as Jo, a role that she played for the show's entire run from 1973 to 1976, including a 1974 spin-off film of the same name. In 1975, Thomsett toured the UK in a production of the play Boeing-Boeing with her Man About the House co-stars Richard O'Sullivan, Yootha Joyce and Doug Fisher.

After Man About the House ended in 1976, Thomsett continued to act, appearing in Wodehouse Playhouse in 1978. After appearing in a Crunchie chocolate bars advert in 1979, Thomsett stopped acting to travel the world. She returned in the mid-1980s and appeared on stage in a 1987 production of The Cat and the Canary, before making regular pantomime appearances. She also appeared in the music video for "Doctor in Distress", a charity single made to save Doctor Who from cancellation in 1985. Thomsett's career slowed down after the birth of her daughter, although she did appear on stage in 1998 and 1999 in a touring production of The Holly and the Ivy.

Thomsett appeared in Peter Pan as Mrs. Darling at Doncaster Racecourse during the 2014–2015 Christmas season.

== Personal life ==
In 1971, Thomsett married her boyfriend of five years Nigel Newman, but they separated later that year and subsequently divorced in 1976. She also had a three-year relationship with her co-star Richard O'Sullivan during the production of Man About the House and dated Eddie Kidd in the late 1970s.

Thomsett married Danish film producer Claus Hede Nielsen in 1980, but they separated in 1984. Since 1993, Thomsett has been in a relationship with Paul Agnew, with whom she has one daughter, born in 1996.

== Filmography ==
=== Film ===
Year	Title	Role	Notes
1964	Seventy Deadly Pills	Gerty	
1967	Danny the Dragon	Jean	
1967	River Rivals	Penny Holmes	
1970	The Railway Children	Phyllis Waterbury	
1971	Straw Dogs	Janice Hedden	
1973	Baxter!	Nemo Newman	
1974	Man About the House	Jo	

=== Television ===
Year	Title	Role	Notes
1965	Dead End Creek	Jane	TV series
1965	Theatre 625	Parsons' girl	"The World of George Orwell: 1984"
1966	David Copperfield	Agnes Wickfield	"Distant Relations"
1966	Thirty-Minute Theatre	Christine	"Don't Go Down to the Bingo Mother, Father's Coming to Tea"
1967	River Rivals	Penny Holmes	TV series
1967	Sanctuary	Maria Gomes	"The Promised Land"
1967–68	The Very Merry Widow	Jennifer Villiers	TV series
1968	What Maisie Knew	Maisie	"Shuttlecock", "Flight", "Pursuit and Capture"
1968	For Amusement Only	Letty	"A Little Milk of Human Kindness"
1969	The Very Merry Widow and How	Jennifer Villiers	"How Far Can You Go?", "How About the Patter of Tiny Feet?"
1969	The Gold Robbers	Sally Hartford	TV miniseries
1969	Nearest and Dearest	Brenda	"The Birds and the Bees"
1969	Dixon of Dock Green	Karen	"Notify If Found"
1969–70	Take Three Girls	Wendy Pond	"Devon Violets", "Roses Round the Door"
1970	Wicked Woman	Natalie	"Madeleine Jury"
1970	Z-Cars	Rita	"Bottoms Up for the Walking Dead: Parts 1 & 2"
1970	Softly, Softly: Task Force	Susan	"Lessons"
1970	Play of the Month	Pamela Harrington	"Five Finger Exercise"
1971	Doomwatch	Judy Franklin	"By the Pricking of My Thumbs..."
1971	The Fenn Street Gang	Kathleen	"Horses for the Courses"
1971	Shirley's World	Catronia MacDonald	"The Islanders"
1972	ITV Sunday Night Theatre	Linda Nichols	"When the Wheel Turns"
1973	Comedy Playhouse	Miranda Elms	"Marry the Girls"
1973	Oh, Father!	Mary	"Just Impediment"
1973	All Star Comedy Carnival	Jo	TV film
1973–1976	Man About the House	Jo	Main role
1978	Wodehouse Playhouse	Celia Todd	"Tangled Hearts"
2023	Man About The House: 50 Years of Laughter	Herself	Documentary
