= Nicholas Bond-Owen =

British actor

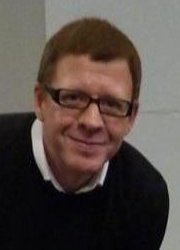
- Born: 13 November 1968 (age 57); Ashford, Surrey, England, UK
- Spouse: Heidi Bond-Owen (?-present)
- Children: 2
- Parent(s): Diane Owen; Sid Owen

Nicholas Bond-Owen (born 13 November 1968) (sometimes billed as Nick or Nicholas Owen) is a British child actor of the 1970s and 1980s best known for playing Tristram Fourmile in all five series of the popular comedy George and Mildred and in the film of the same name.

== Biography ==
Born in Ashford, Surrey in 1968 as Nicholas Owen, to parents Diane and Sid Owen, he got into acting by accident after his older brother signed with a child model agency. As there were already several people with the name Nicholas Owen registered as actors with Equity, he needed to pick a new name. As a fan of James Bond he chose 'Bond' and so became Bond-Owen. He went to school at Abbotsford County Secondary school in Ashford (Surrey) from 1981-85 and then on to Spelthorne College until 1986, where he studied Photography.

His first film role was as Kevin in Confessions from a Holiday Camp (1977). Other film appearances included Little Boy in Rhubarb Rhubarb (1980), Tristram Fourmile in George and Mildred (1980), and Freddie in Lassiter (1984) with Tom Selleck.

His television roles included Tristram Fourmile in George and Mildred (1976–79), Park Ranger with Richard Gibson (1979), Alan Shaw in Airline (1982), Peterkin in The Coral Island (1983), Charley Bates in Oliver Twist (1985), Graham in an episode of Dramarama (1986), First Boy in David Copperfield (1986), and Derek, a troubled teenager in an episode of the schools' series Starting Out (1986). In 2001, he was interviewed for the documentary The Unforgettable Yootha Joyce during which he reminisced about working with the actress Yootha Joyce.

Bond-Owen also appeared in television adverts for McDonald's, Barclays, Halifax Building Society, Cadbury's Flake and British Gas.

In 1987, aged 19, he stopped acting and for nearly 17 years worked for Penguin Books in all departments from courier to distributions manager. For 10 months he worked in the same capacity for Pearson Books and in 2014 was the distribution director for the free newspaper City A.M..

== Personal life ==
Bond-Owen lives with his wife Heidi. He has two sons.

== Filmography ==
Year	Title	Role	Notes
1977	Confessions from a Holiday Camp	Kevin	
1980	Rhubarb Rhubarb	Little Boy	
1980	George and Mildred	Tristram Fourmile	
1984	Lassiter	Freddie	
2017	Ghetto Heaven	Pete Wilkins	

== Television roles ==
Year	Title	Role	Notes
1976-1979	George and Mildred	Tristram Fourmile	All episodes
1979	Park Ranger	Jamie Dutton	1 episode
1982	Airline	Alan Shaw	2 episodes
1983	The Coral Island	Peterkin	All episodes
1985	Oliver Twist	Charley Bates	8 episodes
1986	Starting Out	Derek Barnes	1 episode
1986	Comrade Dad	Man (no name)	1 episode
1986	Dramarama	Graham	1 episode
1986	David Copperfield	1st Boy	2 episodes
