= Lovable rogue =

Stock character

The lovable rogue is a fictional stock character, often from a working-class upbringing, who tends to recklessly defy social norms and social conventions, but who still evokes empathy from the audience or other characters.

== Description ==
=== Character stereotypes ===
The lovable rogue is generally male and is often trying to "beat the system" and better himself through unusual or immoral means. If the protagonist of a story is also a lovable rogue, he is frequently deemed an antihero. The lovable rogue's wild disposition is viewed not as repulsive and alarming so much as exciting and adventurous. Some examples of this include snide or arrogant remarks, brawn over brains (yet challenging calls to action with wit before brawn), using their gut instincts to get out of hostility if personal profit is at stake, perhaps they love themselves more than women, thinking fast and talking faster, as well as having aspirations for a better life. The lovable rogue is generally regarded as handsome or attractive and his daredevil attitude further makes him sexually desirable to other characters. He often has a fiery temper and is streetwise—possessing practical knowledge—usually having self-taught and never been educated in a formal setting.

=== Motives and morality ===
Lovable rogues are not the standard paragons of virtue because they frequently break the law or seem to act for their own personal profit; however, they are charming or sympathetic enough to convince the audience to root for them. As with the case of George Wickham in Pride and Prejudice, authors may even intentionally write them that way in order to hide the fact that they are a villain from readers until this information becomes necessary to plot.

Although they appear at first to act only for personal gain or to break the law needlessly, lovable rogues are often justified in these actions later on due to some ethical motivation that had not yet been revealed at the time or, at least, have the capacity to atone for their wrongdoings. Many lovable rogues are simply prone to being misled when making ethical decisions, while others who appear to act unethically actually maintain a flexible and complicated but legitimate code of ethics.

Despite his common external appearance of selfishness, foolhardiness, or emotional detachment, the lovable rogue may in fact strongly associate with a highly idealistic belief system and understand the concept of a code of honor so highly valued that it transcends normal social constraints such as conformity, tradition, or the law. This sense of an internalized, personal code is usually what makes the lovable rogue lovable, since it serves to confirm that he is moral whereas he may have appeared at first glance to be immoral. The lovable rogue, thus, is not a villain, because he has either a sincere, strong sense of morality (though he may be unwilling to expose it) or has the definite potential for establishing such a moral sense. In addition, his tendency to violate norms may be regarded as a positive trait—having a highly individualistic, creative, or self-reliant personality.

== See also ==
Similar characters

- Outlaw (stock character)
- Social bandits

Rogue-related articles

- Eavesdrop
- Defector
- Sabotage
- Status symbol
- Bad boy (archetype)
- Rake (stock character)
