= Doug Fisher (actor) =

English actor (1941–2000)

- Fisher in 1968
- Born: Douglas Marjoribanks Fisher; 20 September 1941; London, England
- Died: 9 July 2000 (aged 58); London, England
- Occupation: Actor
- Years active: 1964–2000

Douglas Marjoribanks Fisher (London, England, 20 September 1941 – 9 July 2000) was an English actor best known for playing Larry Simmonds in Man About the House (1973–1976), Sammy in the films The Stud (1978) and The Bitch (1979) and Jim Medhurst in London's Burning (1988–1993).

== Early life ==
He graduated from St Edmund Hall, Oxford in 1966, with a degree in French and Russian.

== Career ==
He portrayed Larry Simmonds, the lovable rogue who occupied the attic apartment in the ITV sitcom Man About the House and played Sammy in the films The Stud (1978) and The Bitch (1979), opposite Joan Collins. He also appeared in All Our Saturdays, Yes Minister, Home to Roost, Sorry!, Haggard, Close to Home, Goodnight Sweetheart, The Upper Hand and Heartbeat. His final role was a clergyman in the 1999 miniseries adaptation of Oliver Twist.

He also played the role of Jim Medhurst (Kevin Medhurst's father) In TV series London's Burning from 1988 until the character was killed off in series 6 in 1993. Fisher appeared as habitual criminal Stephen Grismal in the Jonathan Creek episode The Wrestler's Tomb, in 1997.

== Personal life ==
Fisher had a relationship with actress Susan Penhaligon in the early 1980s.

== Death ==
On 9 July 2000, Fisher died of a heart attack aged 58.

== Filmography ==
=== Film ===
Year	Title	Role	Notes
1969	The Smashing Bird I Used to Know	Young Man	
1974	Man About the House	Larry Simmonds	
1978	The Stud	Sammy	
1979	The Bitch	Sammy	
1996	Street Gun	Big G	
1999	The Naked Man	Viking	

=== Television ===
Year	Title	Role	Notes
1966	Blackmail	Cedric Delamore	Episode: "Boys and Girls Commute to Play"
1970	Father, Dear Father	Leslie	Episode: "A Man About the House"
1970	His and Hers	Landlord	Episode: "Morals"
1971	That's Your Funeral	Alf	Episode: "Unholy Deadlock"
1971	Take Three Girls	Henry	Episode: "The Private Sector"
1971	Comedy Playhouse	Tom Potts	Episode: "The Importance of Being Hairy"
1972	The Strauss Family	Girardi	2 episodes
1972	Cheap at Half the Price	Charlie	TV film
1973	The Adventurer	Don Merrick	Episode: "Make It a Million"
1973	All Our Saturdays	Ronnie Rendell	5 episodes
1973	Hunter's Walk	Dennis Kenwright	Episode: "Disturbance"
1973–1976	Man About the House	Larry Simmonds	19 episodes
1973	Helen: A Woman of Today	Larry	Episode: "Harold"
1973	Thirty Minutes Worth	Various	Episode: #3.8
1974	The Protectors	Tom Watt	Episode: "The Tiger and the Goat"
1975	Whodunnit?	Dennis Rogers	Episode: "Beware, Wet Paint"
1978	A Soft Touch	Len	Episode: "I Wanna Be like You"
1978	Play for Today	Terry	Episode: "A Touch of the Tiny Hacketts"
1978	BBC2 Play of the Week	Pilkington	Episode: "The Vanishing Army"
1979	Feet First	Hamilton Defries	All 6 episodes
1979	The Other One	Don	Episode: #2.6
1981	BBC2 Playhouse	The Man	Episode: "The Man Who Almost Knew Eamonn Andrews"
1982	BBC2 Playhouse	James	Episode: "Keeping in Touch"
1982	Yes Minister	Ben Stanley	Episode: "The Challenge"
1984	Singles	Rickie	Episode: "Singles' Night"
1984	Ellis Island	Harry Epstein	Episode: #1.1
1985	Full House	Workman	Episode: "May the Best Man Win"
1987–1988	Sorry!	Wurzo	2 episodes
1987	Home to Roost	George	Episode: "Paper Chase"
1988	All in Good Faith	Sam	Episode: "Where My Caravan Has Rested"
1988	Streets Apart	Man in Wine Bar	Episode: #1.5
1988–1993	London's Burning	Jim Medhurst	9 episodes
1989	Close to Home	Ted Woods	Episode: "Helen the Receptionist"
1991	Prime Suspect	Edward Harvey	Episode: "Price to Pay: Part 2"
1991	Singles	Hargreaves	Episode: "Fourth Time Lucky for Dennis Duval"
1991	The Upper Hand	Dan	Episode: "Wheels"
1992	Haggard	Elusive Edward	Episode: "Condemned"
1992	The Bill	Mellor	Episode: "On the Record, Off the Record"
1993	The Detectives	Cabbie	Episode: "Studs"
1993	Fool's Gold: The Story of the Brink's-Mat Robbery	Solicitor	TV film
1994	Pie In The Sky	Mr. Barnet	Episode: "An Innocent Man"
1994	Silk Stalkings	Gunman	Episode: "Reluctant Witness"
1996	The Bill	John Fry	Episode: "Going Guilty"
1997	Goodnight Sweetheart	Stanley	2 episodes
1997	Jonathan Creek	Stephen Grismal	Episode: "The Wrestler's Tomb"
1997	Heartbeat	Trevor Lammas	Episode: "In on the Act"
1999	Oliver Twist	Clergyman	Episode: "Containing Fresh Discoveries"
