= George and Mildred =

British TV sitcom (1976–1979)

- Title screen
- Genre: Sitcom
- Created by: Johnnie Mortimer and Brian Cooke.
- Based on: Man About the House by Johnnie Mortimer and Brian Cooke
- Starring: Yootha Joyce; Brian Murphy; Norman Eshley; Sheila Fearn; Nicholas Bond-Owen; Roy Kinnear
- Theme music composer: Series 1: Johnny Hawksworth; Series 2–5: Roger Webb
- Country of origin: United Kingdom
- Original language: English
- No. of series: 5
- No. of episodes: 38 (list of episodes)

Production
- Running time: 30 minutes (including adverts)
- Production company: Thames Television

Original release
- Network: ITV
- Release: 6 September 1976 – 25 December 1979

Related
- Man About the House; The Ropers

George and Mildred is a British sitcom produced by Thames Television and first aired between 1976 and 1979. It is a spin-off from Man About the House, and starred Brian Murphy and Yootha Joyce as constantly-sparring married couple George and Mildred Roper. The premise of the series had George and Mildred leaving their flat as depicted in Man About the House and moving to a modern, upmarket housing estate in Hampton Wick. Their arrival horrifies their snobbish neighbour Jeffrey Fourmile, a middle-class estate agent who fears the Ropers' presence will devalue his home.

It was written by Johnnie Mortimer and Brian Cooke . Like many British sitcoms, George and Mildred was made into a film. The movie was dedicated to actress Yootha Joyce who died suddenly in August 1980, just as the cast were about to film a sixth and final series.

== Cast ==
=== Main cast ===
- Yootha Joyce as Mildred Roper
- Brian Murphy as George Roper
- Norman Eshley as Jeffrey Fourmile
- Sheila Fearn as Anne Fourmile
- Nicholas Bond-Owen as Tristram Fourmile

=== Recurring guest cast ===
- Avril Elgar as Ethel Pumphrey (8 episodes; all series)
- Reginald Marsh as Humphrey Pumphrey (7 episodes; series 1 to 4)
- Simon Lloyd as Tarquin Fourmile (7 episodes; series 4 and 5)
- Roy Kinnear as Jerry (5 episodes; series 1, series 3 to 5)
- Gretchen Franklin as Mother (4 episodes; series 1, series 3 to 5)
- Mimi De Braie as Consuela (2 episodes; series 3 and 5)
- Jeanette Farrier as Jane (2 episodes; series 1)

== Premise ==
George and Mildred Roper have left their old house after receiving a compulsory purchase order from the council, and move to 46 Peacock Crescent in upmarket Hampton Wick. While Mildred enjoys the chance to better herself in her new surroundings, she is always being thwarted—usually by the lazy, inept and generally unemployed George, who has no interest in climbing the social ladder, and also continues to show a lack of interest in sexual relations with Mildred.

George and Mildred's next-door neighbours are Jeffrey Fourmile, a snobbish estate agent and his wife Ann. Ann and Mildred become good friends, but Jeffrey is frequently irritated by George, with their spats providing much of the show's humour. The Fourmiles have a young son, Tristram, who gets on well with George, much to the chagrin of Jeffrey (particularly because Jeffrey supports the Conservative Party, while George puts socialist ideas into Tristram's head). In series three, Ann gives birth to a second son, Tarquin.

Mildred's snobbish sister Ethel and her rich husband Humphrey occasionally visit, as does Mildred's elderly mother. Having married wealth, Ethel enjoys trying to make Mildred feel inferior by showing off her latest car or fur coat, at which point Mildred often makes subtle digs at Ethel's age, or social status and pretensions. George however, is far less subtle. George's friend Jerry, a jack-of-all-trades and common swindler, also visits occasionally, much to the annoyance of Mildred, to whom Jerry refers as "Mildew". Although some characters and events of Man About the House are mentioned in some episodes, Jerry is the only one who actually appears in George and Mildred.

In the first series, George buys Mildred a Yorkshire Terrier called Truffles after the Ropers are unable to adopt a child (Mildred later registers her with the kennel club as "Truffles duBorbon Fitzwilliam III").

== Props ==
George Roper's 1934 Brough Superior motorcycle combination—shown to regular comic effect in the opening titles of series 2, 3 and 5— was exhibited at the London Motorcycle Museum. It also appeared in the BBC sitcom Dad's Army. In episodes 1-6 of Series 1, George drives a Reliant Regal three-wheeler – which he swaps for a caravan in the episode "Where My Caravan Has Rested". The Fourmiles' car was Ford Granada Mk1 in Series 1–4 changing to a Volvo 240 estate in Series 5.

== Filming locations ==
The exterior shots for the Roper and Fourmile residences were filmed at 46 and 44 Manor Road, Teddington, Middlesex TW11 8AB. Interior scenes were filmed at the nearby Thames Television studios in Teddington.

== Theme music ==
The theme music for the show used from series 2–5 is Graphic Brown by Roger Webb (Media Music Number 22, Multi Images, 1978).

== Stage show ==
During 1977 and 1978, Brian Murphy and Yootha Joyce, toured the UK in a successful stage version of the programme, beginning with the summer season at the Pier Theatre, Bournemouth before moving on to other venues. Reginald Marsh reprised his role as Humphrey for part of the run, with the role being played by Peter Hughes elsewhere on the tour, whilst the role of Ethel was portrayed by Vanda Godsell and then by Dilys Laye. The tour included appearances at The King's Theatre, Edinburgh.

In 1979, Murphy and Joyce toured Australia and New Zealand in the George and Mildred stage show. In the 1976 to 1977 festive season, Murphy and Joyce appeared as the ugly sisters, Georgina and Mildred, in the London Palladium pantomime, Cinderella.

== Film version ==
Following the fifth series, a feature film version of the series was produced in 1980. The film was not written by Cooke and Mortimer but by Dick Sharples. The Fourmiles only played a small role in the film, which focused on George and Mildred celebrating their wedding anniversary, at Mildred's insistence, at an upmarket London hotel. It featured several guest stars including Stratford Johns, Kenneth Cope and Vicki Michelle. The film was neither a critical nor box office success. It was first shown on television on ITV on Christmas Day 1980.

== The end ==
The final caption of the George and Mildred film read "The End – or is it the beginning?" It would prove to be the former as Yootha Joyce died from portal cirrhosis of the liver due to chronic alcoholism on 24 August 1980, before the film was released. Friends and colleagues were unaware that Joyce had been habitually consuming half a bottle of brandy every day for over 10 years.

In 2004, on an audio commentary on the Australian Umbrella DVD release of George and Mildred: the Complete Series 2, Brian Murphy revealed that there had been plans for a sixth series of eight episodes of the show. These were to have been recorded in late 1980. Murphy also revealed that this was due to have been the final series of George and Mildred, as he and Yootha Joyce were afraid of being typecast after playing the characters since 1973 on television and in two films. However, despite scripts being written, Joyce's hospitalisation and subsequent death brought a premature end to the show. Her funeral took place on the day the cast were due to begin rehearsals for the new series. Speaking of their relationship in a 2001 ITV programme, The Unforgettable Yootha Joyce, Murphy said, "Yootha I've always regarded as a very stylish lady, and very confident. I was rather over-awed by her at first, full of admiration for her." Following her death, "People said, 'You've lost a working partner' and I said, 'No, I've lost a chum'... and then I realised I've lost my working partnership as well...".

Thames Television did consider producing a spin-off for the character of George, looking at him cope with life as a widower. However, this project did not materialise, with Brian Murphy briefly moving to the BBC the following year for L for Lester which was cancelled after one series.

He did reunite with George and Mildred co-star Roy Kinnear and writers Johnnie Mortimer and Brian Cooke for The Incredible Mr Tanner, a comedy produced by Thames Television in 1981.

== Adaptations ==
George and Mildred was adapted in the United States as The Ropers, a spin-off from Three's Company (itself the US adaptation of Man About the House).

== International success ==
The series proved so popular in Spain that the Spanish paint company Titanlux hired the actors to play their characters for a television commercial advertising their paint.

== Home releases ==
=== UK ===
The first DVD of George and Mildred was released by Clear Vision in the UK in 2001, featuring six episodes of series one (four episodes of the first series were omitted). The DVD was criticised for poor image quality and changes to the original captions.

The George and Mildred movie was released on DVD in 2003.

Network DVD in Region 2 (UK) from 2005 to 2007 with superior image quality and unedited captions.

Region 2 "Network DVD" Releases:

- Series 1 – 2005
- Series 2 – 30 January 2006
- Series 3 – 20 March 2006
- Series 4 – 7 August 2006
- Series 5 – 22 January 2007
- The Complete Series (all 5 individual seasons in a box) – 24 September 2007
- The Complete Series (repackaged into slimmer packaging) – 26 May 2008

=== Australia ===
In Australia, the first series was released by Umbrella on 15 May 2003. Unlike the Clear Vision release of Series 1, all ten episodes were included, as were the original advertising captions, the Thames TV idents at the start and original end boards. A DVD of Series 2 was released on 19 March 2004. A DVD of the movie was released on 18 November 2004. Unlike the UK Network release of Series 2, the Australian version contained some audio commentaries with series star Brian Murphy. Series 3, 4 and 5 were released in Australia on DVD in 2008.

In 2009, FremantleMedia re-released DVDs of each of the five series with the same cover art as the UK releases with Season 1 released on 14 May 2009 and remainder seasons following. In 2011, Fremantle once again re-released all five series with new cover art with Series 1, 2 & 3 on 3 March 2011 and Series 4 & 5 on 1 September 2011, and a complete box set was released on 8 April 2015.

Via Vision Entertainment later released "The Complete Series" on 17 March 2021.

== See also ==
- List of films based on British sitcoms
