= George and Mildred (film) =

1980 British comedy by Peter Frazer Jones

- British quad poster by Tom Beauvais
- Directed by: Peter Frazer Jones
- Written by: Dick Sharples
- Based on: George and Mildred by Johnnie Mortimer and Brian Cooke
- Produced by: Roy Skeggs
- Starring: Yootha Joyce; Brian Murphy; Stratford Johns; Norman Eshley; Sheila Fearn; Kenneth Cope; David Barry
- Cinematography: Frank Watts
- Edited by: Peter Weatherley
- Music by: Les Reed
- Production companies: Chips Productions; Cinema Arts International Production
- Distributed by: ITC Film Distributors
- Release date: 27 July 1980
- Running time: 89 minutes
- Country: United Kingdom
- Language: English

George and Mildred is a 1980 British comedy film directed by Peter Frazer Jones and starring Yootha Joyce, Brian Murphy, Stratford Johns and Kenneth Cope. It was adapted by Dick Sharples from the television sitcom George and Mildred, with Joyce and Murphy reprising their roles as the two title characters.

== Plot ==
Mildred is keen to ascertain whether or not her husband George has remembered their 27th wedding anniversary. Needless to say, he has not. When he finally remembers, he books a table at the restaurant where he first proposed to Mildred. But to his horror, he discovers on arrival that it has been turned into a greasy spoon café run by Hells Angels style bikers. Mildred then decides that she and George will celebrate their 27th wedding anniversary in style at the plush, world famous London hotel – however unhappy George might be at the cost involved. But on arrival, George is mistaken for a ruthless hit-man by a shady businessman, who wants a rival eliminated.

== Release ==
Released on 27 July 1980, less than a month before the death (on 24 August 1980) of star Yootha Joyce, the film was neither a commercial nor a critical success. The film first aired on television on ITV on Christmas Day 1980, only five months after its theatrical release.

== Critical reception ==
The Monthly Film Bulletin wrote: "Spun-off from a TV series that was originally a spin-off from an earlier series, George and Mildred is flaccid entertainment even by routine sit-com standards, and amounts to no more than one attenuated music-hall joke: the boorish husband. Brian Murphy's snivelling, runtish Roper drives a beat-up Morris Minor, guzzles brown ale and sports woollen underwear; Yootha Joyce (an icily accomplished comedienne) matches the tone with a caricature that trades on loud costumes, cheap accessories and ambitions way beyond her means. Whatever sparks may once have fired this screen relationship have long since been snuffed by the overwhelming pettiness of the characters. They behave here exactly as they would in the half-hour TV sit-com, but by nature of the expanded format are forced into more socially embarrassing confrontations than the characterisations can cope with. Hence the hasty wrapping-up of the absurdly exotic gangster plot, and the cop-out solution of the closing car chase (in which Stratford Johns finally loses one of several hairpieces he has essayed in the course of the film)."

Marjorie Bilbow wrote in Screen International: "Bright and breezy larks that retain the saltily flavoured essence of the love-hate relationship between the constantly bickering George and Mildred in spite of taking them out of their suburban setting and involving them in a comedy crime adventure with bullets flying and bodies falling. The device of mixing domestic comedy and near-black farce works because all the baddies go slightly over the top to play for laughs while Yootha Joyce and Brian Murphy remain strictly within the characters they have moulded and developed over the years. As innocents abroad in a crime jungle, oblivious to the mayhem and chaos they have caused, they carry the bizarre plot with the ease of the real professionals they are. Peter Frazer-Jones keeps the pace going, but never lets the action destroy the humour of the dialogue."

Bright Lights Film Journal described the film as "one of the worst films ever made in Britain ...so strikingly bad, it seems to have been assembled with a genuine contempt for its audience."

Jon Bentham in The Guardian called the film "awful", adding that the film's failure marked "the death knell" for the 1970s British practice of producing motion picture spinoffs based on sitcoms.

Leslie Halliwell wrote: "Abysmal TV spinoff, seeming even more lugubrious since it was released after the death of its female star."

The Radio Times Guide to Films gave the film 1/5 stars, writing: "Brian Murphy and Yootha Joyce were consistently funny on TV as the Ropers, first in Man about the House and then in their own series George and Mildred. But this desperate, smutty comedy of errors is no laughing matter. Made a year after the series ended, it was a sad finale for Yootha Joyce, who died before the film was released."

== Cast ==
- Yootha Joyce as Mildred Roper
- Brian Murphy as George Roper
- Stratford Johns as Harry Pinto
- Norman Eshley as Jeffrey Fourmile
- Sheila Fearn as Ann Fourmile
- Kenneth Cope as Harvey
- David Barry as Elvis
- Sue Bond as Marlene
- Nicholas Bond-Owen as Tristram Fourmile
- Neil McCarthy as Eddie
- Dudley Sutton as Jacko
- Garfield Morgan as Big Jim Bridges
- Harry Fowler as Fisher
- Bruce Montague as Spanish businessman
- Michael Angelis as café proprietor
- Hugh Walters as waiter
- Johnnie Wade as porter
- John Carlin as casino supervisor
- Suzanne Owens as croupier
- Bridget Brice as receptionist
- Robin Parkinson as receptionist
- Roger Avon as commissionaire
- Dennis Ramsden as bishop
