= Norman Eshley =

British actor (1945–2025)

- Born: 30 May 1945; Bristol, England
- Died: 2 August 2025 (aged 80); Gloucester, England
- Education: Bristol Old Vic Theatre School
- Occupations: Actor, writer
- Years active: c. early 1960s–2021
- Spouses: Millicent Martin (m. 1969; div. 1973) Lynette Braid (m. 1980; div. 1981) Rachel Spiers (m. 2015)

Norman Eshley (30 May 1945 – 2 August 2025) was an English character actor and writer. He began his career on stage but was best known for his television roles, notably as Jeffrey Fourmile in the sitcom George and Mildred.

== Early life ==
Eshley was born in Bristol, England, on 30 May 1945. He attended Bristol Grammar School and then worked in a bank, before deciding to become an actor and training at the Bristol Old Vic Theatre School.

== Career ==
Eshley started his career on stage and played in many Shakespearean roles before establishing himself as a theatre performer on the West End theatre circuit.

Eshley's first screen role was in the 1968 film The Immortal Story, directed by Orson Welles. He played a lead character, Steve Reding, in Blind Terror (1971) and appeared in the Pete Walker horror film House of Mortal Sin in 1975.

In 1969, Eshley appeared alongside Dudley Sutton in two very similar villainous roles: in the Randall & Hopkirk (Deceased) episode "Could You Recognise the Man Again?", and in the Department S episode "Handicap Dead". However, he is possibly best known for his role in the sitcom George and Mildred (1976–79) as the snobbish, right-wing estate agent Jeffrey Fourmile, the foil to George. He had previously featured in several episodes of the show's direct predecessor, Man About the House (1973–76), as Robin Tripp's brother Norman, who marries Chrissy (Paula Wilcox). In an earlier Man About the House episode, "In Praise of Older Men" (1974), Eshley played a sleazy married executive named Ian Cross who tried to seduce Chrissy.

In 1985, Eshley played the Reverend Redwood, a benevolent vicar who runs a social club with a view to rehabilitating ex-convicts in the Minder episode "Give Us This Day Arthur Daley's Bread".

Eshley's other TV credits include: Thriller ("The Colour of Blood"/US title: "The Carnation Killer", 1973) as an escaped serial killer, Warship (1973–74), The Duchess of Duke Street, I, Claudius, The Sweeney (all 1976), Return of the Saint (1978), a former SAS colleague of Bodie in The Professionals' episode "Kickback" (1980), a vicar in Minder (1985), Taggart (1990), Cadfael (1994), One Foot in the Grave (1997), Dangerfield (1998), and The Bill (1999–2000).

In 1988 he appeared in a public information film about road safety called Accident in Park Road. His character is seen driving a Ford Escort, before running over a child who dashes out between cars in front of him. He is questioned by Graham Cole who plays a policeman, a role Cole played as PC Tony Stamp in The Bill.

Along with Douglas Fielding, Eshley provided the narration for the Blind Guardian albums Nightfall in Middle-Earth and Legacy of the Dark Lands. He had roles in the BBC TV series New Tricks (2007) and A Christmas Campaign (short, 2011). In 2019, he appeared in the documentary The Immortal Orson Welles, directed by Chris Wade.

Eshley's final credit is a posthumous performance as Lord Lestrade in the audio drama Sir Sherlock: The Red Letter Day.

== Personal life and death ==
Eshley was married three times. In 1969, he married actress Millicent Martin in Brighton. The couple divorced in 1973. Eshley later married Lynette Braid in the 1980s; this marriage too ended in divorce.

In 1993, Eshley was a passenger in a car involved in a crash in the Dordogne, France. He sustained a punctured lung, a cracked sternum, a broken shoulder blade, a fractured arm, and head and neck injuries when cut from the wreckage.

In 2015, Eshley married Rachel Spiers, they lived in Tewkesbury, Gloucestershire, until his death from cancer at the Gloucestershire Royal Hospital on 2 August 2025, aged 80.

== Filmography ==
=== Film ===
Year	Title	Role	Notes
1968	The Immortal Story	Paul, the sailor	
1968	The Lost Continent	Jonathan	
1969	Crossplot	Athol	
1971	See No Evil	Steve Reding	
1976	House of Mortal Sin	Father Bernard Cutler	
1977	The Disappearance	Young Husband	
1980	George and Mildred	Jeffrey Fourmile	
2000	Empty Mirror	Oz Riley	
2011	A Christmas Campaign	Creative Director	Short film

=== Television ===
Year	Title	Role	Notes
1968	A Most Unfortunate Accident	Roger	
1968	A Man of Our Times	Simon	Episode: "Sally Go Round the Moon"
1968	Mystery and Imagination	Jean Lemaistre	Episode: "The Telltale Heart"
1968	City '68	Jeremy	Episode: "The System: The Fleapit"
1968–1972	ITV Playhouse	Roger/Jude	2 episodes
1969	Department S	Red	Episode: "Handicap Dead"
1969	Thirty-Minute Theatre	Rab	Episode: "Trespassers"
1969	Canterbury Tales	Lover	Episode: "The Merchant's Tale/The Manciple's Tale"
1970	Randall and Hopkirk (Deceased)	Mike Hales	Episode: "Could You Recognise the Man Again?"
1970	Parkin's Patch	Vickory	Episode: "Vickory"
1972	The Regiment	Simon Howarth	Episode: "Christmas at the Cape"
1972	Play for Today	Dave Osmond	Episode: "The Bouncing Boy"
1973	Justice	Nick Adams	Episode: "Malicious Damage"
1973	Thriller	Arthur Page	Episode: "The Carnation Killer"
1973	Between the Wars	Vincent	Episode: "Voyage in the Dark"
1973	Vienna 1900	Alfred Beratoner	2 episodes
1973	Warship	Lieutenant Bob Last	Series 1-2
1974–1976	Man About the House	Ian Cross/ Norman Tripp	4 episodes
1974	The Onedin Line	Hon. Hugh Kernan	Episode: "Port Out, Starboard Home"
1974	Zodiac	Paul Deening	Episode: "The Strength of Gemini"
1974	BBC Play of the Month	Charles Hornblower	Episode: "The Skin Game"
1974	And Mother Makes Five	Mr. Witherspoon	Episode: "To the Aid of the Party"
1975	Whodunnit?	Roy Sharp	Episode: "Beware, Wet Paint"
1976	Orde Wingate	Cpl. Thomas	Episode: "If I Forget Thee of Jerusalem"
1976–1979	George and Mildred	Jeffrey Fourmile	
1976	The Sweeney	Det. Sgt. Robert Hargreaves	Episode: "Taste of Fear"
1976	The Duchess of Duke Street	Wilson	Episode: "A Matter of Honour"
1976	I, Claudius	Marcus Vinicius	2 episodes
1976	Centre Play	William Wilson	Episode: "William Wilson"
1977	Supernatural	Edward	Episode: "Viktoria"
1977	Yanks Go Home	Lt. Beamish Cooke-Cooke	Episode: "Cooke-Cooke"
1977	Secret Army	Sgt. Clifford Howson	Episode: "Growing Up"
1978	1990	Tony Borden	Episode: "Trapline"
1978	Out	Turpitt	Episode: "A Little Heart to Heart With Miss Bangor"
1978	Return of the Saint	Detective George Caufield	2 episodes
1979	Crown Court	Peter Fisher	Serial: "Rebel at Law"
1980	The Professionals	Jimmy Keller	Episode: "Kickback"
1983	Maybury	Larry Chalmers	2 episodes
1983	The Outsider	Donald Harper	Miniseries
1985	Hilary	Dr. Fenwick	1 episode
1985	Minder	Reverend Redwood	Episode: "Give Us This Day Arthur Daley's Bread"
1985	The Black Tower	Victor Holroyd	Pilot
1985–1986	Brookside	Alun Jones	11 episodes
1986	Executive Stress	Gascoigne	1 episode
1987	Late Expectations	Harry	
1989	William Tell	Woodsman	Episode: "Goldilocks"
1989	After Henry	Philip	Episode: "Upstagers"
1990	Taggart	Commander Gunner	Episode: "Death Comes Softly"
1991	The Ruth Rendell Mysteries	Jon Walsh	Episode: "Achilles Heel"
1994	Cadfael	Baron Huon de Domville	Episode: "The Leper of St. Giles"
1994	All Night Long	Roy Morris	1 episode
1997	The New Adventures of Robin Hood	Baron Royston	Episode: "The Road to Royston"
1997	Thief Takers	CI Samson	Episode: "Road Rage"
1997	One Foot in the Grave	Detective Inspector Rickles	Episode: "Endgame"
1998	The Broker's Man	Leigh Dunwell	Episode: "Playback"
1998	Get Real	Martin	Episode: "Hero"
1998	Dangerfield	Superintendent Studley	Episode: "Double Helix"
1999–2000	The Bill	Terry Riley/Mr. Gibbs	4 episodes
1999	Murder Most Horrid	DCI Reed	Episode: "Whoopi Stone"
1999	Harbour Lights	Mayor	Episode: "The Last Supper"
1999	Goodnight Sweetheart	Priestley	Episode: "Something Fishie"
2007	New Tricks	Billy Pierce	Episode: "God's Waiting Room"
2017	The White Princess	The Abbot	Episode: "English Blood on English Soil"
