= Craze (film) =

1974 British film by Freddie Francis

- Directed by: Freddie Francis
- Written by: Herman Cohen; Aben Kandel
- Based on: novel The Infernal Idol by Henry Seymour
- Produced by: Herman Cohen
- Starring: Jack Palance; Diana Dors; Julie Ege; Edith Evans; Hugh Griffith; Trevor Howard; Michael Jayston; Suzy Kendall; Martin Potter
- Cinematography: John Wilcox
- Edited by: Henry Richardson
- Music by: John Scott
- Production company: Harbour Productions
- Distributed by: EMI Film Distributors Ltd. (United Kingdom and Ireland); Warner Bros. (United States and Canada)
- Release dates: May 16, 1974 (United Kingdom); June 5, 1974 (United States)
- Running time: 96 minutes
- Countries: United Kingdom; United States
- Language: English

Craze is a 1974 horror film directed by Freddie Francis and starring Jack Palance, Diana Dors, Julie Ege and Edith Evans. It was written by Herman Cohen and Aben Kandel, based on the 1967 novel The Infernal Idol by Henry Seymour. The film centers on Neal Mottram, a psychotic antiques dealer who sacrifices women to the statue of Chuku, an African idol. It was the last film produced by Herman Cohen.

== Cast ==
- Jack Palance as Neal Mottram
- Diana Dors as Dolly Newman
- Julie Ege as Helena
- Edith Evans as Aunt Louise
- Hugh Griffith as Solicitor
- Trevor Howard as Bellamy
- Suzy Kendall as Sally
- Michael Jayston as Wall
- Martin Potter as Ronnie
- Percy Herbert as Detective Russet
- David Warbeck as Detective Wilson
- Kathleen Byron as Muriel Sharp

== Production ==
The film was based on the 1967 novel The Infernal Idol by Henry Seymour. In 1972, it was reported Herman Cohen had the rights and a script was being written. In March 1972, it was announced Jack Palance would star in a film version, which would be a co production between Herman Cohen and Joe Solomon.

Freddie Francis had made a number of horror movies for Amicus and other producers, including Herman Cohen for whom he directed Trog (1970). Francis wrote in his memoir: "No sooner had I started it than I realised I was flogging a dead horse." He stated that there were "only four good things about" the movie – Palance, Trevor Howard, Edith Evans and Hugh Griffith – adding "Jack lost interest in it almost straight away, Hugh and Trevor were both heavily on the bottle and dear Edith thought we were making a 'proper' film and therefore had all the time in the world." Francis says because the cast included Howard and Griffith, Evans thought there was plenty of time to block scenes, when Francis only had a six-week schedule.

Palance arrived in London to make the film which began filming in March 1973. Cohen says he got along with Palance but "everyone else was afraid of Jack – he has that aura about him. Freddie Francis was scared stiff of him."

Francis later said, "Even Jack couldn't help that one. I thought we could've made something of it with Jack, but once again Herman had this old Aben Kandel writing the scripts and I think Abe would do anything Herman told him." Francis also said the film was "not that good."

== Reception ==
The Monthly Film Bulletin wrote: "Tepid, predictable British thriller in which Jack Palance and a team of comic policemen play cat and mouse with each other through an assortment of studio sets which belong to another era of film-making. ... The performances, however, are uniformly good; although, ironically, it is the large cast of distinguished supporting players who manage their aggressively American dialogue with aplomb, and Palance – struggling to make more of his lines than they will permit – who is at sea."

Variety wrote: "Craze is a silly, lightweight horror film that may lure more than its fair share of customers by dint of an unusually strong cast for such piffle. ...Herman Cohen production's only distinction lies in providing Edith Evans. Hugh Griffith, Trevor Howard, Michael Jayston and several other worthy performers with their most inconsequential screen roles to date."

The Radio Times Guide to Films gave the film 1/5 stars, writing: "Jack Palance gives his eye-rolling all as a mad antique collector who plans to increase his wealth by sacrificing London dolly birds to his favourite African idol. Trashy, endless rubbish from producer Herman Cohen, with an amazingly eclectic cast, this infernal nonsense even defeats veteran horror director Freddie Francis."

Leslie Halliwell said: "Crude shocker from the bottom of even this producer's barrel, notable for the star cast which was surprisingly roped in."

Cohen says the film "did very well" financially but was hurt because the producer had sold the film to National General in the US, who were bought about by Warner Brothers; this caused a delay in the film's release in the US.

== Notes ==
- Weaver, Tom (2003). Double Feature Creature Attack: A Monster Merger of Two More Volumes of Classic Interviews. McFarland. ISBN 9780786482153.
