= Herman Cohen =

American film producer and screenwriter (1925–2002)

- Born: August 27, 1925; Detroit, Michigan, U.S.
- Died: June 2, 2002 (aged 76); Los Angeles, California, U.S.
- Other names: Kenneth Langtry; Ralph Thornton
- Occupations: Film producer, screenwriter

Herman Cohen (August 27, 1925 – June 2, 2002) was an American film producer and screenwriter, known for his various B-movies. He is credited with helping to popularize the teen horror movie genre with films like the cult classic I Was a Teenage Werewolf.

== Early life ==
Born and raised in Detroit, Michigan, Cohen began his career in show business as a gofer and later an usher at the Dexter Theater in Detroit, starting he was just 12. By 18, he was managing the Dexter. From there he went on to become assistant manager of the Fox Theatre (also in Detroit) — a theater featuring over 5,000 seats. He would later buy the theatre in 1961.

== Career ==
=== B-movie producer ===
After a tour of duty with the Marines, Cohen became sales manager for Columbia Pictures in the Detroit Area and moved to Hollywood to work for the publicity department of Columbia in the 1940s. In the 1950s he started producing films, first working as assistant (and later associate) producer for Jack Broder and Realart Pictures on such films as Bride of the Gorilla, Battles of Chief Pontiac (featuring Lon Chaney Jr.), Bela Lugosi Meets a Brooklyn Gorilla and Kid Monk Baroni (featuring a 21-year-old Leonard Nimoy as a street kid turned boxer). He later worked for Allied Artists and United Artists producing such films as Target Earth, Magnificent Roughnecks (with Mickey Rooney), and Crime of Passion (with Barbara Stanwyck and Raymond Burr). Cohen also wrote the stories and/or screenplays for at least nine films, co-writing with friend Aben Kandel and sometimes using one pseudonym between them – either "Ralph Thornton" or "Kenneth Langtry" (Kandel also wrote solo for Cohen on Kid Monk Baroni and, using the Thornton moniker, on Blood of Dracula).

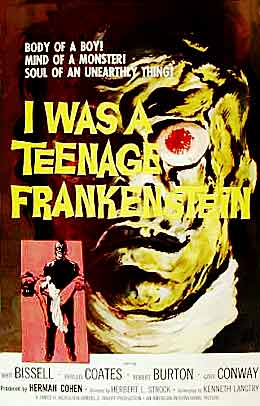
The Cohen-produced horror film I Was a Teenage Frankenstein

Cohen had greater success in the mid-50s though, with a horror film for American International Pictures (AIP) — I Was a Teenage Werewolf, which he both wrote and produced. The film cost about $100,000 to make, but earned more than $2 million. He also discovered young Michael Landon, cast in the lead role for I Was a Teenage Werewolf. Cohen followed this success by writing and producing more teen horror films, such as I Was a Teenage Frankenstein, How to Make a Monster, and Blood of Dracula. In a 1991 interview with Tom Weaver, Cohen reflected, "I have always felt that most teenagers think that adults – their parents, or their teacher, anyone who was older and who had authority – were culprits in their lives."

During the early years of AIP (then still-called American Releasing Corporation), Cohen was offered a partner's stake by founder James H. Nicholson, but he declined due to his commitments to United Artists. Nicholson instead offered it to Samuel Z. Arkoff.

Cohen also occasionally appeared in his own films, usually as an uncredited extra. He played the director in the projection room in How to Make a Monster, and can also be seen in I Was a Teenage Werewolf, Konga, Black Zoo, Crooks and Coronets, and Trog.

=== British films and distributor ===
Starting in 1959, he began producing horror films in the United Kingdom, working with such stars as Joan Crawford in Berserk! and Trog, and Jack Palance in Craze.

By the late 1970s, Cohen was working more in writing and distribution than in production. He founded Cobra Media, a domestic distribution company, in 1981.

== Death ==
Cohen died of throat cancer at Cedars-Sinai Medical Center on June 2, 2002, at age 76.

== Filmography ==
Year	Title	Functioned as		Director	Notes
Year	Title	Producer	Writer	Director	Notes
1952	The Bushwackers	Associate	No	Rod Amateau	
1952	Kid Monk Baroni	Associate	No	Harold Schuster	
1952	Bela Lugosi Meets a Brooklyn Gorilla	Associate	No	William Beaudine	
1952	Battles of Chief Pontiac	Associate	No	Felix E. Feist	
1953	Operation Malaya	Executive	No	David MacDonald	Documentary
1954	River Beat	Executive	No	Guy Green	
1954	Target Earth	Yes	No	Sherman A. Rose	
1956	Magnificent Roughnecks	Yes	No	Sherman A. Rose	
1956	The Brass Legend	Yes	No	Gerd Oswald	
1956	Dance with Me, Henry	Yes	No	Charles Barton	
1957	Crime of Passion	Yes	No	Gerd Oswald	
1957	I Was a Teenage Werewolf	Yes	Yes	Gene Fowler Jr.	
1957	I Was a Teenage Frankenstein	Yes	Yes	Herbert L. Strock	
1957	Blood of Dracula	Yes	No	Herbert L. Strock	
1958	How to Make a Monster	Yes	Yes	Herbert L. Strock	
1959	Horrors of the Black Museum	Executive	Yes	Arthur Crabtree	
1959	The Headless Ghost	Executive	Yes	Peter Graham Scott	
1961	Konga	Yes	Yes	John Lemont	
1963	Black Zoo	Yes	Yes	Robert Gordon	
1965	A Study in Terror	Executive	No	James Hill	
1967	Berserk!	Yes	Yes	Jim O'Connolly	
1969	Crooks and Coronets	Yes	No	Jim O'Connolly	
1969	Django the Bastard	Yes	No	Sergio Garrone	Credited on U.S. version only
1970	Trog	Yes	No	Freddie Francis	
1974	Craze	Yes	Yes	Freddie Francis	
1977	Watch Me When I Kill	Yes	No	Antonio Bido	Credited on U.S. version only
