= Black Zoo =

1963 film by Robert Gordon

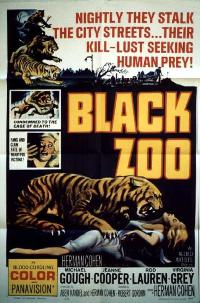
- Film poster by Reynold Brown
- Directed by: Robert Gordon
- Written by: Aben Kandel; Herman Cohen
- Produced by: Herman Cohen
- Starring: Michael Gough; Jeanne Cooper; Rod Lauren; Virginia Grey
- Cinematography: Floyd Crosby
- Edited by: Michael Luciano
- Music by: Paul Dunlap
- Distributed by: Allied Artists Pictures Corporation
- Release date: May 15, 1963 (U.S. premiere)
- Running time: 88 min.
- Country: United States
- Language: English
- Budget: $1,000,000

Black Zoo (also known as Horrors of the Black Zoo) is a 1963 American horror film directed by Robert Gordon and starring Michael Gough, Jeanne Cooper, Rod Lauren, Virginia Grey, Jerome Cowan, and Elisha Cook, Jr. It was produced by Herman Cohen and written by Cohen and Aben Kandel.

== Cast and characters ==
- Michael Gough as Michael Conrad: The film’s antagonist, An owner of Conrad’s Animal Kingdom, a private suburban zoo in Los Angeles. Tall, cadaverous, and intensely charismatic, he leads the secret cult “The True Believers,” who worship animals as superior beings with migrating souls. He trains his “children” (tiger, lion, lioness, a black panther, cougar, gorilla Victor, etc.) to obey lethal commands and uses them to murder anyone who threatens his land, his zoo, or his twisted ideology. Abusive and domineering toward his wife Edna and mute son Carl, he plays organ music for the animals in his parlor as if they were family. He orchestrates the deaths of Mary Hogan (tiger), Jerry Stengel (lion), Joe (lion), Jenny Brooks (gorilla), and attempts to kill Edna. In the climax, he reveals Carl is his biological son and dies strangled by Carl in the rain while calling desperately for his animals to save him. His death leaves the caged cats forlorn and powerless.
- Jeanne Cooper as Edna Conrad: Michael Conrad’s long-suffering, mistreated wife and chimpanzee performer at the zoo. A former circus star, she brings a touch of humanity and quiet resistance to the oppressive environment. She helps Carl overcome his fear of Michael and tries to give him a more normal life. She urges Carl to eat with the family and later convinces him to flee with her after suspecting Michael of the murders. When Michael drags her through the mud by her hair during their escape attempt in the rain, she screams for Carl’s help. Her relationship with Michael is toxic; he taunts her and treats both her and Carl like animals he controls. She survives the climax thanks to Carl’s intervention.
- Rod Lauren as Carl: Michael Conrad’s adoptive/biological muted son and reluctant assistant at the zoo. Traumatized since childhood, he was struck mute after witnessing his biological mother being torn apart by a lioness on Michael’s command. Forced to help manage the animals and carry out his father’s orders, he lives in fear and isolation. Briefly connects with art student Audrey, who flirts with him. He drives the car for Michael during the Jenny Brooks murder. When Edna convinces him to flee, Michael’s revelation that “Carl is my son” triggers suppressed memories. In the rainy climax, Carl fights and strangles his father to save Edna, finally rebelling against years of abuse.
  - Daniel Kurlick as Young Carl
- Virginia Grey as Jenny Brooks: A theatrical talent agent and Edna's best closed friend who used to work with his apes in a circus. After confessing to distancing himself from Michael, and return to a neighborhood in Hollywood, Michael uses his gorilla Victor to kill her in her own garage. she falls against her car's steering wheel, causing the horn to blare and alerting neighbors.
- Jerome Cowan as Jerry Stengel: A property businessman and speculator interested in buying the land of Conrad’s Animal Kingdom for tract development. He pressures Michael to sell, becoming a direct threat to the zoo and cult. Invited to his house in Encino, Stengel is murdered when Conrad commands his lion “King” to attack while he mixes a cocktail. His death is one of the early animal killings that baffles the police.
- Elisha Cook Jr. as Joe: A cowardly zoo employee who harasses the animals. After being bitten by Conrad's favorite tiger "Baron" and for having killed him He is thrown into the cage of one of his lions by Carl, After putting him in Michael's cemetery
- Edward Platt as Chief of Detectives Rivers: An associate police chief trying to investigate animal attack crimes in the city, He is repeatedly bewildered by how large wild animals are killing people across Los Angeles without being seen or captured. He coordinates from the office, orders the dragnet on private zoo owners, and works with Lieutenant Duggan, the Coroner, and Perkins. Represents the rational, procedural side of law enforcement struggling against seemingly impossible crimes.
- Douglas Henderson as Lt. Mel Duggan: A police investigator and primary assistant to Chief Rivers. Who is in charge of investigating the deaths of people killed by animals.
- Byron Morrow as the Coroner: A police doctor in charge of analyzing the fundamental deaths of people injured by animals.
- Jerry Douglas as Perkins: a police lab technician He is in charge of investigating cases of crimes committed by animals, especially in the collection of hair from an ape.
- Marianna Hill as Audrey: A young art student who kills her crush on Carl
- Oren Curtis as Radu: An African american servant and member of the cult The True Believers who serves as high priest at Baron's funeral
- Joseph Mell as Frank Cramer: A Hollywood citizen in a red bathrobe investigates Jenny's body because of the sound of the horn and calls the police.
- Eric Stone and Eilene Janssen as Groom and Bride: One of the tourists visiting the zoo at the beginning, They are guided through the zoo and even discuss plans like moving to Catalina Island in her honeymoon.
- Warrene Ott as Mary Hogan: A distracted secretary from Westwood, The person who appears at the beginning walking in the streets, was killed by Baron, Michael's tiger, making him one of their victims.
- Claudia Brack as Carl's Mother: Carl's real mother, who was killed by Michael using a lioness in a flashback sequence, provoking Carl to be mute.
- Michael St. Angel as Officer Donovan: A police officer visits Michael at the zoo, investigating Stengel's death.

== Production ==
Herman Cohen had the idea for the film, and hired Aben Kandel to work with him on the script. Finance came from Allied Artists.

Cohen had worked with Gough previously in Horrors of the Black Museum and Konga. He was brought into the US for the role. Gough later said this film was the favorite of the ones the actor made for Cohen because of the involvement of the animals.

The film was shot at Raleigh Studios. The animals were provided by Ralph Helfer, most notably Zamba, who played one of the two male lions (Zamba Jr. and Tammy also appeared playing another lion and a lioness, respectively). The zoo was built at Raleigh Studio (formerly Producers Studio) on North Bronson in Hollywood, California. The entire zoo seen in the picture was an interior set.

Publicity was done with the cats – including an appearance on The Tonight Show Starring Johnny Carson. Cohen did not like the title, preferring Horrors of the Black Zoo.

== Reception ==
The Monthly Film Bulletin wrote: "As a macabre essay, this has some unusual moments, notably the scenes showing the wild menagerie draped around the living-room furniture; but as a whole it suffers from an extravagant and rather silly script, and from Michael Gough's (perhaps inevitable) overplaying in the central role. Jeanne Cooper is rather fetching as his wife."

The film grossed $260,000 in its first seven days in New York.

Cohen intended to follow it with The Haunted Jungle.

== Home media ==
Black Zoo was released on a VHS by The Fang (Floral Park, NY) in 2001 (OCLC 48234539)
