= I Was a Teenage Frankenstein =

1957 film by Herbert L. Strock

I was a Teenage Frankenstein
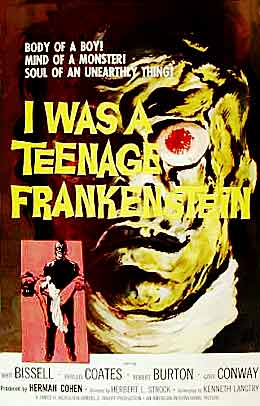
- Theatrical release poster by Reynold Brown
- Directed by: Herbert L. Strock
- Written by: Aben Kandel (credited as Kenneth Langtry)
- Produced by: Herman Cohen executive Samuel Z. Arkoff; James H. Nicholson
- Starring: Whit Bissell; Phyllis Coates; Robert Burton; Gary Conway; George Lynn
- Production company: Santa Rosa Productions
- Distributed by: American International Pictures
- Release date: November 27, 1957
- Running time: 74 minutes (US); 68 minutes (UK)
- Country: United States
- Language: English
- Box office: $310,000

I Was a Teenage Frankenstein (U.K. title: Teenage Frankenstein) is a 1957 horror film starring Whit Bissell, Phyllis Coates and Gary Conway. It was previewed by American International Pictures (AIP) in November 1957 as a double feature with Blood of Dracula (1957). It was the follow-up to AIP's box office hit I Was a Teenage Werewolf, released less than five months earlier. Both films later received a sequel in the crossover How to Make a Monster, released in July 1958. The film stars Whit Bissell, Phyllis Coates, Robert Burton, Gary Conway and George Lynn. Philip Scheer did the Makeup, Jerry Young was the Editor, Lothrop Worth was cinematographer, Paul Dunlap did the music and Leslie Thomas was Art Director.

== Plot ==
Professor Frankenstein, a guest lecturer from England, talks Dr. Karlton into becoming an unwilling accomplice in his secret plan to actually assemble a human being from the parts of different cadavers. After recovering a body from a catastrophic automobile wreck, Professor Frankenstein takes the body to his laboratory/morgue, where he keeps spare parts of human beings in various drawers. The professor also enlists the aid of Margaret, as his secretary, to keep all callers away from the laboratory.

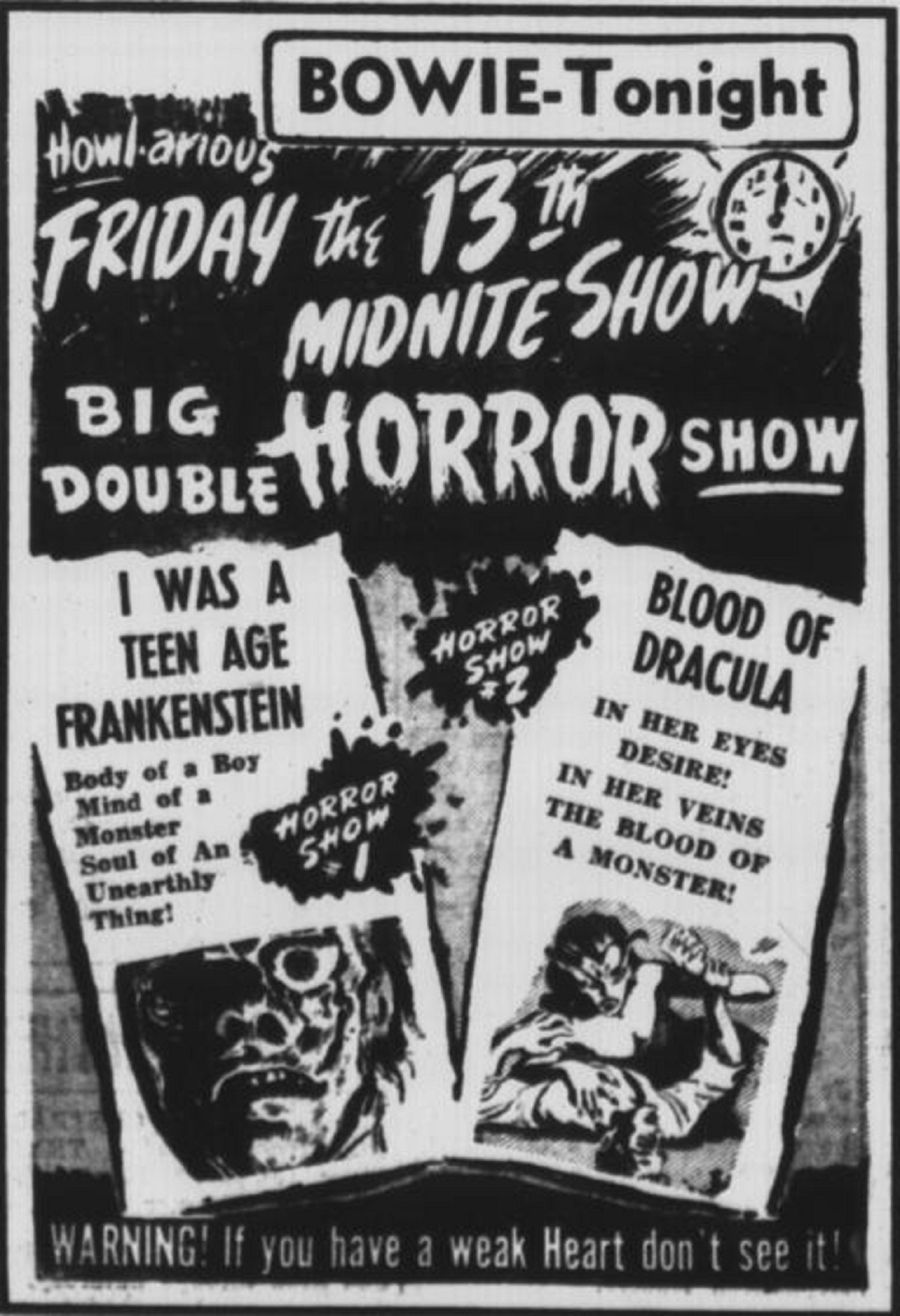
Advertisement from 1957 for I Was a Teenage Frankenstein and co-feature, Blood of Dracula.

Margaret, becoming suspicious of what is going on, decides to investigate and goes down to the morgue. She is panic-stricken by the monster, who has been activated following the grafting of a new leg and arm. She dares not tell the professor about her discovery and keeps silent for the present.

One night, the monster leaves the laboratory. He peers into a girl's apartment. The girl becomes hysterical and starts screaming; in his attempt to silence her, he kills her in panic and flees. The next morning, the hunt for the murderer is on. Margaret, angry at the professor, tells him that she knows that the monster is responsible for the murder. The professor, taking no chances, has the monster kill her and feeds her remains to his pet alligator. Dr. Karlton, sent out of town, knows nothing about this.

The professor accompanies the monster to a lover's lane, where he kills a teenage boy in order to obtain his face. The boy's face is successfully grafted onto the monster. Professor Frankenstein tells Dr. Karlton of his plans to dismember his creation and ship him in various boxes to England and then return there to put him together again. When they strap the monster down again, he becomes suspicious and tears loose. He throws Professor Frankenstein into the alligator pit while Dr. Karlton runs for help.

When Dr. Karlton arrives with the police, the monster, maddened with fright, backs into the electrical dial board. Contact with his iron wrist bands electrocutes him and he falls to the ground, dead. Karlton tells the police that he will never forget the way the monster's face looked after the accident.

== Cast ==
- Whit Bissell as Professor Frankenstein
- Phyllis Coates as Margaret
- Robert Burton as Dr. Karlton
- Gary Conway as the teenage Frankenstein monster/Bob
- George Lynn as Sergeant Burns
- John Cliff as Sergeant McAfee
- Marshall Bradford as Dr. Randolph
- Claudia Bryar as Arlene's mother
- Angela Blake as beautiful girl
- Russ Whiteman as Dr. Elwood

== Production ==
I Was a Teenage Werewolf had been a big success for AIP and a Texas exhibitor requested two new horror movies from the studio if they could be ready by Thanksgiving. American International Pictures commissioned Herman Cohen to make I Was a Teenage Frankenstein and Blood of Dracula. Cohen says the two films were written and put in front of the cameras in only four weeks "so I had to really, really cut down" in terms of production values.

I Was a Teenage Frankenstein was filmed in black-and-white, with the ending in color for a vivid effect. The film was shot at Ziv Studios. Cohen says that the alligator they hired for the movie had been used to dispose of the bodies of the victims of serial killer Joe Ball from a small town outside San Antonio.

== Reception ==
Upon its release, film critic Richard W. Nason, in his review for The New York Times, said,

If you discount any immediate connection between the mass media and the temper of the culture, then the film warrants little attention...The automaton, enacted by Gary Conway, is a teenager assemble[d] from the limbs of other teenagers. This is, in one sense, abhorrent. It forces one to acknowledge the impression that such films may aggravate the mass social sickness euphemistically termed 'juvenile delinquency'...In this particular film, there are graphic displays of human dismemberment. Before one such act of surgical perversion, the mad doctor'[s] assistant says 'I have no stomach for it.' That would be a plausible reaction for any adult who had read the day's headlines about teenage crime.

In 2009, film historian and critic Leonard Maltin dismissed I Was a Teenage Frankenstein as "campy junk...Doesn't live up to that title, worth catching only for Bissell's immortal line, 'Answer me! You have a civil tongue in your head! I know – I sewed it in there!'".

In 2018, critic and filmmaker Christopher Stewardson wrote "Flatly directed, statically shot, but with enough pseudo-scientific positing to enjoy, I Was a Teenage Frankenstein is strangely enjoyable".

I Was a Teenage Frankenstein was released on VHS videocassette in 1991 by RCA/Columbia Pictures Home Video under the shortened title Teenage Frankenstein, which was the original theatrical title that was used when the film was released in the U.K. by Anglo-Amalgamated.

== Copyright ==
As of 2015, all rights to the motion picture I Was a Teenage Frankenstein and its derivatives were the property of Susan Hart, the widow of producer James H. Nicholson.

== See also ==
- List of American films of 1957
- List of films featuring Frankenstein's monster
- Frankenstein; or, The Modern Prometheus, 1818 novel by Mary Shelley
