= Blood of Dracula =

- Theatrical release poster by Reynold Brown
- Directed by: Herbert L. Strock
- Screenplay by: Herman Cohen; Aben Kandel
- Story by: Aben Kandel
- Produced by: Herman Cohen
- Starring: Sandra Harrison; Louise Lewis; Gail Ganley; Jerry Blaine; Richard Devon; Thomas Browne Henry; Heather Ames
- Cinematography: Monroe Askins
- Edited by: Robert Moore
- Music by: Paul Dunlap
- Production company: Carmel Productions
- Distributed by: American International Pictures
- Release date: November 27, 1957
- Running time: 69 minutes
- Country: United States
- Language: English

Blood of Dracula (also known as Blood Is My Heritage in the United Kingdom) is a 1957 American black-and-white horror film directed by Herbert L. Strock, and starring Sandra Harrison, Louise Lewis and Gail Ganley. It was co-written by Aben Kandel and Herman Cohen (collectively credited as "Ralph Thornton").

Theatrically released by American International Pictures (AIP) in November 1957, it is one of two follow-ups to AIP's box office hit I Was a Teenage Werewolf. The film was released as a double feature alongside I Was a Teenage Frankenstein.

== Plot ==
Six weeks after the death of her mother, Nancy Perkins' father marries Doris and decides to enroll Nancy into a boarding school, the Sherwood School for Girls. They are greeted by the principal, Mrs. Thorndyke, who emphasizes to Nancy that the school is not a corrective institution but a private preparatory school with an outstanding reputation.

Nancy is harassed by her dormmates that night. After Thorndyke officially introduces Nancy to the girls at breakfast the next morning, Myra, their leader, tells Nancy that it was good that she did not mention anything about how they acted the previous night.

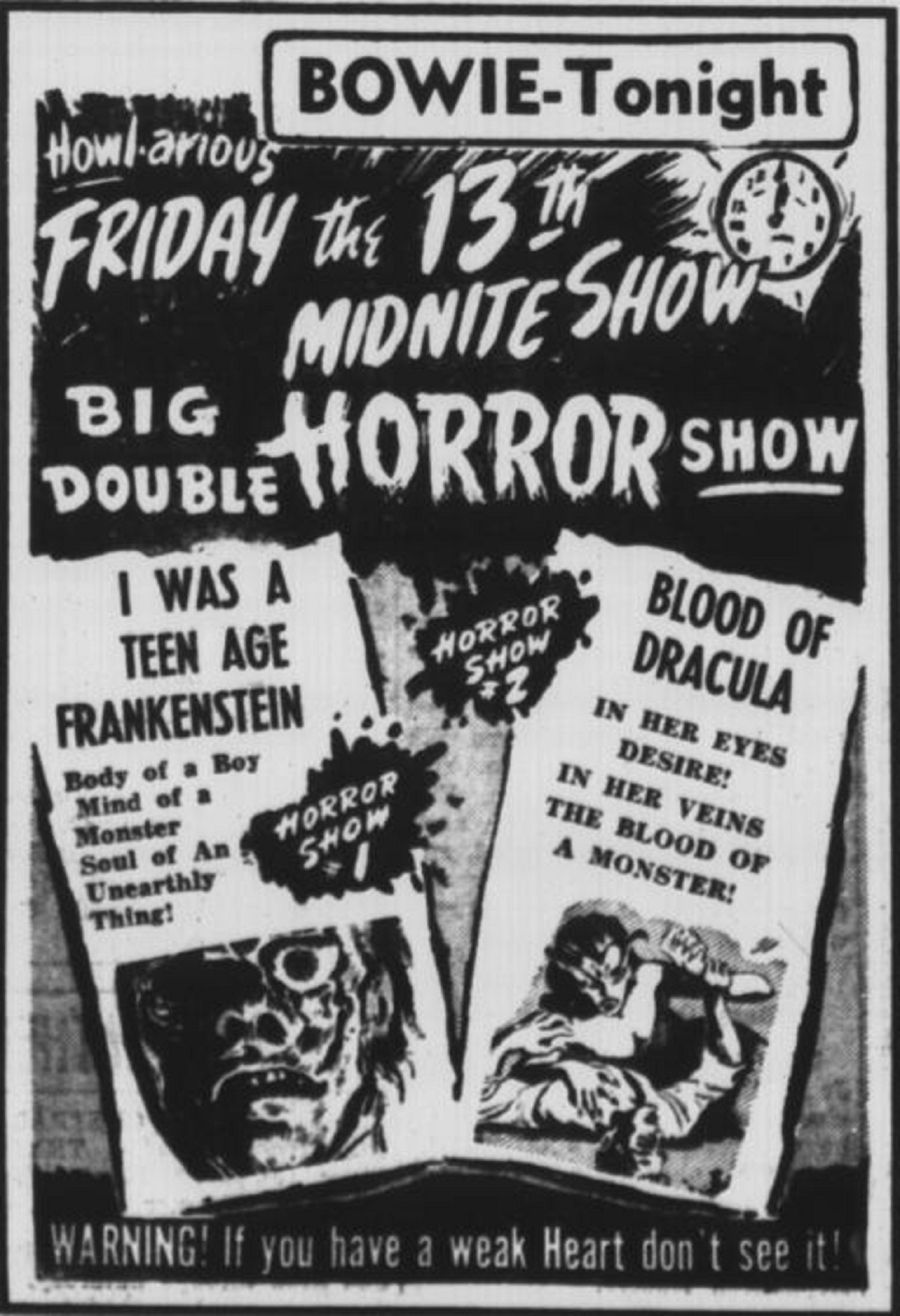
Advertisement from 1957 for Blood of Dracula and co-feature, I Was a Teenage Frankenstein.

Myra also tells Nancy about their secret club, "The Birds of Paradise", and introduces her to Eddie, a young groundsman whom the "Birds" take turns dating. Myra is the assistant for Miss Branding, the school's chemistry teacher, who is writing a thesis about her belief that there is a "terrible power", "strong enough to destroy the world – buried within each of us." If she can prove this is the case, she hopes that the scientific community will abandon their experiments with nuclear power and other weapons of mass destruction. When Branding tells Myra that she is looking for a special girl to experiment with, Myra suggests Nancy.

Myra and her friend Nola deliberately switch a chemical to burn Nancy during chemistry class, causing her to react violently. Intrigued, Branding later talks with Nancy and gains her confidence. She then asks Nancy if she may hypnotize her, and Nancy agrees. Branding places an amulet from antiquity around her neck, telling Nancy that it came from the Carpathian Mountains region and is capable of healing and destroying– and has the ability to release frightening powers. As Nancy gazes at the amulet, Branding hypnotizes her and instructs her to always obey her.

Later, Eddie and two local boys, Tab and Joe, climb up into the girls' room as they are having Nancy's initiation party. In a nearby building, Branding hears the noise and, despite the distance, is able to re-hypnotize Nancy, turning her into a vampire. The party is broken up by the disciplinarian Miss Rivers, who then sends Nola to the basement to fetch supplies. While in the basement, Nola is attacked by something subhuman and killed.

The next morning, as policeman Detective-Sergeant Stewart investigates the killing, Nancy cannot wake up until Branding orders her. When she relates a nightmare she had, Branding orders her to forget it.

At police headquarters, the coroner informs Lt. Dunlap that he found two puncture wounds in Nola's jugular vein and that the body was drained of blood. A young assistant to the coroner, Mike, who shared a room in med school with "an exchange student from a small town in the Carpathian Mountains", remembers his friend's stories about vampires. Dunlap is unimpressed in the theory.

The girls later organize a Halloween scavenger hunt in the local cemetery, and Nancy is again transformed into a vampire and kills Terry, one of the girls, as well as Tab. The police subject all the girls in the scavenger hunt to a lie-detector test. However, Branding is able to alter Nancy's responses to the questions by remote hypnosis.

Back at the school, Nancy, confused and frightened by her transformations, begs for Branding's help. But Branding assures her that the experiment will soon be over and that she will be proud of her part in saving humanity from self-destruction. The state threatens to close the school over the unsolved murders, and consequently, Thorndyke asks Branding to take over some of her duties while she attempts to calm concerned parents. Nancy's boyfriend from back home, Glenn, arrives at the school, being alarmed at the news stories of the slaughters, but Nancy now acts coldly towards Glenn; but only because she is concerned that she might suddenly have an urge to kill Glenn.

After leaving Glenn, Nancy enters Miss Branding's laboratory, begging to be released from the experiment, but the obsessed Branding refuses and hypnotizes Nancy, who again becomes a brutal vampiress; this time she attacks Branding, succeeding to strangle her to death with the amulet's chain. During the struggle, Branding pushes Nancy away. Nancy falls and is impaled on a broken piece of furniture, killing her. Glenn, Mrs. Thorndyke, and Myra break through a locked door to gain entrance into the laboratory and see that Branding's written thesis has been destroyed after being soaked with acid.

== Cast ==
- Sandra Harrison as Nancy Perkins
- Louise Lewis as Miss Branding, chemistry teacher
- Gail Ganley as Myra
- Jerry Blaine as Tab
- Heather Ames as Nola
- Mary Adams as Mrs. Thorndyke
- Edna Holland as Miss Rivers, art teacher
- Thomas B. Henry as Mr. Paul Perkins
- Jeanne Dean as Mrs. Doris Perkins
- Don Devlin as Eddie
- Malcolm Atterbury as Lt. Dunlap
- Richard Devon as Det. Sgt. Stewart
- Craig Duncan as police officer
- Carlyle Mitchell as Stanley Mayther
- Voltaire Perkins as Dr. Lawson
- Paul Maxwell as Mike, the young doctor
- Shirley De Lancey as Terry
- Michael Hall as Glenn
- Barbara Wilson as Ann
- Jimmy Hayes as Joe
- Lynn Alden as Linda

== Production notes ==
The film bears a striking resemblance to AIP's earlier summer box office hit, I Was a Teenage Werewolf. With a story and screenplay credit by I Was a Teenage Werewolf writer Ralph Thornton (a pseudonym for AIP producer Herman Cohen and Aben Kandel), Blood of Dracula features many other similarities to Werewolf.

== Reception ==
Upon its theatrical release, the United States Conference of Catholic Bishops described the film as a "Low-budget chiller...in which a new student at a girl's prep school turns into a murderous vampire after falling under the hypnotic spell of the school's feminist science teacher ... Stylized violence, hokey menace and sexual innuendo" and gave the film an "Adults Only" rating.

For its DVD release, DVD Verdict wrote: "Blood of Dracula has nothing to do with Dracula, but rather taints the vampire legend into the fate of a cranky teenage girl. The film basically takes the same route as I Was a Teenage Werewolf, but never lives up to that effort, especially with Harrison's monster turns kept to a bare minimum. But her wild bat make-up is memorable, looking closer to 'Nosferatu' with big hair than anything else, and an impromptu musical number, 'Puppy Love' is a hoot."
