= Aben Kandel =

American novelist (1897–1993)

Aben Kandel (August 15, 1897 – January 28, 1993) was an American screenwriter, novelist, and boxer. He was screenwriter on such classic B movies as I Was A Teenage Werewolf, Joan Crawford's final movie Trog, and one of Leonard Nimoy's first starring vehicles, Kid Monk Baroni. He is the father of poet Lenore Kandel and screenwriter Stephen Kandel.

== Biography ==
Born in Berlad, Romania, Kandel came to the United States as a child and was educated at New York University and its law school. He served in the U.S. Army during World War I and later enlisted in the United States Coast and Geodetic Survey.

He began writing novels in 1927 and wrote two hit plays Hot Money (1931) that was filmed as High Pressure (1932) and Hot Money (1936), and translated a German play Die Wunderbar by Geza Herczeg and Karl Farkas together with Irving Caesar where the pair added their own songs calling at The Wonder Bar that was acquired by Al Jolson and filmed in 1934. One of Kandel's unpublished short stories So, You Won't Sing, Eh? was filmed as Sing and Like It (1934). Kandel began writing Hollywood stories and screenplays with Manhattan Moon (1935). His novel City for Conquest (1936), based on some of his experiences as a boxer was made into a James Cagney feature in 1940.

Kandel began writing for American television in 1950 whilst continuing to write screenplays and novels.

In 1957 he began writing several lurid screenplays for producer Herman Cohen, for whom he had written Kid Monk Baroni. Cohen and Kandel collaborated on such classic films such as I Was a Teenage Werewolf, I Was a Teenage Frankenstein, Blood of Dracula (all 1957), How to Make a Monster (1958), Horrors of the Black Museum and The Headless Ghost (both 1959), Konga (1961), Black Zoo, (1963), Berserk! (1967, that he also co-produced), Trog (1970), and Craze (1974). As Kandel was involved in writing prestigious film scripts for major film studies such as MGM and Warner Bros. he used pseudonyms such as Ralph Thornton and Kenneth Langtry.

== Personal life and death ==
Kandel had two children, a son, Stephen and daughter, Lenore. He died of heart failure at the Motion Picture and Television Hospital in 1993, at age 95.

== Novels ==
- Vaudeville (1927)
- Black Sun (1929)
- Ex-Baby (1930)
- Rabbi Burns (1931)
- City for Conquest (1936)

== Filmography ==
=== Films ===
Year	Film	Credit	Notes
1932	High Pressure	Story by	based on his play "Hot Money"
1932	Le bluffeur	Story by	based on his play "Hot Money"
1934	Sing and Like It	Story by	Based on his short story "So You Won't Sing, Eh?"
1935	She Gets Her Man	Screenplay by, Story by	Co-wrote story with David Diamond
1935	Manhattan Moon	Screenplay by	Co-wrote screenplay with Barry Trivers, Ben Grauman Kohn
1936	Hot Money	Story by	Based on his play "Hot Money"
1936	Come Closer, Folks	Story by	
1936	More Than a Secretary	Story by	
1937	Thunder in the City	Screenplay by	Co-wrote screenplay with Robert E. Sherwood, Ákos Tolnay
1937	They Won't Forget	Screenplay by	Based on the novel "Death in the Deep South" by Ward Greene, Co-wrote screenplay with Robert Rossen
1939	Rio	Screenplay by	Co-wrote screenplay with Edwin Justus Mayer, Frank Partos, Stephen Morehouse Avery
1940	City for Conquest	Story by	Based on his Novel of the same name
1943	What's Buzzin', Cousin?	Story by	
1943	The Iron Major	Screenplay by	Co-wrote screenplay with Warren Duff
1943	Three Russian Girls	Screenplay by	Co-wrote screenplay with Dan James
1947	High Conquest	Story by	Based on the novel by James Ramsey Ullman
1952	The Fighter	Screenplay by	Based on the short story "The Mexican" By Jack London, Co-wrote screenplay with Herbert Kline
1952	Kid Monk Baroni	Written By	
1956	Time Table	Screenplay by	Based on a story by Robert Angus
1956	Singing in the Dark	Adaption by	
1957	I Was a Teenage Werewolf	Written By	Co-wrote screenplays with Herman Cohen
1957	Blood of Dracula	Written By	Co-wrote screenplays with Herman Cohen
1957	I Was a Teenage Frankenstein	Written By	Co-wrote screenplays with Herman Cohen
1958	How to Make a Monster	Written By	Co-wrote screenplays with Herman Cohen
1959	Horrors of the Black Museum	Written By	Co-wrote screenplays with Herman Cohen
1959	The Headless Ghost	Written By	Co-wrote screenplays with Herman Cohen
1961	Konga	Written By	Co-wrote screenplays with Herman Cohen
1963	Black Zoo	Written By	Co-wrote screenplays with Herman Cohen
1967	Berserk!	Written By	Co-wrote screenplays with Herman Cohen
1970	Trog	Screenplay by	Based on an original story by Peter Bryan and John Gilling
1974	Craze	Screenplay by	Based on the novel by Henry Seymour, Co-wrote screenplay with Herman Cohen

=== Television ===
Year	TV series	Credit	Notes
1950-51	Studio One in Hollywood	Story by	Episodes "The Blonde Comes First (1950)" & "The Blonde Comes First (1952)"
1950	Big Town	Writer	Episode "The Pay Off"
1951	Repertory Theater	Story by	Episode "Kitty Doone"
1952	Schlitz Playhouse	Writer	Episodes "The Trail", & "The Von Linden File"
1954	The Philip Morris Playhouse	Story by	Episode "Kitty Doone"
1957	General Electric Theater	Writer	Episode "No Skin Off Me"
1960	The Untouchables	Writer	Episode "The Underworld Bank"
1964	Arrest and Trial	Writer	Episode "A Roll of the Dice"
1964	The Man from U.N.C.L.E.	Story by	Episode "The Fiddlesticks Affair"
