= Joseph Mell =

American film and television actor (1915–1977)

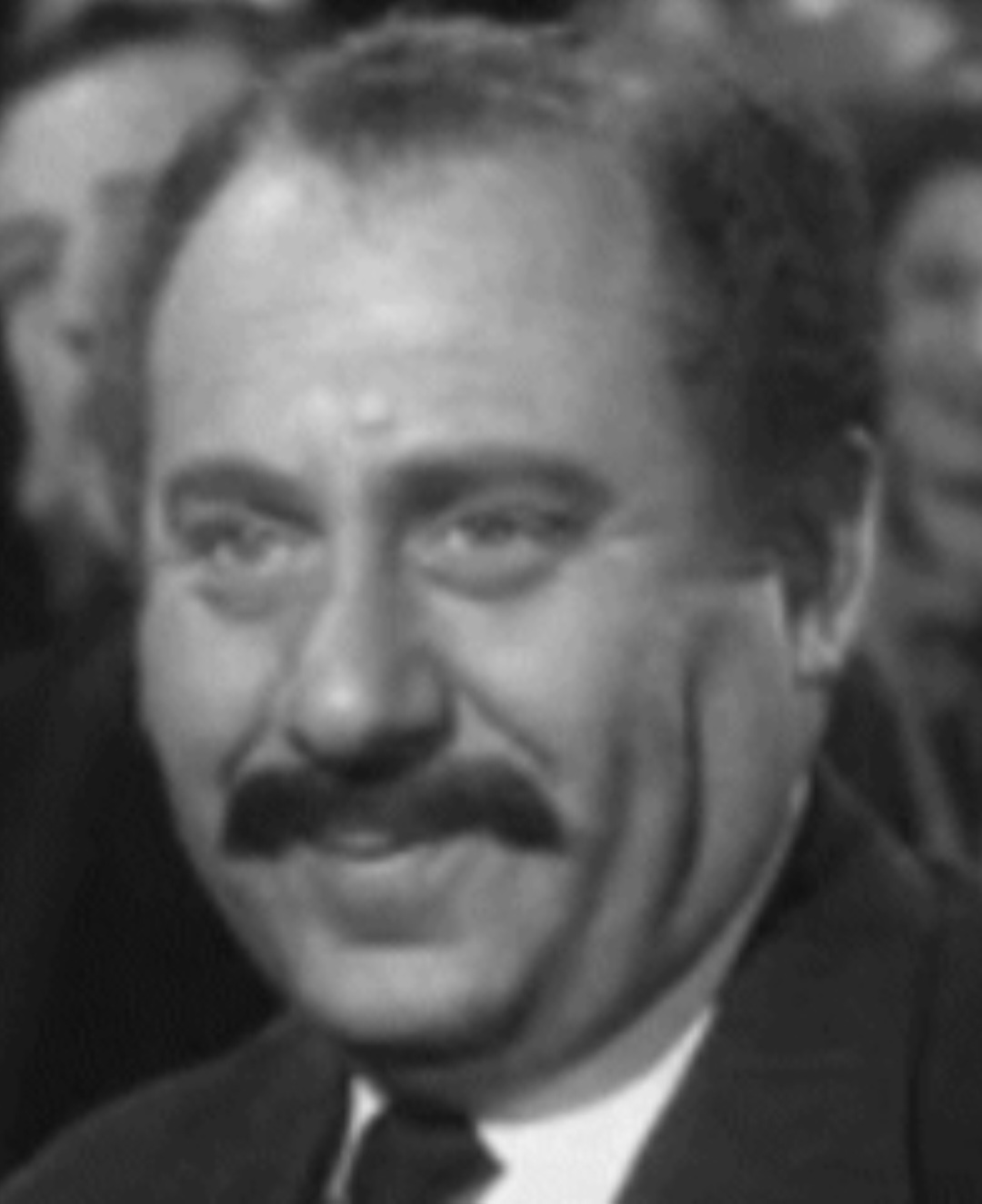
- Mell in Kid Monk Baroni (1952)
- Born: Joseph Mellovitz; June 23, 1915; Chicago, Illinois, U.S.
- Died: August 31, 1977 (aged 62); Los Angeles, California, U.S.
- Occupation: Actor
- Years active: 1951–1977

Joseph Mell (June 23, 1915 – August 31, 1977) was an American film and television actor. He was known for starring as Burt Stone in the 1971 film The Ski Bum.

Mell died on August 31, 1977 in Los Angeles, California, at the age of 62.

== Partial filmography ==
- Hollywood Story (1951) - Sylvester (uncredited)
- When Worlds Collide (1951) - Glen Spiro (uncredited)
- The Big Night (1951) - Mr. Ehrlich, Store Owner (uncredited)
- Just This Once (1952) - Mr. Green (uncredited)
- The Sniper (1952) - Joe, Presser (uncredited)
- Deadline – U.S.A. (1952) - Lugerman (uncredited)
- Singin' in the Rain (1952) - Projectionist (uncredited)
- The Atomic City (1952) - Dr. Gus Schwambach (uncredited)
- Kid Monk Baroni (1952) - Gino Baroni
- Young Man with Ideas (1952) - Municipal Judge (uncredited)
- Actor's and Sin (1952) - George Murry
- Sally and Saint Anne (1952) - Mr. Shapiro (uncredited)
- Monkey Business (1952) - Barber (uncredited)
- My Man and I (1952) - Deputy Commissioner (uncredited)
- Somebody Loves Me (1952) - Barber (uncredited)
- The Prisoner of Zenda (1952) - Railroad Guard (uncredited)
- Tangier Incident (1953) - (uncredited)
- The Glass Wall (1953) - Musician in Men's Room (uncredited)
- The Lady Wants Mink (1953) - Ralph (uncredited)
- One Girl's Confession (1953) - Dock's Worker (uncredited)
- The 49th Man (1953) - Box of Taffy Man at Penn Station
- Siren of Bagdad (1953) - Sultan's Auctioneer (uncredited)
- The Lost Planet (1953) - Lah
- Flame of Calcutta (1953) - Jowal
- The Great Adventures of Captain Kidd (1953) - Greenway (uncredited)
- The Big Heat (1953) - Dr. Kane (uncredited)
- Easy to Love (1953) - Irving, Sleeping Waiter (uncredited)
- Magnificent Obsession (1954) - Dan
- Valley of the Kings (1954) - Antique Dealer (uncredited)
- A Star Is Born (1954) - Paymaster #2 (uncredited)
- Naked Alibi (1954) - Otto Stoltz
- The Silver Chalice (1954) - Minor Role (uncredited)
- The Prodigal (1955) - Tailor (uncredited)
- Ain't Misbehavin' (1955) - Meyer, Beer & Peanut Vendor (uncredited)
- Chicago Syndicate (1955) - Markey (uncredited)
- One Desire (1955) - Franklin, Lamplighter (uncredited)
- All That Heaven Allows (1955) - Mr. Gow, the Butcher (uncredited)
- The Spoilers (1955) - Hotel Proprietor (uncredited)
- The Harder They Fall (1956) - Ring Announcer (uncredited)
- Bigger Than Life (1956) - Frank, the Cab Dispatcher (uncredited)
- The Book of Acts Series (1957) - Herod Agrippa
- Hot Rod Rumble (1957) - Pops
- I Was a Teenage Werewolf (1957) - Dr. Hugo Wagner
- God Is My Partner (1957) - Juror (uncredited)
- No Time to Be Young (1957) - Donaldson (uncredited)
- Jeanne Eagels (1957) - Actors' Equity Representative (uncredited)
- Too Much, Too Soon (1958) - Man at Press Party (uncredited)
- Damn Yankees (1958) - Reporter (uncredited)
- Murder by Contract (1958) - Harry
- City of Fear (1959) - Eddie Crown
- Imitation of Life (1959) - Watchman (uncredited)
- Pillow Talk (1959) - Furniture Dealer (uncredited)
- A Fever in the Blood (1961) - Smith Party Worker (uncredited)
- Tammy Tell Me True (1961) - Jail Guard (uncredited)
- Back Street (1961) - Proprietor
- Black Zoo (1963) - Frank Cramer
- Move Over, Darling (1963) - Stock Clerk (uncredited)
- Looking for Love (1964) - Maitre D' (uncredited)
- Kisses for My President (1964) - Reporter (uncredited)
- 36 Hours (1965) - Lemke
- Brainstorm (1965) - Insane Inmate with Flowers (uncredited)
- Lord Love a Duck (1966) - Dr. Milton Lippman
- The Singing Nun (1966) - Max, TV Technician (uncredited)
- Dead Heat on a Merry-Go-Round (1966) - Mr. Barber (uncredited)
- The Adventures of Bullwhip Griffin (1967) - Fight Rooter (uncredited)
- Thoroughly Modern Millie (1967) - Newspaper Vendor (uncredited)
- Doctor, You've Got to Be Kidding! (1967) - Danny Caplow (uncredited)
- Point Blank (1967) - Minor Role (uncredited)
- Sweet Charity (1969) - Man on Bridge (uncredited)
- The Ski Bum (1971) - Burt Stone
- Murph the Surf (1975) - Reporter
