= Konga (film) =

1961 British film by John Lemont

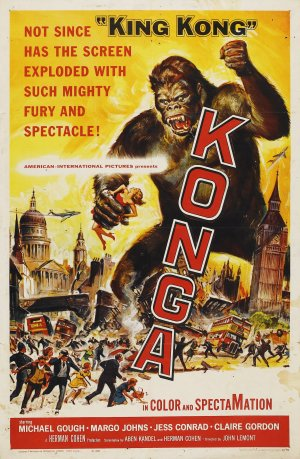
- Theatrical release poster by Reynold Brown
- Directed by: John Lemont
- Written by: Herman Cohen; Aben Kandel
- Produced by: Herman Cohen
- Starring: Michael Gough; Margo Johns; Jess Conrad; Claire Gordon
- Cinematography: Desmond Dickinson
- Edited by: Jack Slade
- Music by: Gerard Schurmann
- Production company: Anglo-Amalgamated
- Distributed by: Anglo-Amalgamated (Eastern hemisphere); American International Pictures (Western hemisphere)
- Release dates: 26 March 1961 (United Kingdom); 22 March 1961 (Boston); 3 May 1961 (United States)
- Running time: 90 minutes
- Countries: United Kingdom; United States
- Budget: $500,000 or £300,000

Konga is a 1961 Eastmancolor monster film directed by John Lemont and starring Michael Gough, Margo Johns and Austin Trevor. It was written by Herman Cohen and Aben Kandel.

It was the basis for a comic book series published by Charlton Comics and initially drawn by Steve Ditko (prior to Ditko's co-creation of Spider-Man) in the 1960s.

== Plot ==
British botanist Dr. Charles Decker comes back from Africa after a year, presumed dead. During that year, he came across a way of growing plants and animals to an enormous size. He brings back a baby chimpanzee, named Konga, to test out his theory. Decker goes insane after he discovers a serum that turns his chimpanzee subject into a ferocious gorilla-sized ape. To further his hideous experiments, he mesmerizes Konga and sends it to London to kill all of his enemies who have more credit in the scientific community than he already has. Among his targets are Dean Foster and Professor Tagore.

During a field trip to the woods with a group of his students he makes an inappropriate advance to Sandra. He is later confronted by her boyfriend Bob and, although seeming to concede to Bob, sends Konga to strangle him.

Decker's assistant and lover Margaret sees him ask Sandra to become both his new assistant and his lover, then sexually assaults Sandra when she refuses. Margaret attempts to get even by hypnotizing Konga into obeying her, then giving him an enormous amount of the strange serum, which turns him into an enormous monster, at which point she becomes Konga's first victim. He keeps growing, and bursts through the roof of the house.

Seeing Decker still attacking Sandra in the greenhouse, the super-sized Konga grabs Decker in one of his enormous hands, while Sandra's arm is seized by one of Decker's carnivorous plants (her ultimate fate is not shown). His rampage comes to a stop when he is attacked by heavily armed soldiers. After he throws Decker to his death, Konga falls. Upon his demise, Konga changes back to a baby chimpanzee.

== Cast ==
- Michael Gough as Dr. Charles Decker
- Margo Johns as Margaret
- Jess Conrad as Bob Kenton
- Claire Gordon as Sandra Banks
- Austin Trevor as Dean Foster
- Jack Watson as Superintendent Brown
- George Pastell as Professor Tagore
- Vanda Godsell as Mrs. Kenton
- Stanley Morgan as Inspector Lawson
- Grace Arnold as Miss Barnesdell
- Leonard Sachs as John Kenton
- Nicholas Bennett as Daniel
- Kim Tracy as Mary
- Rupert Osborne as Eric Kenton
- Waveney Lee as Janet Kenton
- John Welsh as Commissioner Garland
- Paul Stockman as Konga (uncredited)

== Production ==
Following the success of Herman Cohen's previous British made film Horrors of the Black Museum (1959) that also featured Michael Gough, Nat Cohen (no relation to Herman) of Anglo-Amalgamated asked Cohen for another exploitation film.

As Cohen had long admired King Kong (1933), he thought of a giant ape film shot in colour. Due to Cohen's success with his I Was a Teenage Werewolf (1957), AIP used "I Was a Teenage Gorilla" as the working title. Cohen paid RKO Pictures $25,000 for the rights to the name of Kong for exploitation purposes. Cohen recalled that the special effects for the film, that was one of the first giant monster movies shot in colour (Eastmancolor), took 18 months to complete.

It was shot at Merton Park Studios and in Croydon. The climactic scene in London streets was possible when the producer convinced the police that the scenes could be effectively staged late at night on essentially empty streets. The resultant mayhem was especially alarming for residents, who were awakened by sounds of gunfire. A combination of miniature sets, an actor in a gorilla suit, and use of studio mattes also made the technical aspects of the production look better than its meagre budget would otherwise have allowed.

Paul Stockman (uncredited) was the actor inside the ape suit. In an interview, he revealed: "How I came to get the part of Konga: my agent told me there was an American producer looking for a six-foot actor. Would I go to Mac's Rehearsal Rooms, Leicester Square, London? So I toddled along; I walked into the room and there's 20 six-foot tall blokes! I thought, "Oh, dear, it's a lineup!" Anyway, the producer Herman Cohen came in carrying a big cardboard box. He said, "The actor I need must be exactly six foot, so if you're six foot, one or five foot, eleven, thank you for coming but you won't do". So everybody left except three, two other guys and myself. The producer then opened a cardboard box and took out the gorilla headpiece. He said, "Now I'd like all three of you to try this on because the guy who gets the part will have to wear this six to eight hours a day, so see how you feel with it". So, we each put the gorilla head on. The other two had blue eyes and I've got brown eyes. And we all knew a gorilla has brown eyes. So that was how I got the part!"

== Release ==
The film was distributed in the United States by American International Pictures (AIP) as a double feature with Master of the World (1961). Anglo Amalgamated and AIP each provided half the funding for the US$500,000 film, with each studio receiving distribution rights in their respective hemispheres.

== Critical reception ==
The Monthly Film Bulletin wrote: "The picture has undeniable exuberance, but defects in the acting and direction, slow development and ludicrously inadequate dialogue reduce the obviously intended thrills to ridicule. Further more the climax, compared to King Kong, is unimpressive and the trick work is deplorable. Though good for a laugh, the film is in every other respect a wasted opportunity."

In The New York Times, Eugene Archer noted the film played to "misplaced guffaws" and wrote: "... the British 'Konga' is nothing more than an overblown 'King Kong', hammily played by Michael Gough and an improbable-looking ape".

James Lowder reviewed Konga in White Wolf Inphobia #56 (June, 1995), rating it a 1 out of 5 and stated that "The film is [...] very clearly a British production. What does Konga do to prove his serum-improved intellect? Make tea, of course. And while Konga's script is rife with typical monster-movie dialogue [...] it's delivered with less enthusiasm than test match scores on the nightly news. It's almost as it Konga is more of an annoyance than a source of wonder and horror; while the audience is free to agree with that sentiment, the film's characters clearly should not."

In a later review, Time Out wrote that Konga was considered: "Inept, silly, and ludicrously enjoyable monster movie, with Gough as the mad boffin who injects a chimp with a growth serum, only to see it turn into an uncredited actor in a gorilla suit. Thereafter the ape grabs a Michael Gough doll and heads for Big Ben. Deeply political".

On Rotten Tomatoes, the film holds an approval rating of 33% based on 6 reviews, with a weighted average rating of 4.4/10.

Konga
- Konga battles "the Creature from Uuang-Ni", from issue #23 of the Konga comic book published by Charlton Comics

Publication information
- Publisher: Charlton Comics
- Schedule: Bi-monthly
- Format: Ongoing series
- Genre: Fantasy
- Publication date: Konga: June 1960 – Nov. 1965; The Return of Konga: Jan. 1962; Konga's Revenge: summer 1963 – fall 1964; Konga's Revenge (vol. 2): 1968
- No. of issues: Konga: 23; The Return of Konga: 1 Konga's Revenge: 2 Konga's Revenge (vol. 2): 1
- Main character: Konga

Creative team
- Written by: Joe Gill
- Artist(s): Steve Ditko; Dick Giordano; Rocco Mastroserio

== Novel and comic book adaptations ==
A novelization of the film was released in paperback at the time of its original release as Konga by Dudley Dean McGaughey under the pseudonym Dean Owen (Monarch Books 1960).

From 1960 to 1965, Charlton Comics published 23 issues of the comic book Konga. It included work by Spider-Man co-creator Steve Ditko. The series was renamed Fantastic Giants with issue #24, which turned out to be the last issue of the series.

Konga also appeared in a three-issue miniseries that started off as The Return of Konga, before it was renamed Konga's Revenge with issue #2. The series ran from 1962 to 1964 and was followed by a one-shot reprint of issue #3 in 1968.

In 1990, Steve Ditko illustrated a back-up story in Web of Spider-Man Annual #6 called "Child Star". In this story, Captain Universe creates huge versions of toys based on Gorgo and Konga to battle giant monsters that are attacking the neighborhood. For copyright reasons, Konga's name was altered to "Kongo". This sequence was Ditko paying homage to his earlier work with these two characters in their 1960s Charlton Comics comic book series.

Some of these issues were reprinted (in black and white) in a trade paperback in 2011 called Angry Apes n' Leapin Lizards.

In August 2013, IDW Publishing reprinted all the issues that artist Steve Ditko worked on (Konga #1 and 3–15 and Konga's Revenge #2) as a deluxe hardcover collection called Ditko's Monsters: Konga!. In April 2019, IDW published a book called Ditko's Monsters: Gorgo vs. Konga which collected issues #5 and 6 of the series.

Starting in March 2023, PS Artbooks began reprinting the entire series in a series of hardcover and trade paperback editions.
