= Gary Conway =

American actor and screenwriter

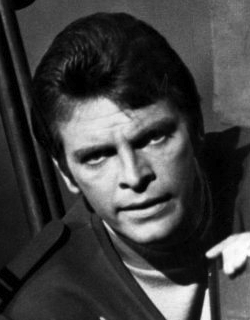
- Conway, c. 1969
- Born: February 4, 1936 (age 90); Boston, Massachusetts, U.S.
- Occupations: Actor, winemaker
- Years active: 1957–present
- Spouse: Marian McKnight (m. 1958)
- Children: 2

Gary Conway (born February 4, 1936) is an American actor and screenwriter. His notable credits include a co-starring role with Gene Barry in the detective series Burke's Law from 1963 to 1965. In addition, he starred in the Irwin Allen sci-fi series Land of the Giants from 1968 to 1970.

== Life ==
Conway married Marian McKnight (Miss America, 1957). They met while students at the University of California, Los Angeles, where Conway studied art. The couple have two children, Gareth and Kathleen. Conway and McKnight have worked together in film production and writing. They owned a winery called Carmody McKnight that they started in 1985. They sold it to the Wonderful Company (Justin Vineyards & Winery) in 2019.

== Career ==
Conway's early film credits include the cult horror films I Was a Teenage Frankenstein (1957) as the monster, How to Make a Monster (1958), and The Saga of the Viking Women and Their Voyage to the Waters of the Great Sea Serpent (1958). In 1958, he was cast in the Man Hunt episode of the Western aviation television series Sky King with Kirby Grant, Richard Beymer, and Gloria Winters.

In 1960, Conway appeared as Orderly on the TV Western Maverick in the episode titled Thunder from the North. In 1960, Conway appeared as Lt. Charles Williams in the episode Absent Without Leave of the ABC/Warner Bros. Western series Colt .45. In 1960, he appeared in three episodes (as three different characters of the ABC/WB crime drama Bourbon Street Beat, starring Andrew Duggan. In 1966, he made an unsuccessful television pilot Assault!, made by the producers of Combat! about the US Marine Corps in the Pacific in 1942. From 1968 to 1970, Conway starred in the TV series Land of the Giants as Captain Steve Burton. Conway starred with Bette Davis in the 1972 television movie The Judge and Jake Wyler. He also guest-starred as the murder victim in the 1973 Columbo episode "Any Old Port in a Storm". Other film credits include Young Guns of Texas (1962), Black Gunn (1972), The Farmer (1977), Once Is Not Enough (1975), American Ninja 2: The Confrontation (1987), and Liberty & Bash (1989). In 1987, Conway had teamed up with Dean Zanetos to form a new production-distribution company, Ambush Entertainment Corporation, which started with a three-feature program, in order to contemplate [sic] video and TV projects as well.
