= How to Make a Monster (1958 film) =

1959 film by Herbert L. Strock

- Theatrical release poster by Reynold Brown
- Directed by: Herbert L. Strock
- Written by: Herman Cohen; Aben Kandel
- Produced by: Herman Cohen; James H. Nicholson
- Starring: Robert H. Harris; Gary Conway; Gary Clarke; Morris Ankrum; Paul Brinegar; Robert Shayne; John Ashley
- Cinematography: Maury Gertsman
- Music by: Paul Dunlap
- Distributed by: American International Pictures
- Release date: September 3, 1958
- Running time: 73 minutes
- Country: United States
- Language: English
- Budget: $100,000 (est.)

How to Make a Monster is a 1958 American horror film drama. It was produced and written by Herman Cohen, directed by Herbert L. Strock, and starring Gary Conway, Robert H. Harris, Paul Brinegar, Morris Ankrum, Robert Shayne, and John Ashley (as himself). The film was released by American International Pictures on July 30, 1958. It played on September 3, 1958 on a double feature with Teenage Caveman. The film is notable for its inclusion of props and studios that were actually used in actual sci-fi horror movies.

The film is a follow-up to both I Was a Teenage Werewolf and I Was a Teenage Frankenstein. Like Teenage Frankenstein, a black-and-white film that switches to color in its final moments, How to Make a Monster was filmed in black-and-white and only the last reel (the fire scene finale) is in full color.

== Plot ==
Pete Dumond, chief make-up artist for 25 years at American International Studios, will be fired after the studio is purchased by NBN Associates. The new management from the East, Jeffrey Clayton and John Nixon, plan to make musicals and comedies instead of the horror pictures for which Pete has created his remarkable monster make-ups and made the studio famous. The new owners show Pete one of their new rock musical numbers on stage which features John Ashley. In retaliation, Pete vows to use the very monsters these men have rejected to destroy them in revenge.

By mixing a numbing ingredient into his foundation cream and persuading the young actors that their careers are through unless they place themselves in his power, he creates a cream that deadens the willpower of whoever has it applied on them. In effect, he manages to draw the unsuspecting Larry Drake and Tony Mantell (each playing monsters in Werewolf Meets Frankenstein) into his control. Pete urges Larry, in Teenage werewolf make-up, to kill Nixon in the studio projection room. Next day, studio guard Monahan, an amateur detective, stops in at the make-up room. He shows Pete and Rivero, Pete's make-up assistant, his little black book in which he has jotted down many interesting facts, such as the late time (9:12PM) Pete and Rivero checked out the night of Jeffrey Clayton's murder. He explains he hopes to work his way up to chief of security on the lot. Apprehensive, Pete makes himself up as a terrifying split-faced Caveman, one of his own creations and kills Monahan in the studio commissary while Monahan makes his rounds that night. Richards, the older guard, sees and hears nothing of the struggle, but discovers the missing Monahan's body. Later, Pete orders the unknowing Tony, in Teenage Frankenstein make-up, to attack Clayton and choke him to death after he arrives home at night in his 1958 Lincoln convertible.

Police investigators uncover two clues: a maid, Millie, describes Frankenstein's monster (Tony, in make-up), who struck her down as he fled from the scene of Clayton's murder, and the police laboratory technician discovers a peculiar ingredient in the make-up left on Clayton's fingernails from his death struggle with Tony. The formula matches bits found in Pete's old make-up room.

The police head for Pete's house. Pete has taken Rivero, Larry and Tony to his home for a grim farewell party, his house being a museum of all the monsters that he created in his 25 years at the studio. Pete, distrusting Rivero, stabs him to death when they are alone in the kitchen. Learning that Larry and Tony are trying to leave the locked living room, he attacks them both with the knife.

Larry awkwardly knocks over a candelabra, setting the monster museum on fire, and Pete is burned to death, trying in vain to save the heads of his monstrous "children" mounted on the walls. The police break through the locked door just before the flames reach the boys, and they save Larry and Tony.

== Cast ==
- Robert H. Harris as Pete Dumond
- Gary Conway as Tony Mantell / the Teenage Frankenstein
- Gary Clarke as Larry Drake / the Teenage Werewolf
- Paul Brinegar as Rivero
- Malcolm Atterbury as Security Guard Richards
- Dennis Cross as Security Guard Monahan
- Morris Ankrum as Police Capt. Hancock
- Walter Reed as Detective Thompson
- Paul Maxwell as Jeffrey Clayton
- Eddie Marr as John Nixon
- Heather Ames as Arlene Dow
- Robert Shayne as Gary Droz
- John Phillips as Detective Jones
- Paulene Myers as Millie
- John Ashley as himself

== Production ==
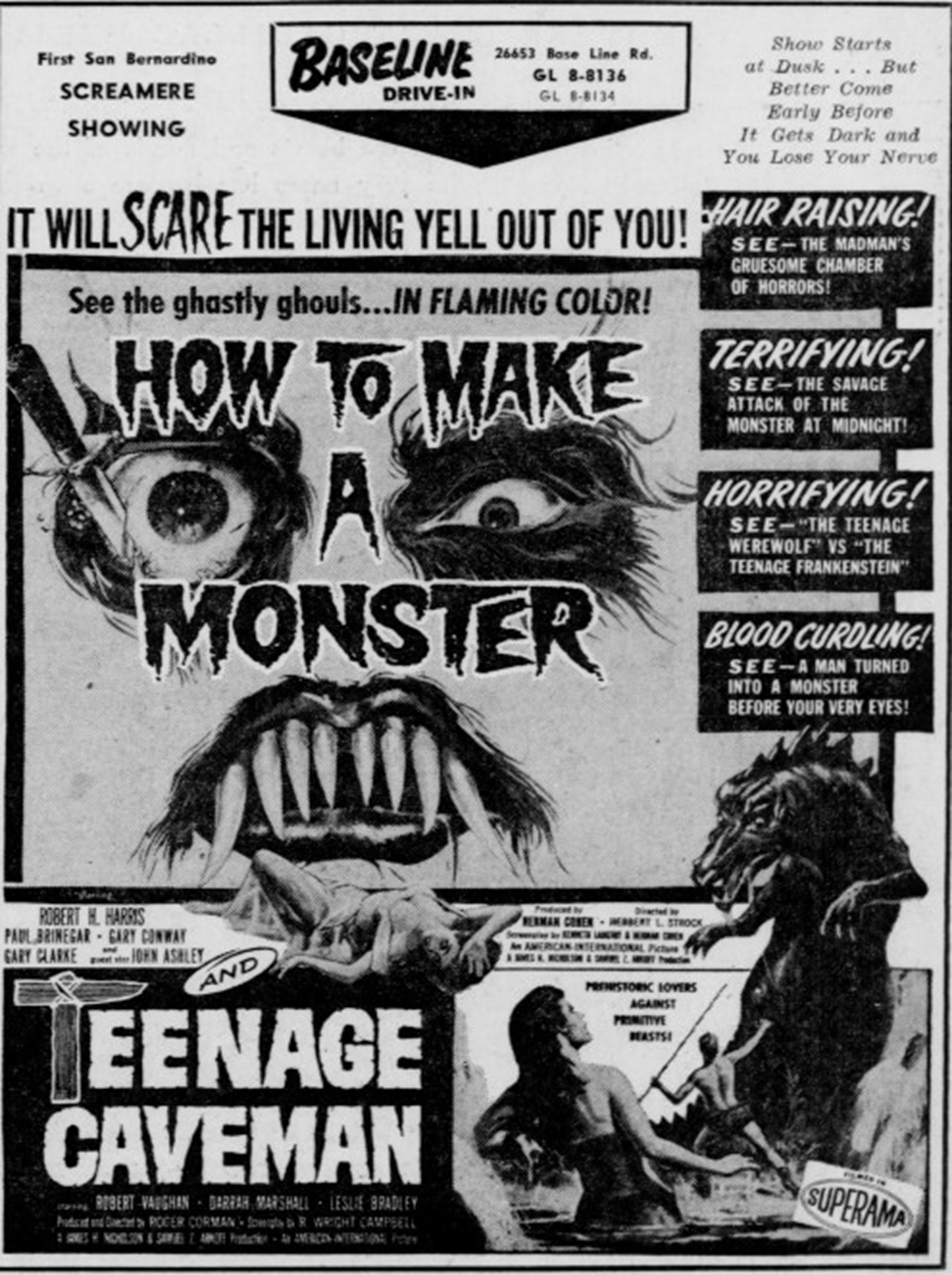
Drive-in advertisement from 1958 featuring How to Make a Monster with companion feature, Teenage Caveman.

Many of Pete Dumond's "children" destroyed in the fire were props originally created by Paul Blaisdell for earlier AIP films, and he actually allowed the props to be destroyed. They include The Cat Girl (1957), "Beulah" from It Conquered the World (1956), Invasion of the Saucer Men (1957) and the Dr. Jekyll mask from Attack of the Puppet People (1958). Blaisdell also created a brand new monster costume he dubbed "Aunt Esmeralda" which he created specifically to be burned in the fire scene (designed so that as the face melted, a grisly skull was revealed underneath). Blaisdell's She-Creature mask was also in the scene but miraculously was not destroyed.

Blaisdell had specifically asked AIP not to burn his Cat Girl mask, but it was carelessly destroyed in the fire anyway. (To compound the tragedy, the cameraman failed to film the Cat Girl mask as it was burning.) The whole incident left a bad taste in Blaisdell's mouth.

Herman Cohen says he cast John Ashley as a singer at the request of James H. Nicholson, who had just put Ashley under a long-term contract with the studio. Ashley was having some minor success as a recording artist at the time.

AIP did not have a physical studio, so the film was shot at Ziv Studios. During production there, a sign was put up that called the studio lot "American International Studios", which was totally misleading.

Ed Wood's widow Kathy claimed in a 1992 interview that her husband always felt that the idea for How To Make a Monster was stolen from him by AIP producer Sam Arkoff. She said "Eddie condemned Arkoff, he really hated him. Eddie gave them a script for approval, and they changed the characters a little bit around. Eddie had written it for Lugosi. It was about this old horror actor who couldn't get work any more, so he took his vengeance out on the studio. (They changed it to) a make-up man who takes revenge on a studio." Arkoff denied Wood's claim was true, stating that Herman Cohen originated the entire project on his own.

== Other releases ==
In 2001, producer and special effects artist Stan Winston, remade the film as part of his Creature Features series.

Scream Factory's 2020 Blu-ray release features an audio commentary by Tom Weaver.

Svengoolie featured the film on June 12, 2021, again on December 11, 2021, on June 25, 2022, February 24, 2024 and most recently April 25, 2026.
