= High Pressure (film) =

1932 film

- Theatrical Film Poster
- Directed by: Mervyn LeRoy
- Screenplay by: Joseph Jackson
- Based on: Hot Money; 1931 play by Aben Kandel
- Starring: William Powell
- Cinematography: Robert Kurrle
- Edited by: Ralph Dawson
- Distributed by: Warner Bros. Pictures
- Release date: January 30, 1932
- Running time: 74 minutes
- Country: United States
- Language: English

High Pressure is a 1932 American pre-Code comedy film directed by Mervyn LeRoy and starring William Powell and Evelyn Brent. It is based on the play Hot Money by Aben Kandel. The film is preserved at the Library of Congress and in the Warner Archive Collection.

== Plot ==
Gar Evans agrees to promote Ginsburg's product, artificial rubber created from sewage, only after his friend Mike Donahey assures him it is not a scam. Gar is superstitious; he believes he will only succeed if his long-suffering girlfriend Francine Dale joins them on the venture. She, however, has given up on him, especially since he left her five days before to pick up something, and never came back. It is only with great effort that he convinces her to give him another chance.

Gar quickly incorporates the "Golden Gate Artificial Rubber Company", rents a whole floor of a building, installs old crony Clifford Gray as president, gives Helen Wilson a job as a secretary, and hires a lot of high-pressure salesmen to sell shares. As news spreads, natural rubber company stock prices start to fall, and Mr. Banks offers to buy the company on behalf of the established rubber firms, but the bid is too low for Gar. Banks then threatens to get an injunction preventing sales of Gar's shares pending an investigation. Gar welcomes it.

However, Ginsburg (promoted to "Colonel" by Gar), has misplaced the inventor of the process, Dr. Rudolph Pfeiffer. When he is finally located and set to work making a sample, Gar invites scientists to inspect the finished product, only to discover that Pfeiffer is a deranged crackpot (his next invention involves hens laying pre-decorated Easter eggs). Francine quits in disgust and prepares to sail to South America and marry Señor Rodriguez. Despite his lawyer's advice to flee to another state, Gar insists on taking full responsibility.

Just as all seems lost, Banks offers to reimburse all the shareholders and pay Gar enough to make a $100,000 profit just to be rid of the whole mess (and restore natural rubber stock prices). Gar rushes to the dock to retrieve the Golden Gate controlling shares, which he had signed over to Francine. While there, he wins her back by promising to give up promoting, only to have Donahey show up with a scheme for Alaskan gold/marble/spruce wood. Within seconds, Gar is plotting his next campaign.

== Cast ==
- William Powell as Gar Evans
- Evelyn Brent as Francine Dale
- George Sidney as Ginsburg
- John Wray as Jimmy Moore, Gar's lawyer
- Evalyn Knapp as Helen Wilson
- Guy Kibbee as Clifford Gray
- Frank McHugh as Mike Donahey
- Oscar Apfel as Mr. Hackett, from the Better Business Bureau
- Ben Alexander as Geoffrey Weston, Helen's jealous boyfriend
- Harold Waldrige as Gus Vanderbilt, hired solely for his impressive last name
- Charles Middleton as Mr. Banks
- Harry Beresford as Dr. Rudolph Pfeiffer
- André Luguet as Senor Rodriguez, Francine's South American fiancé

== Reception ==
In his New York Times review, Mordaunt Hall described High Pressure as "a brightly written and constantly amusing film". Hall noted that "William Powell is in his element" and "is an excellent type for this tale." Sidney and Kibbee were also praised for their performances.

Variety praised the performances of the cast and wrote of William Powell and George Sidney "grabbing the picture most of the way, Sidney for laughs and Powell for the action." It continued, "Rest of the cast very good, with still more excellent casting of salesmen types in the ‘boiler-room’ sequence. Whoever framed this scene must have had experience, for it’s perfect."

The Film Daily gave a positive review, and wrote, "William Powell has one of his best roles in a long time as an ace promoter who lives only for his big deals. For comedy running mate, George Sidney is a wow ... There is plenty of action, good comedy, and not a dull moment."

International Photographer said the film "contained much to commend it as entertainment" and that it "should be enjoyed by the throng of men and women who like Powell."
