= Herbert L. Strock =

American film director

- Born: January 13, 1918
- Died: November 30, 2005 (age 87)
- Occupation(s): Television producer, director

Herbert L. Strock (January 13, 1918 – November 30, 2005) was an American television producer and director, and a B-movie director of titles such as I Was a Teenage Frankenstein (1957), How to Make a Monster (1958), and The Crawling Hand (1963).

== Career ==
Strock was born in Boston, and moved with his family to Los Angeles when he was 13. By 17, while a student at Beverly Hills High School, Strock was director of gossip columnist Jimmy Fidler's Hollywood segments for Fox Movietone News. Strock graduated in 1941 from USC, where he studied journalism and film. During World War II, he served in the Army's Ordnance Motion Picture Division. He was assistant editor on the 1944 film Gaslight for MGM.

In a "pioneering" television career that began in the 1940s, Strock was involved with many television series including The Cases of Eddie Drake. Highway Patrol, Sea Hunt, Science Fiction Theatre and I Led 3 Lives for Ziv Television Programs, and Sky King and The Veil.

Other directorial efforts included I Was a Teenage Frankenstein, Blood of Dracula and How to Make a Monster for producer Herman Cohen and Ivan Tors' "Office of Scientific Investigation" trilogy, which included The Magnetic Monster, Riders to the Stars and Gog, which was shot in 3-D, as well as the Korean War film Battle Taxi.

Strock directed several Warner Bros. Television series such as The Alaskans, Bronco, Maverick, Sugarfoot, Colt .45, 77 Sunset Strip and Cheyenne. He continued with the B pictures The Crawling Hand, The Devil's Messenger which was an edited television pilot and Rider on a Dead Horse.

In 2000, Strock published a memoir, Picture Perfect.

== Death ==
Strock died after a car accident in Moreno Valley, California on November 30, 2005.
