= Kid Monk Baroni =

1952 film by Harold D. Schuster

- Directed by: Harold D. Schuster
- Written by: Aben Kandel (original screenplay); Dick Conway (additional dialogue)
- Produced by: Jack Broder (producer); Herman Cohen (associate producer)
- Starring: See below
- Cinematography: Charles Van Enger
- Edited by: Jason H. Bernie
- Music by: Herschel Burke Gilbert
- Production company: Jack Broder Productions Inc.
- Distributed by: Realart Pictures
- Release date: May 1, 1952
- Running time: 80 minutes
- Country: United States
- Language: English

Kid Monk Baroni (UK title: Young Paul Baroni) is a 1952 American sports film noir directed by Harold D. Schuster, written by Aben Kandel and Dick Conway and starring Leonard Nimoy and Jack Larson.

== Plot ==
A disfigured street kid, a member of the Billy Goat Gang, is shown how to box by parish priest Father Callahan, who also makes him part of the church choir. The priest introduces him to Emily. During a fight with the other members of the Billy Goat Gang for ridiculing his church vestments, he accidentally knocks Father Callahan unconscious and flees to avoid the repercussions. He enters amateur bouts and then undergoes plastic surgery to correct his disfigurement. After the surgery, Monk becomes even more conceited, losing the respect of Angelo and Emily, and his manager convinces him to resume fighting to address his unpaid bills.

During his comeback fight, Monk drops his dirty tactics and his opponent wins by a split decision. His syndicate plans recoup its losses by forcing his return to dirty fighting. In the next fight after Monk’s reform, Father Callahan and Emily are in the audience for his match against the Wildcat, which Monk loses to in Round 6, costing the syndicate $20,000. Father Callahan congratulates Monk on his new ethics, and Monk and Emily reunite and marry to further Father Callahan’s sports initiative.

== Cast ==
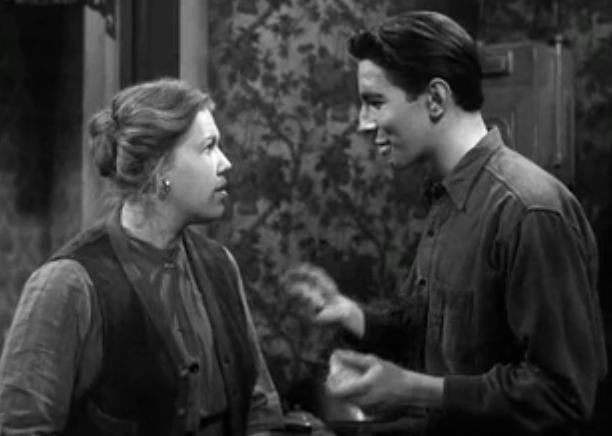
Kathleen Freeman and Leonard Nimoy

- Leonard Nimoy as Paul "Monk" Baroni
- Richard Rober as Father Callahan
- Bruce Cabot as Mr. Hellman
- Allene Roberts as Emily Brooks
- Mona Knox as June Travers
- Kathleen Freeman as Maria Baroni
- Joseph Mell as Gino Baroni
- Paul Maxey as Mr. Al Petry
- Stuart Randall as Mr. Moore
- Madelynn Broder as Girl in Church
- Jack Larson as Angelo
- Budd Jaxon as Knuckles
- Chad Mallory as Tony
- Ted Avery as Joey
- Archer MacDonald as Pete

== Reception ==
The Monthly Film Bulletin wrote: "This is a very moral film, with enough good rounds to hold the interest of boxing enthusiasts. The story is weak, but the film (called in America Kid Monk Baroni) is quite competently produced and the players do their best to infuse enthusiasm."

Kine Weekly wrote: "The picture's intentions are good, but religion, romance and fisticuffs do not make ideal bedfellows. Richard Rober impresses as Father Callahan, and Leonard Nimoy has his moments as the ugly Paul, but the supporting cast is small fry. At least, it should have carried a decisive wallop in its final reel."

In a review for Variety, William Brogdon wrote: "Only mild melodrama interest is stirred up in this programmer; it's a routine lowercaser. Scripting is involved and unimaginative, as are the presentation, direction and playing."

Boxoffice wrote: "Arrestingly well done is this seamy-side-of-life drama, which is built around the prizefight game but which boasts enough additional situations to endow it with a wide appeal to others than the fans who can be expected as established customers of films projecting legalized mayhem. Most prominent among those away-from-formula facets is the one which gives the picture a strong and realistic spiritual tone."
