= Berserk! =

1967 British film by Jim O'Connolly

- Original U.S. theatrical release poster
- Directed by: Jim O'Connolly
- Written by: Herman Cohen; Aben Kandel
- Produced by: Herman Cohen
- Starring: Joan Crawford; Ty Hardin; Diana Dors; Michael Gough; Judy Geeson
- Cinematography: Desmond Dickinson
- Edited by: Raymond Poulton
- Music by: John Scott
- Distributed by: Columbia Pictures
- Release dates: September 1967 (UK); 11 January 1968 (US)
- Running time: 96 minutes
- Country: United Kingdom
- Language: English
- Box office: $3,195,000

Berserk! (Note: The opening credits do not include an exclamation mark in the title.) is a 1967 British horror-thriller film directed by Jim O'Connolly and starring Joan Crawford, Ty Hardin, Diana Dors and Judy Geeson. The screenplay was written by Herman Cohen and Aben Kandel.

Berserk! marked Crawford's penultimate feature-film appearance.

== Plot ==
Monica Rivers owns a travelling circus that tours England. Monica is ringmistress, and Albert Durando is business manager. During one performance, tightrope walker Gaspar the Great dies when his rope breaks. Police believe someone tampered with it, but they cannot say who. Monica predicts Gaspar's death will yield great publicity and bigger audiences. Albert is shocked by her insensitivity. He asks her to buy out his share of the circus, but she is unable. Instead, she replaces Gaspar with daring, handsome tightrope artist Frank Hawkins. He is renowned for performing his act over a carpet of sharp bayonets without a net. Monica is impressed.

Shortly afterwards, Albert is found murdered. The troupe, especially Hawkins, suspect Monica; Hawkins had witnessed her leaving Albert's trailer just before his body was discovered. Hawkins attempts blackmail: he promises Monica his silence if she gives him a share of the circus, and she agrees. In time, the circus enjoys a successful tour of performances—that is, until Monica's daughter, Angela, mysteriously turns up, after her expulsion from school. Monica hires her to perform in a knife-throwing act. Meanwhile, Matilda, another performer, attempts to seduce Hawkins. Monica becomes jealous. Later, Matilda is killed when a magician's trick involving the sawing of a woman in half goes wrong.

A few evenings later, during Hawkins' high-wire performance, Angela is spotted throwing a knife at him. Hawkins falls from his tightrope onto the bayonets and is killed. Angela confesses that she was responsible for the circus murders. She claims it was all due to Monica's absence and inattention throughout her childhood; the deaths were attempts to eliminate the people who consumed Monica's time. Angela then tries to kill her mother but is stopped. While trying to escape capture, she is electrocuted by a live wire outside the circus tent during a rainstorm. Monica sobs inconsolably over her daughter's body.

== Cast ==
- Joan Crawford as Monica Rivers
- Ty Hardin as Frank Hawkins
- Diana Dors as Matilda
- Michael Gough as Albert Dorando
- Judy Geeson as Angela Rivers
- Robert Hardy as Detective Supt. Brooks
- Geoffrey Keen as Commissioner Dalby
- Sydney Tafler as Harrison Liston
- George Claydon as Bruno Fontana
- Philip Madoc as Lazlo
- Ambrosine Phillpotts as Miss Burrows
- Thomas Cimarro as Gaspar
- Peter Burton as Gustavo
- Golda Casimir as bearded lady
- Ted Lune as skeleton man
- Milton Reid as strong man
- Marianne Stone as Wanda
- Miki Iveria as gypsy fortune-teller
- Howard Goorney as Emil
- Reginald Marsh as Sergeant Hutchins
- Bryan Pringle as Constable Bradford

== Production ==
It was the first of a new deal that Herman Cohen had signed with Columbia Pictures. In August 1966, Joan Crawford signed to star, with filming to begin in October in London. Cohen stated that the script was written with Crawford in mind.

Crawford described her role in the film as "mistress of the ceremonies, lock stock and barrel. She's colorful, she's exciting, she's the most definite dame I've ever played. She knows what she wants and she gets it."

Cohen wanted to cast Crawford's daughter Christina Crawford as Angela, but Joan vetoed the idea, and Judy Geeson played the role instead. Diana Dors played a key support role.

Crawford claimed that the filmmakers wanted to title the film Circus of Blood or Circus of Fear, but she insisted on Berserk! "and I got my way in the end." The title was changed in April 1967.

== Reception ==
=== Box office ===
Box office receipts for Berserk! were considerable. In North America, the film grossed more than $1,100,000 and ranked #85 on Variety's list of top money makers of 1968. Box office receipts overseas nearly doubled that amount at $2,095,000. This made Berserk! the most successful film that Herman Cohen had produced.

=== Critical ===
The Monthly Film Bulletin wrote: "Quite the most alarming thing about this horror film Is Joan Crawford's performance, beside which impaled skulls and Diana Dors being sawn in two, pale into insignificance. First glimpsed as a vampiric apparition in black tights and scarlet tailcoat, she soon melts into something more voluminous to gloat over her youthful lover, meanwhile scorching him with basilisk glares of possessiveness and cracking her lines all round the circus like a metaphorical whip. Her efforts, unfortunately, are all to little avail, as the script is rudimentary to say the least ... The denouement – after a rather good sequence of Ty Hardin's last high-wire act and demise – must be one of the most perfunctory on record, with climactic murder, confession and retribution all whizzing by in about thirty seconds flat."

Variety wrote: "Story is full of holes, but it makes no difference. All the elements of the thrill picture are present. Promotion will bring them in. Berserk doesn't have the continuous attention-holding gimmick of, say, Invisible Man or House of Wax, but it fills the gap between its four sensational murders with a colorful array of circus acts and loosely constructed story line. For Joan Crawford, owner and ringmaster (in leotard, red jacket, and top hat) of a circus plagued with brutal killings, it's more of Whatever Happened to Baby Jane? or "Straitjacket effort. All good showmanship."

Howard Thompson wrote a mostly negative review in The New York Times, comparing it unfavorably to Circus of Horrors, but also commented, "It's also hard to make a hopeless movie with a circus background and sawdust aroma. This is the one solid thing the picture has going for it – the intriguing workaday routine of circus folk and some good, spangly ring acts, all handsomely conveyed in excellent color photography. And under the reasonable direction of Jim O'Connolly, the film does project a kind of defiant suspense that dares you not to sit there, see who gets it next and, finally, why." Thompson stated that Crawford "... is professional as usual and certainly the shapeliest ringmaster ever to handle a ring microphone."

Lawrence Quirk wrote in Hollywood Screen Parade that "[Crawford] is all over the picture, radiant, forceful, authoritative, a genuine movie star whose appeal never diminishes."

In The Radio Times Guide to Films Tony Sloman gave the film 2/5 stars, writing: "Here, in the twilight of her career, Joan Crawford stars in a tale about murderous goings-on in a circus, which is at least marginally better than her caveman fiasco Trog. It's a shame to watch an actress of Crawford's stature gawking at such explicit sadism, for many that is this tawdry flick's main appeal. Cheap and nasty."

== Home media ==
Berserk! was released as a manufacture-on-demand Region 1 DVD on 6 September 2011, available online through the Warner Archive Collection and ClassicFlix in the U.S. only.

Mill Creek Entertainment released the film along with Strait-Jacket (1964) as a double-feature Blu-ray on 2 October 2018.
