= Magnificent Roughnecks =

1956 film

- Theatrical release poster
- Directed by: Sherman A. Rose
- Written by: Stephen Kandel
- Produced by: Herman Cohen
- Starring: Jack Carson; Mickey Rooney; Nancy Gates; Jeff Donnell; Myron Healey; Willis Bouchey
- Cinematography: Charles Van Enger
- Edited by: Sherman A. Rose
- Music by: Paul Dunlap; Stephen Kandel
- Production company: Allied Artists Pictures
- Distributed by: Allied Artists Pictures
- Release date: July 22, 1956
- Running time: 73 minutes
- Country: United States
- Language: English

Magnificent Roughnecks is a 1956 American comedy film directed by Sherman A. Rose and written by Stephen Kandel. The film stars Jack Carson, Mickey Rooney, Nancy Gates, Jeff Donnell, Myron Healey and Willis Bouchey. The film was released on July 22, 1956, by Allied Artists Pictures.

== Plot ==
Under contract with an oil company, engineer Bix Decker and geologist Frank Sommers have been working in South America, but now Bix intends to go home. He changes his mind when replacement Jane Rivers shows up, at first skeptical because she's a woman, then eager to work together.

A rival oil rigger, Werner Jackson, enjoys taunting Bix about a woman doing his job and punches Frank when he tries to intervene. Bix is impressed by Jane's work, but when he tries to kiss her, he gets slapped. His girlfriend Julie also is upset at seeing them together.

During an emergency, after a casing fails, Bix and Frank try to drive nitroglycerine to the well to blow it up and extinguish the fire. Werner blocks the way, but Bix uses a bulldozer to cover him in dirt. A gusher erupts, dousing the blaze. It's time for Bix to return home, but his contract is extended six more months so he can stay behind and work with Jane.

== Cast ==
- Jack Carson as Bix Decker
- Mickey Rooney as Frank Sommers
- Nancy Gates as Jane Rivers
- Jeff Donnell as Julie
- Myron Healey as Werner Jackson
- Willis Bouchey as Ernie Biggers
- Eric Feldary as Señor Ramon Serrano
- Alan Wells as Danny
- Frank Gerstle as Chuck Evans
- Larry Carr as Guard
- Matty Fain as Pepi
- Jon Locke as Driver
