= Target Earth (film) =

1954 science fiction film

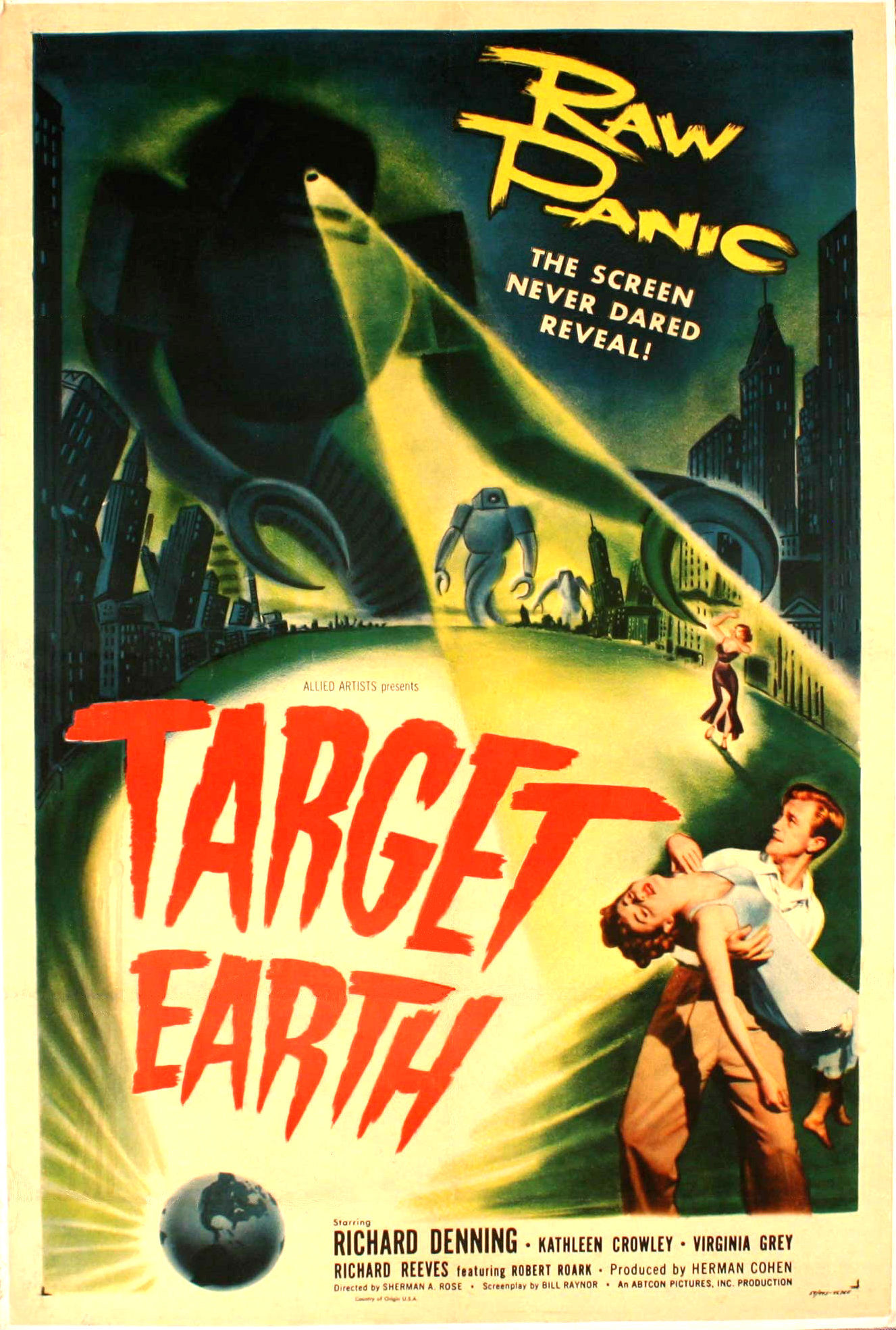
- Theatrical release poster
- Directed by: Sherman A. Rose
- Screenplay by: James H. Nicholson; Wyott Ordung; William Raynor
- Story by: "Deadly City" by Paul W. Fairman
- Produced by: Herman Cohen
- Starring: Richard Denning; Kathleen Crowley; Virginia Grey; Richard Reeves; Robert Roark; Mort Marshall
- Cinematography: Guy Roe
- Edited by: Sherman A. Rose
- Music by: Paul Dunlap
- Production companies: Abtcon Pictures, Inc.
- Distributed by: Allied Artists Pictures Corporation
- Release date: November 7, 1954
- Running time: 75 minutes
- Country: United States
- Language: English
- Budget: $85,000

Target Earth is a 1954 independently made American black-and-white science fiction film, produced by Herman Cohen, directed by Sherman A. Rose, that stars Richard Denning, Kathleen Crowley, Virginia Grey, Richard Reeves and Whit Bissell. It was written by James H. Nicholson, Wyott Ordung and William Raynor based on the story "Deadly City" by Paul W. Fairman (writing as Ivar Jorgenson) in the March 1953 edition of the magazine If: Worlds of Science Fiction. The film was released on November 7, 1954 by Allied Artists Pictures Corporation.

Set in a large, deserted city, the film's storyline follows a small group of people overlooked during the city's mass evacuation, carried out because of a sudden invasion by hostile robotic beings believed to be from the planet Venus.

Target Earth was a typical product of 1950s filmed science fiction but could never rise above its low-budget underpinnings. One of the few notable aspects of the production was that the film was one of the first to explore the subgenre of alien invasions, following the successes of George Pal's The War of the Worlds (1953) and William Cameron Menzies' Invaders from Mars (1953). Target Earth was also produced by Herman Cohen, making his producing debut, who would become one of the most prominent B movie producers of the 1960s. Director Sherman A. Rose, who was a prolific editor in both television and film, would go on to make only two other films. (Note: Rose would direct Magnificent Roughnecks (1956) and Tank Battalion (1958).)

== Plot ==
After an attempt at suicide, Nora King regains consciousness and discovers that her building has no electricity or water, so she wanders into the now quiet, empty streets of the city. Stumbling over the body of a dead woman, who has been killed, she encounters Frank Brooks, who has just recently revived after being beaten unconscious in an overnight robbery.

They join forces to find others in the deserted city. Hearing piano music coming from a nearby cocktail lounge, they come upon a couple, Jim Wilson and Vicki Harris, who are drinking. They were drunkenly incapable of joining the evacuation of the population that took place. Proceeding together as a group, they continue to search the deserted streets, coming upon a car that will not start. Another survivor, Charles Otis, sees them and tells them that the same applies to all the other cars he has tried.

A growing apprehension takes hold as they begin to appreciate that they are alone and must face an unknown menace that has caused the city's evacuation. Charles finds a newspaper in a hotel lobby that proclaims that a "mystery army" is attacking the city from the north. In a panic, he runs outside and is killed by a death ray emitted from an alien robot in the street.

While attempting to defend the city, a military force, led by Lt. Gen. Wood, sets up a command post. After Air Force fighters and bombers are quickly destroyed by the advancing invaders, the use of atomic weapons is considered as a serious option. A group of scientists, including their chief research scientist, finally get their hands on a damaged robot to discover its vulnerabilities.

The small band is joined by Davis, a psychotic killer, who has his own plans for survival. The survivors quickly realize they now have an armed enemy within their small group, as well as the invaders from outer space to deal with. Vicki argues with Davis and in retaliation he shoots Vicki to death. Later on, Jim is killed by one of the invading robots. Finally Army units later arrive in the streets, now with jeeps fully equipped with sonic weapon transmitters directed by large public speakers(bullhorns) that easily dispatches the invading cathoid ray tube robots, busting their tubes which ends their invasion.

== Cast ==
- Richard Denning as Frank Brooks
- Kathleen Crowley as Nora King
- Virginia Grey as Vicki Harris
- Richard Reeves as Jim Wilson
- Robert Roark as Davis
- Whit Bissell as Tom, Chief research scientist
- Arthur Space as Lt. General Wood
- Steve Pendleton as Colonel
- Mort Marshall as Charles Otis
- House Peters Jr. as Technician
- Steve Calvert as the Robot

== Production ==
Principal photography began in mid-July 1954 at Kling Studios, for a tight seven-day shooting schedule that also included outdoor shooting. While the story is set in Chicago, Target Earth was actually filmed in Los Angeles. Empty street scenes were filmed during early morning hours before normal traffic began.

Actor Robert Roark was given a role because his father was a large investor in Target Earth.

Even though a "robot army" is mentioned several times during the film, only one robot was constructed for the production, which was then used in all scenes to depict the invasion. When actor Steve Calvert, who played the robot, was not working on B films, he regularly worked as a bartender at Ciro's on the Sunset Strip. He also played the apes in Bride of the Gorilla (1951) and Bela Lugosi Meets a Brooklyn Gorilla (1952).

== Reception ==
The Monthly Film Bulletin wrote: "After a promising opening sequence, in which the heroine gradually learns that the city is deserted, the film quickly degenerates into routine situations and sentiments. Robots arouse little interest, and the human characters, played with almost uniform lack of conviction, are from stock."

Variety wrote: "What starts out as a promising suspense feature soon turns into an unimaginative potboiler on invaders from space so the entertainment values are lightweight. ... After lhe tense kickoff of the story, it settles down to talk out most of the action, losing suspense as it moves along the 74 minutes."

The Hollywood Reporter wrote: "During the first two reels, this low-budget science-fiction film looks like it is going to be a brilliant job. But having got their story launched, director Sherman A. Rose and scripter William Raynor apparently don't know where to steer it and the development becomes more and more routine."

TV Guide later rated the film 1/4 stars, writing, "The robots are just plain disappointing".

David Maine of PopMatters rated it 6/10 stars and called it "a tight, engaging little thriller that focuses more on character than special effects".
