= I Was a Teenage Werewolf =

1957 film by Gene Fowler Jr

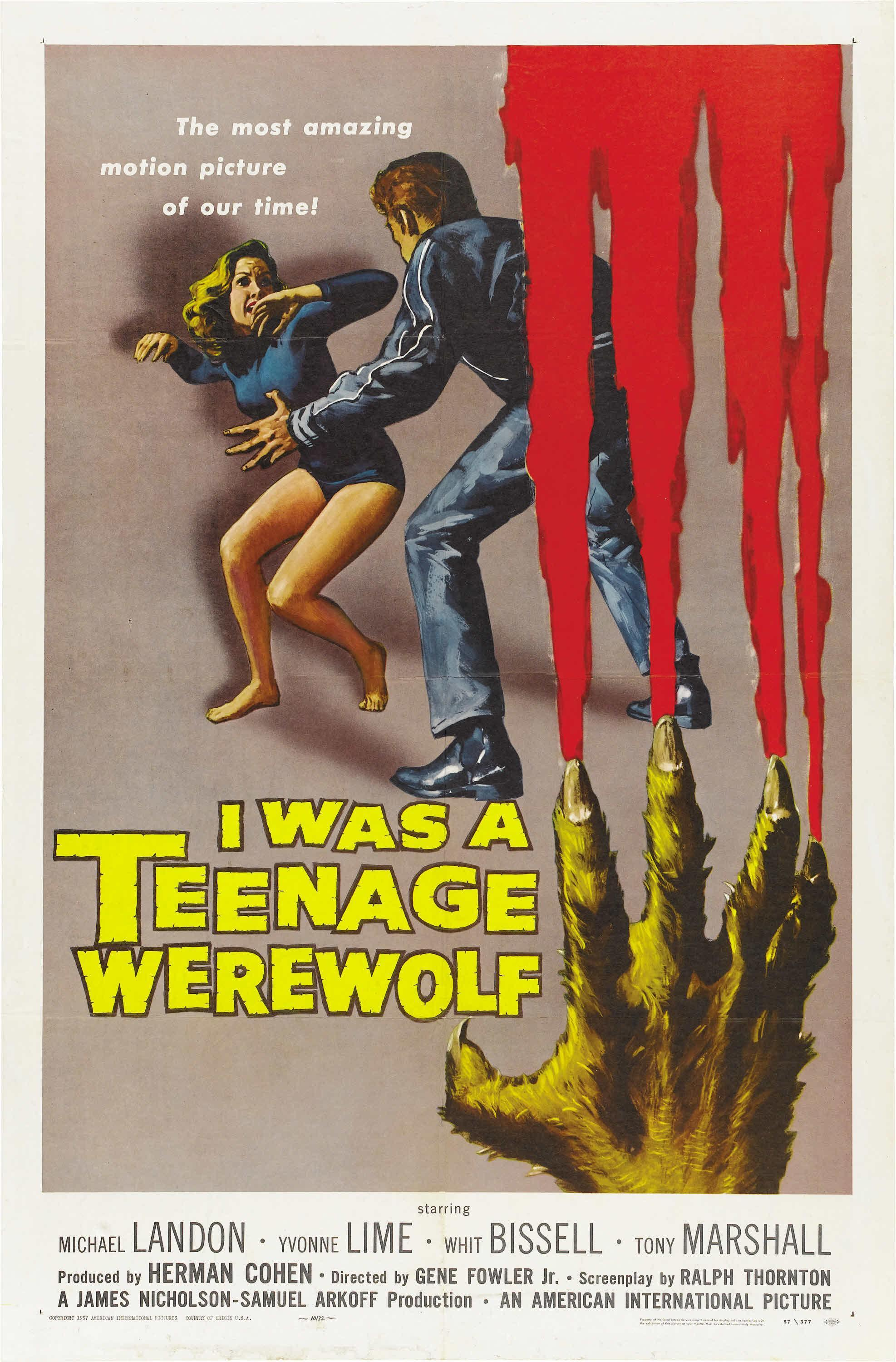
- Directed by: Gene Fowler Jr.
- Written by: Herman Cohen; Aben Kandel
- Produced by: Herman Cohen
- Starring: Michael Landon; Whit Bissell; Yvonne Lime
- Cinematography: Joseph LaShelle
- Edited by: George A. Gittens (editorial supervisor)
- Music by: Paul Dunlap
- Distributed by: American International Pictures
- Release date: June 19, 1957
- Running time: 76 minutes
- Country: United States
- Language: English
- Budget: $82,000–$123,000
- Box office: $2 million

I Was a Teenage Werewolf is a 1957 American science fiction horror film directed by Gene Fowler Jr. (in his directorial debut), and starring Michael Landon as a troubled teenager, Yvonne Lime, and Whit Bissell. Co-written and produced by cult film producer Herman Cohen, it was one of the most successful films released by American International Pictures (AIP).

The film was originally released on June 19, 1957 as a double feature with Invasion of the Saucer Men. The release included the tagline, "We DARE You to See the Most Amazing Motion Picture of Our Time!"

== Plot ==
Tony Rivers, a troubled teenager at Rockdale High, has a short temper that gets him into numerous fights. Local police Detective Donovan advises Tony to talk with a psychologist who works at the local aircraft plant, Dr. Alfred Brandon, a practitioner of hypnotherapy. Tony declines, but his girlfriend Arlene, as well as his widowed father Charles, show concern about his violent behavior. At a Halloween party at the "haunted house", an old house where teenagers hang out, Tony attacks his friend Vic after being surprised from behind. After seeing the shocked expressions on his friends' faces, he realizes he needs help and goes to see Dr. Brandon.

Brandon concludes that Tony's troubled history makes him an excellent subject for his experiments with a scopolamine serum he has developed that regresses personalities to their primitive instincts. Although Brandon's assistant, Dr. Hugo Wagner, protests that the experiment might kill Tony, Brandon injects Tony with the serum, telling him it is a sedative to prepare him for hypnosis. During a series of hypnosis sessions, Brandon draws out Tony's traumatic childhood memories and suggests to Tony that he was once a wild animal.

After a party at the haunted house, one of Tony's buddies, Frank, is attacked and killed as he walks home through the woods. Donovan and Police Chief Baker review photographs of the victim and notice that the fatal wounds look like fang marks, but there are no wild animals in the area. Pepi, the police station's janitor and a native of the Carpathian Mountains, where werewolves are common, recognizes the marks in the photos.

After another session with Brandon, during which Tony tells the doctor that he feels that something is very wrong with him, Tony reports to Miss Ferguson, the principal of Rockdale High. She tells Tony that Brandon has given him a positive report and she intends to recommend him for entry into State College. As Tony leaves the school, he passes the gymnasium where a woman, Theresa, is by herself. A school bell behind his head rings, triggering his transformation into a werewolf, and he attacks and kills Theresa. Tony flees the high school, and witnesses identify him by his clothing. Baker issues an all-points bulletin for his arrest.

In the morning, Tony reverts to his normal appearance, heads to Brandon's office, and begs for help. Brandon wants to capture Tony's transformation on film in order to prove that his procedure works and injects him with the serum again. Following the transformation, a ringing telephone triggers Tony's instincts, and he kills Brandon and Wagner, breaking open the camera in the process and ruining the film. Alerted that Tony has been seen nearby, Donovan and another officer break in and shoot several times as Tony advances toward them. When Tony dies, his normal features return, leaving Donovan to speculate on Brandon's involvement and on the mistake of people interfering in the realms of God.

== Cast ==
- Michael Landon as Tony Rivers
- Yvonne Lime as Arlene Logan
- Whit Bissell as Dr. Alfred Brandon
- Malcolm Atterbury as Charles Rivers
- Barney Phillips as Detective Sgt. Donovan
- Robert Griffin as Police Chief Baker
- Joseph Mell as Dr. Hugo Wagner
- Louise Lewis as Principal Ferguson
- Guy Williams as Officer Chris Stanley
- Tony Marshall as Jimmy
- Vladimir Sokoloff as Pepe, the janitor
- Kenny Miller as Vic
- Cindy Robbins as Pearl
- Michael Rougas as Frank
- Dawn Richard as Theresa
- S. John Launer as Mr. Bill Logan
- Dorothy Crehan as Mrs. Mary Logan

== Production ==
Samuel Z. Arkoff wrote in his memoirs that he got a lot of resistance for producing a film portraying a teenager becoming a monster, an idea that had never been exploited in film before.

Dawn Richard, who plays a teenaged gymnast in the film, was a 21-year-old Playboy centerfold model at the time, appearing in the magazine's May 1957 issue, which hit the newsstands a month ahead of the movie.

Pepe, the Romanian janitor at the police station, was played by the Russian-born Vladimir Sokoloff, a character actor who appeared as ethnic types in over 100 productions, his most famous being the old Mexican man in The Magnificent Seven three years later.

Tony Marshall is the only other male actor to receive billing in the trailer for I Was a Teenage Werewolf, in addition to Landon and Bissell; however, he made only one other motion picture, the obscure Rockabilly Baby, for Twentieth Century-Fox, which was released in October of the same year.

Shooting began 13 February 1957. The movie was shot in seven days.

This film was the first of four "teenage monster" movies produced by AIP during 1957 and 1958. All four films highlighting a theme of innocent teenagers being preyed upon, transformed, and used by corrupt adults for selfish interests. I Was a Teenage Frankenstein and Blood of Dracula were both released in November 1957 and feature a teenage boy transformed into a Frankenstein's monster and a teenage girl transformed into a werewolf-like vampire, respectively. How to Make a Monster, released in 1958, features two young actors being hypnotized to kill while in make-up as the monster characters "Teenage Werewolf" and "Teenage Frankenstein" of the 1957 films.

== Release and reception ==
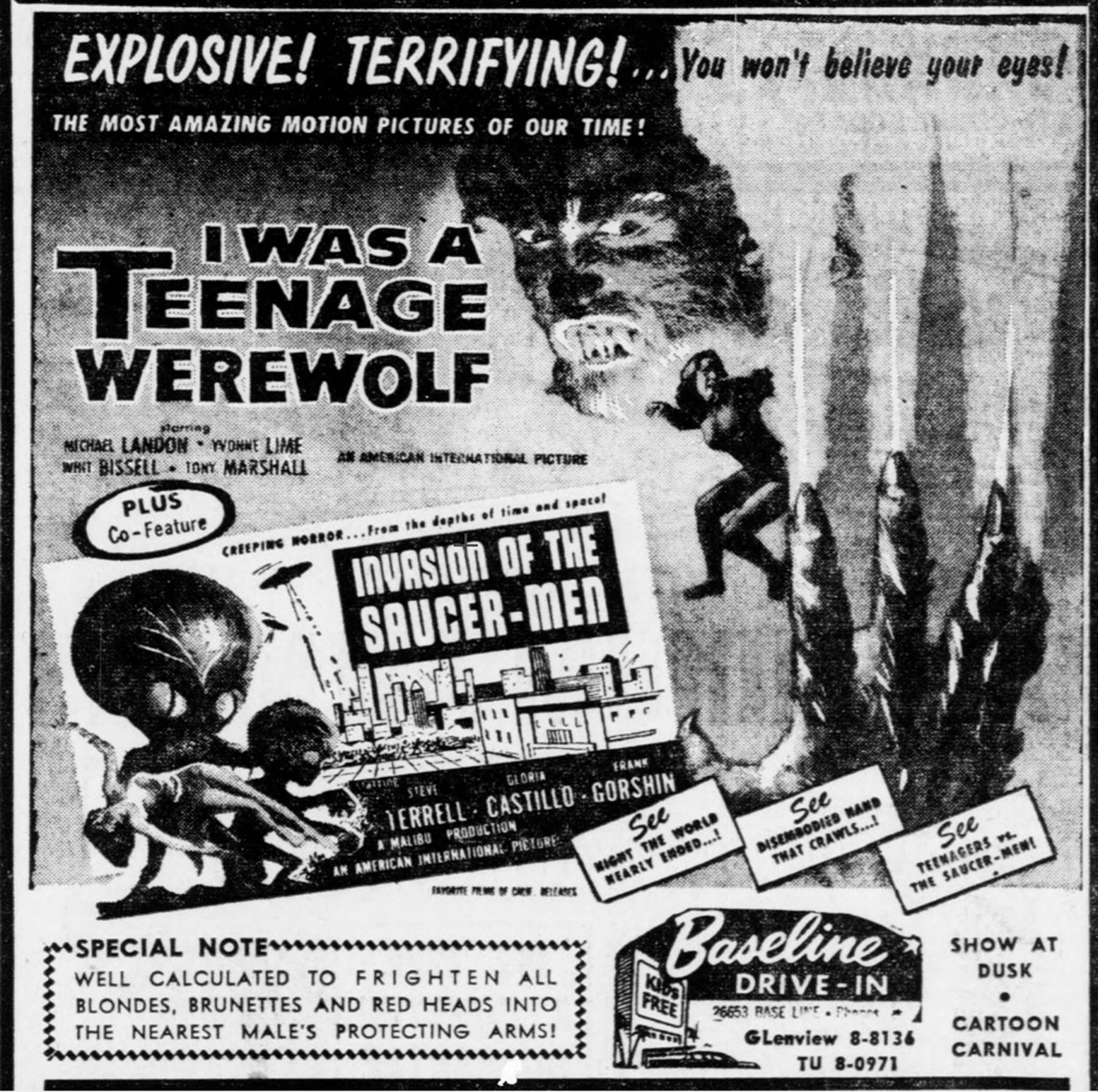
Drive-in advertisement from 1957 for I Was a Teenage Werewolf with co-feature, Invasion of the Saucer Men.

Variety reported: "Another in the cycle of regression themes is a combo teenager and science-fiction yarn which should do okay in the exploitation market [...] Only thing new about this Herman Cohen production is a psychiatrist's use of a problem teenager [...] but it's handled well enough to meet the requirements of this type film. [...] good performances help overcome deficiencies. Final reels, where the lad turns into a hairy-headed monster with drooling fangs, are inclined to be played too heavily." Variety went on to say that Landon delivers "a first-class characterization as the high school boy constantly in trouble." Harrison's Reports was fairly positive, writing, "This horror type program melodrama should give pretty good satisfaction in theatres where such films are acceptable. The story is, of course, fantastic, but it has been handled so expertly that it holds the spectator in tense suspense." The Monthly Film Bulletin in the UK was negative, declaring, "A piece of old-fashioned and second-rate horror, the transformations are very badly done, the scientific background is shaky in the extreme and the monster looks like anything but the usual idea of a werewolf. It all seems rather hard on poor Tony, who is quite a pleasant boy when he's himself."

According to Tim Dirks, the film was one of a wave of "cheap teen movies" released for the drive-in market. They consisted of "exploitative, cheap fare created especially for them [teens] in a newly-established teen/drive-in genre."

The film was very profitable, as it was made on a budget of $82,000 and grossed as much as US $2,000,000. Released in June 1957, it was followed five months later by I Was a Teenage Frankenstein and Blood of Dracula and by the sequel How to Make a Monster in July 1958.

=== AIP's female "teenage vampire" companion piece ===
Less than four months after the release of I Was a Teenage Werewolf and coinciding with the release of I Was a Teenage Frankenstein, AIP released Blood of Dracula, a film which bears more than a passing resemblance to their summer box office hit. More or less a remake, and with the hero and villain roles now both played by females, Blood of Dracula, with a story and screenplay credit by I Was a Teenage Werewolf writer Ralph Thornton (a pseudonym for AIP producer Herman Cohen and Aben Kandel), features many other similarities to I Was a Teenage Werewolf: for instance, both have (among other things) a teenager with social behavior problems, an adult mad scientist who is searching for the perfect guinea pig under the guise of helping troubled youth, an observer who can tell the killings are the work of a monster, a disbelieving police chief afraid of the press, a song written by Jerry Blaine and Paul Dunlap accompanied by a choreographed "ad-lib" dance number, hypnosis as a scientific medical treatment, drug injections, specific references to Carpathia, hairy transformation scenes and even some of the same dialogue. In addition, two prominent actors from I Was a Teenage Werewolf are also featured in Blood of Dracula, Malcolm Atterbury and Louise Lewis, with Lewis' villain, 'Miss Branding' a practically perfect female version of Whit Bissel's 'Dr. Brandon'. However, few critics have drawn a connection between the two films and while most reference works consider I Was a Teenage Frankenstein and How to Make a Monster as direct follow-ups to I Was a Teenage Werewolf, not even critic Leonard Maltin speaks of Blood of Dracula as being related to the trilogy.

== Legacy ==
After I Was a Teenage Werewolf, its star Landon became a regular on Bonanza (1959–73). Another actor from the film, Guy Williams, played Zorro in the Disney TV series Zorro (1957–59), and Professor John Robinson on the TV show Lost in Space (1965–68). In Bonanza, Williams and Landon appeared together in some episodes. Another star from the film, Whit Bissell, played Gen. Kirk on the short-run TV series The Time Tunnel.

Although today the film is largely regarded as a source of "camp" humor, and while at the time of release the idea of an adult human turning into a beast was not new, a teenager doing so in a movie was considered avant-garde—and even shocking—in 1957. I Was a Teenage Werewolf likely paved the way for Walt Disney to do his version of a Felix Salten shapeshifting novel, The Hound of Florence. Featuring Disney favorite Tommy Kirk as the hapless teenager, and A-lister Fred MacMurray as the answer to B-lister Whit Bissell, it was released in 1959 under the title The Shaggy Dog. The film betrays its successful forebear with Murray's classic bit of dialogue: "Don't be ridiculous — my son isn't any werewolf! He's just a big, baggy, stupid-looking, shaggy dog!"

=== Pop culture impact ===
The film's Police Gazette-style title (which had already been used by Hollywood previously with pictures such as 1949's I Was a Male War Bride and 1951's I Was a Communist for the FBI) with the inclusion of the adjective "teenage" was used again by AIP for their sequel I Was a Teenage Frankenstein, and the original working title for their 1958 sci-fi film Attack of the Puppet People was I Was a Teenage Doll. Due to the success of I Was a Teenage Werewolf, this convention was satirised by others, for instance, the 1959 Dobie Gillis novel I Was a Teenage Dwarf by Max Shulman.

==== Film ====
Over the years, the "I Was a Teenage..." title was played on by several unrelated films, usually comedies, wishing to make a connection with the cult AIP hit, including Teenage Caveman, the 1963 Warner Bros. cartoon I Was a Teenage Thumb, 1987's I Was a Teenage Zombie, 1992's I Was a Teenage Mummy, 1993's I Was a Teenage Serial Killer and 1999's I Was a Teenage Intellectual.

The script title for 1985's Just One of the Guys was I Was a Teenage Boy, a title that used a year later as an alternate for 1986's Willy/Milly. A working title for the 1995 hit Clueless was I Was a Teenage Teenager.

Scenes from I Was a Teenage Werewolf were included in the 1973 "fifties nostalgia" concert film Let the Good Times Roll, featuring Madison Square Garden performances from Chuck Berry and Bill Haley and the Comets.

==== Television ====
Episode 2.19 (1963) of The Dick Van Dyke Show was entitled "I Was a Teenage Head Writer".

Episode 1.18 (1967) of The Monkees was entitled "I Was a Teenage Monster".

The July 16, 1982 episode of SCTV ("Battle of the PBS Stars") featured a comedy skit of the movie called "I Was a Teenage Communist", mixing horror with the politics of red-baiting during the 1950s.

In 1987, the NBC-TV series Highway to Heaven featured "I Was a Middle-Aged Werewolf" (episode 4.5), written and directed by Michael Landon. Landon, as angel Jonathan Smith, transforms himself into a werewolf, initially to scare off some teenage bullies. During the earlier scenes, Jonathan's buddy, Mark Gordon (Victor French) watches the original film, remarking: "You know, the guy in this movie reminds me a lot of you", adding, "when he's a regular guy, not when he's got fuzz all over his face."

An episode of Nickelodeon's The Ren & Stimpy Show titled "I Was a Teenage Stimpy", showcases Stimpy going through puberty in a manner parodying the film.

In April 1997, the movie was mocked directly when it was featured in episode 809 of Mystery Science Theater 3000. The host segments, however, parody the film Alien.

The October 28, 1999 episode of SpongeBob SquarePants is titled "I Was a Teenage Gary" and features SpongeBob transforming into a snail after a hypodermic injection.

The animated series My Life as a Teenage Robot follows Jenny Wakeman, a highly advanced combat robot, as she attempts to juggle her duties as a super-heroine with normal teenage life.

A Phineas and Ferb episode in 2010 was titled "I Was a Middle-Aged Robot". It involves Ferb's dad, Lawrence Fletcher, having his memory erased, and the O.W.C.A. (Organization Without a Cool Acronym) replacing him with a robot controlled by Phineas & Ferb's pet platypus, Perry, also known as Agent P.

An episode of The Owl House in 2020 is titled "I Was a Teenage Abomination". It follows Luz as she sneaks into the local magic school and pretends to be a magical abomination to help her new friend, Willow, pass abomination class.

==== Music ====
Starting in 1975 and known as the first Horror Punk band, Sid Terror's Undead has given nods to this movie a couple times, on their self-titled first album SID TERROR'S UNDEAD (1978) with the song "I Was a Teenage Vampire" (words and music written by Sid Terror), and again with the song "Awkward" (words and music written by Sid Terror reference the I Was a Teenage Werewolf sequel, I Was a Teenage Frankenstein (1957)) as recently as 2020 on their album Pandemic Garage. John Cooper Clarke's 1978 album, Disguise in Love features the song "Teenage Werewolf", the song goes on to feature in Clarke's 2015 album Anthological. The Cramps, whose songs routinely reference horror and sci-fi films, have a song titled "I Was a Teenage Werewolf" on their 1980 album Songs the Lord Taught Us. Anarchist vegan punk band Propagandhi wrote a song titled "I Was a Pre-Teen McCarthyist" and is featured on the 1996 album Less Talk, More Rock. Rock band Queens of the Stone Age have a song on their 1998 self-titled debut album with the title, "I Was a Teenage Hand Model". Australian rock band Faker released a song in 2005 entitled "Teenage Werewolf". Punk band Against Me! released a song in 2010 titled "I Was a Teenage Anarchist". Pop punk artist Lil Cam'Ron's debut album I Was a Teenage Cameron also references the title. American Musical Theater Composer Joe Iconis wrote a song titled "I Was a Teenage Delinquent!" on YouTube. Brazilian rock band Legião Urbana has a song called "Eu Era Um Lobisomem Juvenil", title of the movie in Portuguese. Australian band Magic Dirt's 2000 song "Teenage Vampire" is a reference to the film's title.

==== Publishing ====
In Stephen King's 1986 novel It (and its made-for-TV film adaptation), several of the characters watch this movie. Afterward, Pennywise takes the form of a real teenage werewolf to frighten them, particularly Richie. When the Losers Club first attacks Pennywise, it takes the form of the teenage werewolf. In 2002, Last Gasp published I Was a Teenage Dominatrix, a memoir by Shawna Kenney. In 2015, the anthology Killer Bees from Outer Space (KnightWatch Press) featured a story, "I Was a Teenage Mummy Girl", by Amelia Mangan.

== See also ==
- Teen Wolf

== Bibliography ==
- Arkoff, Sam (1992). Flying Through Hollywood By The Seat Of My Pants: The Man Who Brought You I Was a Teenage Werewolf and Muscle Beach Party. Birch Lane Press. ISBN 1559721073.
