= Trog =

1970 British science fiction horror film by Freddie Francis

- Original theatrical release poster
- Directed by: Freddie Francis
- Screenplay by: Aben Kandel
- Story by: Peter Bryan; John Gilling
- Produced by: Herman Cohen
- Starring: Joan Crawford; Michael Gough; Bernard Kay; Joe Cornelius
- Cinematography: Desmond Dickinson
- Edited by: Oswald Hafenrichter
- Music by: John Scott
- Production company: Herman Cohen Productions
- Distributed by: Warner Bros.
- Release date: July 1970 (UK)
- Running time: 93 minutes
- Country: United Kingdom
- Language: English

Trog is a 1970 British science fiction horror film directed by Freddie Francis and starring Joan Crawford, Michael Gough and Bernard Kay. The screenplay by Aben Kandel was from a story co-written by John Gilling. The film concerns the discovery of a troglodyte (or Ice Age "caveman") in twentieth-century United Kingdom.

Trog features several cast and crew associated with Amicus Productions, however it was an independent production by expatriate American producer Herman Cohen. It was released by Warner Bros. in July 1970.

The film was a moderate commercial success but critically panned, with Freddie Francis later calling it a "terrible film" that he disowned. It has developed a reputation as a camp classic, championed by the likes of John Waters. Trog marked Crawford's last film appearance before her death in 1977.

== Plot ==
Set in contemporary Britain, the film follows Dr. Brockton, a renowned anthropologist who learns that in the caves of the countryside a lone male troglodyte is alive and might be able to be helped and even domesticated. In the interest of science and the potential groundbreaking discovery of the missing link, she gets the creature to the surface. While the rest of the townsfolk and police scatter in terror, Brockton stands steady with her tranquilizer gun and stuns the caveman into submission.

She brings him back to her lab for study, but runs into trouble as a few people oppose the presence of a "monster" in the town, especially Sam Murdock, a local businessman who is not only afraid of the negative commercial consequences but is also suspicious of a woman heading a research facility. In the meantime, the creature, given the name of "Trog", is taught by Brockton to play and share. A capacity for language is induced by a number of surgeries and a mysterious hypnotic device that causes Trog to see or relive his distant past, including clashes between various animals.

Still disturbed by Brockton's experiments, and enraged at a municipal court's decision to protect Trog, Murdock releases Trog in the middle of the night, hoping the caveman will be confronted and killed by either local residents or well-armed authorities. After being released, Trog wanders into town and kills the first three people he meets, a grocer, a butcher, and a citizen in a car, but not before he beats Murdock to death.

Trog then snatches a little girl from a playground and takes her to his cave. Dr. Brockton, the police, and army personnel soon gather at the cave's entrance. After pleading fruitlessly with the authorities to let her reason with Trog and safely retrieve the girl, Brockton suddenly acts on her own and charges down into the cave, where she finds the girl cowering in a corner. Trog initially behaves aggressively at the sight of the doctor in his refuge, but after a stern reprimand and a plea by Brockton, Trog surrenders the girl to her.

Shortly after the doctor and girl exit the cave, all of Brockton's work on behalf of science is shattered when soldiers ignite explosives before assaulting the cave. Trog is quickly wounded in a barrage of gunfire, falls, and is impaled on a stalagmite. The film ends with an on-site news reporter asking the doctor to comment on the death of the missing link; Brockton pushes aside the reporter's microphone and slowly walks away from the scene by herself.

== Cast ==
- Joan Crawford as Dr Brockton
- Michael Gough as Sam Murdock
- Bernard Kay as Inspector Greenham
- Joe Cornelius as Trog
- Kim Braden as Anne Brockton
- David Griffin as Malcolm Travers
- John Hamill as Cliff
- Thorley Walters as Magistrate
- Jack May as Dr Selbourne
- Geoffrey Case as Bill
- Simon Lack as Lt Colonel Vickers
- David Warbeck as Alan Davis
- Chloe Franks as Little girl
- Rachel Stephens as Child in park
- Maurice Good as Television reporter
- Paul Hansard as Dr Kurtlimer
- Brian Grellis as John Dennis

== Production ==
Based on an original story by Peter Bryan and John Gilling, the film was initially developed by Tony Tenser at Tigon Films, which sold the project to producer Herman Cohen. In July 1968, Cohen announced he had signed a contract with Warner Bros-Seven Arts to produce Crooks and Coronets and Trog, with the latter to begin filming in September.

Filming was delayed for several months, until after Joan Crawford agreed to star in the production in May 1969. Trog was the second of two films that she starred in for Cohen, the first being Berserk! in 1967. It also paired her again with Michael Gough, who costarred with Crawford in that earlier film. Crawford's character in the original script had been a man but Cohen rewrote it specifically for Crawford.

The director Freddie Francis later commented on the benefits and challenges that he experienced working on the film:

Trog wasn't my sort of picture. For political reasons, I'd rather not go too deeply into this. The only good thing...well, not the only good thing, but the best thing that happened on that picture was that I formed an association with Herman Cohen. He was delighted with what I did for him on Trog, even though in a case like that you know you're going to take a beating no matter what you do.

=== Filming ===
Crawford described Trog as "a low-budget picture", adding "I supply most of my own wardrobe." Just weeks after she committed to performing in the project, the film began shooting on 30 June 1969. The production also features actor David Warbeck, who has a small role as Alan Davis.

In a 1992 interview with the horror-film fan magazine Fangoria, Cohen notes that Trog, which was shot at Bray Studios and on location on the English moors, was more expensive to produce than Berserk! Cohen in that same interview also recalls the problems he had with Crawford's increased use of alcohol during filming:

Well, on Trog, her drinking was worse than it was when we were doing Berserk. I had to reprimand her a few times for drinking without asking. She had a huge frosted glass that said Pepsi-Cola—but inside was 100-proof vodka! In fact, when she arrived to do Berserk as well as Trog, she arrived with four cases of 100-proof vodka, 'cause you can't get it in England.

The stop-motion dinosaur sequence in the film is stock footage originally produced by special-effects artists Willis O'Brien and Ray Harryhausen and used in the 1956 Warner Bros. nature documentary The Animal World. Also, according to Turner Classic Movies, the "ratty ape-suit" used to create Trog's caveman appearance was a "leftover monkey outfit" from Stanley Kubrick's epic 1968 film 2001: A Space Odyssey.

Freddie Francis later referred to Trog as "a terrible film" and as one he regretted directing:

I did it because of Joan Crawford, and poor Joan by this time was a very sad old lady. We had to have idiot cards all over the place because she couldn't remember her lines. It was the last thing she ever did and she shouldn’t have done it. Neither should I ... She had no friends, and she kept writing sad letters to my wife and I [sic] until she died.

Joe Cornelius, who plays the feature's title character, provides a quite different perspective on Crawford's actions and demeanour during filming. As a professional wrestler in England, Cornelius performed in the ring for 20 years as "The Dazzler" and was chosen to portray Trog due to his physique and athletic abilities.

Cornelius's role provided him with numerous opportunities to observe Crawford both on and off camera. Forty-five years after the film's release, in an interview arranged and video-recorded by the British Film Institute (BFI), he shared publicly for the first time his experiences working on the production and more specifically with the veteran actress. That interview occurred in September 2015, just prior to a screening of Trog by BFI in one of its film retrospectives. It was conducted by the American director and writer John Waters, a notable promoter and creator of underground or "transgressive cult films", as well as a fan of many other types of low-budget, more mainstream productions like Trog.

In his interview with Waters, Cornelius takes exception to reports that Crawford used "idiot cards" and was periodically drunk during filming. The former wrestler says he saw no use of such cards by her, and he described Crawford as "great" to work with, consistently on time and "lovely" on the set, as generous in giving gifts to the crew, and how for years after completing Trog she sent him a personal card every Christmas. While he concedes that Crawford "possibly" had vodka in her Pepsi-Cola container, he stated that he never saw her drunk or unable to perform for any reason during the film's production.

== Release ==
Trog was released in Boston, Massachusetts on 16 September 1970. It premiered in the United Kingdom the following year, on 18 June 1971.

=== Home media ===
Warner Bros. Home Entertainment began marketing VHS copies of Trog in 1995 and in DVD format in 2007. The film was released on DVD by the Warner Archive Collection on 10 November 2011.

Scream Factory released the film on Blu-ray on 7 December 2021.

== Reception ==
=== Box office ===
The film was released as a double-bill with Christopher Lee's Taste the Blood of Dracula and after its first week in release, Variety on November 4, 1970, ranked the double-feature as the #1 top-grossing film(s) of the week, raking in $300,000.

=== Critical response ===
The Monthly Film Bulletin wrote: "Aben Kandel's script has played down the horror to concentrate on the dramatic possibilities of the monster's humanisation. The result is a kind of horror-comic L'Enfant Sauvage, with Joan Crawford's lady anthropologist patiently initiating her uncouth pupil in the ways of classical music (it doesn't like jazz), clockwork toys, and finally human speech. Although credulity is tested by the fact that Trog never looks like anything but a beefy stunt man with make-up ... the makers have taken pains to win us round by presenting all the newsmen as nasty sceptics whose agnostic mutterings ("Surely, doctor, this is all too simple") wilt before Joan Crawford's radiant cry of "Anthropology supports me". ... It's a disappointingly lightweight addition to the horror films of Freddie Francis."

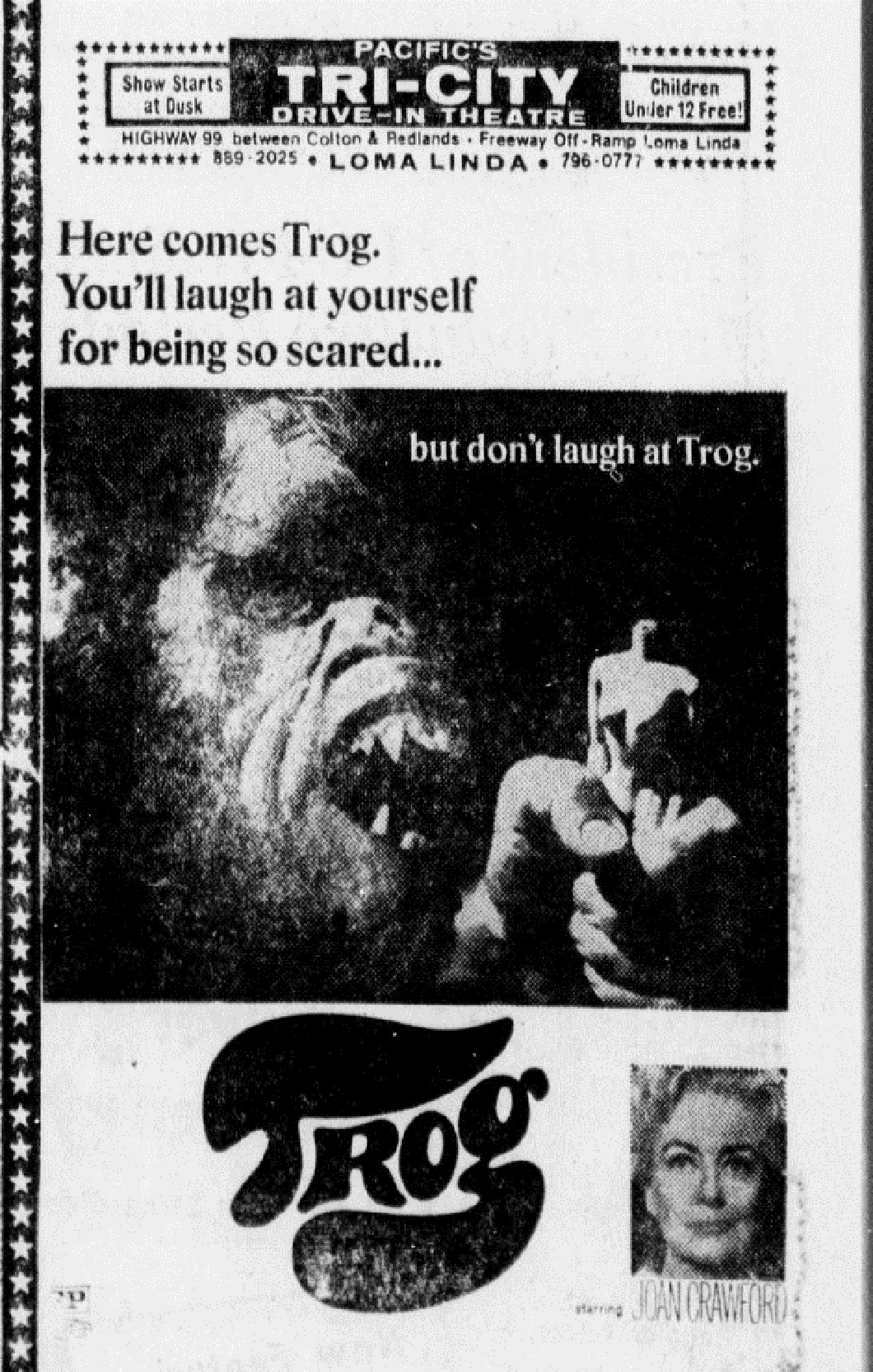
A drive-in advertisement from Loma Linda, California, 1970

Recalling his work on the film in 1992, Cohen noted that the film was completed on time, came in under budget, and was in his opinion "very successful". Many 1970 reviews of the film, however, were not favorable. In September that year, after previewing Trog, critic Roger Ebert begins his assessment of the film with a question:

Now what can you really say about a movie where Joan Crawford, dressed in an immaculate beige pantsuit, hunts through a cave shouting: "Trog! Here, Trog!" to her pet troglodyte? A scene like that surpasses absurdity, and so does this movie.

In October 1970, only a few days after the film's nationwide release in the United States, The New York Times's review at least offers two faintly positive observations about Crawford's involvement in the low-budget production:

There is, however, a rudimentary virtue in "Trog" ... in that it proves that Joan Crawford is grimly working at her craft. Unfortunately, the determined lady, who is fetching in a variety of chic pants suits and dresses, has little else going for her. As the anthropologist chief of a research center that has unearthed a living, hairy, half-caveman half-ape, Ice Age "missing link," a troglodyte she cutely nicknames 'Trog' and attempts to rear as you would a backward child, she poses no threat either to Dr. Margaret Mead or Dr. Spock.

== Legacy ==
In the decades since its premiere, Trog has achieved a near cult status among some movie fans, especially those who enjoy watching low-budget horror and sci-fi productions for their outlandish plots or for their sheer campiness, that a particular film is "'so bad it's good'". The British Film Institute in the promotion of its 2015 retrospective program on Trog provided attendees with an updated or more current take on the film's appeal:

One of the most ludicrous, touching, mind-boggling star vehicles ever. Joan Crawford, desperate for a job, teams up with director Freddie Francis(!) and an actor in a pitiful monkey mask for a sci-fi howler like no other.

Warner Bros., the film's distributor in 1970, also chose "mind-boggling" to describe Trog during the company's "31 Days of Horror" promotion to sell copies of it in October 2015. In part of that promotion leading up to Halloween, Warner Bros. assures "campy cult fans" they will "delight" in the film and that both the troglodyte's makeup and "Crawford's boldly colored pantsuits" are "hilariously bad".

The film is listed in Golden Raspberry Award founder John Wilson's 2005 book The Official Razzie Movie Guide as one of "The 100 Most Enjoyably Bad Movies Ever Made". In 2012, several years before his previously described BFI interview with Joe Cornelius, John Waters recognized Trog as one of his favorite films on the streaming service MUBI.
