= Robert Gordon (director, born 1913) =

American film director

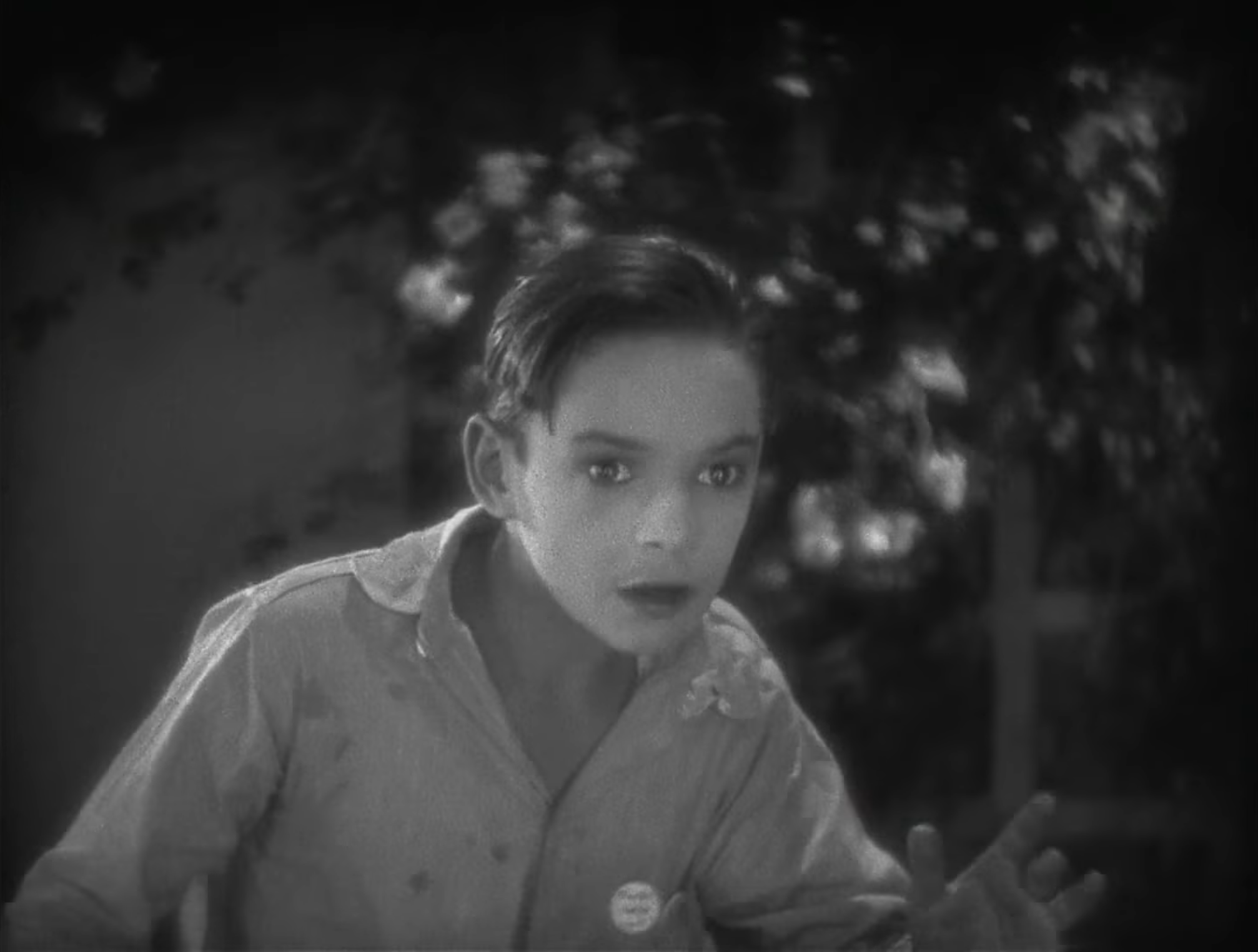
- Gordon in 1927
- Born: August 21, 1913; Pittsburgh, Pennsylvania, U.S.
- Died: December 1, 1990 (aged 77); Los Angeles, California, U.S.
- Occupations: Director, actor

Robert Gordon (August 21, 1913 – December 1, 1990) was an American director and actor. His acting career, in which he was usually credited as Bobby Gordon, began in 1923 while he was a child, and continued through 1939. His first directing credit came with the 1947 film Blind Spot, after which he directed several films, including The Joe Louis Story in 1953, It Came from Beneath the Sea in 1955, Black Zoo in 1963; and television series episodes including My Friend Flicka, Zane Grey Theater, The Texan, Bonanza, and The Many Loves of Dobie Gillis. Except for Myrna Loy, who died in 1993, he was the last surviving cast member of The Jazz Singer. Gordon directed one film under the pseudonym Robert Edwards, Thunder in the Pines, in 1948.

Robert Gordon died in 1990 and is interred at Eden Memorial Park Cemetery in Los Angeles.

== Selected filmography ==
- The Jazz Singer (1927) – Jakie Rabinowitz (age 13) (as Bobby Gordon)
- Sport of Kings (1947)

== Bibliography ==
- Holmstrom, John. The Moving Picture Boy: An International Encyclopaedia from 1895 to 1995, Norwich, Michael Russell, 1996, pp. 58–59.
