= Anita Graham =

British actress

- Born: 15 February 1948 (age 78)
- Occupation: Actress

Anita Graham (born 15 February 1948) is a British film, stage and television actress and a former member of the Royal Shakespeare Company.

== Career ==
Graham's first television role was in an episode of Crossroads (1964). She went on to appear in The New Avengers (1976), The Benny Hill Show (1977), Within These Walls (1978), in four episodes of Terry and June (1979–80) as Tina Pillbeam, Tom, Dick and Harriet (1982), Let There Be Love (1983), The Morecambe & Wise Show (1983), six episodes of Keep It in the Family (1982-3), Full House (1985), Dempsey and Makepeace (1986), as Bollitt in the Delta and the Bannermen episodes of Doctor Who (1987), Zelda in four episodes of Moon and Son (1992), EastEnders (1996), Last of the Summer Wine (2001), and Horne & Corden (2009).

Film appearances include Don't Just Lie There, Say Something! (1974), Confessions of a Window Cleaner (1974), and Who Is Killing the Great Chefs of Europe? (1978).

For the Royal Shakespeare Company she appeared in Piaf and Once in a Lifetime, both in 1980 at the Piccadilly Theatre. In 1983 she appeared in Look, No Hans at the Yvonne Arnaud Theatre, and The Mating Game at the Theatre Royal in Windsor. She appeared again in Look, No Hans at the Strand Theatre (1985-6), and in Run For Your Wife (1987) at the Criterion Theatre, acting again in the latter play at the Duchess Theatre from 1990-91.

In 1990 she acted in Kathy Burke's play Mr Thomas at the Old Red Lion Theatre. It was subsequently filmed and shown on Channel 4. Graham acted in Funny Money at the Playhouse Theatre (1996), and in The Norman Conquests for Ian Dickens (2007). In 2012 she appeared in Michael Cooney's Cash on Delivery at The Mill at Sonning. In October 2023, she appeared in an episode of the BBC soap opera Doctors as Betty Powell.

== Filmography ==
=== Film ===
Year	Title	Role	Notes
1974	Don't Just Lie There, Say Something!	Wendy	
1974	Confessions of a Window Cleaner	Ingrid	
1978	Who Is Killing the Great Chefs of Europe?	Blonde	
2008	Hunted	Lorraine	
2012	Run for Your Wife	Aerobics Teacher	
2019	Out of the Blue	Christine	
2021	Jagame Thandhiram	Sofia	
2023	Old Times	Marge	

=== Television ===
Year	Title	Role	Notes
1971	Mr Tumbleweed	Greek Goddess	TV film
1976	The New Avengers	Helga	Episode: "To Catch a Rat"
1977	The Benny Hill Show	Girl Scout Guide	Episode: "Show 30"
1977	The Cedar Tree	Ivy	Episode: "The Woman I Love: Part 2"
1978	Within These Walls	Karen Riley	Episode: "Mixer"
1979–1980	Terry and June	Tina Pillbeam	4 episodes
1982	Tom, Dick and Harriet	Babs	Episode: "On the Town"
1982–1983	Keep It in the Family	Wilma	6 episodes
1983	Let There Be Love	Miss Crompton	Episode: "If the Nightie Fits"
1983	The Morecambe & Wise Show	Various	Episode: #4.4
1985	Full House	Shirley Wilcox	Episode: "It's a Steal"
1986	Dempsey and Makepeace	Blossom	Episode: "The Burning"
1987	Doctor Who	Bollitt	Episode: "Delta and the Bannermen"
1990	Mr Thomas	Brenda Tebbit	TV film
1992	Moon and Son	Zelda Lee	5 episodes
1996	EastEnders	Lesley Langton	2 episodes
2001	Last of the Summer Wine	Mrs. Endicott	Episode: "Hey, Big Vendor"
2003	Harry and Cosh	Mrs. Kilby	Episode: "Kung Fu Warriors"
2009	Horne & Corden	Mary	Episode: #1.5
2018	Hangman	Kath	TV film
2023	Doctors	Betty Powell	Episode: "With You"
