= Round the Horne: List of programmes =

Round the Horne is a BBC Radio comedy programme that was transmitted in four series of weekly episodes from 1965 until 1968. The show was created by Barry Took and Marty Feldman, who wrote the first three series. The fourth was written by Took, Johnnie Mortimer, Brian Cooke and Donald Webster. Round the Horne starred Kenneth Horne, with Kenneth Williams, Hugh Paddick, Betty Marsden and Bill Pertwee. The following list shows the dates of first broadcasts and some of the principal items in each programme.

== List of programmes ==
=== Series 1 ===
Series 1: 1965
1	7 March	Including: The BBC's backroom boys: the programme planners; Part one of The Clissold Saga
2	14 March	Including: Isambard Kingdom Fortinbras, inventor of the doorknob; More of the BBC backroom boys; The Clissold Saga 2: The aviator
3	21 March	Including: BBC sound effects department; The Clissold Saga 3: A pantomime horse
4	28 March	Including: Robert Capability Lackwind, inventor of toad in the hole; BBC censorship department; The Clissold Saga 4: Egyptology; Rentachap: the first appearance of Julian and Sandy
5	4 April	Including: Richard Serendipity Mountbasket, inventor of the Christmas Pudding; BBC personnel department: Gruntfuttock applies for a BBC job; The Clissold Saga 5: films; Julian and Sandy running a gents' boutique in Chelsea
6	11 April	Including: Tammany Wilkinshaft, inventor of the crumpet; BBC complaints department; Inspector Horne's casebook – The Tap-dancing Monk; Kenneth Horne visits a new bona bistro
7	18 April	Including: Nemesis Fothergill, Ornithologist; BBC audience research department; "Edwin Braden Is Missing": Horne investigates; Julian and Sandy as scriptwriters
8	25 April	Including: Edwin Chattleforth, inventor of forced meat; BBC auditioners; 'Who killed the Amazing Proudbasket?; Private Fever – Noël Coward parody; Bona Tours
9	2 May	Including: Friar Wacker Biscuit, inventor of the hip bath; The Spy Who Came in with a Cold: Kenneth Horne meets Chou en Ginsberg; Bona Bouffant
10	9 May	Including: Gruntfuttock, King of Peasmoldia; Kenneth Horne, Master Spy: Famous People Are Turning Into Animals; First appearance of Rambling Syd Rumpo
11	16 May	Including: From Russia With Love and Kind Regards to Auntie Mabel; Blithe Laughter; Bona Homes, estate agents
12	23 May	Including: Kenneth Horne, Master Spy: The Man with the Golden Thunderball; Fabe Homes and Bona Gardens
13	30 May	Including: Dictator ex-King Gruntfuttock; Kenneth Horne, Master Spy: The Missing Eiffel Tower; Lover, Come Back to Me, Romberg, Hammerstein; Present Encounter; Bona Pets
14	6 June	Including: Dictator ex-King Gruntfuttock; Special agent Kenneth Horne probes a pirate invasion of the BBC; It's a Lovely Day Today Irving Berlin; Studio Bona – Jules and Sand as photographers
15	13 June	Including: Special agent Kenneth Horne investigating a Rocket Site in Haiti; Bitter Laughter; Nice Work If You Can Get It George and Ira Gershwin; Bona Seats, ticket agency
16	20 June	Including: Kenneth Horne, Special Agent: Traffic wardens in outer space; Forbidden Encounter; This Can't Be Love, Rodgers and Hart; Bona Productions: melodramas with Julian and Sandy

=== Series 2 ===
Series 2: 1966
1	13 March	Including: Kenneth Horne, Master Spy – Big Ben is Stolen; The Seamus Android Show with Gladys Runt; Bona Drag
2	20 March	Including: Kenneth Horne, Master Spy – Big Ben is Still Missing; Bona Books
3	27 March	Including: Kenneth Horne, Master Spy – The Escaped War Criminal; Bona Tattoos; The Seamus Android Show with J. Peasmold Gruntfuttock, Zsa Zsa Poltergeist and Daryl F. Claphanger IV
4	3 April	Including: Dobbiroids, The Magic Horse Rejuvenator; Kenneth Horne, Master Spy – The World Cup Is Stolen; Julian and Sandy in MI5
5	10 April	Including: Kenneth Horne, Master Spy – The Nuclear Banana
6	17 April	Including: Kenneth Horne, Master Spy – The Joke Thief; Julian and Sandy as MI5 dance instructors; The Seamus Android Show with Barbara Cartload and Michael Baine
7	24 April	Including: Dobbiroids Theatre of the Air presents a Special Edition of Round the Horne – Dr Mckinlays Scrapbook
8	1 May	Including: Kenneth Horne Theatre of Suspense – The Giant Mouse; The End of the Pier Show at Bogmouth-on-Sylt, auditions –; The Amazing Gruntfuttock, Escapologist Extraordinaire; Desmond Grapple, Panto Dame; Dentures as The Great Omipaloni, Illusionist; Rambling Syd Rumpo** Irish Bog Wanderers Song; Sunny Molestrangler Vaf; Julian and Sandy Telepathy Act
9	8 May	Including: Kenneth Horne Theatre of Mystery and Imagination – The Curse of the Blackstumps; The Balls Pond Road Festival of the Arts – J Peasmold Gruntfuttock Describes the Events; Rambling Syd Rumpo: Fly Little Bird; The Ballet Bona
10	15 May	Including: Kenneth Horne Theatre of Suspense – The Portrait of Florian Thrust; The Hasty Nose; Bona Promotions
11	22 May	Including: Kenneth Horne Theatre of Suspense – The Gaylords; Bona Beat Songs Ltd
12	29 May	Including: Kenneth Horne Theatre of Suspense – Dr Postern and Dr Fu Manchu-en-Ginsberg; Bona Relations
13	5 June	Including: Kenneth Horne Theatre of Suspense – Moby Duck; Bona Performers

=== Series 3 ===
Series 3: 1967
1	12 February	Including: Armpit Theatre – The Plastic Max; Colour supplement – Seamus Android at Pinewood; Julian and Sandy: no parts for us?
2	19 February	Including: Armpit theatre – The Three Musketeers (I); Colour supplement – Swinging London with Brad Smallpiece; Brief Ecstasy; Bona Law
3	26 February	Including: Armpit theatre – The Three Musketeers (II); In Which We Serve; Bona Cruising
4	5 March	Including: Armpit Theatre – Lipharvest of the River; Seamus Android at London Airport; The Moon and Sixpence (reduced to fourpence for this week only); Bona Antiques
5	12 March	Including: Armpit theatre – How The Bullet Proof Vest Was Won; Bona Soulmates
6	19 March	Including: Armpit Theatre – Trilby; The Daily Polari
7	26 March	Including: Armpit theatre – The Admirable Loombucket (I); Bona Caterers
8	2 April	Including: Armpit Theatre – The Admirable Loombucket (II); Bona Nature clinic
9	9 April	Including: A Special Tribute to J Peasmold Gruntfuttock; Bona Press
10	16 April	Including: Armpit Theatre – Gaslight; Bona Prods
11	23 April	Including: Armpit Theatre – The Phantom of Bogmouth; Bona Tax Consultants
12	30 April	Including: Armpit Theatre – A Man Is Two Foot Tall; Bona Bijou Tourettes
13	7 May	Including: Armpit Theatre – Young Horne with a Man; Bona Séances
14	14 May	Including: Armpit theatre – The Maltese Brass Monkey; Bona Hunt
15	21 May	Including: Armpit Theatre – The Big Top; Bona Gourmet
16	28 May	Including: Armpit Theatre – The Muffplaster Saga; Bona Guided Tripettes
17	4 June	Including: The Muffplaster Saga – The Boxer; Bona Guest House
18	11 June	Including: The Muffplaster Saga – The Bullfighter; Bona TV
19	18 June	Including: The Palone Ranger; The BBC: J Peasmold Gruntfuttock the scriptwriter; Charles and Fiona in the sound effects department; Rambling Syd Rumpo, Green Grows My Bogling Fork; Julian and Sandy: wardrobe department
20	25 June	Including: The Head of the BBC Who Came In From The Cold; Gruntfuttock goes bodybuilding; The Body Bona

=== Series 4 ===
Series 4: 1968
1	25 February	Including: Movie Go Wrong – Dr Doosweet BA; The Lazy Bona Ranch
2	3 March	Including: Movie Go Wrong – Thoroughly Modern Willy; Bona Gurumat
3	10 March	Including: Movie Go Wrong – Frankenstein's Monster; Bona Indoor Ski School
4	17 March	Including: Movie Go Wrong – The Knights Of Camelot; Bona Rags
5	24 March	Including: Movie Go Wrong – Relatively Grand Prix; Bona Male Model Agency
6	31 March	Including: Movie Go Wrong – Big Broads Don't Squeal; Bona Gift Boutique
7	7 April	Including: Movie Go Wrong – The Celluloid Jungle; Bona Academy of Ballroom Dancing
8	14 April	Including: Movie Go Wrong – Around The World in Ten Minutes; Bona Songs
9	21 April	Including: Movie Go Wrong – Journey to Uranus; Bona Books
10	28 April	Including: Movie Go Wrong – Apache Story; Keep Britain Bona
11	5 May	Including: Movie Go Wrong – Escape From Stalag Limpwrist; Bona Abbey
12	12 May	Including: Movie Go Wrong – I Showed Them In Fleet Street; Bona Private Detective Agency
13	19 May	Including: Movie Go Wrong – Continuum Medicum Romanum; Bona Language School
14	26 May	Including: Movie Go Wrong – Beau; Julian and Sandy: Efficiency Experts
15	2 June	Including: Movie Go Wrong – Bona Prince Charlie; Bona Ads
16	9 June	Including: Movie Go Wrong – He, Son of She; Julian and Sandy: Julian's birthday

Source: BBC Radio 7.

=== Christmas specials ===
==== Broadcast 25 December 1966 ====
- What's on in Swinging London, with Peter Nodule
- Daphne Whitethigh's gossip column
- Horse of the Year Show
- Brad Smallpiece with current events
- The Colour Supplement – The Lively Arts
- Rambling Syd Rumpo: "The Clacton Bogle Picker's Lament"
- Christmas at the BBC, exchanging presents (Charles and Fiona, Julian and Sandy)
- The Fraser Hayes Four – It Happened In Sun Valley
- Armpit Theatre – The Hunchback of Notre Dame

(Kenneth Horne was unwell and did not take part in this programme.)

==== Broadcast 24 December 1967 ====
- The Critics
- Events this Christmas
- Christmas Message
- Armpit Theatre – Cinderella
- Christmas Party – Daphne Whitethigh makes the punch – Madam Osiris predicts – Charles without Fiona
- Rambling Syd Rumpo: "Good King Boroslav"
- Julian and Sandy as cloakroom attendants and entertainers.

== Notes and sources ==
=== Sources ===
- Took, Barry (1998). Round the Horne: The Complete and Utter History. London: Boxtree. ISBN 978-0-7522-2119-9.
