= Greg Freeman =

Greg Freeman may refer to:

- Greg Freeman (playwright), English playwright and television writer
- Greg Freeman (musician), American country musician
- Greg Freeman (American football), American footballer
