= List of Robin's Nest episodes =

Robin's Nest is a British sitcom made by Thames Television, which aired on the ITV network for 48 episodes over six series from 11 January 1977 to 31 March 1981. It saw Richard O'Sullivan reprise the role of Robin Tripp, one of the lead characters in the sitcom Man About the House. It also starred Tessa Wyatt, Tony Britton and David Kelly.

== Series overview ==
Series	Episodes	Originally released	
Series	Episodes	First released	Last released
1	7	11 January 1977	22 February 1977
2	6	23 February 1978	30 March 1978
3	13	25 September 1978	18 December 1978
4	7	22 February 1979	5 April 1979
5	7	27 December 1979	12 February 1980
6	8	24 December 1980	31 March 1981

== Episodes ==
=== Series 1 (1977) ===
No. overall	No. in series	Title	Produced & Directed by	Written by	Original release date
1	1	"Sleeping Partners"	Peter Frazer-Jones	Johnnie Mortimer & Brian Cooke	11 January 1977
Robin and Vicky discover the Chinese restaurant they live above has closed down owing Vicky's father James 3 month's rent. Robin, who is a trained chef hits on the idea of possibly convincing James to lend him the money to start a bistro 'Robins Nest' James refuses but presents an even more intriguing solution for Robin and Vicky.
2	2	"The Bistro Kids"	Peter Frazer-Jones	Johnnie Mortimer & Brian Cooke	18 January 1977
The day of the restaurant opening arrives and Robin and Vicky are frantic with all the things they need to remember to organize a successful opening. James continues to put pressure on the couple over the day to day functions of the restaurant as well as the status of their relationship.
3	3	"A Little Competition"	Peter Frazer-Jones	Johnnie Mortimer & Brian Cooke	25 January 1977
Robin feels threatened when an old flame of Vicky's begins to make plans for a steak house next door to their restaurant. To make matters worse they are all invited to the grand opening which they finally do decide to attend. Robin has had enough of his rival fawning over Vicky and decides to exact revenge.
4	4	"The Maternal Triangle"	Peter Frazer-Jones	Johnnie Mortimer & Brian Cooke	1 February 1977
Robin becomes concerned when Victoria's mother comes to town and wants to meet Robin. The Bistro also becomes the focus of an inspection from the fire department when there are concerns about the sprinkler system. Victoria also expressed concern over the new dish washer Robin employed. First appearance of Albert (David Kelly).
5	5	"Piggy in the Middle"	Peter Frazer-Jones	Johnnie Mortimer & Brian Cooke	8 February 1977
Robin wonders how he can get rid of Albert after a number of breakages, Mr. Nicholls suggests using the Bistro as an art gallery to brighten it up, and Vicky's not happy when her father starts seeing a younger woman.
6	6	"A Matter of None"	Peter Frazer-Jones	Johnnie Mortimer & Brian Cooke	15 February 1977
Albert insists on returning to work despite being sacked the day before, the CID visit the Bistro to investigate a £10 note paid in at the bank, and Mr. Nicholls is forced to order unwanted courgettes at the police station.
7	7	"Oh Happy Day"	Peter Frazer-Jones	Johnnie Mortimer & Brian Cooke	22 February 1977
Robin gets a shock when Vicky changes her mind about getting married, Albert lets slip about the honeymoon after being sworn to secrecy, and Mr. Nicholls is disappointed when he learns that he won't even be there.

=== Series 2 (1978) ===
No. overall	No. in series	Title	Produced & Directed by	Written by	Original release date
8	1	"As Long as He Needs Me"	Peter Frazer-Jones	Johnnie Mortimer & Brian Cooke	23 February 1978
Victoria's father puts his back out at the restaurant and is taken home by her and Robin. He isn't as injured as he makes out but likes having his daughter home again to wait on him.
9	2	"The Seven Pound Fiddle"	Peter Frazer-Jones	Johnnie Mortimer & Brian Cooke	2 March 1978
Mr. Nicholls quickly accuses Albert when money is found to be missing, DS Burke returns to the bistro after finding a poster on his windscreen, and talk of being sued leads to a desperate search for an innocent man.
10	3	"Ups & Downs"	Peter Frazer-Jones	Johnnie Mortimer & Brian Cooke	9 March 1978
Robin searches for the trapdoor to a cellar he's found on council plans, Vicky decides to buy a new dress when her father gets tickets for a show, and a badly timed delivery means that she might have to go on her own.
11	4	"Three Times Table"	Peter Frazer-Jones	Johnnie Mortimer & Brian Cooke	16 March 1978
Robin decides to put some tables outside to give the diners more choice, the steakhouse try to poach a customer sat on an overhanging chair, and Mr. Nicholls suggests new locations after receiving an offer for the bistro.
12	5	"Great Expectations"	Peter Frazer-Jones	Johnnie Mortimer & Brian Cooke	23 March 1978
Robin's not too happy when a fruit machine is wheeled into the bistro, talk of possible pregnancy puts marriage firmly back on the agenda, and Mr. Nicholls gets stuck into making decisions about his future grandson.
13	6	"Love & Marriage"	Peter Frazer-Jones	Johnnie Mortimer & Brian Cooke	30 March 1978
Albert asks if there is any chance that he could be invited to the wedding, Robin's disappointed when a new freezer turns out to be tickets to Paris, and a last minute change of plan leads to concerns about leather seats.

=== Series 3 (1978) ===
No. overall	No. in series	Title	Produced & Directed by	Written by	Original release date
14	1	"You Need Hands"	Peter Frazer-Jones	Bernard Mckenna	25 September 1978
Robin learns that a gourmet evening has been arranged in his absence, Mr. Nicholls helps a piano forte player by giving him somewhere to play, and a jammed waste disposal unit ends up putting the chef out of action.
15	2	"The Candidate"	Peter Frazer-Jones	David Norton & Roger Taylor	2 October 1978
A council official arrives with a court order because of unpaid rates, Mr. Nicholls stands for election after winning the support of local businesses, and a slice of Dublin pie forces Robin to take part in a radio debate show.
16	3	"Just Desserts"	Peter Frazer-Jones	Bernard Mckenna	9 October 1978
Mr. Nicholls manages to persuade two pretty girls to dine in the bistro, Vicky jumps to the wrong conclusion about an exchange of numbers, and Robin needs a bed for the night after getting stuck to another woman.
17	4	"Away From All What?"	Peter Frazer-Jones	Charlotte Bingham & Terence Brady	16 October 1978
The Tripps are invited to stay at a Cornish hotel owned by their friends, Mr. Nicholls points out that customers have already made reservations, and Vicky's idea to fake illness delivers very little in the way of sympathy.
18	5	"England Expects"	Peter Frazer-Jones	David Norton & Roger Taylor	23 October 1978
Robin wakes up his father-in-law with news of a possible parking ticket, Mr. Nicholls insists on hosting a big regimental dinner at the bistro, and Albert panics when he finds himself face-to-face with his old sergeant.
19	6	"Once Two is Three"	Peter Frazer-Jones	Jon Watkins	30 October 1978
Robin and Vicky are offered the chance to open a restaurant in Brighton, Mr. Nicholls refuses to stump up £600 for repairs and redecoration, and Albert expresses utter amazement at a demonstration of psychic ability.
20	7	"Dinner Date"	Peter Frazer-Jones	Terence Feely	6 November 1978
Mr. Nicholls seeks his daughter's approval ahead of a marriage proposal, Vicky refuses to meet his girlfriend when she remembers who she is, and Robin offers to cook dinner at the bistro in an effort to help things along.
21	8	"Everything You Wish Yourself"	Peter Frazer-Jones	Willis Hall	13 November 1978
Mr. Nicholls investigates the very delicate matter of his daughter's size, Robin panics when he's told that he's forgotten his wife's birthday, and Albert's told not to move a muscle when he'e left in charge of the bistro.
22	9	"Be It Ever So Humble"	Peter Frazer-Jones	Ken Hoare	20 November 1978
Robin complains about never being able to get a picture on his television, Albert's resignation is accepted after he's found acting suspiciously, and Vicky insists on helping the homeless by making up a bed in the bistro.
23	10	"Day Trippers"	Peter Frazer-Jones	Bernard Mckenna	27 November 1978
Vicky and Robin decide to take the day off so they can go out for a picnic, Mr. Nicholls explains why he's the only one allowed to drive his car, and Albert tries to hitch a lift after insisting on being paid for the whole day.
24	11	"The Long Distance Runner"	Peter Frazer-Jones	Jon Watkins	4 December 1978
Albert reveals that he has been feeding a friendly mouse in the kitchen, Mr. Nicholls isn't happy when he learns that the bistro is losing money, and Robin takes a secret job to raise money for an anniversary present.
25	12	"At Harm’s Length"	Peter Frazer-Jones	Charlotte Bingham & Terence Brady	11 December 1978
Mr. Nicholls isn't happy about a special senior citizens anniversary price, Vicky insists on making an exception for the woman who brought her up, and Albert's told to move a returning customer to a less suitable table.
26	13	"The Happy Hen"	Peter Frazer-Jones	Dave Freeman	18 December 1978
Mr. Nicholls announces that he's opening an omelette house next door, Robin discovers that staff interviews are taking place in the bistro, and an unexpected knock-through leaves the customers with a funny taste.

=== Series 4 (1979) ===
No. overall	No. in series	Title	Produced & Directed by	Written by	Original release date
27	1	"Should Auld Acquaintance"	Peter Frazer-Jones	Dave Freeman	22 February 1979
Mr. Nicholls announces that a restaurant critic will be visiting the bistro, a non-paying customer turns out to be an old catering college friend, and Vicky suggests using her father's flat to escape from an unwanted guest.
28	2	"Person Friday Required"	Peter Frazer-Jones	Adele Rose	1 March 1979
Robin's tested after refusing to accept that he takes his wife for granted, Vicky demands to be allowed to go back to her old job at the airport, and Mr. Nicholls gets straight on with the task of finding a sexy replacement.
29	3	"Lost Weekend"	Peter Frazer-Jones	Adele Rose	8 March 1979
Albert curses his Irish luck when he wins a holiday for two in the Algarve, a dispute over who the tickets belong to sees two turn quickly into three, and shock awaits in Portugal when their hotel reservations are cancelled.
30	4	"Too Many Waiters Spoil the Bistro"	Peter Frazer-Jones	Bernard Mckenna	15 March 1979
The addition of new tables in the bistro brings a search for a new waiter, differing opinions see more than one person offered the same job, and a vicar arrives in search of a venue for the annual St. Ignatius Club Dinner. A mistake is left in the recorded episode when Richard catches Tessa on the throat with the table leg.
31	5	"September Song"	Peter Frazer-Jones	George Layton	22 March 1979
Albert ends up with his arm in a sling after filling in his football coupon, Mr. Nicholls reacts badly when he finds himself locked out of the bistro, and Vicky asks Robin to talk to her father about his sudden depression.
32	6	"Sorry Partner"	Peter Frazer-Jones	David Norton & Roger Taylor	29 March 1979
Albert's accused of trying to make off with a box of valuable possessions, a betrayal leaves Mr. Nicholls looking for a new badminton partner, and Vicky tries to persuade Robin to demonstrate his own shuttlecock skills.
33	7	"Albert’s Ball"	Peter Frazer-Jones	Richard Waring & Gail Renard	5 April 1979
Albert tries to remind his employers about the significance of the date, Mr. Nicholls takes action when an old friend is injured in the bistro, and the Tripps find themselves catering to every whim to avoid being sued.

=== Series 5 (1979–80) ===
No. overall	No. in series	Title	Produced & Directed by	Written by	Original release date
34	1	"Christmas at Robin’s Nest"	Peter Frazer-Jones	George Layton	27 December 1979
Robin tires of constant singing as he attempts to put up the decorations, Mr. Nicholls is told that the bistro will stay closed on Christmas Day, and Albert hands in his resignation after receiving an unexpected windfall.
35	2	"Pastures New"	Peter Frazer-Jones	George Layton	8 January 1980
Rob starts to question whether there's more to life than running a bistro, Albert calls to announce that he's opened a nest of his own in Watford, and Mr. Nicholls fails to spot Gertrude's interest in the washer-upper job.
36	3	"A Man of Property"	Peter Frazer-Jones	George Layton	15 January 1980
Robin gets a shock when Vicky waddles in with an enormous baby bump, Albert reverses the charges to ask Gertrude about his new toaster, and a search for a new family home leads to the office of a snake in the grass. Robin's Nest writer George Layton appears as Vernon Potter. There's also an allusion to Richard O'Sullivan's previous series Man About The House when Robin mentions a former flatmate who Vernon dated. This may have been Jo (Sally Thomsett) as his other flatmate Chrissy (Paula Wilcox) was in a relationship with Robin's brother Norman at the end of the series.
37	4	"If You Pass ‘Go’ Collect £200"	Peter Frazer-Jones	George Layton	22 January 1980
Robin tires of having to ask for permission before buying essential items, Mr. Nicholls laughs at the idea of being bought out by his son-in-law, and Vicky's furious when she finds a snack bar parked outside of the bistro.
38	5	"Never Look a Gift Horse…"	Peter Frazer-Jones	Adele Rose	29 January 1980
Albert returns to his old job when the wheels fall off of his own business, Vicky's puzzled when a delivery man arrives with an expensive pram, and Mr. Nicholls isn't happy when his ex-wife starts telling him what to do.
39	6	"Just an Old-Fashioned Girl"	Peter Frazer-Jones	Adele Rose	5 February 1980
Mr. Nicholls announces that the new woman in his life is an estate agent, Gertrude hands in her notice to avoid working for a man living in sin, and Vicky persuades Robin to talk to Albert about popping the big question.
40	7	"Great Expectations"	Peter Frazer-Jones	George Layton	12 February 1980
Robin has nightmares after he's told that he should be there at the birth, Vicky learns that bets are being taken on the sex and weight of her baby, and Mr. Nicholls protests about having to wait on Albert and Gertrude.

=== Series 6 (1980–81) ===
No. overall	No. in series	Title	Produced & Directed by	Written by	Original release date
41	1	"No Room at the Inn"	Peter Frazer-Jones	Johnnie Mortimer & Brian Cooke	24 December 1980
Vicky has to spend Christmas in hospital after giving birth to the twins, Marion arrives to see her grandchildren after a huge row with Pedro, and Mr. Nicholls spends some time with his ex-wife after an accidental invite.
42	2	"Move Over Darling"	Peter Frazer-Jones	George Layton	17 February 1981
Gertrude cooks Robin a decent meal to stop him eat cold baked beans, Mr. Nicholls protests at the idea of the bistro serving English fayre, and Vicky learns that a mother on the ward has taken a shine to her father.
43	3	"The Homecoming"	Peter Frazer-Jones	George Layton	24 February 1981
Albert's told that he should stick to speaking English when taking orders, Mr. Nicholls objects to the idea of his grandchildren going home in a van, and Robin grows tired of being constantly outdone by his father-in-law.
44	4	"No Smoke Without Fire"	Peter Frazer-Jones	George Layton	3 March 1981
Vicky's delighted when Robin shows her what's at the top of his ladder, Mr. Nicholls learns that he's been accused of carrying on with Gertrude, and Albert struggles to raise the alarm when he gets trapped in the loft.
45	5	"When Irish Eyes Are Smiling"	Peter Frazer-Jones	George Layton	10 March 1981
Albert comes to the rescue when the twins are woken by their Grandad, a burst water main makes a sleepless night even more unbearable, and Vicky suggests spending the week with her father to escape the noise.
46	6	"Anniversary Waltz"	Peter Frazer-Jones	George Layton	17 March 1981
Mr. Nicholls finds a few problems when he checks the bistro's expenses, Vicky tells Robin that a booking clashes with their wedding anniversary, and the arrival of a coach party brings a need for an alternative menu.
47	7	"Wish You Weren’t Here"	Peter Frazer-Jones	George Layton	24 March 1981
Robin struggles to get to grips with the complex art of changing a nappy, Mr. Nicholls shocks his son-in-law with a weeks' holiday in Tenerife, and a temporary chef sent by an agency turns out to be totally unsuitable.
48	8	"The Headhunters of S.W.6."	Peter Frazer-Jones	George Layton	31 March 1981
Albert's given advice about the only proper way to serve a bottle of wine, Robin's offered a job with an international company that he can't refuse, and Mr. Nicholls insists that he's got people queuing up to buy the bistro.
