= Robin's Nest (TV series) =

British TV sitcom (1977–1981)

- Series 1 opening title
- Genre: Sitcom
- Created by: Brian Cooke; Johnnie Mortimer
- Based on: Man About the House by: Johnnie Mortimer; Brian Cooke
- Starring: Richard O'Sullivan; Tony Britton; Tessa Wyatt; David Kelly
- Country of origin: United Kingdom
- Original language: English
- No. of series: 6
- No. of episodes: 48 (list of episodes)

Production
- Producer: Peter Frazer-Jones
- Running time: 30 minutes (including commercials)
- Production company: Thames Television

Original release
- Network: ITV
- Release: 11 January 1977 – 31 March 1981

Related
- Man About the House; Three's a Crowd

Robin's Nest is a British sitcom produced by Thames Television that aired on the ITV network for six series from 11 January 1977 to 31 March 1981. Richard O'Sullivan reprised the role of Robin Tripp, a lead character from the sitcom Man About the House, which had ended on 7 April 1976. The series ran concurrently with the other Man About the House spin-off George and Mildred (which focused on the subsequent life of the Ropers), and co-starred Tessa Wyatt as Robin's girlfriend and later wife Vicky, and Tony Britton as her father. O'Sullivan and Wyatt were a romantic couple in real life at the time and had a son together.

== Premise ==
Robin Tripp and Vicky Nicholls are an unmarried couple who share a flat over an abandoned Chinese takeaway owned by Vicky's father James. Vicky refuses to wed Robin despite his continuous proposals, as she is averse to marriage after witnessing her parents' contentious marriage and divorce. Robin opens a French bistro called Robin's Nest in the abandoned space, with James as his business partner and landlord. James, who disapproves of Robin and his living arrangement with Vicky, frequently interferes with the operation of the restaurant. James also frequently clashes with his ex-wife Marion. Robin employs a clumsy one-armed dishwasher called Albert Riddle. Robin and Vicky eventually marry, and Vicky gives birth to a set of twins. At the end of the last episode, Vicky tells Robin that she is pregnant again.

== Cast ==
- Richard O'Sullivan as Robin Tripp
- Tessa Wyatt as Victoria (Vicky) Nicholls
- Tony Britton as James Nicholls
- David Kelly as Albert Riddle
- Peggy Aitchison as Gertrude
- Honor Blackman/Barbara Murray as Marion Nicholls

== Production ==
Creators and writers Brian Cooke and Johnnie Mortimer gained special permission from the Independent Broadcasting Authority, the regulatory body for television in Britain, to portray an unmarried couple living together, especially because of scenes in which Robin and Vicky are undressed in bed together.

The location of the restaurant featured in the show can be found in the Notting Hill/Holland Park area on Portland Road at the junction with Hippodrome Place and Clarendon Cross.

== Theme music ==
The show's star Richard O'Sullivan wrote the theme music, which was arranged and performed by Brian Bennett of the Shadows.

== Foreign adaptations ==
The show was adapted in the United States as Three's a Crowd, a sequel to Three's Company, which had been based on Man About the House, but it was unsuccessful, lasting for only one season.

In 2004, a Polish version was created under the title Dziupla Cezara.

== Episodes ==
Series	Episodes	Originally released	
Series	Episodes	First released	Last released
1	7	11 January 1977	22 February 1977
2	6	23 February 1978	30 March 1978
3	13	25 September 1978	18 December 1978
4	7	22 February 1979	5 April 1979
Special		27 December 1979	
5	6	8 January 1980	12 February 1980
Special		24 December 1980	
6	7	17 February 1981	31 March 1981

=== Series 1 (1977) ===
No. overall	No. in series	Title	Produced & Directed by	Written by	Original release date
1	1	"Sleeping Partners"	Peter Frazer-Jones	Johnnie Mortimer, Brian Cooke	11 January 1977
Robin Tripp, now a fully qualified but unemployed chef, lives with his girlfriend Vicky and plans to open a bistro in the vacant space below their flat that is owned by Vicky's father James Nicholls.
2	2	"The Bistro Kids"	Peter Frazer-Jones	Johnnie Mortimer, Brian Cooke	18 January 1977
The bistro opens despite Robin's problems with a stuffed bear, half a pig and a health inspector.
3	3	"A Little Competition"	Peter Frazer-Jones	Johnnie Mortimer, Brian Cooke	25 January 1977
Vicky's successful former boyfriend, who runs the steakhouse next door, appears, and James schemes to bring them together again.
4	4	"The Maternal Triangle"	Peter Frazer-Jones	Johnnie Mortimer, Brian Cooke	1 February 1977
Robin is afraid to meet Vicky's mother, whose nasty reputation precedes her.
5	5	"Piggy in the Middle"	Peter Frazer-Jones	Johnnie Mortimer, Brian Cooke	8 February 1977
James becomes involved with a young female artist who leaves him for a younger man.
6	6	"A Matter of Note"	Peter Frazer-Jones	Johnnie Mortimer, Brian Cooke	15 February 1977
When a counterfeit bill is discovered, Robin must attend a police identity parade in which James is among the suspects.
7	7	"Oh, Happy Day"	Peter Frazer-Jones	Johnnie Mortimer, Brian Cooke	22 February 1977
Vicky finally agrees to marry Robin, but James is determined to control every aspect of the ceremony.

=== Series 2 (1978) ===
No. overall	No. in series	Title	Produced & Directed by	Written by	Original release date
8	1	"As Long As He Needs Me"	Peter Frazer-Jones	Johnnie Mortimer, Brian Cooke	23 February 1978
Vicky stays with James when he is ill, but Robin fears that it is a plan to keep her away from him.
9	2	"The Seven Pound Fiddle"	Peter Frazer-Jones	Johnnie Mortimer, Brian Cooke	2 March 1978
After James fires Albert for a theft that he did not commit, Robin and Vicky search for Albert all over London.
10	3	"Ups & Downs"	Peter Frazer-Jones	Johnnie Mortimer, Brian Cooke	9 March 1978
Robin and James become trapped in the cellar beneath the restaurant.
11	4	"Three Times Table"	Peter Frazer-Jones	Johnnie Mortimer, Brian Cooke	16 March 1978
When the steakhouse next door proposes to purchase the space occupied by Robin's Nest, James tries to persuade Robin to relocate.
12	5	"Great Expectations"	Peter Frazer-Jones	Johnnie Mortimer, Brian Cooke	23 March 1978
Victoria mistakenly believes that she is pregnant, which causes James to dream of what his grandchild will become.
13	6	"Love & Marriage"	Peter Frazer-Jones	Johnnie Mortimer, Brian Cooke	30 March 1978
Robin and Vicky finally marry, but they exchange James' gift of a trip to Paris for a freezer. Note: Robin's brother Norman (Norman Eshley), who married Chrissy (Paula Wilcox) in the final episode of Man About the House, is mentioned, but neither Eshley nor Wilcox appears in this episode. Hilda Krizeman reprises her role as Mrs. Tripp, but Robin's father is played by David Lodge; Leslie Sands had played the role in Man About the House.

=== Series 3 (1978) ===
No. overall	No. in series	Title	Produced & Directed by	Written by	Original release date
14	1	"You Need Hands"	Peter Frazer-Jones	Bernard McKenna, Johnnie Mortimer, Brian Cooke	25 September 1978
Nicholls decides he needs a cabaret and who better to provide it than Sidney Bacharach, one of the finest pianists of 1927? However, it looks like the restaurant may close anyway: Robin has damaged his cooking arm, and Albert refuses to lend a hand.
15	2	"The Candidate"	Peter Frazer-Jones	David Norton, Roger Taylor, Johnnie Mortimer	2 October 1978
Nicholls decides to run as a candidate in the local elections, using the restaurant as his campaign headquarters. But canvassing and coq au vin is a recipe for disaster.
16	3	"Just Deserts"	Peter Frazer-Jones	Bernard McKenna, Johnnie Mortimer, Brian Cooke	9 October 1978
Nicholls gets his fingers burned when an old flame of Robin's turns up at the restaurant. Robin deserts the nest and moves in with his father-in-law.
17	4	"Away From All What?"	Peter Frazer-Jones	Charlotte Bingham, Terence Brady, Johnnie Mortimer	16 October 1978
It has been ages since Vicky and Robin had a holiday. But Nicholls refuses to pay for a stand-in chef - until Robin gets the mumps.
18	5	"England Expects"	Peter Frazer-Jones	David Norton, Roger Taylor, Johnnie Mortimer	23 October 1978
Nicholls' regimental reunion is due, and where better for him to hold it than Robin's Nest? Unfortunately, along with the Regiment and the Regimental silver goes the Regimental menu: Trenchmouth soup, boiled mutton and Lady Daphne's Delight - spotted dick!
19	6	"Once Two Is Three"	Peter Frazer-Jones	Jon Watkins, Johnnie Mortimer, Brian Cooke	30 October 1978
Robin has the chance to open a new restaurant in Brighton, 60 miles from his father-in-law. But Nicholls uses his mind-reading ability on Albert to forestall the deal.
20	7	"Dinner Date"	Peter Frazer-Jones	Terence Feely, Johnnie Mortimer, Brian Cooke	6 November 1978
An old girlfriend returns to England and recaptures Nicholls' fancy. Marriage is a possibility and Robin is keen on the idea.
21	8	"Everything You Wish Yourself"	Peter Frazer-Jones	Willis Hall, Johnnie Mortimer, Brian Cooke	13 November 1978
A mix-up in dates brings Albert an unexpected Bonus.
22	9	"Be It Ever Be So Humble"	Peter Frazer-Jones	Ken Hoare, Johnnie Mortimer, Brian Cooke	20 November 1978
There's a crisis in the bistro when Albert resigns as a washer-upper. Vicky and Robin discover they've been breaking the law.
23	10	"Day Trippers"	Peter Frazer-Jones	Bernard McKenna, Johnnie Mortimer, Brian Cooke	27 November 1978
Robin and Vicky decide there's nothing like a nice peaceful picnic on their day off. And that's exactly what they get...nothing like a nice peaceful picnic.
24	11	"The Long Distance Runner"	Peter Frazer-Jones	Jon Watkins, Johnnie Mortimer, Brian Cooke	4 December 1978
Robin decides to take up jogging, so it seems, but does he have another reason for going out early in the morning? Nicholls is shocked when he finds out the truth.
25	12	"At Harm's Length"	Peter Frazer-Jones	Terence Brady, Charlotte Bingham, Johnnie Mortimer	11 December 1978
Vicky thinks her Uncle Sam is playing around with another woman. Despite Robin's protests she decides to do something about it.
26	13	"The Happy Hen"	Peter Frazer-Jones	Dave Freeman, Johnnie Mortimer, Brian Cooke	18 December 1978
Nicholls' ambition to own all the eating outlets in Fulham takes a step forward. He buys the building next door to Robin's Nest to pursue his plans of opening up an omelette house. However, he ends up with egg on his face.

=== Series 4 (1979) ===
No. overall	No. in series	Title	Produced & Directed by	Written by	Original release date
27	1	"Should Auld Acquaintance"	Peter Frazer-Jones	Dave Freeman, Johnnie Mortimer, Brian Cooke	22 February 1979
The bistro, newly decorated and open for business, is threatened with sudden closure after Robin encounters an old friend in dire need. Nicholls pulls a few strings in Fleet Street. Albert is confronted by a lady in her underwear, and Vicky contemplates leaving home.
28	2	"Person Friday Required"	Peter Frazer-Jones	Adele Rose, Johnnie Mortimer, Brian Cooke	1 March 1979
A chance meeting with an old colleague starts Vicky wondering if it's wise for husbands and wives to work together. A return to her airline job could put the mystery back into her marriage.
29	3	"Lost Weekend"	Peter Frazer-Jones	Adele Rose, Johnnie Mortimer, Brian Cooke	8 March 1979
Lucky Albert wins a weekend away from it all. But a little conniving turns it into a busman's holiday for Robin and Vicky - and a not-so-lucky reunion for Nicholls.
30	4	"Too Many Waiters Spoil The Bistro"	Peter Frazer-Jones	Bernard McKenna, Johnnie Mortimer, Brian Cooke	15 March 1979
Nicholls has an idea: he can increase the profits in the restaurant by increasing the number of tables. This leads to an increase in staff, which causes an increase in problems.
31	5	"September Song"	Peter Frazer-Jones	George Layton, Johnnie Mortimer, Brian Cooke	22 March 1979
Robin's relationship with Nicholls is bad at the best of times but, when Vicky comes home to find them brawling in the street, she suspects that her father is not well. When Nicholls apologises to Robin, she's certain of it.
32	6	"Sorry Partner"	Peter Frazer-Jones	David Norton, Roger Taylor, Johnnie Mortimer	29 March 1979
Robin and Vicky are kept busy when Nicholls tries to recapture lost glory on the badminton court.
33	7	"Albert's Ball"	Peter Frazer-Jones	Richard Waring, Gail Renard, Johnnie Mortimer	5 April 1979
Albert's anniversary party looks like being his farewell party when a customer gets more than he ordered - and Robin's Nest acquires a pest.

=== Christmas Special (1979) ===
No. overall	Title	Produced & Directed by	Written by	Original release date
34	"Christmas at Robin's Nest"	Peter Frazer-Jones	George Layton, Johnnie Mortimer, Brian Cooke	27 December 1979
Christmas in the Robin's Nest household is just like everywhere else - bad tempers and frayed nerves, with a touch of seasonal goodwill thrown in. Of course, Christmas is also a time for surprises, and the biggest surprise for Robin is one that he can well do without!

=== Series 5 (1980) ===
No. overall	No. in series	Title	Produced & Directed by	Written by	Original release date
35	1	"Pastures New"	Peter Frazer-Jones	George Layton, Johnnie Mortimer, Brian Cooke	8 January 1980
Robin is fed up with slaving over a hot stove and decides to fly the nest in favour of warmer climes. He's unaware, however, that other plans have already been hatched.
36	2	"A Man of Property"	Peter Frazer-Jones	George Layton, Johnnie Mortimer, Brian Cooke	15 January 1980
With the forthcoming arrival of Robin and Vicky's baby, they realise that they will need more room in the Nest - the question is: where will they find it?
37	3	"If You Pass 'Go' Collect £200"	Peter Frazer-Jones	George Layton, Johnnie Mortimer, Brian Cooke	22 January 1980
With the new responsibility of fatherhood, Robin wants to buy out his father-in-law's share of the bistro. The bid looks doomed until Nicholls gets an alternative proposition - from Albert.
38	4	"Never Look A Gift Horse.."	Peter Frazer-Jones	Adele Rose, Johnnie Mortimer, Brian Cooke	29 January 1980
Prospective grandparents can often get more excited over forthcoming offspring than the parents-to-be, and Robin's mother-in-law, Marion, is no exception. It must be nothing but the best for her grandchild.
39	5	"Just An Old-fashioned Girl"	Peter Frazer-Jones	Adele Rose, Johnnie Mortimer, Brian Cooke	5 February 1980
Robin and Vicky find that they are becoming "go-betweens", what with James Nicholls finding himself a new romantic interest and Gertrude getting herself in a tizzy's over Albert.
40	6	"Great Expectations"	Peter Frazer-Jones	George Layton, Johnnie Mortimer, Brian Cooke	12 February 1980
The signs are all there that the baby is imminent: Nicholls is tense, Robin is having nightmares and Vicky is bored.

=== Christmas Special (1980) ===
No. overall	Title	Produced & Directed by	Written by	Original release date
41	"No Room at the Inn"	Peter Frazer-Jones	Johnnie Mortimer (uncredited), Brian Cooke (uncredited)	24 December 1980
Christmas dinner at the bistro isn't the same without Vicky and the twins. With three men and a turkey, the family get-together lacks a woman's touch. But when Marion turns up to provide it, peace on earth flies out of the window.

=== Series 6 (1981) ===
No. overall	No. in series	Title	Produced & Directed by	Written by	Original release date
42	1	"Move Over Darling"	Peter Frazer-Jones	George Layton, Johnnie Mortimer, Brian Cooke	17 February 1981
Running a bistro and trying to visit Vicky and the newborn babies is not easy until, to Nicholls' and Vicky's surprise, Robin decides to delegate. But their surprise turns to horror when they hear whom he has chosen.
43	2	"The Home Coming"	Peter Frazer-Jones	George Layton, Johnnie Mortimer, Brian Cooke	24 February 1981
It's time for Vicky and the twins to come home, and the rivalry between Robin and Nicholls over whose car she should travel in from the hospital causes more than a little friction.
44	3	"No Smoke Without Fire"	Peter Frazer-Jones	George Layton, Johnnie Mortimer, Brian Cooke	3 March 1981
There's consternation in the Tripp household when Albert suspects that "something" is going on between Gertrude and...another man!
45	4	"When Irish Eyes Are Smiling"	Peter Frazer-Jones	George Layton, Johnnie Mortimer, Brian Cooke	10 March 1981
A change is as good as a rest, and it's a rest that Vicky and Robin need. So they go to stay with Grandad and things don't work out too well - just for a change.
46	5	"Anniversary Waltz"	Peter Frazer-Jones	George Layton, Johnnie Mortimer, Brian Cooke	17 March 1981
When all the food is pre-cooked and ready for a private party it seems the ideal night for Vicky and Robin to go out. After all - what can go wrong?
47	6	"Wish You Weren’t Here"	Peter Frazer-Jones	George Layton, Johnnie Mortimer, Brian Cooke	24 March 1981
When Nicholls feels that his daughter needs a bit of a break, his generosity knows no bounds. He even suggests bringing in a temporary chef...so that they can go away without any worries!
48	7	"The Headhunters of SW6"	Peter Frazer-Jones	George Layton, Johnnie Mortimer, Brian Cooke	31 March 1981
When Robin is offered a lucrative and exciting post with an international company, Nicholls has no option but to put the restaurant up for sale.

== Home releases ==
All six series of Robin's Nest have been released on DVD in the UK (Region 2).

All six series have also been released on DVD in Australia (Region 4). Series One and Two appeared on 2 April 2009; after a lengthy delay, Series Three was released on 3 October 2012, followed by Series Four on 6 March 2013, and Series Five and Six on 4 September 2013. For the first time in Australia, The Complete Series Boxset was released on 16 September 2020.

In 2019, a 19-disc box set was released by Network/Fremantle, containing every episode of Man About the House, Robin's Nest and George & Mildred.

DVD	UK Release date
The Complete Series 1	24 September 2007
The Complete Series 2	19 November 2007
The Complete Series 3	26 May 2008
The Complete Series 4	21 July 2008
The Complete Series 5	1 September 2008
The Complete Series 6	3 November 2008
The Complete Series 1–6 boxset	3 November 2008
