= Tom, Dick and Harriet =

Television series

- Genre: Sitcom
- Created by: Johnnie Mortimer; Brian Cooke
- Starring: Lionel Jeffries; Ian Ogilvy; Brigit Forsyth
- Country of origin: United Kingdom
- No. of series: 2
- No. of episodes: 12

Production
- Producer: Michael Mills
- Running time: 30 minutes
- Production company: Thames Television

Original release
- Network: ITV
- Release: 13 September 1982 – 17 February 1983

Tom, Dick and Harriet is a British sitcom that was broadcast for two series from 1982 to 1983. It was created by the sitcom writing team of Johnnie Mortimer and Brian Cooke, and it starred veteran actor Lionel Jeffries in one of his few television roles, only seven months after his previous TV sitcom role in Father Charlie, Ian Ogilvy and Brigit Forsyth also appeared.

It was made by Thames Television for the ITV network.

== Plot ==
Thomas Maddison (played by Jeffries) had spent 40 years living in the deepest Cornwall countryside, and hen-pecked at that; his late wife banned him from smoking, drinking, and even casually looking at other women. Upon becoming a widower, Maddison, unable to wait to break free from the shackles that had bound him for so long, heads off to the bright lights of London, where his son Richard (Dick) (played by Ogilvy) lives with his wife Harriet (played by Forsyth). Suffice to say, his rather primitive manners, his disgusting habits, and his womanising creates havoc for his son and his daughter-in-law, both of them being well-manicured executives; him in advertising, her in magazine publishing. However, in the second series, Harriet conceives and (in a rather speedy nine months) delivers Richard a son and Thomas a grandson.

== Episodes ==
Series	Episodes	Originally released	
Series	Episodes	First released	Last released
1	6	13 September 1982	18 October 1982
2	6	13 January 1983	17 February 1983

=== Series 1 (1982) ===
No. overall	No. in series	Title	Directed by	Written by	Original release date
1	1	"On the Town"	Michael Mills	Johnnie Mortimer and Brian Cooke	13 September 1982
2	2	"Where There's a Will"	Michael Mills	Johnnie Mortimer and Brian Cooke	20 September 1982
3	3	"Currying Favour"	Michael Mills	Johnnie Mortimer and Brian Cooke	27 September 1982
4	4	"The Last Time I Saw Paris"	Michael Mills	Johnnie Mortimer and Brian Cooke	4 October 1982
5	5	"Dog in the Manger"	Michael Mills	Johnnie Mortimer and Brian Cooke	11 October 1982
6	6	"Paternal Triangle"	Michael Mills	Johnnie Mortimer and Brian Cooke	18 October 1982

=== Series 2 (1983) ===
No. overall	No. in series	Title	Directed by	Written by	Original release date
7	1	"A Room with a View"	Michael Mills	Johnnie Mortimer and Brian Cooke	13 January 1983
8	2	"Baby Blues"	Michael Mills	Johnnie Mortimer and Brian Cooke	20 January 1983
9	3	"Country Life"	Michael Mills	Johnnie Mortimer and Brian Cooke	27 January 1983
10	4	"From Here to Maternity"	Michael Mills	Johnnie Mortimer and Brian Cooke	3 February 1983
11	5	"None Shall Sleep"	Michael Mills	Johnnie Mortimer and Brian Cooke	10 February 1983
12	6	"Get Out and Get Under"	Michael Mills	Johnnie Mortimer and Brian Cooke	17 February 1983

== Ratings ==
Ratings for the first series were very strong, with each episode being watched by between 11.3 and 13.75 million, with all but one of the episodes in the top five of the TV charts. Ratings for the second series were lower, with the first five episodes failing to make the ITV-only top ten, at a time when 13 million was needed to enter it. However, the final episode ranked fourth in the overall TV charts, with 14.6 million watching.

== Other versions ==
Like other Thames sitcoms of the 1980s, the format of Tom, Dick and Harriet was sold to the US, through the US TV producer and executive Don L. Taffner, who distributed Thames material to US TV in both format and syndication. It was sold to CBS in the same year that the original series finished in the UK, and the US version was named Foot at the Door. D.L. Taffner's production company managed to make 6 episodes of it after which it was cancelled. In the US version, the widower was named Jonah Foot, and he was played by Harold Gould. Foot had lived in New Hampshire, and following his wife's death he moved to New York City, living in the Manhattan apartment of his son Jim, played by Kenneth Gilman, and his wife Harriet, played by Diana Canova, best known for her roles in Soap (TV series) and later in Throb.

However, in 1993, 10 years after the second and last series of Tom, Dick and Harriet aired on ITV, its format was sold to the Netherlands. The Dutch version was called Het Zonnetje in Huis. The Dutch version ran for 9 series over 10 years, from 1993 to 2003. It originally began on the Netherlands Public Broadcasting, and it was made by one of its main constituent members VARA. VARA made the first 2 series in 1993 and 1994, after which It moved to the commercial station RTL 4, who made it until the end. In the Dutch version, the widower was named Piet Bovenkerk, played by John Kraaijkamp, Sr., who moved to the Amsterdam apartment of his son Erik, played by Kraaijkamp, Sr.'s son Johnny Kraaijkamp, Jr., and his wife Catharina, played by Martine Bijl.

== Stunt Incident ==
During location filming with Ogilvy for what turned out to be the show's final episode, a stunt involving a car and a lake went very badly wrong, ending up with Jeffries only just managing to get out of the car's front window before the vehicle sank in 45 feet of water.
