= Moon and Son =

Television series

- Genre: Crime drama; Thriller
- Created by: Robert Banks Stewart
- Starring: Millicent Martin; John Michie; Ian Redford; Laure Killing; Anita Graham; Patrick Drury
- Composer: Denis King
- Country of origin: United Kingdom
- Original language: English
- No. of series: 1
- No. of episodes: 13

Production
- Producer: Robert Banks Stewart
- Production locations: Folkestone; France
- Editor: Colin Giffin
- Running time: 50 minutes

Original release
- Network: BBC One
- Release: 4 January – 28 March 1992

Moon and Son is a British television crime drama, created and produced by Robert Banks Stewart, that broadcast on BBC One from January 4, 1992.

The series was Millicent Martin's first British role in fifteen years, and was considered to be a "rare misfire" for creator Banks Stewart (who described this series as "a light-hearted thriller"), whose previous series Bergerac and Shoestring had enjoyed significant success on British television.

Despite reports that the BBC had already commissioned a second series prior to the first series being broadcast, only thirteen episodes were made and the series was swiftly axed due to poor ratings, despite airing in a primetime Saturday evening slot. To date, the series has only been repeated once on Satellite TV, and has never been released on DVD.

== Premise ==
The series starred Millicent Martin as clairvoyant and astrologer Gladys Moon, whose ability is more instinctive than psychic and John Michie as her psychic son, Trevor, who travel between Folkestone, England and France, conducting readings and selling occult and astrological goods from their mobile "Astral Centre Salon" called "Visions" and getting involved in various police investigations along the way.

== Background ==
Alongside Martin and Michie, Laure Killing co-starred as Cecille Coulmier, Trevor's girlfriend. Other characters include the zany Zelda, a medium friend of Gladys' played by Anita Graham, Sergeant Eavis, played by Ian Redford, and Inspector Sardou, played by Patrick Drury.

The series was mostly filmed in Kent and France. A variety of locations were used for filming, including Folkestone, Kent and East Sussex Railway, Oare Marshes, Chilham Castle, Crabble Corn Mill, Dover, Deal, Folkestone Harbour, Dungeness Estate, The Grand Folkestone, The Leas Cliff Hall and The Romney, Hythe and Dymchurch Railway.

Christine Buttner of Ravensbourne University London acted as astrological adviser to the programme, emphasising the astrological elements of the storyline, with crystal balls, phrenological heads, hand reading and healing crystals.

== Cast ==
- Millicent Martin as Gladys Moon
- John Michie as Trevor Moon
- Laure Killing as Cecille Coulmier
- Anita Graham as Zelda Lee
- Ian Redford as Detective Sergeant Eavis
- Patrick Drury as Inspector Sardou
- Veronica Lang as Annabelle Garvie

== Episodes ==
No.	Title	Directed by	Written by	Original release date
1	"Crystal Clear It's Murder"	Robert Tronson	Robert Banks Stewart	4 January 1992
Gladys is drawn into investigations when an engineer is found murdered in Boulogne, but it is her son who has a gift that can help the French police.
2	"Star of Fortune"	Ken Grieve	Michael Aitkens	11 January 1992
When a serial murderer strikes in Kent, the Moons are recruited by Detective Sergeant Eavis, but the Chief Constable produces a rival astrologer.
3	"G.I. Joe is Missing"	Roger Tucker	Robert Banks Stewart	18 January 1992
Gladys employs a psychic approach to the mystery of Joe Thorpe's disappearance, while Trevor conducts his own style of investigation.
4	"Where No Birds Sing"	John Strickland	Michael Aitkens	25 January 1992
A young microlight flyer finds a Roman silver plate, complete with astrological signs on its rim, and takes it to Gladys for an expert opinion. But then Cecile sees a ghost and Gladys finds herself in danger, as the Moons uncover a tragic tale of recklessness and evil on a tranquil Kent hillside.
5	"The Horns of Capricorn"	Moira Armstrong	Jim Hawkins	1 February 1992
Trevor's determination to help the police catch a strangler begins to seem like an obsession. But one of the intended victims is Cecile, and the killer is closer to home than anyone thinks.
6	"Nearly Dearly Departed"	John Strickland	Gawn Grainger	8 February 1992
Other people's guilty secrets can prove a risky business for clairvoyants, especially if someone mentions murder. An old lady in a nursing home sends Gladys on an unexpected journey, and Trevor helps the police to lay an extremely unorthodox trap.
7	"A Foreign Body"	Moira Armstrong	Gawn Grainger	15 February 1992
A young woman is found dead in the boot of a car belonging to Euro-MP Howard Garvie. Gladys takes a palm print to help the police solve the riddle of the victim's identity, and the murder trail leads to France and the infamous Chateau Salubre, playground of the rich.
8	"Her Death Was So Sudden"	Paul Harrison	Robert Banks Stewart	22 February 1992
A honeymoon couple are amused when Gladys reads the runes for them, but the promise of a happy future soon turns into a nightmare.
9	"Past, Present and Future"	Ken Grieve	Stephen Mayne	29 February 1992
Gladys and Trevor are determined to help the servants in a stately home whose employer has died, leaving them only the ghost of a chance of finding a will that could repay their devotion.
10	"Music in the Air"	Paul Harrison	Colin Giffin	7 March 1992
The Moons are asked to probe the background of a gentle south coast faith healer, when he claims that John Lennon is using him to produce a string of new pop songs. The compositions could spell a fortune for charity and the record industry alike, but tragedy hovers over the new album.
11	"The Chinese Medicine Man"	Henry Herbert	Nick McCarty	14 March 1992
When Martin Shan, a popular south coast doctor, comes under suspicion of theft and murder, Trevor tries a little oriental sorcery of his own.
12	"The Place of Cold Fires"	Henry Herbert	Leslie Darbon	21 March 1992
Eavis suspects the Moons are working outside the law when a Foreign Legionnaire's return to Folkestone sparks off a hunt for stolen diamonds.
13	"S.O.S. From A Gemini"	Roger Tucker	Alan Goldstreet	28 March 1992
A child hears a strange song, and danger threatens Gladys and Trevor as they help a young English couple who believe that ghosts from a far-off tragedy are haunting their newly acquired farmhouse.
