= Too Close for Comfort =

American sitcom (1980–1987)

- Also known as: The Ted Knight Show (season 6 title)
- Genre: Sitcom
- Based on: Keep It in the Family created by Brian Cooke
- Developed by: Arne Sultan; Earl Barret
- Directed by: Russ Petranto; Phil Ramuno; Will Mackenzie; John Bowab; Peter Baldwin (season 5); Phil Ramuno & Charles S. Dubin (season 6)
- Starring: Ted Knight; Nancy Dussault; Lydia Cornell (seasons 1–5); Jim J. Bullock; Deborah Van Valkenburgh (seasons 1–5); Deena Freeman (season 2); Audrey Meadows (season 3, regular; seasons 4–5, recurring); Pat Carroll (season 6); Lisa Antille (season 6)
- Opening theme: "Too Close for Comfort", performed by Johnny Mandel
- Composer: (all season 4, 5.1, 5.2, 5.3, 5.12, multiples)
- Country of origin: United States
- Original language: English
- No. of seasons: 6
- No. of episodes: 129 (list of episodes)

Production
- Executive producers: Earl Barret; Arne Sultan (seasons 1–4); Aaron Ruben (seasons 5–6)
- Producers: Austin Kalish & Irma Kalish (seasons 1–2); Douglas Arango & Phil Doran (season 3); George Yanok (seasons 4–6)
- Camera setup: Videotape; multi-camera
- Running time: 24 minutes
- Production companies: D.L. Taffner Productions; Metromedia Producers Corporation; Fox Television Stations (season 6)

Original release
- Network: ABC (1980–1983); Syndication (1984–1987)
- Release: November 11, 1980 – February 7, 1987

Related
- Keep It in the Family; Family Business

Too Close for Comfort is an American sitcom television series aired on ABC from November 11, 1980, to May 5, 1983, and in first-run syndication from April 7, 1984, to February 7, 1987. Its name was changed to The Ted Knight Show when the show was retooled in 1986 for its sixth season, which would turn out to be its last due to Ted Knight's death. The original concept of the series was based on the 1980s British sitcom Keep It in the Family. Knight plays work-at-home cartoonist Henry Rush, who is married to Muriel. Their two adult daughters, Jackie and Sara, live in the downstairs apartment of their San Francisco two-flat. An episode involving the daughters moving across the bay to Oakland and the family complaining about crime, undrinkable water, and the constant sound of police sirens saw the episode being briefly protested by Oakland politicians. The family moves to Marin County for the show's final season, where Henry Rush becomes a co-owner of the local weekly newspaper.

== Synopsis ==
Henry and Muriel Rush are owners of a two-unit house at 171–173 Buena Vista Avenue East in San Francisco, California. Henry is a conservative cartoonist who authors a comic strip called Cosmic Cow with a hand-puppet version of "Cosmic Cow." Muriel is a freelance photographer. They have two adult daughters, Jackie and Sara.

Additional characters include Sara's friend, Monroe Ficus, and Henry's boss, Arthur Wainwright, who was head of Wainwright Publishing. The character of Monroe was originally intended to be used for only a single episode but producers added the character to the series.

A running gag throughout the series was Henry’s wardrobe consisting of a sweatshirt representing a specific college. After the University of Michigan appeared in the pilot episode, students began sending in shirts from their school for Knight to wear on the program. A total of 107 schools were included, with Oregon State University and Northwestern University tying for the most appearances.

=== Seasons 2 and 3 ===
The cast of Too Close for Comfort during the show's second season

During its second season, the series' principal stories were focused around Muriel's pregnancy. Henry's niece April comes from Delaware to live with the Rush family. The season concludes with Muriel giving birth to a son, Andrew (later played regularly by twins William and Michael Cannon from 1983 to 1984).

In the fall of 1982, ABC moved the series to Thursday nights, which proved to be disastrous and the show saw its ratings fall drastically. The network canceled the series at the conclusion of the season after falling from #6 for the 1981–82 season to #38 for the 1982–83 season.

=== First-run syndication ===
During the early 1980s, TV station owner Metromedia was expanding its portfolio of original syndicated programming through its production subsidiary, Metromedia Producers Corporation. When Too Close for Comfort was canceled by ABC, Metromedia Producers Corporation elected to pick up the series and began producing all-new episodes to run on various stations throughout the country. Starting in April 1984, a total of 23 new episodes were broadcast for the show's fourth season, featuring the same cast as seen on the ABC episodes. The show's ratings improved in syndication and Metromedia ordered an additional 30 episodes, airing through November 1985. When the fifth season began, a single child actor, Joshua Goodwin, played the role of Andrew Rush.

==== The Ted Knight Show ====
The Ted Knight Show title screen. Only used for first run episodes; reruns use the Too Close for Comfort title.

In late 1985, several changes were made before production started for Season 6. The show's title was changed to The Ted Knight Show (not to be confused with the 1978 CBS show of the same name), and the premise and setting were altered. Henry retires from drawing Cosmic Cow and, along with Muriel and Andrew, moves to Marin County where he buys a share of a local newspaper and becomes its editor. Monroe continues to appear and later takes a job with Henry's paper as a reporter. Pat Carroll played the role of Hope Stinson, who owns the majority share of the newspaper and serves as a foil for Henry. In addition, the Rushes hire a live-in domestic employee, played by Lisa Antille. The characters of Jackie and Sara do not appear. Muriel's mother Iris makes a guest appearance.

First-run episodes of The Ted Knight Show were broadcast starting in April 1986. Twenty-two episodes were produced prior to the summer of 1986 and 12 had aired by mid-July. The revamped show was scheduled to resume production when Knight, who had been battling colon cancer since 1985, died on August 26, 1986. The ten remaining first-run episodes were broadcast between September 1986 and February 1987. This season's episodes were added to the Too Close for Comfort syndication package with the original show's title. The 22 episodes were shown with the original The Ted Knight Show banner in January 2026, when American classic television network Antenna TV began airing the retooled sixth season on the schedule separately from Too Close for Comfort.

== Cast ==
- Ted Knight as Henry Rush
- Nancy Dussault as Muriel Rush
- Deborah Van Valkenburgh as Jackie Rush (1980–1985)
- Lydia Cornell as Sara Rush (1980–1985)
- Jim J. Bullock as Monroe Ficus
- Hamilton Camp as Arthur Wainwright (1981)
- Deena Freeman as April Rush (1981–1982)
- Audrey Meadows as Iris Martin (1982–1983, guest appearances thereafter)
- William and Michael Cannon as Andrew Rush (1983–1984)
- Joshua Goodwin as Andrew Rush (1985–1986)
- Pat Carroll as Hope Stinson (1986)
- Lisa Antille as Lisa Flores (1986)

=== Notable guest stars ===
- Peter Haskell
- Georgann Johnson
- Hillary B. Smith
- Selma Diamond as Mildred Rafkin
- Jordan Suffin as Officer Brad Turner
- Elyse Knight (daughter of Ted Knight) as Samantha Bishop ("The Runaway," 1984)
- Graham Jarvis as Arthur Wainwright (1985)
- Ernie Wise as Ernie Dockery (1985)
- Jim Davis (creator of the comic strip Garfield) as himself (1986)
- Walter Lantz (creator of Woody Woodpecker) as himself
- Ray Middleton as Henry's father, Huey Rush

== Episodes ==
Season	Episodes	Originally released			Rank	Rating
Season	Episodes	First released	Last released	Network	Rank	Rating
1	19	November 11, 1980	May 12, 1981	ABC	15	20.8 (Tied with Happy Days)
2	22	October 13, 1981	May 11, 1982	ABC	6	22.6 (Tied with The Dukes of Hazzard)
3	22	September 30, 1982	May 5, 1983	ABC	38	—N/a
4	23	April 7, 1984	December 8, 1984	Syndication	—N/a	—N/a
5	21	February 5, 1985	November 23, 1985	Syndication	—N/a	—N/a
6	22	April 5, 1986	February 7, 1987	Syndication	—N/a	—N/a

== Syndication ==
ABC aired reruns of the show during its daytime schedule from June to September 1983. The show entered daily broadcast syndication in the fall of 1986, which continued until 2003. The show currently airs on Antenna TV weekday afternoons at 4:00pm & 4:30pm ET and Sundays from 9:00am-11:00 ET. The syndication rights for Too Close for Comfort are held by DLT Entertainment, a production and distribution company owned by show producer Donald L. Taffner.

In the U.S., reruns currently air on streaming services Pluto TV and Tubi.

== Home media ==
Rhino Entertainment Company (under its Rhino Retrovision classic TV entertainment brand) released the first two seasons of Too Close for Comfort on DVD in Region 1 in 2004/2005. However, Rhino's release used the versions of episodes that were edited for syndication, missing several minutes of footage in each, including the tag sequences. The episodes are also dubbed to replace references to Oakland with "Oldtown", as Oakland city officials had decried the show's denigration of the city during the show's original run.

In January 2024, Visual Entertainment Inc. revealed on Facebook that they were working on a complete series box set. That box set was released on April 3, 2024.

DVD name	Ep #	Release date
The Complete First Season	19	November 2, 2004
The Complete Second Season	22	June 7, 2005
The Complete Series	129	April 3, 2024
