= Stacy Dorning =

English actress

- Born: 11 May 1958 (age 67); London, England
- Occupations: Film and television actress

Stacy Dorning (born 11 May 1958) is an English actress, best known for appearing in the second series of The Adventures of Black Beauty (1973–74). She also appeared in Just William (1977–78) and Keep It in the Family (1980–83).

Dorning was born in London; she is the elder daughter of actors Robert Dorning and Honor Shepherd, and older sister of actress Kate Dorning.

== TV credits ==
Year	Title	Role
1973–1974	The Adventures of Black Beauty (series 2)	Jenny Gordon
1976	Space: 1999 – "The Exiles"	Zova
1978	The Chiffy Kids	Ava
1977–1978	Just William	Ethel Brown
1978	The Light Princess (TV film)	Princess
1979	Sherlock Holmes and Doctor Watson; Episode: 'The Case of Harry Crocker'	Miss Za-Za
1979	The Jim Davidson Show	
1979	Dick Turpin Episode: 'The Pursuit'	Belinda
1979	Shoestring Episode: 'Private Ear'	
1982	The Barretts of Wimpole Street (TV film)	Bella Hedley
1980–1983	Keep It in the Family	Susan Rush
1984	Let's Parlez Franglais	
1984	Minder Episode: 'Second Hand Pose'	Abigail Collins
1985	Miss Marple: A Pocket Full of Rye (TV film)	Adele Fortescue
1990–1991	The New Adventures of Black Beauty	Dr Jenny Denning
1997	Noel's House Party	Suzy

== Film credits ==
Year	Title	Role
1970	Cromwell	Mary Cromwell
1977	Terror of Frankenstein a.k.a. Victor Frankenstein	Elizabeth
