= William Franklyn =

English actor (1925–2006)

- Born: William Leo Beare; 22 September 1925; Kensington, London, England
- Died: 31 October 2006 (aged 81); London, England
- Occupation: Actor
- Height: 6' (1.83 m)
- Spouse(s): Margo Johns (1952–1962) (1 child); Susannah Carroll (1969–2006) (2 children) (his death)

William Leo Franklyn (né Beare; 22 September 1925 – 31 October 2006) was an English actor, perhaps best known for voicing the "Schhh... You Know Who" adverts for Schweppes from 1965 to 1973. He also performed on stage, film, television and radio, taking over from Peter Jones as "The Book" (the narrator) in the third, fourth and fifth radio series of The Hitchhiker's Guide to the Galaxy. He is also known for his portrayal of Sexton Blake for BBC Radio 4 in 1967.

== Early life ==
Franklyn was born William Leo Beare in Kensington into an acting family: his maternal grandfather, Arthur Rigby Sr. and uncle, Arthur Rigby Jr., mother, Mary Rigby, and father, Leo Franklyn, were all actors. He was taken to Australia as a baby, where his father toured with musical comedies. The young Franklyn attended Wesley and Haileybury Colleges, both in Melbourne, and developed an abiding love of cricket. He later trialled as a fast bowler for Essex, and opened the bowling for the Stage Cricket Club. He also became a leg spinner, and ran his own team, the Sargentmen, raising money for the Malcolm Sargent Cancer Fund for Children.

He returned to London, aged 11. He was evacuated to Luscombe Castle in Devon in the Second World War. His stage career began at the age of 18, when he appeared in My Sister Eileen at the Savoy Theatre in 1943. He was called up to join the Parachute Regiment, and was sent to Palestine.

== Career ==
He appeared in Arsenic and Old Lace at Southsea Pier in 1946, soon after he was demobilised, and settled on an acting career. He continued to tour with the play in repertory for six years. In a slow period, he traded as an antiques dealer, taking junk away on a barrow from rich areas of London and selling it as antiques.

He went on to perform on the stage, on television and radio, and in several films. He appeared in several films in the 1950s, including Quatermass 2 in 1957, and took a starring role in the 1961 film Pit of Darkness which was the B-feature shown with Adam Faith's What A Whopper. He featured in the 1965 Morecambe and Wise film The Intelligence Men.

He appeared in London's West End in comedies such as There's a Girl in My Soup and Tunnel of Love. After perfunctory Italian lessons, he directed a version of There's a Girl in My Soup in Italy, with Italian actors, in Italian. On television, he was a panellist on game shows such as What's My Line? and Call My Bluff. He played Jacques Fleury in The Adventures of the Scarlet Pimpernel (1955–56) and Peter Dallas in the spy drama series Top Secret (1961–62), and also appeared in several episodes of The Avengers. He was in TV plays like Mid Level.

Franklyn also was in comedy sketch show What's on Next and was the host of espionage quiz game The Masterspy. He was featured on This Is Your Life (1978), appeared in the 1984 comedy television series The Steam Video Company, and in G.B.H. (1991) and Diana: Her True Story (1993).

He was also known for commercial voice-over work; he appeared on screen in 10 commercials and voiced another 40 from 1965 to 1973. The "Schhh... You Know Who" Schweppes adverts Franklyn voiced were created by Ogilvy and Mather.

He voiced Danger Mouse in the unbroadcast pilot for the British television series (although David Jason replaced him in all broadcast episodes).

On radio, he was the reader of the quotes on BBC Radio 4's Quote Unquote for 11 years, until shortly before his death, and also read for The News Quiz. In 2004 and 2005 he took over the role of "The Book" (the narrator) from his friend Peter Jones for the third, fourth and fifth radio series of The Hitchhiker's Guide to the Galaxy. He also appeared as a guest star in an episode of the sketch show The Skivers.

== Filmography ==
Year	Title	Role	Notes
1952	Secret People	Surgeon	Uncredited
1953	Operation Diplomat	Dr. Gillespie	Uncredited
1954	The Runaway Bus	Crook in Opening Sequence	Voice, Uncredited
1954	Time Is My Enemy	Sgt. Peter Thompson	
1954	The Crowded Day	Studio Official	
1955	Out of the Clouds	Control Tower Radio Operator	Uncredited
1955	The Love Match	Arthur Ford	
1955	Above Us the Waves	No. 1, X2	
1957	Quatermass 2	Brand	
1957	That Woman Opposite	Ned Atwood	
1957	The Flesh Is Weak	Lloyd Buxton	
1958	The Snorkel	Wilson	
1959	Danger Within	Capt. Tony Long	
1960	Upgreen – And at 'Em		
1960	The Big Day	Mr. T. Selkirk	
1961	Fury at Smugglers' Bay	The Captain	
1961	Pit of Darkness	Richard Logan	
1965	The Intelligence Men	Colonel Grant	
1966	Cul-de-sac	Cecil	
1972	Ooh... You Are Awful	Arnold Van Cleef	
1973	The Satanic Rites of Dracula	Torrence	
1983	Nutcracker	Sir Arthur Cartwright	
1993	Splitting Heirs	Andrews	
1996	Robert Rylands' Last Journey	Robert Rylands	

== Personal life ==
Franklyn was married twice: first to Margo Johns in 1952; they had a daughter, actress Sabina Franklyn, but were divorced in 1962. He remarried in 1969; he and his second wife, Susanna, had two daughters, Francesca Franklyn, a film producer, and Melissa Franklyn, an actress.

Franklyn died of prostate cancer on Tuesday, 31 October 2006.
