= The New Adventures of Black Beauty =

1990s television series

- Genre: Children; Drama
- Starring: Series 1 (1990–1991); Amber McWilliams; William Lucas; Stacy Dorning Series 2 (1992); Rebecca Gooden; Caroline Winnall; Peter Evangelista; Michael Burkett
- Theme music composer: Denis King
- Composer: Chris Neal
- Countries of origin: United Kingdom, New Zealand, Australia
- Original language: English
- No. of series: 1990–1991: 1 (UK), 2 (US); 1992: 1
- No. of episodes: 1990–1991: 26; 1992: 26

Production
- Production locations: Series 1 (1990–1991); England, New Zealand Series 2 (1992); Australia
- Running time: 30 minutes
- Production companies: Series 1 (1990–1991); Isambard Productions Ltd; The Fremantle Corporation; Beta/Taurus; London Weekend Television; 7 Network Series 2 (1992); The Fremantle Corporation; Pro Films Pty Ltd; Beta Film; 7 Network

Original release
- Network: ITV
- Release: 1990 – 1992

Related
- The Adventures of Black Beauty

The New Adventures of Black Beauty is a television drama series produced in the early 1990s. The programme, was produced first in New Zealand, then in Australia. The two different productions had different characters and plotlines, unrelated except through the horse, Black Beauty.

The first series of the programme was produced 1990–1991 by Isambard (Black Beauty) Productions Ltd in association with The Fremantle Corporation, and Beta/Taurus produced the series primarily in New Zealand as a continuation of the 1972–1974 television drama series, The Adventures of Black Beauty. Set 20 years after the events of the earlier series, it featured two of the original characters, Dr James Gordon (played by William Lucas) and Jenny Gordon Denning (played by Stacy Dorning). The series was originally aired on ITV in the United Kingdom, and Isambard Productions Ltd produced 26 episodes in total. This production was subsequently aired in the US, where it was split into two series, aired in a different order, and with two episodes ("Horsepower" and "Horse Sense") possibly omitted in some markets.

In 1992, The Fremantle Corporation moved production to Australia with what was for all practical purposes an entirely new series with new characters and a plotline unrelated to the previous episodes. The only connection to earlier works is the use of material from the final episode of the 1990–1991 production, reworked and with a voice-over explaining that Beauty had been released into the Australian wild. This was shown at the beginning of the first episode of the new production.

Though video of the first production has been marketed on its own, the two productions are now being marketed on DVD and in syndication as a single television series, with the 1990–91 production billed as "Series 1" and the 1992 production billed as "Series 2".

In July 2009, Retro Television Network picked up all 104 episodes of The Adventures of Black Beauty (produced in England) and The New Adventures of Black Beauty (both the New Zealand and Australian series), and affiliates began airing them in sequence, listing all 104 episodes as simply Black Beauty.

In the United Kingdom and some other countries, both series of the New Adventures were shown on Horse & Country TV (Sky Channel 253) between 2014 and 2016.

== Plot ==
Series 1 (1990–1991)

Unlike the original series, The Adventures of Black Beauty, which was set and made in England, The New Adventures of Black Beauty was set and made in New Zealand, apart from the first two episodes, which were set and made in England. The series focused upon the character of Victoria 'Vicky' Denning (played by Amber McWilliams). This series is ostensibly set in the year 1907, twenty years after the original series, which was set in the 1880s, although this was never stated explicitly in the original series. However, this may be questionable because the Boer War, which ended in May 1902, is referred to as being fought in the present tense, which would narrow the potential setting considerably because Edward VII has already acceded.

It begins with newlyweds Nigel and Jenny Denning preparing to go to his farm in New Zealand. Jenny is a veterinarian who has been working with her father. Nigel was previously married to the daughter of Lord Fordham, Sarah, who died and is buried at the colonial farm. Their daughter Victoria ("Vicky") has been staying with her grandfather when she has not been attending boarding school, during the two years her father has finished his medical studies in London.

Lord Fordham is opposed to Vicky returning to New Zealand with her father and tries an assortment of bribes and threats to keep her in England. In the end, he accepts that it is Vicky's wish to return to her birthplace with her father and new step-mother. Meanwhile, Vicky has been introduced to Jenny's horse, Black Beauty, and rides him regularly.

Nigel leaves ahead of Jenny and Vicky, so that he can prepare the farm for their arrival. News comes that his ship is late arriving to Singapore, and that wreckage was found. But some of the lifeboats were deployed, so there is still hope. Jenny and Vicky thus continue with their plans to return to the farm, arriving to find the former overseer has absconded with the livestock during Nigel and Vicky's two years in England, and the farm is almost a ruin.

But Jenny and Vicky are not deterred; and the stableboy and general hand, Manfred Groenwald, a young German immigrant, is still there and still willing to work. So, they set about making the farm ship-shape and Bristol fashion.

A letter arrives from England, from Jenny's father, to say that Black Beauty had died about a week after they left. The next night, a partly wild black horse appears from nowhere at the farm, with the same markings as Black Beauty – so that is what Vicky names him. And there the adventures truly begin, with Jenny's father coming to join them in New Zealand in the fourth episode.

As with the original 1970s series, the new series had the theme tune, "Galloping Home", written by Denis King and performed by the London String Chorale.

Series 2 (1992)

The second The New Adventures of Black Beauty is set in Australia and has no real connection with the characters (except for Beauty) and plot of the previous New Zealand production or with the original The Adventures of Black Beauty series.

Orphan Issabelle "Bella" Barret tries and fails to escape from the terrible conditions of an orphanage, after which she sets a mistreated black horse free. She makes a second, successful escape and stows away on the merchant vessel Astoria. During a storm, Astoria runs into a reef and breaks up. Bella is washed ashore to be rescued by a black horse. (Is it the same one she freed?) She and the horse are found by Doctor Austin. Her trauma has left Bella with amnesia, and she will only regain her memory slowly over time. All the while Bella and the horse are living on Doctor Austin's farm. Meanwhile, unsavory characters are about the land searching for gold that was supposedly lost aboard Astoria, and they soon realize Bella may be the key to their success.

As before, "Galloping Home" was the theme song for the series. In the United Kingdom, this series aired on the BBC between 1994 and 1998.

== Main cast ==
=== Series 1 (1990–1991) ===
- Dr Jenny Denning – Stacy Dorning (26 episodes)
- Manfred Groenwald – Gedeon Burkhard (26 episodes)
- Dr. James Gordon – William Lucas (26 episodes)
- Victoria 'Vicky' Denning – Amber McWilliams (26 episodes)
- Frank Coats – David Bradshaw (24 episodes)
- Hilda Burton – Ilona Rodgers (24 episodes)
- Samuel Burton – Bill Kerr (24 episodes)
- Isambard – Claire Chitham (9 episodes)
- Constable Carmody – Andrew Robertt (5 episodes)
- Lewis Duncan – Timothy Raby (3 episodes)
- Lord Fordham – Frederick Treves (2 episodes)
- Nigel – Christian Burgess (2 episodes)

=== Series 2 (1992) ===
- Isabela 'Bella' Barrett – Rebecca Gooden
- Doctor Austin – Peter Bensley
- Connie – Caroline Winnall
- Kathy – Tyler-Jane Mitchel (episode 4)
- Sergeant Pickles – Henry Salter
- Weeks – Nicholas Bell
- Walter – Peter Weiss
- Ted – Peter Evangelista
- Frank – Michael Burkett
- Anna Swallow – Celia De Burgh
- Potch – Edwin Hodgeman
- Rudy Swallow – Patrick Frost
- Mrs. Mac – Celine O'Leary
- Aunt Caroline – Jennifer Kent
- Richmond – Reg Gorman

== Episodes ==
=== Series 1 (UK, 1990–91) ===
(As aired in the UK; the series was dropped by the ITV network after its first seventeen episodes – shown on sixteen Saturdays after the first two were edited together – and the remaining nine were only shown piecemeal on a regional basis)

1. The Old World (1-Sep-1990)
2. A Horse Like Beauty (also 1-Sep-1990; shown in the UK in an hour-long special combined with episode 1 as 'That Old World Beauty')
3. Breaking In (8-Sep-1990)
4. Ride a Black Horse (15-Sep-1990)
5. Deceptive Appearances (22-Sep-1990)
6. Fear of Water (29-Oct-1990)
7. Treasure Hunt (6-Oct-1990)
8. The Birdman (13-Oct-1990)
9. Different Races (20-Oct-1990)
10. A Question of Justice (27-Oct-1990)
11. Horsepower (3-Nov-1990)
12. Horse Sense (10-Nov-1990)
13. Surprise (17-Nov-1990)
14. A Present for Beauty (24-Nov-1990)
15. The Sea Horses (1-Dec-1990)
16. Hope (8-Dec-1990)
17. At Risk (15-Dec-1990)
18. Greed Fever (ITV London region 9-May-1993)
19. The Poisoners (ITV London region 16-May-1993)
20. Bush Symphony (ITV London region probably 30-May-1993)
21. The Convicts (ITV London region probably 6-June-1993)
22. A Friend in Need (ITV London region probably 13-June-1993)
23. Out of Sight, Out of Mind (ITV London region 20-June-1993)
24. Deception (ITV London region probably 27-June-1993)
25. Call of the Wild (Part One) (ITV London region probably 4-July-1993)
26. Call of the Wild (Part Two) (ITV London region 18-July-1993)

=== Season 1 (US, 1990–91) ===
(As aired in the US in two seasons, per TV.com)

==== Season One ====
1. The Old World
2. A Horse Like Beauty
3. Breaking In
4. Ride a Black Horse
5. Deceptive Appearances
6. Fear of Water
7. Treasure Hunt
8. The Birdman
9. Different Races
10. A Question of Justice
11. Out of Sight, Out of Mind
12. Deception

==== Season Two ====
1. A Friend in Need
2. Surprise
3. A Present for Beauty
4. The Sea Horses
5. Hope
6. At Risk
7. Greed Fever
8. The Poisoners
9. Bush Symphony
10. The Convicts
11. Call of the Wild (Part One)
12. Call of the Wild (Part Two)

=== Specials ===
1. Horsepower
2. Horse Sense

=== Season 2 (1992) ===
1. The Fugitive
2. Recovery
3. Gymkhana
4. The Run Away
5. Horse Thief
6. Accident
7. Daylight Robbery
8. The Search
9. Hunted
10. The Imposter
11. The Detectives
12. Trespasser
13. Haunted House
14. The Race
15. Gold Fever
16. The Arrival
17. Bella Remembers
18. The Fair
19. Eureka
20. Bella's Dilemma
21. Sweet Reward
22. The Petition
23. Held to Ramsom
24. The Exchange
25. Captured
26. The Wedding

== Video releases ==
Questar, Gaiam Inc., Morningstar Entertainment, and perhaps others have released a number of one-episode and two-episode VHS volumes and sets, all of which appear to be limited to the New Zealand production.

Questar Entertainment released 24 of 26 episodes from the 1990–1991 production in a Region 1 six-DVD set, and billed as Series One and Two of the Treasured Series. The series split and episode order for these DVDs is as for the "US airing"(shown above), minus the two "Specials", which were omitted from this DVD release. Despite being split into two series, only the entire set was available for purchase.

DVD name	Ep#	Release date
The New Adventures of Black Beauty Series One and Two of the Treasured Series	24	29 June 2004

Umbrella Entertainment released the 1990–1991 production on DVD for Australia in Region 4 and Region 0, billed as "The New Adventures of Black Beauty – 4-Disk Set". As with the previous release, this set seems to present the New Zealand production as the entire series. However, in this case, there is no attempt to split the set into two "series", and no episodes were omitted.

DVD name	Ep#	Release date
The New Adventures of Black Beauty	26	10 March 2010

Image Entertainment released both productions on DVD in Region 1 as two series of the same programme. The Series 1 DVD set contains all 26 episodes of the 1990–1991 production, including the two omitted by Questar. The Series 2 DVD set contains all 26 episodes of the 1992 production.

DVD name	Ep#	Release date
The New Adventures of Black Beauty: Series 1	26	12 January 2010
The New Adventures of Black Beauty: Series 2	26	6 April 2010

In 2012 Madacy Entertainment and Image Entertainment released The Best of Black Beauty, a 10 disk Region 1 box set containing 42 episodes of The Adventures of Black Beauty and 44 episodes of The New Adventures of Black Beauty, with episodes from both the New Zealand and Australian productions.

Series	Ep#	Release date
The Best of Black Beauty	44, plus 42 more from the previous series	18 Sep 2012

The New Adventures of Black Beauty episodes included in The Best of Black Beauty are:

Series 1 (1990–1991) all episodes included
Disc 1: The Old World, A Horse Like Beauty, Breaking In, Ride a Black Horse, Deceptive Appearances, Fear of Water, Treasure Hunt, The Birdman
Disc 2: Different Races, A Question of Justice, Horsepower, Horse Sense, Surprise, A Present for Beauty, The Sea Horses, Hope
Disc 3: At Risk, Greed Fever, The Poisoners, Bush Symphony, The Convicts, A Friend in Need, Out of Sight Out of Mind, Deception, Call of the Wild (Part One), Call of the Wild

Series 2 (1992) 8 episodes omitted
Disc 4: The Fugitive, Recovery, Gymkhana, The Run Away, Horse Thief, Accident, Daylight Robbery, The Search
Disc 5: Bella Remembers, The Fair, Eureka, Bella's Dilemma, Sweet Reward, The Petition, Held to Ramsom, The Exchange, Captured, The Wedding

For the rest of the episodes in this set, see The Adventures of Black Beauty.

== See also ==
- Black Beauty, 1877 novel
- The New Adventures of Black Beauty available on the Retro Television Network
