= Who Is Killing the Great Chefs of Europe? =

1978 film by Ted Kotcheff

- Theatrical release poster
- Directed by: Ted Kotcheff
- Written by: Peter Stone
- Based on: Someone Is Killing the Great Chefs of Europe by: Nan Lyons; Ivan Lyons
- Produced by: William Aldrich
- Starring: George Segal; Jacqueline Bisset; Robert Morley; Jean-Pierre Cassel; Philippe Noiret; Jean Rochefort; Gigi Proietti; Stefano Satta Flores; Madge Ryan; Frank Windsor
- Cinematography: John Alcott
- Music by: Henry Mancini
- Production companies: Lorimar Productions; Aldrich Company; Geria Productions; Bavaria Films
- Distributed by: Warner Bros. Pictures
- Release date: October 6, 1978 (National Westwood Theatre)
- Running time: 111 minutes
- Countries: United States; West Germany
- Language: English
- Budget: $7 million
- Box office: $55.8 million

Who Is Killing the Great Chefs of Europe? (released in the UK as Too Many Chefs) is a 1978 black comedy mystery film directed by Ted Kotcheff and starring George Segal, Jacqueline Bisset and Robert Morley. It is based on the 1976 novel Someone Is Killing the Great Chefs of Europe by Nan and Ivan Lyons.

In the film, a gourmet magazine publishes an article on its owner's favorite chefs. Shortly after its publication, two of the featured chefs are murdered in ways reminiscent of their specialties. A female chef and her ex-husband find out the order of the planned killings, and attempt to prevent the next ones. The female chef knows that she is the last person on the killer's list.

== Plot ==
Natasha "Nat" O'Brien is a celebrated pastry chef invited to London to assist in preparing a state dinner for Elizabeth II, organized by culinary critic Maximillian "Max" Vandeveer. Natasha's ex-husband, Robert "Robby" Ross, is a fast-food entrepreneur ("the Taco King") serving the "everyman" consumer while she caters to the affluent. Max is the "calamitously fat" grand gourmand publisher of a gourmet magazine Epicurious and is the patron of several famous European chefs, each renowned for a signature dish.

When Natasha arrives, Max is gloating over his latest issue, featuring "the world's most fabulous meal," which highlights the culinary masterpieces of his favorite chefs. However, Max's health is failing from an addiction to those chefs' specialties. After completing the meal at Buckingham Palace, Natasha has a one-night fling with chef Louis Kohner whose specialty is baked pigeon in crust. The next morning, Natasha finds Louis dead in a 450° oven. After being questioned by Inspector Blodgett, Natasha and Robby depart for Venice, where Natasha is wooed by another chef, Fausto Zoppi, whose specialty is a lobster dish. However, when turning up for their date at his kitchen, Natasha finds Zoppi dead in a tank of lobsters.

After more questioning, this time by Venice police, Natasha receives a call from Robby to come to Paris to help prevent one member of a group of French chefs from being murdered. When they arrive, they hold a meeting discussing how Louis and Zoppi were killed and what to do next. Later that night, after a phone call from Max (who learns from his assistant Beecham that Natasha is no longer in Venice, but in Paris staying with Robby), Natasha puts together what Louis and Zoppi had in common – both made a dish featured in the aforementioned magazine article. It is now known that the next to be killed will be Jean-Claude Moulineau, whose specialty is pressed duck.

The disturbing fact is that the killings are following the order of a meal, so Natasha will be the last to be killed, her specialty being a dessert known as "Le' Bombe Richelieu." Robby tries to calm Natasha by suspecting Max as the killer, with the motive that he was the one who selected Natasha, Louis, Fausto and Jean-Claude to be in the magazine, but Natasha believes the killer is really Auguste Grandvilliers, with the motive that he was left off the list; however, when they attempt to call Moulineau to warn him, they receive a phone call from Grandvilliers that someone is at his restaurant. When they arrive, Robby and Natasha find Grandvilliers on a meat hook in the freezer, still alive.

Robby and Natasha begin falling in love again. After being questioned by police, Natasha and Robby learn from Inspector Salpetre that Moulineau was killed after being pushed headfirst into a duck-press. Back in London, Natasha is set to be a guest on A Moveable Feast. Robby initially decides to stay with her to keep her safe. However, Robby and Natasha learn from Max that Blodgett called Beecham to inform her that Grandvilliers confessed to the murders, so Robby can head to Brussels.

As he is heading to the airport, he is watching Natasha on TV and realizes that the cake that Natasha is set to light – the cake Robby poked three holes into like a bowling ball – was switched and now has a bomb inside it. He calls Blodgett to confront him about Grandvilliers's confession, only to learn no one confessed. That's when Robby once again suspects Max is the killer. He arrives at the TV studio and rescues her just in time as, 30–45 seconds later, the cake explodes on-air.

In the end, the killer turns out not to be Max who had realised who the culprit was after the studio attempt on Natasha, and called Beecham to meet him at a restaurant. After consuming a surfeit of food, he claims responsibility for the murders to Blodgett, before expiring. Beecham, distraught at his death, then confesses that she couldn't allow Max to be remembered as a murderer and it was she who had done it out of love and admiration for Max, and to protect him from the food he couldn't resist that was slowly killing him. As she cradles him, Max hiccups and revives.

In the final scene, Robby and Natasha get remarried.

== Cast ==
- George Segal as Robert Ross
- Jacqueline Bisset as Natasha O'Brien
- Robert Morley as Maximillian Vandeveer
- Jean-Pierre Cassel as Louis Kohner
- Philippe Noiret as Jean-Claude Moulineau
- Jean Rochefort as Auguste Grandvilliers
- Gigi Proietti as Ravello (as Luigi Proietti)
- Stefano Satta Flores as Fausto Zoppi
- Madge Ryan as Beecham
- Frank Windsor as Blodgett
- Peter Sallis as St. Claire
- Tim Barlow as Doyle
- John Le Mesurier as Dr. Deere
- Joss Ackland as Cantrell
- Jean Gaven as Salpetre
- Daniel Emilfork as Saint-Juste
- Jacques Marin as Massenet
- Jacques Balutin as Chappemain
- Jean Parédès as Brissac
- Michael Chow as Soong
- Anita Graham as Blonde
- Nicholas Ball as Skeffington
- David Cook as Bussingbill
- Nigel Havers as Counterman
- Caroline Langrishe as Loretta
- Kenneth Fortescue as Director
- Ronald Leigh-Hunt as Priest

== Release ==
The film was distributed by Warner Bros. Pictures and produced by Lorimar. Warner Communications acquired Lorimar in 1989 and now owns the rights to the film.

== Reception ==
The film received critical acclaim and currently has a fresh 77% rating on Rotten Tomatoes from 13 reviews. Roger Ebert called it "a light, silly entertainment with class."

Conversely, Stanley Kauffmann of The New Republic wrote: "Who ls Killing the Great Chefs of Europe? (Warner Bros.) is one more attempt to get fun out of homicide, an idea that sometimes succeeds but doesn't here because the script lacks focus, brightness, and pace, and the direction limps along after it".

== Awards ==
Morley won Best Supporting Actor at the 1978 Los Angeles Film Critics Association Awards (1978) and at the National Society of Film Critics Awards (1979). He was also nominated for a Golden Globe for Best Motion Picture Actor in a Supporting Role along with Bisset for Best Motion Picture Actress (1979).
