= Deena Freeman =

American actress

- Occupation: Actress
- Years active: 1975–present
- Known for: Too Close for Comfort
- Spouse: David Brandes (1988–present)
- Children: 2 daughters
- Website: www.deenafreeman.com

Deena Freeman is an American actress who has appeared in movies, television and commercials. Freeman is most remembered for her role as April, the niece of Henry Rush in the sitcom Too Close for Comfort (1981–1982).

== Early life ==
Along with appearing in high school stage productions, she became a regular member of the TheatreWorks acting company. She was a featured player in several productions, including Story Theatre (1975) and Ah, Wilderness! (1976) where she performed as Mildred Miller (with Željko Ivanek as her brother, Richard).

== Career ==
Her first television appearance was in the TV movie In Trouble, with Nancy Cartwright and Lisa Freeman, following which she was cast in Too Close For Comfort. She made appearances in several TV shows, including Newhart, The White Shadow, Crazy Like a Fox, and Bea Arthur’s daughter (one episode) on The Golden Girls.

Freeman appeared in numerous commercials, and was honored by the Screen Actors Guild for her body of commercial work. She did voice-overs for several cartoons and games, including Monsters, Inc. and The Incredibles.

== Personal life ==
She is married to producer David Brandes, and has two daughters, Aviva and Noa Brandes, who also are actresses. She founded her own acting studio for kids and teens in Los Angeles called Deena Freeman Kids and Teen acting studio.
