= A World of His Own (TV series) =

British TV comedy series (1964–1965)

- Genre: Sitcom
- Written by: Dave Freeman
- Starring: Roy Kinnear; Anne Cunningham
- Country of origin: United Kingdom
- Original language: English
- No. of series: 1
- No. of episodes: 13

Production
- Producers: David Croft; Graeme Muir
- Running time: 30 minutes
- Production company: BBC

Original release
- Network: BBC One
- Release: 31 July 1964 – 26 February 1965

A World of His Own is a British comedy television series which aired on the BBC in 13 episodes between 31 July 1964 and 26 February 1965. It was created as a vehicle for Roy Kinnear, who played an absent-minded dreamer named Stanley Blake. Anne Cunningham co-starred alongside him as his wife Helen.

== Bibliography ==
- Horace Newcomb. Encyclopedia of Television. Routledge, 2014.
