= The Adventures of Black Beauty =

British TV family adventure series (1972–1974)

- Genre: Adventure; Family drama
- Written by: Ted Willis (head writer); Richard Carpenter; David Butler
- Directed by: Charles Crichton; Peter Duffell; John Reardon
- Starring: Judi Bowker; William Lucas; Stacy Dorning; Roderick Shaw; Charlotte Mitchell; Michael Culver
- Theme music composer: Denis King
- Opening theme: Galloping Home
- Country of origin: United Kingdom
- Original language: English
- No. of series: 2
- No. of episodes: 52

Production
- Executive producer: Paul Knight
- Producer: Sidney Cole
- Production location: Hertfordshire, England
- Running time: 25 minutes
- Production companies: The Fremantle Corporation; London Weekend Television

Original release
- Network: ITV
- Release: 17 September 1972 – 10 March 1974

Related
- The New Adventures of Black Beauty

The Adventures of Black Beauty is a British adventure family television series produced by London Weekend Television and shown by ITV in the United Kingdom between 1972 and 1974. It was distributed internationally by London Weekend International.

The New Adventures of Black Beauty (1990–91) is a continuation of the 1970s series, and is set at the beginning of the 20th century, twenty years after the original series.

== Broadcast history ==
Two series were produced, the first airing from September 1972 to March 1973 and the second from September 1973 to March 1974. Although it was mainly aimed at children, it was shown in the Sunday teatime family timeslot and gained a wide audience, becoming popular enough to make the general Top 20 ratings. It was repeated regularly, although often on a regional basis, for many years, its last full repeat run being on Sunday mornings from 1986 to 1988 (a further repeat run was planned for the summer of 1990, but cancelled because of objections by Equity after repeat fees had not been re-negotiated). Having been shown in several major US markets when it was initially produced, it also aired in the United States on Nickelodeon in the 1980s. In July 2009, Retro Television Network picked up all 104 episodes of The Adventures of Black Beauty and The New Adventures of Black Beauty, and affiliates began airing the show, listing both shows as simply Black Beauty.

== Plot ==
The series was not an adaptation of the 1877 book by Anna Sewell, but rather a "continuation" featuring new characters created by Ted Willis, most prominently Dr James Gordon, played by William Lucas, and his children Vicky, played by Judi Bowker (who became Jenny, played by Stacy Dorning, in the second series) and Kevin, played by Roderick Shaw (at the beginning of the New Adventures it is mentioned that Kevin had gone to sea and become a midshipman). Supporting characters included Dr. Gordon's loyal housekeeper Amy Winthrop, played by Charlotte Mitchell, and a local boy, Albert Clifton, portrayed by Tony Maiden. Other writers for the series included David Butler and Richard Carpenter, while directors included Charles Crichton and Peter Duffell. The series was filmed mainly at Stockers Farm, Rickmansworth, Hertfordshire.

== Main cast ==
- Dr James Gordon – William Lucas (52 episodes, 1972–1974)
- Amy Winthrop – Charlotte Mitchell (52 episodes, 1972–1974)
- Kevin Gordon – Roderick Shaw (51 episodes, 1972–1974)
- Squire Armstrong – Michael Culver (31 episodes, 1972–1974)
- Vicky Gordon – Judi Bowker (26 episodes, 1972–1973)
- Jenny Gordon – Stacy Dorning (25 episodes, 1973–1974)
- Police Constable Dickins – Kenneth Thornett (16 episodes, 1972–1974)
- Albert Clifton – Tony Maiden (14 episodes, 1972–1974)
- Ned Lewis – Stephen Garlick (11 episodes, 1973–1974)

== Series overview ==
Series	Episodes	Originally released	
Series	Episodes	First released	Last released
1	26	17 September 1972	18 March 1973
2	26	23 September 1973	10 March 1974

== Episodes ==
Transmission dates given are for the network; they varied in London.

=== Series 1 (1972–73) ===
No. overall	No. in series	Title	Original release date
1	1	"The Fugitive"	17 September 1972
2	2	"The Hostage"	24 September 1972
3	3	"The Pit Pony"	1 October 1972
4	4	"The Horse Thieves"	8 October 1972
5	5	"Runaway"	15 October 1972
6	6	"Warhorse"	22 October 1972
7	7	"The Horsemen"	29 October 1972
8	8	"The Duel"	5 November 1972
9	9	"The Viking Helmet: Part 1"	12 November 1972
10	10	"The Viking Helmet: Part 2"	19 November 1972
11	11	"Day of Reckoning"	26 November 1972
12	12	"Man Trap"	3 December 1972
13	13	"Clown on Horseback"	10 December 1972
14	14	"Three Locks to Fortune"	17 December 1972
15	15	"The Recruiting Sergeant"	31 December 1972
16	16	"The Debt"	7 January 1973
17	17	"The Horse Healer"	14 January 1973
18	18	"The Witch"	21 January 1973
19	19	"The Ponies"	28 January 1973
20	20	"The Ruffians"	4 February 1973
21	21	"Two of a Kind"	11 February 1973
22	22	"Foul Play"	18 February 1973
23	23	"Sailor on a Horse"	25 February 1973
24	24	"Wild Justice"	4 March 1973
25	25	"The Barge"	11 March 1973
26	26	"Father and Son"	18 March 1973

=== Series 2 (1973–74) ===
No. overall	No. in series	Title	Original release date
27	1	"A Member of the Family: Part 1"	23 September 1973
28	2	"A Member of the Family: Part 2"	30 September 1973
29	3	"The Outcast"	7 October 1973
30	4	"Good Neighbours"	14 October 1973
31	5	"Mission of Mercy"	21 October 1973
32	6	"Battle of Wills"	28 October 1973
33	7	"The Medicine Man"	4 November 1973
34	8	"Out of the Night"	11 November 1973
35	9	"Panic"	18 November 1973
36	10	"The Challenge"	25 November 1973
37	11	"Pocket Money"	2 December 1973
38	12	"The Quarry"	9 December 1973
39	13	"Secret of Fear"	16 December 1973
40	14	"Lost: Part 1"	23 December 1973
41	15	"Lost: Part 2"	23 December 1973
42	16	"Lost Goddess"	30 December 1973
43	17	"Where's Jonah?"	6 January 1974
44	18	"A Long Hard Run"	13 January 1974
45	19	"The Horse Breaker"	20 January 1974
46	20	"The Last Round-Up"	27 January 1974
47	21	"Goodbye Beauty"	3 February 1974
48	22	"The Escape"	10 February 1974
49	23	"A Ribbon for Beauty"	17 February 1974
50	24	"The Last Charge"	24 February 1974
51	25	"Race Against Time"	3 March 1974
52	26	"Game of Chance"	10 March 1974

== Theme tune ==
The theme tune, "Galloping Home", was written by Denis King and performed by the London String Chorale. In 1973 it won the Ivor Novello Award for Best Theme Tune. It was also released as a single and peaked at number 31 in the UK charts in the week of 2 February 1974.

It was later used at the climax of the first series of Miranda, with Miranda Hart dreaming of running through a field as Black Beauty does in the series' title sequence. The theme tune was also featured in the series Brainiac: Science Abuse. It actually has lyrics by Dick Vosburgh, as revealed by Denis King at a memorial concert for Vosburgh in July 2007.

The theme was also used in 1975, in an episode of The Goodies called 'Scatty Safari', when the team release the main attraction of their Star Safari Park, Tony Blackburn, into the wild. It was also used in the final episode of the first series of BBC TV comedy I'm Alan Partridge. Alan exclaims "It's brilliant" upon hearing the piece when his PA Lynn puts it on the stereo; they then listen to it again when clearing up after Alan's unsuccessful leaving party. On disc 2 of the I'm Alan Partridge Series 1 DVD release, the theme music also plays on a loop over the menu, the background of which is a picture of Alan Partridge running through a field. The tune was also used as the opening theme of a Finnish comedy series, Studio Julmahuvi.

== Video releases ==
Over the years there have been a number of VHS video releases of episodes (both single episode and 2 episode volumes and both PAL and NTSC format) by The Fremantle Corporation (with London Weekend Television/Talbot TV), VCI, Video Gems., and WH Smith Video. Sony is often cited as the producer of videos released by The Fremantle Corporation, but it appears that the name Sony, the manufacturer of the cassette, was retained on the slip cases.

In 2001, Network entered the series tentatively into the DVD market with two "best of" DVDs, one for each season. A few days later, these DVDs were available as a two disc set. The DVDs were released as region 0, but being PAL format were not suitable for the North American market. (Note: They released "The Best of Series One" on VHS first on 11 Jun 2001. "The Best of Series Two" followed in VHS on 13 Aug 2001.)

Season/Series	Ep#	Release date	Episodes
The Adventures of Black Beauty - The Best of Series One	5	17 Sep 2001	"The Fugitive", "The Hostage", "'The Recruiting Sergeant", "Sailor on a Horse", "Father and Son"
The Adventures of Black Beauty - The Best of Series Two	6	17 Sep 2001	"Member of the Family Part 1", "Member of the Family Part 2", "The Medicine Man", "Out of the Night", "The Escape", and "Game of Chance"
The Adventures of Black Beauty: The Best of Series One & Two	11	24 Sep 2001	"The Fugitive", "The Hostage", "'The Recruiting Sergeant", "Sailor on a Horse", "Father and Son", "Member of the Family Part 1", "Member of the Family Part 2", "The Medicine Man", "Out of the Night", "The Escape", and "Game of Chance"

In 2007, Network offered the complete Season 1 as a 4 disc set in region 2. A few months later in 2008, Season 2 was released, also 4 discs and region 2. In 2009, these were combined and released as the complete series.

Season/Series	Ep#	Release date
The Adventures of Black Beauty - Series 1 - Complete	26	3 Sep 2007
The Adventures of Black Beauty - Series 2 - Complete	26	14 Apr 2008
The Adventures of Black Beauty - The Complete Series	52	5 Oct 2009

In 2008, Network released an anomalous offering of a DVD that included "The Recruiting Sergeant" (Season 1) and both parts of "Member of the Family" (Season 2), all of which had been part of their earlier "Best Of" DVDs. These were region 2 only.

Season/Series	Ep#	Release date	Episodes
The Adventures of Black Beauty - Two Episodes	3	12 Jun 2008	"The Recruiting Sergeant", "A Member of the Family Part 1", "A Member of the Family Part 2"

In 2009 Image Entertainment released first Season 1 and then Season 2 in Region 1. Each season was three discs.

Season/Series	Ep#	Release date
The Adventures of Black Beauty: Season 1	26	5 May 2009
The Adventures of Black Beauty: Season 2	26	4 August 2009

In 2012 Madacy Entertainment and Image Entertainment released The Best of Black Beauty a 10 disc Region 1 box set containing 42 episodes of The Adventures of Black Beauty and 44 episodes of The New Adventures of Black Beauty.

Season/Series	Ep#	Release date
The Best of Black Beauty	42, plus 44 more from the later series	18 Sep 2012

The Adventures of Black Beauty episodes included in The Best of Black Beauty are:

Season 1 - 1 episode omitted
Disc 1: The Fugitive, The Pit Pony, Man Trap, The Hostage, The Horse Thieves, Warhorse, Clown on Horseback
Disc 2: The Duel, The Viking Helmet (Part 1), The Viking Helmet (Part 2), The Barge, Day of Reckoning, The Horse Dealer, The Debt, Runaway, Three Lock to Fortune
Disc 3: Recruiting Sergeant, The Ruffians, The Witch, Two of a Kind, The Ponies, Father and Son, Wild Justice, Foul Play, Sailor on a Horse

Season 2 - 9 episodes omitted
Disc 4: A Member of the Family (Part 1), A Member of the Family (Part 2), The Outcast, Good Neighbours, Mission of Mercy, Battle of Wills, The Medicine Man, Out of the Night
Disc 5: A Long Hard Run, The Horse Breaker, The Last Roundup, Goodbye Beauty, The Escape, A Ribbon for Beauty, The Last Charge, Race against Time, Game of Chance

For the rest of the episodes in this box set, see The New Adventures of Black Beauty.
