= Full House (British TV series) =

- Genre: Sitcom
- Created by: Johnnie Mortimer and Brian Cooke.
- Starring: Christopher Strauli; Sabina Franklyn; Brian Capron; Natalie Forbes; Diana King; Joan Sanderson
- Theme music composer: Harry Stoneham
- Country of origin: United Kingdom
- Original language: English
- No. of series: 3
- No. of episodes: 20

Production
- Producer: Peter Frazer-Jones Series 1 Episode 2- Series 2 Episode 8. Mark Stuart Series 1 Episode 1. Anthony Parker Series 3.
- Running time: 30 minutes
- Production company: Thames Television

Original release
- Network: ITV
- Release: 7 January 1985 – 19 November 1986

Full House is a British sitcom which aired for three series from 7 January 1985 to 19 November 1986. It was the last sitcom to be jointly co-created by the sitcom writing team of Johnnie Mortimer and Brian Cooke, however, it was mainly written by Johnnie Mortimer, with Mortimer writing 12 episodes alone, along with a further 3 with Brian Cooke, while another veteran sitcom writer, Vince Powell, contributed another 4. Also 1 episode was written by Richard Everett.

It starred Christopher Strauli, Sabina Franklyn, Brian Capron and Natalie Forbes, with Diana King, who was later replaced by Joan Sanderson.

It was made by Thames Television for the ITV network.

== Plot ==
The show revolved around two young couples, the Hatfields and the McCoys. Paul Hatfield (played by Strauli) and his wife Marsha (played by Franklyn), married for three years, and up to then living with Paul's mother (played in the first two series by King and then by Sanderson in the third), finally find their ideal home. However, they are unable to meet the mortgage repayments, so they invite Murray McCoy (played by Capron) and his girlfriend Diana (played by Forbes), who are also in the same situation, to join them and move in with them, contributing to the payment of the house. In the final episode of the series, the McCoys are married, and they have a baby.

== Episodes ==
=== Series 1 (1985) ===
- 1.1. First Time Buyers (7 January 1985) Written by Johnnie Mortimer and Brian Cooke.
- 1.2. And Mother Came Too (14 January 1985) Written by Johnnie Mortimer.
- 1.3. Promises, Promises (21 January 1985) Written by Johnnie Mortimer.
- 1.4. It's Only Money (28 January 1985) Written by Johnnie Mortimer and Brian Cooke.
- 1.5. Little Secrets (4 February 1985) Written by Brian Cooke.
- 1.6. Such Sweet Sorrow (11 February 1985) Written by Johnnie Mortimer.

=== Series 2 (1985) ===
- 2.1. Baby Talk (16 October 1985) Written by Johnnie Mortimer.
- 2.2. Where There's A Will (23 October 1985) Written by Johnnie Mortimer.
- 2.3. Home Is Where The Art Is (30 October 1985) Written by Johnnie Mortimer.
- 2.4. It's A Steal (6 November 1985) Written by Johnnie Mortimer.
- 2.5. Semper Fidelis (13 November 1985) Written by Vince Powell.
- 2.6. TV Or Not TV (20 November 1985) Written by Vince Powell.
- 2.7. The Mating Game (27 November 1985) Written by Johnnie Mortimer.
- 2.8. May The Best Man Win (4 December 1985) Written by Johnnie Mortimer.

=== Series 3 (1986) ===
- 3.1. It's in the Book (15 October 1986) Written by Johnnie Mortimer.
- 3.2. All Work And No Play (22 October 1986) Written by Johnnie Mortimer.
- 3.3. The Facts of Life (29 October 1986) Written by Vince Powell.
- 3.4. Old Scores (5 November 1986) Written by Richard Everett.
- 3.5. If at First You Don't Succeed (12 November 1986) Written by Vince Powell.
- 3.6. And Baby Makes Five (19 November 1986) Written by Johnnie Mortimer.

== Production ==
In common with many other Thames sitcoms from the 1980s, the format of Full House was sold to the US, via the American producer Don L. Taffner, who had a close relationship with Thames and had distributed Thames programmes in the States in both format and syndication. Taffner sold the format to CBS, and his production company made a pilot entitled No Place Like Home, starring Jack Blessing and Susan Hess as the married couple and Rick Lohman and Molly Cheek as the unmarried couple. It aired on CBS on 6 September 1985, but it failed to develop into a full series.

However, the original British series did eventually air in the US in syndication, but by then the more famous American family sitcom also entitled Full House had premiered, so it was renamed Mixed Doubles in the US so as to avoid confusion.
