= Keep It in the Family (1980 TV series) =

1980 TV series

- Genre: Sitcom
- Created by: Brian Cooke
- Starring: Robert Gillespie; Pauline Yates; Stacy Dorning; Jenny Quayle; Sabina Franklyn; Glyn Houston
- Theme music composer: Trevor Bastow
- Country of origin: United Kingdom
- Original language: English
- No. of series: 5
- No. of episodes: 31

Production
- Producers: Mark Stuart; Robert Reed; Michael Mills
- Running time: 30 minutes
- Production company: Thames Television

Original release
- Network: ITV
- Release: 7 January 1980 – 19 October 1983

Keep It in the Family is a British comedy television show that aired for five series between 7 January 1980 and 19 October 1983. It was about a likeable and mischievous British cartoonist, Dudley Rush. Also featured were Dudley's wife, Muriel, and their two daughters, Jacqui and Susan. Dudley's literary agent, Duncan Thomas, was also featured.

It was made by Thames Television for the ITV network.

A remake of Keep It in the Family was produced in the United States under the title Too Close for Comfort, starring Ted Knight.

== Cast ==
- Robert Gillespie as Dudley Rush
- Pauline Yates as Muriel Rush (series 1 – 4)
- Jenny Quayle (series 1 & 2) and Sabina Franklyn (series 3 – 5) as Jacqui Rush
- Stacy Dorning as Susan Rush
- Glyn Houston as Duncan Thomas

== Plot ==
Dudley and Muriel Rush own and live in a multi-storey house, of which the basement has been converted into a flat. The basement flat had been rented from them and when the tenant dies, the former tenant's family arrive to carry off all his possessions.

Dudley and Muriel have two daughters, Jacqui (21 in episode 1) and Susan (17 in episode 1). Jacqui and Susan want to have the vacant downstairs flat for themselves, so they can escape from the parental home and from Dudley's obsessive gaze. Dudley wants to rent out to the flat to somebody else but his daughters' pleas win the day and the two girls move into the flat. Dudley's obsessive and possessive gaze, though, is still on them and he objects to the young men who, he notices, visit his daughters.

Dudley is a talented illustrator and he earns his living from drawing his cartoon strip "Barney – the Bionic Bulldog" which he does while holding a pencil in the paw of his ventriloquist lion glove puppet. Dudley draws the cartoon strip under protest for his literary agent Duncan Thomas, who sells Dudley's cartoon to newspapers. Dudley would rather do anything than draw the cartoon strip and he keeps procrastinating to such an extent that he keeps missing the deadline for his illustrations, much to the frustration of the long-suffering Duncan.

As well as objecting to Duncan trying to keep him to publishing deadlines, Dudley also jealously objects to Duncan's obvious approval of Dudley's wife, Muriel and he also objects to Duncan's eager consumption of Muriel's delicious cakes.

Dudley is also a compulsive practical joker, with his long-suffering agent, Duncan Thomas, usually being on the receiving end of such jokes.

== Episodes ==
=== Series 1 (1980) ===
All episodes written by Brian Cooke

1. Downs and Ups (7 January 1980)
2. One of Those Days (14 January 1980)
3. All Through the Night (21 January 1980)
4. The Non-Mechanical Man (28 January 1980)
5. Some Enchanted Evening (4 February 1980)
6. A Friend in Need (11 February 1980)

=== Series 2 (1980) ===
All episodes written by Brian Cooke

1. Phoney Business (1 September 1980)
2. Home Is Where the Heat Is (8 September 1980)
3. Games People Play (15 September 1980)
4. And Not a Drop to Drink (22 September 1980)
5. Smoke Without Fire (29 September 1980)
6. Takeaway Sunday (6 October 1980)
7. The Mouthtrap (13 October 1980)

=== Series 3 (1981) ===
1. Splitting Headaches (1 September 1981) - written by Brian Cooke
2. The Judas Goat (8 September 1981) - written by Brian Cooke
3. A Game of No Chance (22 September 1981) - written by David Barry
4. Matter over Mind (29 September 1981) - written by David Barry
5. A Matter of Principle (6 October 1981) - written by Alex Shearer
6. The Inferior Decorator (13 October 1981) - written by Brian Cooke

=== Series 4 (1982) ===
1. In the Camera Club (19 October 1982) - written by Dave and Greg Freeman.
2. The Longest Night (26 October 1982) - written by Dave and Greg Freeman.
3. Job References (2 November 1982) - written by Peter Learmouth
4. A Snap Decision (9 November 1982) - written by Peter Learmouth
5. Piano Blues (16 November 1982) - written by Dave and Greg Freeman.
6. Alien Friends (23 November 1982) - written by David Barry

=== Series 5 (1983) ===
All episodes written by Dave and Greg Freeman.

1. Too Many Cooks (7 September 1983)
2. Trouble Aloft (14 September 1983)
3. A Moving Affair (21 September 1983)
4. Room for One on Top (5 October 1983)
5. That Old Black Magic (12 October 1983)
6. A Touch of the Orient (19 October 1983)

== Home media ==
DVD	Year(s)	Release date
The Complete Series 1	1980	18 October 2010
The Complete Series 2	1980	27 June 2011
The Complete Series 3	1981	28 May 2012
The Complete Series 4	1982	18 February 2013
The Complete Series 5	1983	1 July 2013
The Complete Series 1 to 5	1980-1983	18 June 2018
