= Margo Johns =

British actress (1919–2009)

- Born: Jessie Margaret Johns; 25 February 1919; Romford, Essex, England
- Died: 28 September 2009 (aged 90); Barnes, London, England
- Occupation: Actress
- Years active: 1945-1964
- Spouse: William Franklyn (1952 - 1962) (divorced) (1 child)

Margo Johns (4 September 1919 – 29 September 2009) was a British actress. She was the first wife of actor William Franklyn, and mother of actress Sabina Franklyn.

Her film credits include Murder at the Windmill (1949), Konga (1961) and This Is My Street (1964), while her television credits include Dixon of Dock Green, Dangerman (1964), South Riding, No Hiding Place, Emergency - Ward 10, The Saint (episode Judith) and Yes Minister.
