= Just William (1977 TV series) =

British children's TV series (1977–1978)

- Starring: Adrian Dannatt
- Theme music composer: Denis King
- Country of origin: United Kingdom
- Original language: English
- No. of series: 2
- No. of episodes: 26

Production
- Executive producer: Stella Richman
- Producer: John Davies
- Cinematography: Derek Doe
- Editors: Guy Crump; Ray Helm; Tony Webb
- Running time: 30 min.
- Production company: London Weekend Television

Original release
- Network: ITV
- Release: 6 February 1977 – 22 January 1978

Just William is a British television series based on the Just William series of books by Richmal Crompton. It aired for two series, between 1977 and 1978, on ITV. The series starred child actors Adrian Dannatt as William and Bonnie Langford as Violet, as well as established film star Diana Dors as Mrs Bott.

== Cast ==
- Adrian Dannatt as William Brown
- Hugh Cross as Mr Brown
- Diana Fairfax as Mrs Brown
- Stacy Dorning as Ethel Brown
- Simon Chandler as Robert Brown
- Bonnie Langford as Violet Elizabeth Bott
- Michael McVey as Ginger
- Craig McFarlane as Henry
- Tim Rose as Douglas
- John Stratton as Mr Bott
- Diana Dors as Mrs Bott

== Episodes ==
=== Series One ===
1. "William and the Begging Letter"
2. "William the Great Actor"
3. "The Outlaws and the Tramp"
4. "The Sweet Little Girl in White"
5. "William and the Badminton Racket"
6. "A Little Interlude"
7. "William and the Prize Pig"
8. "William and the Wonderful Present"
9. "William the Matchmaker"
10. "Waste Paper Please"
11. "Only Just in Time"
12. "William and the Sleeping Major"
13. "William Clears the Slums"

=== Series Two ===
1. "William's Lucky Day"
2. "The Great Detective"
3. "Violet Elizabeth Wins"
4. "William Holds the Stage"
5. "William the Philanthropist"
6. "It All Began with the Typewriter"
7. "A Rescue Party"
8. "William Finds a Job"
9. "Parrots for Ethel"
10. "William's Worst Christmas"
11. "William at the Garden Party"
12. "Two Good Turns"
13. "Finding a School for William"
14. "William and the Tramp"

== Merchandise ==
Two annuals based on the series were published by World Distributors (Manchester) Ltd. for 1978 and 1979 (published in late 1977 and 1978 respectively). These consisted mainly of features, games and activities, with picture strip stories also included.

Both series of Just William have been released on DVD by Network. Series One (released 18 May 2009) and Series Two (released 24 September 2009) are available individually as 2-disc sets, and also packaged together as Just William: The Complete Series.
