= Sabina Franklyn =

British actress

- Born: Elizabeth Sabina Franklyn; 15 September 1954 (age 71); London, England
- Occupation: Actress
- Spouse: John Challis (m. 1987; div. 1988)

Elizabeth Sabina Franklyn (born 15 September 1954) is an English actress, and the daughter of William Franklyn and Margo Johns.

Franklyn attended the independent Queen's Gate School and acted on stage with repertory theatres before her television appearances.

She starred in the ITV sitcoms Keep It in the Family and Full House, and was also in the final episode of Fawlty Towers, as well as episodes of When the Boat Comes In, All Creatures Great and Small, Terry and June, and Boon. She has also guest-starred in the Doctor Who audio dramas, Bang-Bang-a-Boom! and Situation Vacant.

In November 2009, she played the role of Eve Wilson in Coronation Street.

She was married to actor John Challis for one year, which ended after Franklyn had an affair with fellow actor Roy Marsden.

== TV and filmography ==
Year	Title	Role	Notes
2022	Midsomer Murders	Elaine Bennet	Series 23, Episode 2: "The Debt of Lies"
2022	Doctors	Helen Parsons	Series 23, 2 episodes: "Entitlement Parts One & Two"
2018	My Dinner with Hervé	Katie's Mother	Television film
2015	Count Arthur Strong	Eileen	Series 2, Episode 2: "The Day the Clocks Went Back"
2010	Now Retired	Sylvia Horn	Short film
2010	Doctor Who: The Eighth Doctor Adventures	Wanda Rothman (voice)	Series 4, Episode 2: "Situation Vacant"
2010	Doctors	Una Phillips	Series 12, Episode 86: "Rock-a-Bye Baby"
2009–2010	Coronation Street	Eve Wilson	20 episodes
2001	Love in a Cold Climate	Second Twitterer	Mini-series, 2 episodes
2000	Hearts and Bones	Harriet	Episode: "There is a Light That Never Goes Out"
1992	Covington Cross	Brittany	Episode: "Blinded Passions"
1990	The Upper Hand	Zoe Trubshaw	Episode: "Who's Who"
1990	The Little and Large Show		Series 10, Episode 4
1989	Boon	Merrily Curtis	Episode: "Don't Buy from Me, Argentina"
1988	All Creatures Great and Small	Susan Vaughan	Episode: "...The Healing Touch"
1986	The Worst Witch	Miss Spellbinder	Television film
1985–1986	Full House	Marsha Hatfield	20 episodes
1985	Agatha Christie's Miss Marple: The Moving Finger	Joanna Burton	2 episodes
1983	Terry and June	Liz	Episode: "Thanks for the Memory"
1983	The Kenny Everett Television Show	Various	Series 2, Episode 4
1982	The Curious Case of Santa Claus	Barbara	Television film
1982	Kelly Monteith		Series 4, Episode 4
1981–1983	Keep It in the Family	Jacqui Rush	18 episodes
1981	Byron: A Personal Tour	Annabella Milbanke	Television film
1981	Mike Yarwood in Persons		Series 4, Episode 2
1981	When the Boat Comes In	Imogen Lorrimer	2 episodes; "Oh, My Charming Billy Boy" and "Friends, Romans, Countrymen"
1980	Strangers	Sophy	Episode: "You Can't Win Them All"
1980	Blakes 7	Chesil	Episode: "Moloch"
1980	Pride and Prejudice	Miss Jane Bennet	Mini-series, 5 episodes
1979	Kelly Monteith		Series 1, Episode 2
1979	Fawlty Towers	Quentina	Episode: "Basil the Rat"
1978	Return of the Saint	Linda	Episode: "Signal Stop"
1978	Happy Ever After	Beryl	Episode: "The More We Are Together"
1975	Anne of Avonlea	Philippa Gordon	Mini-series, 2 episodes
1974	Masquerade	Maid	Episode: "May We Come In?"
1960	The Big Day	Minor role (baby)	uncredited – real father, William Franklyn, played the fictional one.
