= Brian Cooke =

British writer (born 1937)

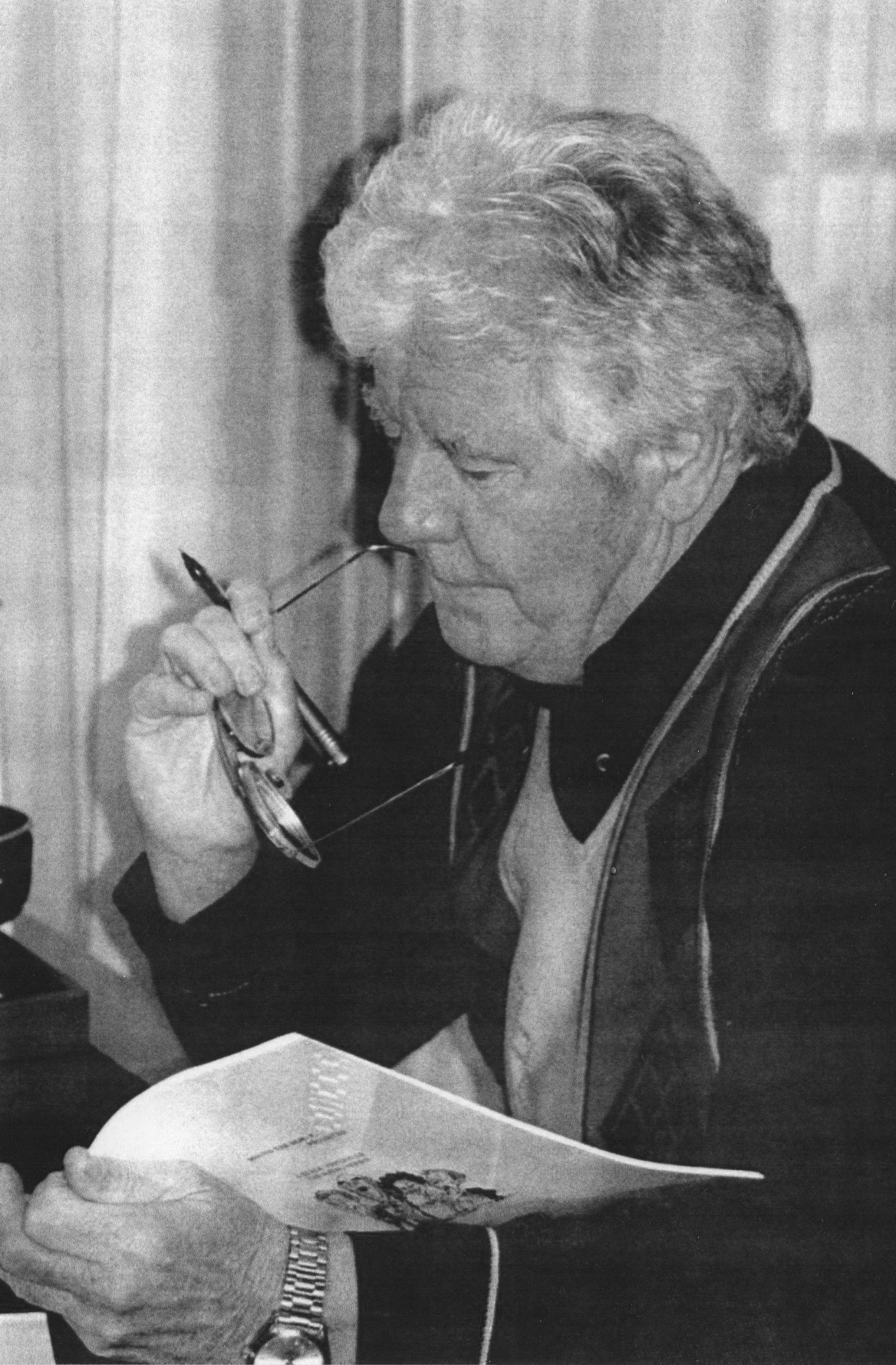
- Born: Brian Cooke; 1937 (age 88–89); Liverpool, Lancashire; England
- Occupation: Scriptwriter
- Writing career
- Period: 1968–1990
- Genre: Television sitcom
- Notable works: Father, Dear Father (1968–1973); Alcock and Gander (1972); Man About the House (1973–1976); George and Mildred (1976–1979); Robin's Nest (1977–1981); Keep It in the Family (1980-1983); Let There Be Love (1982–1983); Tom, Dick and Harriet (1982–1983); Tripper's Day (1984); Full House (1985–1986); Slinger's Day (1986–1987); Close to Home (1989–1990)

Brian Cooke (born 1937) is a British comedy writer who, with co-writer Johnnie Mortimer, penned scripts for and devised many top 1970s/80s television sitcoms, including Man About the House, George and Mildred, and Robin's Nest.

Cooke also wrote and created the 1980s TV sitcom Keep It in the Family, starring Robert Gillespie and the late-1960s/early-1970s sitcom Father, Dear Father starring Patrick Cargill. Man About the House, George and Mildred, Robin's Nest, and Keep It in the Family were remade for American television as Three's Company, The Ropers, Three's a Crowd and Too Close for Comfort.

== Early career ==
He was born in Liverpool, Lancashire (now Merseyside). Starting off as a cartoonist during his term of national service, he soon began to sell strips to magazines and newspapers. He met Johnnie Mortimer at a cartoonists convention. They also wrote the screenplays for the film version of the play No Sex Please, We're British, and the movie versions of their series Man About the House and Father Dear Father.

== Scriptwriter ==
Earlier in his career, Cooke was a writer for the last series of the 1960s radio series Round the Horne and its short-lived successor Stop Messing About. He had much success in 2003-5 when he revived the format for a theatre tribute show, Round the Horne ... Revisited, which ran in the West End for 15 months and spawned three national tours. In 2004, it was made into a television film, with the original London cast, by BBC Four. Stop Messing About was also turned into a stage play in 2009.
