= Ian Dickens =

Ian Dickens (born 1962, in Nottingham) is a former actor and is now a theatrical producer and director, the founder of Ian Dickens Productions.

In recent years Dickens has been directing a number of plays under the name ID Plays Limited touring three or four shows a year.

In 2009 Ian Dickens Productions took over the running of the Theatre Royal, Lincoln which then became the base for their touring productions. Dickens was the theatre's Artistic Director and CEO.

Ian Dickens is now believed to be living and working in Shanghai.
