= Donald L. Taffner =

American television producer

- Born: Donald L. Taffner; November 29, 1930; Brooklyn, New York, U.S.
- Died: September 6, 2011 (aged 80); Manhattan, New York, U.S.
- Education: St. John’s University
- Occupation: Producer
- Spouse: Eleanor Bolta
- Children: Donald Taffner Jr. Karen Butler

Donald L. Taffner (November 29, 1930 - September 6, 2011) was an American television producer. Taffner and his wife-business partner Eleanor Bolta were responsible for bringing to the U.S. such television shows as Three's Company, Too Close for Comfort and The Benny Hill Show.

== Biography ==
Taffner was born on November 29, 1930, in New York. He began working as a mail delivery agent for the William Morris Agency in 1952. Between 1955 and 1959, he served as an agent. He later worked at Paramount's New York office until, in 1963, he left the company to form DLT Entertainment (formerly D.L. Taffner Ltd.), a production company that began offering American series to international broadcasters.

In 1975, Taffner acquired from Thames Television the rights to the adaptation of the British series Man About the House (1973–1976), which was produced in the U.S as the title of Three's Company. Starring John Ritter, Suzanne Somers and Joyce DeWitt, the sitcom became a hit, produced between 1976 and 1984. The series spawned two spin-offs: The Ropers and Three's a Crowd. This second was actually the continuation of the original production, which at the time had already been canceled.

Trying to rescue the success of Three's Company, Taffner bought the adaptation rights to the British series Keep It in the Family (1980-1983) and produced Too Close for Comfort.

In 1987, D.L. Taffner, Ltd. acquired the exclusive rights to the Thames Television game show Whose Baby? and would remake the show for an American audience. That year, D.L. Taffner partnered with Muir Sutherland and his Celtic Films company to link for programming, based on The Saint. That year, Don Taffner had hired former Camelot Entertainment Sales employee Rick Levy to join the studio, in which he had served as president of sales and marketing.

After a few failed attempts, Taffner co-produced the British sitcom As Time Goes By in partnership with Theatre of Comedy Entertainment, and starring Judi Dench. The television series had 9 seasons, produced between 1992 and 2002, returning with specials in 2005.

== Legacy ==
DLT Entertainment is still in business, and continues to owns the U.S. rights to the aforementioned series. DLT Entertainment also holds the rights to Check it Out! and Talk About, both of which were produced in Canada. The latter series is the only DLT Entertainment property not based on a British series, although it would be adapted for British television in the early 1990s.
