= Tessa Wyatt =

British actress

- Born: 23 April 1948 (age 78); Woking, Surrey, England
- Occupation: Actress
- Years active: 1960–present
- Spouses: Tony Blackburn (m. 1972; div. 1977) Bill Harkness (m. 1986)
- Partner: Richard O'Sullivan (1978–1985)
- Children: 4

Tessa Wyatt is an English actress best known for her role as Vicky Tripp (née Nicholls) in the ITV sitcom Robin's Nest.

== Early life ==
Wyatt was born 23 April 1948, in Woking, Surrey, and attended Elmhurst Ballet School. She was encouraged to act by her maternal grandmother and got her first professional job at the age of 12, appearing in a television programme featuring Richard Hearne's character, Mr. Pastry. Soon after, she was represented by an agent.

== Career ==
Wyatt's early television appearances include parts in Z-Cars, The Wednesday Play, Tales of Unease, ('Suspicious Ignorance', episode), Public Eye, (in which she played a character with the surname Blackburn - she would marry Tony Blackburn in 1972), Callan, Dixon of Dock Green, Doctor at Large, Play for Today, and UFO. One of her first major roles was in a 1970 BBC serialisation of The Black Tulip, opposite Simon Ward.. Her film appearances include Wedding Night (1970), the cult horror film The Beast in the Cellar (1970) and Spy Story (1976). Wyatt claimed during a 2013 interview that while filming England Made Me (1973) opposite Peter Finch and Michael York, as a young actress alone abroad the "pervy director" Peter Duffell tried to coerce her into appearing nude.

From 1977 to 1981, Wyatt played Vicky Nicholls, later Tripp, in the ITV sitcom Robin's Nest. Her on-screen boyfriend Robin Tripp was played by Richard O'Sullivan. Following Robin's Nest, Wyatt appeared in Return of the Saint, Boon and 2point4 Children.

Wyatt was part of the original cast of the Channel Five soap opera Family Affairs, playing Samantha Cockerill. Since 2000, she has also appeared in Casualty and Doctors. She appeared in the fifth series of Peep Show as Jeremy's mother and was Tom's love interest in an episode of The Old Guys opposite Roger Lloyd-Pack and Clive Swift. In 2013, she joined the cast of EastEnders, playing Betty Spragg. She made a second appearance on the BBC series Doctors on 19 May 2015 alongside George Layton, another sitcom stalwart from the 1970s.

== Personal life ==
In 1972, Wyatt married radio DJ Tony Blackburn, with whom she had a son, Simon, born in 1973. Their romance became public knowledge after Blackburn began broadcasting cryptic messages after some of the records he played on air. The couple divorced in 1977.

For seven years from 1978, Wyatt was in a relationship with her Robin's Nest co-star Richard O'Sullivan with whom she has a son.

She married property developer Bill Harkness at Hammersmith register office in 1986; they have two children, and reside in Wimbledon.
