= Let There Be Love (TV series) =

- Genre: Sitcom
- Created by: Johnnie Mortimer; Brian Cooke
- Starring: Paul Eddington; Nanette Newman; Henry McGee; Stephen Nolan; Ian Morrison; Claudia Gambold; Elspeth March; John Welsh
- Country of origin: United Kingdom
- No. of series: 2
- No. of episodes: 12

Production
- Producer: Peter Frazer-Jones
- Running time: 30 minutes
- Production company: Thames Television

Original release
- Network: ITV
- Release: 4 January 1982 – 14 April 1983

Let There Be Love is a British sitcom which aired for two seasons from 1982 to 1983. It was created by the sitcom writing team of Johnnie Mortimer and Brian Cooke, and it starred Paul Eddington (who was also starring in the BBC's Yes Minister at the same time this sitcom went out), Nanette Newman and Henry McGee (who, likewise, also played straight man to Benny Hill at the same time).

It was made by Thames Television for the ITV network.

== Plot ==
Middle-aged and middle-class Timothy Love (played by Eddington) is a confirmed bachelor who is nonetheless happy with his marital status and his life; since he has a good job, plenty of money, the availability of girlfriends whenever he wants them, and cherished freedom. Until a mother-of-three, Judy (played by Newman) enters his life. Timothy will find Judy different to all the other women he has courted in the past; in contrast with all the others, Judy is the type of woman with which he feels he can 'settle down'. They become engaged, and Timothy's realising of the effort he has to do to change his life and do away with his old individualism will prove the main theme of the show.

Judy and Timothy are married at the end of the first series, and in the second Timothy has to adapt to step-fathering Judy's children Charles (played by Nolan), Edward (played by Morrison) and Elizabeth (played by Gambold), as well as come to terms with his parents-in-law (played by March and Welsh), as well as taking care of Judy's Alsatian dog. Another important character in the show is Timothy's business partner Dennis Newberry (played by McGee) in their advertising agency, and who would good-naturedly offer 'help' (i.e. hindrance) Timothy in adapting to his life with Judy.

== Episodes ==
=== Series 1 (1982) ===
- 1.1. Little Things Mean A Lot (4 January 1982)
- 1.2. Getting To Know You (11 January 1982)
- 1.3. Dad's The Word (18 January 1982)
- 1.4. Man And Superman (25 January 1982)
- 1.5. Your Place Or Mine (1 February 1982)
- 1.6. In Sickness And in Health (8 February 1982)

=== Series 2 (1983) ===
- 2.1. Crime And Punishment (10 March 1983)
- 2.2. Fool's Mate (17 March 1983)
- 2.3. Love in Bloom (24 March 1983)
- 2.4. If The Nightie Fits (31 March 1983)
- 2.5. Spilling The Beans (7 April 1983)
- 2.6. Love Me, Love My Dog (14 April 1983)
