= Dave Freeman (British writer) =

English writer (1922–2005)

- Born: David Freeman; 22 August 1922; Marylebone, London, United Kingdom
- Died: 28 March 2005 (aged 82)
- Occupations: Film and television screenwriter
- Notable work: The Benny Hill Show

David Freeman (22 August 1922 – 28 March 2005) was a British film and television writer, working chiefly in comedy.

He was one of the first generation of writers who established television, taking over from radio, as the most popular medium for comedy. His works were known for their usage of puns and double entendre.

During the small screen's Golden Age, he wrote scripts for comedians including Benny Hill, Tony Hancock, Ted Ray, Terry Scott, Spike Milligan, Eric Sykes, Peter Sellers, Charlie Drake, Arthur Askey, Sid James, Leslie Crowther, Roy Hudd, Jimmy Edwards, Tommy Cooper, Harry Worth and Frankie Howerd.

== Early life ==
Dave Freeman was born in Marylebone, London. He trained as an electrician before joining the Royal Naval Fleet Air Arm at the outbreak of the Second World War. His service with the Pacific fleet took him to Ceylon, India, South Africa, Kenya and finally Australia where he met and married his wife, Alberta. Upon his return to England in 1946, he joined the Metropolitan Police as a police constable in Paddington rising to a Special Branch detective at Scotland Yard.

After a period back at Special Branch, he became a journalist, then took a job as a security officer for the American Officers' Club in Regent's Park, London. One of his tasks was to book entertainment acts and when he struck up a friendship with Benny Hill, the pair started writing together.

== Career ==
=== Benny Hill ===
Freeman co-wrote with Benny Hill from 1954 to 1963 for The Benny Hill Show on BBC. The early series were notable for spoofs of popular television personalities of the time, such as the quiz and talent-show host Hughie Green, the globe-trotting journalist Alan Whicker, and the undersea explorers Hans and Lotte Hass.

Freeman was teamed with Hill from the second series, in 1957, and also appeared on screen when the star made one-off shows for ITV (1957–60) under a special contract with Bernard Delfont. He was later responsible for most of the scripts when Hill starred in three series of a BBC sitcom titled simply Benny Hill (1962–63), featuring the comedian in a different role each week in self-contained playlets.

=== Television, Film and Radio ===
Alongside his success with Benny Hill, he contributed to sketch-based programmes such as The Ted Ray Show (1955–59), and Great Scott – It's Maynard! (starring the comedy duo Terry Scott and Bill Maynard, 1955–56). In 1955 he joined Associated London Scripts, an agency representing the leading comedy and television writers of the 1950s and 1960s. There, he teamed up with John Junkin and Terry Nation to write two series for Elsie and Doris Waters, Gert and Daisy. He then went on to contribute sketches to Spike Milligan's The Idiot Weekly, Price 2d (1956) starring Peter Sellers, the first successful attempt to transform the comedy of The Goon Show from radio to television.

Television became Freeman's medium. Moving back and forth between BBC and ITV, Freeman wrote the sitcoms Charlie Drake in . . . (co-scripted with Charlie Drake, who played a different character each week, 1958–59) and both Arthur's Treasured Volumes (1960) and The Arthur Askey Show (1961).

He also created and wrote sitcoms for Roy Kinnear and Jimmy Edwards. In A World of His Own (1964–65), Kinnear played the daydreaming Stanley Blake, an outwardly ordinary husband lost in his own fantasies. The Fossett Saga (1969) was a spoof on The Forsyte Saga and starred Edwards as an author of penny-dreadfuls, bon viveur and patron of the arts in Victorian London.

Freeman wrote the fantasy serial Knock Three Times (1968), starring Hattie Jacques and based on the children's book by Marion St John Webb.

In 1967 he wrote the screenplay to Jules Verne's Rocket to the Moon. He also scripted episodes for The Avengers (1968) and It's Tommy Cooper (1970). Freeman wrote the fantasy serial Knock Three Times (1968), starring Hattie Jacques and based on the children's book by Marion St John Webb.

After contributing to "Carry On" television specials, Freeman also wrote the feature film Carry On Behind (1975) and Carry On Columbus (1992).

Much of his subsequent career was spent contributing episodes to some of television's most popular sitcoms, including Bless This House (1971–76), Robin's Nest (1977–81) and Keep It in the Family, writing nine episodes with his scriptwriter son Greg Freeman, between 1980 and 1983.

He wrote, too, for Terry and June (1979–87), which starred Terry Scott and June Whitfield as husband and wife, a pairing that had begun on the sketch show Scott On . . ., for which Freeman wrote the entire third and fourth series in 1970–71.

=== Theatre ===
A theatrical collaboration between Benny Hill and Freeman, Fine Fettle opened at the Palace Theatre in 1959. Freeman's stage farce A Bedfull of Foreigners opened at the Victoria Palace in 1973, starring Terry Scott and June Whitfield. In 1974, it transferred to the Duke of York's Theatre starring David Jason.

In 1982, Key for Two co-written with John Chapman was nominated for the Laurence Olivier Award for Best New Comedy after opening at the Vaudeville Theatre starring Moira Lister. His third play Kindly Keep It Covered opened in 1987 at the Churchill Theatre starring Terry Scott and Amanda Barrie.

All three plays have since been performed all over the world.

=== Commercials ===
Freeman wrote over 50 advertisements in a series of television commercials for the soft-drinks company Schweppes starring Benny Hill. The commercials became the first from Britain to win the Grand Prix de la Télévision at the 1961 Cannes International Festival of Publicity Films.

Following the success of the Schweppes adverts, Freeman was asked to write a series of television commercials for the Egg Marketing Board starring Tony Hancock and Patricia Hayes.

| Preceded by Talbot Rothwell | Carry On films scriptwriter 1975 | Succeeded by David Pursall; Jack Seddon |
| Preceded by Lance Peters | Carry On films scriptwriter 1992 | Succeeded by Final (to date) |
