= Marion St John Webb =

Marion St John Adcock Webb (5 December 1888 – 2 May 1930) was an English writer of novels and poetry for children that presaged A. A. Milne, with her character "The Littlest One".

== Life ==
She was born in Hampstead on 5 December 1888, the daughter of the poet Arthur St John Adcock and Marlon Louise Taylor. She grew up at 42 Paddington Street and was admitted to St Marylebone School in Marylebone in January 1894, having just turned 5 years old.

Webb wrote poems for a series of fairy books illustrated by Margaret Tarrant, with whom she worked on around 20 books. The treatment of childhood by Tarrant and Webb is now regarded as sentimentalised, typical of its time. She had no children of her own, She died 2 May 1930 in London.

Her work is also considered ahead of its time with entries into fantasy parallel worlds, depictions of strong female leads, and includes intense characterisations of people considered on the margins of society. Good copies of Little Round House change hands for hundreds of pounds in the specialist book trade.

== Partial bibliography ==
- Mr Papingay's Flying Shop
- Mr Papingay's Ship
- Mr Papingay's Caravan
- Mr Papingay and the Little Round House
- The Little Round House
- The Little One In Between
- Eliz'beth, Phil and Me
- The Littlest One
- The Littlest One Again
- The Littlest One: His Book
- The Littlest One: Third Book
- John, Me and the Dickery Dog
- The Magic Lamplighter
- The House with the Twisting Passage
- Knock Three Times! (1917, fantasy novel, illustrated by Tarrant, repub. 1994 by Wordsworth Editions Ltd, reprint. 2007)
- A Pocketful of Posies
- The Littlest Fairy
- The Girls of Chequertrees
- Adventures at Chequertrees
- Jonathan Mends the Mats
- The 'Normous Sunday Story Book

=== Fairies series ===
- The Pond Fairies
- Heath Fairies
- Seashore Fairies
- Weather Fairies
- Wild Fruit Fairies
- Twilight Fairies
- Orchard Fairies
- Forest Fairies
- Flower Fairies
- Insect Fairies
- Seed Fairies
- House Fairies
- Water Fairies
