= Johnnie Mortimer =

British television scriptwriter (1931–1992)

- Born: John Edward Mortimer; 2 July 1930; Clare, Suffolk, England
- Died: 2 September 1992 (aged 62); Molesey, Surrey, England
- Occupation: Scriptwriter
- Spouse: Jytte Mortimer
- Children: 1
- Writing career
- Period: 1968–1988
- Genre: Television
- Notable works: Father, Dear Father (1968–1973); Alcock and Gander (1972); Man About the House (1973–1976); George and Mildred (1976–1979); Robin's Nest (1977–1981); Let There Be Love (1982–1983); Tom, Dick and Harriet (1982–1983); Never the Twain (1981-1991); Full House (1985–1986)

John Edward Mortimer (2 July 1930 – 2 September 1992) was a British scriptwriter for British TV whose work, along with creative writing partner Brian Cooke, also served as inspiration for American television projects.

== Career ==
John Edward Mortimer was born in Clare, Suffolk, in 1930. He started out as a cartoonist, which brought him into contact with his writing partner Brian Cooke. Mortimer later wrote series for radio such as The Men from the Ministry and Round the Horne, before writing many TV situation comedies including Foreign Affairs, Father, Dear Father, Man About the House, Never the Twain, Robin's Nest and George and Mildred, often working in partnership with Cooke. Versions of Man about the House, George & Mildred and Robin's Nest were later adapted as Three's Company, The Ropers and Three's A Crowd respectively.

The partnership also wrote two plays, the first a theatrical version of George and Mildred (later renamed When the Cat's Away after the death of actress Yootha Joyce who played Mildred). The second was Situation Comedy, and featured two TV situation comedy writers struggling to come up with an idea for a new series (in the end, they write a stage play instead).

== Personal life and death ==
Mortimer and his wife, Jytte, had a son.

Mortimer lived in East Molesey, Surrey, and died there on 2 September 1992, at the age of 62, leaving an estate worth £1.2 million.
