= Greg Freeman (playwright) =

British playwright

Greg Freeman is an English playwright and television writer.

He is known for his critically acclaimed absurd and satirical plays, prompting Time Out London to dub him "batshit mental king of the dark fringe".

Freeman's notable works include Doig the Musical: With No Singing, No Dancing and Very Little Music, Beak Street, No Picnic and Dogstar.

In 2013, he and Lila Whelan were commissioned by Tacit Theatre to adapt Arthur Conan Doyle's A Study in Scarlet for the stage. It premiered at Southwark Playhouse in 2014.

Freeman also successfully adapted the US sitcom Who's the Boss? for British television; it was renamed The Upper Hand and ran for seven seasons.

He is the son of Dave Freeman.

== Works ==
=== Theatre ===
- 1999: Take - Old Red Lion, 1999
- 2003: Kathmandu - The Menier Chocolate Factory, 2003
- 2006: Spite The Face - Baby Belly Edinburgh, 2006
- 2007: Wake Up And Smell The Coffee - New End Theatre, 2007
- 2009: Doig the Musical: With No Singing, No Dancing and Very Little Music - Tabard Theatre, 2009
- 2010: Beak Street - Tabard Theatre, 2010
- 2012: No Picnic - Tabard Theatre, 2012
- 2013: Dogstar - Tabard Theatre, 2013
- 2014: A Study in Scarlet - The Southwark Playhouse, 2014
- 2015: The Ballad of Robin Hood - The Southwark Playhouse, 2015
- 2015: Empty Vessels - Rosemary Branch, 2015
- 2016: Sherlock Holmes and The Invisible Thing - Tabard Theatre, 2016
- 2017: Montagu - Tabard Theatre, 2017

== Sources ==
- Greg Freeman at IMDb
