= List of Danger Man episodes =

The following is a list of episodes of the British television series Danger Man.

== Series overview ==
Series	Episodes	Originally released	
Series	Episodes	First released	Last released
1	39	11 September 1960	20 January 1962
2	22	13 October 1964	16 March 1965
3	23	30 September 1965	7 April 1966
4	2	5 January 1968	12 January 1968

== Episodes ==
Episodes were usually not aired in production order. Broadcast order varied widely between the UK and US. In fact, CBS, the US broadcaster, used it only as a summer replacement for Wanted: Dead or Alive and did not air even half of the run.

Although aired over the course of 18 months, the first 39 episodes are considered one series.

=== Series 1 (1960–62) ===
Airdate is for ATV London ITV regions varied date and order.

No. overall	No. in series	Title	Directed by	Written by	Original release date	Prod. code
1	1	"View from the Villa"	Terry Bishop	Brian Clemens & Ralph Smart	11 September 1960	002
Guest cast: Barbara Shelley, Delphi Lawrence ... John Lee, Colin Douglas, Philip Latham, Court Benson, Andreas Malandrinos, Charles Houston, Raymond Young, Marie Burke Drake travels to Italy to investigate the murder of American banker Frank Delroy, who was suspected of embezzling five million dollars' worth of gold.
2	2	"Time to Kill"	Ralph Smart	Brian Clemens & Ian Stuart Black	18 September 1960	004
Guest cast: ... Sarah Lawson ... Lionel Murton, Derren Nesbitt, Carl Jaffe, Louise Collins, Anthony Jacobs, Endre Muller, Edward Hardwicke, Harvey Hall Drake balks when he is ordered to kill an assassin and intends to capture him. His plans are thwarted by an interfering Swedish school teacher.
3	3	"Josetta"	Michael Truman	Ralph Smart	25 September 1960	028
Guest cast: Kenneth Haigh, Julia Arnall ... Campbell Singer, Randal Kinkead, Clare Gordon, Glenn Beck, Robert Bernal, Cecil Brock, Anthony Viccars, Michael Graham Drake helps a blind woman find and identify her brother's killer.
4	4	"The Blue Veil"	Charles Frend	Don Inglis & Ralph Smart	2 October 1960	016
Guest cast: Laurence Naismith ... Lisa Gastoni ... Ferdy Mayne, Joseph Cuby, Peter Thornton Drake flies to the Arabian desert to investigate stories of slavery and helps a stranded showgirl.
5	5	"The Lovers"	Peter Graham Scott	Jo Eisinger & Doreen Montgomery	9 October 1960	017
Guest cast: Maxine Audley ... Martin Miller, Michael Ripper, Ewen Solon, Carl Bernard, Hermione Gregory Drake has a surprise when he receives a telephone call from an old enemy named Miguel Torres. Torres asks for Drake's help in preventing an assassination.
6	6	"The Girl in Pink Pyjamas"	Peter Graham Scott	St : Brian Clemens; Sc : Ian Stuart Black & Ralph Smart	16 October 1960	012
Guest cast: Angela Brown, John Crawford, Alan Tilvern ... Robert Raglan, Richard Warner, Robert Cawdron, Colette Wilde, Frederick Schiller, Harvey Hall, Richard Marner, Janine Gray A young woman is found wandering in a dazed condition along a lonely road in a Balkan state. She provides Drake with a clue to the mystery surrounding the attempted assassination of the country’s president.
7	7	"Position of Trust"	Ralph Smart	St : Ralph Smart; Sc : Jo Eisinger	23 October 1960	007
Guest cast: Donald Pleasence, Lois Maxwell ... John Phillips, Gilbert Winfield, Irene Prador, Martin Benson, Madeleine Kasket, Derek Godfrey, Derrick Sherwin Drake travels to a Middle East country to find how opium is supplied to criminal syndicates.
8	8	"The Lonely Chair"	Charles Frend	John Roddick & Ralph Smart	30 October 1960	025
Guest cast: Hazel Court, Sam Wanamaker, Richard Wattis ... Patrick Troughton, Howard Pays, Jack Melford, Alexander Archdale, Robert Harbin, Dorothy Hersee, Clifford Earl, Liz Lanchbury Drake impersonates a wealthy industrialist whose daughter has been kidnapped.
9	9	"The Sanctuary"	Charles Frend	John Roddick & Ralph Smart	6 November 1960	018
Guest cast: Kieron Moore ... Wendy Williams, Barry Keegan, Charles Farrell, Shay Gorman, John Rae, Ewen MacDuff, Peter Murray To uncover an IRA cell Drake impersonates a prisoner who has just been released after serving a sentence for a violent bomb outrage. His deception lands him into a web of drama and danger.
10	10	"An Affair of State"	Peter Graham Scott	Oscar Brodny	13 November 1960	009
Guest cast: Patrick Wymark, John Le Mesurier ... Dorothy White, Warren Mitchell, Alan Gifford, Victor Baring, Michael Hitchman, Andre Charise, Anthony Viccars, Fenella Fielding Drake flies to a small Caribbean state when an American economics expert, sent there to check on the country’s finances and gold reserves before America agrees to a large loan, is reported to have committed suicide.
11	11	"The Key"	Seth Holt	St : Ralph Smart; Sc : Jack Whittingham	20 November 1960	001
Guest cast: Robert Flemyng, Monique Ahrens ... Charles Carson, Charles Gray, Peter Swanwick, Charles Lloyd Pack, Martin Sterndale Drake loses no time in getting to know Logan and his attractive Continental wife, Maria. He tells Logan that he has been ordered to contact him with instructions to encode a message for cabling to Washington.
12	12	"The Sisters"	Seth Holt	St : Brian Clemens; Sc : Jo Eisinger	27 November 1960	008
Guest cast: Mai Zetterling, Barbara Murray, Richard Wattis ... Sydney Tafler ... Anthony Dawson, Martin Wyldeck, Hedger Wallace, Michael Hunt, Michael Jacques, Antonia Gilpin, Margo Mayne Which girl is telling the truth? This is the problem that faces Drake when a refugee from a mid-European country flees to England and pleads for political asylum.
13	13	"The Prisoner"	Terry Bishop	Ralph Smart & Robert Stewart	4 December 1960	024
Guest cast: William Sylvester ... June Thorburn, William Lucas ... Michael Peake, Keith Goodman, John Slavid A U.S. Diplomat has been forced to live within the walls of his embassy for five years, denied egress by the host country. Drake convinces a concert pianist to impersonate the diplomat, in an attempt to win his freedom.
14	14	"The Traitor"	Terry Bishop	John Roddick	11 December 1960	014
Guest cast: Ronald Howard, Barbara Shelley ... Jack Watling, Warren Mitchell, Derek Sydney, George A. Cooper, Guy Deghy What makes a man a traitor? Drake finds out when his latest assignment takes him to Kashmir, in Northern India, and to drama high up a mountain in a lonely bungalow with a renegade Englishman and his beautiful wife.
15	15	"Colonel Rodriguez"	Julian Amyes	Ralph Smart	18 December 1960	021
Guest cast: Noel Willman, Maxine Audley ... Honor Blackman, Ronald Allen, Campbell Singer, Cyril Shaps, Pearl Prescod, Neville Becker, Lloyd Reckord, Brian Jackson The treacherous Colonel Rodriguez has arrested an innocent American journalist on charges of spying. Drake must find a means of freeing him.
16	16	"The Island"	Pennington Richards	Brian Clemens & Ralph Smart	1 January 1961	029
Guest cast: Allan Cuthbertson, Peter Stephens ... Ann Firbank, Michael Ripper, Ronan O'Casey, Richard Thorp, Charles Irwin, Nyree Dawn Porter Drake, an heiress, and two assassins are stranded on a small island after a plane crash. The assassins and Drake strive to convince the sole inhabitant on the island the truth about who is a prisoner and who is a guard.
17	17	"Find and Return"	Seth Holt	Jo Eisinger	8 January 1961	003
Guest cast: Moira Lister, Donald Pleasence, Richard Wattis ... Paul Stassino, Zena Marshall, Warren Mitchell, Keith Rawlings, Frank Thornton, Nancy Seabrook A woman is wanted by the British authorities on charges of espionage. Drake travels to the Middle East to find her and retrieve her passport.
18	18	"The Girl Who Liked G.I.'s"	Michael Truman	Marc Brandel & Ralph Smart	15 January 1961	034
Guest cast: Anna Gaylor, Anthony Bushell ... Nigel Green, Paul Maxwell, Charles Farrell, Garydon Gould, Bill Edwards, Rudolf Offenbach, Betty Le Beau In Munich, Drake investigates the murder of a G.I. and makes a date with his German girlfriend. Is she an innocent or a spy?
19	19	"Name, Date and Place"	Charles Frend	Ralph Smart & John Roddick	22 January 1961	031
Guest cast: Cyril Raymond, Richard Wattis ... Kathleen Byron, Patricia Marmont, Jean Marsh, Susan Travers, Delena Kidd, Olive McFarland, Guy Deghy, Frederick Piper Does a "Murder Incorporated" organisation exist? Drake arranges his own murder.
20	20	"Vacation"	Patrick McGoohan	Ralph Smart	29 January 1961	037
Guest cast: Hugh McDermott, Esmond Knight ... Jacqueline Ellis, Barrie Ingham, Lawrence Davidson, John Wynyard, Richard Clarke, Charles Lloyd-Pack Travelling to Nice, Drake sits next to a man he recognises as an assassin. Drake takes his place, but who is the victim?
21	21	"The Conspirators"	Michael Truman	Ralph Smart & John Roddick	5 February 1961	030
Guest cast: Patricia Driscoll, Terence Longdon ... Hugh Moxey, Alfred Burke, Percy Herbert, Rory McDermot, Neil McCarthy, Michael Sands, Ian Ellis, Timothy Benke Drake is sent to a remote island to protect the wife of a murdered diplomat who is writing a book exposing the truth.
22	22	"The Honeymooners"	Charles Frend	Ralph Smart & Lewis Davidson	2 April 1961	033
Guest cast: Lee Montague, Ronald Allen, Sally Bazely ... Michael Peake, Kerrigan Prescott, Sheldon Lawrence, Anthony Chin, Eric Young, Myo Toon, Barbara Lee, Jimmy Fung A groom accused of murder and awaiting execution in the Far East is a pawn in a power struggle between the country's Prime Minister and Defence Minister. All is not what it seems.
23	23	"The Gallows Tree"	Michael Truman	Ralph Smart & Marc Brandel	9 April 1961	036
Guest cast: Paul Rogers, Wendy Craig, Raymond Huntley ... Ewan Roberts, Andrew Crawford, John Glyn-Jones, John Rae, Reginald Hearne, Gareth Tandy, Michael Bird, Finlay Currie In Scotland, a stolen car is recovered bearing the fingerprints of long dead masterspy. Is he still alive and working?
24	24	"The Relaxed Informer"	Anthony Bushell	Ralph Smart & Robert Stewart	16 April 1961	022
Guest cast: Duncan Lamont, Moira Redmond ... Paul Maxwell, Brian Rawlinson, Stanley Van Beers, Tom Gill, Pauline Letts, Henri Vidon, Charles Vance In Bavaria, Drake intercepts an enemy courier. Who is supplying the secrets? What is the connection to an isolated religious sect?
25	25	"The Brothers"	Charles Frend	Ralph Smart	23 April 1961	020
Guest cast: Lisa Gastoni, George Coulouris ... Ronald Fraser, Derren Nesbitt, John Woodvine, Nancy Beckh, Gino Melvazzi, Rodney Burice, Wesley Murphy A diplomatic satchel is stolen by bandits when a plane crashes off the coast of Sicily. Drake must deal with the bandits to retrieve the satchel.
26	26	"The Journey Ends Halfway"	Clive Donner	Ian Stuart Black	30 April 1961	006
Guest cast: Paul Daneman, Willoughby Goddard, Anna May Wong ... Paul Hardtmuth, Martin Boddey, Burt Kwouk, R. Bobby Naidoo, Eric Young, Gerry Lee, Anthony Chin, Lian-Shin Yang Drake uses the guise of a Czech engineer to find out who is betraying people trying to escape from Communist China.
27	27	"Bury the Dead"	Clive Donner	St : Brian Clemens; Sc : Ralph Smart	7 May 1961	011
Guest cast: Beverly Garland ... Dermot Walsh, Paul Stassino, Patrick Troughton, George Murcell, George Eugeniou and Robert Shaw In Sicily, Drake finds out the truth about the death of another agent who was investigating a gun-running operation.
28	28	"Sabotage"	Peter Graham Scott	Michael Pertwee & Ian Stuart Black	14 May 1961	013
Guest cast: Maggie Fitzgibbon, Yvonne Romain ... Oliver Burt, Alex Scott, R. Bobby Naidoo, Lyn Ashley, Jimmy Fung, John Sterland, Peter Dolphin A transport plane flying over South East Asia explodes. Drake helps the widow of the pilot find the cause of the tragedy.
29	29	"The Contessa"	Terry Bishop	John Roddick & Ralph Smart	21 May 1961	027
Guest cast: Hazel Court ... John Wyse, Lionel Murton ... Ralph Truman, Bill Nagy, Jennifer Jayne, Irene Prador, Dudley Foster, Edward Cast, Jackie Collins, Glenn Beck Drake works undercover as a seaman to infiltrate a drug smuggling operation in Italy.
30	30	"The Leak"	Anthony Bushell	Ralph Smart & Brian Clemens	28 May 1961	032
Guest cast: Zena Marshall, Bernard Archard, Marne Maitland ... Anthony Dawson, Lawrence Davidson, Walter Gotell, William Peacock, Barry Shawzin, Patsy Smart, Joseph Cuby, Eric Pohlmann Drake travels to the Middle East to find out why people near a nuclear plant are showing signs of radiation poisoning.
31	31	"The Trap"	Pennington Richards	Ralph Smart & John Roddick	4 June 1961	038
Guest cast: Jeanne Moody, Noel Trevarthen, Marie Burke ... Alan Gifford, Louise Collins, Georgina Cookson, Victor Rietti, Miki Iveria, John Bonney, Patrick Maynard, Graham Stewart A woman working as a cipher clerk at the American embassy in London travels to Italy with her new fiancé. Drake follows to find out whether it is true love.
32	32	"The Actor"	Michael Truman	Marc Brandel	11 June 1961	039
Guest cast: Rupert Davies, Gary Cockrell ... Julie Allan, Patsy Rowlands, Burt Kwouk, Andy Ho, Eric Young, Sam Chowdhary, Chin-Yu, Soo Bee Lee A Hong Kong radio station is embedding secrets in its broadcasts. Drake gets a job there to find out who is the spy.
33	33	"Hired Assassin"	Charles Frend	Ralph Smart & John Roddick	18 June 1961	035
Guest cast: Alan Wheatley, Cyril Shaps, Nyall Florenz ... Judy Carne, Wensley Pithey, Bill Nagy, Harry Lockart, J. Leslie Frith, Charles Hill, Frank Thornton, Camilla Hasse Drake infiltrates a terrorist group planning to kill a Latin American president.
34	34	"The Deputy Coyannis Story"	Peter Graham Scott	Jo Eisinger	16 December 1961	019
Guest cast: John Phillips, Charles Gray ... Heather Chasen, Liam Gaffney, Stuart Hutchinson, Peter Welch, Julie Hopkins, Robert Raglan, Leonard Sachs, Bartlett Mullins Drake is sent to a Balkan country to find out if aid money is being stolen.
35	35	"Find and Destroy"	Charles Frend	Ralph Smart & John Roddick	23 December 1961	023
Guest cast: Peter Arne ... Nadja Regin ... Peter Sallis, Helen Horton, Ronald Leigh-Hunt, Alec Mango, Richard Clarke, Brad Dancy, Rebecca Dignam A miniature submarine is beached on the coast of South America. Drake has to destroy it before enemy agents can discover its secrets.
36	36	"Under the Lake"	Seth Holt	Jack Whittingham	30 December 1961	005
Guest cast: Christopher Rhodes, Hermione Baddeley ... Moira Redmond, Lionel Murton, Roger Delgado, Walter Gotell, Norman Florence, Jack Cunningham, Andrew Downie, Reginald Jessup A counterfeit operation is circulating US dollars. Drake follows a man and his daughter to find the source of the fake money. (N.B. The episode opens with the mention "Zurich" but with a view of Brussels' townhall.)
37	37	"The Nurse"	Peter Graham Scott	Ralph Smart & Brian Clemens	6 January 1962	015
Guest cast: Eileen Moore, Jack MacGowran, Eric Pohlman ... Robert Ayres, Heather Chasen, Harold Kasket, Harry Lockart, David Oxley, Andrew Faulds, Maxwell Shaw, Harold Siddons Drake helps a pretty Scots nurse protect the heir to the throne of a Middle East country.
38	38	"Dead Man Walks"	Charles Frend	Ralph Smart & Brian Clemens	13 January 1962	026
Guest cast: Richard Wattis, Marla Landi, Julia Arnall ... Richard Pearson, Michael Ripper, Bryan Coleman, Joanna Dunham, William Peacock and Zia Mohyeddin A group of scientists researching bacterial warfare made a dramatic discovery. Now they are being killed. Drake travels to Kashmir to find out why.
39	39	"Deadline"	Peter Graham Scott	St : Ian Stuart Black; Sc : Jo Eisinger	20 January 1962	010
Guest cast: William Marshall, Edric Connor, Barbara Chilcott ... Christopher Carlos, Earl Cameron, Lionel Ngakane, Andre Dakar, John Harrison, Lloyd Reckord, Harcourt Curacao, Pearl Prescod An African country is on the brink of civil war after a murder. Drake plunges into jungle to find those responsible.

=== Series 2 (1964–65) ===
Series 2 and 3 were broadcast as Danger Man in the UK and Secret Agent in the US. Airdate is for ATV Midlands; ITV regions varied date and order.

No. overall	No. in series	Title	Directed by	Written by	Original release date	Prod. code
40	1	"Yesterday's Enemies"	Charles Crichton	Donald Jonson	13 October 1964	048
Guest cast: Maureen Connell, Howard Marion Crawford, Anton Rodgers, Joan Hickson, Peter Copley, Patricia Driscoll, Aubrey Morris ... Peter Madden, Ivor Salter, April Wilding, Lynn Taylor, George Eugeniou, George Zenios, Nadim Sawalha, Raul Alkazzi Secrets are going astray in Beirut. Has a former British agent (Howard Marion Crawford) set up his own spy ring?
41	2	"The Professionals"	Michael Truman	Wilfred Greatorex & Louis Marks	20 October 1964	043
Guest cast: Helen Cherry ... Nadja Regin, Jerry Stovin, Alex Scott ... John Welsh, Noel Johnson, Joan Young, Steve Plytas, Hana Pravda, Jan Conrad, Stella Courtney, John G. Heller, Brenda Dunrich, Charles Laszlo An M9 agent is missing. Drake goes undercover in Prague to find him and is targeted by a Czech spy and his femme fatale.
42	3	"Colony Three"	Don Chaffey	Donald Jonson	27 October 1964	049
Guest cast: Glyn Owen, Niall MacGinnis, Peter Arne, Katherine Woodville ... George Mikell, Peter Madden, Edward Underdown, Cicely Paget-Bowman, Peter Jesson, Laurence Herder, Charles Laszlo British communists are disappearing behind the Iron Curtain. Drake follows their trail to a replica of a British town used to acquaint Russian infiltrators with British ways.
43	4	"The Galloping Major"	Peter Maxwell	David Stone	3 November 1964	047
Guest cast: William Marshall ... Errol John, Earl Cameron, Edric Connor, Arnold Diamond, Jill Melford ... Geoffrey Lumsden, Nora Nicholson, Lloyd Reckord, Zakes Mokae, Danny Daniels, Heather Emmanuel, Ron Blackman, Jimmy Falana, Willie Payne Posing as Major Sullivan, Drake is sent to protect a new African government from election-time deceit and violence. Dodging an industrialist's predatory wife (Jill Melford), Drake discovers the real deceit, and his last-minute plot makes the election more honest than anyone else intended.
44	5	"Fair Exchange"	Charles Crichton	Wilfred Greatorex & Marc Brandel	10 November 1964	042
Guest cast: Lelia Goldoni ... James Maxwell, George Mikell, Andre van Gyseghem, Barry Linehan, Edwin Apps, Raymond Adamson, Noel Howlett, Kenneth Adams, Thomas Gallagher, John Kirby, Hugo De Vernier, Jeremy Tunnecliffe, Bernard Davies, Ernest Lindsay, Bruce Wightman British agent Elizabeth Lanzig (Lelia Goldoni) vows revenge on the East German spymaster who tortured her. Drake is ordered to stop her, and finally succeeds by kidnapping the son of a rival spymaster (Andre van Gyseghem) and exchanging him for her.
45	6	"Fish on the Hook"	Robert Day	John Roddick & Michael Pertwee	17 November 1964	040
Guest cast: Dawn Addams ... Zena Marshall, Terence Longdon, Martin Miller, Peter Bowles, Vladek Sheybal, Michael Godfrey, Harvey Hall, Robert Henderson, Clive Russell, Walter Randall, Durra, Prem Bakshi, Karen Clare The name "Fish" hides the identity of the organiser of a complex espionage system who is in danger of being exposed unless Drake is successful in his hazardous mission to Egypt.
46	7	"The Colonel's Daughter"	Philip Leacock	David Weir	24 November 1964	044
Guest cast: Virginia Maskell ... Michael Trubshawe, Warren Mitchell, Zia Mohyeddin, John Bennett, George Pastell ... Kenneth Adams, Frank Olegario, Michael Nightingale, Kumar Ranji, Balu Patel, Dean Francis, Zoe Zephyr, Jaron Yaltan In India, a retired colonel ekes out his pension by collecting and selling butterfly specimens. When the colonel's assistant dies mysteriously, Drake is sent to investigate, and ends up getting help from a local policeman, whose own investigation Drake pursues. Finally, both trails entwine.
47	8	"The Battle of the Cameras"	Don Chaffey	Philip Broadley	1 December 1964	051
Guest cast: Dawn Addams ... Niall MacGinnis, Frederick Bartman, Peter Madden, Patrick Newell ... Jose Berlinka, Gilbert France, John Serret, Henry De Bray, Hugo De Vernier On the French Riviera, Drake poses as playboy gambler Peter Simons to gain the confidence of crafty spy czar A.J.A. Kent (Niall MacGinnis) and his accomplices, the beautiful Martine (Dawn Addams) and judo master Genicot (Frederick Bartman). Compromised by an overeager assistant (Patrick Newell) who is photographed and identified, Drake feigns gullible drunkenness and turns a trap around on his enemies.
48	9	"No Marks for Servility"	Don Chaffey	Ralph Smart	8 December 1964	052
Guest cast: Mervyn Johns ... Francesca Annis, Howard Marion Crawford, Suzan Farmer ... Peter Illing, Peter Madden, John Cazabon, Elizabeth Ashley, Frederick Piper, John G. Heller International extortionist Gregori Benares (Howard Marion Crawford) marries a lovely young Englishwoman (Suzan Farmer) and takes her to Rome; they stay in a villa where the butler is John Drake. An ally of the shy wife and implacable enemy of the sadistic Benares, Drake exposes the man's kidnapping plot.
49	10	"A Man to be Trusted"	Peter Maxwell	Raymond Bowers	15 December 1964	050
Guest cast: Harvey Ashby, Patricia Donahue, Ralph Michael, Eunice Gayson ... Wanda Ventham, Christopher Carlos, Alvaro Fontana, Harry Baird, Tracy Connell, The Boscoe Holder Dancers Posing as a Scotland Yard detective, Drake arrives in the West Indies to investigate a murder and test the reliability of the local contact for British intelligence, a flamboyant Colonel Mora (Harvey Ashby). After close calls with women and voodoo cults, Drake sorts the evil from the good.
50	11	"Don't Nail Him Yet"	Michael Truman	Philip Broadley	22 December 1964	041
Guest cast: John Fraser ... Sheila Allen ... Anthony Dawson, Raymond Adamson, Edwin Apps, Edward Chapman, Edward Cast, Wendy Richard, Leonard Monaghan, Keith Bell, Jackie Pearce, Nicholas Hawtrey, Ian Collin British intelligence suspects that Rawson (John Fraser) is selling secrets. Drake poses as a wimpy schoolteacher picked on by teenagers, wins Rawson's friendship, and trails him to a soccer game, but resists simply pulling Rawson in until he can prove the treason. Following the man to a bookstore, Drake sees his quarry bolt, but discovers an accomplice (Sheila Allen) and sinister spymaster.
51	12	"A Date with Doris"	Quentin Lawrence	Philip Broadley	29 December 1964	054
Guest cast: Jane Merrow, Ronald Radd ... Eric Pohlmann, James Maxwell ... Marne Maitland, Richard Bebb, David Lander, David Cargill, Carlos Douglas, Micky Ventura, Alvaro Fontana, David Charlesworth, Guido Ardoni, Donald Tandy, Charles Hill, Magda Konopke, Richard Owens, Juan Llinares, Michael Martin, Roy Vincente, Peter Brayham, Michael Marten, and The Islanders In a revolutionary Latin American state, Drake's friend Peter is framed for the murder of a general's mistress. Extracting the wounded Peter is a job for Drake, undercover as a journalist; and he finds an unlikely ally. When the general himself joins the chase, the escape becomes a matter of hairbreadth timing.
52	13	"That's Two of Us Sorry"	Quentin Lawrence	Jan Read	5 January 1965	046
Guest cast: Francesca Annis ... Finlay Currie, Nigel Green, Duncan Lamont, Brian Phelan ... Graham Crowden, Barbara Lott, Julie Wallace, Duncan McIntrye, Rory MacDermot, Sara Branch, Stephen Jack, John Southworth, Ian Flintoff Drake is sent to a remote Scottish island to investigate a set of fingerprints that belong to a spy who was long thought dead. The results surprise (and chagrin) everyone.
53	14	"Such Men Are Dangerous"	Don Chaffey	Ralph Smart	12 January 1965	055
Guest cast: Lee Montague ... Jack MacGowran, Zia Mohyeddin, Jack Gwillim, John Cairney, Alan Wheatley, Georgina Ward ... Peter Madden, Robert O'Neil, Thomas Baptiste, Roger Maxwell, Tom Gill, Ivor Salter, Erik Chitty, Dorinda Stevens, Patrick Connor, David Cargill, Henry Kay, Martine Beswick, Judy Huxtable, Ann Colston Drake takes the place of an ex-convict recruited as an assassin by an organisation which believes its mission is to eliminate undesirable world leaders (identified in the episode as the Knights Templar). When sent on his first assignment, Drake allows his victim to escape, revealing his identity.
54	15	"Whatever Happened to George Foster?"	Don Chaffey	David Stone	19 January 1965	056
Guest cast: Adrienne Corri, Bernard Lee ... Jill Melford, Joyce Carey, Colin Douglas ... Patsy Smart, Richard Caldicot, Redmond Phillips, Jack Bligh, Michael Collins, Dorothea Phillips, Sonia Fox, Jeremy Ranchev, Barbara Leake, Bill Corlett, Eynon Evans, Dafydd Havard, Evan Thomas, Norman Wynne, Roderick Jones, Brian Anderson By accident Drake discovers that a new Latin American republic is being sabotaged by a British industrialist (Bernard Lee) for his own ends. Inexorably, Drake hunts down the industrialist's shady past and trades it for the small nation's autonomy.
55	16	"A Room in the Basement"	Don Chaffey	Ralph Smart	2 February 1965	057
Guest cast: Jane Merrow ... William Lucas, Michael Gwynn, Mark Dignam, Gerard Heinz, John Breslin, Edward Cast ... John Welsh, Jack May, Margo Johns, Kate O'Mara, John Cater, Jose Berlinka, Peter Elliott, Brenda Lawrence Drake's old friend Keith is kidnapped by the opposition and held in the Embassy of Romania in Geneva. Called into unofficial action by Keith's wife, Susan (Jane Merrow), Drake enlists the help of two friends and Susan herself. She poses as a rich hysteric and he as her doctor. The four engineer a daring rooftop-to-basement rescue.
56	17	"The Affair at Castelevara"	Quentin Lawrence	James Foster	9 February 1965	058
Guest cast: ... Eric Pohlmann, Harold Goldblatt, Martin Benson, Andre Morell, Alan Gifford, Aubrey Morris, Brian Worth, Sonia Fox ... Charles Tingwell, Richard Leech, David Saire, David Graham, David Ritch, Clive Cazes, Paul Armstrong Drake is sent to a Hispanic country where an heroic old revolutionary is scheduled for execution. The Americans have a plan to save him, but Drake has a better idea, one that involves a documentary film and a chase through a theatre that sports a Rock Hudson poster.
57	18	"The Ubiquitous Mr. Lovegrove"	Don Chaffey	David Stone	16 February 1965	053
Guest cast: Adrienne Corri, Eric Barker ... Francis De Wolff, Patsy Rowlands, Peter Butterworth ... Edward Underdown, Mike Pratt, John Cazabon, Desmond Llewelyn, Patrick Connor, Peter Gill, Terrance Hooper Speeding on his way to the airport, Drake swerves to avoid a couple of young boys chasing a ball and loses control of his car. The rest of this story is supplied by Drake's subconscious: A duel of wits in which the hobo he passed on the road right before his accident morphs into the suave, sinister casino owner Mr. Alexander, whose unsavory deeds range from attempting to blackmail Drake to passing secrets via microdots on gambling chits.
58	19	"It's Up to the Lady"	Michael Truman	Philip Broadley	23 February 1965	045
Guest cast: Sylvia Syms ... Robert Urquhart, Maxwell Shaw ... Peter Madden, Vera Cook, Harry Tardios, Meadows White, Sarah Brackett, Andreas Lysandrou, George Zenios, Antony Baird, John Bryans, William Hurndell, Sally Douglas Charles Glover (Robert Urquhart), an idealistic Briton, flees eastward, and Drake follows Glover's wife Paula (Sylvia Syms ) to a Greek village, where the opposition, in the person of one Nicos (Maxwell Shaw), is determined to bag the couple. Drake must convince the wife to return with her husband to England, where he is told the man will receive amnesty.
59	20	"Have a Glass of Wine"	Peter Maxwell	David Stone	2 March 1965	059
Guest cast: Ann Lynn ... Warren Mitchell, George Benson, Kathleen Breck, Victor Brooks ... Michael Balfour, Larry Taylor, Brian Weske, Anita Sharp Bolster, Ann Heffernan, Sarah Brackett, Roger Avon, Michael Corcoran A spoof of France, and a chase across its wine country—mostly by night. Drake follows a blackmailed Englishwoman to France where her military secrets are passed to a Russian agent posing as a French wine merchant (Warren Mitchell). They are intercepted by a local female spy who believes she has outwitted both, until Drake turns the tables and brings his own bottle.
60	21	"The Mirror's New"	Michael Truman	Philip Broadley	9 March 1965	060
Guest cast: Donald Houston ... David Hutcheson, Wanda Ventham, Nicola Pagett ... Bill Nagy, Mary Yeomans, Ernst Walder, Alison Seebohm, Jerome Willis, Yvonne Marquand, Frank Maher A British diplomat (Donald Houston) in Paris goes missing for a day, and claims he can't remember it. Investigating, Drake improvises, first as a German-Irish encyclopaedia salesman and later as the diplomat's gambling buddy. Tortured by two men (one of them Frank Maher, McGoohan's own stunt double), Drake finds the diplomat's triple life has been financed by a dead man.
61	22	"Parallel Lines Sometimes Meet"	Don Chaffey	Malcolm Hulke	16 March 1965	061
Guest cast: Moira Redmond ... Errol John, Earl Cameron, Clifton Jones, Paul Danquah ... Christopher Carlos, Pearl Prescod, Robert Dean, Edward Brayshaw, Margaret Nolan, Boscoe Holder, Janet Hargreaves, Louis Mahoney, Joseph Layode Two English scientists, the Brooks, disappear from a beach. Pursuing them to Haiti, Drake finds a disputed dead man, hears a tale of zombie mineworkers, and meets Russian agent Nicola Tarasova (Moira Redmond). Both spies find themselves following the trail of Dessiles, a Russian atomic scientist wooed by an African government. Dessile's mine is the site of a narrow escape for Drake, along with temporary ally Tarasova and the missing Brooks couple.

=== Series 3 (1965–66) ===
Some books list episodes 3-1 to 3–10 as part of series 2 due to change of studio from 3–11. Airdates are again as for ATV Midlands.

No. overall	No. in series	Title	Directed by	Written by	Original release date	Prod. code
62	1	"The Black Book"	Michael Truman	Philip Broadley	30 September 1965	067
Guest cast: Georgina Ward, Griffith Jones, Jack Gwillim, Patricia Haines ... Mike Pratt, Richard Owens, Fredric Abbott, Ray Roberts, Edward Sinclair, Beresford Williams A British Embassy official is being blackmailed and Drake is sent to expose the blackmailers and eliminate their hold over the official. The trail leads to a black book of western blackmail targets.
63	2	"A Very Dangerous Game"	Don Chaffey	Ralph Smart & David Stone	7 October 1965	066
Guest cast: Yvonne Furneaux ... Peter Arne, Poulet Tu, Anthony Dawson, Burt Kwouk, Geoffrey Bayldon, Dennis Ramsden ... Charles Carson, Mike Pratt, Norma West, Anthony Chinn, Cyril Chamberlain, Christopher Sandford, Cecil Cheng, Paul Tann, Mona Chong, Harry Brooks, Yu-Ling, Tommy Yap, Donald Chan Drake takes the place of a defector (Anthony Dawson) in a plan to infiltrate Chinese Intelligence in Singapore.
64	3	"Sting in the Tail"	Peter Yates	Philip Broadley	14 October 1965	065
Guest cast: Ronald Radd ... Derren Nesbitt, John Standing, Jeanne Roland, David Collings, Jeremy Spenser ... Julian Somers, Andrew Laurence, Mary Webster, Ernst Ulman, Juliet Harmer, Christine Child, Neville Becker, Jose Berlinka, Zeynep Tarimer Drake provokes the jealousy of a political assassin (Derren Nesbitt), wanted by the Parisian police, to leave the safety of Beirut.
65	4	"You're Not in Any Trouble, Are You?"	Don Chaffey	Philip Broadley	21 October 1965	062
In order to infiltrate a murder organisation Drake commissions his own murder.
66	5	"Loyalty Always Pays"	Peter Yates	David Stone	28 October 1965	070
The last message from an M9 agent in Africa reveals that China is about to gain a foothold in a country where Britain has financial interests. Drake is sent to discredit the Chinese.
67	6	"The Mercenaries"	Don Chaffey	Ralph Smart	4 November 1965	064
Drake has the job, following a murdered M9 agent, of infiltrating a group of mercenaries planning to depose an African leader on behalf of his rival.
68	7	"Judgement Day"	Don Chaffey	St : Michael J. Bird; Sc : Donald Jonson	11 November 1965	068
Drake sent to the Middle East to bring back a German scientist accused of war crimes has to defend him against Israeli agents wanting their own brand of justice.
69	8	"The Outcast"	Michael Truman	Donald Jonson	18 November 1965	063
When a Wren is murdered carrying secret papers and her missing boyfriend (Bernard Bresslaw) is the chief suspect, Drake follows him to Spain and befriends him in search of the truth.
70	9	"English Lady Takes Lodgers"	Michael Truman	David Stone	25 November 1965	069
Drake investigates an agency in Lisbon dealing in stolen secrets and comes across a boarding house landlady (Gabriella Licudi) dealing in stolen passports.
71	10	"Are You Going to Be More Permanent?"	Don Chaffey	Philip Broadley	2 December 1965	071
When M9 controllers mysteriously disappear in Geneva and a traitor is identified as one of three persons, Drake takes up the position of the new controller.
72	11	"To Our Best Friend"	Patrick McGoohan	Ralph Smart	9 December 1965	072
Drake finds himself assigned to find out if a colleague (Donald Houston) is a double agent. Unfortunately for him, that colleague is also his best friend.
73	12	"The Man on the Beach"	Peter Yates	Philip Broadley	16 December 1965	073
Drake is sent to Jamaica to identify an M9 double agent operating from a luxury hotel but spends his time drinking and lying on the beach much to his superiors' annoyance.
74	13	"Say It with Flowers"	Peter Yates	Jacques Gillies	23 December 1965	075
When money is drawn from the account of a dead freelance agent, Drake is sent to the clinic in Switzerland where the man had died three months previously.
75	14	"The Man Who Wouldn't Talk"	Michael Truman	Donald Jonson & Ralph Smart	30 December 1965	074
When the M9 regional controller is captured in Bulgaria, Drake must effect a rescue before he talks under torture.
76	15	"Someone Is Liable to Get Hurt"	Michael Truman	Philip Broadley	6 January 1966	076
A Caribbean country's elections are threatened by an impending arms deal, but the local M9 agent has disappeared. Drake is sent to investigate.
77	16	"Dangerous Secret"	Stuart Burge	Ralph Smart & Donald Jonson	13 January 1966	077
A leading pacifist scientist creates a lethal virus and not trusting the government flees to France pursued by Drake and other interested parties wanting the virus.
78	17	"I Can Only Offer You Sherry"	George Pollock	Ralph Smart	20 January 1966	078
A leak from a British embassy in the Middle East leads Drake to an unassuming secretary (Wendy Craig) and, posing as a journalist, he befriends her.
79	18	"The Hunting Party"	Pat Jackson	Philip Broadley	27 January 1966	079
Drake poses as a butler to a man, and his domineering wealthy wife, suspected of leaking information to the newspapers. But how does he do it?
80	19	"Two Birds with One Bullet"	Peter Yates	Jesse Lasky & Pat Silver	10 March 1966	080
At a forthcoming Caribbean election in a British colony, M9 learn one of the parties plan to kill their own candidate to discredit the British. Drake has to protect the potential victim.
81	20	"I'm Afraid You Have the Wrong Number"	George Pollock	Ralph Smart	17 March 1966	081
A British spymaster is kidnapped by enemy counterintelligence agents in Geneva. Drake has to find him and spring him before he talks and betrays the ring he has created in the enemy's embassy.
82	21	"The Man with the Foot"	Jeremy Summers	Raymond Bowers	24 March 1966	082
Drake is sent on extended holiday when his cover is blown but he is pursued by another agent.
83	22	"The Paper Chase"	Patrick McGoohan	Philip Broadley & Ralph Smart	31 March 1966	083
Confidential papers are stolen from an embassy official in Rome. Drake is sent to recover them.
84	23	"Not So Jolly Roger"	Don Chaffey	Tony Williamson	7 April 1966	084
A wartime offshore sea fort being used as a pirate radio station is transmitting secrets to an enemy submarine. One agent has already been murdered on the fort. Drake has to find out how the transmissions are being done and find the culprit amongst the crew.

=== Series 4 (1968) ===
Airdates are for ATV Midlands. ATV London broadcast on 19 February and 26 February 1967 respectively.

No. overall	No. in series	Title	Directed by	Written by	Original release date	Prod. code
85	1	"Koroshi"	Michael Truman & Peter Yates	Norman Hudis	5 January 1968	085
An M9 agent (Yoko Tani) is murdered in Tokyo while transmitting a message about the impending assassination of a United Nations mediator. Drake is assigned to protect the official.
86	2	"Shinda Shima"	Peter Yates	Norman Hudis	12 January 1968	086
Assigned to take the place of an electronics expert to infiltrate a Japanese murder brotherhood, Drake follows a trail to Shinda Shima ('the murdered island').

These two episodes, which were shot in colour, were broadcast in the US as the European cinema movie version, Koroshi. The show's abrupt cancellation, to make way for production and broadcast of star Patrick McGoohan's The Prisoner, resulted in these final two shows airing in the UK early in 1968, when they were broadcast as fill-in episodes for The Prisoner which had fallen behind the scheduled UK transmission dates, replacing advertised Prisoner episodes that were not yet ready for broadcast. They were originally intended to be broadcast after the finale of The Prisoner in the UK. Some parts of the UK, as well as the US, never saw the episodes in their original form until their DVD release.
