= Jim McManus (actor) =

British actor (1940–2023)

- Born: 19 May 1940; Bristol, England
- Died: 11 April 2023 (aged 82)
- Occupation: Actor
- Years active: 1959–2014

Jim McManus (19 May 1940 – 11 April 2023) was a British actor who starred in various television, stage and film roles, including Tipping the Velvet, Lawless Heart and Only Fools and Horses. In the 1970s he appeared in the Doctor Who serial The Invisible Enemy. He also starred in the popular television drama Heartbeat and twice in critically acclaimed drama Minder. He also voice acted in the 1997 TV series The Treacle People and the 2007 animated film Quest for a Heart.

McManus briefly played Aberforth Dumbledore (credited as "Barman") in the fifth Harry Potter film, Harry Potter and the Order of the Phoenix in 2007. He also had roles in Silver Dream Racer (1980), Just Ask for Diamond (1988), Buddy's Song (1991) and Easy Virtue (2008), and featured in the 2014 film Pride, directed by Matthew Warchus.

McManus died on 11 April 2023, at the age of 82.

== Filmography ==
=== Film ===
Year	Title	Role	Notes
1959	The Square Peg	New Recruit	Uncredited
1959	Danger Within	Prisoner of War	Uncredited
1961	The Day the Earth Caught Fire	Man at Water Station	Uncredited
1975	Legend of the Werewolf	Emigre Husband	Credited as James McManus
1978	Sweeney 2	Barman	
1979	Murder by Decree	Policeman	Uncredited
1980	Silver Dream Racer	Bike Salesman	
1988	Just Ask for Diamond	Hammett	
1991	Buddy's Song	Detective	
2001	Lawless Heart	Chef	
2003	Machine	Unknown	Short film
2004	Nella Notte	Ministro Russo	
2005	Beneath Still Waters	Additional voices	
2007	Harry Potter and the Order of the Phoenix	Barman	
2008	Easy Virtue	Jackson	
2014	Pride	Old Man	

=== Television ===
Year	Title	Role	Notes
1963	Comedy Playhouse	Left Luggage Attendant (as James McManus)	Episode: "The Plan"
1964	Sykes and A...	Unknown (as James McManus)	Episode: "Sykes and a Following"
1964	Detective	Police Constable (as James McManus)	Episode: "The Drawing"
1964	The Graham Stark Show	Actor (as James McManus)	Episode: #1.4
1965–1966	Crossroads	Ron Bateman (as James McManus)	2 episodes
1963–1966	Hugh and I	Record Store Customer (as James McManus)	4 episodes
1966	The Frankie Howerd Show	Unknown (as James McManus)	Episode: #2.2
1966–1967	Softly Softly	McMichael Niggy White (as James McManus)	2 episodes
1967	The Wednesday Play	Man (as James McManus)	Episode: "The Playground"
1968	The Spanish Farm	Jerry (as James McManus)	Episode: "The Crime at Vanderlynden's"
1968	The Expert	Ambulanceman (as James McManus)	Episode: "And So Say All of Us"
1962–1968	Z Cars	Clarke Cowboy (as James McManus)	2 episodes
1968	Harry Worth	Collins Flight Sergeant McAllister (as James McManus)	2 episodes
1969	The Gnomes of Dulwich	Gnome (as James McManus)	Episode: #1.4
1970	Steptoe and Son	Journalist (as James McManus)	Episode: "Robbery with Violence"
1971	Albert!	Ken Farrell (as James McManus)	Episode: "The Compulsive Gambler"
1971	The Mind of Mr. J.G. Reeder	Louie (as James McManus)	Episode: "The Duke"
1971	Armchair Theatre	Gould (as James McManus)	Episode: "Brown Skin Gal, Stay Home and Mind Bay-Bee"
1971	Softly Softly: Task Force	Parson (as James McManus)	Episode: "Once Bitten"
1972	Clochemerle	4th Secretary (as James McManus)	Episode: "The Inexorable Power of the Third Republic"
1972	Bless This House	Man in Pub (as James McManus)	Episode: "Wives and Lovers"
1971–1972	Father, Dear Father	Porter Taxi Man (as James McManus)	2 episodes
1972	Doctor in Charge	Workman (as James McManus)	Episode: "Long Day's Journey Into Knighthood"
1972	Scoop	Shumble (as James McManus)	2 episodes
1973	The Upper Crusts	2nd Auctioneer (as James McManus)	Episode: "Decline and Fall"
1973	Barlow	Denby (as James McManus)	Episode: "Wheelbarrows"
1973	Ooh La La!	Jean (as James McManus)	Episode: "Kept on a String"
1971–1973	The Fenn Street Gang	Football Trainer Taxi Driver Voice	3 episodes
1973	New Scotland Yard	The Painter (as James McManus)	Episode: "Daisy Chain"
1973	Bowler	Milkman (as James McManus)	Episode: "Without Let or Hindrance"
1966–1976	Dixon of Dock Green	Various	4 episodes
1976	The Sweeney	Ollie Parsons	Episode: "Visiting Fireman"
1977	Rough Justice	Squatter	Episode: "Trespass"
1977	Doctor Who	Ophthalmologist	3 episodes
1978	The Professionals	Lorry Driver's Mate	Episode: "Heroes"
1980	Juliet Bravo	Accrington Stanley	Episode: "The Anastasia Syndrome"
1981	The Other 'Arf	Driver	Episode: "Moving Away"
1981	The Chinese Detective	Eel & Pie Shop Proprietor	Episode: "The Four from Fulham"
1981	Rosie	Vinnie	Episode: "Tune on a Silent Dog Whistle"
1981	Roger Doesn't Live Here Anymore	Cab driver	Episode: #1.3
1982	Harry Carpenter Never Said It Was Like This	Unknown	Television film
1982	Only Fools and Horses	Alex	Episode: "It Never Rains..."
1986	Bergerac	Filing Clerk	Episode: "Fires in the Fall"
1987	ScreenPlay	Damian	Episode: "The Trial of Klaus Barbie"
1988	Casting Off	Bernard	4 episodes
1988	Bad Boyes	Fred	Episode: "Rose Arrives"
1989	Young Charlie Chaplin	Cab Driver	Episode: #1.6
1990	T-Bag	Sir Cedric	Episode: "Cedric Sackbutt's Search for a Song"
1990	Press Gang	Station Master Dutton	Episode: "Friends Like These"
1991	The Diamond Brothers	Mr. Innocent (uncredited)	Episode: "Strangers on a Chain"
1991	Trouble in Mind	Stanley Chambers	8 episodes
1992	The House of Eliott	Reginald	Episode: #2.3
1992	Screen One	Driver 1	Episode: "Running Late"
1982–1994	Minder	Brian George	2 episodes
1994	Chef!	Policeman 1	Episode: "Masterchef"
1995	Dangerous Lady	Mr. Critchley	Episode: #1.2
1996	Sharpe	Smithers	Episode: "Sharpe's Siege"
1996	Jack and Jeremy's Real Lives	Unknown	Episode: "Hospital Entrepreneurs"
1993–1996	Casualty	Harry Ronnie Lee Davis	2 episodes
1997	Underworld	Police Officer	Episode: #1.4
1996–1997	The Treacle People	Voice	26 episodes
1999	Goodnight Sweetheart	Brian Merry	Episode: "How I Won the War"
1988–2000	The Bill	Various	7 episodes
2001	EastEnders	Mr. Samson	Episode dated 7 May 2001
2002	Doctors	Jack Hampton	Episode: "Golden Years"
2002	Tipping the Velvet	Tricky Reeves	Episode: #1.1
2003	Hownblower: Loyalty	Pawnbroker	Television film
2003	Serious and Organised	Cafe Owner	Episode: "Greed"
2004	Heartbeat	Clive Formby	2 episodes

=== Video games ===
Year	Title	Role	Notes
2007	Hellgate: London	Voice	
