= Richard O'Sullivan =

English actor (1944–2026)

- O'Sullivan as Robin Tripp in Man About the House
- Born: Richard Thomas O'Sullivan; 7 May 1944; Chiswick, London, England
- Died: 4 September 2026 (aged 82); Twickenham, London, England
- Education: Corona Theatre School
- Occupation: Actor
- Years active: 1953–1996, 1999, 2006
- Spouses: Diana Terry (m. 1971; div. 1971); Christine Smart (m. 1988; div. 1994)
- Partners: Sally Thomsett (1973–1976); Tessa Wyatt (1978–1985)
- Children: 1

Richard Thomas O'Sullivan (7 May 1944 – 4 September 2026) was an English comedy actor.

O'Sullivan started his career as a child actor. He became best known for his roles as Robin Tripp in the television sitcoms Man About the House (1973–1976) and its spin-off, Robin's Nest (1977–1981), and also as the title character in the period adventure series Dick Turpin (1979–1982).

Other television credits include Doctor at Large (1971), Doctor in Charge (1972–1973), Alcock and Gander (1972), Me and My Girl (1984–1988), and Trouble In Mind (1991).

== Early life ==
O'Sullivan was born to John and Ellen O'Sullivan (née Fleming) on 7 May 1944, in Chiswick, England, where he grew up with his younger brother. His early education was at St John the Evangelist's RC Primary School in Brentford, Middlesex. After a family holiday in Ireland as a boy, he returned with a strong Irish accent and was sent to the Corona Theatre School to soften it.

== Career as child actor ==
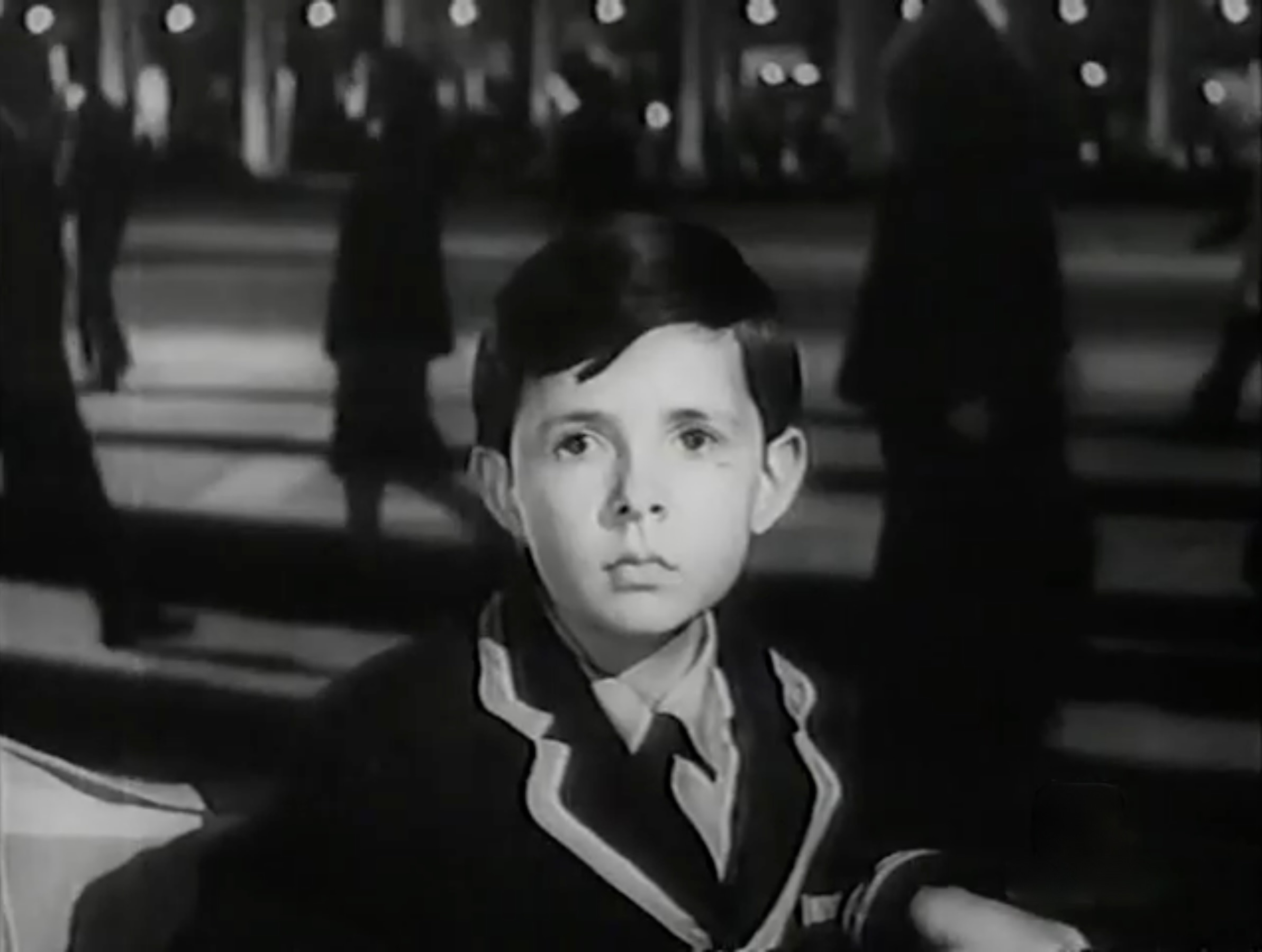
O'Sullivan as a child actor in The Stranger's Hand

O'Sullivan appeared in his first film at the age of eight as an extra as one of the children singing in the Sunday school sequence of The Yellow Balloon, filmed in 1952 and released in 1953. He then played the main character in The Stranger's Hand, starring Alida Valli and Trevor Howard, in 1953.

Possibly his earliest television work was his part in a Sherlock Holmes episode, "The Case of the Unlucky Gambler", broadcast on 18 July 1955. He appeared in the Children's Film Foundation's first serial, Raiders of the River, also produced in 1955. He also acted the part of Don Armado's pageboy Moth in Shakespeare's Love's Labour's Lost directed by Peter Hall at the Royal Shakespeare Theatre, Stratford, in 1956. In the film It's Great to Be Young (1956), he appeared alongside John Mills.

In 1957, he played the title character in the BBC Television five part Sunday serial Little Lord Fauntleroy, and then with Keith Michell and Belinda Lee in the opulent and swashbuckling Dangerous Exile playing Louis XVII, the ten-year-old son of Louis XVI and Marie Antoinette. During this period he also featured in two episodes of Sapphire Films' The Adventures of Robin Hood (1957) alongside Richard Greene, one role being that of Will Dale in the episode "The Challenge of the Black Knight". In the Sword of Freedom series (1957), also made by Sapphire, he played Alberto in the episode "Chart of Gold". In an early Carry On film, Carry On Teacher (1959), he had the small role of pupil Robin Stevens. Around the same time, he was cast in the role of Pierre van der Mal in an early scene of The Nun's Story (also 1959), playing the younger brother of Gabrielle (Audrey Hepburn). He had a leading role in an episode of the Sapphire/ITC series The Four Just Men ("The Man with the Golden Touch") (1959) as the Neapolitan street urchin Pietro who foils a robbery.

In the 1960s, O'Sullivan appeared in two Cliff Richard films: The Young Ones (1961) and Wonderful Life (1964).

== Adult acting career ==
O'Sullivan featured in the 1963 blockbuster film Cleopatra as Pharaoh Ptolemy XIII, the younger brother of the title character played by Elizabeth Taylor.

For the remainder of the 1960s, O'Sullivan was a jobbing actor appearing in such TV series as Dr. Syn, Alias the Scarecrow, Emergency Ward 10, Redcap, Danger Man, No Hiding Place, Dixon of Dock Green, and Strange Report among others, until he was offered the role of Lawrence Bingham in the LWT sitcom Doctor at Large (1971), a role which continued in the later Doctor in Charge (1972–73). Meanwhile, he also had a main role in the Thames Television comedy Alcock and Gander (1972) with Beryl Reid.

By then a regular in TV sitcoms, he starred as Robin Tripp, a trainee chef, in the flatshare sitcom Man About the House written by Johnnie Mortimer and Brian Cooke, launched in 1973. The series was a huge success and was considered risqué due to Tripp sharing a flat with two young women, played by Paula Wilcox and Sally Thomsett, whilst under the watchful eye of their landlords, played by Yootha Joyce and Brian Murphy. A feature film version of the series was released in 1974. In 1975, O'Sullivan starred in the stage comedy Boeing Boeing, undertaking two record-breaking national tours, alongside three of his Man About the House co-stars, Joyce, Thomsett and Doug Fisher.

When Man About the House ended in 1976, O'Sullivan continued playing Robin Tripp in the spin-off sitcom Robin's Nest, in which Robin sets up a bistro with funding from his girlfriend Vicky's father, James Nicholls (Tony Britton).

Robin's Nest was a ratings success, and was the first UK sitcom to feature an unmarried couple cohabiting. To tie in with the series, O'Sullivan wrote a recipe book called Man About the Kitchen, and a sequel Roastin' with Richard, which were published in 1980. He also wrote the Robin's Nest theme tune, which was arranged by Brian Bennett. During that period, O'Sullivan also appeared in adverts for British Gas.

In 1979, O'Sullivan starred in the title role of LWT's drama series Dick Turpin, which ran until 1982. He then played the widower Simon Harrup in the sitcom Me and My Girl, broadcast from 1984 to 1988, co-starring Tim Brooke-Taylor and Joan Sanderson, also produced by LWT. He also appeared in a one-off comedy-drama The Giftie, shown on Channel Four in 1988, in which he and a friend (John Wells) discovered a photocopier at work that could duplicate living copies of themselves, unwisely doing so, and predictably leading to mistaken identities and chaos. In the 1990s, his profile diminished, although he was never short of work. His final acting role was in a 1996 one-off satire titled Holed, with Tony Robinson, about a suburban golf club.

O'Sullivan largely retired from public life in 1996. His last appearance on television was as a guest on a 1999 edition of This Is Your Life held in honour of his Doctor... co-star George Layton. O'Sullivan had himself been the subject of the show in 1974. In 2006, O'Sullivan recorded a commentary for the DVD release of Carry On Teacher.

== Personal life and death ==
O'Sullivan married the model Diana Terry in 1971; they divorced later that year. During his run as Robin, O'Sullivan had relationships with two of his co-stars, Sally Thomsett from Man About the House, and Tessa Wyatt who played Vicky in Robin's Nest. She divorced Tony Blackburn during their seven-year relationship. They had one son together. O'Sullivan was married to Christine Smart from 1988 until their divorce in 1994.

A fan of Chelsea F.C., O'Sullivan also played for a number of charity football teams until a broken leg forced retirement.

During the 1990s, O'Sullivan suffered from a period of ill health. Following a stroke in 2003, O'Sullivan lived in Brinsworth House, a Royal Variety Charity retirement home for entertainers in Twickenham.

O'Sullivan died at Brinsworth House on 4 September 2026, aged 82.

== Filmography ==
=== Film ===
Year	Title	Role	Notes
1953	The Yellow Balloon	Boy Singing at Sunday School	Uncredited roles
1953	Malta Story	Ninno Gonzar	Uncredited roles
1954	The Stranger's Hand	Roger Court	
1954	Dance Little Lady	Peter	
1954	The Green Scarf	Child Jacques	
1954	Make Me an Offer	Charlie as a Boy	
1954	Loves of Three Queens	Benoni	aka: The Face That Launched a Thousand Ships
1955	The Dark Avenger	Thomas Holland	
1955	The Secret	John Martin	
1956	Raiders of the River	Joey	
1956	Jacqueline	Michael	
1956	It's Great to Be Young	Lawson, one of The Angel Hill Kids	
1957	No Time for Tears	William Reynolds	
1957	Dangerous Exile	Louis XVII / Richard de Beauvais	
1959	The Nun's Story	Pierre van der Mal	Uncredited role
1959	Carry On Teacher	Robin Stevens, saboteur	
1959	Witness in the Dark	Don Theobald	
1960	And Women Shall Weep	Godfrey Lumsden	
1960	A Story of David	Abiathar	
1961	Spare the Rod	Fred Harkness	
1961	The Young Ones	Ernest	
1962	The Prince and The Pauper	Hugo	
1962	The Webster Boy	Jimmy Webster	
1963	Cleopatra	Pharaoh Ptolemy XIII	
1963	Dr. Syn, Alias the Scarecrow	George Ransley	
1964	Wonderful Life	Edward	U.S. title: Swingers' Paradise
1964	Every Day's a Holiday	Jimmy Dainty	
1968	A Dandy in Aspic	Nevil	
1969	The Haunted House of Horror	Peter	
1970	Futtocks End	The Boots	
1972	Au Pair Girls	Stephen	
1973	Father, Dear Father	Richard	
1974	Man About the House	Robin Tripp	
1974	Can You Keep It Up for a Week?	Mr. Rose	

=== Television ===
Year	Title	Role	Notes
1955	Sherlock Holmes	Andy Fenwick	Episode: "The Case of the Unlucky Gambler"
1955	Douglas Fairbanks, Jr., Presents	David Howard	Episode: "Forever Is a Long Time"
1956	Douglas Fairbanks, Jr., Presents	Tim	Episode: "Timmy the Shanks"
1956	Colonel March of Scotland Yard	Roger	Episode: "Error at Daybreak"
1956	London Playhouse	Johnny	Episode: "Jane Clegg"
1956	BBC Sunday-Night Theatre	Paton	Episode: "Escapade"
1957	Overseas Press Club – Exclusive!	Thomaso	Episode: "Father Tiger"
1957	Little Lord Fauntleroy	Cedric Errol	Mini-series; 4 episodes
1957	Sword of Freedom	Alberto	Episode: "Chart of Gold"
1957	The Adventures of Robin Hood	Will Dale	Episode: "The Challenge of the Black Knight"
1958	The Adventures of Robin Hood	Prince Arthur	Episode: "The Double"
1958	Television World Theatre	Gordon Evans as a Boy	Episode: "Strange Interlude: Part 2"
1958	Decision	Luke	Episode: "Stand and Deliver"
1958	Mary Britten, M.D.	David / Jimmy	Episode: "The Brothers"
1958	ITV Television Playhouse	Boy	Episode: "The Boy About the Place"
1958	ITV Television Playhouse	Eric Corrigan	Episode: "Honour Bright"
1959	ITV Television Playhouse	(unknown)	Episode: "The Haven"
1960	The Four Just Men	Pietro	Episode: "The Man with the Golden Touch"
1960	A House Called Bell Tower	Gary Jones	7 episodes
1960	DuPont Show of the Month	Jim Hawkins	Episode: "Treasure Island"
1963	Jezebel ex UK	Paul Brooks	Episode: "Love and Let Love"
1963	ITV Play of the Week	Digby	Episode: "Nice Break for the Boys"
1964	ITV Play of the Week	Lieutenant John Hallett	Episode: "Acquit or Hang"
1964	Redcap	Boy C.S.M. Duffy	Episode: "The Boys of B Company"
1965	Six Shades of Black	Dingo Jubb	Episode: "The Finer Things of Life"
1965	Emergency Ward 10	John Brown	7 episodes
1965	No Hiding Place	Tom	Episode: "The Best Years of Your Life"
1966	No Hiding Place	Digby Gabriel	Episode: "Golden Boy"
1966	Danger Man	Aldo Shargis	Episode: "Two Birds with One Bullet"
1966	Seven Deadly Sins	Mike Sands	Episode: "A Temporary Typist"
1966	Love Story	David	Episode: "Another Name from Nowhere"
1966	Foreign Affairs	Taplow	6 episodes, the series was wiped
1966	Conflict	George D'Alroy	Episode: "Caste"
1966	Drama 61-67	Lieutenant Charles Reed	Episode: "Drama '66: Conduct to the Prejudice"
1966	The Wednesday Play	Christopher Tenterden	Episode: "The Connoiseur"
1967	The Wednesday Play	Mark	Episode: "Who's Going to Take Me On?"
1967	Dixon of Dock Green	Geoffrey Saunders	Episode: "The Party"
1967	Great Expectations	Herbert Pocket	7 episodes
1967	Room at the Bottom	The Honourable Tarquin	Episode: #1.3
1967	The Golden Age	Robin	Episode: "Citizens"
1967	Scottish Playbill	(unknown)	Episode: "The Queen of Scots"
1968	Father, Dear Father	Steven	Episode: "I Should Have Danced All Night"
1968	Thirty-Minute Theatre	Lieutenant Halliday	Episode: "A Question of Honour"
1968	The Ronnie Barker Playhouse	Arthur	Episode: "The Incredible Mister Tanner"
1968	Play of the Month	Michael Barnes	Episode: "The Male Animal"
1969	Galton and Simpson Comedy	3rd Angel	Episode: "Friends in High Places"
1969	Dixon of Dock Green	Cris Patros	Episode: "Protest"
1969	Strange Report	Perk	Episode: "REPORT 2493 KIDNAP 'Whose pretty girl are you?'"
1970	Play for Today	Whiteley	Episode: "The Lie"
1971	Thirty-Minute Theatre	Second Lieutenant Auden	Episode: "Me MacKenna"
1971	Doctor at Large	Dr. Lawrence Bingham	10 episodes
1971	Now Look Here	Keith	7 episodes
1971, 1973	Father, Dear Father	Howard	2 episodes: "Nothing But the Tooth" & "Pop Around the Clock"
1972	Alcock and Gander	Richard Gander	6 episodes
1972–1973	Doctor in Charge	Dr. Lawrence Bingham	26 episodes (series 1 & 2)
1973–1976	Man About the House	Robin Tripp	39 episodes (series 1–6)
1974–1976	Whodunnit?	Himself – Panellist	3 episodes
1977–1981	Robin's Nest	Robin Tripp	48 episodes (series 1–6)
1979–1982	Dick Turpin	Dick Turpin	31 episodes (series 1–4)
1984–1988	Me and My Girl	Simon Harrap	52 episodes (series 1–6)
1988	The Giftie	Paul	Television film
1988	Mr. H. is Late	Breakfasting Neighbour	Television short
1991	Trouble in Mind	Adam Charlesworth	9 episodes
1991	Wogan	Himself – Guest	Episode: #11.25
1992	Noel's House Party	The Duke of Crinkley Bottom	Episode: #1.18
1996	Holed	Henry	Television film
1997	Light Lunch	Himself – Guest	Episode: "Robin's Nest: Our Favourite Seventies Sitcom"
1999	This Is Your Life	Himself – Guest	Episode: "George Layton"
