= Madhouse (1974 film) =

1974 British film by Jim Clark

- Theatrical release poster
- Directed by: Jim Clark
- Written by: Ken Levison; Greg Morrison
- Based on: Devilday; 1969 novel by Angus Hall
- Produced by: Max Rosenberg; Milton Subotsky executive Samuel Z. Arkoff
- Starring: Vincent Price; Peter Cushing; Robert Quarry; Adrienne Corri; Natasha Pyne; Michael Parkinson; Linda Hayden; Barry Dennen
- Cinematography: Ray Parslow
- Edited by: Clive Smith
- Music by: Douglas Gamley
- Production company: Amicus Productions
- Distributed by: American International Pictures
- Release dates: 28 March 1974 (USA); November 1974 (UK)
- Running time: 91 minutes
- Countries: United Kingdom; United States
- Language: English

Madhouse is a 1974 horror film directed by Jim Clark for Amicus Productions in association with American International Pictures. The film, which is a British-American co-production, stars Vincent Price, Natasha Pyne, Peter Cushing, Robert Quarry, Adrienne Corri, and Linda Hayden. The film was based on the 1969 novel Devilday by Angus Hall.

== Plot ==
Paul Toombes is a successful horror actor whose trademark role is Dr. Death, a skull-faced serial killer. During a party in Hollywood marking his fifth Dr. Death film, Paul announces his engagement to Ellen Mason, who gives him an engraved watch as an engagement gift. However, adult film producer Oliver Quayle reveals to Paul that Ellen previously performed in his movies and had also slept with him. Distraught at Paul's angry reaction, Ellen returns to her room, where a masked man in a Dr. Death costume approaches her with a knife. An apologetic Paul enters the room shortly after, only for her severed head to fall from her shoulders when he touches her. Although he is acquitted, Paul isn't sure whether he was the killer. His career is destroyed as he spends several years in a mental hospital.

Twelve years later, Paul is called to London by his friend, screenwriter Herbert Flay, who has partnered with Quayle to produce a Dr. Death television series for the BBC. While on the cruise en route to England, Paul encounters a persistent young actress, Elizabeth Peters, who steals his watch and follows him through London and eventually to Flay's house. In the spider-infested basement, Paul discovers Faye Carstairs, Flay's wife and a former Dr. Death co-star, who was driven mad after being disfigured in a car accident. Outside Flay's house, Elizabeth sees the costumed figure stalking the grounds, believing it to be Paul, she approaches him and is killed with a pitchfork. When her body is discovered, Scotland Yard suspects Paul, as the killing resembles a scene from one of the Dr. Death films.

Unimpressed to find that Quayle has given Dr. Death a female "assistant" for the series, which he never had in the films, Paul berates his co-star on set, she is soon found hanged by her hair, resembling another Dr. Death scene. Scotland Yard questions Paul but finds no conclusive evidence. Paul is also harassed by Elizabeth's parents, who have found the watch she had stolen and threaten to deliver the watch to the police unless he pays a ransom. However, the killer lures the parents into the house and impales them both with a broadsword. On set, the series director is crushed by a descending bed canopy in a trap intended for Paul. Later, Paul is chased through the studio by the killer while on his way to an interview. Julia Wilson, Quayle's public relations chief, discovers a contract in his files but is murdered by the killer, Paul discovers her body in a replication of Ellen's death, seated in front of her dressing table. A distraught Paul carries her body to the set, turns on the camera on and sets the place ablaze.

Believing Paul to have died in the fire, Flay signs a contract to take his place as Dr. Death. Later he watches the reel of film from Paul's "death" in his home – only to see Paul seemingly walk out of the screen, burned but alive. When Paul demands to know why Flay wishes to destroy him, Flay rages that he had written the Dr. Death role for himself, but was passed over in favour of Paul, he murdered Ellen to frame Paul in the hopes of destroying his career but was still not given the role. He then reveals that the contract that Julia had discovered stipulated that if Paul died, Flay would take over the role by right. The two struggle into the basement, where Faye enters and stabs Flay in the back. He falls into a tank of spiders and they devour his flesh. Paul applies makeup to his burn-scarred face, now looking similar to Flay, and sits down to dinner with Faye. Faye says she has made Paul his favourite meal – sour cream and "red herrings" – and they both laugh.

== Cast ==
- Vincent Price as Paul Toombes
- Peter Cushing as Herbert Flay
- Adrienne Corri as Faye Carstairs Flay
- Robert Quarry as Oliver Quayle
- Natasha Pyne as Julia Wilson
- Michael Parkinson as T.V. Interviewer
- Linda Hayden as Elizabeth Peters
- Barry Dennen as Gerry Blount
- Ellis Dale as Alfred Peters
- Catherine Willmer as Louise Peters
- John Garrie as Inspector Harper
- Ian Thompson as Bradshaw
- Jenny Lee-Wright as Carol Clayton
- Julie Crosthwait as Ellen Mason
- Peter Halliday as Psychiatrist

The title credits mention "special participation" by Basil Rathbone and Boris Karloff, who had died in 1967 and 1969, respectively, the film included scenes in which they had appeared with Vincent Price from previous AIP films (Rathbone from Tales of Terror, Karloff from The Raven). Other AIP films starring Price that had scenes played in the film include The Haunted Palace, The Pit and the Pendulum, Scream and Scream Again, and House of Usher.

== Production ==
American International Pictures purchased the rights to Angus Hall's novel Devilday in 1970. Although Robert Fuest was originally named as director, in 1973 Jim Clark was signed to direct, more known for his editing, this ended up being Clark's fourth and final feature film as a director. Filming began at London's Twickenham Studios. The film was originally meant to be titled The Revenge of Dr. Death, but this was changed to avoid confusion with Doctor Death: Seeker of Souls.

In his autobiography, Clark referred to the film as "stillborn," reflecting that the edits imposed by Milton Subotsky was the final nail of the coffin of a film that had its script worked on (by Ken Levison) during the actual production because of its quality. It was the last film to feature Price for American International, as his contract was not renewed (the feeling was mutual, as he once referred to Arkoff and his colleagues as "those cocksuckers!"

== Reception ==
The film opened in Los Angeles in December 1974.

=== Box office ===
The film performed considerably less well at the box office than other horror movies Price had made for AIP and Samuel Z. Arkoff considered it marked the end of the horror cycle.

=== Critical response ===
The Monthly Film Bulletin wrote: "The tale of an actor's revenge, exacted by Hammer veteran Peter Cushing on AIP stalwart Vincent Price, Madhouse borrows a trick from last year's Theatre of Blood – allowing Price's baroque, hypersensitive acting style to become the subject of the film – and pusillanimously fritters it away. Where Theatre of Blood employed a properly rhetorical style to give the Price rhetoric room to flower in grandiloquent self-parody, Madhouse descends to a coy, show-biz in-joking. Michael Parkinson gets to chair a chat-show with 'Doctor Death,' and AIP get to run through clips from just about all the Corman-Poe movies as highlights from the Doctor's own screen canon. Inevitably arriving at the duel of the Masters from The Raven. Madhouse finds that particular joke rather hard to cap, its equivalent scene – a quite fitting final conceit in which Price, having stolen Cushing's thunder, sets about stealing his appearance in order to return to the screen – is carried out with little invention or panache."

Author and film critic Leonard Maltin awarded the film 3/4 stars, calling it "Good, if somewhat unimaginative."

Time Out gave the film a mostly positive review, noting its tendency to go over-the-top, but commended the film's interweaving of Price's character Toombes with the actor's actual film career, and "reasonably witty in its use of inter-penetrating fantasies born of the Dream Factory."

Dennis Schwartz from Ozus' World Movie Reviews awarded the film a grade B−, calling it, "Cheesy but enjoyable."

TV Guide awarded the film 1/5 stars, writing, "With its behind-the-scenes setting and focus on an aging star whose glory days are behind him, this could have been a wonderful elegy to the twilight of Price's long career. Unfortunately, the script and direction simply aren't up to the task, and the film becomes an inferior spin-off of Dr. Phibes series. Not even the interaction between Price and Cushing--two very different actors--manages to generate much interest, leaving the clips from Price's Corman-AIP films the best part of the movie."

John Stanley wrote: "Sleazy spooker filmed in London... about a hammy actor (Vincent Price) suspected of committing gore murders during the filming of a TV series. The climax is so unbelievable and forced even horror fans will wonder what's happening. Made by the kind of mentality that thinks the sight of a spider is the height of horror. Eeeekkkkk!"
