= Harvey Hall (actor) =

English television actor (1931–1997)

- Hall in Lust for a Vampire (1971)
- Born: Guthrie Harvey Hallsmith; 27 June 1931; St Columb Minor, Cornwall, England
- Died: 11 April 1997 (aged 65); Truro, Cornwall, England
- Occupations: Television actor, stage producer and director, english teacher

Harvey Hall (27 June 1931 – 11 April 1997) was an English television and film actor. He appeared in many British television series and films, which include Danger Man, Z-Cars, The Masque of the Red Death, Zulu, No Hiding Place, The Avengers, Department S, Out of the Unknown, The Champions, The Vampire Lovers, Lust for a Vampire and others.

In the 1970s he worked as an English teacher at St John's School in Leatherhead and Charterhouse School in Godalming, Surrey. He also produced and directed many plays.

== Acting credits ==
| Title | Year | Role | Notes |
|---|---|---|---|
| The Girl at the Window | 1956 | Waldo | TV movie |
| Good Wives | 1958 | John Brooke | 5 episodes |
| ITV Play of the Week | 1958 | Freddie Perkins | Episode: "Mrs. Dot" |
| Jo's Boys | 1959 | John Brooke | 6 episodes |
| The Adventures of William Tell | 1959 | Heinrich / Heinz | 2 episodes |
| Dixon of Dock Green | 1960 | Hugh Michaels | Episode: "Twinkle, Twinkle, Little Star" |
| The Long Way Home | 1960 | Herr Bauer | 7 episodes |
| Danger Man | 1960-1964 | Frontier Guard / Captain Franz / Maxwell | 3 episodes |
| Paul of Tarsus | 1960 | Festus | Episode: "To Rome" |
| Gorgo | 1961 | Squadron Leader | Film, Uncredited |
| Line of Enquiry | 1961 | Dr. Maurice Carter | TV movie |
| Bonehead | 1961 | Dr. Trevor | Episode: "An Inside Job" |
| The Final Test | 1961 | Bill Jarvis | TV movie |
| Sir Francis Drake | 1961 | Thomas Phillips | Episode: "Queen of Scots" |
| Z-Cars | 1962 | Mr. Forsyth | Episode: "The Best Days" |
| Parbottle Speaking | 1962 | Bill Paley | "Unknown episode" |
| William | 1962 | Hector | Episode: "William and the Parrots" |
| Man of the World | 1962 | Jim Smedley | Episode: "The Runaways" |
| The Bay of St Michel | 1963 | SS Officer | Film |
| The Mouse on the Moon | 1963 | Russian Astronaut | Film |
| Maupassant | 1963 | First Soldier | Episode: "War" |
| West 11 | 1963 | Tenant at Mrs Hartley's Boarding House | Film |
| Zulu | 1964 | Sick Man | Film |
| Madame Bovary | 1964 | Viconte | Episode: "Marriage" |
| The Masque of the Red Death | 1964 | Senor Rivoli | Film, Uncredited |
| The Indian Tales of Rudyard Kipling | 1964 | Captain | Episode: "On the City Wall" |
| Miss Adventure | 1964 | Mark Faulkner | Episode: "Strangers in Paradise: Part 4" |
| Clash by Night | 1964 | Guard Outside Barn | Film, Uncredited |
| Crane | 1964 | Otto | Episode: "The Painted Lady" |
| No Hiding Place | 1965 | Ted Howe | Episode: "The Grass" |
| The Avengers | 1965-1969 | Guard 1 / Heavy / Ulric / The Briefcase | 3 episodes |
| Softly, Softly | 1966 | Edwards | Episode: "Off Beat" |
| Triple Cross | 1966 | Detainee Center Sergeant | Film |
| The Saint | 1966 | Merkin | Episode: "Locate and Destroy" |
| I'll Never Forget What's'isname | 1967 | Charles Maccabee | Film |
| Man in a Suitcase | 1968 | Bates | Episode: "No Friend of Mine" |
| Look and Read | 1968 | Narrator | Voice, 10 episodes |
| Out of the Unknown | 1969 | Al | Episode: "The Little Black Bag" |
| The Champions | 1969 | Poulton | Episode: "Full Circle" |
| Sinister Street | 1969 | Lord Saxby | Episode: "The Parti-Coloured Years" |
| The First Lady | 1969 | Lomax | Episode: "The Whips Are Out" |
| The Spy Killer | 1969 | | TV movie |
| Department S | 1970 | Rogers | Episode: "The Last Train to Redbridge" |
| Hardy Heating Company Ltd | 1970 | John Marsh | 10 episodes |
| The Games | 1970 | Stuart Simmonds | Film |
| The Vampire Lovers | 1970 | Renton | Film |
| Lust for a Vampire | 1971 | Inspector Heinrich | Film |
| Twins of Evil | 1971 | Franz | Film |
| The Persuaders! | 1972 | Col Ivan Ivanov | Episode: "Read and Destroy" |
| Up the Front | 1972 | M.P. | Film |
| The Protectors | 1972 | Freddie Reiwald | Episode: "2,000 Ft to Die." |
| Our Miss Fred | 1972 | German Officer | Film, Uncredited |
| Yellow Dog | 1973 | Alin | Film |
| Don't Just Lie There, Say Something! | 1973 | Thorogood | Film |
| The Sex Thief | 1973 | Jacobi | Film (final film role) |
