= Alcock and Gander =

- Genre: Sitcom
- Created by: Johnnie Mortimer and Brian Cooke
- Starring: Beryl Reid; Richard O'Sullivan; John Cater; Julie Martin
- Country of origin: United Kingdom
- Original language: English
- No. of series: 1
- No. of episodes: 6

Production
- Running time: 30 minutes
- Production company: Thames Television

Original release
- Network: ITV
- Release: 5 June – 10 July 1972

Alcock and Gander is a British sitcom that aired on ITV in 1972. Starring Beryl Reid and Richard O'Sullivan, it lasted for one series. It was written by Johnnie Mortimer and Brian Cooke, who later wrote Man About the House, in which O'Sullivan was the lead male character. It was made for the ITV network by Thames Television.

== Cast ==
- Beryl Reid as Mrs Marigold Alcock
- Richard O'Sullivan as Richard Gander
- John Cater as Ernest
- Julie Martin as Collette

== Plot ==
The series starts as Marigold Alcock inherits her husband's business The Alcock Group of Companies upon his death. The companies, whose headquarters are above a strip club in Soho, include Sotheby's Racing Service Ltd and Hugh Blanding's Detective Agency. The elderly Ernest is her office assistant, while her partner is Richard Gander. He was given partnership in the company after an Alcock Economy Coach Tour went wrong.

== Episodes ==
1. The Safe Breaker (5 June 1972)
2. Husband In A Hurry (12 June 1972)
3. Soho Is Too Small (19 June 1972)
4. Pontoon (26 June 1972)
5. The Strip Club (3 July 1972)
6. Artistic Books, Soho, Ltd (10 July 1972)

== DVD release ==
The Complete Series of Alcock and Gander was released by Network DVD in the UK (Region 2) on 26 November 2012.
