= John Garrie =

British actor

John Garrie, later known as John Garrie Roshi (May 18, 1923 – September 22, 1998), was a British actor who later became a respected teacher of Zen Buddhism.

== Acting career ==
As an actor, John Garrie played minor roles in a number of British television shows during the 1960s and 1970s, including The Avengers, Z-Cars and UFO. He was also a bartender at the Rovers Return Inn on the drama Coronation Street for one episode (Christmas Day, 1963). In the episode of Danger Man entitled "Koroshi", he played the role of an "Old Japanese Man" which foreshadows his later career as a teacher of Zen. He also appeared in the Vincent Price movie Madhouse.

== Meditation teacher ==
John Garrie Roshi's teaching drew on several traditions including Zen, Theravadan, Tibetan Buddhism as well as Taoism and martial arts. He described the mindfulness practice he taught as "Sati", drawing heavily from concepts within Theravadan Buddhist Satipatthana training. He founded the Sati Society which was generally based in the West Country.

John Garrie Roshi wrote a blessing entitled "Peace to all Beings", which was used to introduce and to end meditations. It is still widely used by former and present students of Sati.

== Published works ==
Many of the talks he gave during Satipatthana 'Workshops' were taped and these recordings are available. A collection of his writings was published in print in 1998 under the title The Way is Without Flaw, and published online in 2015.

== Selected filmography ==
- Morgan – A Suitable Case for Treatment (1966) - Tipstaff
- The Mummy's Shroud (1967) - Arab Cleaner (uncredited)
- Far from the Madding Crowd (1967) - Pennyways (uncredited)
- if.... (1968) - Music Master (uncredited)
- The Private Life of Sherlock Holmes (1970) - First Carter
- Madhouse (1974) - Inspector Harper (final film role)
