= Noel Dyson =

English actress (1916–1995)

- Dyson as Ida Barlow in Coronation Street
- Born: Elsie Noel Dyson; 23 December 1916; Newton Heath, Manchester, England
- Died: 29 June 1995 (aged 78); Winchcombe, Gloucestershire, England
- Education: Royal Academy of Dramatic Art
- Occupation: Actress
- Years active: 1938–1995
- Television: Coronation Street
- Spouses: Kenneth Edwards (m. 1949, divorced) Harry Judge (m. 1979)

Elsie Noel Dyson (23 December 1916 – 29 June 1995) was an English character actress.

Dyson played a number of roles in theatre, television and films (including in telemovies) but is best remembered as a versatile character actress in TV serials who became a familiar face to British viewers in a career spanning almost 50 years from 1949 until her death. Dyson's best remembered roles are as matriarch Ida Barlow, one of the original characters in the long-running soap opera Coronation Street (1960–1961) and Nanny in the sitcom Father, Dear Father (1968–1973).

== Early life and career ==
Dyson was born into a wealthy Manchester family (she was given the middle name Noel because she was born two days before Christmas) and was educated at the prestigious Roedean School in Brighton. Following a period at a finishing school in Paris, she returned to England and enrolled at the Royal Academy of Dramatic Art from which she graduated in 1938. She initially performed in repertory companies around Britain, in Birmingham, Oxford and Windsor and elsewhere, before moving on to London's West End.

During the Second World War, Dyson temporarily ceased acting to become a Voluntary Aid Detachment nurse, before returning to the acting profession, initially mainly in stage productions, then from the late 1940s started to become involved with television productions. Dyson's first known TV credit came in a 1949 BBC production The Guinea Pig and for the next decade or so she would appear, mainly in one-off supporting roles, in a number of TV programmes as well as a handful of films. Her most significant roles in this period included seven appearances in the series The Vise (first broadcast in the U.S. between October 1954 and December 1955, but not shown on TV in the UK until 1957-59) and a BBC adaptation of The Secret Garden in 1960.

== Coronation Street ==
In 1960, Dyson was cast in the role of Ida Barlow in the newly commissioned Coronation Street set in a fictional working class district of Salford. Ida was married to Frank Barlow, a postman and had two sons, Ken and David. She was written as a calm-natured, placid character who frequently had to act as mediator between her hot-headed husband and son Ken, whose upwardly-mobile aspirations were seen by Frank as a rejection of his family background.

The initial commission for Coronation Street ran to 13 episodes. The first episode was transmitted on 9 December 1960 and was panned by TV critics, who predicted a short-lived ignominious fate for the programme. However, the series became an instant hit with viewers. By March 1961, Coronation Street was topping the British TV ratings with an estimated 75% of all television-owning households in the UK tuning in, and it was decided to extend its run indefinitely. This proved to be a problem for Dyson, who had only envisaged a limited commitment to the programme. Coronation Street was produced in Manchester by Granada TV while Dyson's home and family were now in London and she did not feel able to commit to ongoing lengthy absences, so when her contract came up for renewal she declined to sign. The programme's producers decided that rather than replacing Dyson with another actress, which they felt would be unpopular with viewers, Ida would be the first regular character to die. No death scene was filmed, but in the episode which was broadcast on 11 September 1961, it was announced that Ida had been knocked down and killed by a bus.

== Later career ==
During the 1960s Dyson continued to appear regularly on TV, but was cast in either one-off productions for strands such as the BBC's The Wednesday Play and ITV's Play of the Week or supporting roles in popular shows such as Z-Cars, Dixon of Dock Green and The Likely Lads. On radio, Dyson stood in for Jessie Matthews in the autumn of 1963 when the latter took a break from The Dales due to illness, with Dyson taking over the part of Mrs Dale.

Dyson took the role of Nanny in the Thames Television sitcom Father, Dear Father which ran for seven series between 1968 and 1973 and also spawned a spin-off film in 1973. Her only other long-running TV role came as the long-suffering wife of Arthur Lowe's character in the sitcom Potter between 1979 and 1983, but she continued to make cameo appearances in many top-rated shows such as Me and My Girl, London's Burning, Bergerac, Prime Suspect and Casualty until shortly before her death. Dyson also appeared as John Hurt's mother in the 1983 film Champions. Her last credit was an episode of Heartbeat, broadcast posthumously in September 1995.

== Personal life and death ==
Dyson married actor Kenneth Edwards in 1949, the marriage later ended in divorce. In 1979, she married school teacher Harry Judge. Until the end of her life, the couple resided in Winchcombe, Gloucestershire. She died of cancer on 29 June 1995, at the age of 78. A service of thanksgiving was held on 2 October 1995 at St Paul's, Covent Garden. The service was officiated by Canon Bill Hall, Senior Chaplain of the Actors' Church Union and attended by many friends, including William G. Stewart, with a reading from Judge. Judge died in 2003, at the age of 90.

== Filmography ==
Year	Title	Role	Notes
1949	The Guinea Pig	Mrs Read	TV movie
1950	Chance of a Lifetime	Tea Lady	Uncredited
1951	The Concert	Miss Vesey	TV movie
1952	Emil and the Detectives	Mrs Tichburn	Episode: "The Man in the Bowler Hat"
1952	Huckleberry Finn	Aunt Polly	Episode: "Back to the River"
1953	Stranger in the House	Mrs Benfield	TV movie
1953	Seven Women	Mrs Tovey	TV movie
1954	Eight O'Clock Walk	Gallery Regular	
1954	Bless this House	Mrs Bevan	TV movie
1954	The Gay Dog	Lecturer	
1955	Patrol Car	Cora	Episode: "Written in the Dust"
1955	The Women on the Beach	Madame Suzette	TV movie
1956	A Girl Called Jo	Mrs March	TV movie
1956	Non de Plume	Queen of Bavaria	Episode: "The Courtesan"
1956	Adventure Theatre		Episode: "The Wilful Widow"
1956	Tomorrow May Be Fine	Anne Wright	TV movie
1956	Bill Radford: Reporter	Mrs Barry	Episode: "Missing from Home"
1956	Joan and Leslie	Mrs Henshaw	TV series
1957	Scotland Yard (film series) ('The Lonely House' episode)	English Spinster	Short (January release; filmed 1956)
1957	Dick and the Duchess	Pamela Culberson	Episode: "The Hospital"
1957–1959	The Vise	Emma Pine / Ella / Stella / Mrs Mayes / Princess Dariana / Jean / Mrs Watson	7 episodes
1958	ITV Television Playhouse	Meg Cooper	Episode: "The Voyagers"
1958	Private Investigator	Mrs Landon	Episode: "The Villa St. Yves"
1958	The Voyagers	Meg Cooper	TV movie
1959	Three Crooked Men		Uncredited
1959	Emergency Ward 10	Mrs Haines	2 episodes
1959	The Gay Dog	Maggie Gay	TV movie
1951–1959	BBC Sunday Night Theatre	Boney / Mrs. Ellis	2 episodes
1959	Probation Officer	Mrs West	1 episode
1959	The Young Lady From London	Pamela Hamilton-Huntley	1 episode
1959	Please Turn Over	Mrs Brent	
1959–1966	ITV Play of the Week	Laura Priolleau / Mrs. Tartleton / Anne / MrsForbes / Mrs Phillips / Isabel	6 episodes
1960	The Secret Garden	Mrs Sowerby	4 episodes
1960	Carry On Constable	Vague Woman	
1960	Man from Interpol	Countess Salon / Martha	2 episodes
1960	Annual Outing	Maud Higgins	TV movie
1960	Saturday Playhouse	Miss Minney / Maud Higgins	2 episodes
1960–1961	Coronation Street	Ida Barlow	41 episodes
1961	Jacks and Knaves	Alice Hitchins	Episode: "The Great Art Robbery"
1961	The Middle Course	Maria Gerard	
1962	The Silent Invasion	MM Veroux	
1962	Studio 4	Dorrie Robinson	Episode: "Look Who's Talking"
1962	Z-Cars	Elsie Heskeith	Episode: "The Best Days"
1962	No Hiding Place	Landlady	Episode: "Unfinished Business"
1962–1963	BBC Sunday-Night Play	Mrs Peck / Alice Preston / Mrs Woodbridge	3 episodes
1962–1964	Compact	Mrs Jean Henderson	4 episodes
1963	The Odd Man	Mother Eve	Episode: "The Double Image of Mother Eve"
1963	Gutter Girls	Muriel Donahue	
1963	Carry On Cabby	District Nurse	
1964	First Night	Gracie	Episode: "The Bedmakers"
1964	The Villains	Flo	2 episodes
1964	Taxi!	Sandra's mum	Episode: "Two-Five-Two"
1964–1965	Thursday Theatre	Annie Parker / Rhoda Lucas	2 episodes
1964–1966	Sergeant Cork	Mrs. Bellamy / Mrs. Stebens	2 episodes
1965	Gideon's Way	Mrs Lane	Episode: "Subway to Revenge"
1965	Londoners	Vesta Bardell	Episode: "A Little Touch of Henry"
1965	Comedy Playhouse		Episode: "Hudd"
1965	Jury Room	Mrs Whiteside - The Juror	Episode: "The Chess Player"
1965	Dixon of Dock Green	Mrs Egan	Episode: "Act of Violence"
1965	Theatre 625	Emma Moxen	Episode: "Portraits from the North: Bruno"
1966	The Likely Lads	Mrs Perrin	Episode: "Friends and Neighbours"
1966	Press for Time	Mrs Corcoran	
1965–1966	Meet the Wife	Cousin Olive	2 episodes
1967	Turn Out The Lights	Mrs. Wennington	Episode: "One for Yes, Two for No"
1967	The Newcomers	Mrs Wilberforce	1 episode
1967	Mister Ten Per Cent	Mrs Gorman	
1968	Softly, Softly	Anne Anderson	Episode: "The Good Girl"
1968	The First Lady	Betty Haynes	Episode: "Worked Out"
1968	Scene	Mrs. Smith	TV series documentary
1968-1980	ITV Playhouse	Mrs. Rankling / Clara Dixon	2 episodes
1968–1973	Father, Dear Father	Nanny	45 episodes
1969	Hark at Barker		Episode: "Meet Lord Rustless"
1969	Fraud Squad	Mrs. Keever	Episode: "The Biggest Borrower of All"
1969	The Wednesday Play	Mrs. Dyson	Episode: "The Last Train through Harecastle Tunnel"
1969	All Star Comedy Carnival	Nanny	TV movie
1970	The Main Chance	Janet Harrison	Episode: "A View from the Chair"
1970	Play for Today	Jane Budd	Episode: "A Distant Thunder"
1971	The Ronnie Barker Yearbook		TV movie
1971	Persuasion	Mrs. Musgrove	3 episodes
1972	Thirty-Minute Theatre (TV series)	Mrs. Proctor / Mrs. Trant	2 episodes
1972–1985	The Two Ronnies	Jacks wife / Rose Spooner / Woman with Dog / Mrs. Thompson	4 episodes
1973	Father, Dear Father	Nanny	
1974	Whatever Happened to the Likely Lads?	Mrs. Chambers	Episode: "Heart to Heart"
1974	Late Night Drama	Kitty	Episode: "Silver Wedding"
1976	...And Mother Makes Five	Auntie Betty	Episode: "Love Is a Most Confounded Thing"
1976	The Molly Wopsies	Mrs. James	Episode: "Arrowing Times"
1977	Jackanory Playhouse	Miss Jordan	Episode: "The Apple of Discord"
1977	Second City Firsts	Patricia	Episode: "Waifs and Strays"
1978	An Englishman's Castle	Mrs. Worth	3 episodes
1979	Secret Orchards	Netta Ackerley	TV movie
1979	BBC2 Playhouse	Mrs. Fly	Episode: "Virginia Fly Is Drowning"
1979–1983	Potter	Aileen Potter	20 episodes
1983	Partners in Crime	Mrs. Kingston Bruce	Episode: "The Affair of the Pink Pearl"
1984	Love and Marriage	Mrs. Rodgers	Episode: "A Matter of Will"
1984	Champions	Mrs Champion	
1985	Summer Season	Mrs. Nesbit	Episode: "Paris"
1986	The Practice	Ada Fielding	1 episode
1986	The Life and Loves of a She-Devil	Brenda	2 episodes
1986–1987	All in Good Faith	Barbara Lambe	2 episodes
1987	Me and My Girl	Winifred Spalding	Episode: "A Star Is Gorn"
1987	C.A.T.S. Eyes	Old Lady	Episode: "A Naval Affair"
1987	Rainbow	Mrs. Smith	Episode: "Borrowing"
1988	London's Burning	Mrs. Sims	1 episode
1988	Executive Stress	Miss Pledger	1 episode
1989	May to December	Mrs. Arlett	Episode: "Anything You Can Do"
1990	Bergerac	Mrs. Williams	Episode: "My Name's Sergeant Bergerac"
1990	Never the Twain	Vera	Episode: "Happy Holiday"
1991	Prime Suspect	Mrs. Tennison	Episode: "Price to Pay: Part 1"
1993	Casualty	Mary	Episode: "Getting Involved"
1994	The Knock	Barbara Simmons	2 episodes
1994	Super Grass	Gran	Short
1995	Heartbeat	Netty Pickard	Episode: "Wishing Well"
