= Father, Dear Father (film) =

1973 British comedy by William G. Stewart

- Theatrical film poster
- Directed by: William G. Stewart
- Written by: Brian Cooke; Johnnie Mortimer
- Produced by: Peter J. Thompson
- Starring: Patrick Cargill; Natasha Pyne; Ann Holloway; Noel Dyson; Joyce Carey; Richard O'Sullivan
- Cinematography: Alan Hume
- Edited by: Timothy Gee
- Music by: Nachum Heiman
- Production companies: Sedgemoor Film Productions; M.M. Film Productions
- Distributed by: J. Arthur Rank Film Distributors
- Release date: May 1973 (UK)
- Running time: 99 minutes
- Country: United Kingdom
- Language: English

Father, Dear Father is a 1973 British comedy film directed by William G. Stewart and starring Patrick Cargill. It was based on the Thames Television sitcom of the same title. The story is based on episodes from series 1 and 2.

== Plot ==
Patrick feels his daughters need a mother so he decides to marry his agent Georgie, only then mistakenly to propose to the cleaning lady.

== Cast ==
Some of the cast is different from the television series:

- Patrick Cargill as Patrick Glover
- Noel Dyson as Nanny
- Natasha Pyne as Anna
- Ann Holloway as Karen
- Ursula Howells as Barbara (Patrick's Ex Wife)
- Jack Watling as Bill (her husband)
- Donald Sinden as Phillip (Patrick's brother)
- Jill Melford as Georgie Thompson (his agent)
- Beryl Reid as Mrs Stoppard (Georgie's cleaning woman)
- Joseph O'Conor as vicar
- Richard O'Sullivan as Richard (Anna's boyfriend)
- Joyce Carey as Patrick's mother
- Elizabeth Adare as Maggie
- Clifton Jones as Larry (her husband)
- Jo-Jo the dog as H.G.Wells

== Critical reception ==
The Monthly Film Bulletin wrote: "'With its scatterbrained but essentially "nice" bourgeois family who appear to encounter the working classes only in the shape of comic chars and milkmen, Father Dear Father runs along grooves largely abandoned by the cinema by the end of the Fifties but still travelled by many a television series. Structurally, too, the film betrays its origins, in that after a good deal of confusion, the ending brings all the characters safely back to the point at which they started. The plot limps from one cliché to another via the familiar devices of crossed purposes and mistaken identity, while the doggedly trivial banter of the dialogue becomes increasingly wearing as the film progresses."

Sky Movies called it a "so-so comedy film version of the successful TV sitcom."
