= Patrick Cargill =

English actor (1918–1996)

- Born: Edward Sydney Patrick Cargill; 3 June 1918; Bexhill-on-Sea, Sussex, England
- Died: 23 May 1996 (aged 77); Richmond, London, England
- Occupation: Actor

Edward Sydney Patrick Cargill (3 June 1918 – 23 May 1996) was an English actor known for his television and film roles, including the lead role in the British television sitcom Father, Dear Father.

== Early life ==
Cargill was born to middle-class parents living in Bexhill-on-Sea, Sussex. After education at Haileybury College, he made his debut in the Bexhill Amateur Theatrical Society. However, he was aiming for a military career and was selected for training at the Royal Military Academy at Sandhurst. Cargill became a commissioned officer in the British Indian Army.

== Career ==
After the Second World War ended, Cargill returned to Britain to focus on a stage career, and joined Anthony Hawtrey's company at Buxton, Croydon and later the Embassy Theatre at Swiss Cottage in London. He became a supporting player in John Counsell's repertory at Windsor alongside Brenda Bruce and Beryl Reid and scored a huge hit in the revue The World's the Limit, which was seen by the Queen and 26 of her guests one evening. He made his first West End appearance in 1953 in Ian Carmichael's revue High Spirits at the London Hippodrome. He also co-wrote the stage play Ring for Catty, with Jack Beale. The second of the Carry On films, Carry On Nurse, produced in 1959, was based on this play as was the 1962 film Twice Round the Daffodils.

After a number of other West End roles he was cast as Bernard in Boeing Boeing at the Apollo Theatre in 1962. The farce, which was ideal for Cargill, drew the attention of major producers led to him starring in Say Who You Are at Her Majesty's Theatre in 1965 and directing Not Now Darling by Ray Cooney and John Chapman at the Strand Theatre in 1968.

=== Television ===
Cargill first came to TV notice when playing Sergeant Cuff in the 1959 series The Moonstone.

In 1960, Cargill played Gestapo agent Herr Grosnitz in the BBC TV series The Long Way Home. He also performed on several occasions with Tony Hancock, twice in Hancock's final BBC television series, including a role as the doctor who clashes with him in the well-known episode "The Blood Donor" (1961). In 1961–62 he featured as the regular character Miguel Garetta in all 26 episodes of the British spy series Top Secret, and in 1962 he played Herr Straffen in The Last Man Out, a TV series by Shaun Sutton, followed two years later by a major part of an episode of The Avengers TV series. In 1967, he appeared in two episodes of The Prisoner as an unusually cruel and brutal Number Two in "Hammer Into Anvil", and as a colleague from Number Six's pre-Village days in "Many Happy Returns".

Cargill starred in three television series of Feydeau farces, adapted by Ned Sherrin and Caryl Brahms and entitled Ooh La La! (1968–1973), which were shown on BBC 2. These vignette Feydeau farces were originally intended to provide variety for Parisian audiences who were used to more than one production during an evening's entertainment. The third and final series showcased Feydeau's longer pieces. Brahms and Sherrin turned six of their adaptations into book form, and published it as Ooh! La-La! in 1973, with a dedication: "To Patrick Cargill – First among Farceurs".

In 1968, Cargill starred in Father, Dear Father on ITV (written specifically for him) as Patrick Glover, a thriller writer and an inept father of two teenage daughters, played by Natasha Pyne (Anna) and Ann Holloway (Karen). The show ran until 1973 and was produced and directed by William G. Stewart.

Many performers who had worked before with the actor featured in an entertainment special called Patrick, Dear Patrick, An Evening with Patrick Cargill and His Guests (1972). Cargill was a friend of Patrick Macnee from their early acting days, and Macnee returned from California to make a guest appearance on the show. It included both Patricks singing "Mad Dogs and Englishmen". Cargill's companion, Vernon Page, recounts that at the time of casting Cargill wanted to sing this duet with Sir Noël Coward and even visited him at the hotel in London where he was staying in an attempt to persuade him to appear, but Coward was either unwilling or unable to agree to the request and he died 15 months later. This one-off special production by Thames Television also guest-starred Beryl Reid, with whom Cargill sang the duet "I Remember It Well" by Alan Jay Lerner and Frederick Loewe (from Gigi). Cargill added a new response to the line "We drank champagne" (Cargill's line): "You gave me Coke, you drank the wine yourself, you soak!" (Reid's riposte).

In 1976, Cargill returned to the TV screens with The Many Wives of Patrick, playing a middle-aged playboy and antiques dealer, Patrick Woodford, who is trying to divorce his sixth wife to remarry his first. This series showcased many prominent stars such as Patrick Macnee and Dawn Addams. The 1980s was something of a revival for Cargill's natural talent at farce. He co-starred in Key for Two with Moira Lister at the Vaudeville Theatre and then at the Old Vic Theatre in William Douglas-Home's After the Ball is Over. In 1986, he starred with Frankie Howerd in A Funny Thing Happened on the Way to the Forum at the Chichester Festival Theatre, in which he played the part of Senex.

In his final years, Cargill was seen in Captain Beaky at the Playhouse in 1990 and after that he toured in Derek Nimmo's British Airways Playhouse. He also played British Prime Minister Neville Chamberlain in the 1990 British Sitcom Heil Honey I'm Home, which was cancelled after one episode. For the centenary staging of Charley's Aunt in 1992, Cargill played the part of the dreaded Spettigue.

=== Films ===
His film appearances included An Alligator Named Daisy and Expresso Bongo; two of the Carry On films: Carry On Regardless and Carry On Jack; Help! (1965) starring The Beatles, The Magic Christian (1969) with Peter Sellers and Ringo Starr and Charlie Chaplin's A Countess from Hong Kong, in which he played the part of the butler, Hudson.

=== Music ===
A lesser known detail of Cargill's showbusiness career is the handful of recordings that he made in the 1960s and 1970s. The first was an album called Father, Dear Father (1969) in which Cargill sang a medley of songs. The female voice on the album was not Noel Dyson (Nanny) but that of June Hunt, a friend of Cargill.

He followed this with three singles. One called "Father, Dear Father Christmas" and another called "Thinking Young" and the final single called "Father, Dear Father." None of these recordings was commercially successful.

Cargill appeared as Sir Joseph Porter in H.M.S. Pinafore at the Queen Elizabeth Hall in August 1983.

== Personal life ==
Cargill was a private man, who did not relish his celebrity status, though he was always kind to fans who approached him. He would shun awards ceremonies in favour of a quiet evening at home playing mahjong. From the mid-1960s, Cargill lived at Sheen Gate Gardens, Richmond on Thames. In the later years of his life, he lived in Henley-on-Thames. He spent time at Spring Cottage, his country retreat situated in Warren Lane, near Cross-in-Hand, East Sussex. The love of his life was his Bentley, a black and dark green model of which only six were ever made. Cargill also had a Mini and often told a story about driving through Barnes one day and on seeing one of the other five Bentley dropheads at the traffic lights, waved furiously at the driver, only to realise that he was driving his Mini that day. In the mid-1980s, he changed the Bentley for a Rolls-Royce. Cargill's many pets included a monkey, a parrot, a wether and his favourites, Ra, a cross-border collie and Charles, a cat that lived at Spring Cottage.

For many years, Cargill was companions with Vernon Page, an eccentric landscape gardener, poet and lampoon songwriter, until Page married in 1984. In his later years he was companion with James Camille Markowski. After his death, it was alleged that Cargill was homosexual but he never made any public acknowledgment of such. It was claimed that while lunching with Ray Cooney, Cargill observed, when a waiter removed his soup spoon, "Aah, look Ray, the dish has run away with the spoon."

=== Death ===
At the time of his death at the age of 77, Cargill was suffering from a brain tumour and was being nursed in a hospice in Richmond on Thames, London. In 1995, the year before he died, Cargill had been struck by a car in Australia; though he was only slightly injured, this accident led to false reports that the cause of his death was a hit-and-run accident.

== Filmography ==
Year	Title	Role	Notes
1949	Trottie True	Party Guest	Uncredited
1953	The Sword and the Rose	French Diplomat	
1955	An Alligator Named Daisy	Steward	Uncredited
1956	The Extra Day	Cashier No. 1	
1956	The Baby and the Battleship	Navigation Officer	Uncredited
1956	Around the World in 80 Days	Minor Role	Uncredited
1958	Up the Creek	Commander	
1959	The Night We Dropped a Clanger	Fritz	
1959	Expresso Bongo	A Psychiatrist	Uncredited
1960	Doctor in Love	Car Salesman	Uncredited
1961	Carry On Regardless	Raffish Customer	
1961	Clue of the Silver Key	Binny	Edgar Wallace Mysteries
1963	The Cracksman	Museum Guide	
1963	A Stitch in Time	Dr. Meadows	
1963	The Hi-Jackers	Inspector Grayson	
1964	This Is My Street	Ransome	
1964	Carry On Jack	Don Luis, the Spanish Governor	
1965	Help!	Superintendent Gluck	
1967	A Countess from Hong Kong	Hudson	
1968	Inspector Clouseau	Commissioner Sir Charles Braithwaite	
1968	Hammerhead	Condor	
1969	The Magic Christian	Auctioneer at Sotheby's	
1970	Every Home Should Have One	Wallace Trufitt M.P.	
1971	Up Pompeii	Nero	
1973	Father Dear Father	Patrick Glover	
1974	The Cherry Picker	Dr. Harrison	
1977	The Picture Show Man	Fitzwilliam	
1990	Heil Honey I'm Home!	Neville Chamberlain	

== Sources ==
- Brahms, Caryl; Ned Sherrin (1973). Ooh! La-La!. London: W. H. Allen. ISBN 978-0-491-01091-7.
