= The Long Way Home (TV series) =

1960 British TV wartime drama series

- Genre: Drama
- Written by: Shaun Sutton
- Starring: Barry Letts; James Sharkey; Nigel Arkwright; Patrick Cargill; Harvey Hall
- Country of origin: United Kingdom
- Original language: English
- No. of series: 1
- No. of episodes: 7 (1 missing)

Production
- Producer: Shaun Sutton
- Editor: Ron de Mattos
- Running time: 25 minutes

Original release
- Network: BBC Television Service
- Release: 24 April – 5 June 1960

The Long Way Home is a 1960 British wartime drama series written and produced by Shaun Sutton and starring future Doctor Who producer Barry Letts.

== Overview ==
During the Second World War, four British officers escape from German POW camp, Oflag 43 and make their way to the Spanish frontier unaware the Gestapo has allowed the officers to escape because one of them is a German agent. The Gestapo plan to use the officers to lead them to the French resistance in order to discover the escape network and destroy it.

== Cast ==
- Barry Letts as Lieutenant Anson
- James Sharkey as Captain Miller
- Nigel Arkwright as Captain Gill
- Patrick Cargill as Herr Grosnitz
- Harvey Hall as Herr Bauer
- Neil Wilson as Commissioned Gunner Parks, RN
- Derek Francis as Gaston Rondeur
- Frazer Hines as Philippe Rondeur
- Nanette Newman as Marie
- Peter Hempson as Rene

Guest stars include Arthur Lowe, Jack Smethurst, Brian Cant, Roger Delgado, William Mervyn, Ivor Salter, Pauline Letts and John Woodnutt.

== Episodes ==
No.	Title	Original release date	Archive status
1	"The Tunnel"	24 April 1960	Exists
2	"The First Lap"	1 May 1960	Missing
3	"The French Resistance"	8 May 1960	Exists
4	"Cross Country Run"	15 May 1960	Exists
5	"The Boathouse"	22 May 1960	Exists
6	"The Spanish Frontier"	29 May 1960	Exists
7	"Over the Line"	5 June 1960	Exists

== Missing episode and Availability ==
Only episode 2 is missing, the 6 surviving episodes are available on YouTube.
