= Jill Melford =

British actress (1931–2018)

- Born: 23 November 1931; London, England
- Died: 21 February 2018 (aged 86); Lister Hospital, Chelsea, London, England
- Occupation: Actress
- Spouse: John Standing (m. 1961; div. 1972)
- Children: 1

Jill Melford (23 November 1931 – 21 February 2018) was an English actress.

== Early career ==
Born in 1931, she was the daughter of the actor Jack Melford. She attended the Ballet Arts School in New York and made her theatre debut in 1949 as a dancer in a production of Oklahoma! in New York, before appearing in other Broadway performances. In 1953, she performed in The Seven Year Itch on the London stage, she played Miss Nardis in the 1954 British crime drama film Murder by Proxy and later appeared in other stage plays. These include Auntie Mame, Ulysses in Night-time, The Life of the Party, The Right Honourable Gentleman, There's a Girl in My Soup, Not Now, Darling, Best of Friends and The Chairman. She has been described as "a tall, attractive redhead".

== Television and movies ==
Melford made her first UK television appearance in 1952 in The Three Hostages and her first movie, Will Any Gentleman...? in 1953 not long afterwards. In 1963, she starred with Norman Wisdom in the film comedy A Stitch in Time. Although she did not appear in the long running comedy series Father, Dear Father on UK ITV, Melford played the role of Georgie Thompson in the 1973 movie version and later had a recurring role as executive Toni Ross in the long running ITV soap Crossroads. She made several appearances in Danger Man (known as Secret Agent in the USA), “Sergeant Cork” (1963) and Taggart in 1993. Her other film credits included roles in The Servant (1963), Hot Enough for June (1964), Bunny Lake is Missing (1965), The Vengeance of She (1968), I Want What I Want (1972), The Greek Tycoon (1978), The Bitch (1979), Hussy (1980) and Edge of Sanity (1989). She made her last film appearance in Shoreditch in 2003.

== Personal life ==
She was married to actor John Standing in 1961, they had a son called Alexander in 1965, and they divorced in 1972.
