= The Stranger's Hand =

1954 film

- Directed by: Mario Soldati
- Written by: Giorgio Bassani; Guy Elmes
- Based on: The Stranger's Hand by Graham Greene
- Produced by: Angelo Rizzoli; Graham Greene; Peter Moore; John Stafford
- Starring: Trevor Howard; Alida Valli; Richard Basehart
- Cinematography: Enzo Serafin
- Edited by: Tom Simpson; Leslie Hogdson; Leo Catozzo
- Music by: Nino Rota; Alessandro Cicognini
- Production companies: Milo Film; Rizzoli Film; Independent Film Producers
- Distributed by: British Lion Films
- Release date: 20 January 1954
- Running time: 85 minutes
- Countries: Italy; United Kingdom
- Language: English
- Budget: £164,200

The Stranger's Hand (Italian: La mano dello straniero) is a 1954 British-Italian thriller drama film directed by Mario Soldati and starring Trevor Howard, Alida Valli and Richard Basehart. An international co-production, it is based on the draft treatment with the same name written by Graham Greene. The plot follows the son of a British MI5 agent kidnapped in Venice by agents of Yugoslavia as he searches for his father.

Greene used a pseudonym to enter the first two chapters of The Stranger's Hand in a competition organized by the New Statesman which called for submissions in the style of Graham Greene. His entry won second prize. Soldati saw the chapters and persuaded Greene to complete the story to serve as the basis for a film. Greene expanded it to 30 pages of a "film story", and Giorgio Bassani and Guy Elmes used Greene's work as the basis for their screenplay.

In the New York Times, Bosley Crowther enjoyed the film's use of situations and themes typical of Greene, but thought Soldati allowed the story to "sag like a slack rope".

== Cast ==
- Trevor Howard as Major Roger Court
- Richard O'Sullivan as Roger Court, his son
- Alida Valli as Roberta Gleukovitch
- Richard Basehart as Joe Hamstringer
- Eduardo Ciannelli as Dr. Vivaldi
- Arnoldo Foà as Police Commissioner
- Stephen Murray as the British Consul in Venice
- Guido Celano as the Chief Constable
- Nerio Bernardi as Vincenzo
- Giorgio Costantini as Pescovitch
- Angelo Cecchelin as Luza
- Nino Vechina as First Killer
- Armando Papette as Second Killer
- Giovanni Karuz as Third Killer
- Joan Butterfield as Mrs. Harrington
- Alessandro Paulon as Morgan
- Remington Olmsted as Ramondo

== Bibliography ==
- Spicer, Andrew. Historical Dictionary of Film Noir. Scarecrow Press, 2010.
