= Natasha Pyne =

British actress (born 1946)

- Born: 9 July 1946 (age 79); Crawley, Sussex, England
- Occupation: Actress
- Years active: 1963–2007
- Spouse: Paul Copley (m. 1972)

Natasha Pyne (born 9 July 1946) is an English actress who starred in The Taming of the Shrew (1967 film), The Breaking of Bumbo (1970) and Father, Dear Father (1973).

== Early life ==
Pyne was born in Crawley, Sussex on 9 July 1946. She is descended from a sister of Empress Eugénie, the wife of French emperor Napoleon III. Her father was a military attaché to the British embassy in Rome and she attended a private school in London. She went to a comprehensive school in Fulham, Hurlingham School, for the latter part of her education.

== Career ==
=== Theatre ===
Pyne began her stage acting career at the Royal Court in a production of John Osborne's Inadmissible Evidence in 1964 Pyne played Ophelia in a Charles Marowitz's adaptation of Shakespeare's 'Hamlet' at the Open Space Theatre at Tottenham Court Road in July 1969. Pyne starred in the Denise Coffey directed production of Brandon Thomas's Charley's Aunt and Oscar Wilde's The Importance of being Earnest at the Young Vic in 1977. She returned to the Royal Court in 1990 in Robert Holman's Rafts and Dreams.

=== Film and TV ===
In early 1963, Pyne had a leading role in the BBC Saturday early evening children's drama serial The Chem. Lab. Mystery. She appeared as Bianca in the Elizabeth Taylor and Richard Burton film The Taming of the Shrew in 1967, alongside Michael York. and her other film roles include The Breaking of Bumbo (1970), Madhouse (1973) with Vincent Price, and the Disney British film One of Our Dinosaurs is Missing (1975) as Susan, a young nanny. She appeared in an episode of Jason King and also The Adventurer with Gene Barry. She is best known for her role as Anna Glover in the British television sitcom Father, Dear Father, which ran from 1968 to 1973. Made by Thames Television, the series featured Patrick Cargill as her father, and Pyne reprised her role in the 1973 film version. Her later appearances were mostly in television dramas such as The Bill. Pyne has also been in many Radio 4 plays. In 2007, she made a guest appearance in the Doctor Who audio play I.D..

== Personal life ==
She married the actor Paul Copley in 1972, having performed with him in a 1971 production in Leeds of Frank Wedekind's Lulu, directed by Peter Barnes.

== Filmography ==
=== Film ===
- The Devil-Ship Pirates (1964)
- The Idol (1966)
- Who Killed the Cat? (1966)
- The Taming of the Shrew (1967)
- The Breaking of Bumbo (1970)
- Father, Dear Father (1973)
- Madhouse (1973)
- One of Our Dinosaurs is Missing (1975)

=== Radio work ===
She was in BBC's Radio Drama Company (RDC) in the mid-1980s and appeared in numerous Radio 4 plays and readings. She also appeared in Drama on 3 and Children's BBC Radio 5 (former).

- Whale Music (play) (Anthony Minghella) (1986)
- Father Brown - The Curse of the Gold Cross (1986)
- The Clockmaker of Cordoba (1986)
- All's Well That Ends Well (1986)
- Searching The Ashes (1986)
- The Making Of Frankenstein (1986)
- Afternoon Play - The Cotswold Order (1986), as Dorkas
- Count Omega (1987)
- The Demon Headmaster (1990)
- The Secret Garden (1991)
- Mrs Donaldson at sixty (1991)
- The Wizard of Oz (1994)
- The Secret Life of my Aunt Fanny (1994)
- Thirty Minute Theatre – An Afterlife (1995)
- Afternoon Play – Love To Hate (written by Wally K. Daly) (2000)
- Afternoon Play – Ruth Ellis the son's story (2000)
- Afternoon Play – Best Of Luck, Phyllis Diller (2005)

=== Television ===
She was in Van der Valk when it was revived once again towards the end of Thames' life as a part of the ITV network, with four two-hour episodes of the fourth series in January and February 1991, and the fifth series three two-hour episodes in February 1992.

- Silas Marner (1964)
- The Wednesday Play – A Hero of Our Time (1966)
- Mystery and Imagination – Carmilla (1966)
- Haunted – "Through a Glass Darkly" (1968)
- Father Dear Father (1968–73)
- Jason King (1972)
- The Adventurer (1972)
- Play For Today – A Brush with Mr Porter on the Road to Eldorado (1981)
- Van der Valk (1991–92)
- Cadfael (1998)
- The Bill (2000s (decade))
