= Trouble in Mind (TV series) =

British sitcom (ITV, 1991)

- Genre: Situation comedy
- Created by: Greg Brennan
- Written by: Colin Bostock-Smith; Tony Millan; Mike Walling
- Directed by: Terry Kinane
- Starring: Richard O'Sullivan; Susan Penhaligon; Nicholas Day; Jim McManus
- Theme music composer: Richard O'Sullivan; Laurie Holloway
- Country of origin: United Kingdom
- Original language: English
- No. of series: 1
- No. of episodes: 9

Production
- Executive producer: Robin Carr
- Producer: Al Mitchell
- Production locations: London, England
- Running time: 25 minutes
- Production company: LWT

Original release
- Network: ITV
- Release: 24 February – 14 July 1991

Trouble in Mind is a short-lived British television sitcom series produced by LWT for ITV in 1991. It ran for nine episodes, each 25 minutes long. The series starred Richard O'Sullivan as a psychiatrist, Susan Penhaligon as his landscape gardener wife, Nicholas Day, and Jim McManus. It has been reshown on Forces TV and Rewind TV.

== Cast ==
- Richard O'Sullivan as Adam Charlesworth
- Susan Penhaligon as Julia Charlesworth
- Nicholas Day as Dr. Malcolm Barclay
- Jim McManus as Stanley Chambers
