= Harriet's Back in Town =

Television series

Harriet's Back in Town is a 1972 British television series produced by Thames Television.

The cast included Pauline Yates, William Russell, Edwin Richfield and Sally Bazely.

The show featured a newly divorced woman (Harriet Preston, played by Pauline Yates) and her plans for her new life. The first episode was shown on October 17, 1972 and the last (the 104th) exactly one year later on October 17, 1973. Most weeks featured two episodes on consecutive days. Pauline Yates would later star as Elizabeth Perrin in The Fall and Rise of Reginald Perrin.

The show also featured Geoffrey Hayes (later to find fame in the children's show Rainbow) as a taxi driver in two episodes.

== Cast ==
=== Main / regular ===
- Pauline Yates as Harriet Preston
- William Russell as Tom Preston
- Doran Godwin as Dorothy
- Miranda Bell as Jane Preston
- Sally Bazely as Helen Chapman
- Edwin Richfield as Frank Chapman
- Carole Mowlam as Margaret Foster (16 episodes)

=== Guests / recurring ===
- Christopher Strauli as Chris Pearson (14 episodes)
- Barry Quin as Tarquin Melville (8 episodes)
- Rachel Davies as Buzz (6 episodes)
- Gary Raymond as Andrew Fland (6 episodes)
- Richard Vernon as Oliver Warburton (6 episodes)
- Judy Matheson as Sarah Chivers (4 episodes)
- Peter Blythe as James Armitage (4 episodes)
- John Barron as Peter Ward (4 episodes)
- Julian Holloway as Gerald Winston (4 episodes)
- Vincent Ball as Kenneth Hammond (4 episodes)
- Sue Holderness as Jennifer Grant (2 episodes)
- Colin Baker as Mike Baker (2 episodes)
- Madeline Smith as Diane (2 episodes)
- Peter Bowles as Jack (2 episodes)
- James Cossins as Arthur (2 episodes)
- Jenny Lee-Wright as Jo (2 episodes)
- Christopher Malcolm as Benjamin Finch (2 episodes)
- Jan Harvey as Secretary (2 episodes)
- Kathryn Leigh Scott as Louisa Vernon (2 episodes)
- Elizabeth Bell
- Geoffrey Hayes as Taxi Driver (2 episodes)
- Veronica Lang as Louise Wimbourne (2 episodes)
