= Madame Bovary (1975 TV series) =

- Genre: Period drama
- Based on: Madame Bovary by Gustave Flaubert
- Written by: Giles Cooper
- Directed by: Rodney Bennett
- Starring: Francesca Annis; Tom Conti
- Composer: Dudley Simpson
- Country of origin: United Kingdom
- Original language: English
- No. of series: 1
- No. of episodes: 4

Production
- Producer: Richard Beynon
- Running time: 55 minutes
- Production company: BBC

Original release
- Network: BBC Two
- Release: 22 September – 12 October 1975

Madame Bovary is a British period television series, based on the novel of the same title by Gustave Flaubert. It originally aired in four episodes on BBC 2 in 1975.

== Cast ==
- Francesca Annis as Emma Bovary
- Tom Conti as Charles Bovary
- Gabrielle Lloyd as Felicite
- Ray Smith as Homais
- Brian Stirner as Leon Dupuis
- David Waller as Father Bournisien
- John Cater as Lheureux
- Kathleen Helme as Madame Bovary, Charles' mother
- Ivor Roberts as Guillaumin
- Stephen Bent as Justin
- Denis Lill as Rodolphe Boulanger
- Michael Poole as Dr. Canivet
- Bernard Taylor as Girard
- John Tordoff as Hippolyte
- Richard Beale as M. Rouault
- James Bree as Beadle
- Antony Carrick as Clerk
- Ysanne Churchman as Heloise
- Oliver Gilbert as Guest at ball
- Amanda Grinling as Madame Homais
- Nicola Hamilton as Guest at ball
- Nicholas Hawtrey as Vicomte
- Jack Le White as Louis
- Elizabeth Proud as Nastasie
- Peter Rutherford as Guest at ball
- Mike Savage as Bertrand
- Gladys Spencer as Guest at ball
- John Sterland as Lieuvain
- William Thomas as Albert

== Bibliography ==
- Roberts, Jerry. Encyclopedia of Television Film Directors. Scarecrow Press, 2009.
