= John Sterland =

- Born: Jonathan Maunder Sterland; 1927; Winnipeg, Manitoba, Canada
- Died: 21 December 2017 (age 89)
- Occupation: Actor
- Spouse: June Bailey
- Children: Ben Sterland; Emma Sterland; Oliver Sterland

Jonathan Maunder "John" Sterland was a Canadian film and television actor.

Sterland was born in 1927 in Winnipeg to English-born parents.

== Filmography ==
=== Films ===
Year	Title	Role	Notes
1967	The Dirty Dozen	Ambulance driver	Uncredited
1967	A Countess from Hong Kong	Reporter #6	
1967	The Man Outside	Spencer	
1970	Performance	The Chauffeur	
1973	A Touch of Class	American	Uncredited
1981	Ragtime	Library Guard	
1985	Bad Medicine	Dr. Beatty	
1989	Batman	Accountant	
2006	Dark Corners	Underpass Tramp	
2009	Terminator Salvation	Robot #6533	

=== Television ===
Year	Title	Role	Notes
1959	Brand	Villager	1 episode
1961	Danger Man	Pilot	1 episode
1969	The Troubleshooters	Andy Kershaw	1 episode
1969	Softly, Softly	Patrick	1 episode
1971	Brett	Protester	1 episode
1973	The Rivals of Sherlock Holmes	Shipping clerk	1 episode
1973	Murder Must Advertise	Mr. Copley	1 episode
1975	Madame Bovary	Lieuvain	1 episode
1977	Crown Court	Insp. Fielding	1 episode
1979	Julius Caesar	Marullus	TV movie
1980	Hamlet, Prince of Denmark	Cornelius	TV movie
1982	Whoops Apocalypse	Chaplain	1 episode
1982	Stalky & Co.	Mr. Prout	4 episode
1985	Reunion at Fairborough	Retired Airman	TV movie
1986	The Last Days of Patton	Tom Reilly	TV movie
1987	The Return of Sherlock Holmes		TV movie
1986	Murrow	board member No. 1	TV movie
1992	To Be the Best	Farmer	TV movie
1996	On Dangerous Ground	Gen. Stilwell	TV movie
1996	Broken Glass	Dr. Sherman	TV movie
2001	Happiness	Katie's Dad	1 episode
2001	Combat Sheep		TV movie
