= Sally Bazely =

British television actress (born 1932)

Sarah Mariette Bazley Green (born 18 November 1932) is a British television actress.

Her main roles were in Father, Dear Father (1968–1970) and Harriet's Back in Town (1972). She also played the '2nd Peasant Blouse', in You Can't Escape (1957); Jenny in a 1962 episode of The Saint (series 1 episode 3); Norman Wisdom's wife in the comedy film What's Good for the Goose (1969); and portrayed Poppaea in the 1976 BBC TV series I, Claudius.
