= Jo's Boys (1959 TV series) =

1959 British TV series

Jo's Boys is a British television mini-series which aired in 1959 on the BBC. It was based on the novels Little Men (1871) and Jo's Boys (1886) by Louisa May Alcott, and consisted of seven episodes. Cast included Annabelle Lee, Michael Caridia, Kenneth Collins, Lily Kann, Richard Palmer, George Pravda, Jimmy Ray, William Simons, and Donald Wilson. Unlike many BBC series of the 1950s, the episodes still exist, though it has yet to be given a DVD release.
