= John Cater =

English actor (1932–2009)

- Born: John Edward Cater; 17 January 1932; Hendon, London, England
- Died: 21 March 2009 (aged 77); London, England
- Occupation: Actor
- Years active: 1958–2008
- Spouse: Wendy Gifford (m. 1963)
- Children: 2

John Edward Cater (17 January 1932 – 21 March 2009) was an English actor.

== Early life ==
John Edward Cater was born 17 January 1932 in Hendon, north London. His mother was a performer and a violinist who performed with the famous music hall troupe, The Pierinos. His father, like his grandfather, was a florist in Hendon. They came from a long line of gardeners who worked at Ickworth Park in Suffolk.

Cater was just four years old when he enrolled in dance school. This early training formed the foundation for a lifetime of physical performance. Cater went on to train at RADA alongside Joe Orton, Joan Collins, Peter O’Toole and Albert Finney.

Cater made his professional acting debut with the Dundee Repertory Theatre after graduating from RADA. He was hired by his friend, the actor Herbert Wise. For the next several years, Cater acted in repertory theatre and summer stock in Aberdeen, Cork, Edinburgh, Guildford, and Nottingham. In 1961, he joined Peter Hall's newly-formed Royal Shakespeare Company first London RSC at the Aldwych Theatre. He made his debut with the RSC (and on the West End) in The Duchess of Malfi.

It was there that he met, and later married, fellow RSC actor Wendy Gifford. Wendy, born in County Durham as Wendy Thompson, took her mother’s Irish family name of Gifford as her stage name. Wendy Gifford was nominated for Best Stage Actress for her portrayal of Linda Loman in Death of a Salesman.

John and Wendy have two daughters. Their eldest daughter is the actress Emma Cater, married to RSC and film/ tv actor Simon Thorp. Their daughter is the actress and writer Tilly Thorp. John’s youngest daughter Harriet was also an actress and singer with the pop band Mamarazzi.

Cater’s television credits include: Danger Man; Z-Cars; The Avengers; The Baron; Doctor Who; Follyfoot; Softly, Softly; Department S; Up Pompeii!; Dad's Army; The Naked Civil Servant; I, Claudius; Alcock and Gander; The Duchess of Duke Street; Thriller (1975), The Sweeney; Inspector Morse; Bergerac; One Foot in the Grave; Lovejoy; Jeeves and Wooster; Midsomer Murders and Doctors.

His film appearances include: The Abominable Dr. Phibes, Dr. Phibes Rises Again and Captain Kronos – Vampire Hunter.

== Death ==
Late in life, Cater's haemochromatosis led to severe arthritis, which significantly inhibited his acting career.

John Cater died of liver cancer on 21 March 2009. He was survived by his wife, Wendy, and his daughters Emma and Harriet.

== Filmography ==
=== Film ===
| Year | Title | Role | Notes |
|---|---|---|---|
| 1966 | Alfie | Siddie's Husband | Uncredited |
| 1968 | Decline and Fall... of a Birdwatcher | Blackall | |
| 1970 | Loot | Meadows | |
| 1971 | The Abominable Dr. Phibes | Superintendent Waverley | |
| 1972 | Dr. Phibes Rises Again | Superintendent Waverley | |
| 1974 | Captain Kronos – Vampire Hunter | Grost | |
| 1978 | News from Nowhere | Richard Grosvenor | |
| 1980 | Rising Damp | Bert | |
| 1980 | Little Lord Fauntleroy | Thomas | |
| 1995 | Savage Hearts | Bernie | |
| 2002 | Fogbound | Older man | |
| 2005 | The Trial of the King Killers | Mr. Beaver | |
| 2005 | Room 36 | Bert | |
| 2006 | Alien Autopsy | Maurice | |

=== Television ===
| Year | Title | Role | Notes | |
|---|---|---|---|---|
| 1966 | Doctor Who | Professor Krimpton | Serial: "The War Machines" | |
| 1966 | Take a Pair of Private Eyes | Lyall Sankey | 2 episodes | |
| 1967 | The Avengers | Olliphant | Episode: "The Living Dead" | |
| 1970 | Dad's Army | George Clarke | Episode: "The Two and a Half Feathers" | |
| 1972 | Alcock and Gander | Ernest | 6 episodes | |
| 1973 | Seven of One | Horace | Episode: "Spanner's Eleven" | |
| 1976-1977 | The Duchess of Duke Street | Joseph Starr | 24 episodes | |
| 1975 | Thriller | Murchison | Episode: "If it's a Man, Hang Up". | |
| 1975 | The Secret Agent | The Professor | TV movie | |
| 1975 | Madame Bovary | Lheureux | 3 episodes | |
| 1975 | The Naked Civil Servant | Psychiatrist | TV movie | |
| 1976 | Nobody's House | Mr Jacobs | Episode: "There's Nobody There" | |
| 1976 | I, Claudius | Tiberius Claudius Narcissus | 3 episodes | |
| 1978 | The Sweeney | Alec Slemen | Episode: "Money, Money, Money" | |
| 1978-1981 | Rosie | Merv | 5 episodes | |
| 1979 | Leave it to Charlie | Bert | Episode: "Moonlight Becomes You" | |
| 1979 | The Glums | Burglar | 1 episode | |
| 1980-1981 | The Other 'Arf | George Watts | 14 episodes | |
| 1982 | Anyone for Denis? | Maurice Picarda | TV movie | |
| 1983 | Jack of Diamonds | Foxwell | 5 episodes | |
| 1987 | Theatre Night | Uncle Titus Dudgeon | Episode: "The Devil's Disciple" | |
| 1987 | Still Crazy Like a Fox | Rockhill | TV movie | |
| 1987 | Home to Roost | Shady Grey, a Homeless Man | TV movie | Series 3, Episode 6 - 1 episode |
| 1989 | The Woman in Black | Arnold Pepperell | TV movie | |
| 1991 | Prisoner of Honor | New War Minister | TV movie | |
| 1993 | Full Stretch | Doorman | Episode: "Ivory Tower" | |
| 1993 | Maigret | Porter | Episode: "Maigret on the Defensive" | |
| 1998 | Goodnight Mister Tom | Dr. Little | TV movie | |
| 2004 | Chucklevision | Maurice | | |
| 2005 | Bad Girls | Solicitor | 1 episode | |
