= Father, Dear Father =

British TV sitcom (1968–1973)

- Genre: Sitcom
- Written by: Johnnie Mortimer and Brian Cooke.
- Directed by: William G. Stewart
- Starring: Patrick Cargill; Natasha Pyne; Ann Holloway; Noel Dyson; Sally Bazely; Dawn Addams
- Theme music composer: Gordon Franks
- Country of origin: United Kingdom
- Original language: English
- No. of series: 7
- No. of episodes: 45

Production
- Producer: William G. Stewart
- Running time: 30 minutes
- Production company: Thames Television

Original release
- Network: ITV
- Release: 5 November 1968 – 6 February 1973

Father, Dear Father is a British television sitcom produced by Thames Television for ITV from 1968 to 1973 starring Patrick Cargill. It was subsequently made into a spin-off film of the same title released in 1973.

An Australian sequel series of the same name (though usually referred to as Father, Dear Father in Australia to distinguish it from the UK original) followed in 1978. The same year a West German adaptation Oh, This Father starring Willy Millowitsch began, lasting until 1981.

== Premise ==
The original series focused on divorced British novelist Patrick Glover (Patrick Cargill) and his daughters, Karen (Ann Holloway) and Anna (Natasha Pyne), a couple of lively girls in their teens. The family lives in Hampstead, London. Another member of the household is the girls' Nanny (Noel Dyson). As well as having to deal with his progeny, Patrick also faces frequent hassles with his ex-wife Barbara (Ursula Howells) and her current husband Bill Mossman (played by Patrick Holt, and later Tony Britton). There is also his brother Philip (Donald Sinden), his mother (Joyce Carey), his agent Georgie Thompson (Sally Bazely Series 1 and 2 and later Dawn Addams Series 4-7), his publisher Ian Smyth (Michael Segal in series 3) and his pet St. Bernard dog 'H. G. Wells'. At the end of the sixth series Anna marries Tim Tanner (Jeremy Child), who then became a regular in the last series.

== Cast ==
- Patrick Cargill - Patrick Glover
- Natasha Pyne - Anna Glover
- Ann Holloway - Karen Glover
- Noel Dyson - Nanny
- Dawn Addams - Georgie Thompson
- Ursula Howells - Barbara
- Joyce Carey - Patrick’s mother
- Sally Bazely - Georgie Thompson
- Jeremy Child - Timothy Tanner
- Tony Britton - Bill Mossman
- Michael Segal - Ian Smythe
- Patrick Holt - Bill Mossman
- James Appleby - Milkman
- Donald Sinden - Philip Glover

== Episodes ==
Series 1 and 2 are in black & white. Series 3 to 7 are in colour.

=== Series 1 (1968) ===
No. overall	No. in series	Title	Original release date
1	1	"The Proposal"	5 November 1968
2	2	"Pussies Galore"	12 November 1968
3	3	"The Return of the Mummy"	19 November 1968
4	4	"Publish and Be Damned"	26 November 1968
5	5	"It Won't Be a Stylish Marriage"	3 December 1968
6	6	"I Should Have Danced All Night"	10 December 1968
7	7	"Lost Weekend"	17 December 1968

=== Series 2 (1969) ===
No. overall	No. in series	Title	Original release date
8	1	"Unhappy Birthday"	27 May 1969
9	2	"We Can't Afford a Carriage"	3 June 1969
10	3	"Show Me the Way to Go Home"	10 June 1969
11	4	"Thinner Than Water"	17 June 1969
12	5	"Baby, Won't You Please Come Home"	24 June 1969
13	6	"Divorce English Style"	1 July 1969

=== Series 3 (1970) ===
No. overall	No. in series	Title	Original release date
14	1	"This Is Your Wife"	12 May 1970
15	2	"One Dog and His Man"	19 May 1970
16	3	"It's Never Too Late"	26 May 1970
17	4	"Nobody's Indispensable"	2 June 1970
18	5	"The Suitable Suitor"	9 June 1970
19	6	"A Man About the House"	16 June 1970

=== Series 4 (1971) ===
No. overall	No. in series	Title	Original release date
20	1	"Last Of The Red-Hot Mommas"	15 June 1971
21	2	"An Affair To Forget"	22 June 1971
22	3	"Housey-Housey"	29 June 1971
23	4	"The Reluctant Runaway"	6 July 1971
24	5	"Come Back Little Sheba"	13 July 1971
25	6	"A Domestic Comedy"	20 July 1971
26	7	"The Naked Truth"	27 July 1971

=== Series 5 (1971) ===
No. overall	No. in series	Title	Original release date
27	1	"Proposed and Seconded"	13 September 1971
28	2	"The Life of the Party"	20 September 1971
29	3	"Nothing But the Tooth"	27 September 1971
30	4	"An Explosive Situation"	4 October 1971
31	5	"A Book for the Bishop"	11 October 1971
32	6	"A Case for Inspector Glover"	18 October 1971

=== Series 6 (1972) ===
No. overall	No. in series	Title	Original release date
33	1	"The Cardboard Casanova"	13 June 1972
34	2	"Brother, Dear Brother"	20 June 1972
35	3	"The Opposite Six"	27 June 1972
36	4	"Unaccustomed As I Am"	4 July 1972
37	5	"Feud, Glorious Feud"	11 July 1972
38	6	"The Engagement"	18 July 1972
39	7	"Father of the Bride"	25 July 1972

=== Series 7 (1973) ===
No. overall	No. in series	Title	Original release date
40	1	"Flat Spin"	2 January 1973
41	2	"Home And Away"	9 January 1973
42	3	"It's In The Book"	16 January 1973
43	4	"The Right Hand Man"	23 January 1973
44	5	"Pop Around The Clock"	30 January 1973
45	6	"In All Directions"	6 February 1973

== Australian version ==
Father, Dear Father
- Country of origin: Australia
- Original language: English
- No. of episodes: 14

Production
- Running time: 30 mins

Original release
- Network: ATN Channel 7
- Release: 2 April 1978 – 28 June 1980

A few years after Karen and Anna have married and left home, Patrick decides to go to Australia to do some research for a book he is writing and takes Nanny along (both Cargill and Dyson reprised the roles). He intends to stay with his brother Jeffrey (Ron Frazer), but Jeffrey unexpectedly has to travel to London for 6 months in connection with his work. Jeffrey comments that he is worried about leaving his daughters, Liz (Sally Conabere) and Sue (Sigrid Thornton), to fend for themselves while he is away and asks if Patrick and Nanny can look after them, and Patrick begrudgingly agrees. Liz and Sue had been looking forward to being free of adult supervision while their father was away, so they're initially unimpressed with the idea. 'H.G.Wells' was replaced by two new St.Bernards, a dog named G.K. (after G.K. Chesterton) and a bitch named 'A.C.' (after Agatha Christie). Wallas Eaton appears in two episodes of the second series as Patrick's Australian publisher, Sam Winterton.

Two 7-episode series were made by Lyle McCabe Productions in association with the Seven Network; like the original, they were produced and directed by William G. Stewart. Gordon Franks' original title music was also re-used. Johnnie Mortimer and Brian Cooke wrote the first episode, "Once More With Feeling"; the rest of the episodes were written by writers such as Richard Waring and Donald Churchill.

=== Series 1 (1978) ===
No. overall	No. in series	Title	Original release date
1	1	"Once More with Feeling"	25 June 1978
2	2	"A Home from Home"	2 July 1978
3	3	"The Floating Housekeeper"	9 July 1978
4	4	"Novel Exercise"	16 July 1978
5	5	"A Word of Appreciation"	23 July 1978
6	6	"Finding Your Feet"	30 July 1978
7	7	"The Lost Sheep"	6 August 1978

=== Series 2 (1980) ===
No. overall	No. in series	Title	Original release date
8	1	"A Novel Experience"	17 May 1980
9	2	"Straight form the Horse's Mouth"	24 May 1980
10	3	"Father, Dear Father's Day"	31 May 1980
11	4	"Twinkle, Twinkle, Little Star"	7 June 1980
12	5	"The Wisdom of Patrick"	14 June 1980
13	6	"I Talk to the Trees"	21 June 1980
14	7	"Thruppling Thursday"	28 June 1980

== DVD release ==
All seven series of Father, Dear Father (including the feature film) have been released on DVD by Network, A 7-disc box-set of the complete series has also been released. Both series of the Australian Father, Dear Father series have been released in a 2 disc set by Umbrella Entertainment in Australia.

DVD	Release date
The Complete Series 1	15 January 2007
The Complete Series 2	13 August 2007
The Complete Series 3	22 October 2007
The Complete Series 4	1 September 2008
The Complete Series 5	8 June 2009
The Complete Series 6	23 August 2010
The Complete Series 7 The Complete Series 1 to 7 + Movie Box Set	8 November 2010

== See also ==
- List of films based on British sitcoms
