= List of Steptoe and Son characters =

Steptoe and Son and Son is a British sitcom created by comedy writers Ray Galton and Alan Simpson, originally broadcast over four series between 1962 and 1965, and again for a further three series and two Christmas specials between 1970 and 1974. Two films followed the series; Steptoe and Son and Steptoe and Son Ride Again.

The series revolved around father-and-son duo Albert and Harold Steptoe, Harold son # James James steptoe the titular father and son, and son who live together in their Rag-and-bone family trade mans -rag-and-bone yard with their horse Hercules. The comedy was born from their differing views on their situation; Albert was quite content in the house, whilst Harold was desperate to better himself and get away; these plans though, were often thwarted by Albert, who didn't want his son and son to leave home.

== Main characters ==
=== Albert Steptoe ===
Albert Edward Ladysmith Steptoe (Wilfrid Brambell) was born on 26 September 1899, though he always claimed to have been born in 1901. It is mentioned in "A Perfect Christmas" that he is illegitimate; his father was unknown but believed to have been a local muffin man who died when Albert was 10. The portrait Albert keeps of his father is actually of William Gladstone. However, in the 1965 episode "Those Magnificent Men and Their Heating Machines", Albert states his father died from whelk poisoning shortly after Harold was born. Albert appears to have joined the army underage at the beginning of the First World War and is seen wearing the Mons Star medals to prove it. On one occasion he tells a reporter that he joined the Grenadier Guards, somewhat unlikely given his small stature. He claims that he was hit by a grenade in 1917; when it didn't explode he threw it back to the German trenches with devastating effect, especially on the canteen: sausages and sauerkraut went flying into the air. He apparently served with the British Expeditionary Force to Archangel, White Russia in 1919. Albert is lazy, stubborn, narrow-minded and foul-mouthed with revolting personal habits; he is content with his place in the world, utterly unpretentious and downright cynical. He can be extremely vindictive and does everything he can to prevent his son Harold from improving himself—especially if it means him leaving home. He is normally unshaven and wears a very old pair of discoloured false teeth with some teeth missing. His wife—alternately named Gladys and Emily—died on 23 December 1936. He mentions in one episode that he was one of 14 children. "Steptoe a la Cart" reveals that he has a daughter in France and "Cuckoo in the Nest" suggests that he has a son in Australia; "Oh, What a Beautiful Mourning!" suggests that his niece could instead be his daughter.

=== Harold Steptoe ===
Harold Albert Kitchener Steptoe (Harry H. Corbett) was born in 1925 (Corbett's birth date) in the 1960s series, or around 1930 in the 1970s series. In the episode "Loathe Story" he says he was aged 10 just before the outbreak of the Second World War, which would indicate a birth year in 1928 or 1929, and in the episode "A Star is Born" he claims to be the same age as Sean Connery, (born 25 August 1930). Harold was educated at Scrubs Lane Elementary School, and it was revealed in "The Bird" that his father withdrew him from school when he was just 12 years old. He too is obstinate, though prone to moments of enthusiasm about an idea. Harold unlike Albert, has aspirations. He wants to move up in the world — most of all to escape from the family home and his stifling relationship with his father. This is the subject of the first episode, "The Offer". He likes to see his business as antiques rather than junk. He bitterly regrets leaving the army; his army service took him to Malaya and he achieved the rank of corporal. He nearly always wears a workman's belt adorned with army cap badges. In the 1960s series, however, he had served in the final years of the Second World War, though he had tried to avoid being called up into the Royal Artillery on false medical grounds. He is a dreamer and idealist. Politically, Harold is a Labour Party member who is appalled that his father is a Conservative supporter. He aims to improve his mind and his social circle but always fails, often due to Albert's deliberate put-downs or sabotage. Harold's exasperation and disgust at his father's behaviour often results in his repeating the catchphrase "You dirty old man".

=== Extended Steptoe family ===
- Zita Steptoe (née Smith) (Carolyn Seymour) is briefly the wife of Harold, in only the first film version. She and Harold meet at the local football club, where she is performing as a stripper. After a brief whirlwind romance, she and Harold get married and fly to Spain for their honeymoon, but it is gatecrashed by Albert. After a bout of food poisoning, Albert and Harold fly home, leaving Zita in Spain. Feeling bored and unloved, she leaves Harold for one of the British holiday representatives at the hotel. Some months later, she and Harold reunite, revealing that she is pregnant and she tells him that the child is his. Having broken off her relationship with the holiday rep, Zita moves back in with Harold and Albert, but Albert goes out of his way to make Zita feel uncomfortable and she flees. A short while later a baby, believed to be Harold and Zita's is found on the Steptoe's doorstep, parodying the Nativity. Believing it to be Zita's, Harold and Albert have it baptised and name it after the priest who conducts the christening - who is also called Albert. The baby disappears while under Albert's care. Harold goes searching, and finds Zita stripping at a rugby club, and saves her when she is pushed into a scrum of rugby players. He fails, and is saved by Zita's band musician. The two carry him back to her dressing room where he hears a baby crying behind a curtain. He moves the curtain back to reveal a mixed-raced baby - the son of Zita and her band musician, who is black and now a couple. Harold realises he was not the father of the first baby. Zita and her storyline is not referenced in the television series or the sequel.
- Emily or Gladys Mary Steptoe (née Bonclark) is the mother of Harold and the late wife of Albert. She was born in 1901, married Albert just after the war and died on 23 December 1936, when Harold was only young. Her death meant that while growing up, Harold idolised his mother, almost to a fault. When Albert thought of remarrying, Harold would rant about what a saint Emily had been, and how no other woman would ever fill her boots. Albert, however, would shatter his illusions.
- Victoria Alexandria Steptoe was Albert's mother. Her full name is given in The Perfect Christmas, when Harold finds Albert's birth certificate for his passport application. This episode explicitly states she was a single mother to Albert, and had been fired from her job as a domestic servant after her master found out she was pregnant. This story, however, is in contradiction to Albert's well-established, large family of 14 or so siblings, of which many appear throughout the show's run.
- Auntie Rose Bonclark was Emily Steptoe's sister. While growing up, Rose was looked up to by Harold, but only in minority compared to his mother. In the Series 8 episode Porn Yesterday, Harold acquired a What the Butler Saw machine, in which was a film of a milkman and a housewife in a bath, which Harold realised was Albert, and Albert told him that the woman was his mother's sister, to Harold's dismay. Albert then said that Rose died of pneumonia a fortnight after the film was produced, most likely due to all the milk being poured over her in the film; she and Albert were even listed in the credits. On more than one occasion, when looking for a photograph of his mother, Harold gets his mother and Auntie Rose mixed up.
- Uncle Arthur Steptoe (George A. Cooper) is one of Albert's fourteen brothers and sisters, appearing in the episodes And Afterwards At... and Oh, What a Beautiful Mourning!. In his first appearance, he is in attendance of Harold's ill-fated wedding, arriving with the rest of the Steptoe clan feigning sympathy, but really trying to take back the food mixer he gave Harold for his wedding. He reappears at the funeral of his and Albert's brother, George, having arranged his funeral and the funerals of the other Steptoe siblings, Bob and Freda, mainly to his own profit but he denies it. He has a wife, Deborah, and a son, Jeffrey. He works at a bus depot.
- Auntie May (Rose Hill) and Uncle Herbert (James Bulloch) are Albert's sister and her husband, a bus inspector. The two appear in the Series Four episode And Afterwards At..., coming round to comfort Harold after his aborted wedding to Melanie and to reclaim their gift. They are much better off that the rest of their siblings, and offer Harold the chance to come and stay with them. Auntie Ethel holds it against Auntie May that she moved away from their home, Cairo Road, and left her alone with their mother. Auntie May is much less emotionally upset and sympathetic than the other aunts, proclaiming that she was right when she said it wouldn't last between the two.
- Auntie Ethel (Joan Newell) and Uncle Ted (George Hirste) are Albert's sister and brother-in-law, appearing in And Afterwards At.., as guests at Harold's aborted wedding to Melanie. Auntie Ethel is greatly upset by Melanie's abandonment of her nephew, but visits mainly to reclaim her wedding gift for her daughter, Elsie, who has recently become engaged. Ethel invites Harold to stay with her and Ted, saying that Albert "puts the mockers on anybody". Ethel has a small grudge against her sister, May, who left her alone at the family homestead in Cairo Road with their mother. Joan Newell previously appeared in the episode The Stepmother (1962), playing Albert's fiancée, Emma Marshall.
- Auntie Daphne (Gretchen Franklin) appears in And Afterwards At.., reclaiming her wedding gift to Harold, a set of bed linen.
- Auntie Minnie (Mollie Sugden) appeared in Oh, What a Beautiful Morning! as a sister of Albert. She was a quiet, aloof woman, who confided in Albert that the only thing worth having, as was the consensus with the rest of the family, was a white figurine on George's mantelpiece. She was first to storm out when she found out what George had done to his money, and was never mentioned again. Mollie Sugden previously appeared in And Afterwards At..., not as a relative of the Steptoe family, but as the mother of Harold's fiancée, Melanie. It is hinted at, by Auntie Ada, that she used to let her house out to soldiers from Canada in World War II and that she has looser morals than the rest of the family.
- Uncle Nobby (Tommy Godfrey) is a brother of Albert's, appearing in Oh, What a Beautiful Mourning!. He is the only relative Albert won't hear insulted, believing Nobby is an intellectual, whilst Harold sarcastically describes him as the family's answer to Malcolm Muggeridge. He is married to Alice, but Alice had many affairs, resulting in five children that Nobby believed was his - Albert said that her daughter, Caroline, could well be his. The shock of finding out that none of the five were actually his children, Nobby found solace in whiskey, and remained in a permanent state of semi-inebriation. Albert says he was one of Billy Graham's first coverts at The Albert Hall.
- Auntie Ada (Rita Webb) is a sister of Albert's, appearing in Oh, What a Beautiful Morning!. She is an older, rounder woman with a loud mouth. Her brother, Arthur, tells her to stop swearing at the funeral. Harold is depressed by the fact that he will be lumbered with her, because he thinks she is going insane and dresses like Carmen Miranda despite her advanced age. Albert describes her harmless, but Harold persists in the belief that she is "potty"; Albert put it down to her husband deserting her for a woman in Newcastle upon his return from the Dunkirk evacuation. Webb previously appeared in And Afterwards At..., as Auntie Freda Bonclark, a sister of the late Emily Steptoe and Auntie Rose.
- Jeffrey Steptoe (Simon Cord) is the nasal-sounding son of Arthur, nephew of Albert and cousin of Harold. He appears in Oh, What a Beautiful Mourning!. He runs a stall selling various assorted items on Portobello Road, after previously running a window-cleaning business. He was a godson of his uncle, George Steptoe.
- Caroline Steptoe (Yvonne Antrobus) is a cousin of Harold, and the niece (and potential daughter) of Albert. She appears in Oh, What a Beautiful Mourning!. Caroline's mother, Alice, used to bring Caroline to stay with Albert and Harold at their home when she was young, but by the time of the funeral they had not seen each other for many years. Both instantly attracted to each other, they agree that it is alright for them to get together, as marriage of cousins is legal. After the funeral, Harold agrees to go with her to a party that one of her friends is holding until Albert tells him about her uncertain parentage, implying that any of the Steptoe brothers (including Albert) could be her father.
- Joyce (Queenie Watts) is a relative of the Steptoe family, appearing in Oh, What a Beautiful Mourning!. She gets into an argument with her relative, Jessie, over a vase before the funeral of George Steptoe. She, along with the rest of the family, leave the house in a fit of rage when they are told they haven't been left anything.
- Jessie (Margaret Flint) is a relative of the Steptoe family, appearing in Oh, What a Beautiful Mourning!. She gets into an argument with Joyce over a vase, who tells her she is only family through marriage. She looks after Uncle Nobby at the funeral. Flint previously appeared briefly as a distant Steptoe relative in And Afterwards At..., possibly the same character.
- Ted (Bartlett Mullins) is a relative of the Steptoe family, appearing in Oh, What a Beautiful Mourning!. He nearly takes a hat belonging to Albert, thinking it was one of George's.
- Alice (Gilly Flower) is married to Nobby and mother of five children, whose paternity is uncertain. She appears in the episode Oh, What a Beautiful Mourning!. Her daughter, Caroline, tells Harold that she is ransacking the linen cupboard, and insists she will not visit George's graveside when she finds out she won't get anything. She used to work at a dog racing track.
- Elsie (Stella Moray) is a niece of Albert's, who appeared in Oh, What a Beautiful Mourning!, in charge of distributing the drinks around the family before the funeral. She flirts briefly with Albert.
- George Nightingale Steptoe is the eldest brother of Albert and his siblings, who died in events before the episode Oh, What a Beautiful Mourning!, in which his funeral is held. He died at the age of 93, with a considerable amount of money. He was godfather to his nephews Harold and Jeffrey, and two other unnamed relatives, all four of whom were pallbearers at his funeral. He asked Albert and his wife for a loan of £25 in 1927, to help him with an immigration to Australia, but this never followed through. When he died, knowing how ugly his family could get, he arranged for all his furniture to be taken away and sold during his funeral, leaving his relatives nothing but a glass of champagne each; he sold his belongings, for the sum of £1527, and had the money split equally between the RSPCA and Battersea Dogs Home. His funeral was managed by his brother, Arthur. Despite strict opposition and cursing from his surviving family, Harold was amused, and made a toast to him as "the only Steptoe I ever knew with a sense of humour". His family hurriedly left his house, insulted and offended, saying they wouldn't visit his grave. The only thing worth any value in his house, which was being eyed up by all his relatives, was a white figurine on his mantelpiece, which Albert cunningly stole and hid under his massive bowler hat before he left for the funeral.
- Auntie Celia sent Harold a telegram for his wedding to Melanie in And Afterwards At....
- Bob Steptoe and Freda Steptoe are the already-deceased siblings of Albert, whose funerals were organised by their brother Arthur, who got a tiepin from Bob's funeral. For Freda's, Arthur took a pound from all the family and pocketed the money, giving her some dead flowers from his garden instead.

== Other characters ==
- Reverend Charles Cakebread (Anthony Sharp) is the Steptoe family's local vicar, who comes to visit the Steptoe's at various inopportune moments, occasionally accompanied by his wife (Dorothy Frere). On his last visit, he finds the What the Butler Saw machine containing the film made by Albert and his sister-in-law, Rose. He takes the machine and uses it at his church fayre, using some old films - also starring Albert - that his Boy Scouts found in a demolished shed.
- Frankie Barrow (Henry Woolf) is a local gangster in Shepherd's Bush. He made his first appearance as the main antagonist in Steptoe and Son Ride Again when Harold buys a greyhound off of him, before appearing in the series in the episode The Seven Steptoerai, where he sets up a protection racket for local traders. When the Steptoes can't pay, Barrow and his mob begin vandalising the yard before Albert and his friends fight off the thugs using Kung Fu.
- Charlie Miller (Michael Balfour) is another local gangster in Shepherd's Bush. In The Colour Problem, Harold states he has served ten years in prison, he also describes him as the "biggest villain in West London", and finds it silly that everyone in Shepherd's Bush holds him up as an example. Albert states that he donated an altar cloth to the church, which Harold tells him he stole from a church in Ipswich.

== Other appearances ==
| Name | Episode Name | Character | Year |
|---|---|---|---|
| Michael Ward | The Piano | Patron | 1962 |
| John Laurie | Wallah Wallah Catsmeat | The Vet | 1962 |
| Colin Gordon | The Holiday; Live Now, P.A.Y.E Later | The Doctor; Mr Greenwood | 1962; 1970 |
| Yootha Joyce | The Bath; A Box in Town; Steptoe and Son Ride Again (film) | Delilah; Avis; Freda (Lenny's wife) | 1963; 1965; 1973 |
| Leonard Rossiter | The Lead Man Cometh; The Desperate Hours | Lead Man; Johnny | 1963; 1972 |
| June Whitfield | The Bond That Binds Us | Madge | 1964 |
| Damaris Hayman | Sunday for Seven Days; My Old Man's a Tory | Cinema Cashier; Karen Frobisher | 1964; 1965 |
| Gwendolyn Watts | Steptoe a la Cart | Monique | 1964 |
| Jean Kent | Two's Company | Daphne Goodlace | 1970 |
| Kenneth J. Warren | Cuckoo in The Nest | Arthur | 1970 |
| Geoffrey Chater | Tea For Two | Peregrine | 1970 |
| Richard Hurndall | Any Old Iron | Timothy Stanhope | 1970 |
| J. G. Devlin | The Desperate Hours | Frank | 1972 |
| Raymond Huntley | Loathe Story | Psychiatrist | 1972 |
| Joanna Lumley | Loathe Story | Bunty | 1972 |
| Trevor Bannister | A Star is Born | Rupert Ffaines-Muir | 1972 |
| Margaret Nolan | A Star is Born | Nemone Wagstaff | 1972 |
| Angus MacKay | And So To Bed | Salesman | 1974 |
| Lynn Farleigh | And So To Bed | Marcia | 1974 |
| Patricia Routledge | Seance in a Wet Rag and Bone Yard | Madame Fontana | 1974 |
