= Albert Steptoe =

- Steptoe and Son character
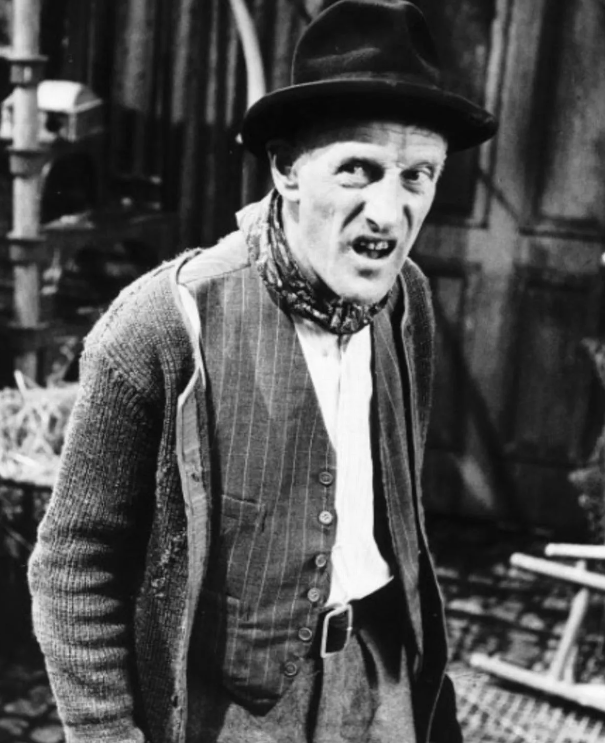
- Wilfrid Brambell as Albert Steptoe
- First appearance: The Offer
- Last appearance: A Perfect Christmas
- Created by: Galton and Simpson
- Portrayed by: Wilfrid Brambell

In-universe information
- Occupation: Rag-and-bone man
- Spouse: Gladys Steptoe
- Relatives: Harold Steptoe (son)

Albert Edward Ladysmith Steptoe is a fictional character from the British sitcom Steptoe and Son, portrayed by Wilfrid Brambell. He was the basis for the character of Fred Sanford from Sanford and Son, the American adaption of Steptoe and Son.

== Character ==
=== History ===
Steptoe and Son had very little continuity with regard to Albert's past. His birthday has been 25 January (Sixty Five Today), 10 February (Steptoe and Son Ride Again) and 26 September (A Perfect Christmas). His birth year also changed as the series went on - varying from 1898 to 1902. He was born at the home in Oil Drum Lane where he and Harold reside throughout the series, and was possibly the tenth of fourteen children. His father had started "Steptoe and Son", meaning that Albert was actually the "Son". Albert mentions that his father died just after Harold was born, from whelk poisoning. Albert left school at 8 years old.

However, a storyline introduced in the final episode insists that Albert was born illegitimate in 1899, to Victoria Alexandria Steptoe, a domestic servant, and his father was suspected to be the local muffin man who died when Albert was 10. The portrait Albert keeps of his father is actually William Gladstone.

Albert appears to have joined the army underage at the beginning of the First World War and is seen wearing the Mons Star medals to prove it. On one occasion he tells a reporter that he joined the Grenadier Guards, somewhat unlikely given his small stature. He claims that he was hit by a grenade in 1917; when it didn't explode, he threw it back to the German trenches with devastating effect, especially on the canteen: sausages and sauerkraut went flying into the air. He apparently served with the British Expeditionary Force to Archangel, White Russia in 1919. The episode Pilgrim's Progress sees Albert and Harold attempt to fly to France to visit Albert's old battlegrounds.

Shortly after the war, he married his wife Gladys Mary Bonclark (referred to as Emily in Seance in a Wet Rag and Bone Yard) and they had a son, Harold. His wife died on 23 December 1936 and Albert brought up Harold by himself. Whenever he considered remarrying, Harold would rant about what a saint she'd been, and how no other woman would ever fill her boots. Albert, however, would shatter his illusions.

Presumably sometime after his wife died, he took part in a porn film with his sister-in-law Rose, in which they played the parts of a milkman and a housewife. Rose died of pneumonia a fortnight after the film was produced; most likely due to the milk poured over her. According to Harold, during the Second World War, he apparently had a moustache, compared to that of Hitler's. This is seen in flashbacks to the 1930s of a younger Albert in Loathe Story.

Albert's final appearance (alongside Harold) is in a 1981 UK advert for Kenco Coffee. Steptoe and Son in Murder at Oil Drum Lane provides closure to the show, establishing that Harold accidentally killed his father while he was on the toilet.

=== Personality ===
Albert is lazy, stubborn, narrow-minded and foul-mouthed with revolting personal habits, he is normally unshaven and wears a very old pair of discoloured false teeth with some teeth missing. He is a heavy smoker, beginning at 8 years old.

Unlike his son, Harold, Albert is content with his place in the world and is utterly unpretentious and downright cynical. In the first film, when discussing with Harold his grandson's future, he states he does not approve of inherited wealth. His staunch support for the Conservative Party deeply angers Labour supporting Harold, who accuses Albert of being a "traitor to the working-class".

He can be extremely vindictive and does everything he can to prevent Harold from improving himself - especially if it means him leaving home. He often feigns heart attacks in order to keep his son around, but despite their disagreements and bitterness, the two maintain an essential connection and family loyalty to one another. This is shown in several episodes, such as Full House in which Albert wins back Harold's money in a game of cards against Harold's manipulative group of friends, and The Seven Steptoerai when they are menaced by a local gangster running a protection racket and team up with some of Albert's friends to fight off the gangster's thugs.

== Reception ==
The character of Albert Steptoe was well received throughout Britain. His unkempt and grubby nature was a hit with viewers – his son Harold's catchphrase about his hygiene "You dirty old man!" became synonymous with the character of Albert and is part of British culture. In a 2001 poll conducted by Channel 4, Albert was ranked 39th on their list of the 100 Greatest TV Characters. Another Channel 4 poll to find Britain's best loved sitcoms placed Steptoe and Son at 19th. At the show's peak, it brought in over 20 million viewers; the series 3 episode The Lodger is one of the most watched television broadcasts in the UK – and the most watched UK television broadcast for 1964.

Steptoe and Son was the inspiration for the American sitcom Sanford and Son. Many of the shows earlier episodes were adapted from Steptoe and Son and made to fit American audiences. Redd Foxx's Fred G. Sanford was heavily inspired by Albert – the gag of Sanford's fake heart attacks also came from Albert who would feign a heart attack even at the thought of his son Harold gaining any independence. Only Fools and Horses character Grandad was also inspired by Steptoe, encompassing some of his dirty habits.
