= List of Steptoe and Son episodes =

Episode list

This is an episode list of the British sitcom Steptoe and Son. All episodes were originally shown on what is now known as BBC One, although the station was simply called BBC Television until April 1964 when BBC2 began broadcasting (between the third and fourth series). Dates shown are the original broadcast dates. Series 1–4 were produced in black and white, and series 5–8 in colour. However, the series 5 episodes, and all but two of series 6, only survive in black and white.

Series 1–6 were produced and directed by Duncan Wood, series 7 by John Howard Davies (apart from "Divided We Stand" which was directed by David Croft as Davies was ill), the 1973 Christmas Special by Graeme Muir, and series 8 and 1974 Christmas Special by Douglas Argent (with "The Seven Steptoerai" being co-directed by Mike Crisp). All episodes were written by Ray Galton and Alan Simpson. As of 2023 the entire run (including the pilot episode that was shown as part of the "Comedy Playhouse" series) has been broadcast and repeated on the "That's TV" channel - although the Electronic Programme Guide (EPG) frequently mislabels episodes.

== Series overview ==
Series	Episodes	Originally released	
Series	Episodes	First released	Last released
1	6	5 January 1962	12 July 1962
2	7	3 January 1963	14 February 1963
3	7	7 January 1964	18 February 1964
4	7	4 October 1965	15 November 1965
5	7	6 March 1970	17 April 1970
6	8	2 November 1970	21 December 1970
7	7	21 February 1972	3 April 1972
Special		24 December 1973	
8	6	4 September 1974	10 October 1974
Special		26 December 1974	

== Episodes ==
=== Series 1 (1962) ===
No. overall	No. in series	Title	Directed by	Written by	Original release date
1	1	"The Offer"	Duncan Wood	Alan Simpson, Ray Galton	5 January 1962 (Note: as part of Comedy Playhouse); Repeat: 7 June 1962
Harold's been offered a job elsewhere, so when he discovers Albert has been drinking out of the cocktail cabinet, he begins to pack up his belongings and leave his dad for good. However when Albert refuses to allow Harold to use the horse to move the cart full of his belongings, Harold breaks down and the two go inside for a cup of tea. Now considered to be the first Steptoe episode, it was originally a one-off episode in the "Comedy Playhouse" series.
2	2	"The Bird"	Duncan Wood	Alan Simpson, Ray Galton	14 June 1962
Harold is going out every night, so Albert suspects that he must be seeing a girl. Determined to put a stop to the romance, he gets Harold to invite the girl back to the house for dinner. Meanwhile, Albert puts the clocks forward so when she fails to show up at the right time, Harold thinks she has stood him up.
3	3	"The Piano"	Duncan Wood	Alan Simpson, Ray Galton	21 June 1962
Harold is offered a piano for free, providing he moves it himself. He gets Albert to help, only to find out that it is on the top floor of a block of flats. The twelfth of sixteen stories adapted into an episode of the U.S remake Sanford and Son renamed "The Piano Movers".
4	4	"The Economist"	Duncan Wood	Alan Simpson, Ray Galton	28 June 1962
Harold tries to teach Albert about the economics of running a business. Using his new-found knowledge of bulk buying, he then ends up buying 4,000 pairs of false teeth for £40, hoping to make a killing. Harold puts an advert in The Times, but when they don't sell, he takes their last £10 and tries again, this time bringing home 400 World War II gas masks. Featuring Frank Thornton.
5	5	"The Diploma"	Duncan Wood	Alan Simpson, Ray Galton	5 July 1962
Harold decides to get out of the rag and bone trade, and get a diploma in TV repair, only for Albert to prove that he knows more about it than Harold does.
6	6	"The Holiday"	Duncan Wood	Alan Simpson, Ray Galton	12 July 1962
For the first time ever, Harold plans to go on holiday abroad by himself instead of going to Bognor Regis with his dad. Albert fakes a heart attack to stop him from going, and the doctor advises Harold to take him to Bognor. Featuring Colin Gordon.

=== Series 2 (1963) ===
No. overall	No. in series	Title	Directed by	Written by	Original release date	Recorded
7	1	"Wallah-Wallah Catsmeat"	Duncan Wood	Alan Simpson, Ray Galton	3 January 1963	20 December 1962
Hercules, the Steptoes's horse, is sick so the local rag and bone men pitch in to help. Features John Laurie and Leslie Dwyer
8	2	"The Bath"	Duncan Wood	Alan Simpson, Ray Galton	10 January 1963	13 December 1962
Albert decides to have a bath while Harold's latest companion is due to come round for pre-bingo cocktails. Features Yootha Joyce.
9	3	"The Stepmother"	Duncan Wood	Alan Simpson, Ray Galton	17 January 1963	3 January 1963
Albert plans to re-marry, but Harold will do everything in his power to prevent it. Exists as a Shibaden VT recording. The 10th of 16 stories adapted into an episode of Sanford and Son renamed "The Barracuda".
10	4	"Sixty-Five Today"	Duncan Wood	Alan Simpson, Ray Galton	24 January 1963	10 January 1963
Albert's 65th birthday comes as a joke to Harold, who pretends to forget in order to wind him up. Featuring Frank Thornton. The 2nd of 16 stories adapted into an episode of Sanford and Son renamed "Happy Birthday, Pop".
11	5	"A Musical Evening"	Duncan Wood	Alan Simpson, Ray Galton	31 January 1963	17 January 1963
Harold has picked up some old gramophone records, which he's keen to add to his classical music collection.
12	6	"Full House"	Duncan Wood	Alan Simpson, Ray Galton	7 February 1963	24 January 1963
Harold plans an evening of cards with a group of friends. The 13th of 16 stories adapted into an episode of Sanford and Son renamed "The Card Sharps".
13	7	"Is That Your Horse Outside?"	Duncan Wood	Alan Simpson, Ray Galton	14 February 1963	4 February 1963
Harold falls for a rich married woman (Patricia Haines) and thinks it's love.

=== Series 3 (1964) ===
Series 3 would see the highest recorded audience viewing figures, with the episode The Lodger being watched by 21.54 million.

No. overall	No. in series	Title	Directed by	Written by	Original release date	Recorded
14	1	"Homes Fit for Heroes"	Duncan Wood	Alan Simpson, Ray Galton	7 January 1964	12 December 1963
Harold plans to go on a sailing trip around the world, and bung Albert in an old peoples home. The 15th of 16 stories adapted into an episode of Sanford and Son renamed "Home Sweet Home for the Aged".
15	2	"The Wooden Overcoats"	Duncan Wood	Alan Simpson, Ray Galton	14 January 1964	19 December 1963
Harold comes home with a cartful of coffins, much to Albert's horror. Exists as a Shibaden VT recording. The 9th of 16 stories adapted into an episode of Sanford and Son renamed "Coffins for Sale".
16	3	"The Lead Man Cometh"	Duncan Wood	Alan Simpson, Ray Galton	21 January 1964	2 January 1964
The business is doing badly and the Steptoes are having to break into their savings to keep their heads above water, and then a dealer in lead comes round and sells them tons of lead at a cheap price, they then find out the lead was stolen when the police visit the yard. Featuring Leonard Rossiter. The 4th of 16 stories adapted into an episode of Sanford and Son renamed "The Copper Caper"
17	4	"Steptoe à la Cart"	Duncan Wood	Alan Simpson, Ray Galton	28 January 1964	9 January 1964
Harold meets a French girl, and falls for her. When she meets Albert they talk about her family history and it becomes apparent that Albert may have dated her grandmother while on leave during the first war with all its ramifications. Featuring Frank Thornton and Gwendolyn Watts.
18	5	"Sunday for Seven Days"	Duncan Wood	Alan Simpson, Ray Galton	4 February 1964	16 January 1964
Albert and Harold are getting ready for an evening at the pictures.
19	6	"The Bonds That Bind Us"	Duncan Wood	Alan Simpson, Ray Galton	11 February 1964	23 January 1964
Albert has a windfall on the Premium Bonds. Featuring June Whitfield.
20	7	"The Lodger"	Duncan Wood	Alan Simpson, Ray Galton	18 February 1964	30 January 1964
Albert decides to get in a lodger to earn some money, but Harold announces that when the lodger steps in, he steps out, then Albert catches Harold taking the advert out the shop window, tells him and Harold walks out, but Albert can't get a lodger anyway. Exists as a Shibaden VT recording.

=== Series 4 (1965) ===
The first series where the creator's names came before the actor's name in the opening titles but still saying "By Alan Simpson and Ray Galton"

No. overall	No. in series	Title	Directed by	Written by	Original release date	Recorded
21	1	"And Afterwards At..."	Duncan Wood	Alan Simpson, Ray Galton	4 October 1965	12 September 1965
Harold's getting married, but what will the bride say? The 3rd of 16 stories adapted into an episode of Sanford and Son renamed "Here Comes the Bride, There Goes the Bride".
22	2	"Crossed Swords"	Duncan Wood	Alan Simpson, Ray Galton	11 October 1965	19 September 1965
The Steptoes take a porcelain vase to a West End antiques expert's shop. Featuring Derek Nimmo. The first of 16 stories adapted into the pilot episode of Sanford and Son with the same title.
23	3	"Those Magnificent Men and Their Heating Machines"	Duncan Wood	Alan Simpson, Ray Galton	18 October 1965	26 September 1965
Harold installs central heating in the house, but Albert's views of his bad workmanship turn out to be right as he pulls the house down.
24	4	"The Siege of Steptoe Street"	Duncan Wood	Alan Simpson, Ray Galton	25 October 1965	3 October 1965
The Steptoes have to defend their home from businessmen with court orders after they run up one too many bills. The 8th of 16 stories adapted into an episode of Sanford and Son renamed "The Great Sanford Siege".
25	5	"A Box in Town"	Duncan Wood	Alan Simpson, Ray Galton	1 November 1965	10 October 1965
Harold moves into an attic bed-sit flat. Features Yootha Joyce. The 7th of 16 stories adapted into an episode of Sanford and Son called "A Pad for Lamont".
26	6	"My Old Man's a Tory"	Duncan Wood	Alan Simpson, Ray Galton	8 November 1965	17 October 1965
Harold and Albert clash over their opposing political views. Exists as a Shibaden VT recording.
27	7	"Pilgrim's Progress"	Duncan Wood	Alan Simpson, Ray Galton	15 November 1965	24 October 1965
Albert asks Harold for him to take him back to the Great War battlefield to think of the memories of the war, but whilst on the plane, he upsets and insults the fighting legion of the French and the American, then gets into a fight with them. Featuring Frank Thornton.

=== Series 5 (1970) ===
Produced in colour, but all currently exist only in black and white. Now with the "By Ray Galton and Alan Simpson" byline at the beginning.

No. overall	No. in series	Title	Directed by	Written by	Original release date	Recorded
28	1	"A Death in the Family"	Duncan Wood	Ray Galton and Alan Simpson	6 March 1970	15 February 1970
Hercules the Horse succumbs to a heart attack aged 39.
29	2	"A Winter's Tale"	Duncan Wood	Ray Galton and Alan Simpson	13 March 1970	22 February 1970
Albert and Harold once again clash over the destination for their annual holiday. First reel of a b/w telerecording recovered in 2008. A colour version has been at least partially made, although a full recovery remains unreleased.
30	3	"Any Old Iron?"	Duncan Wood	Ray Galton and Alan Simpson	20 March 1970	8 March 1970
Harold makes a new friend out of sophisticated antique dealer Timothy Stanhope (Richard Hurndall). However, Albert suspects that Timothy's interest in Harold is something other than friendship.
31	4	"Steptoe and Son – and Son!"	Duncan Wood	Ray Galton and Alan Simpson	27 March 1970	15 March 1970
Harold is believed to be the father of an illegitimate son. Features Ann Beach and Glynn Edwards.
32	5	"The Colour Problem"	Duncan Wood	Ray Galton and Alan Simpson	3 April 1970	22 March 1970
Albert wants a colour television set... The 11th of 16 stories adapted into an episode of Sanford and Son renamed "TV or Not TV".
33	6	"T.B. or Not T.B.?"	Duncan Wood	Ray Galton and Alan Simpson	10 April 1970	5 April 1970
Albert is wrongly thought to have tuberculosis. The 5th of 16 stories adapted into an episode of Sanford and Son renamed "A Matter of Life and Breath".
34	7	"Men of Property"	Duncan Wood	Ray Galton and Alan Simpson	17 April 1970	29 March 1970
Harold and Albert find out that they don't actually own their house. They have to borrow £750 to buy the property. They hatch a scheme to schmooze the local bank manager for the loan.

=== Series 6 (1970) ===
Second series produced in colour. With two episodes excepted (indicated), this series now exists only in black and white.

No. overall	No. in series	Title	Directed by	Written by	Original release date	Recorded
35	1	"Robbery with Violence"	Duncan Wood	Ray Galton and Alan Simpson	2 November 1970	18 October 1970
After accidentally knocking over Harold's porcelain collection, Albert pretends they have been robbed to cover it up. The 6th of 16 stories adapted into an episode of Sanford and Son renamed "We Were Robbed".
36	2	"Come Dancing"	Duncan Wood	Ray Galton and Alan Simpson	9 November 1970	25 October 1970
Harold has a lady friend who enjoys dancing, but Harold himself cannot dance, so Albert teaches Harold the steps that he needs. Survives in colour.
37	3	"Two's Company"	Duncan Wood	Ray Galton and Alan Simpson	16 November 1970	1 November 1970
Albert reveals to Harold that he has asked a woman (Jean Kent) to marry him. When Albert brings her to the house, Harold realises that the very same woman was an old flame of his. The 14th of 16 stories adapted into an episode of Sanford and Son renamed "The Infernal Triangle"
38	4	"Tea for Two"	Duncan Wood	Ray Galton and Alan Simpson	23 November 1970	8 November 1970
Harold and Albert's support for rival parties in the Shepherd's Bush by-election has drawn battle lines between them.
39	5	"Without Prejudice"	Duncan Wood	Ray Galton and Alan Simpson	30 November 1970	15 November 1970
Harold is desperate to move from Oil Drum Lane after a noisy new motorway flyover causes irritation. However, the residents of the street to which the Steptoes plan on moving, object to the possible lowering of standards of the residents, not to mention the lowering of property prices. Featuring Gerald Flood and Norman Bird.
40	6	"Pot Black"	Duncan Wood	Ray Galton and Alan Simpson	7 December 1970	22 November 1970
Harold buys a snooker table, but after paternal resistance encounters a more fundamental obstacle.
41	7	"The Three Feathers"	Duncan Wood	Ray Galton and Alan Simpson	14 December 1970	29 November 1970
Albert gets stuck in a painful yoga position, while Harold reveals a new commode he has just picked up for a bargain price. Guest stars are John Arnatt and John Bailey. The last of the 16 stories adapted into an episode of Sanford and Son renamed "Pot Luck". Also the last episode originally made in colour that exists only as a monochrome telerecording or video copy.
42	8	"Cuckoo in the Nest"	Duncan Wood	Ray Galton and Alan Simpson	21 December 1970	6 December 1970
Albert's long lost Australian son turns up from out of the blue and causes Harold to be very jealous. Featuring Kenneth J. Warren. Survives in colour.

=== Series 7 (1972) ===
Produced in colour. This is the first series to survive completely in colour.

No. overall	No. in series	Title	Directed by	Written by	Original release date	Recorded
43	1	"Men of Letters"	John Howard Davies	Ray Galton and Alan Simpson	21 February 1972	13 February 1972
After a game of Scrabble in which Albert uses several swear words, he and Harold argue over who will write an article for the church's centenary edition of the parish magazine, in front of the vicar (Anthony Sharp).
44	2	"A Star Is Born"	John Howard Davies	Ray Galton and Alan Simpson	28 February 1972	20 February 1972
Harold joins an amateur dramatic society for their latest play, Guilt: The White Man's Burden, at which he is unsuccessful. Guest stars Margaret Nolan of Carry On films fame and Trevor Bannister who went on to fame as Mr Lucas in 'Are You Being Served'.
45	3	"Oh, What a Beautiful Mourning"	John Howard Davies	Ray Galton and Alan Simpson	6 March 1972	27 February 1972
Albert's eldest brother, George, has died, and the thought of another Steptoe funeral depresses Harold, but by the end of all the aggro, Harold and Albert agree that the funeral was worth going to. George A. Cooper and Mollie Sugden guest as relatives only after his late brother's estate.
46	4	"Live Now, P.A.Y.E. Later"	John Howard Davies	Ray Galton and Alan Simpson	13 March 1972	5 March 1972
Harold discovers that Albert has "forgotten" to inform the tax department that his wife has died and has been cashing her pension. They need to get their story straight before the taxman visits. Albert poses as his long-dead wife by dressing in drag. Guest stars Colin Gordon, Edwin Apps, Peter Madden.
47	5	"Loathe Story"	John Howard Davies	Ray Galton and Alan Simpson	20 March 1972	13 March 1972
After he tries to murder Albert in his sleep, Harold visits a psychiatrist to get to the root of his antagonism towards his father. Joanna Lumley guest stars.
48	6	"Divided We Stand"	David Croft	Ray Galton and Alan Simpson	27 March 1972	19 March 1972
After Harold and Albert argue over the decorations, Harold builds a partition through the house to separate himself from Albert, but they continue to argue even through a wall, then a fire puts Harold and Albert in hospital. Premise first discussed in episode 17, "Steptoe à la Cart".
49	7	"The Desperate Hours"	John Howard Davies	Ray Galton and Alan Simpson	3 April 1972	26 March 1972
Harold and Albert struggle to keep warm in the freezing house, then they receive an unexpected visit from two prisoners who recently escaped from Wormwood Scrubs. Guest starring J. G. Devlin and Leonard Rossiter.

=== Christmas Special (1973) ===
No. overall	No. in series	Title	Directed by	Written by	Original release date	Recorded
50	—	"The Party"	Graeme Muir	Ray Galton and Alan Simpson	24 December 1973	3 December 1973
Harold books a Christmas holiday in Majorca, but when it's cancelled, he decides to have a Christmas party instead. The guests all refuse to come in because Harold and Albert both have chickenpox. Featuring Frank Thornton. Originally transmitted in a 46-minute cut. A 42-minute edit was issued on the DVD release. A 'bootleg cut' with the excised scenes restored exists online. The 2024 broadcasts on UK's That's TV is the 42-minute cut, with occasional muting of words and phrases considered unsuitable for a modern audience (as well as a banner warning of "out dated views and language" para)

=== Series 8 (1974) ===
No. overall	No. in series	Title	Directed by	Written by	Original release date	Recorded
51	1	"Back in Fashion"	Douglas Argent	Ray Galton and Alan Simpson	4 September 1974	31 August 1974
A photographer wishes to use the Steptoes' yard as a set for a fashion shoot. The episode's title is not shown onscreen.
52	2	"And So to Bed"	Douglas Argent	Ray Galton and Alan Simpson	11 September 1974	7 September 1974
Planning to bring his new girlfriend home, Harold invests in a waterbed. Also stars Lynn Farleigh as the girlfriend and Angus MacKay as the bed salesman.
53	3	"Porn Yesterday"	Douglas Argent	Ray Galton and Alan Simpson	18 September 1974	14 September 1974
Harold discovers Albert's "dirty" past.
54	4	"The Seven Steptoerai"	Douglas Argent and Mike Crisp	Ray Galton and Alan Simpson	25 September 1974	21 September 1974
Albert gets assistance from the over 65 kung-fu club, when local villain Frankie Barrow (Henry Woolf), starts a protection racket.
55	5	"Upstairs, Downstairs, Upstairs, Downstairs"	Douglas Argent	Ray Galton and Alan Simpson	3 October 1974	28 September 1974
Albert is suffering (or so he says) from a bad back and is bedridden, so Harold has to take care of him on doctor's orders. Featuring Robert James.
56	6	"Seance in a Wet Rag and Bone Yard"	Douglas Argent	Ray Galton and Alan Simpson	10 October 1974	5 October 1974
Clairvoyant Madame Fontana (Patricia Routledge) at Albert's request holds a seance at the Steptoes.

=== Christmas Special (1974) ===
No. overall	No. in series	Title	Directed by	Written by	Original release date	Recorded
57	—	"A Perfect Christmas"	Douglas Argent	Ray Galton and Alan Simpson	26 December 1974	26 October 1974
Final episode. Harold's last attempt to get away abroad for his Christmas Holiday, but he has a cunning plan in mind. Originally transmitted in a 42-minute cut, but also exists as a longer 46-minute edit which was inadventently released by the BBC on home video, before being withdrawn. A 'bootleg cut' of the longer edition exists online. (Original Radio Times title: "A Christmas Holiday", although Galton and Simpson's original script reused the series 1 title "The Holiday") The 2024 broadcast on UK's That's TV is the 42-minute cut, with a banner warning of "out-dated views and language"

== Sketches part of other shows ==
=== Christmas Night with the Stars ===
Christmas Night with the Stars was screened annually on Christmas night when the top stars of the BBC appeared in short versions, typically five to ten minutes; The programme ran from 1958 to 1972 and Steptoe & Son appeared twice in 1962 and 1967.

However the 1962 Christmas segment no longer exists. Only sequences from the 1967 Christmas segment remain and still exist on the original film in the archives. An audio recording for the 1967 sketch exists.

Title	Directed by	Written by	Original release date	Recorded
1962 untitled sketch	Duncan Wood	Ray Galton and Alan Simpson	25 December 1962	23 December 1962
Missing
1967 untitled sketch	Duncan Wood	Ray Galton and Alan Simpson	25 December 1967	23 December 1967
Extracts survive as well as audio

=== Royal Variety Performance ===
The Royal Variety Performance is a variety show held annually to raise money for the Royal Variety Charity consisting family entertainment that includes comedy, music, dance, magic and other speciality acts. It is attended by senior members of British royalty. The 1963 edition included a Steptoe and Son sketch and was broadcast on ITV on 10 November 1963. The audio of this sketch was also released by Pye Records. A film recording of this sketch exists.

Title	Written by	Original release date	Recorded
"Steptoe & Son at Buckingham Palace"	Alan Simpson, Ray Galton	10 November 1963	4 November 1963
Harold is trying to go up-market by totting in Pall Mall. However, he is horrified when he finds Albert has been helping by asking for scrap at Buckingham Palace!

=== The Ken Dodd Show ===
The Ken Dodd Show was a variety show presented by Ken Dodd broadcast live from Blackpool. This July 1966 edition featured a Steptoe and Son sketch. A film recording of this sketch exists.

Title	Written by	Original release date	Recorded
1966 untitled sketch	Ray Galton and Alan Simpson	24 July 1966	24 July 1966
Harold and Albert go to Blackpool for a day at the beach.

== Radio series ==
Between 1966 and 1976, 52 episodes of Steptoe and Son were adapted for radio; these were remakes of the TV episodes specifically tailored for a radio audience (not TV soundtrack recordings). Series 1 & 2 were broadcast on the BBC Light Programme in 1966 and 1967. Series 3–6 and a final Christmas Special were broadcast on BBC Radio 2 between 1971 and 1976. All radio episodes produced by Bobby Jaye.

=== Series 1 (1966) ===
No. overall	No. in series	Title	Written by	Adapted by	Original release date
1	1	"The Offer"	Ray Galton and Alan Simpson	Gale Pedrick	3 July 1966
2	2	"The Bird"	Ray Galton and Alan Simpson	Gale Pedrick	10 July 1966
3	3	"Sixty-five Today"	Ray Galton and Alan Simpson	Gale Pedrick	17 July 1966
4	4	"The Stepmother"	Ray Galton and Alan Simpson	Gale Pedrick	24 July 1966
5	5	"The Economist"	Ray Galton and Alan Simpson	Gale Pedrick	31 July 1966
6	6	"Wallah-Wallah Catsmeat"	Ray Galton and Alan Simpson	Gale Pedrick	7 August 1966
7	7	"The Diploma"	Ray Galton and Alan Simpson	Gale Pedrick	14 August 1966
8	8	"Steptoe ala Carte"	Ray Galton and Alan Simpson	Gale Pedrick	21 August 1966
9	9	"The Holiday"	Ray Galton and Alan Simpson	Gale Pedrick	28 August 1966
10	10	"The Bath"	Ray Galton and Alan Simpson	Gale Pedrick	4 September 1966
11	11	"The Lead Man Cometh"	Ray Galton and Alan Simpson	Gale Pedrick	11 September 1966
12	12	"The Musical Evening"	Ray Galton and Alan Simpson	Gale Pedrick	18 September 1966
13	13	"The Bonds That Bind Us"	Ray Galton and Alan Simpson	Gale Pedrick	25 September 1966

=== Series 2 (1967) ===
No. overall	No. in series	Title	Written by	Adapted by	Original release date
14	1	"The Siege of Steptoe Street"	Ray Galton and Alan Simpson	Gale Pedrick	11 June 1967
15	2	"Pilgrim's Progress"	Ray Galton and Alan Simpson	Gale Pedrick	18 June 1967
16	3	"The Wooden Overcoats"	Ray Galton and Alan Simpson	Gale Pedrick	25 June 1967
17	4	"Sunday for Seven Days"	Ray Galton and Alan Simpson	Gale Pedrick	2 July 1967
18	5	"The Piano"	Ray Galton and Alan Simpson	Gale Pedrick	9 July 1967
19	6	"My Old Man's a Tory"	Ray Galton and Alan Simpson	Gale Pedrick	16 July 1967
20	7	"Homes Fit for Heroes"	Ray Galton and Alan Simpson	Gale Pedrick	23 July 1967
21	8	"Crossed Swords"	Ray Galton and Alan Simpson	Gale Pedrick	30 July 1967

=== Series 3 (1971) ===
No. overall	No. in series	Title	Written and adapted by	Original release date
22	1	"A Death in the Family"	Ray Galton and Alan Simpson	21 March 1971
23	2	"Two's Company"	Ray Galton and Alan Simpson	28 March 1971
24	3	"Tea for Two"	Ray Galton and Alan Simpson	4 April 1971
25	4	"T.B. Or Not T.B."	Ray Galton and Alan Simpson	11 April 1971
26	5	"Without Prejudice"	Ray Galton and Alan Simpson	18 April 1971
27	6	"Cuckoo in the Nest"	Ray Galton and Alan Simpson	25 April 1971
28	7	"Steptoe and Son -and Son"	Ray Galton and Alan Simpson	2 May 1971
29	8	"Robbery with Violence"	Ray Galton and Alan Simpson	9 May 1971

=== Series 4 (1972) ===
No. overall	No. in series	Title	Written and adapted by	Original release date
30	1	"Full House"	Ray Galton and Alan Simpson	30 January 1972
31	2	"Is That Your Horse Outside?"	Ray Galton and Alan Simpson	6 February 1972
32	3	"The Lodger"	Ray Galton and Alan Simpson	13 February 1972
33	4	"A Box in Town"	Ray Galton and Alan Simpson	20 February 1972
34	5	"The Three Feathers"	Ray Galton and Alan Simpson	27 February 1972
35	6	"The Colour Problem"	Ray Galton and Alan Simpson	5 March 1972
36	7	"And Afterwards At..."	Ray Galton and Alan Simpson	12 March 1972
37	8	"Any Old Iron"	Ray Galton and Alan Simpson	19 March 1972

=== Series 5 (1974) ===
No. overall	No. in series	Title	Written and adapted by	Original release date
38	1	"The Desperate Hours"	Ray Galton and Alan Simpson	26 May 1974
39	2	"Come Dancing"	Ray Galton and Alan Simpson	2 June 1974
40	3	"A Star is Born"	Ray Galton and Alan Simpson	9 June 1974
41	4	"A Winter's Tale"	Ray Galton and Alan Simpson	16 June 1974
42	5	"Men of Property"	Ray Galton and Alan Simpson	23 June 1974
43	6	"Men of Letters"	Ray Galton and Alan Simpson	30 June 1974

=== Series 6 (1976) ===
No. overall	No. in series	Title	Written and adapted by	Original release date
44	1	"Loathe Story"	Ray Galton and Alan Simpson	8 February 1976
45	2	"Oh What a Beautiful Mourning"	Ray Galton and Alan Simpson	15 February 1976
46	3	"Live Now P.A.Y.E. Later"	Ray Galton and Alan Simpson	22 February 1976
47	4	"Upstairs Downstairs, Upstairs Downstairs"	Ray Galton and Alan Simpson	29 February 1976
48	5	"And So to Bed"	Ray Galton and Alan Simpson	7 March 1976
49	6	"Porn Yesterday"	Ray Galton and Alan Simpson	14 March 1976
50	7	"The Seven Steptoerai"	Ray Galton and Alan Simpson	21 March 1976
51	8	"Seance in a Wet Rag and Bone Yard"	Ray Galton and Alan Simpson	28 March 1976

=== Christmas special (1976) ===
No. overall	No. in series	Title	Written and adapted by	Original release date
52	—	"Away for Christmas"	Ray Galton and Alan Simpson	25 December 1976
based on the 1974 TV Xmas Special

== Films (1972–73) ==
Two spin-off films were released in 1972 and 1973.

Title	Directed by	Written by	Original release date
Steptoe and Son	Cliff Owen	Ray Galton and Alan Simpson	23 March 1972
Harold marries a stripper, Zita, who subsequently leaves him.
Steptoe and Son Ride Again	Peter Sykes	Ray Galton and Alan Simpson	6 July 1973
Intending on buying a horse, Harold is conned into buying a blind greyhound instead from local gangster Frankie Barrow. To pay off their debts, Albert fakes his own death to collect on his life insurance.

== Records ==
Steptoe and Son Pye/Golden Guinea (GGL 0217), 1963, with new audio recordings produced by Gale Pedrick:

Side A
- The Bird
Side B
- "The Gentle Art of Totting" - extract from The Diploma
- "Choppers for Sale" - extract from The Economist
- The Holiday - condensed version

More Junk from Steptoe and Son Pye/Golden Guinea (GGL 0278), 1964, with new audio recordings produced by Gale Pedrick:

Side A
- The Stepmother
Side B
- The Musical Evening

Steptoe and Son Ride Again Pye/Golden Guinea (GGL 0465), 1970, with new audio recordings:

Side A
- The Joys of Smoking - adapted from T.B. or Not T.B.?
Side B
- A Pregnant Situation - adapted from Steptoe and Son – and Son!

== Other ==
=== When Steptoe Met Son (2002) ===
Title	First broadcast	Notes
When Steptoe Met Son	20 August 2002	Documentary about the personal lives of Harry H. Corbett & Wilfrid Brambell.

=== The Curse of Steptoe (2008) ===
Title	First broadcast	Notes
The Curse of Steptoe	19 March 2008	Television play about the relationship between Wilfrid Brambell and Harry H. Corbett.

=== Steptoe and Son in Murder at Oil Drum Lane (2005) ===
Title	Notes
Steptoe and Son in Murder at Oil Drum Lane	Stage play that brings the Steptoe saga to an end.
