= The Bargee =

1964 British comedy film by Duncan Wood

- Original British quad poster by Tom Chantrell
- Directed by: Duncan Wood
- Written by: Ray Galton; Alan Simpson
- Produced by: W.A. Whittaker
- Starring: Harry H. Corbett; Hugh Griffith; Eric Sykes; Julia Foster; Ronnie Barker; Eric Barker; Miriam Karlin
- Cinematography: Harry Waxman
- Edited by: Richard Best
- Music by: Frank Cordell
- Production company: ABPC/Galton-Simpson
- Distributed by: Warner-Pathé Distributors
- Release date: 23 April 1964 (UK)
- Running time: 106 mins
- Country: United Kingdom
- Language: English

The Bargee is a 1964 British comedy film shot in Techniscope directed by Duncan Wood, and starring Harry H. Corbett, Hugh Griffith, Eric Sykes and Ronnie Barker. The screenplay was by Ray Galton and Alan Simpson.

== Plot ==
Hemel Pike and his cousin Ronnie are two boatmen operating a canal-boat and its butty for British Waterways on the Grand Union Canal. Although the canals are struggling due to declining traffic, Hemel refuses to give up his traditional lifestyle. He also enjoys his reputation as a Don Juan, with girlfriends all across the canal network, something of which Ronnie is envious.

Hemel and Ronnie set out from Brentford to Boxmoor, repeatedly encountering an inept "mariner" in a small pleasure craft. At Rickmansworth, Hemel visits one of his lovers, a barmaid called Nellie, but he has to make a quick exit when she accidentally learns about his other girlfriends. Hemel and Ronnie reach Boxmoor, where they deliver their cargo before travelling on empty towards Birmingham. En route, Hemel meets up with another girlfriend.

Hemel's next call is Leg O'Mutton Lock to meet Christine, the daughter of lock-keeper Joe Turnbull. Hemel thinks highly of Christine, but knows that Joe loathes the thought of his daughter becoming associated with a canal worker. On arrival, Ronnie takes Joe to the local pub to get him out of the way while Hemel and Christine get together. Christine, who hates the idea of living on a boat, attempts to persuade Hemel to leave the canal and get a job on land, but Hemel refuses, alarmed by her talk of marriage and settling down. Then he narrowly escapes from being caught by Joe who returns home drunk after being tricked into a drinking competition and delayed by Ronnie, in order to give Hemel more time alone with Christine.

After Hemel and Ronnie have left for Birmingham, Joe discovers that Christine is pregnant. Dismayed and angry, and having learned from Christine that the father is one of the canal workers, Joe drains the canal pound, padlocks the lock gates, and attaches a home-made bomb, and announces that he will prevent any traffic from passing through until the father comes forward. After various attempts to get him to stop have failed, Hemel and Ronnie arrive and, seeing the commotion and Christine being harassed by the locals, Hemel admits that he is the father.

Joe allows Hemel to stay in the spare room in his house until he and Christine can be married, and Hemel tries to find a job on land, but he misses the lifestyle and independence he enjoyed on the canals.

At their wedding reception, Christine tells Hemel that she has a wedding gift for him and takes him to the canal where he sees that his boats have been renamed Hemel and Christine. She tells him that Ronnie has learned that all working-boats are to be withdrawn from the canals in 18 months time, and that she will agree to live on the boats on the canal with him and their baby until they are withdrawn, so that his family, who have been on the canals since the beginning, will be there at the end as well.

== Cast ==
- Harry H. Corbett as Hemel Pike, so named because his parents were berthed in Hemel Hempstead when he was born
- Hugh Griffith as Joe Turnbull
- Eric Sykes as the Mariner
- Ronnie Barker as Ronnie
- Julia Foster as Christine Turnbull
- Miriam Karlin as Nellie Marsh
- Eric Barker as Mr Parkes, the foreman
- Derek Nimmo as Dr. Scott
- Norman Bird as Albert Williams, the waterways supervisor
- Richard Briers as Tomkins
- Brian Wilde as policeman
- Ronnie Brody as Ted Croxley
- George A. Cooper as Mr Williams, office official
- Ed Devereaux as boat man
- Wally Patch as bargee
- Michael Robbins as bargee
- Jo Rowbottom (credited as Jo Rowbotham) as Cynthia
- Grazina Frame as office secretary
- Una Stubbs as bridesmaid
- Eileen Way as onlooker
- Rita Webb as onlooker and wedding guest
- Patricia Hayes as onlooker
- Godfrey Winn as announcer
- Edwin Apps as George the barman

== Release ==
The film opened at London's Empire Cinema on Leicester Square on 23 April 1964.

== Reception ==
=== Box office ===
Kinematograph Weekly called the film a "money maker" for 1964.

=== Critical ===
The Monthly Film Bulletin wrote: "When television producer Duncan Wood set about making his first film he presumably hoped that The Bargee would be just the job for the Steptoe fans. Same team – same responses. But the Galton and Simpson product goes only to show that what may make a genial bit of fun on the small screen sounds – and looks – intolerably vulgar on the big one. The jokes ply a dreary course between the titter about a would-be mariner who 'won't be happy till he's got a wooden leg' and Nellie's pale-blue threat, 'You won't have much to offer 'em when I've finished with you'. Corbett's nasal intonations sound both repellent and phoney in a film that nibbles at sociological nostalgia at some points (the narrow-boats are fast disappearing . . .) and at others sets Derek Nimmo doing an lan Carmichael act as a callow young doctor."

Variety wrote: "The Steptoe influence looms large and has thrown this yarn of a bargee off balance. With a refreshing new background of the British waterways, a capable cast and an acceptable enough yarn, it still fails to click, though it will provide spasmodic amusement for the easygoing. ... A brisker pace, a little less (or a little more) genuine slapstick and considerably more gaiety could have made The Bargee a far more tempting vehicle than it is."

The Radio Times Guide to Films gave the film 2/5 stars, writing: "Having failed to make an international movie star out of Tony Hancock with The Rebel, Ray Galton and Alan Simpson tried to fashion a film comedy for their Steptoe and Son protégé Harry H. Corbett. However, in spite of the presence of a number of comic luminaries, the result is disappointing. The poverty of the plot (in which Corbett's "Lothario of the Locks" is duped into matrimony) is nothing next to its intrinsic sexism."

Leslie Halliwell said: "The long-awaited comedy which was supposed to make a film star out of TV's Young Steptoe turned out to be rough and vulgar but not very funny."

== See also ==
The film Flood Tide (1934) also has a story with canal and inland waterway footage.
