= Sheila Steafel =

South African-born British actress (1935–2019)

- Steafel in Daleks' Invasion Earth 2150 A.D. (1966)
- Born: Sheila Frances Steafel; 26 May 1935; Johannesburg, South Africa
- Died: 23 August 2019 (aged 84); London, England
- Education: Webber Douglas Academy of Dramatic Art
- Occupations: Film, radio, stage and television actress
- Years active: 1957–2019
- Spouse: Harry H. Corbett (m. 1958; div. 1964)

Sheila Frances Steafel (26 May 1935 – 23 August 2019) was a British actress, who was born in Johannesburg, but lived all her adult life in the United Kingdom.

== Life and career ==
Steafel, who was born in Johannesburg, trained at the Webber Douglas Academy of Dramatic Art. She appeared in many television series, including The Frost Report, Z-Cars, Sykes, Dave Allen at Large, The Kenny Everett Television Show, Minder, The Ghosts of Motley Hall, Oh, Brother!, You Must Be the Husband and The Laughter of a Fool. She was a regular in the BBC One music hall programme The Good Old Days, portraying her comic creation "Miss Popsy Wopsy", who invariably "played up" to chairman Leonard Sachs. She was also a regular on the "Tommy Cooper Hour".

In February 2018, she appeared in the daytime comedy-drama Shakespeare & Hathaway: Private Investigators Episode 2 as care home resident Dora Bentley.

Her film appearances included Daleks' Invasion Earth 2150 A.D. (1966), Just like a Woman (1967), Quatermass and the Pit (1967), Baby Love (1968), Otley (1968), Goodbye, Mr. Chips (1969), The Smashing Bird I Used to Know (1969), Some Will, Some Won't (1970; co-starring her ex-husband's acting partner, Wilfrid Brambell), Tropic of Cancer (1970; as Tania), Percy (1971), Melody (1971), Digby, the Biggest Dog in the World (1973), All I Want Is You... and You... and You... (1974), Never Too Young to Rock (1975), Are You Being Served? (1977), What's Up Superdoc! (1978), Bloodbath at the House of Death (1984), Parting Shots (1999), The 10th Kingdom (2000), and Back to the Secret Garden (2001).

Steafel also worked in BBC Radio. In the 1970s and 1980s, she was a cast member on the weekly Radio 4 satirical show Week Ending, providing the voices of many characters and impersonating real-life figures, such as Margaret Thatcher. Steafel appeared as herself alongside Simon Jones in "The Lost Hitch-Hiker's Sketch", a sketch written by Douglas Adams for her 1982 Radio 4 show Steafel Plus.

In 1979 she starred in the West End stage production of A Day in Hollywood/A Night in the Ukraine in a number of roles, including that of Harpo Marx. In 2008, she was portrayed by Zoe Tapper in the BBC television play The Curse of Steptoe.

Her 1982 Edinburgh Fringe show was featured in the Edinburgh Evening News "Critics' Choice", which described it as a memorable one-woman show that was "packed with top-class comedy material from a very talented performer".

In 2015 she lent her voice to the character Master Matoya in the video game Final Fantasy XIV: Heavensward.

== Published works ==
In 1998, Steafel released a CD album of Victorian songs entitled Victoria Plums (Redial/Polygram No. CD 557 209–2). In 2010, she released her autobiography When Harry Met Sheila. In 2012, Steafel published a collection of real life short stories under the title Bastards.

== Personal life ==
Steafel was married to actor and comedian Harry H. Corbett from October 1958 until August 1964. She died of cancer in 2019.

== Partial filmography ==
- Daleks' Invasion Earth 2150 A.D. (1966) - Young Woman
- Just like a Woman (1967) - Isolde
- Quatermass and the Pit (1967) - Journalist
- Monsieur Lecoq (1967)
- The Bliss of Mrs. Blossom (1968) - Pet shop saleslady
- Otley (1968) - Ground stewardess
- Baby Love (1969) - Tessa Pearson
- The Smashing Bird I Used to Know (1969) - Young Woman
- Goodbye, Mr. Chips (1969) - Tilly (uncredited)
- Tropic of Cancer (1970) - Tania
- Some Will, Some Won't (1970) - Sheila Wilcott
- Percy (1971) - Mrs. Gold
- Up Pompeii (1971) - Voluptua (voice, uncredited)
- Melody (1971) - Mrs Latimer
- To Catch a Spy (1971) - Woman in lift
- Digby, the Biggest Dog in the World (1973) - Control Operator
- All I Want Is You... and You... and You... (1975) - Wilma Brack
- Never Too Young to Rock (1976) - Cafe Proprietress
- The Ghosts of Motley Hall (TV, 1976–1978) - The White Lady
- Are You Being Served? (1977) - Hat Customer
- What's Up Superdoc! (1978) - Dr. Pitt
- The Quiz Kid (1979) - Brenda
- Bloodbath at the House of Death (1984) - Sheila Finch
- Parting Shots (1999) - President's Wife
- Back to the Secret Garden (2001) - Mrs. Chillblaine
