= Come Dancing (disambiguation) =

Come Dancing is a British ballroom dancing competition show.

Come Dancing may also refer to:

- "Come Dancing" (song)
- "Come Dancing" (The Goodies)
- "Come Dancing" (Steptoe and Son)
- "Come Dancing" (The Upper Hand)

== See also ==
- Come Dancing with The Kinks
