= When Steptoe Met Son =

2002 British TV documentary

- Country of origin: United Kingdom
- Original language: English

Original release
- Network: Channel 4
- Release: 2002

When Steptoe Met Son is a 2002 Channel 4 documentary about the personal lives of Wilfrid Brambell and Harry H. Corbett, the stars of the long-running BBC situation comedy, Steptoe and Son. It aired on 20 August 2002.

The programme reveals how Brambell and Corbett were highly dissimilar to their on-screen characters. Corbett felt he had a promising career as a serious actor, but was trapped by his role as Harold and forced to keep returning to the series after typecasting limited his choice of work. Brambell, meanwhile, was a homosexual, something that in the 1960s was still frowned upon by traditional British society and, until the Sexual Offences Act 1967 came into force in England and Wales, illegal, and was thus driven underground. The documentary went on to claim that during an ill-fated final tour of Australia the already strained relationship between Corbett and Brambell finally broke down for good.

== See also ==
- The Curse of Steptoe
