= The Curse of Steptoe =

2008 British TV play

- Phil Davis and Jason Isaacs recreating the roles of Steptoe and Son
- Written by: Brian Fillis
- Directed by: Michael Samuels
- Starring: Jason Isaacs; Phil Davis; Roger Allam; Zoe Tapper; Burn Gorman; Rory Kinnear; Clare Higgins
- Country of origin: United Kingdom

Production
- Executive producers: Ben Evans and John Yorke
- Producer: Ben Bickerton
- Running time: 66 min.

Original release
- Network: BBC Four
- Release: 19 March 2008

The Curse of Steptoe is a television play about the on- and off-screen relationship of Harry H. Corbett and Wilfrid Brambell during the making of their iconic BBC sitcom Steptoe and Son. The drama, which stars Jason Isaacs as Corbett and Phil Davis as Brambell, was written by Brian Fillis, who also wrote the similarly-themed drama Fear of Fanny about the off-screen behaviour of television personality Fanny Cradock. The 66-minute film The Curse of Steptoe was first broadcast on 19 March 2008 on BBC Four as part of a season of dramas about television personalities. It was directed by Michael Samuels and produced by Ben Bickerton.

The drama was widely acclaimed by critics and won the 2008 Royal Television Society Award for best "Single Drama". However, the TV play generated controversy due to its inaccurate fictionalisation of the story despite being based on interviews with the actors' colleagues, friends and family, and Steptoe's writers, Ray Galton and Alan Simpson. Following numerous complaints, especially from the Corbett family, the drama was re-edited twice before being shown in repeat broadcasts. Despite these revisions, an investigation by the BBC Trust found that the drama was still unfair and inaccurate. All DVDs of the drama have been withdrawn from sale and no future broadcasts will occur without further editing.

== Plot ==
The play covers the entire history of the televised series, skipping over the five-year break between 1965 and 1970 when no episodes were recorded. It starts with Corbett, then a rising Shakespearean actor, starring as Richard II at Joan Littlewood's Theatre Workshop at the Theatre Royal, Stratford East, looking beyond that to Henry V at the Old Vic, and tipped to eclipse Gielgud. Meanwhile, across town at the BBC Television Centre, writers Galton and Simpson are no longer working on scripts for comedian Tony Hancock, and are given a free hand. They write a series of one-off plays starring actors, not comics who will expect every line to contain a laugh.

The Offer, in which they cast Corbett, is wildly successful and evolves into an uneasy, decade-long comedy partnership between Corbett and the alcoholic, self-loathing gay man Brambell. Corbett's stage career fades quickly from typecasting, and his first marriage to comic actress Sheila Steafel suffers from his womanising, while Brambell's drinking and his relaxed approach to acting cause conflict between him and Corbett, a method actor once described as "the British Marlon Brando". Off-screen, Brambell is secretive and dislikes the trappings of fame, and his worst fears are realised when, entrapped by a policeman in a public toilet, he is prosecuted for persistently importuning for an immoral purpose, and the details of his failed marriage are published in the newspapers.

The show, and the actors' careers, are milked dry. Corbett is unable to obtain work that is not a variation on his cockney rag and bone man persona. At the start, Corbett as Richard II had spoken the words "I wasted time and now doth time waste me", and at the end he says them to himself as he awaits his cue in a live recording of Steptoe and Son. Finally Corbett is unable to find any work except pantomime or a stage version of Steptoe in Australia.

== Cast ==
- Roger Allam as Tom Sloan
- Jason Isaacs as Harry H. Corbett
- Zoë Tapper as Sheila Steafel
- Sophie Hunter as Maureen Corbett
- Clare Higgins as Joan Littlewood
- Julian Forsyth as Clive Goodwin
- Burn Gorman as Ray Galton
- Rory Kinnear as Alan Simpson
- Phil Davis as Wilfrid Brambell
- Ken Oxtoby as Costume Designer
- Ben Parr as Wilfrid's Young Blonde Man
- Peter Hamilton-Dyer as Director
- Jamie Lennox as Plain Clothes Policeman
- Scott McNess as Boy Outside Theatre
- Buddy Wallis as Harry's Son
- Elspeth Rae as Young Blonde Actress

== Broadcast ==
The original version of The Curse of Steptoe and it subsequent revisions were shown on the following dates:

Date	Time	Channel	Running Time	Notes
19 March 2008	21:00	BBC Four	66 min 44 sec	Original release
20 March 2008	00:05	BBC Four	66 min 44 sec	Original repeat
21 March 2008	22:00	BBC Four	66 min 44 sec	Original repeat
23 March 2008	22:45	BBC Four	66 min 44 sec	Original repeat
28 December 2008	22:30	BBC Four	66 min 21 sec	Second revised repeat
29 December 2008	03:40	BBC Four	66 min 21 sec	Second revised repeat
2 December 2009	22:00	BBC HD	65 min 35 sec	Third revised repeat

== Reception ==
The 19 March 2008, broadcast of The Curse of Steptoe brought BBC Four its highest audience figures, estimated as 1.41 million viewers, a 7 per cent share of multichannel audiences between 9.00pm and 10.05pm, based on overnight returns. Reviews were good. The Guardian described the two stars as "striking, like Walter Matthau and George Burns in The Odd Couple [sic]" (cf. The Sunshine Boys), and The Times praised "the tough, funny, sad script... and the subtly glorious performances". The Independent's reviewer said, "Anyone who remembers David Barrie's Channel 4 documentary When Steptoe Met Son, broadcast in 2002, won't have found all this particularly revelatory, but Isaacs and Davis played it so well that it had a fresh life."

The drama won the Royal Television Society Award 2008 for "Single Drama", beating Margaret Thatcher - The Long Walk To Finchley and The Shooting of Thomas Hurndall. However, the Royal Television Society have since added a caveat to the award that "since the award presentation to The Curse of Steptoe, complaints about the programme were made to the BBC Trust which found it to be 'unfair and inaccurate'".

== Factual inaccuracies ==
Following the broadcast, Harry H. Corbett's nephew from his second marriage released a statement which claimed the drama was inaccurate and defamatory. In addition to numerous factual errors, he claimed that the two actors did not hate each other, and that the suggestion that Steptoe and Son ruined either actor's career was nonsense.

The writers of Steptoe and Son, Ray Galton and Alan Simpson, also distanced themselves from the drama, stating in a letter to The Times published shortly before the drama was aired that "during this entire [12 year] period we were unaware of any conflict between the actors save from the occasional gritting of Wilfrid's false teeth when Harry had the perceived audacity to give him a little direction. At all other times they were the acme of professionalism." In a radio interview on 15 January 2009 Alan Simpson stated that the drama was "not at all accurate", while Ray Galton claimed, "We didn't recognise any of that. Really didn't." Both agreed that any notion of friction or hatred between Corbett and Brambell was inaccurate, stating, "They worked beautifully together."

== Complaints upheld ==
On 1 October 2008, the BBC Editorial Complaints Unit upheld a complaint by the brother-in-law of Harry H. Corbett, regarding comments made by Phil Davis in an interview on BBC Breakfast. Davis gave the impression that The Curse of Steptoe was entirely factual and claimed that Brambell and Corbett loathed each other, whereas the balance of first-hand evidence is that this was by no means the case.

On 24 November 2008, the BBC Editorial Complaints Unit upheld another complaint by Corbett's brother-in-law regarding the drama itself. It ruled that the drama gave the impression that Corbett's relationship with his second wife (Maureen Corbett) "preceded, and might have contributed to, the breakdown of his first marriage to Sheila Steafel, whereas the chronology it had established did not support this. The drama also gave the impression that the end of Steptoe and Son was immediately preceded, if not precipitated, by the birth of Corbett's first child. However, the two events were separated by eight years, so the device tended to mislead viewers significantly on an aspect of the narrative central to their interest in the drama." The drama would not be re-broadcast without appropriate editing and content information.

A revised version of the drama was broadcast on 28 and 29 December 2008 on BBC Four, running 23 seconds shorter than the original, and preceded by an on-screen disclaimer: "The following drama is inspired by the lives of real people. For the purpose of the narrative some events have been invented or conflated."

The BBC Trust Editorial Standards Committee partially upheld a complaints appeal by Corbett's brother-in-law, stating on 30 June 2009 that "the essential elements of unfairness to Maureen Corbett were still present in the revised version of the programme, and that this constituted a breach of the Fairness and Accuracy guidelines". In particular, "the timeline of the drama with regard to the relationship between Maureen and Harry, and Harry's separation from his first wife, did not correlate with the facts", and "the implication in the drama that the child of Maureen and Harry had been conceived as a result of a casual relationship between the two was inaccurate and unfair". The Trust also warned the BBC that, "while it was the right of dramatists to change events for dramatic purposes, the basic facts should remain as a framework on which to build the drama". The Trust also thought the on-screen caption could have been clearer, and warned that "the use of captions such as this should not be regarded as a 'blank cheque' for the indiscriminate and excessive use of dramatic licence". Once again, the drama would not be shown again until further editing had taken place.

A third, re-revised version of the drama was broadcast on 2 December 2009 on BBC HD, now running 69 seconds shorter than the original. The same version was released on a BBC DVD, Legends of Comedy, on 14 June 2010, together with two other episodes from the drama series, Frankie Howerd Rather You Than Me and Hughie Green Most Sincerely.

On 22 December 2010 the BBC Trust Editorial Standards Committee upheld a further appeal by Corbett's brother-in-law. The ruling stated that the revised portrayal in The Curse of Steptoe was still "unfair and inaccurate", and, "despite the edits made, further action was required by the BBC to remove the impression of a casual relationship between Maureen and Harry". The BBC Trust subsequently ordered that DVDs of the drama should be recalled.

On 23 March 2011 the BBC Trust Editorial Standards Committee published a report into the withdrawal of the DVDs. Evidently the publisher 2Entertain had failed to inform the BBC Shop that the DVD should be withdrawn, and sales had continued until 3 January 2011. 2Entertain subsequently instructed its lawyers to perform a worldwide trawl to ensure that no other retailers were still selling the DVD. The Committee was concerned by the failure to withdraw The Curse of Steptoe from sale in a timely manner, but was satisfied that the problem had been treated seriously and that steps had been taken to prevent similar issues in the future. It also "wished to apologise on behalf of the BBC for the original editorial breaches in The Curse of Steptoe and the fact that subsequent remedial action had been ineffective in removing the unfairness."

== BBC guideline changes ==
After complaints about The Curse of Steptoe were upheld, the BBC Trust said that it would write to the BBC Executive requesting that the BBC Editorial Guidelines be revised to address dramatised biopics (also termed "docudrama") with regard to the presentation of fact and the use of dramatic licence. The new guidelines were published on 12 October 2010, with Section 6.4.29 specifically addressing "Portrayal of Real People in Drama". Where the drama goes against the wishes of the individual portrayed or their surviving near relatives, approval must be sought from the BBC's Director of Editorial Policy and Standards, and will be given only if three criteria are met: (1) the portrayal is fair; (2) the portrayal is based on a substantial and well-sourced body of evidence whenever practicable; and (3) there is a clear public interest.

Shortly after the BBC Trust upheld the further appeal by Corbett's brother-in-law on 22 December 2010, it was announced that the drama's Executive Producer, Ben Evans, had been made redundant by the BBC, along with 21 other holders of drama production posts. Evans confirmed to The Stage newspaper that he was leaving the BBC, but refused to comment on whether his redundancy was compulsory or voluntary.

== See also ==
- Steptoe and Son
- When Steptoe Met Son
- Hancock and Joan
- Kenneth Williams: Fantabulosa!
- Hattie
- Eric and Ernie
