= Wilfrid Brambell =

Irish actor (1912–1985)

- Brambell in 1966 (photo by Duffy)
- Born: Henry Wilfrid Brambell; 22 March 1912; Dublin, Ireland
- Died: 18 January 1985 (aged 72); London, England
- Occupation: Actor
- Years active: 1930–1985
- Spouse: Mary Hall (m. 1948; div. 1955)

Henry Wilfrid Brambell (22 March 1912 – 18 January 1985) was an Irish actor. He was best known for playing the grubby rag-and-bone man Albert Steptoe alongside Harry H. Corbett in the long-running BBC television sitcom Steptoe and Son (1962–1965, 1970–1974). He achieved international recognition in 1964 for his appearance alongside the Beatles in A Hard Day's Night, playing the fictional grandfather of Paul McCartney.

== Early life ==
Brambell was born on 22 March 1912 in Dublin, the youngest of three sons born to Henry Lytton Brambell (1870–1937), a cashier at the Guinness Brewery, and his wife, Edith Marks (1879–1965), a former opera singer.

Brambell's first experience as an actor was as a child, entertaining the wounded troops during the First World War. After leaving school, he worked part-time as a reporter for The Irish Times and part-time as an actor at the Abbey Theatre before becoming a professional actor for the Gate Theatre. He also did repertory at Swansea, Bristol, and Chesterfield.

In the Second World War, he joined the British military forces entertainment organisation Entertainments National Service Association (ENSA).

== Acting career ==
Brambell had roles in film and television from 1947, his first being an uncredited appearance in Odd Man Out as a tram passenger. His television career began during the 1950s, when he was cast in small roles in three Nigel Kneale/Rudolph Cartier productions for BBC Television: as a drunk in The Quatermass Experiment (1953), as both an old man in a pub and later a prisoner in Nineteen Eighty-Four (1954), and as a tramp in Quatermass II (1955).

He played Jacob, an immigrant from eastern Europe selling newspapers in Paris, in an episode of Maigret entitled "A Man of Quality", first broadcast on 12 December 1960.

All of these roles earned Brambell a reputation for playing old men, despite being aged in his 40s. He appeared in the short film series Scotland Yard in the episode, "The Grand Junction Case". He appeared as Bill Gaye in the 1962 Maurice Chevalier/Hayley Mills picture, In Search of the Castaways. He was heard on the original London cast recording of the long-running West End stage musical The Canterbury Tales in which he starred at London's Phoenix Theatre.

Brambell was featured in many prominent theatre roles. In 1966, he played Ebenezer Scrooge in a musical version of A Christmas Carol. This was adapted for radio the same year and was broadcast on the BBC Light Programme on Christmas Eve. Brambell's booming baritone voice surprised many listeners: he played the role straight, true to the Dickens original. In 1971, he starred in the premiere of Eric Chappell's play, The Banana Box, in which he played Rooksby. This was adapted for television under the name Rising Damp, with the character of Rooksby renamed Rigsby and played by Leonard Rossiter. Brambell also played Bert Thomson, an Irish widower, in the film Holiday on the Buses; the character in question started a close friendship with Stan Butler's mother, Mabel.

=== Steptoe and Son and A Hard Day's Night ===
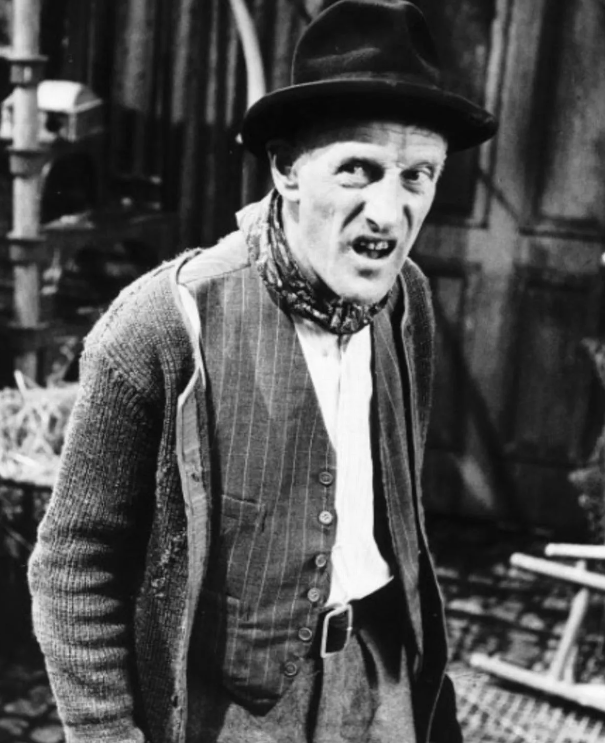
Albert Steptoe as portrayed by Wilfrid Brambell, 1960s

It was Brambell's ability to play old men that led to his casting in his best-remembered role as Albert Steptoe, the irascible father in Steptoe and Son, a man who, when the series began, was said to be in his sixties, even though Brambell was only aged 49 in 1962 (thirteen years older than Harry H. Corbett, who played his son Harold). The series began as a pilot on the BBC's Comedy Playhouse, and its success led to the commissioning of a full series. It ran from 1962 to 1974, including a five-year hiatus. A constant thread throughout the series was Albert being referred to by Harold as a "dirty old man"; for example, when he was eating pickled onions while taking a bath and retrieving dropped ones from the bathwater. There were also two feature film spin-offs, a stage show, and an American incarnation titled Sanford and Son, some episodes of which were almost exact remakes of the original British scripts.

The success of Steptoe and Son made Brambell a high-profile figure on British television and earned him the supporting role of Paul McCartney's grandfather in the Beatles' first film, A Hard Day's Night (1964). A running joke is made throughout the film of his character being "a very clean old man", in contrast to his being referred to as a "dirty old man" in Steptoe and Son. In real life, he was indeed nothing like his Steptoe persona, being dapper and well-spoken. He notably spoke with a distinct received pronunciation accent, in strong contrast to both his Cockney Steptoe accent and his native Irish accent, which he would use where the role dictated. In 1965, Brambell told the BBC that he did not want to do another series of Steptoe and Son, and in September that year, he travelled to New York City to appear in the Broadway musical Kelly at the Broadhurst Theatre. It closed after a single performance.

He also released two 45-rpm singles: "Second Hand"/"Rag Time Ragabone Man", (Parlophone Records R5058), in 1963, in the guise of his Steptoe and Son character; followed in 1971 by "The Decimal Song", with "Time Marches On", (his tribute to the Beatles), on the b-side, which was released on CBS Records International 7062.

=== Later career ===
After the final series of Steptoe and Son concluded in 1974 Brambell had some guest roles in films and on television. He and Corbett also undertook a tour of Australia and New Zealand in 1977-78, in a stage production based on Steptoe and Son. He and Corbett appeared together in character for the last time in a 1981 advertisement for Kenco Coffee.

John Sullivan considered him for the role of Grandad in Only Fools and Horses, but decided against it as he thought Brambell was too closely associated with Steptoe. The role later went to Lennard Pearce whose character encompassed some of Steptoe's habits.

In 1982 he appeared in Terence Davies's film Death and Transfiguration, playing a dying elderly man who finally comes to terms with his homosexuality. His performance in this short film, a segment of The Terence Davies Trilogy (1983), won him critical acclaim. Brambell appears throughout the full 24-minute piece, but he does not speak a single word.

== Personal life ==
In 1982, Brambell appeared on BBC News paying tribute to Corbett, after the latter's death from a heart attack.

In 2002, Channel 4 broadcast a documentary film, When Steptoe Met Son, about the off-screen life of Brambell and his relationship with Corbett. The film claimed that the two men detested each other and were barely on speaking terms after the Australian tour. The claimed rift was supposedly caused in part by Brambell's alcoholism and supposedly evidenced by the pair leaving the country on separate planes. The claim was disputed by the writers of Steptoe and Son, Ray Galton and Alan Simpson, who rejected any hatred or conflict. Corbett's nephew released a statement in which he said that the actors did not hate each other: "We can categorically say they did not fall out. They were together for nearly a year in Australia, went on several sightseeing trips together, and left the tour at the end on different planes because Harry was going on holiday with his family, not because he refused to get on the same plane." They continued to work together after the Australian tour on radio and adverts, with it being generally accepted that the relationship between the two actors was under its greatest strain during the tour, though Brambell and Corbett soon settled their differences "fairly amicably", and in the spring of 1978 performed a short BBC radio sketch entitled Scotch on the Rocks.

Brambell was married to Mary Josephine Hall (known as "Molly") from 1948 to 1955. They divorced after she gave birth to their lodger's baby in 1955.

In 1962, Brambell was arrested and prosecuted for persistently importuning in a toilet in Shepherd's Bush, and was conditionally discharged. Decades after his death it was claimed that Brambell was homosexual but Brambell himself asserted "I'm not a homosexual ... The very thought disgusts me."

== Death ==
Brambell died of cancer at his home in Westminster, London, aged 72, on 18 January 1985. He was cremated on 25 January 1985 at Streatham Park Cemetery, where his ashes were scattered. Just six people attended his funeral: his brother, his partner Raymond, Ray Galton and Alan Simpson, Maureen Corbett, and a BBC representative.

== Legacy ==
The Curse of Steptoe, a BBC television play about Brambell and his co-star Harry H. Corbett, was broadcast on 19 March 2008 on digital BBC channel BBC Four, featuring Phil Davis as Brambell. The first broadcast gained the channel its highest audience figures to date, based on overnight returns.

== Film roles ==
Year	Title	Role	Notes
1947	Odd Man Out	Tram Passenger	
1947	Eyes That Kill	Newspaper Editor	
1947	Jassy	Servant	
1948	Another Shore	Arthur Moore	
1954	The Green Scarf	Court Clerk	
1956	Break-In	Army Cookhouse Sergeant	
1956	Dry Rot	Tar Man	
1957	The Story of Esther Costello	Man in Pub	
1958	The Salvage Gang	The Tramp	
1959	Serious Charge	Verger	
1959	Captured		
1960	Urge to Kill	Mr. Forsythe	
1961	Flame in the Streets	Mr. Palmer Senior	
1961	What a Whopper	Postman	
1961	The Sinister Man	Lock Keeper	
1962	The Boys	Robert Brewer Lavartory Attendant	
1962	In Search of the Castaways	Bill Gaye	
1963	The Small World of Sammy Lee	Harry	
1964	The Three Lives of Thomasina	Willie Bannock	
1964	Go Kart Go	Fred, Junkman	
1964	A Hard Day's Night	John McCartney (Paul's Grandfather)	
1964	Crooks in Cloisters		
1965	San Ferry Ann	Grandad	
1966	Where the Bullets Fly	Train Guard	
1966	Mano di velluto		
1968	Witchfinder General	Master Loach	As Wilfred [sic] Brambell
1968	Lionheart	Dignett	
1969	Giacomo Casanova: Childhood and Adolescence	Malipiero	
1969	Carry On Again Doctor	Mr. Pullen, a patient	
1969	Cry Wolf	Delivery Man	
1969	The Undertakers	Mr. Mortis	Short film
1970	Some Will, Some Won't	Henry Russell	
1971	To Catch a Spy	Beech	
1972	Steptoe and Son	Albert Steptoe	
1973	Steptoe and Son Ride Again	Albert Steptoe	
1973	Holiday on the Buses	Bert Thompson	
1979	The Adventures of Picasso	Alice B. Toklas	
1980	High Rise Donkey	Ben Foxcroft	
1982	The Island of Adventure	Uncle Jocelyn	
1983	The Terence Davies Trilogy	Robert Tucker (old age)	
1984	Sword of the Valiant	Porter	

== Television roles ==
Years	Title	Role	Notes
1947	The Cherry Orchard	Station Master	Live drama
1948	Happy as Larry	First Tailor	TV movie
1953	The Quatermass Experiment	A Drunk	Episode: "An Unidentified Species"
1954	Nineteen Eighty-Four	Thin Prisoner	
1955	Quatermass II	Tramp	Episode: "The Mark"
1957	The Adventures of Sir Lancelot	Fisherman	Episode: "The Lesser Breed"
1957	The Adventures of Robin Hood	Ned/Fisherman	2 episodes
1957	The Buccaneers	Old Man	Episode: "Spy Aboard"
1958	The Government Inspector	Postmaster Ivan Kuzmich Shpekin	Live drama
1958–1959	Our Mutual Friend	Mr. Dolls	
1959	Bleak House	Mr. Krook	3 episodes
1960	Maigret	Jacob	Episode: "A Man of Quality"
1961	Scotland Yard (film series)	Dr Stanton	Episode: "The Grand Junction Case"
1962–1965, 1970–1974	Steptoe and Son	Albert Steptoe	
1966	Alice in Wonderland	White Rabbit	TV play
1977	Just William	Mr. Buttermere	Episode: "A Little Interlude"
1978	All Creatures Great and Small	Dinsdale's Brother	Episode: "A Dog's Life"
1979	Citizen Smith	Jack	Episode: "Only Fools and Horses..."
1979	3-2-1 Dickens (Christmas Special)	Ebenezer Scrooge	(ser.2 ep. 11)
