= Steptoe and Son =

British TV sitcom (1962–1974)

- Corbett (left) and Brambell (right) as Harold and Albert
- Created by: Ray Galton and Alan Simpson
- Starring: Harry H. Corbett; Wilfrid Brambell
- Theme music composer: Ron Grainer
- Opening theme: "Old Ned"
- Country of origin: United Kingdom
- Original language: English
- No. of series: 8
- No. of episodes: 57 (list of episodes)

Production
- Running time: 30–45-minutes

Original release
- Network: BBC 1
- Release: 5 January 1962 – 26 December 1974

Related
- Steptoe and Son (1972); Steptoe and Son Ride Again (1973); When Steptoe Met Son (2002); The Curse of Steptoe (2008)

Steptoe and Son is a British sitcom written by Ray Galton and Alan Simpson about a father-and-son rag-and-bone business in 26a Oil Drum Lane, a fictional street in Shepherd's Bush, London. Four series were broadcast by the BBC in black and white from 1962 to 1965, followed by a second run, once again of four series, from 1970 to 1974 in colour. The lead roles were played by Wilfrid Brambell and Harry H. Corbett. The theme tune, "Old Ned", was composed by Ron Grainer. The series was voted 15th in a 2004 poll by the BBC to find Britain's Best Sitcom. It was remade in the United States as Sanford and Son, in Sweden as Albert & Herbert, in the Netherlands as Stiefbeen en zoon, in Portugal as Camilo & Filho, and in South Africa as Snetherswaite and Son. Two film adaptations of the series were released in cinemas, Steptoe and Son (1972) and Steptoe and Son Ride Again (1973).

The series focused on the inter-generational conflict of father and son. Albert Steptoe is an elderly rag-and-bone man, set in his grimy and grasping ways. By contrast, his son Harold is filled with social aspirations and pretensions. The show contained elements of drama and tragedy, such as how Harold was continually prevented from achieving his ambitions.

In 2000, the show was ranked number 44 on the 100 Greatest British Television Programmes compiled by the British Film Institute. In a 2001 Channel 4 poll Albert was ranked 39th on their list of the 100 Greatest TV Characters.

== Plot ==
Many episodes revolve around sometimes violent disagreements between the two men, Harold's attempts to bed women and momentary interest over things found on his round. Much of the humour derives from the pathos of the protagonists' situation, especially Harold's continually thwarted (usually by the elder Steptoe) attempts to better himself, and the unresolvable love/hate relationship that exists between the pair.

Albert almost always comes out on top, and routinely proves himself superior to his son whenever they compete, such as when they played snooker into the night and pouring rain in 1970, and Scrabble and badminton in the 1972 series. Harold takes these games extremely seriously and sees them as symbols of his desire to improve himself, but his efforts come to nothing each time. His father's success is partly down to greater skills but is aided by cynical gamesmanship and undermining of his son's confidence. In addition, Albert habitually has better judgement than his son, who blunders into multiple con tricks and blind alleys as a result of his unrealistic, desperate straw-clutching approach. Occasionally the tables are turned, but overall the old man is the winner.

Harold is infuriated by these persistent frustrations and defeats, even going to the extent in "Divided We Stand" (1972) of attempting to partition the house so that he does not have to share with his selfish, uncultured and negative father. His plan ends in failure and ultimately he can see no way out. However, for all the bitterness there is an essential bond between the pair. In bad situations, Harold sticks by his father, and Albert looks out for his son. This protective bond is shown in several episodes, such as "Full House" (1963) when Albert wins back Harold's money in a game of cards against Harold's manipulative group of friends, and "The Seven Steptoerai" (1974) when they are menaced by a local gangster running a protection racket and team up with some of Albert's friends to fight off the gangster's thugs.

The 1974 Christmas special ended the run and it first appears Harold is once again at the bad end of poor planning, when he books a Christmas holiday abroad, but then finds his passport is out of date. His father must go alone, and Harold, tearfully it seems, waves him off to enjoy a potential good time without him. Harold trudges away, only to jump in a car with a woman to drive off on his own holiday, revealing that he had engineered the whole situation from the beginning.

"Steptoe and Son" is the Steptoes' trading name, but as established in the first episode, the "Son" is not Harold as initially believed, but Albert. The name dates from when he and his mother (or father, depending on which storyline you believe) worked the rounds. The first series has the pair as very rough looking and often dirty and wearing ragged clothes, but they were portrayed as cleaner in later series.

== Characters ==
The two main characters in the show are Albert Steptoe (Wilfrid Brambell) and Harold Steptoe (Harry H. Corbett). They have a large extended family who appear occasionally including many of Albert's brothers and sisters, among them Auntie May (Rose Hill), Uncle Arthur (George A. Cooper) and Auntie Minnie (Mollie Sugden).

== Production ==
Development

The show had its roots in a 1962 episode of Galton & Simpson's Comedy Playhouse. Galton and Simpson's association with comedian Tony Hancock, for whom they had written Hancock's Half Hour, had ended and they had agreed to a proposal from the BBC to write a series of 10 comedy shows. The fourth in the series, "The Offer", was born both out of writer's block and budgetary constraints. Earlier shows in the series had cost more than expected, so the writers decided to write a two-hander set in one room. The idea of two brothers was considered but father and son worked best.

Galton and Simpson were not aiming to make a pilot for a series, having worked for seven years with Hancock. However, Tom Sloan, the BBC's head of comedy, told them during rehearsals that "The Offer" was a definite series pilot: he saw that the Steptoe idea had potential. Galton and Simpson were reportedly overwhelmed by this reaction, and the first of what became eight series was commissioned, the first four of which were transmitted between 1962 and 1965. The last four series were broadcast between 1970 and 1974, in colour. At the peak of the series' popularity, it received viewing figures of some 28,000,000 viewers per episode. In addition, the early 1970s saw two feature films and two 46-minute Christmas specials. In 2005, a play based on the series was released called Steptoe and Son in Murder at Oil Drum Lane, written by Ray Galton and John Antrobus.

Casting

Unlike other British TV series of the early 1960s, Steptoe and Son cast actors in its principal roles rather than comedians. Galton and Simpson had decided that they wanted to try to write for performers who "didn't count their laughs".

Both of the main actors used voices considerably different from their own. Brambell, despite being Irish, spoke with a received pronunciation English accent, as did the Manchester-raised Corbett. Brambell was aged 49 when he accepted the role of Albert, only 13 years older than Corbett. For his portrayal, he acquired a second set of "rotten" dentures to accentuate his character's poor attitude to hygiene.

Music

Ron Grainer won a second successive Ivor Novello award for the show's theme tune 'Old Ned', to which he gave a different treatment, one year later, during a Rag-and-Bone Man scene in The Home-Made Car. The series had no standard set of opening titles but the opening sequences would often feature the Steptoes' horse, Hercules.

Locations

Outside filming of the Steptoes' yard took place at a car-breakers' yard in Norland Gardens, London W11, then changing to Stable Way, Latimer Road, for the later series. Both sites have subsequently been redeveloped with no evidence now remaining of the entrance gates through which the horse and cart were frequently driven.

The pilot episode and the first four series, which aired in 1962–1965, were recorded in the BBC Lime Grove Studios in London. When the show returned in 1970 after a four-year hiatus, the programme was made in the BBC Television Centre studios in west London, as from 1970 the show was recorded in colour.

Notability

During its production in the 1960s and 1970s, Steptoe and Son marked itself out as radical compared to most UK sitcoms. This was an age when the predominant sources of laughter in British comedy were farce, coincidence, slapstick and innuendo. However Steptoe and Son brought greater social realism. Its characters were not only working class but demonstrably poor. The earthy language and slang used were in marked contrast to the refined voices heard on most television of the time: e.g., in "Back in Fashion", Harold warns Albert that when the models arrive, "if you feels like a D'Oyly Carte (rhyming slang for 'fart'), you goes outside." Social issues and debates were routinely portrayed, woven into the humour. The programme did not abandon the more traditional sources of comedy but used them in small doses. The characters, and their intense and difficult relationship, displayed deeper qualities of writing and performance than comedy fans were used to.

Adaptations

The British sitcom Steptoe and Son was adapted in the United States as Sanford and Son, which aired on NBC from 1972 to 1977.

== Episodes ==
Series	Episodes	Originally released	
Series	Episodes	First released	Last released
1	6	5 January 1962	12 July 1962
2	7	3 January 1963	14 February 1963
3	7	7 January 1964	18 February 1964
4	7	4 October 1965	15 November 1965
5	7	6 March 1970	17 April 1970
6	8	2 November 1970	21 December 1970
7	7	21 February 1972	3 April 1972
Special		24 December 1973	
8	6	4 September 1974	10 October 1974
Special		26 December 1974	

Steptoe and Son is rare among 1960s BBC television programmes, in that every episode has survived and exists in the BBC Archives, despite the mass wiping of many BBC archive holdings between 1967 and 1978. However, all the instalments from the first 1970 series and all but two from the second were originally made in colour and are only known to survive in the form of black and white domestic videotape recordings. Copies were made from the master tapes for the writers by an engineer at the BBC using a Shibaden SV-700 half-inch reel-to-reel video recorder—a forerunner of the video cassette recorder. In 2008, the first reel of a black and white telerecording of the Series 5 episode "A Winter's Tale" (lasting approximately 15 minutes) was returned to the BBC; this is the only telerecording of a colour Steptoe and Son episode known to still exist. Of the 30 episodes produced in colour, 17 exist in their original colour format.

The original 2" Quad videotapes of all the episodes of the original 1962–65 series were wiped in the late 1960s. However, these episodes mostly survive on film transfers of the original videotapes as 16mm black and white telerecordings. The exceptions to this are "The Stepmother", "The Wooden Overcoats", "The Lodger" and "My Old Man's a Tory", which exist as optical transfers made from domestic 405 line reel to reel videotapes obtained from writers Galton and Simpson.

The BBC has released 10 DVDs of the series—each of the eight series, and two compilations entitled "The Very Best of Steptoe and Son" volumes 1 and 2. Two Christmas specials are also available on DVD, as are two feature films: Steptoe and Son and Steptoe and Son Ride Again. A boxed set of Series 1–8 and the two Christmas specials was released on Region 2 DVD by 2entertain on 29 October 2007.

In addition, 52 episodes were remade for BBC Radio, initially on the Light Programme in 1966–67 and later Radio 2 from 1971 to 1976.

A special one-off remake of the "A Winter's Tale" episode aired on BBC Four on 14 September 2016, as part of the BBC's Lost Sitcom season recreating lost episodes of classic sitcoms.

== Sketch appearances ==
- In 1962, Brambell and Corbett appeared as Steptoe and Son in a short sketch written by Galton and Simpson on the BBC's annual Christmas Night with the Stars programme, broadcast on 25 December 1962. There are no known recordings.
- In 1963, they appeared on the ITV Royal Variety Performance in a sketch written by Galton and Simpson featuring Steptoe and Son totting outside Buckingham Palace, the telerecording of the live show, broadcast on 10 November 1963, still exists. The audio of the sketch was also released on a 7-inch single.
- On 31 December 1963 the BBC broadcast an edition of It's a Square World which featured a cameo by Wilfrid Brambell as Albert Steptoe witnessing the launch of BBC TV Centre into space. The sketch was included as an extra on the special edition DVD release of Doctor Who: The Aztecs
- In 1966, they appeared on the BBC series The Ken Dodd Show in another live on stage sketch written by Galton and Simpson featuring Steptoe and Son on Blackpool beach, with Ken Dodd in the last two minutes as a strange golf professional. A telerecording of the show, broadcast on 24 July 1966, survives.
- In 1967, they appeared in character in a short filmed sequence for the BBC's annual Christmas Night with the Stars programme. The black and white film sequence featuring Steptoe and Son, broadcast on 25 December 1967, still exists.
- In 1978, they recorded a Radio 2 sketch, referred to by fans as "Scotch on the Rocks", produced especially for a show titled Good Luck Scotland. This was again written by Galton and Simpson and had a basic premise of Albert wishing to go to Argentina to watch the Scottish football team play in the 1978 World Cup as the "Good Luck Scotland" title of the programme referred to Scotland's chances of winning the World Cup that year.

== Adverts ==
In 1977, Brambell and Corbett appeared in character for two television ads for Ajax cleaning products, recorded during their tour of Australia. In 1981, their final ever appearance together was in a UK advert for Kenco Coffee.

== In other media ==
Audio

A number of LPs and EPs featuring TV soundtracks have been released.

Books

To tie in with the original series, two novelisations were written by Gale Pedrick:

- Steptoe and Son. Hodder & Stoughton. 1964.
- Steptoe and Son at the Palace. Hodder & Stoughton. 1966.

In 2002, BBC Books published Steptoe and Son by Galton, Simpson and Ross, which comprehensively covered the television and radio series, films, Royal Variety Shows, commercials and the Sanford & Son spin-off.

== Other countries ==
- United States; in 1963 Jack Paar screened an episode of "Steptoe and Son" during one of his one-hour Friday night shows on NBC. Paar was an anglophile and frequently spotlighted British culture on his show. Later in 1963 he screened a film-clip of The Beatles, their first appearance on American TV. In 1965 Joseph E. Levine produced a pilot based on The Offer for the American market with Galton and Simpson. Starring Lee Tracy as Albert and Aldo Ray as Harold, it was unscreened, and did not lead to a series. The pilot was released on DVD in the UK in 2018. The concept was later re-worked as Sanford and Son, a top-rated series that ran for five years (1972–77) on the NBC network.
- Sweden; Sten-Åke Cederhök and Lennart Lundh (the six first episodes), succeeded by Tomas von Brömssen starred in Albert & Herbert. The pair lived at Skolgatan 15, an address in a working-class neighbourhood of Haga, Gothenburg.
- The Netherlands; Stiefbeen en Zoon ran for thirty-three episodes. It was awarded the 1964 Golden Televizier Ring.
- Norway; the 1975 Norwegian film, Skraphandlerne, starred Leif Juster and Tom Tellefsen. The names of the characters were Albert and Herbert, the names of the characters in the Swedish remake.
- Portugal; Camilo & Filho Lda., starring famous Portuguese comedian Camilo de Oliveira, with Nuno Melo as his son.
- South Africa; broadcast on the South African Broadcasting Corporation's commercial radio station Springbok Radio (now closed down) as "Snetherswaite and Son" in 1980. The run of 56 episodes was produced in Durban by veteran radio comedy producer Tom Meehan. It starred Tommy Read as Albert and Brian Squires as Harold. The name Steptoe was changed to Snetherswaite for the South African series, a recurring character Tommy Read played in the SABC version of "The Men from the Ministry" called Humbert Snetherswaite.

== Films ==
Steptoe and Son

In 1972, a film version was released of the show and proved highly popular. This first film, also called Steptoe and Son focuses on Harold getting married but still not being able to get away from his father.

Steptoe and Son Ride Again

Due to popular demand and the commercial success of the first film, another film, Steptoe and Son Ride Again, was released in 1973.

== Spin-offs ==
=== Television ===
==== When Steptoe Met Son ====
When Steptoe Met Son was a 2002 Channel 4 documentary about the personal lives of Wilfrid Brambell and Harry H. Corbett. It aired on 20 August 2002.

The programme reveals how Brambell and Corbett were highly dissimilar to their on-screen characters. Corbett felt he had a promising career as a serious actor, but was trapped by his role as Harold and forced to keep returning to the series after typecasting limited his choice of work. Brambell, meanwhile, was gay, something that in the 1960s was still frowned upon and thus driven underground. Homosexual acts were not decriminalised until the Sexual Offences Act 1967. The documentary went on to describe an ill-fated final tour of Australia, during which the already strained relationship between Corbett and Brambell finally broke down for good.

==== The Curse of Steptoe ====
The Curse of Steptoe is a television play which was first broadcast on 19 March 2008 on BBC Four as part of a season of dramas about television personalities. It stars Jason Isaacs as Harry H. Corbett and Phil Davis as Wilfrid Brambell. The drama is based upon the actors' on-and-off-screen relationship during the making of the BBC sitcom Steptoe and Son, and is based on interviews with colleagues, friends and family of the actors, and the Steptoe writers, Ray Galton and Alan Simpson.

The screenplay was written by Brian Fillis, also responsible for the similarly themed 2006 drama Fear of Fanny, which is about television personality Fanny Cradock off-screen. The 66-minute film is directed by Michael Samuels and produced by Ben Bickerton.

Both When Steptoe Met Son and The Curse of Steptoe were considered inaccurate by writers Galton and Simpson and Corbett's family.

=== Theatre ===
==== Steptoe and Son in Murder at Oil Drum Lane ====
In October 2005, Ray Galton and John Antrobus premiered their play, Steptoe and Son in Murder at Oil Drum Lane, at the Theatre Royal, York. It then went on tour across the country. It was set in the present day and related the events leading to Harold killing his father and their eventual meeting 30 years later, Albert then appearing as a ghost.

It was not the first time this idea had been considered. When Wilfrid Brambell left the UK after the third series to pursue an eventually unsuccessful Broadway musical career, Galton and Simpson toyed with the concept of 'killing off' Albert in order to continue the show without having to await Brambell's return. The character would have been replaced with Harold's illegitimate son, Arthur (a part thought to be intended for actor David Hemmings). This idea was detested by Corbett, who thought it ridiculous, although the 2008 drama The Curse of Steptoe depicts Corbett as being delighted with the concept, since assuming the role of father would allow Harold's character some development and growth, which he felt was long overdue.

==== Steptoe and Son ====
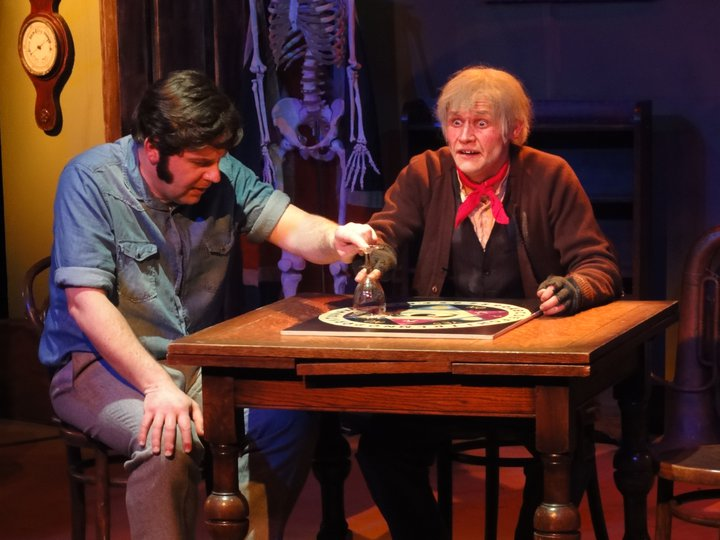
Jack Lane and Michael Simmonds as the duo

In March 2011, the Engine Shed Theatre Company performed three episodes of the series live on stage at the Capitol Theatre, Horsham. Jack Lane played Albert Steptoe and Michael Simmonds played Harold. The three episodes performed by the company were: Men of Letters, Robbery with Violence and Seance in a Wet Rag and Bone Yard. Engine Shed went on to adapt and perform the two Christmas Specials later that year.

Many of the original TV episodes of Steptoe and Son have now been officially adapted to the stage by the original writers Ray Galton and Alan Simpson, with David Pibworth.

Steptoe and Son by Hambledon Productions

Between 2017–2022, theatre company Hambledon Productions produced four consecutive tours, based on the original Galton and Simpson scripts. These included Steptoe and Son (2017–2018, featuring the episodes: Come Dancing, Men of Letters and Divided We Stand), Christmas with Steptoe and Son (2018–2019, featuring the episodes: The Party, The Bath and A Perfect Christmas), Steptoe and Son Radio Show: Christmas Edition (2021, a radio play based on the previous tour) and The Steptoe and Son Radio Show (2022) featuring the episodes Is That Your Horse Outside?, Upstairs, Downstairs, Upstairs, Downstairs and A Death in the Family. This recent tour was co-produced with Apollo Theatre Company. Across all these productions, John Hewer played Harold Steptoe and Jeremy Smith played Albert Steptoe.

==== Steptoe and Son by Kneehigh ====
Performed in 2012 and 2013 by Kneehigh Theatre, Steptoe and Son was adapted from four of the show's original scripts. The production was designed to highlight the Beckettian nature of Albert and Harold's situation, focusing on themes of over-reliance and being trapped within social class. The production toured the UK and received positive reviews from the Financial Times and three stars from The Guardian's Lynn Gardner.

== Home media ==
=== DVD releases ===
Series	Release date		No. of discs	Features
Series	Region 2	Region 4	No. of discs	Features
Series 1	13 September 2004	10 November 2004	1	Includes Pilot
Series 2	8 August 2005	2 March 2006	1	—N/a
Series 3	13 February 2006	6 July 2006	1	—N/a
Series 4	15 May 2006	6 July 2006	2	—N/a
Series 5	24 July 2006	1 August 2007	2	—N/a
Series 6	8 January 2007	5 March 2008	2	—N/a
Series 7	26 March 2007	7 August 2008	2	—N/a
Series 8	14 May 2007	5 March 2009	1	—N/a
Christmas Specials	29 October 2007	6 November 2008	1	Includes Pilot, 1973 & 1974 specials
Series 1–8	29 October 2007	1 October 2009	13	Includes Pilot, 1973 & 1974 specials
Series 1–8 (HMV Exclusive)	22 October 2018	—N/a	13	Includes Pilot, 1973 & 1974 specials

== See also ==
- British sitcom
- List of films based on British sitcoms
