= Steptoe and Son in Murder at Oil Drum Lane =

Play written by Ray Galton and John Antrobus

The poster advertising the play.

Steptoe and Son in Murder at Oil Drum Lane is a play written by Ray Galton and John Antrobus based on the Steptoe and Son series. It was first performed in 2005.

The title of this play was inspired by the Swedish 1982 play Albert & Herbert: Mordet på Skolgatan 15 (meaning Albert & Herbert: The Murder at Skolgatan 15) by Sten-Åke Cederhök, in which the title refers to their home in Haga, Gothenburg and their names as in the Swedish spin-off television series.

== Background ==
Steptoe and Son had been a successful British sitcom in the 1960s and 1970s. Ray Galton had been one of the two writers of the original series, and he co-wrote this play. It provides an alternative ending to the original series, explaining the two protagonists' lives together and their deaths.

== Plot ==
The year is 2005. Steptoe's old house is now the property of the National Trust. Harold Steptoe, now in his 70s, visits the place, but gets shut in after closing time. Through his monologue, the audience discovers that he accidentally killed his father. Since then, he has been living in secret in Rio de Janeiro.

While pondering his old home, the ghost of his father, Albert, reappears. Albert explains that he has been trapped in this house with the "poncy" National Trust man, and that the only thing that Albert needs to get into heaven is an apology from Harold. Harold refuses to give it, though, because he blames Albert for ruining his life.

Most of the story is told in flashback. Albert stopped him from going to school, so missing out on an education. Albert got Harold to take the blame for looting in the Blitz. Albert stopped him from going to the D-Day landings by locking him in a secret compartment throughout the war. When the war ends, Harold is arrested and sent to fight in the Malayas. When he returns, Albert continues to interfere in his life. In an attempt to be rid of Albert forever, Harold plans to emigrate to New Zealand with his fiancée, Joyce. Albert ruins it by telling them that Joyce is secretly Harold's sister. Harold still sets off for New Zealand, but Albert gets him arrested by framing him as a thief. When Harold gets out of jail, Albert thwarts all his attempts to get a girlfriend. Harold continues to be mad at Albert until he discovers that in all the junk, he has a copy of the Gutenberg Bible, worth £3 million. Harold is over the moon and runs off to celebrate. Albert is not so happy, realising that his simple life with Harold will be over. Harold returns home to find the Bible missing, and, presuming his father has destroyed it, he throws a spear at the toilet door in a fit of rage. At that precise moment, Albert opens the door and is stabbed by the spear.

The flashbacks end. Harold now finds it in his heart to forgive Albert. Then he has a fatal heart attack, after finding out that the Bible was hidden for safe measure, not destroyed, although over time it had been chewed and ripped. He becomes a ghost along with Albert. The next morning, his body is discovered, and Joyce, who has become a nun, asks for him to be buried next to his father, much to Harold's annoyance. When Albert accidentally reveals to Harold that Joyce and he are not really related, Harold is furious, and they fly off into the sky on their old wagon, pulled by their old horse Hercules, arguing over which one will get into Heaven.

== Actors ==
- Harold – Jake Nightingale
- Albert – Harry Dickman
- National Trust Man, Policeman No. 1, Military Policeman – Daniel Beales
- Pamela Joyce – Alyson Coote
- Fiona – Louise Metcalfe
- Policeman No. 2 – Andy Clarkson

== Production credits ==
- Director – Roger Smith
- Designer – Nigel Hook
- Lighting designer – Tony Simpson
- Composer – Christopher Madin
- Sound designer – Clement Rawling
- General manager – Armand Gerrard
- Production manager – Dominic Fraser
