= Harry H. Corbett =

English actor (1925–1982)

Harry H. Corbett OBE
- Publicity photo of Corbett in the 1970s
- Born: 28 February 1925; Rangoon, British Burma
- Died: 21 March 1982 (aged 57); Hastings, East Sussex, England
- Occupation: Actor
- Years active: 1945–1982
- Notable work: See below
- Television: Steptoe and Son
- Spouses: Sheila Steafel (m. 1958; div. 1964) Maureen Blott (m. 1969)
- Children: 2, including Susannah Corbett

Harry H. Corbett (28 February 1925 – 21 March 1982) was an English actor. He is best remembered for playing rag-and-bone man Harold Steptoe alongside Wilfrid Brambell in the long-running BBC Television sitcom Steptoe and Son (1962–1965, 1970–1974). His success on television led to appearances in comedy films including The Bargee (1964), Carry On Screaming! (1966) and Jabberwocky (1977).

== Early life ==
Corbett was born on 28 February 1925, the youngest of seven children, in Rangoon, Burma, (now Myanmar) where his father, George Corbett, was serving as a company quartermaster sergeant in the South Staffordshire Regiment of the British Army, stationed at a cantonment as part of the Colonial defence forces. Corbett was sent to Britain after his mother, Caroline Emily, née Barnsley, died of dysentery when he was eighteen months old. He was then brought up by his aunt Annie Williams, in Earl Street, Ardwick, Manchester, and later on a new council estate in Wythenshawe. He attended Ross Place and Benchill primary schools; although he passed the scholarship exam for entry to Chorlton Grammar School, he was not able to take up his place there and instead attended Sharston secondary school.

Corbett enlisted in the Royal Marines during the Second World War, and served in the Home Fleet on the heavy cruiser HMS Devonshire. After VJ Day in 1945 he was posted to the Far East, where he was involved in quelling unrest in New Guinea and reportedly killed two Japanese soldiers in hand-to-hand fighting. He was then posted to Tonga, but deserted and remained in Australia before handing himself in to the Military Police. His military service left him with a damaged bladder following an infection, and a red mark on his eye caused by a thorn, which was not treated until late in his life.

== Career ==
Upon returning to civilian life, Corbett trained as a radiographer before taking up acting as a career, joining the Chorlton Repertory theatre. In the early 1950s, he added the initial "H" to avoid confusion with the television entertainer Harry Corbett, known for his act with the glove-puppet Sooty. He joked that "H" stood for "hennyfink", a Cockney pronunciation of "anything". In 1956, he appeared on stage in The Family Reunion at the Phoenix Theatre in London.

From 1958, Corbett began to appear regularly in films, including Floods of Fear (1958), filmed at Pinewood, coming to public attention as a serious, intense performer, in contrast to his later reputation in sitcom. He appeared in television dramas such as The Adventures of Robin Hood (as four characters in episodes between 1957 and 1960) and Police Surgeon (1960). He also worked and studied Stanislavski's system at Joan Littlewood's Theatre Workshop at the Theatre Royal in Stratford, London.

In 1962, scriptwriters Galton and Simpson, who had been successful with Hancock's Half Hour, invited Corbett to appear in "The Offer", an episode of the BBC's anthology series of one-off comedy plays, Comedy Playhouse, written by Galton and Simpson. He played Harold Steptoe, a rag-and-bone man who lives with his irascible widower father, Albert (Wilfrid Brambell) in a dilapidated house attached to their junkyard and stable for their cart horse, Hercules. At the time, Corbett was working at the Bristol Old Vic, where he appeared as Macbeth.

The programme was a success and a full series followed later that same year, continuing, with breaks, until 1974, when the Christmas special became the final episode. Although the popularity of Steptoe and Son made Corbett a star, it damaged his serious acting career, as he became irreversibly associated with Steptoe in the public eye. As a result, severe typecasting forced him to return to the role of Harold Steptoe over and over. Before the series began, Corbett had played Shakespeare's Richard II to great acclaim; however, when he played Hamlet in 1970, he felt both critics and audiences alike were not taking him seriously and could only see him as Steptoe. Corbett found himself receiving offers only for bawdy comedies or loose parodies of Steptoe.

In 1967, he was interviewed by Clive Goodwin, for an episode of a BBC series in which "leading young actors discussed their start in the profession, the parts that brought them success and their views on acting."

Production of the sitcom was stressful in the last few years, as Brambell was an alcoholic, often ill-prepared for rehearsals and forgetting his lines and movements. A tour of a Steptoe and Son stage production in Australia and New Zealand in 1977 proved a disaster due to Brambell's drinking.

The television episodes were remade for radio, often with the original cast; it is these that were made available on cassette and CD. After the series of Steptoe and Son had officially finished, Corbett and Brambell played the characters again on radio (in a newly written sketch to tie in with the Scottish team's participation in the 1978 World Cup), as well as in a television commercial for Kenco coffee. The two men reunited in January 1981 for one final performance as Steptoe and Son in a further commercial for Kenco.

=== Other work ===
The success of Steptoe and Son led to roles for Corbett on the big screen as James Ryder in Ladies Who Do (1963), Hemel Pike (one of two boatmen, the other being Ronnie Barker) in The Bargee (1964) written by Galton and Simpson, Detective Sergeant Sidney Bung in Carry On Screaming! (1966) and Ambrose Twombly in the "Lust" segment of The Magnificent Seven Deadly Sins (1971). There were two Steptoe and Son feature length films made: Steptoe and Son (1972) and Steptoe and Son Ride Again (1973) in which he starred, of course, as Harold. He also appeared in a Children's Foundation short The Chiffy Kids (1976), as Hungry Herbert, then landed minor roles in the David Essex film Silver Dream Racer (1980), Terry Gilliam's Jabberwocky (1977) and Hardcore (1977).

On the small screen, Corbett appeared as a narrator in four episodes of the BBC children's television series Jackanory during 1966. He also had the leading roles in two ITV television programmes, Mr. Aitch (1967) written especially for him, in which he portrayed 'a bowler-hatted, cigar-smoking well-to-do wheeler and dealer' and Grundy (1980) as a puritanical newsagent. In addition, he had a supporting role in BBC's Potter (1980) with Arthur Lowe.

Corbett recorded multiple 45 rpm records, most of which were novelty songs based upon the rag-and-bone character, including "Harry, You Love Her" and "Junk Shop". He recorded a number of sea shanties and folk songs. In 1973, he recorded an album titled Only Authorised Employees To Break Bottles which was a "showcase of accents", with songs from Corbett in a range of accents, including Liverpudlian, Brummie and Mancunian; the title echoes a notice which is visible in the bottle-smashing scene in the film 'The Bargee'. The album was recorded in 1973 and released in 1974 on the Torquay, Devon-based RA record label with support from seventies folk band 'Faraway Folk'. Including the titles on this album, he released over 30 songs.

== Personal life ==
Corbett married twice, first to the actress Sheila Steafel (from 1958 to 1964), and then to actress Maureen Blott (stage name Crombie) (from 1969 until his death in 1982), with whom he had two children, including Susannah who has written a biography of her father, Harry H. Corbett: The Front Legs of the Cow, in March 2012.

=== Political views ===
Corbett was a Labour Party campaigner, and once appeared in a party political broadcast, and was a guest of Prime Minister Harold Wilson. The television character Harold Steptoe appears as the Labour Party secretary for Shepherd's Bush West in the sixth series episode, "Tea for Two". In 1969, Corbett also appeared as Harold Steptoe in a Labour Party political broadcast, where Bob Mellish had to argue against Steptoe's accusation that all parties are the same.

As Prime Minister, Wilson wished to have Corbett appointed an Officer of the Order of the British Empire (OBE). Corbett was included, along with the Sooty puppeteer Harry Corbett, in the 1976 New Year Honours.

=== Health problems and death ===
A heavy smoker all his adult life, Corbett had his first heart attack in September 1979. According to his daughter, Susannah, he smoked 60 cigarettes a day until the heart attack, after which he cut down to 20. He appeared in pantomime at the Churchill Theatre, Bromley, within two days of leaving hospital. He was then badly hurt in a car accident. The injuries to his face were obvious when he appeared shortly afterwards in the BBC detective series Shoestring. Other work included the film Silver Dream Racer, with David Essex, and a Thames Television/ITV comedy series Grundy, both in 1980. In the latter, Corbett played an old man discovering the permissive society after a lifetime of clean living.

Corbett's final role was an episode of the Anglia Television/ITV series Tales of the Unexpected, entitled "The Moles". Filmed shortly before his death, it was broadcast two months later, in May 1982.

Having appeared in several films and TV shows after production of Steptoe ended, Corbett finally seemed to be overcoming the typecasting that affected much of his career when he died of a heart attack on 21 March 1982, in Hastings, East Sussex. He was 57 years old.

Wilfrid Brambell appeared on BBC News paying tribute to Corbett; "A nice guy, and we did work well together, despite the fact that we only met when we were working because we live different lives and miles apart. I, as you know, have a two-room flat; he had a large farm with a wife, two kids, dogs, cats and a mother-in-law".

He is buried in the graveyard at St Michael the Archangel church at Penhurst, East Sussex. The headstone inscription, chosen by his wife Maureen, reads "The earth can have but earth, which is his due: My spirit is thine, the better part of me", from William Shakespeare's Sonnet 74. Maureen was buried alongside him in 1999.

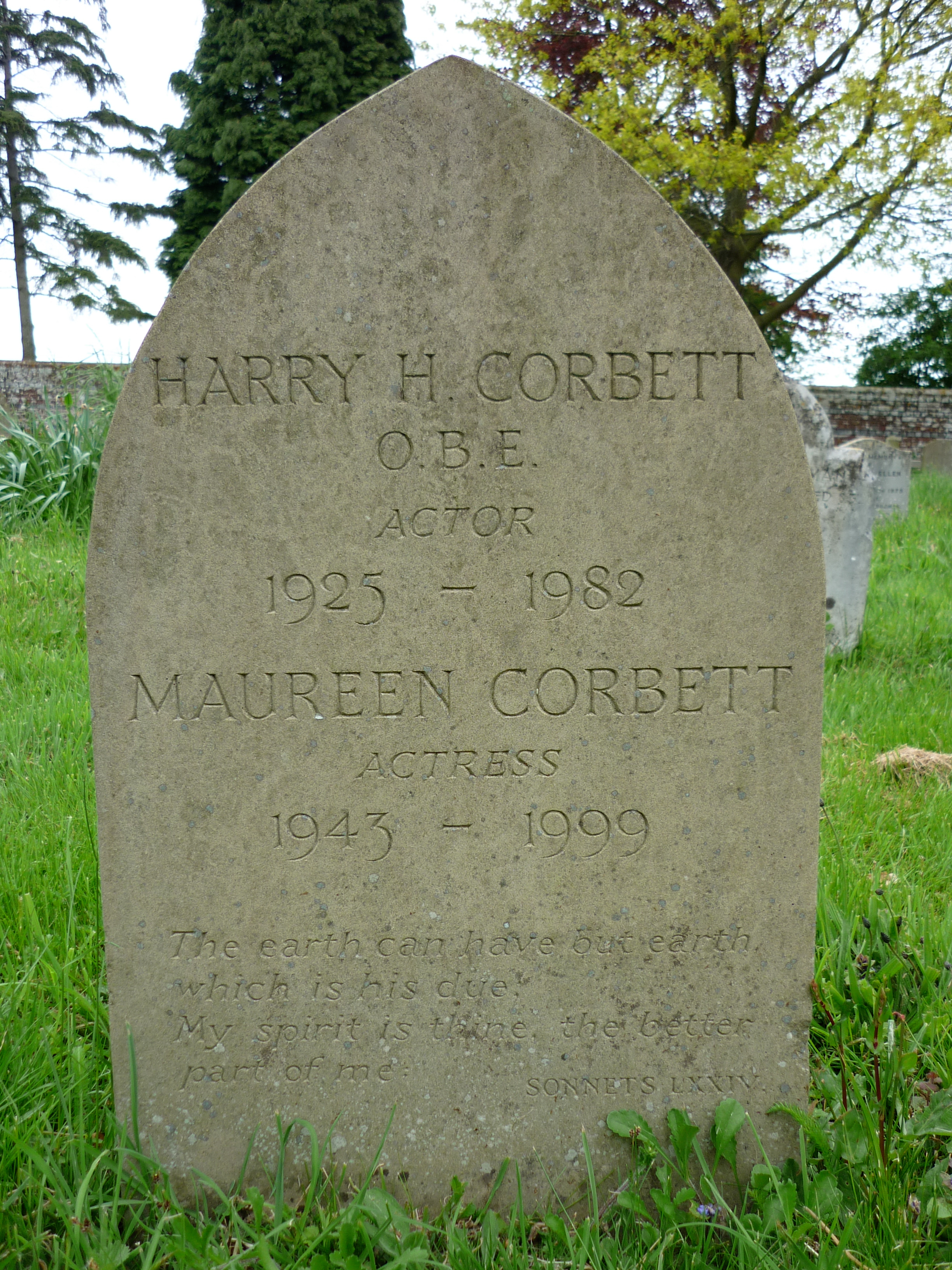
Headstone of Harry H and Maureen Corbett, Church of St. Michael the Archangel, Penhurst, East Sussex

Corbett is commemorated in the name of the Corbett Theatre at the East 15 Acting School at Loughton.

== Filmography ==
- Never Look Back (1952) – Policeman in charge of the cells (uncredited)
- The Passing Stranger (1954) – (uncredited)
- Floods of Fear (1958) – Sharkey
- Nowhere to Go (1958) – Sullivan (as Harry Corbett)
- Shake Hands with the Devil (1959) – Clancy (as Harry Corbett)
- In the Wake of a Stranger (1959) – McCabe
- Cover Girl Killer (1959) – The Man
- The Shakedown (1960) – Gollar
- Marriage of Convenience (1960) – Inspector Bruce
- The Big Day (1960) – Harry Jackson
- The Unstoppable Man (1960) – Feist
- Scotland Yard, "Wings of Death" (1961) – Superintendent Hammond
- The Edgar Wallace Mystery Theatre (1960–62) – "Marriage of Convenience" (1960), Inspector Bruce; "Time to Remember" (1962), Jack Burgess
- Some People (1962) – Johnnie's Father
- Sparrows Can't Sing (1963) – Greengrocer (uncredited)
- Sammy Going South a.k.a. A Boy Ten Feet Tall (1963) – Lem
- Ladies Who Do (1963) – James Ryder
- What a Crazy World (1963) – Sam Hitchens
- Bomb Disposal (1963) – Mad Bomber (uncredited) (short)
- The Bargee (1964) – Hemel Pike
- Rattle of a Simple Man (1964) – Percy Winthram
- Joey Boy (1965) – Joey Boy Thompson
- The Sandwich Man (1966) – Mack, Stage Door Keeper
- Carry On Screaming! (1966) – Detective Sergeant Sidney Bung
- Crooks and Coronets a.k.a. Sophie's Place (1969) – Frank Finley
- The Magnificent Seven Deadly Sins (1971) – Ambrose (segment "Lust")
- Steptoe and Son (1972) – Harold Albert Kitchener Steptoe
- Steptoe and Son Ride Again (1973) – Harold Albert Kitchener Steptoe
- Percy's Progress a.k.a. It's Not the Size that Counts (1974) – Prime Minister
- Hardcore a.k.a. Fiona (1977) – Art
- Adventures of a Private Eye (1977) – Sydney
- Jabberwocky (1977) – The Squire
- What's Up Superdoc! (1978) – Goodwin
- The Plank (1979) – Amorous Van Driver
- Silver Dream Racer (1980) – Wiggins

== Television roles ==
Year	Title	Role	Notes
1955	The Girl	Tony	As Harry Corbett
1956	New Ramps for Old	Kegworthy	As Harry Corbett
1956–1958	ITV Play of the Week	Various	5 episodes
1957	Theatre Night	Jules Palotin	Episode: Nekrassov,
1957–1960	The Adventures of Robin Hood	Various	4 episodes
1957–1968	Armchair Theatre	Various	13 episodes
1959	The Torrents of Spring	Sonny	
1960	Song in a Strange Land	Ricardo Tancredo	
1960	Police Surgeon	George Drake	Episode: "Lag on the Run"
1960–1961	Deadline Midnight	Harry Armitage/Harry Briggs	2 episodes
1961	Theatre 70, ATV	Various	3 episodes
1961	Tales of Mystery	Milligan	Episode: "The Man Who Was Milligan"
1962–1975	Comedy Playhouse	Various	Three episodes
1962	Studio 4	The Landlord	Episode: "A Voice from the Top"
1962	Christmas Night with the Stars	Harold Steptoe	
1962–1965 1970–1974	Steptoe and Son	Harold Steptoe	
1963	Zero One	Vladimir Petrovsky	Episode: "Discord"
1966	Jackanory	Storyteller	Various
1966	The Ken Dodd Show	Harold Steptoe	
1967	Mr Aitch	Harry Aitch	14 episodes
1967	Christmas Night with the Stars	Harold Steptoe	
1968	Theatre 625	Jake Whittington	Episode: "The Fall of Kelvin Walker"
1968	City '68	Jigger Barrett	Episode: "The System: The House That Jigger Built"
1969	Galton and Simpson Comedy	Basil Puddifoot	Episode: "Never Talk to Strangers"
1969–1970	The Best Things in Life	Alfred Wilcox	
1971	The Des O'Connor Show	Self	
1973	The Bruce Forsyth Show	Self	
1973	The Goodies	Minister for Health	Episode: "Hospital for Hire"
1974	Whodunnit?	panelist	Episode: "It's Quicker By Train"
1976	The Chiffy Kids,	Hungry Herbert	Episode: "Pot Luck"
1977	Premiere	Alan Glut	Episode: "A Hymn from Jim"
1979	Shoestring	Tom	Episode: "Nine Tenths of the Law"
1980	Potter	Harry Tooms	3 episodes
1980	Grundy	Leonard Grundy	
1980	The Dick Emery Christmas Show: For Whom the Jingle Bells Toll	Nico	
1980	Comedy Tonight		
1981	Nice to See You,		
1982	Tales of the Unexpected	George Balsam	

== Radio ==
Corbett made few solo radio appearances. The following are sourced from the BBC Archive.

- Comedy Parade, "The Kerbstone Twist Show", BBC Light Programme (1964) – Wingate Gibbon
- Sounds Familiar, BBC Light Programme (1967) – panellist
- Waggoners' Walk, BBC Radio 2 (1975) – self, with Wilfrid Brambell
- Just Before Midnight, "Play Soft Then Attack", BBC Radio 4 (1978) – Alf

== Discography ==
This list does not include any of the spoken-word recordings of Steptoe and Son.

Year	Title	Format	Label	Notes	Ref
1955	The Singing Sailor	Vinyl, LP	Topic Records TRL3	Credited to: Ewan MacColl, A. L. Lloyd, Harry H. Corbett	
1962	Junk Shop / The Isle of Clerkenwell	Vinyl, 7-inch single	Pye Records 7N.15468		
1963	Like The Big Guys Do / The Green Eye of the Little Yellow God	Vinyl, 7-inch single	Pye Records 7N.15552		
1963	The Table And The Chair / Things We Never Had	Vinyl, 7-inch single	Pye Records 7N.15584		
1967	Blow The Man Down	Vinyl, 7-inch single	Topic Records TOP98	Credited to: Ewan MacColl, A. L. Lloyd, Harry H. Corbett, reissue from 1955	
1967	Flower Power Fred / (I'm) Saving All My Love	Vinyl, 7-inch single	Decca F 12714	Credited to: Harry H. Corbett with The Unidentified Flower Objects	
1971	Harry You Love Her / It's The End Of A Beautiful Day	Vinyl, 7-inch single	Columbia DB 8841		
1974	Only Authorised Employees To Break Bottles	Vinyl, 7-inch single	RA Records RALP 6022		
1974	Shetland Oil / Your Baby Has Gone Down The Plug Hole	Vinyl, 7-inch single	Grampian Records Ltd. NAN 1035		
1979	An Old Fashioned Christmas / Especially When You're Young	Vinyl, 7-inch single	Symbol Records S 001	Credited to: Harry H. & The Kids	
