= Steptoe and Son (film) =

1972 British comedy film by Cliff Owen

- Film poster by Arnaldo Putzu
- Directed by: Cliff Owen
- Written by: Ray Galton; Alan Simpson
- Produced by: Aida Young
- Starring: Wilfrid Brambell; Harry H. Corbett; Carolyn Seymour
- Cinematography: John Wilcox
- Edited by: Bernard Gribble
- Music by: Roy Budd; Jack Fishman; Ron Grainer
- Production company: EMI Films
- Distributed by: MGM-EMI Film Distributors
- Release date: 23 March 1972
- Running time: 98 minutes
- Country: United Kingdom
- Language: English
- Budget: £100,000 or £178,000
- Box office: £500,000

Steptoe and Son (also known as Steptoe & Son) is a 1972 British comedy drama film directed by Cliff Owen and starring Wilfrid Brambell and Harry H. Corbett. It was written by Ray Galton and Alan Simpson. The film centres on a flashback to about four years earlier detailing Harold's short-lived marriage to Zita, a stripper.

The film was a spin-off from the BBC television comedy series of the same name (1962–1974) about father-and-son rag-and-bone merchants. A sequel, Steptoe and Son Ride Again, was released in 1973.

== Plot ==
Harold and Albert leave the divorce court, and while on the road home they discuss Harold's failed marriage, beginning the flashback to about four years ago.

During a stag do at a local football club, Harold meets one of the acts, a stripper called Zita. After a whirlwind romance, the couple are married, although the actual wedding ceremony is delayed when Albert, acting as best man, loses the ring somewhere in the yard. They eventually find it in a pile of horse manure, and since they have no time to clean up, the smell of the manure on their clothes has noses twitching in church.

Harold and Zita fly to Spain for their honeymoon, but Albert refuses to be left behind. His constant presence begins to drive a wedge between Harold and Zita. When they are finally alone and begin to consummate their marriage, they are interrupted by Albert's cries of distress from the adjoining room, and discover that he has contracted food poisoning from some of the local cuisine.

The only available flight back home at short notice has only two seats, and Harold feels obliged to fly home with Albert, leaving Zita in Spain to follow as soon as possible. Back home, Albert quickly recovers, while Harold frets over Zita not writing. When he finally receives delayed postcards and a letter from her, she tells him she has decided their marriage cannot work and has taken up with a British holiday rep at the hotel where they were staying. Harold is heartbroken, and, despite his earlier scheming to get rid of Zita, Albert is sympathetic.

Some months later, Harold tracks down Zita and finds that she is pregnant, and when he assumes he is the father she does not disabuse him. Harold offers to take care of them both and persuades Zita to go with him, but on returning home Albert makes it clear that he does not like her and she flees. A short while later, the two men find a baby in the horse's stable. Harold assumes that the child is Zita's, and, with Albert's help, takes on its rearing. On the way to the christening, they argue over what name to give the baby, with Albert insisting he be named Albert Winston (after himself and former UK prime minister Winston Churchill), while Harold rebuffs this, suggesting Old English names, but he struggles to decide, so he requests it be named after the vicar. Unbeknownst to Harold, the vicar's name is Albert. As such, Harold names him Albert Jeremy, but always refers to him as Jeremy.

Returning from work one day, Harold finds the baby has been taken from his pram while Albert was asleep. An unsigned note left in the pram convinces Harold it is from Zita wanting the child back. Searching for her, Harold comes across her stripping in a local rugby club where she is grabbed by some of the rugby players. Attempting to save her, Harold is beaten up by the rugby players and is only rescued when Zita and her musician save him by taking him into her dressing room. Harold hears a baby's cries but, when he pulls back a curtain, he finds a mixed-race baby. It turns out that Zita and her musician, who is black, are a couple. Harold then realises that "Jeremy" was not Zita's baby and was not his child.

The flashback ends and again shows Harold and Albert riding home in their horse and cart. Harold laments that he "must be the only bloke who lost two kids in one day". They then both give V sign to a Rolls-Royce honking behind them, and after the car passes it is revealed that the passenger is a royal high-ranking naval officer, implied to be Prince Philip, Duke of Edinburgh (who gives them the V sign in return). The credits roll as they ride on The Mall.

== Cast ==
- Wilfrid Brambell as Albert Steptoe
- Harry H. Corbett as Harold Steptoe
- Carolyn Seymour as Zita Steptoe
- Arthur Howard as vicar
- Victor Maddern as chauffeur
- Fred Griffiths as barman
- Joan Heath as Zita's mother
- Fred McNaughton as Zita's father
- Lon Satton as pianist
- Patrick Fyffe as Arthur (as Perri St. Claire)
- Patsy Smart as Mrs Hobbs
- Mike Reid as compere
- Alec Mango as hotel doctor
- Michael Da Costa as hotel manager
- Enys Box as traffic warden
- Barrie Ingham as Terry
- Gary Wraight as Baby Albert Jeremy

== Production ==
The film had investment from the Robert Stigwood Organisation. It was mostly financed by EMI Films under Nat Cohen.

== Reception ==
=== Critical ===
The Monthly Film Bulletin wrote:

The best of the Steptoe episodes on television owed their appeal to a delicate balance between pathos and farce. In the enclosed world of the junk yard and the shabby house, Galton and Simpson created in miniature a tragi-comic family situation which was universally recognisable. The old man's emotional blackmail and Harold's guilty love-hate for him bound them into a helpless, unbreakable relationship which was nevertheless capable of enough variations to provide a series of short and shapely anecdotes. The ingredients of the film version are exactly the same and the plot lines are entirely predictable, but the mere scale of the larger screen has spoiled the intimacy of the scene and coarsened the characterisations. Harold suffers least – he is still the incorrigibly hopeful innocent, though we get very little chance to observe him against his natural background in the junk trade. But Wilfrid Brambell tends to overplay Albert, emphasising the old man's spitefulness at the expense of his genuine affection for Harold and largely losing the effect of his most maddening characteristic, that worldly wisdom which despite its limitations is still so much greater than Harold's and which puts him at a permanent advantage. ... One suspects that the BBC Steptoe is very much an ensemble affair and that it is the absence of the familiar production team that has taken the edge off both writing and performance. Even so, the film is a lively enough piece of entertainment, albeit no match for the best Steptoe episodes of 1962.

The Radio Times Guide to Films gave the film 3/5 stars, writing: "This is one of the better sitcom spin-offs, with Ray Galton and Alan Simpson contributing a script that not only has a half-decent story, but also gags that would not have disgraced the original TV series. Wilfrid Brambell and Harry H. Corbett reprise their roles to good effect, along with Carolyn Seymour, Corbett's new stripper-bride, whose mercenary intentions threaten the future of the rag-and-bone yard."

Leslie Halliwell said: "Strained attempt to transfer the TV rag-and-bone comedy (which in the US became Sanford and Son) to the big screen. Not the same thing at all. "

=== Box office ===
The film was a success at the box office and made a profit of five times its cost.
