= Steptoe and Son Ride Again =

1973 British comedy film by Peter Sykes

- Directed by: Peter Sykes
- Written by: Ray Galton; Alan Simpson
- Produced by: Aida Young
- Starring: Wilfrid Brambell; Harry H. Corbett; Diana Dors; Milo O'Shea
- Cinematography: John Wilcox
- Edited by: Bernard Gribble
- Music by: Roy Budd; Jack Fishman; Ron Grainer
- Production company: Associated London Films
- Distributed by: Anglo–EMI
- Release date: 6 July 1973
- Running time: 99 minutes
- Country: United Kingdom
- Language: English

Steptoe and Son Ride Again (also known as Steptoe & Son Ride Again) is a 1973 British comedy drama film directed by Peter Sykes and starring Wilfrid Brambell and Harry H. Corbett. It was written by Ray Galton and Alan Simpson.

The film was a spin-off from the BBC television comedy series of the same name (1962–1974) about father-and-son rag-and-bone merchants. It is a sequel to the film Steptoe and Son (1972).

== Plot ==
The Steptoes have retired their horse Hercules due to lameness, and plan to buy a new one with Albert's life savings of £80, putting £9 away for "emergencies". Harold returns several hours later from Southall Market, drunk, and introduces Hercules the Second, a short sighted racing greyhound. Harold reveals to Albert that he purchased this from local gangster and loan shark Frankie Barrow for the £80 plus a further £200 owing on top. Furthermore, he plans to pay a small fortune to keep it fed on egg and steak.

They eventually have to sell all of their possessions to have one final bet on their dog at the races to try to pay off the money they owe. When their dog loses, they just about lose hope when Albert brings up that he had saved £1,000 in a life insurance policy. Harold then schemes to get the money from his father by faking his death. They find an old mannequin among their collection of junk and fit it around Albert's body. They then call Dr. Popplewell, a known alcoholic (and myopic) doctor, who is drunk at the time of seeing Albert and he announces that Albert has died. The next day, Harold then brings home a coffin that he has been saving for the inevitable day that his father would actually die. Albert is horrified when Harold tells him he also bought a tombstone because the undertaker was having a sale.

Later on, the gangsters turn up to collect the outstanding debt, but after some intimidation Harold manages to stave them off when he shows them that Albert has "died" and they will get their money when the insurance policy pays out. Later on, old friends of Albert's come to visit and pay their respects to Albert. They announce that they have arranged a large funeral for him, which is not good news for either of the Steptoes as they had planned a very quiet service so that no one knows. Later on an entire army of mourners come to the Steptoe household for a wake. At this time the coffin has been filled with scrap metal equivalent to Albert's weight whilst he hides upstairs.

Mr Russell from the insurance company arrives. Harold meets him to collect the proceeds - only to find out that all of the insurance money is to go to a lover that Albert met in 1949 while Harold was in the army in Malaya. A furious Harold asks why he did not have the policy amended, but Albert's only excuse is "I forgot." Harold concocts a way of bringing Albert back to life. However once inside the coffin, Albert falls into a deep sleep and nothing seems to wake him up. Harold tries to wake him several times during the journey to the cemetery, however on the way he is hit in the head by the back door of a removal truck. The mourners decide to take Harold to the hospital and carry on to the funeral without him. At the hospital Harold runs away and gets a taxi to the cemetery.

There Harold accidentally smashes into a tomb and whilst being buried Albert finally wakes up and frightens everyone away. The vicar runs off and meets Harold looking like he himself is one of the undead. Back home, the Steptoes discover that the insurance claim would have paid out to Harold after all, due to a clause that Albert had put in the policy if his mistress ever married. He cashes the policy in and receives £876. They pay off their debt and buy a new horse with new riding equipment, but to Albert's horror, Harold invests the rest of the money in a part share of a race horse. He discovers that his partner is called H.M. Queen.

== Cast ==
- Wilfrid Brambell as Albert Steptoe
- Harry H. Corbett as Harold Steptoe
- Diana Dors as woman in flat
- Milo O'Shea as Dr Popplewell
- Bill Maynard as George
- Neil McCarthy as Lennie
- Yootha Joyce as Freda, Lennie's wife
- George Tovey as Percy
- Olga Lowe as Rita, Percy's wife
- Sam Kydd as Claude
- Joyce Hemson as Flo, Claude's wife
- Henry Woolf as Frankie Barrow
- Geoffrey Bayldon as vicar
- Frank Thornton as Mr Russell
- Richard Davies as butcher
- Stewart Bevan as vet
- Peter Brayham as the chicken/pigeon keeper (uncredited)

== Production ==
The removal company featured in the film was the then state-owned Pickfords Removals.

The greyhound racing scenes were shot at White City Stadium.

Greyhound training was filmed in Acton Park.

== Reception ==
The Monthly Film Bulletin wrote:

"Can you see anything you like?", asks Diana Dors as she bends low over a drinks cabinet, revealing her knickers. The tone is thus set early on for the second Steptoe film, which – like the first – retains the trappings but none of the subtlety or intimacy of the original TV series. ... [Galton and Simpson's] original wit, their gift for dialogue (spoken and unspoken), their sharp observation of middle-class behaviour, and their genius for barely perceptible exaggeration of character and situation, have all been sacrificed to the demands of the basic British screen comedy with its emphasis on lavatories, booze, breasts and (curiously enough) the hilarity of death. Harry H. Corbett and Wilfrid Brambell, willing as they are to keep the characters alive, can do little within these confines to revive the complex, tragi-comic love/hate relationship of father and son which sustained their slim television anecdotes, and it takes Milo O'Shea, as a tipsy, myopic GP, to demonstrate what can be done, even with debased material, to dredge up a few laughs. Peter Sykes has at least tried to direct the whole enterprise as a film rather than as a blown-up Comedy Playhouse, and one happy result is a lively, ghoulish climax which almost comes off.

The Radio Times Guide to Films gave the film 2/5 stars, writing: "This second movie featuring the nation's favourite junkmen is very much a rags-and-bones affair, with the material stretched to fraying point to justify the running time. Apart from the unnecessary crudeness of its humour, the main problem here is the dilution of the intense, disappointed fondness that made the pair's TV relationship so engaging. Weakly scripted."

Comparing it to the first Steptoe film, Leslie Halliwell described the sequel as: "even more crude and out of character."
