= Kenco =

British coffee brand

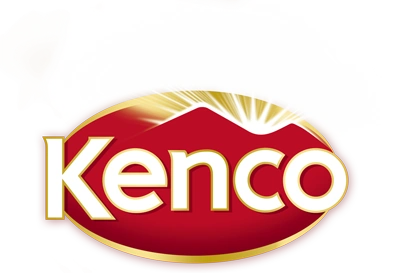
- Product type: Coffee
- Current owner: JDE Peet's (sale to Keurig Dr Pepper pending)
- Country: United Kingdom
- Introduced: 1923; 103 years ago
- Markets: United Kingdom & Ireland
- Previous owners: Mondelez International; Kraft Foods Inc. General Foods; Premier Foods; Cadbury Schweppes; Trust Houses Ltd; John Gardner
- Tagline: "Made to Uplift"
- Website: https://www.kenco.co.uk/

Kenco is a British brand of instant coffee sold by JDE Peet's in the United Kingdom and Ireland. Originally known as the Kenya Coffee Company, they started distributing coffee to Britain in 1923. Shortly after, they opened a coffee shop in Sloane Square and then changed their name to Kenco in 1962.

In 2008, the brand was relaunched with 75% of the beans for its instant range being sourced from Rainforest Alliance certified farms. The company sources their coffee beans from Brazil, Costa Rica, Colombia, Peru, Ethiopia, Vietnam and Indonesia.

== History ==
Kenco was founded in 1923 by a co-operative of retired White Kenyan coffee growers who traded as "The Kenya Coffee Company Limited". Soon, L.C. Gibbs and C.S. Baines began selling coffee from a shop in Vere Street, Mayfair. The shop sold roast and ground coffee locally but most of its sales were by mail order, selling coffee to country houses using advertisements in publications such as Tatler, Country Life and The Times.

As demand increased, the company moved to number 30 Sloane Street, London, next door to a food merchants called John Gardiner. Gardiner ran a food wholesale business, restaurants and provided outdoor catering at events such as the Wimbledon Tennis Championships. Through the 1930s the company expanded further with premises in Bermondsey and Earlsfield.

After World War II, Tom Kelly, a Gardiner employee, persuaded the company to buy the Kenya Coffee Company. On completion of the deal, Kelly was put in charge of the new business and he expanded the retail chain. As well as selling coffee by mail order and from the Sloane Street premises, Kelly diversified into catering and opened eleven coffee shops in locations such as Wimbledon, King's Road and Golders Green. These Kenya Coffee Company shops may well have been the first branded high street coffee shops in the UK. In the 1960s, the cafés were thriving, selling not only coffee but all sorts of cakes as well. Besides the coffee shop activity, Kelly also acquired the rights to sell Gaggia machines, and so the company started to sell espresso machines to other coffee bars.

In 1962, the Kenyan Coffee Company changed its name into the Kenco Coffee Company, to reflect that the amount of coffee the company bought from Kenya was decreasing. In October 1964, Trust Houses purchased John Gardiner. Trust Houses sold Kenco to Cadbury Schweppes in 1969.

In the 1980s, Kenco introduced instant freeze-dried coffee. In 2011 the brand introduced the first 'whole bean instant' coffee, called Millicano: a blend of 15% roast & ground coffee and instant coffee. Within four weeks, it had sold nearly a million packs, and became their most successful coffee launch ever. The business was sold, along with Typhoo and Hartley's by Cadbury Schweppes in 1986 to a management buyout, who named themselves Premier Brands, but Kenco was sold a year later to General Foods, in an agreement which had helped Hillsdown purchase Premier. The acquisition led to General Foods being the market leading manufacturer of coffee in the United Kingdom with a 25% share. In 1989, Kenco became part of Kraft General Foods, after Philip Morris International, its owner merged the business with its other food operation Kraft Foods Inc. In 1995, the company was renamed Kraft Foods, before it was split into two entities, with Kenco becoming part of Mondelēz International.

In 2014, Mondelez merged its coffee operations with DE Master Blenders to form Jacobs Douwe Egberts. in August 2025, Keurig Dr Pepper agreed to purchase the patent company for $18 billion.

Kenco’s claim of responsible sourcing has been questioned by The Investigative Desk, a co-operative made up of specialised investigative journalists based out of The Netherlands who argued that JDE Peet’s claims of “responsibly sourced” coffee does not guarantee the absence of human rights violations.

In June 2026, during the UK and Ireland’s ongoing cost of living crisis, Kenco utilised shrinkflation in order to “…better align with shopper missions.” As part of this alignment, the price of their range of instant coffees have increased from £4 per 100g to £5.85p. A change in packaging design has resulted in all Smooth, Rich and Decaf coffee jars reducing the amount of coffee per jar from 200g to 190g. Simultaneously, the new jars also include a new recipe which Kenco claims offers “a richer, more authentic taste.” Kenco has assured customers that these changes have allowed for further “investments in the brand,” and that “costs reflect spending on innovation, sustainability, and quality.”
