= Clochemerle =

1934 French novel

- The cover page of the 1939 edition
- Author: Gabriel Chevallier
- Original title: Clochemerle. Roman.
- Language: French
- Subject: Political satire
- Genre: Satirical novel
- Publisher: Flammarion (Paris)
- Publication date: 1934
- Publication place: France
- English publication date: 1936

Clochemerle, published in the United States as The Scandals of Clochemerle, is a satirical novel by the French writer Gabriel Chevallier (1895–1969) which was first published in 1934. It centres on local politics and personal rivalries in the fictional village of Clochemerle, inspired by Vaux-en-Beaujolais, in Beaujolais, in 1923 and satirises the conflict between clericalists and republicans under the French Third Republic. The story concerns a dispute over the local mayor's decision to build a pissoir (public urinals) adjacent to the village church; this escalates into a national political crisis and derails a major international conference. In its satirical portraits of the village's individual inhabitants, Clochemerle is an example of observational humour.

The book received considerable public acclaim and was awarded the Prix Courteline in 1934. The cartoonist Albert Dubout was subsequently commissioned to create an illustrated version. Chevallier subsequently wrote two sequels to the work after the Second World War, titled Clochemerle Babylone (1951) and Clochemerle-les-Bains (1963). The term Clochemerle and adjective clochemerlesque have entered French as a term to describe "petty, parochial squabbling".

Clochemerle has been widely translated into other languages and has inspired numerous dramatisations. Raymond Souplex composed an operetta based on the work in 1944, and a film was produced in 1948. There have been several television series based on the work, notably a 1972 BBC dramatisation.

== See also ==
- The Little World of Don Camillo and Peppone (1948)
