= Bellion =

Bellion may refer to:

- David Bellion (born 1982), French footballer of Senegalese origin
- Dominique Bellion (1948–2025), French civil servant (prefect)
- Jon Bellion (born 1990), American singer, songwriter, producer and rapper
- Roger Bellion (1914–1986), French civil servant (prefect) and French writer using the pseudonym Roger Rabiniaux
