= Hôtel de Ville, Villefranche-sur-Saône =

Town hall in Villefranche-sur-Saône, France

Hôtel de Ville
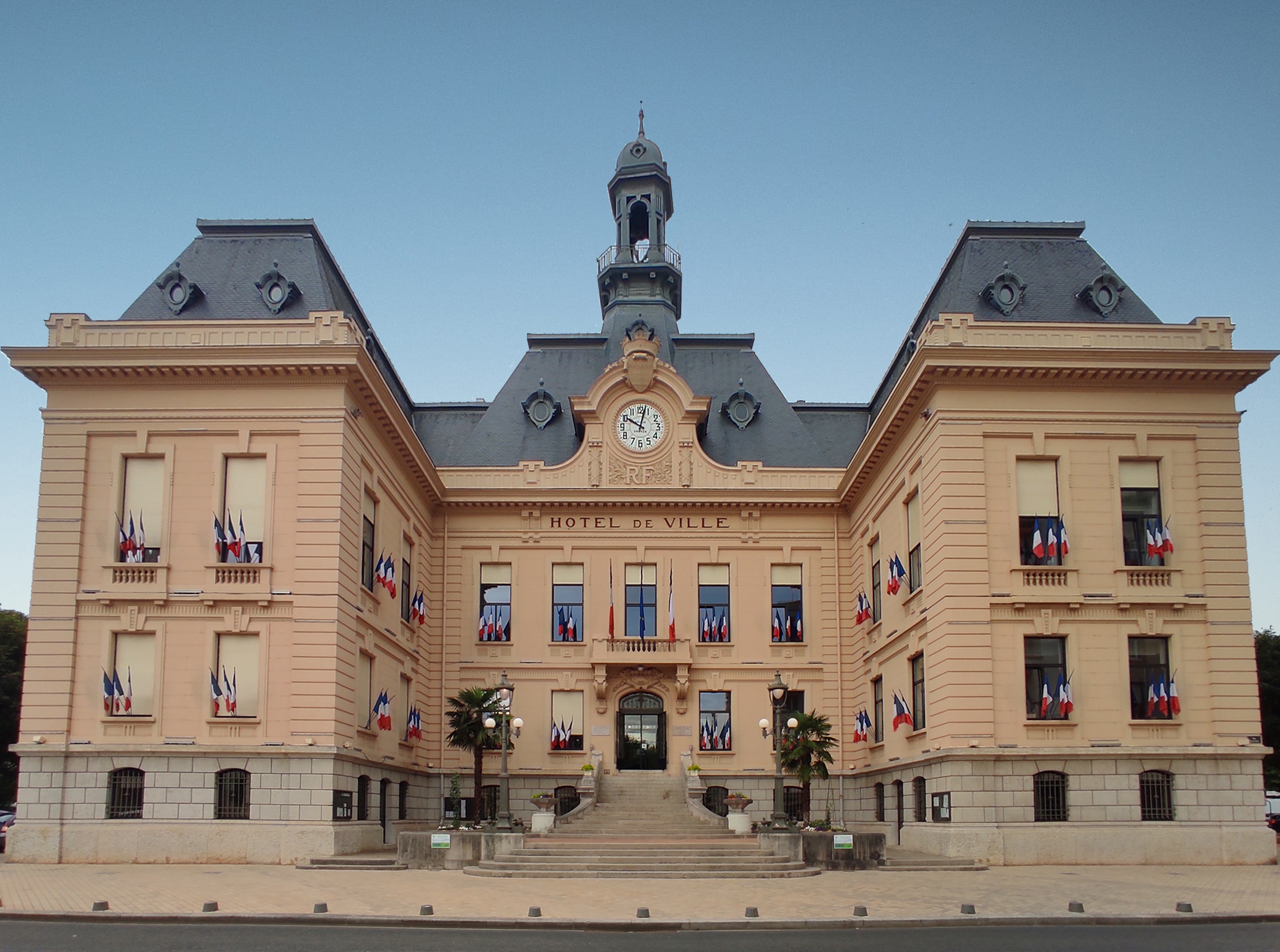
- The main frontage of the Hôtel de Ville in May 2022
- Interactive map of the Hôtel de Ville area

General information
- Type: City hall
- Architectural style: Neoclassical style
- Location: Villefranche-sur-Saône, France
- Coordinates: 45.9888°N 4.7153°E
- Completed: 1928

Design and construction
- Architects: Camille Nallet and Albain Decœur

The Hôtel de Ville (French pronunciation: [otɛl də vil], City Hall) is a municipal building in Villefranche-sur-Saône, Rhône, in eastern France, standing on Rue de la Paix.

== History ==
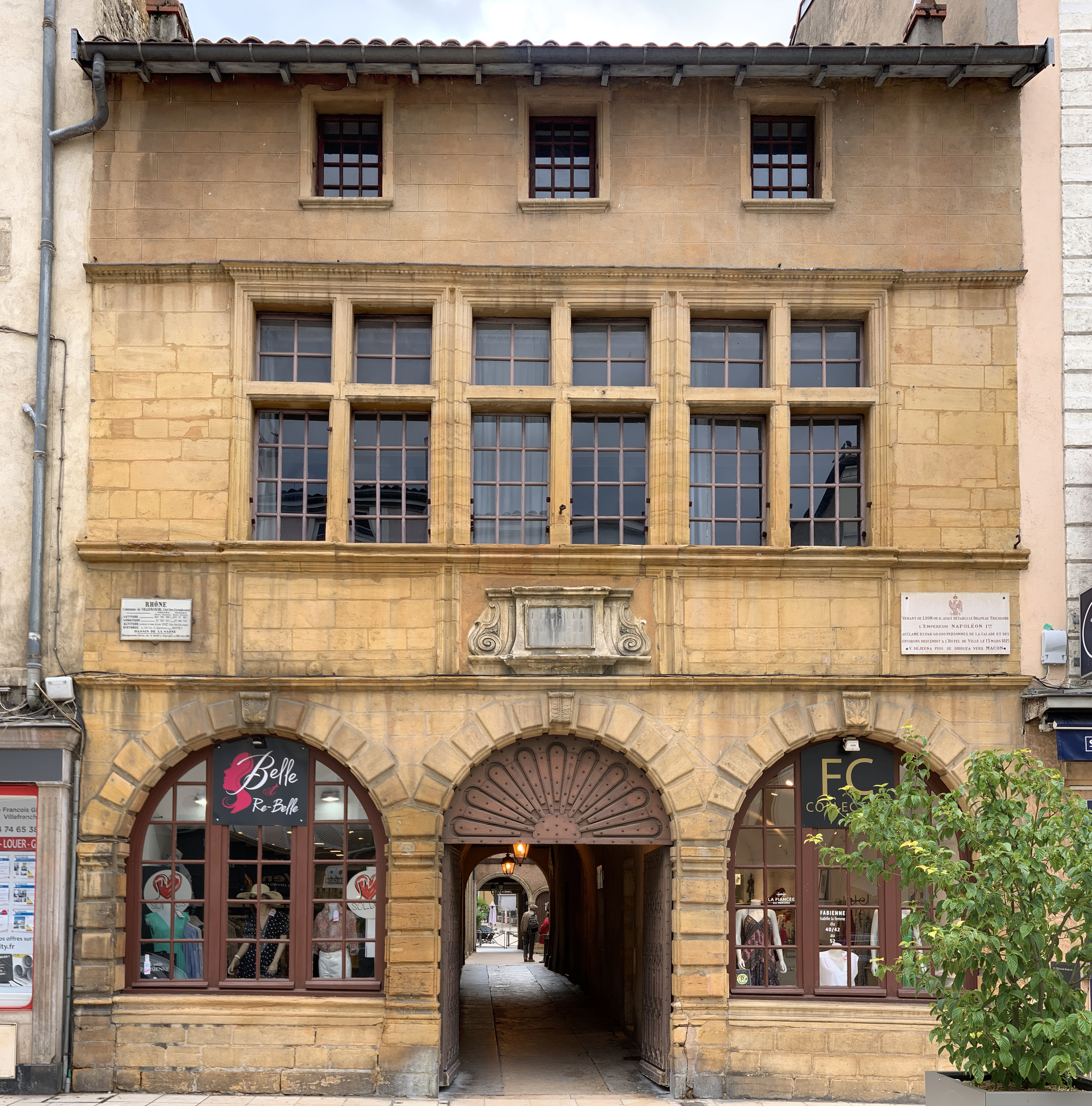
The old town hall

The old town hall, on the west side of Rue Nationale, was commissioned by the aldermen of the town and completed in 1529. After being destroyed by the Huguenots led by François de Beaumont during the French Wars of Religion, it was rebuilt in 1581. It was enlarged westwards to create a courtyard in 1589 and again in 1648. The work was largely completed by 1660, as evidenced by a plaque above the central opening on the front of the building. After the French Revolution, it became the meeting place of new town council.

The design involved a symmetrical main frontage of three bays facing onto Rue Nationale. The central bay featured a round headed opening with voussoirs and a keystone, providing access to the courtyard behind. The outer bays were fenestrated by Diocletian windows with voussoirs and keystones on the ground floor. There were six mullioned and transomed windows on the first floor and three square-shaped windows on the second floor.

Following Napoleon's return from exile on the island of Elba, he passed through the town on 13 March 1815 and visited the town hall, where he was welcomed by a crowd of 60,000 people before having lunch with the councillors. He then departed for Mâcon, where he spent the night, before travelling on to Paris. After no longer being required for municipal use, the building became the home of the local veterans' association, the Association des Combattants de l'Union Française, in the 1960s; the association established a small museum there.

In 1924, the council led by the mayor, Abel Besançon, decided to commission a more substantial town hall. The site they selected, on the west side of Rue de la Paix, was occupied by a former dyeworks owned by the Société Anonyme de Blanchiments, Teintures et Impressions (S. A. B. T. I.), a business which had been established in Lyon in 1896. The new building was designed in the neoclassical style by Camille Nallet and, following his death in December 1927, by Albain Decœur. It was built in ashlar stone and was officially opened by the mayor, Armand Chouffet, on 2 September 1928.

The design involved a symmetrical main frontage of nine bays facing onto Rue de la Paix, with the last two bays on each side projected forward as pavilions. The central section of five bays featured a sweeping flight of steps leading up to a doorway with a moulded surround and an elaborate keystone. There was a French door with a balcony and keystone on the first floor and, at roof level, there was an entablature, a modillioned cornice and a clock flanked by pilasters supporting a semi-circular pediment. Behind the clock, there was an octagonal lantern. The other bays were fenestrated by casement windows with keystones and there were quoins at the corners. Internally, the principal rooms were the Salle des Mariages (wedding room), which was decorated by the painter, Eugène Flachat, and the Salle du Conseil (council chamber), which was decorated by the painter, Pierre Vitet.

Following the liberation of the town by troops of the French First Army, commanded by General Jean de Lattre de Tassigny, on 3 September 1944, some 4,000 German troops lined up in front of the town hall to surrender their weapons.
