= Raphaël Toussaint =

French painter (born 1937)

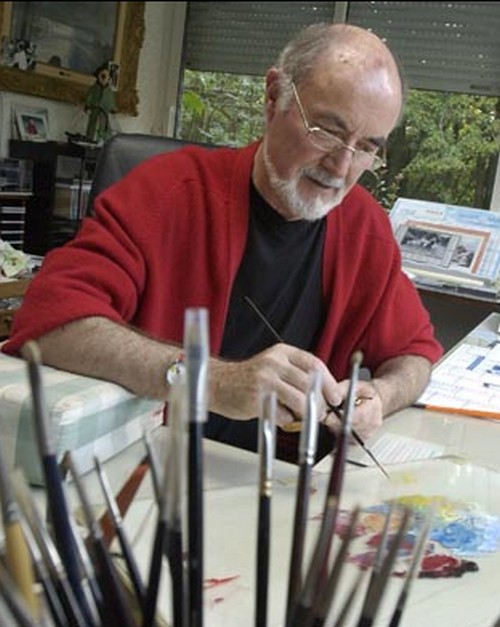
- Toussaint in 2001
- Born: Jacques de la Croix; April 25, 1937 (age 88); La Roche-sur-Yon, France
- Known for: Painting and lithography
- Awards: Médaille de la Ville de Paris, Chevalier des Arts et Lettres, Prix Germain David-Nillet
- Website: raphael-toussaint.fr

Jacques de la Croix (born 25 April 1937), better known as Raphaël Toussaint, is a French painter residing in the Vendée department. Landscape designer, he practices "poetic reality".

His motto as a painter is:

"Knowing how to see, knowing how to perceive, knowing how to design"

== Biography ==
In 1956, while studying classical singing, Jacques de la Croix, the future Raphaël Toussaint, met the one who became his wife in 1959. As a result, he met René Robin: the father of his future wife who ran a store in La Roche-sur-Yon which later became the Robin gallery. For Raphaël Toussaint, this meeting was a determining element that influenced the course of his life.

"The genesis of this rebirth [is] due to the meeting of another Yonnais, René Robin, director of the art gallery that bears his name"; explains journalist Bertrand Illegems.

“Without his father-in-law, the irreplaceable René Robin, always present in his works, who trained and supported so many painters (Albert Deman, Henry Simon, Paul Dauce, Joël Dabin, Roger Ducrot ...), Raphaël Toussaint would not have become what he is today, a magician of beauty in the service of truth”, writes journalist Hervé Louboutin.

Called to do his military service, it was in 1957 that he embarked in civilian clothes on the Sidi Bel Abbès II bound for Oran (Algeria) where he disembarked on 13 July. He studied at the Nouvion military camp near Oran at the 21st RTA. On 16 November, he was assigned to the 2nd RI 3rd company, at "ferme 35" in the Aumale region south of Algiers. Seriously wounded during the night of 8–9 April, he was repatriated to France in May and permanently retired as a major war invalid.

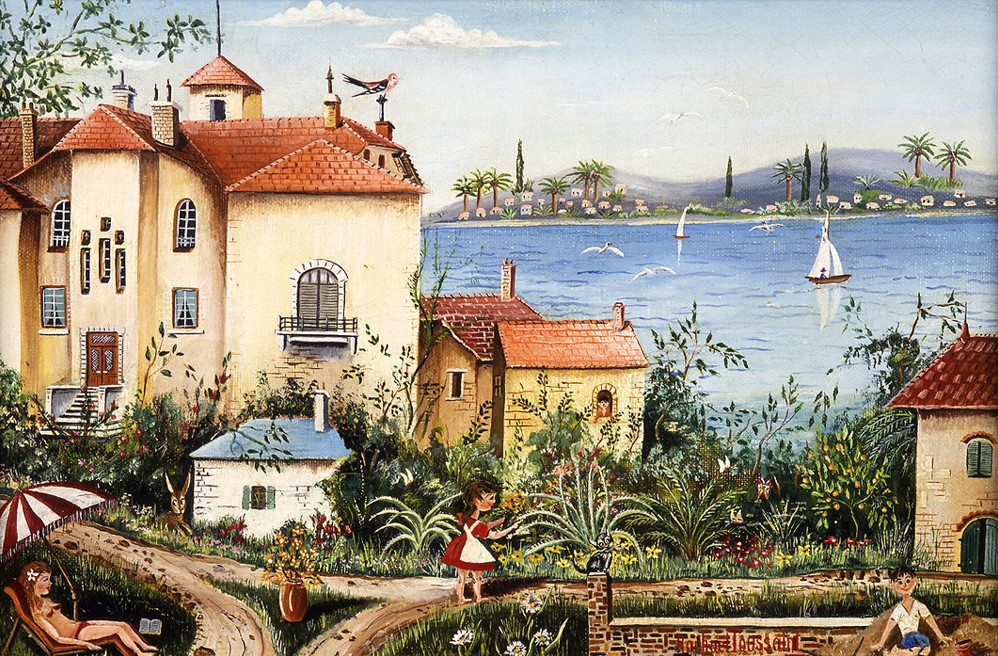
Vacances à Saint Raphaël by Raphaël Toussaint (1963).

After this injury, Jacques de la Croix could no longer continue studying the classical singing he had practised since his adolescence. His career as a singer halted, he decided to devote himself entirely to painting, helped by his father-in-law, René Robin, and he changed his name to become Raphaël Toussaint. With René Robin, he came into direct contact with the landscape and began his first period. His painting Holidays in Saint Raphaël would determine the profile of what became the definitive expression of his art. René Robin directed him towards naive art, because he felt that his vocation is there thanks to his patience and meticulousness. Until 1970, he worked under the secrecy of anonymity in order to make sure that his choice to devote himself entirely to painting was not an adventure without a future. In 1965, he began his first exhibitions in different galleries and that he was selected the following year to participate in the Salon "Comparaisons" at the Grand Palais (Paris). A few years passed where he affirmed his talent and in 1971 he was appointed Member of the Salon d'Automne. "Be congratulated and thanked, your work is beneficial, it carries within it the true values of life, the quiet and firm certainty that happiness is in simplicity, and not in money which is a lure. To build a work such as yours, in our times of anguish and iron, dear Raphaël Toussaint, is to bring us closer to the angels ... " declares Édouard Georges Mac-Avoy, the president of Salon d'Automne, in 1990.

His life as a professional and official painter then came to light. In 1973, he formalized his pseudonym Raphaël Toussaint by means of a notarial deed. In a publication in 2004, the art collector and critic Henri Griffon considers him a symbol of this movement of expression of modern primitive. "He is not an imitator, nor a follower, he is Toussaint. On the walls of a gallery, the informed eye will recognize the invoice of a great master", thus estimates Henri Griffon.

=== Paris-Grand Palais-Exposition 1982 "The Genius of the Naive" ===
The following year, at the Salon de la Nationale des Beaux Arts, he was appointed Associate by President François Baboulet.

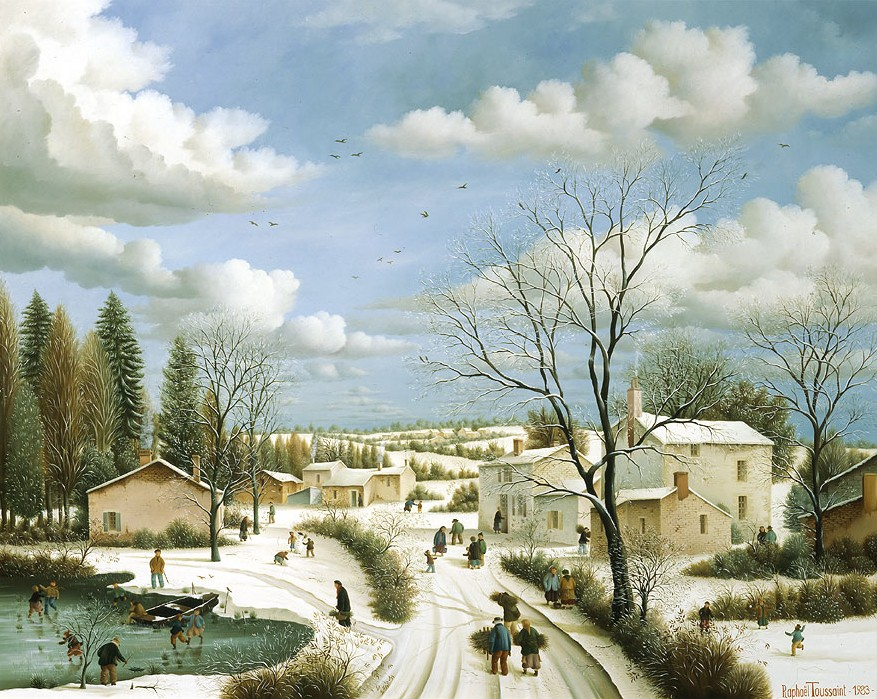
On a beautiful winter morning by Raphaël Toussaint (1988).

He exhibited his painting, On a beautiful winter morning. This painting was stolen from the Grand Palais in Paris during the Salon de la Nationale des Beaux Arts and never found.

To pay tribute to his Mentor René Robin, whom he includes in all his paintings, Raphaël Toussaint publishes a wax seal which is affixed to the back of each of his works as a second signature.

Wanting to give a new dimension to his career, he wrote and implemented in 1990 a work of art The very rich hours of Raphaël Toussaint, prefaced by various personalities from the world of the arts including Paul Guth. The latter writes: "Raphaël Toussaint, a naive painter? ... A problem that bothers him. In France, country of labels, we stuck this one on the overcoat. And to me too. Him, in painting, me in literature for my romantic cycle of the Naive. Labels twins. Did this naive title bother you? he asks me. I answer for both of us: yes and no. Naive does not mean silly, beta, idiotic. Naive comes from the Latin word nativus, as on the day of his birth. The naive is the one who is born every day, and the world with him. It has the spirit of childhood, one of the treasures of Saint Francis of Assisi". He exhibited in numerous salons and galleries in France but also in particular in the United States (in Texas and Florida. In Paris, he exhibited at Galerie 93 du Faubourg Saint-Honoré for twenty-five years, between 1965 and 1991 (gallery closed). Locally, the Vendée department organized a major retrospective for his thirty years of painting (1964–1994). In 2001, the Sainte-Croix des Sables-d'Olonne museum, opens its doors to him for a major exhibition "Landscape or a certain regard". He regularly takes part in the Parisian Salons of which he is a member.

== Awards ==
- 2000 : Médaille de la ville de Paris
- 2004 : Chevalier des Arts et Lettres
- 2010 : Prix Francis Davis Millet

== Exhibitions ==
Year	Venue	Location	Description
1965	Biennale de la Loire-Atlantique	La Baule	Collective exhibition
1966	Galerie René Robin	La Roche-sur-Yon	Individual exhibition
1968	Salon Comparaisons	Paris	Collective exhibition
1968-1969	Galerie Jannel	Paris	Permanent exhibit
1968-1980	Galerie 93 et par le monde	Paris	Permanent exhibit
1971	Salon d'automne	Paris	Collective exhibition – Becomes a member of the Salon d'Automne
1972-1979	Galerie Saint Dominique	Lyon	Permanent exhibit
1974	Salle de l'Ardoise verte	Beauvoir-sur-Mer	Ten years of painting – Individual retrospective exhibition
1975	Salle municipale Levallois-Perret	Nanterre	Collective exhibition - World Fair of Naive Painting
1979-1986	Phillips gallery	Palm Beach-Dallas-Houston	Permanent exhibit
1980-1981	Galerie Simon Chaput	Les Sables-d'Olonne et Parthenay	Permanent exhibit
1981	Musée	La Roche-sur-Yon	Exhibition « Figures »
1982	Musée	La Roche-sur-Yon	Individual exhibition - « Chemins - 50 years of painting and homage to the Salon yonnais »
1982	Grand Palais	Paris	Salon of Independent Artists "The genius of the naive"
1982	Phillips gallery	Palm Beach	"Two masters of primitive school"
1983	Nationale des beaux-arts	Paris	Exhibition and becomes a member
1983	Centre Neptune	Nantes	Exhibition "Air and Space"
1983-1985	Galerie « Arts Lésigny »	Lésigny	Permanent exhibit
1984	Galerie « Arts Lésigny »	Lésigny	Christmas Salon (guest of honor)
1984	Musée des Beaux-Arts	La Rochelle	Seventh Fine Arts Fair (guest of honor)
1984-1986	Salon International d'Art naïf (S.I.A.N)	Paris	Collective exhibition (see) Grand Palais
1985	Galerie « Café de la paix »	Paris	International pictorial meetings, "A moment of peace"
1986-1991	Galerie 93	Paris	Permanent exhibit
1988	Salle de la Martelle	Le Poiré-sur-Vie	1st painting salon, (Raphaël Toussaint and friends)
1989	Galerie le Vieux château	Angers	Salon d'Automne - Collective exhibition
1990	Salle de la mairie	Cholet	Collective exhibition - "30 contemporary painters"
1990	Peinture murale	Le Poiré-sur-Vie	The mayor Léon Darnis commissions a 150 square metres (1,600 sq ft) mural painting to complete in the heart of the city
1991-1994	Galerie cannoise	Cannes	Individual exhibition
1992	Nolan-Rankin gallery	Houston	Collective exhibition
1992	Musée	Noirmoutier	Jacques Oudin, senator of the Vendée, commissioned a painting for the museum
1992	Trésor public	La Roche-sur-Yon	Exhibition at the General Treasury
1992	Crédit Mutuel	La Roche-sur-Yon	Exhibition on lithography
1993-1994	Galerie Colette Dubois	Paris	Collective exhibition
1993	Mairie du 9eme arr.	Paris	Third Biennial "Arts without time-Dreamlands" guest of honor
1994	Hôtel du dépt	La Roche-sur-Yon	"30 years of painting across the Vendée" Individual exhibition
1997-1998	Galerie du Mas d'Artigny	Saint-Paul-de-Vence	Individual exhibition
1999	Carrousel du Louvre	Paris	Exhibition of his painting "Hommage au Vendée Globe" at the Fine Arts salon
1999	Salon d'automne	Paris	Collective exhibition - Obtains the "Arts-Sciences-Lettres" vermeil medal.
1999-2000	Galerie du Dauphin	Honfleur-Megève-Courchevel	Collective exhibition
2000	Salon Comparaisons	Paris	Collective exhibition
2000	Salon d'automne	Paris	Collective exhibition - Receives the silver cross of "French Merit and Dedication"
2000	Salon d'automne	Paris	Collective exhibition - Receives the medal of the city of Paris.
2001	Musée de l'Abbaye Saint-Croix	Les Sables-d'Olonne	Individual exhibition 31 March – 17 June "Landscapes, a certain look"
2001	Centre culturel	Challans	Arts week-end on the theme: lithography - guest of honour
2001	Musée de la poste	Paris	Exhibition: The most beautiful illustrated envelopes from 1750 to the present day
2001	Carrousel du Louvre	Paris	Exhibition Salon de la Nationale des Beaux Arts
2004	Galerie d'Art Élysée	Paris	Collective exhibition
2005	Théâtre Millandry	Luçon	Individual exhibition – Discover lithography
2006-2007	Galerie Villa Bellartéa	Biarritz – Anglet	Individual exhibition
2006	Salon Comparaisons Grand Palais	Paris	Collective exhibition
2007	Galerie	Brie-Comte-Robert	"Christmas colours" exhibition - Guest of honour
2008	Conseil général de la Vendée	La Roche-sur-Yon	Collective exhibition "The Vendeans and the sea, human adventures"
2009	Galerie du Sénéchal	Les Lucs-sur-Boulogne	Gallery opening - Guest of honour
2010	Carrousel du Louvre	Paris	Collective exhibition in the Salon des Beaux Arts from December 16 to 19 under the high patronage of the President of the Republic Nicolas Sarkozy. Raphaël Toussaint is awarded the Germain David-Nillet prize for his painting Hiver sur un domaine Vendéen.
2010	Lexus Gallery	La Roche-sur-Yon	Lexus Gallery presents in December, the exhibition of Raphaël Toussaint "Féerie de Noël" with his painting Vouvant - La Tour Mélusine - La valse des patineurs (The skaters' waltz).
2010	Librairie Siloë	La Roche-sur-Yon	Presentation during the month of May of the painting by Raphaël Toussaint, Beatification of Pope John Paul II (Lourdes. La Grotte de Massabielle), H.S.B. 27 centimetres (11 in) x 35 centimetres (14 in)
2015	Hôtel du département	La Roche-sur-Yon	Exhibition at the Departmental Council of the Vendée - Golden Jubilee: 50 Years of Painting - Hôtel du Département from 4 May to 3 July 2015 – La Roche-sur-Yon

== Written works ==
- Chemins-50 ans de peinture en Vendée (in French) (Imprimerie graphique de l'Ouest ed.). Le Poiré-sur-Vie: Dominique Giles. 1982. pp. 12, 77. Hommage to the Salon Yonnais - Municipal museum of La Roche-sur-Yon
- Raphaël Toussaint (August 1990). Les très riches heures de Raphaël Toussaint. Menthon-Saint-Bernard: éditions Les Sillons du Temps. ISBN 2-907077-06-6. Book of art.
- Raphaël Toussaint (October 1994). 30 ans de peinture. éditions Cénomane. On the occasion of a retrospective exhibition at the Conseil général de la Vendée
- Raphaël Toussaint (March 2001). Catalogue de l'exposition au Musée Sainte Croix les Sables d'Olonne.
- Raphaël Toussaint (2001). Paysages ou un certain regard : Raphaël Toussaint (in French). Les Sables-d'Olonne: éditions Offset Cinq. ISBN 2-908752-10-7. Paysages ou un certain regard.
- Raphaël Toussaint (2001). Quatre saisons en Vendée (in French). éditions Offset cinq. ISBN 2-908752-08-5. Illustrated agenda
- Raphaël Toussaint (November 2002). Châteaux et Hauts Lieux de Vendée. éditions Offset Cinq. ISBN 2-908752-33-6.
- Raphaël Toussaint; Antoine Richard (October 2000). Musique sur douze toiles de Raphaël Toussaint (in French). éditions Souffle et poésie. Poems

== Bibliography ==
- Dictionnaire Benezit (8 February 1999). Dictionnaire critique et documentaire des peintres, sculpteurs, dessinateurs et graveurs de tous les temps et de tous (in French). Vol. 13. éditions Gründ. p. 760. ISBN 978-2-7000-3010-5.
- Gavelle, Madeleine (1 January 1977). Les peintres naïfs-Les illuminés de l'instinct (in French). Paris: éditions Fillipachi. p. 68. ISBN 2-85018-086-6. Texte and photo of tableau Le Bouquet au chat by Raphaël Toussaint.
- Cluzel, Anne; Mory, Frédérique (2004). Vendée secrète (in French). Nantes: éditions Siloé-Kerdoré. p. 209. ISBN 2-84231-276-7. The face of a landscaper from the Vendée through his works Les mariés, La route du bonheur and Virginie ou l'enfant à la marguerite by Raphaël Toussaint.
- Collectif (July 1991). "Revue de l'Art figuratif contemporain". Art Actualité Magazine. pp. 46–48. ISSN 1146-1276. From the art of the miniature painting to the art of the monumental as seen through the works Les mariés du Poiré-sur-Vie, La peinture murale du Poiré-sur-Vie and L'église de Saint Etienne du Brioullet by Raphaël Toussaint.
- Collectif (June 1991). "Revue des Arts". Actualités des Arts. No. 5. pp. 64–65. ISSN 1157-4712. Texts and photos of the works Maison de Maître et le vieux Four à chaux and Le puy du Fou sous la neige by Raphaël Toussaint.
- Collection des Arts (2000). Art galerie (in French and Japanese). Translated by Yukitoshi Yakamoto. édition japonaise. p. 184.Texts and photos of the works Le Mont des alouettes au champ de blé de Raphaël Toussaint.
- Collection des Arts (2001). Art galerie (in French and Japanese). Translated by Yukitoshi Yakamoto. édition japonaise. p. 176. ISBN 4900011371. Texts and photos of the work La Tour d'Arundel – Les Sables d'Olonne by Raphaël Toussaint.
- Collection des Arts (2002). Art galerie (in French and Japanese). Translated by Yukitoshi Yakamoto. édition japonaise. p. 183. ISBN 490162301X. Texts and photos of the work Saint-Mars-des-Près sous la neige by Raphaël Toussaint.
- Collection des Arts (2003). Art galerie (in French and Japanese). Translated by Yukitoshi Téramoto. édition japonaise. pp. 184–185. ISBN 4901623028. Texts and photos of the works Maison de Maître et le vieux Four à chaux and Le puy du Fou sous la neige by Raphaël Toussaint.
- Barrer, Patrick-F; Bigot, Stéphanie; Lhotis, Agnès (1992). Quand l'Art du 20^{e} était conçu par des inconnus : Histoire du salon d'automne de 1903 à nos jours (in French). Montreuil: éditions Arts et Images du monde. pp. 194–195 & 282. Text and photo of the work La vieille église de Pouzauges en Vendée by Raphaël Toussaint.
- Dubois, Jacques (April 1995). Vingt grandes signatures contemporaines (in French). Paris: éditions du Chêne vert. pp. 134–136. Texts and photos of the works Vendanges au Château de la Preuille and Le Château du Puy du Fou sous la neige by Raphaël Toussaint.
