= Clochemerle (film) =

1948 film

- Directed by: Pierre Chenal
- Written by: Pierre Laroche
- Based on: Clochemerle by Gabriel Chevallier
- Produced by: Armand Rubin
- Starring: Félix Oudart; Saturnin Fabre; Jean Brochard
- Cinematography: Robert Lefebvre
- Edited by: Monique Kirsanoff
- Music by: Henri Sauguet
- Production company: Cinéma Production
- Distributed by: National Film Distribution
- Release date: 11 May 1948
- Running time: 90 minutes
- Country: France
- Language: French

Clochemerle is a 1948 French comedy film directed by Pierre Chenal and starring Félix Oudart, Saturnin Fabre and Jean Brochard. It is an adaptation of the 1934 novel Clochemerle by Gabriel Chevallier. The film's sets were designed by the art director Pierre Marquet.

== Synopsis ==
In a small town in Beaujolais a dispute breaks out when the Radical Party mayor decides to build some new public urinals opposite the church. Conservative forces led by the local priest and a baroness attempt to thwart him.

== Cast ==
- Félix Oudart as Le curé Ponosse
- Saturnin Fabre as Alexandre Bourdillat
- Jean Brochard as Piéchut
- Maximilienne as Justine Putet
- Roland Armontel as Ernest Tafardel - l'instituteur
- Jane Marken as La baronne de Courtebiche
- Simone Michels as Judith Toumignon
- Christiane Muller as Adèle Torbayon
- Paul Demange as Toumignon
- Max Dalban as Arthur Torbayon
- Jacqueline Dor as Rose Bivaque
- Mady Berry as La mère Brodequin
- Charles Dechamps as Luvelat
- Jean-Roger Caussimon as Samotras
- Christian Argentin as L'évêque
- Gaston Orbal as Poilphard
- Jack Gauthier as Claudius Brodequin
- Max Palenc as Hippolyte Foncimagne
- Lucien Guervil as Le capitaine Tardiveau
- René-Jean Chauffard as Oscar de Saint-Choul
- Pierre Labry as Nicolas
- Odette Talazac as Madame Girodot
- Wanda Ottoni as La jeune veuve
- Judith Magre as Hortense Girodot
- Georges Douking as Le préparateur
- Marcel Pérès as Le père Brodequin
- Albert Malbert as Beausoleil
- Etienne Decroux as Le docteur Mouraille
- Léon Larive as Le colonel
- Pierre Juvenet as Le préfet
- Jeanne Herviale as Honorine
- Palmyre Levasseur as Babette Manapoux
- Geneviève Morel as Fouache
- Henri Niel as L'abbé Jouffe
- George Cusin as Le notaire Girodot
- Myriam Dior as Une lavandière

== Bibliography ==
- Goble, Alan. The Complete Index to Literary Sources in Film. Walter de Gruyter, 1999.
- Rège, Philippe. Encyclopedia of French Film Directors, Volume 1. Scarecrow Press, 2009.
