= Lapin Agile =

Montmartre cabaret venue in Paris since 1880

Coordinates: 48.8886°N 2.33998°E

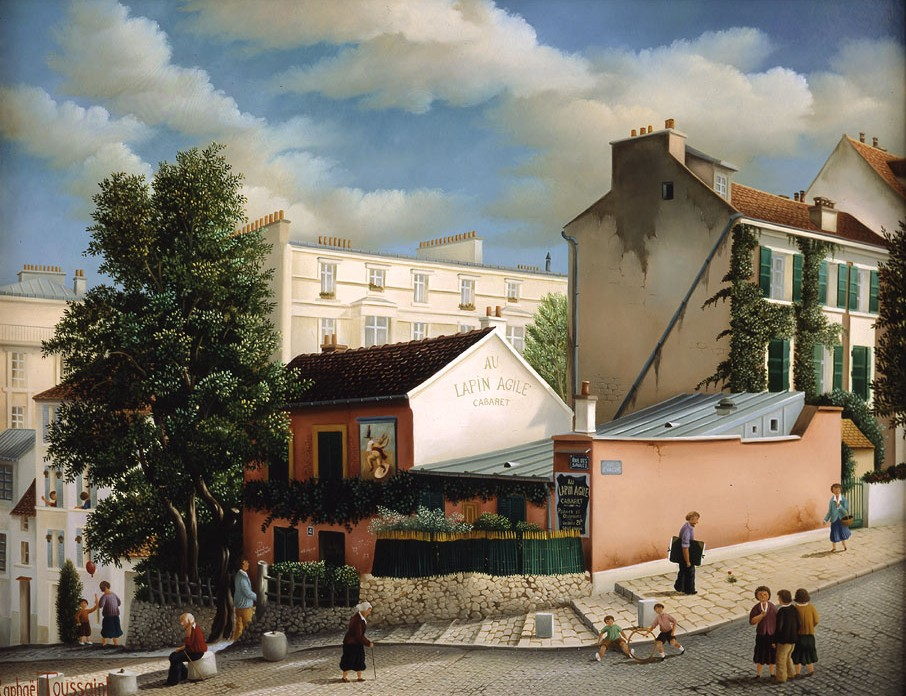
Le Lapin Agile, painting by Raphaël Toussaint

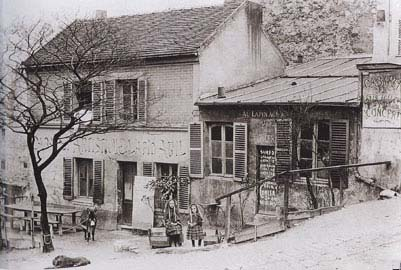
Au Lapin Agile, ca 1880–1890

Lapin Agile [la.pɛ̃ a.ʒil] is a famous Montmartre cabaret, at 22 Rue des Saules, 18th arrondissement of Paris, France.

== History ==
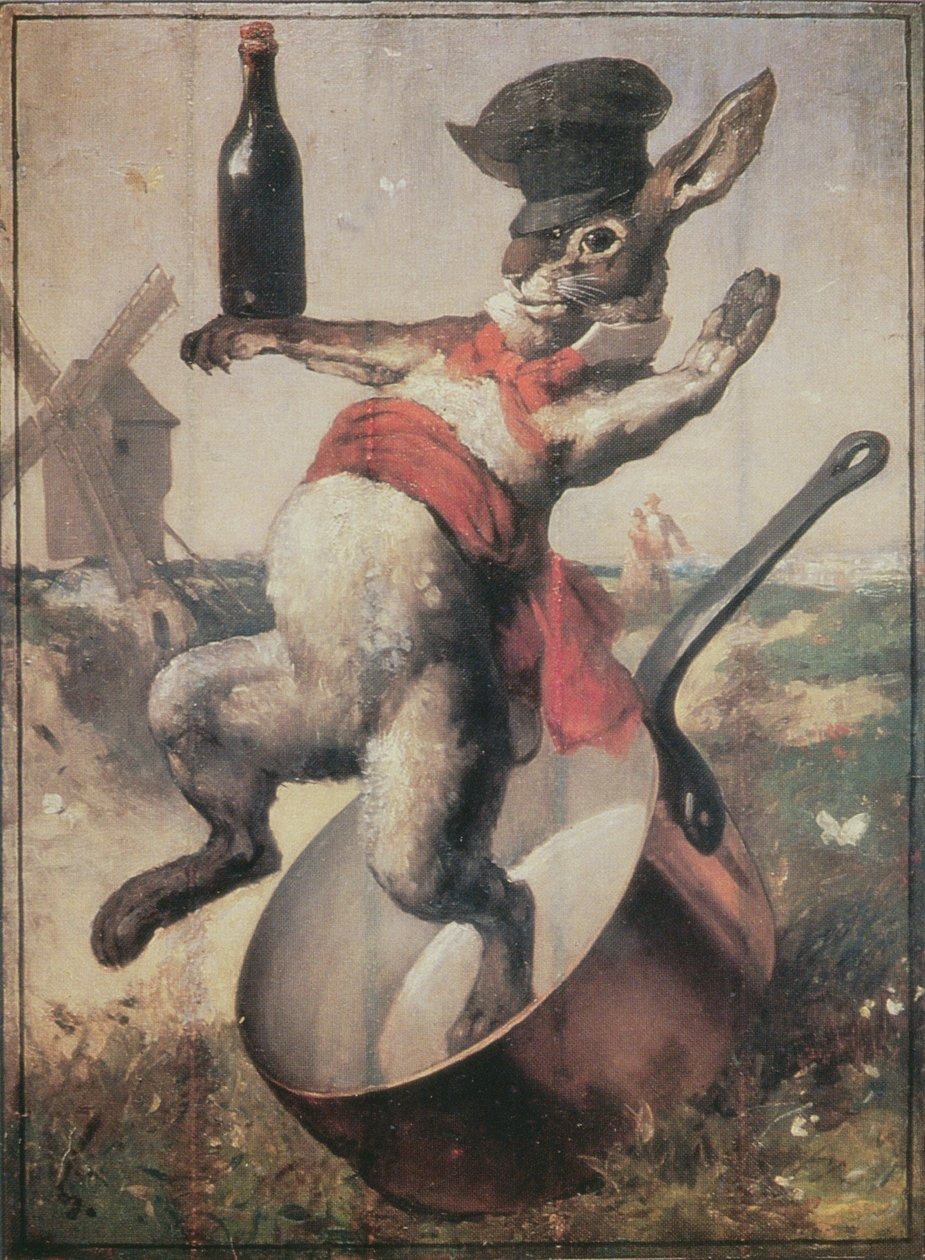
Reproduction of the "Lapin à Gill" sign

The venue existed circa 1860 under the name Au rendez-vous des voleurs, meaning "Where the Thieves Meet". Some twenty years later, the walls were decorated with portraits of famous murderers and the place became known as the Cabaret des Assassins. Tradition relates that the cabaret received this name because a band of gangsters broke in and killed the owner's son in a robbery attempt.

In 1875, the artist Andre Gill painted the sign that was to suggest its permanent name. It was a picture of a rabbit jumping out of a saucepan, and residents began calling their neighbourhood night-club Le Lapin à Gill, meaning "Gill's rabbit". Over time, the name had evolved into "Cabaret Au Lapin Agile", or the Nimble Rabbit Cabaret. The original painting on canvas was stolen in 1893; a reproduction on timber was painted to take its place.

The Lapin Agile was bought in the early twentieth century by the cabaret singer, comedian, and nightclub owner Aristide Bruant to save it from demolition. The Lapin Agile became a favourite spot for struggling artists and writers, including Picasso, Modigliani, Apollinaire, Roman Greco, and Maurice Utrillo.

The Lapin Agile is located in the centre of the Montmartre district in the 18th arrondissement of Paris, behind and slightly northwest of Sacre Coeur Basilica. Since this was the heart of artistic Paris at the turn of the twentieth century, there was much discussion at the cabaret about "the meaning of art".

The Lapin Agile was also popular with Montmartre residents including pimps, eccentrics, poorer people, local anarchists, as well as with students from the Latin Quarter and a sprinkling of upper-class bourgeoisie.

== Existing venue ==
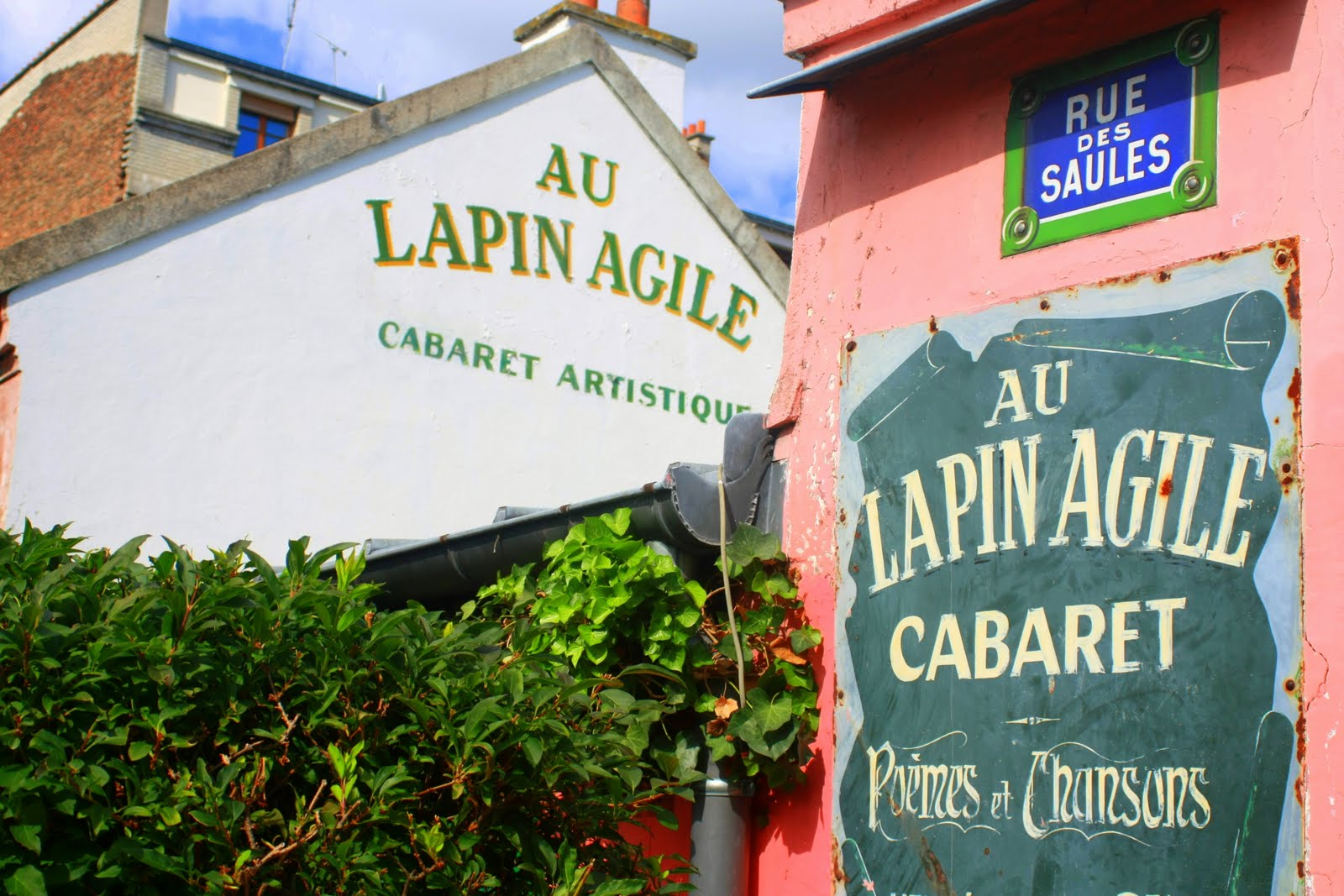
Au Lapin Agile (June 2011)

The Lapin Agile is largely unchanged and maintains its tradition as an informal cabaret venue. It is located in a stone building on the steep and cobbled Rue des Saules and showcases poets and singers who perform French songs dating back as far as the fifteenth century.

== Legacy ==
Pablo Picasso's 1905 oil painting, Au Lapin Agile ("At the Lapin Agile") helped to make this cabaret world-famous. The cabaret has been captured on canvas by other Montmartre artists, such as Roman Greco and Maurice Utrillo.

=== Stage adaptations ===
In 1993 American comedian and entertainer, Steve Martin, wrote a play, Picasso at the Lapin Agile, which had a successful run in Chicago, Los Angeles, and elsewhere. The play depicted an imagined meeting in 1904 between Pablo Picasso and Albert Einstein at the Lapin Agile.
