= Clochemerle (TV series) =

1972 British TV miniseries

- Based on: Clochemerle by Gabriel Chevallier
- Written by: Ray Galton; Alan Simpson
- Directed by: Michael Mills
- Narrated by: Peter Ustinov
- Composer: Alan Roper
- Countries of origin: United Kingdom; West Germany
- No. of series: 1
- No. of episodes: 9

Production
- Producer: Michael Mills
- Production location: France
- Cinematography: James Balfour
- Editors: Geoffrey Botterill; Christopher Rowlands
- Camera setup: Single-camera
- Running time: 30 minutes
- Production companies: British Broadcasting Corporation; Bavaria Film

Original release
- Network: BBC 2 ARD
- Release: 18 February – 14 April 1972

Clochemerle is a 1972 BBC television comedy serial based on the 1934 novel of the same name by Gabriel Chevallier, with text adapted by sitcom writers Ray Galton and Alan Simpson. Filmed on location in France, it starred Roy Dotrice, Wendy Hiller, Cyril Cusack, Kenneth Griffith, Cyd Hayman, Bernard Bresslaw, Hugh Griffith, Micheline Presle, Madeline Smith, Christian Roberts, Nigel Green, Wolfe Morris and Gordon Rollings, with narration by Peter Ustinov.

The show was made as a co-production between Britain's BBC and West Germany's Bavaria Film.

== Episodes ==
No. in series	Title	Original release date
1	"The Magnificent Idea of Barthelemey Piechut, the Mayor"	18 February 1972
2	"The Triumphant Inauguration of a Municipal Amenity"	25 February 1972
3	"The Spirited Protest of Justine Putet"	3 March 1972
4	"The Awful Awakening of Claudius Brodequin"	10 March 1972
5	"The Painful Infliction of Nicholas the Beadle"	17 March 1972
6	"The Scandalous Outcome of a Night of Destruction"	24 March 1972
7	"The Inexorable Power of the Third Republic"	31 March 1972
8	"The Dreaded Arrival of Captain Tardivaux"	7 April 1972
9	"The Glorious Triumph of Barthelemey Piechut"	14 April 1972

== Production ==
The series was shot on location in Colombier-le-Vieux, in the department of Ardèche, south of Lyon. The steam railway there, which appears in the programme, had been restored by enthusiasts the year before shooting.

== Home media ==
It was issued as a two-DVD set by RLJ Entertainment in 2013.

== See also ==
British sitcom
