= Colombier-le-Vieux =

- Commune
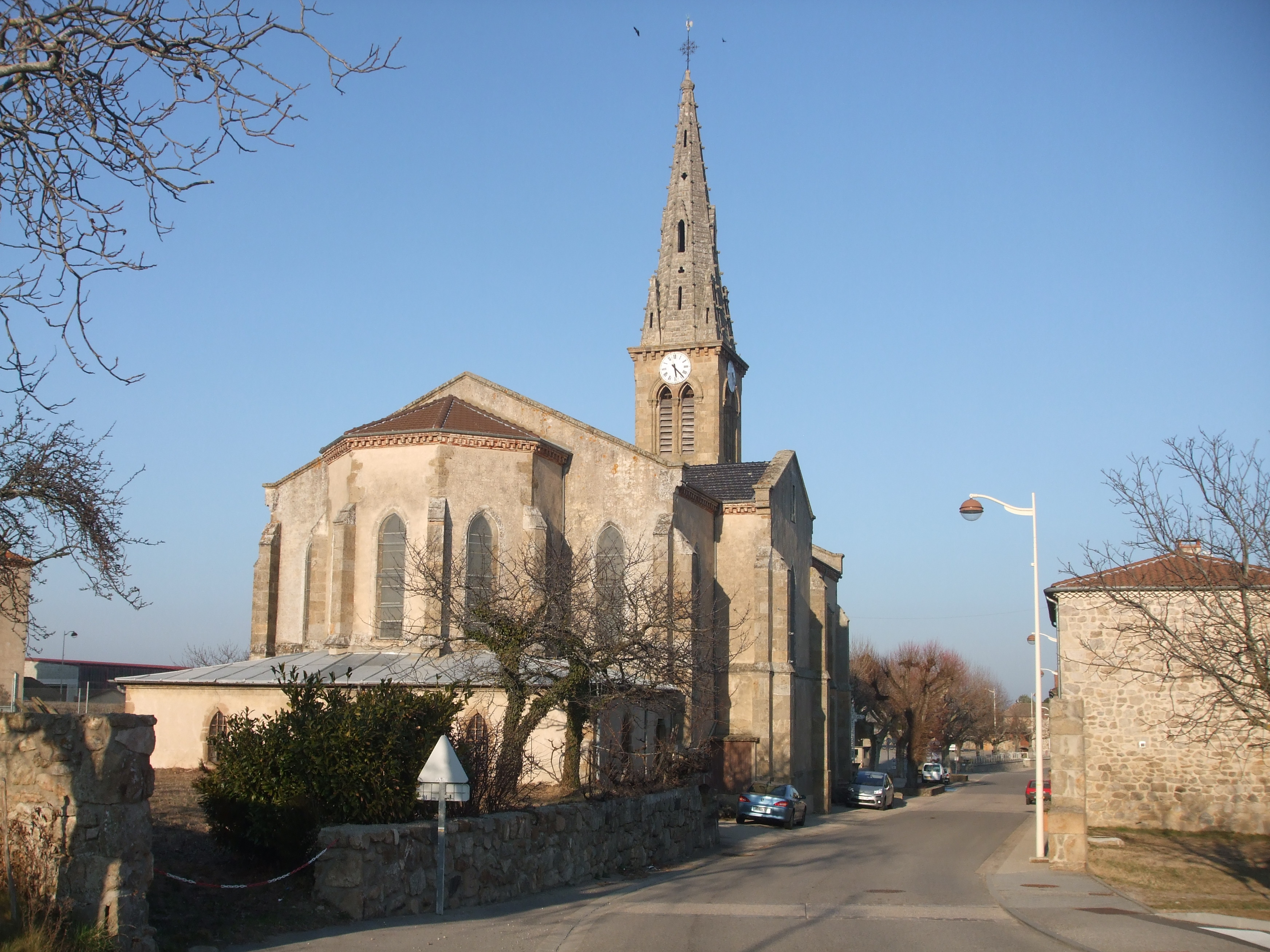
- The church in Colombier-le-Vieux
- Location of Colombier-le-Vieux
- Location within France Location within Auvergne-Rhône-Alpes
- Coordinates: 45°04′00″N 4°41′51″E
- Country: France
- Region: Auvergne-Rhône-Alpes
- Department: Ardèche
- Arrondissement: Tournon-sur-Rhône
- Canton: Haut-Vivarais
- Intercommunality: CA Arche Agglo

Government
  - Mayor (2020–2026): Béatrice Four
- Area^{1}: 15.49 km^{2} (5.98 sq mi)
- Elevation: 420 m (1,380 ft)
- Highest elevation: 486 m (1,594 ft)
- Lowest elevation: 210 m (690 ft)
- Population (2023): 690
  - Density: 45/km^{2} (120/sq mi)
- Time zone: UTC+01:00 (CET)
  - Summer (DST): UTC+02:00 (CEST)
- INSEE/Postal code: 07069 /07410
- ^{1} French Land Register data, which excludes lakes, ponds, glaciers > 1 km^{2} (0.386 sq mi or 247 acres) and river estuaries.

Colombier-le-Vieux (French pronunciation: [kɔlɔ̃bje lə vjø]; Occitan: Colombièr lo Vièlh) is a commune in the Ardèche department in southern France.

== Population ==
Historical population
Year	Pop.	±% p.a.
1968	659	—
1975	504	−3.76%
1982	471	−0.96%
1990	518	+1.20%
1999	551	+0.69%
2007	630	+1.69%
2012	663	+1.03%
2017	661	−0.06%
2023	690	+0.72%
Source: INSEE

== See also ==
- Communes of the Ardèche department
- Used as the location for the 1972 BBC Television series Clochemerle
