= Nicole de Buron =

French writer (1929–2019)

- Born: 12 January 1929; Tunis, French Tunisia
- Died: 11 December 2019 (aged 90)
- Occupation: Writer

Nicole de Buron (12 January 1929 – 11 December 2019) was a French writer.

== Biography ==
Born on 12 January 1929 in Tunis, de Buron first worked for the magazine Marie Claire before she began writing novels. She was the mother of two daughters.

Her 1958 novel Les Pieds sur le bureau won the Prix Courteline. She won the prix du Livre de l'été with the novel Qui c'est, ce garçon ? and the Grand Prize for Humor with Arrête ton cinema!. In the mid-1990s, de Buron left her longtime publisher, Groupe Flammarion, to join Plon. In 2003, she became the 3rd best-selling French novel writer. She began operating an agricultural domain in Castelreng, near Limoux in 2014. For this, she won a medal from the Order of Agricultural Merit.

Most of de Buron's works were autobiographical humorous stories. She also often engaged in self-mockery.

De Buron largely wrote the script of the TV show Les Saintes chéries, an adaptation of two of her novels. She was also the screenwriter of six comedy films, including Take It From the Top, Erotissimo, and Elle court, elle court la banlieue. She generally helped with adaptation and dialogue in films based on her novels.

== Publications ==
- Drôle de Sahara (1956)
- Et vogue la gondole! (1957)
- Les Pieds sur le bureau (1958)
- Sainte Chérie (1964)
- Sainte Chérie en vacances (1967)
- Vas-y maman (1978)
- Dix-jours-de-rêve (1982)
- Qui c'est, ce garçon ? (1985)
- C'est quoi, ce petit boulot ? (1988)
- Où sont mes lunettes ? (1991)
- Arrêtez de piquer mes sous ! (1992)
- Arrête ton cinéma ! (1994)
- Mais t'as tout pour être heureuse ! (1996)
- Chéri, tu m'écoutes ? … alors, répète ce que je viens de dire (1998)
- Mon cœur, tu penses à quoi ? - … À rien (2000)
- Docteur, puis-je vous voir… avant six mois ? (2003)
- C’est fou ce qu’on voit de choses dans la vie ! (2006)

== Filmography ==
- Erotissimo (1969)
- Elle court, elle court la banlieue (1973)
- Attention les yeux ! (1976)
- Run After Me Until I Catch You (1976)
- Take It From The Top (1978)
- Rends-moi la clé (1981)

== Television ==
- Les Saintes chéries (1965–1970)
- Qui c'est ce garçon? (1987)
- C'est quoi ce petit boulot? (1991)

== Theatre ==
- Remarie-moi (1979)
