= Armand Chouffet =

French politician (1895–1958)

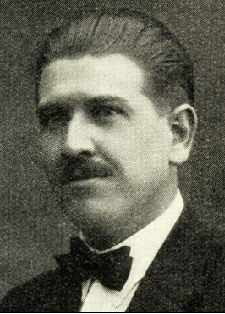

Personal details
- Born: March 4, 1895 Hérimoncourt (France)
- Died: October 28, 1958 Villefranche-sur-Saône (France)
- Party: Socialist party

Armand Chouffet (4 March 1895 - 28 October 1958) was a French politician born in Hérimoncourt, Doubs, a small town situated in the eastern part of France. He died in Villefranche-sur-Saône.

== Biography ==
Choufett, the son of a butcher, served in the French army. And in 1917, after World War I, he escaped from a German prison where he had been held since June 1916.

Choufett became a lawyer and was admitted to the Bars of Lyon and Villefranche-sur-Saône in 1924. In 1925, he became mayor of Villefranche-sur-Saône and served consecutive terms, with a brief interruption between 1941 and 1947. As mayor, he modernized the city, endowing it with a covered market, a new town hall, and several sports facilities.

In 1928, he became a member of Parliament. In the Chamber of Deputies, he was very involved in military matters and served as vice-president of the Armed Forces Committee. Re-elected in 1936, at the same time as the victory of the Popular Front, he voted in favour of the delegation of full powers to Marshall Pétain in July 1940.

In Vichy he signed a declaration concerning the National Assembly. This document, drafted by Gaston Bergery, denounced the Third Republic, claimed a new authoritarian, national and social order, asked for the return of the government in Paris, and called for renewed relations with Germany. It was in this text that the term "collaboration” appeared for the first time.

Chouffet did not move ahead in this path, and his attitude over Vichy’s government caused him to be dismissed from his mandate in 1941. He became one of the main men responsible for the Network called “Mithridate” from 1942 to the end of hostilities.

Despite controversies with local resistants about his vote in favour of Pétain, he regained the town hall of Villefranche sur Saône in 1947, and in 1956 he was reintegrated into the Socialist party. His funeral in 1958 was a large public gathering. Today his chest takes centre stage in the town hall, and a huge sports complex bears his name.

== Sources ==
- Jean Jolly (dir.), Dictionnaire des parlementaires français, notices biographiques sur les ministres, sénateurs et députés français de 1889 à 1940, PUF, 1960. (French)
- Christophe Gallet, Chroniques de la Résistance en Beaujolais, Édition de la Taillandière, 2005. (French)
- Collectif, Villefranche sur Saône, 1853-2005, 150 ans de vie caladoise, Académie de Villefranche et en Beaujolais, 2007. (French)
