= Prix Courteline =

The Prix Courteline is a French prize rewarding cinematic humour, named in tribute to Georges Courteline (1858-1929). It was founded in 1930 by Roland Dorgelès. It was originally awarded every two years.

== Winners ==
- 1930 : Marcel Andrys
- 1932 : Marcel Sauvage
- 1934 : Gabriel Chevallier
- 1936 : André Sevry
- 1938 : Marcel E. Grancher
- 1942 : Clément Richer
- 1944 : Jean Fougère
- 1946 : Marc Blancpain
- 1948 : Maurice Toesca
- 1950 : Jean Dutourd
- 1953 : Paul Guth
- 1957 : Roger Rabiniaux
- 1958 : Nicole de Buron
- 1961 : Bourvil
- 1962 : Marcel E. Grancher
- 1963 : André Couteaux
- 1964 : Bourvil et Fernandel
- 1965 : Annie Girardot
- 1967 : Louis de Funès
- 1972 : Marcel Mithois
- 1974 : Michel Audiard
- 1978 : Guy Foissy
- 1983 : Éric Westphal
- 1992 : Jacques Pessis
- 1999 : Laurent Ruquier
