= Hugues Bousiges =

French civil servant

- Born: 7 January 1948 (age 78); Rennes, Ille-et-Vilaine
- Occupation: French prefect

Hugues Bousiges (born 7 January 1948 in Rennes, Ille-et-Vilaine) is a French civil servant.

== Career ==
- 1996-1998: sub-prefect of L'Haÿ-les-Roses, Val-de-Marne, Île-de-France.
- 2002-2004: prefect of Haute-Loire in Le Puy-en-Velay.
- 2004-2005: prefect of Charente in Angoulême.
- 2007-2009: prefect of Pyrénées-Orientales in Perpignan.
- On 2009: prefect of Gard in Nîmes.

== Honours and awards ==
- France: Chevalier of the Legion of Honour
- France: Commandeur of the National Order of Merit
- France: Officier of the Ordre des Palmes Académiques
- France: Officier of the Mérite agricole
- France: Chevalier of the Ordre du Mérite Maritime
- France: Chevalier of Arts and letters

Political offices
Preceded by	Prefect of Haute-Loire; 2002–2004	Succeeded by
Preceded by	Prefect of Charente; 2004–2005	Succeeded by
Preceded by	Prefect of Pyrénées-Orientales; 2007–2009	Succeeded by
Preceded by Dominique Bellion	Prefect of Gard; 2009–2013	Succeeded by Didier Martin
