= Dominique Bellion =

French civil servant (1948–2025)

- Born: 25 August 1948; Saint-Flour, Cantal, France
- Died: 11 May 2025 (aged 76)
- Occupation: French prefect

Dominique Bellion (25 August 1948 – 11 May 2025) was a French civil servant. He served as prefect of several Departments of France.

Bellion was the son of Roger Bellion (1914–1986), a civil servant (prefect) who was also a writer and poet using the pseudonym Roger Rabiniaux.

== Career ==
- On 1991: prefect of Mayenne in Laval.
- On 1994: prefect of Aude in Carcassonne.
- On 1998: prefect of Martinique in Fort-de-France.
- On 2000: prefect of Allier in Moulins.
- On 2003: prefect of Dordogne in Périgueux.
- On 2005: prefect of Gard in Nîmes.
- On 2009: prefect of Meurthe-et-Moselle in Nancy.

As prefect of Martinique he was criticized by Prime Minister Lionel Jospin in October 1999 (strikes...).

== Honours and awards ==
- France: Chevalier of the Legion of Honour
- France: Chevalier of the National Order of Merit

== See also ==
- List of colonial and departmental heads of Martinique

Political offices
Preceded by	Prefect of Mayenne; 1991–1994	Succeeded by
Preceded by	Prefect of Aude; 1994–1998	Succeeded by
Preceded by	Prefect of Martinique; 1998–2000	Succeeded by
Preceded by Philippe Grégoire	Prefect of Allier; 2000–2003	Succeeded by Patrick Subrémon
Preceded by	Prefect of Dordogne; 2003–2005	Succeeded by
Preceded by Jean-Pierre Hugues	Prefect of Gard; 2005–2009	Succeeded by Hugues Bousiges
Preceded by Étienne Guyot	Prefect of Meurthe-et-Moselle; 2009–2010	Succeeded by Adolphe Colrat
