= Patrick Subrémon =

French civil servant

Patrick Subrémon (born 25 November 1947 in Saint-Laurent-d’Aigouze, Gard, Occitania) is a French civil servant, prefect from 2000.

He is a graduate of Institut d'études politiques d'Aix-en-Provence in Aix-en-Provence, Bouches-du-Rhône, PACA.

== Career ==
Patrick Subrémon was from 1982 to 1984 chef de cabinet (principal private secretary) to Édith Cresson minister of Agriculture (1981–1983) and minister of Foreign Trade and Tourism (1983–1984). He is one of the persons behind the project Disneyland Paris. In January 1984, going with Édith Cresson, then minister of Foreign Trade and Tourism into United States, Patrick Subrémon met Ray Watson, president of Walt Disney Productions and Frank Stanek, promoter de Tokyo Disneyland et elaborates with them the general lines of the project of Disney in Europe.

Appointed sub-prefect en 1984, and prefect en 2000, he fulfilled several offices in prefectorial administration or in the Ministry of Interior. Especially he was prefect of Haute-Saône (2000–2003), of Allier (2003–2005) of Eure-et-Loir (2005–2007) and of Indre-et-Loire (2007–2009).

He is now inspecteur général de l'administration (inspector general of administration).

== See also ==
- Inspection générale de l'administration

Political offices
Preceded by	Prefect of Haute-Saône; 2000–2003	Succeeded by
Preceded by Dominique Bellion	Prefect of Allier; 2003–2005	Succeeded by Patrick Pierrard
Preceded by	Prefect of Eure-et-Loir; 2005–2007	Succeeded by
Preceded by	Prefect of Indre-et-Loire; 2007–2009	Succeeded by
