= Gabriel Chevallier =

French writer

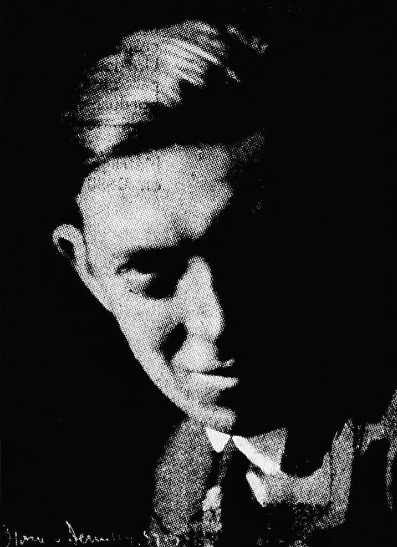
- Gabriel Chevallier, from La Femme de France (1934)
- Born: May 3, 1895; Lyon, French Third Republic
- Died: 6 April 1969 (aged 73); Cannes, Alpes-Maritimes, Provence-Alpes-Côte d'Azur, France
- Occupation: Novelist
- Writing career
- Notable works: Clochemerle; Fear

Gabriel Chevallier (3 May 1895 – 6 April 1969) was a French novelist widely known as the author of the satire Clochemerle. He is also known for Fear (La Peur), a novel about the World War I.

== Biography ==
Born in Lyon in 1895, Gabriel Chevallier was educated in various schools before entering Lyon École des Beaux-Arts in 1911. He was called up at the start of World War I and wounded in 1915, but returned to the front where he served as an infantryman until the war's end. He was awarded the Croix de Guerre and Chevalier de la Légion d'honneur. Following the war, he undertook several jobs including art teacher, journalist and a commercial traveller before starting to write in 1925. He was married with one son and died in Cannes in 1969.

== Legacy ==
Clochemerle was written in 1934 and has been translated into twenty-six languages and sold several million copies. It was dramatised first in a 1947 film by Pierre Chenal and a 1972 television series by the BBC. He wrote two sequels: Clochemerle Babylon (Clochemerle-Babylone, 1951), and Clochemerle-les-Bains (1963). In the United States, the Clochemerle books were published under the English titles The Scandals of Clochemerle (for Clochemerle in 1937), The Wicked Village (Clochemerle-Babylone, 1956) and (Clochemerle-les-Bains, 1965).

His novel La Peur (Fear) published in 1930 drew upon his own experiences and formed a damning indictment of the war; although the author's attitude became an example of "the standard version of World War I", it was shocking to the post-war society of France. It was not published in English until 2011. New York Times reviewed the novel in 2014 as "unadorned yet memorable" and "savagely frank", "radioactive with pure terror".

Others translated into English include Sainte Colline (1937), Cherry (Ma Petite Amie Pomme, 1940), The Affairs of Flavie or The Euffe Inheritance (Les Héritiers Euffe, 1945) and Mascarade (1948).

Other books in French include Clarisse Vernon, Propre à Rien, Chemins de Solitude and Le Petit Général.
