= Villefranche-sur-Saône =

Villefranche-sur-Saône Velafranche (Arpitan)
- Subprefecture and commune
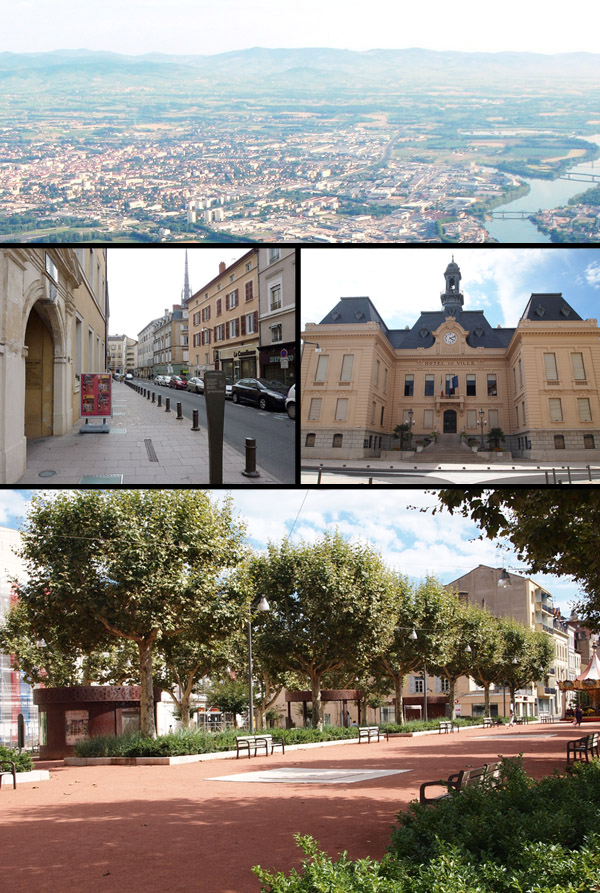
- A general view of Villefranche-sur-Saône

- Coat of arms
- Location of Villefranche-sur-Saône
- Location within France Location within Auvergne-Rhône-Alpes
- Coordinates: 45°59′00″N 4°43′00″E
- Country: France
- Region: Auvergne-Rhône-Alpes
- Department: Rhône
- Arrondissement: Villefranche-sur-Saône
- Canton: Villefranche-sur-Saône
- Intercommunality: CA Villefranche Beaujolais Saône

Government
  - Mayor (2020–2026): Thomas Ravier (UDI)
- Area^{1}: 9.48 km^{2} (3.66 sq mi)
- Population (2023): 36,172
  - Density: 3,820/km^{2} (9,880/sq mi)
- Demonym: Caladois
- Time zone: UTC+01:00 (CET)
  - Summer (DST): UTC+02:00 (CEST)
- INSEE/Postal code: 69264 /69400
- Website: www.villefranche.net
- ^{1} French Land Register data, which excludes lakes, ponds, glaciers > 1 km^{2} (0.386 sq mi or 247 acres) and river estuaries.

Villefranche-sur-Saône (US: /ˌviːl(ə)ˈfrɒ̃ʃ sʊər ˈsoʊn/; French: [vilfʁɑ̃ʃ syʁ son]; Arpitan: Velafranche) is a commune in the Rhône department in central-eastern France. It is the capital of the historical province of Beaujolais and Rhône's sole subprefecture.

Its city centre lies 1 mile (1.6 km) west of the river Saône, and is around 25 kilometres (16 mi) north of Lyon. In 2023 the commune had a population of 36,172. Its inhabitants are called Caladois (masculine) and Caladoises (feminine) in French. Its name translates into "Free City on Saône" in Old French.

== History ==
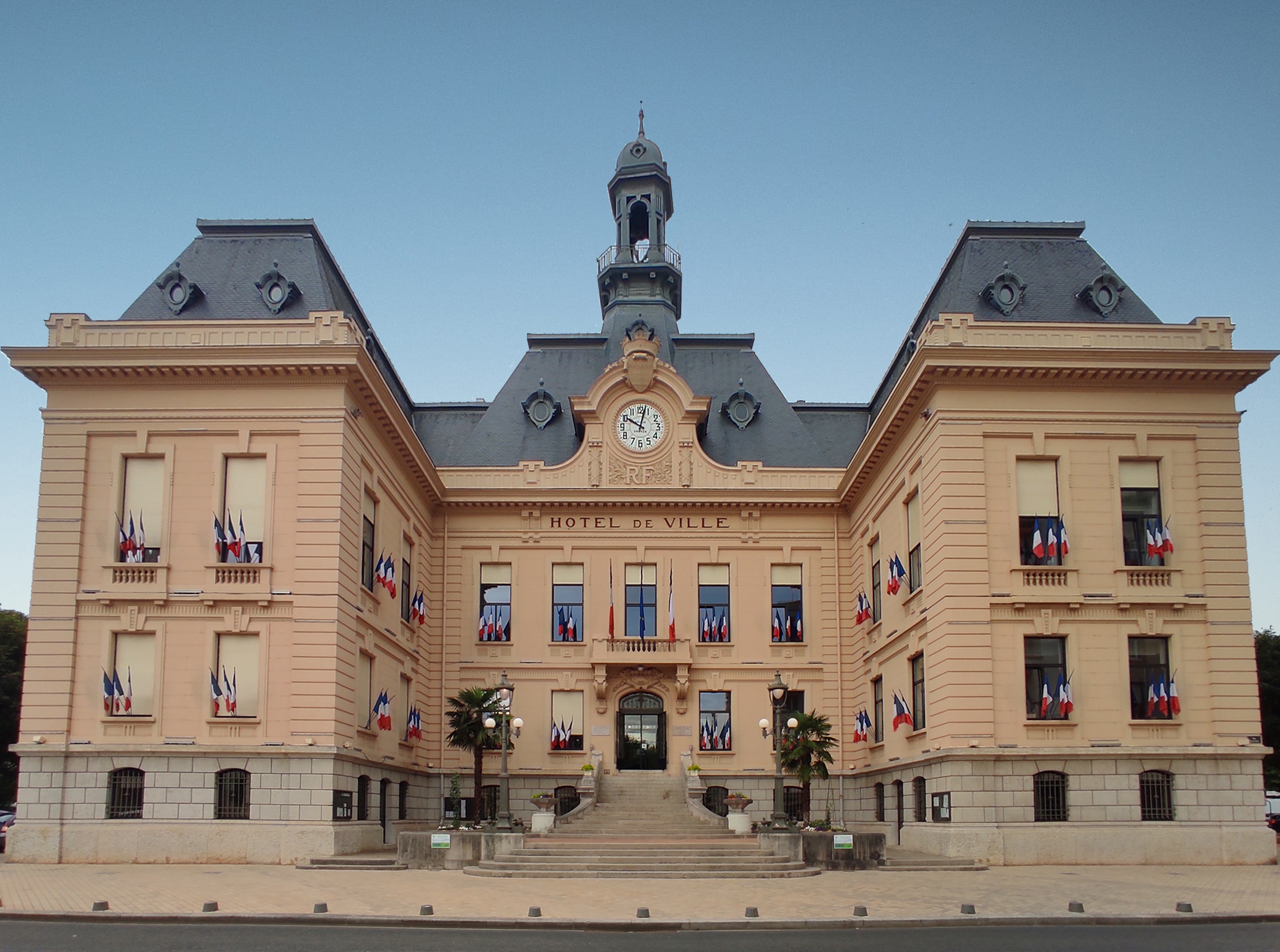
The Hôtel de Ville

Villefranche-sur-Saône was founded in 1212 by Guichard IV, count of Beaujeu (Arpitan: Bôjor/Biôjœr), and became in the 14th century the capital of the Beaujolais (Arpitan: Biôjolês) province. It endured three sieges in the 15th and 16th centuries. The town walls were taken down early in the 19th century. The Hôtel de Ville was completed in 1928.

== Population ==
The population data in the table and graph below refer to the commune of Villefranche-sur-Saône proper, in its geography at the given years. The commune of Villefranche-sur-Saône absorbed the former communes of Béligny and Ouilly (partly) in 1853.

Historical population

Year	Pop.	±% p.a.
1793	4,706	—
1800	4,374	−1.04%
1806	5,095	+2.58%
1821	5,250	+0.20%
1831	6,460	+2.10%
1836	7,533	+3.12%
1841	6,848	−1.89%
1846	7,064	+0.62%
1851	7,769	+1.92%
1856	11,686	+8.51%
1861	11,650	−0.06%
1866	12,469	+1.37%
1872	12,170	−0.40%
1876	12,485	+0.64%
1881	13,074	+0.93%
1886	12,518	−0.87%
1891	12,928	+0.65%
1896	13,627	+1.06%
1901	14,793	+1.66%

Year	Pop.	±% p.a.
1906	16,031	+1.62%
1911	16,388	+0.44%
1921	16,588	+0.12%
1926	17,339	+0.89%
1931	18,188	+0.96%
1936	18,871	+0.74%
1946	20,017	+0.59%
1954	21,703	+1.02%
1962	24,516	+1.54%
1968	26,338	+1.20%
1975	30,341	+2.04%
1982	28,881	−0.70%
1990	29,542	+0.28%
1999	30,647	+0.41%
2007	33,840	+1.25%
2012	36,241	+1.38%
2017	36,857	+0.34%
2023	36,172	−0.31%

Source: EHESS and INSEE (1968–2023)

== Economy ==
Industries include wine-trading, metallurgy, textiles, and chemicals.

== Transport ==
The Autoroute du Sud (the principal road from Paris to the south of France) is adjacent to the east of the town, running alongside the Saône.

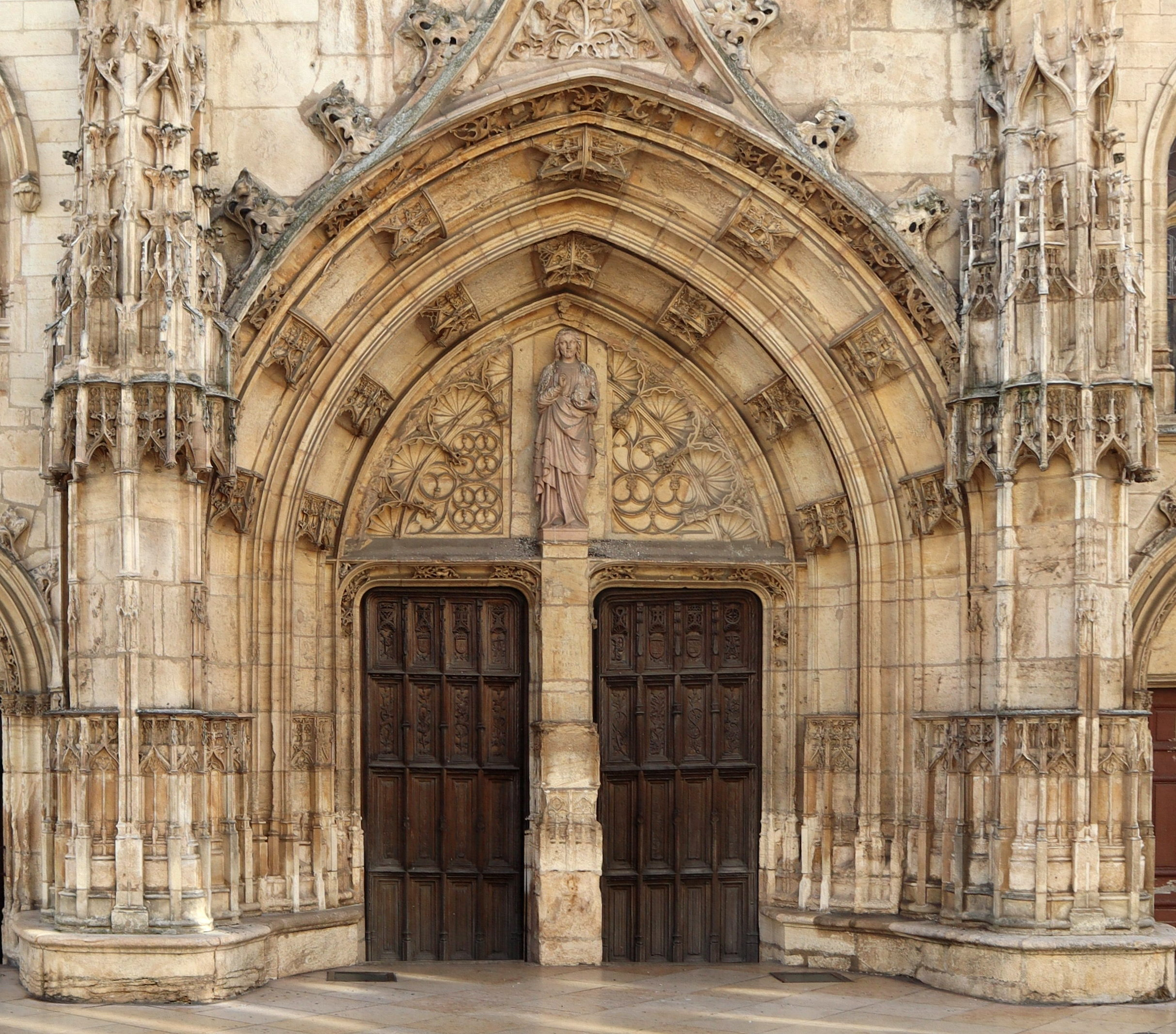
Portal of Notre-Dame des Marais

== Buildings ==
The church of Notre-Dame des Marais, begun at the end of the 14th and finished in the 16th century, has a tower and spire (rebuilt in 1862), standing to the right of the 15th century façade, in which are carved wooden doors.

== Sport ==
FC Villefranche Beaujolais is based in the town.

== Notable people ==
- Pierre Teilhard de Chardin (1881–1955), Jesuit priest and scientist, attended school here in 1892–1897
- Maurice Baquet (1911–2005), actor and cellist
- François Picard (1921–1996), racing driver
- Christian Lavieille (born 1965), racing driver
- Benjamin Biolay (born 1973), singer, songwriter and musician
- Coralie Clément (born 1978), singer
- Grégory Bettiol (born 1986), footballer

== Twin towns – sister cities ==
Villefranche-sur-Saône is twinned with:

- Bertinoro, Italy
- Bühl, Germany
- Călărași District, Moldova
- Kandi, Benin
- Schkeuditz, Germany

== Climate ==
Climate data for Villefranche-sur-Saône (1991–2020 normals, extremes 1934–present)
Month	Jan	Feb	Mar	Apr	May	Jun	Jul	Aug	Sep	Oct	Nov	Dec	Year
Record high °C (°F)	19.1 (66.4)	23.1 (73.6)	27.7 (81.9)	32.0 (89.6)	40.0 (104.0)	41.0 (105.8)	43.5 (110.3)	43.0 (109.4)	36.0 (96.8)	31.6 (88.9)	23.3 (73.9)	19.9 (67.8)	43.5 (110.3)
Mean daily maximum °C (°F)	7.6 (45.7)	9.6 (49.3)	14.4 (57.9)	18.4 (65.1)	22.6 (72.7)	26.7 (80.1)	28.8 (83.8)	28.5 (83.3)	23.8 (74.8)	18.1 (64.6)	11.6 (52.9)	8.0 (46.4)	18.2 (64.8)
Daily mean °C (°F)	4.2 (39.6)	5.3 (41.5)	9.0 (48.2)	12.5 (54.5)	16.7 (62.1)	20.5 (68.9)	22.5 (72.5)	22.0 (71.6)	17.9 (64.2)	13.4 (56.1)	8.0 (46.4)	4.8 (40.6)	13.1 (55.6)
Mean daily minimum °C (°F)	0.9 (33.6)	1.0 (33.8)	3.6 (38.5)	6.6 (43.9)	10.8 (51.4)	14.3 (57.7)	16.2 (61.2)	15.5 (59.9)	12.0 (53.6)	8.6 (47.5)	4.4 (39.9)	1.6 (34.9)	8.0 (46.4)
Record low °C (°F)	−21.9 (−7.4)	−19.0 (−2.2)	−11.5 (11.3)	−5.0 (23.0)	−0.8 (30.6)	3.7 (38.7)	4.9 (40.8)	5.0 (41.0)	0.5 (32.9)	−4.9 (23.2)	−8.5 (16.7)	−16.2 (2.8)	−21.9 (−7.4)
Average precipitation mm (inches)	48.3 (1.90)	37.9 (1.49)	46.9 (1.85)	62.6 (2.46)	73.5 (2.89)	73.6 (2.90)	77.1 (3.04)	71.0 (2.80)	68.2 (2.69)	89.9 (3.54)	88.4 (3.48)	53.5 (2.11)	790.9 (31.14)
Average precipitation days (≥ 1.0 mm)	9.2	8.2	8.5	9.1	10.3	8.4	8.1	8.0	7.0	9.8	10.2	9.9	106.8
Source: Meteociel

== See also ==
- Communes of the Rhône department
