= Paul Guth =

French humorist, journalist and writer

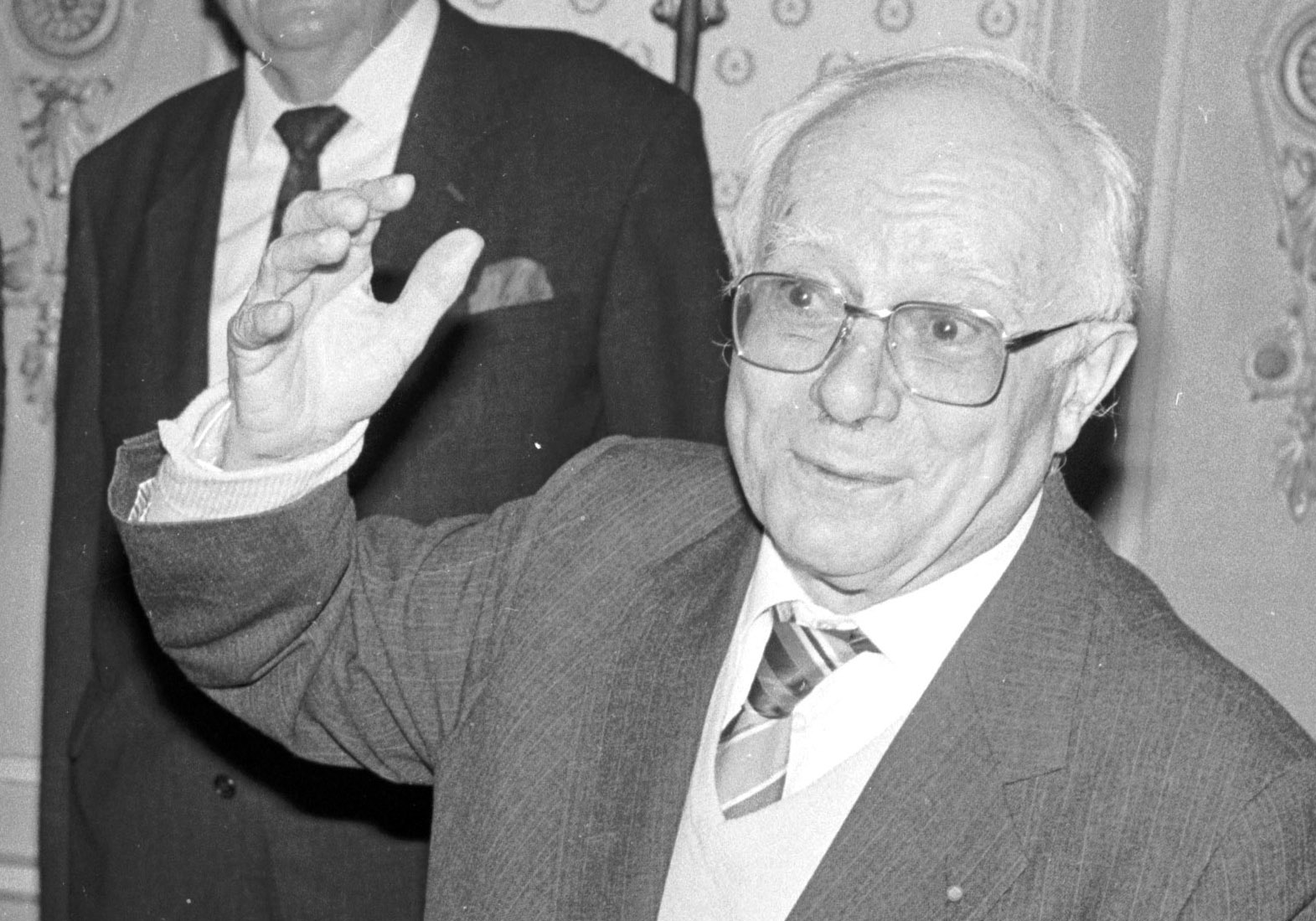
- Born: 5 March 1910
- Died: 29 October 1997 (aged 87)
- Occupation: Writer

Paul Guth (5 March 1910 – 29 October 1997) was a French humorist, journalist and writer, and the President of the Académie des provinces françaises.

A novelist, essayist, columnist, memoirist, historian, pamphleteer, he distinguished himself in every genre with a combination of sensitivity and savagery. He wrote about fifty works on various subjects, ranging from straight history to personal anecdotes, never holding back in criticism of contemporary failings.

== Life ==
=== Early years ===
Paul Guth was born in Ossun on 5 March 1910 to a family of modest means. His parents used to live in Villeneuve-sur-Lot, but his mother, a bigourdane, gave birth to him at her family's hometown of Ossun, in the canton of Hautes-Pyrénées.

Guth began his education at Villeneuve-sur-Lot. He studied literature at the Lycee Louis-Le Grand in Paris, where he graduated with distinction in his agrégation in 1933, and pursued an ordinary academic career until the Second World War. He was a teacher for ten years at schools in Dijon and Rouen, as well as at Janson de Sailly in Paris.

=== Literary success ===
After the war, Guth devoted himself to literature and journalism, including radio. He won the Prix du Théâtre in 1946 for Fugues.

In 1953, Guth published Les Mémoires d'un Naïf ("The Memoirs of a Naïf"), a bestseller which was to be the first in a series of seven volumes. It tells the story of the Naïf ("Simpleton"), a teacher of French who hides a grandiose imagination beneath a naïve exterior. The series comprises Les Mémoires d'un Naïf (1953 – Prix Courteline), Le Naïf aux quarante enfants ("Forty Kids and a Naïf", 1955), Le Naïf locataire ("The Naïf as Lodger", 1956 –awarded the prestigious Grand prix du roman de l'Académie française), Le Naïf sous les drapeaux ("Naïf at Arms", 1964), Le mariage du Naïf ("The Naïf's Wedding", 1965), Le Naïf amoureux ("The Naïf in Love", 1968) and finally Saint Naïf (1970).

The works of Paul Guth include a romantic four-volume series, Jeanne la Mince, published between 1960 and 1969: Jeanne la mince, Jeanne la mince à Paris, Jeanne la mince et l'amour, and Jeanne la mince et la jalousie. This series is told in the first person by a (fictional) young woman, Jeanne la Mince, who grows up in a provincial town in the southwest of France in the years before World War I. In the early 1920s, she leaves that narrow but secure world behind when she goes to Paris and gradually adapts to the very different life there, centering for her and her female compatriots on art, fashion, Dada, dancing, and love affairs. She spends many dissipated years in Paris, and completes her sentimental education before finding love (and jealousy) in the arms of the journalist Paul Bagnac.

=== Later career ===
Occupied for 12 years with historical writing, Guth returned to novels in 1977 with Le Chat Beauté (a pun on "Puss-in-Boots", Le Chat botté). In this book, he takes stock of himself, his relationships with others, and his life. The same year, he published Notre drôle d'époque comme si vous y étiez ("Those Funny Times of Ours; As If You Were There"), a characteristically sarcastic and politically conservative collection of anecdotes about TV, love, religion and many other topics, in which he invites the readers to smile at their own habits and way of life.

In 1978, he wrote Lettres à votre fils qui en a ras le bol ("Letters to your Fed-Up Son"), a "love-letter" to the new generation, praising their cheerfulness in the face of adversity. He systematically broached topical issues: relationships with the past and future, school life, tobacco, hi-fi, sex, coming of age at 18, homosexuality, speeding, drugs, unemployment, manual work, girls, and love. Three years later, his Lettre ouverte aux futurs illettrés ("Open Letter to Illiterates to Be") returns to the same theme, expressing admiration for the young people he had taught, while blaming a poor school system for their subsequent disadvantaged position.

In 1978 he was awarded the Grand prix de Littérature de l'Académie Française for his Collected Works.

Guth also helped develop books for children, including Les Passagers de la Grande Ourse ("The Passengers of Ursa Major", 1944) with Paul Grimault, which tells the story of Gô and his little dog Sniff on board an airship.

For several years, he researched and wrote historical novels such as Moi, Joséphine, impératrice ("I, Empress Joséphine") and then, in 1992, published Histoire de la littérature française ("History of French Literature"), in which he attempted "to explain, as an author, the process of artistic creation" while retaining a "sense of wonder". He tries to adopt the point of view of a "contemporary of each author" and stopping at the "threshold of the living", "the blood-dripping dawn of the 20th century."

In 1988, Guth attacked a section of the Left in Oui, le bonheur ("Yes, Happiness"), where he explored passions, indignations, and recipes for happiness.

Finally, in 1994, after a literary career spanning five decades, he put on the mantle of a philosopher (and ruthless observer) to write down his thoughts in Qu'en pensez-vous? ("What Do You Think About it?"). Guth died in October 1997 in Ville-d'Avray.

== Novels ==
- 1944: Les Passagers de la Grande Ourse ("The Passengers of Ursa Major")
- 1947: Quarante contre un ("Forty Versus One")
- 1953: Mémoires d'un naïf ("Memoirs of a Naïf")
- 1955: Le Naïf aux quarante enfants ("Forty Kids and a Naïf")
- 1956: Le Naïf locataire ("The Naïf as Lodger") translated as the Innocent Tenant: Jonathan Cape: London, 1957 – Grand Prix du roman de l'Académie française
- 1960: Jeanne la mince ("Jeanne la Mince" or "Skinny Jeanne")
- 1961: Jeanne la mince à Paris ("Jeanne la Mince in Paris")
- 1962: Jeanne la mince et l'amour ("Jeanne la Mince and Love")
- 1964: Le naïf sous les drapeaux ("The Naïf at Arms")
- 1965: Le mariage du naïf ("The Naïf's Wedding")
- 1968: Le Naïf amoureux ("The Naïf in Love")
- 1969: Jeanne la mince et la jalousie ("Jeanne la Mince and Jealousy")
- 1970: Saint naïf ("Saint Naïf")
- 1972: Les sept trompettes ("The Seven Trumpets")
- 1972: Mazarin
- 1977: Notre drôle d'époque comme si vous y étiez ("Our Joke of an Age, If You Were There")
- 1977: Le chat Beauté ("Puss-in-Boots")
- 1978: Lettres à votre fils qui en a ras le bol ("Letters to Your Fed-Up Son")
- 1980: Lettre ouverte aux futurs illettrés ("Open Letter to an Illiterate Future")
- 1980: Moi, Joséphine, impératrice ("I, Empress Joséphine")
- 1984: Un petit Lillois de Paris : Charles de Gaulle
- 1985: La Tigresse ("The She-Tiger")
- 1985: Une enfance pour la vie ("A Childhood for Life")
- 1987: Si j'étais le Bon Dieu ("If I Were the Good Lord")
- 1988: Oui, le bonheur ("Yes, Happiness")
- 1989: Autour des dames du bois de Boulogne ("The Making of Les dames du Bois de Boulogne")
- 1992: Histoire de la littérature française ("History of French Literature")
- 1993: Petite vie de Saint Louis ("Short Life of St Louis")
- 1994: Qu'en pensez-vous? ("But What Do You Think?")

Unknown dates of publication

- La chance ("Luck")
- Fugues
- Lettre ouverte aux idoles ("Open Letter to the Idols")
- Le retour de Barbe Bleue ("The Return of Bluebeard")
