= Germain David-Nillet =

French painter (1861–1932)

Germain David-Nillet who was a French painter. He was born on 4 December 1861 in Paris and died on 12 October 1932 in Paris.

== Biography ==
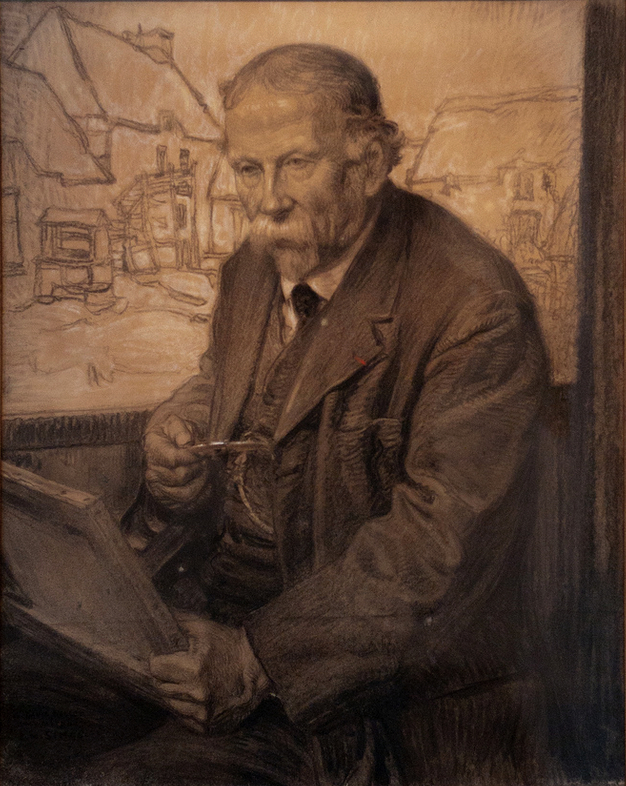
Portrait of Germain David-Nillet by Eugène Martial Simas in the Musée du Faouët

He was a pupil of Léon Lhermitte. He exhibited at the Paris Salon in 1889 receiving an honourable mention and was elected to the Salon in 1895 ("Sociétaire"). He was awarded a silver medal at the great Paris Exposition universelle of 1900 and was made a Chevalier de la Légion d'honneur. He also won a gold medal in Munich in 1892, received an honourable mention in Madrid in 1893, and gold medals in Rouen in 1897 and Amsterdam in 1899. In 1934 the Salon of the Société nationale des beaux-arts staged a retrospective exhibition of his work. He was a "genre" painter. He met with Maurice Denis whilst in Saint-Brieuc.

== Works ==
Paintings by David-Nillet include-

- "Autoportrait de face, barbe et moustache". This work is held by the Paris Musée du Louvre département des Arts.
- "Calvaire de Tronoen (Morbihan)". This work is held in Nantes' Musée des beaux-arts.
- "Façade de la cathédrale de Rouen, 1ère étude". This work is held in Rouen's Musée des beaux-arts.
- "Façade de la cathédrale de Rouen. 2ème étude". This work is held in Rouen's Musée des beaux-arts.
- "La Cathedral de Chartres". This work is held in Rouen's Musée des beaux-arts.
- "La Cathedral de Rouen". This work is held in Rouen's Musée des beaux-arts.
- "Le Jube de la Chapelle Saint Fiacre au Faouët". This work is held in Rouen's Musée des beaux-arts.
- "Le Labourer et Ses Enfants". This work is held in the Le Puy-en-Velay Musée Crozatier.
- "Le nouvea Ne". This work is held in Troyes' Musée d'art d'archéologie et de sciences naturelles.
- "Leon Lhermitte". This work is held in the Musée d'Orsay.
- "Les grandes Arbres". This work is held in Anger's Musée des beaux-arts.
- "La Veuve". This work is held in Pau's Musée des beaux-arts.
- "La soupe". This work is held in Paris' Musée du Louvre département des Arts graphiques.
- "La visite au malade". This work is held in Paris' Musée du Louvre département des Arts graphiques.
- "Le Bénédicité". This work is held in Nantes' Musée des beaux-arts.
- "Maternite, Bretonne allaitant son Enfants". This work is held in Rouen's Musée des beaux-arts.
- "Oliviers à Cagnes (Var)". This work is held in Nantes' Musée des beaux-arts.
- "Portail de l'Eglise de Caudebec". This work is held in Rouen's Tribunal de Commerce.
- "Peines de la vie". This work is held in Paris' Musée du Louvre département des Arts graphiques.
- "Place du Faouet, le soir". This work is held in Nantes' Musée des beaux-arts.
- "Vieille Femme Priant". This work is held in the Musée d'Orsay.
- "Vieille femme priant, assise devant une fenêtre". This work is held in Paris' Musée du Louvre département des Arts graphiques.

== Paintings depicting churches ==
- "Eglise Saint-Germain-l'Auxerrois". This painting is held in the Issoire Mairie.
- "Eglise Saint-Bonnet à Bourges". This painting is held by the Ministère des postes in Paris.

== Gallery ==
Some of David-Nillet's works are shown below.

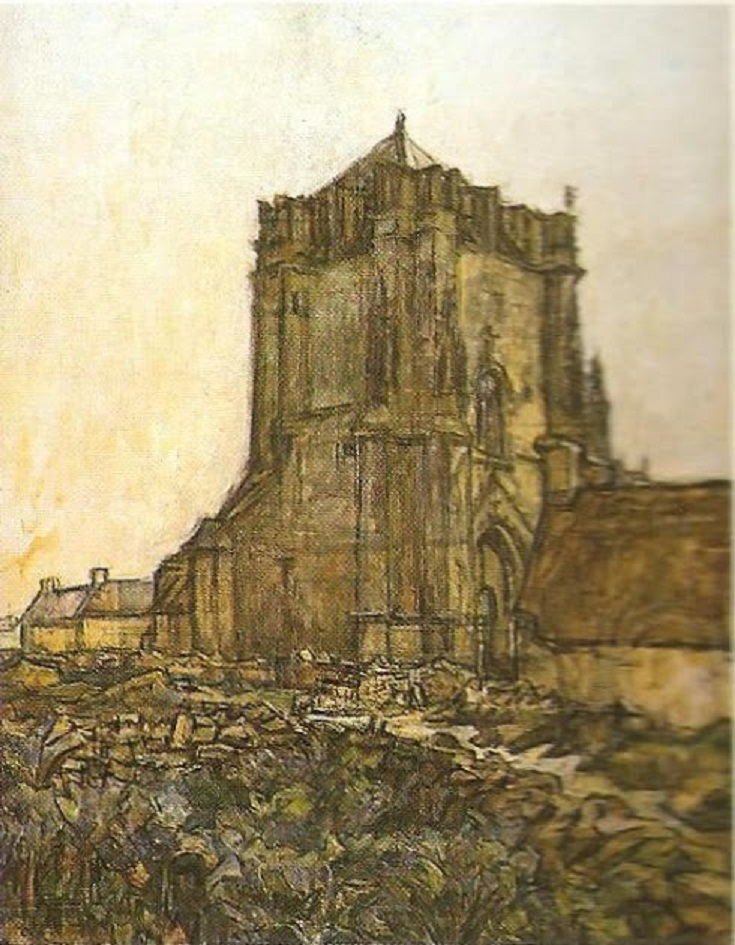
Germain David-Nillet's "La Tour carrée". Can be seen in Saint-Guénolé in Penmarc'h.

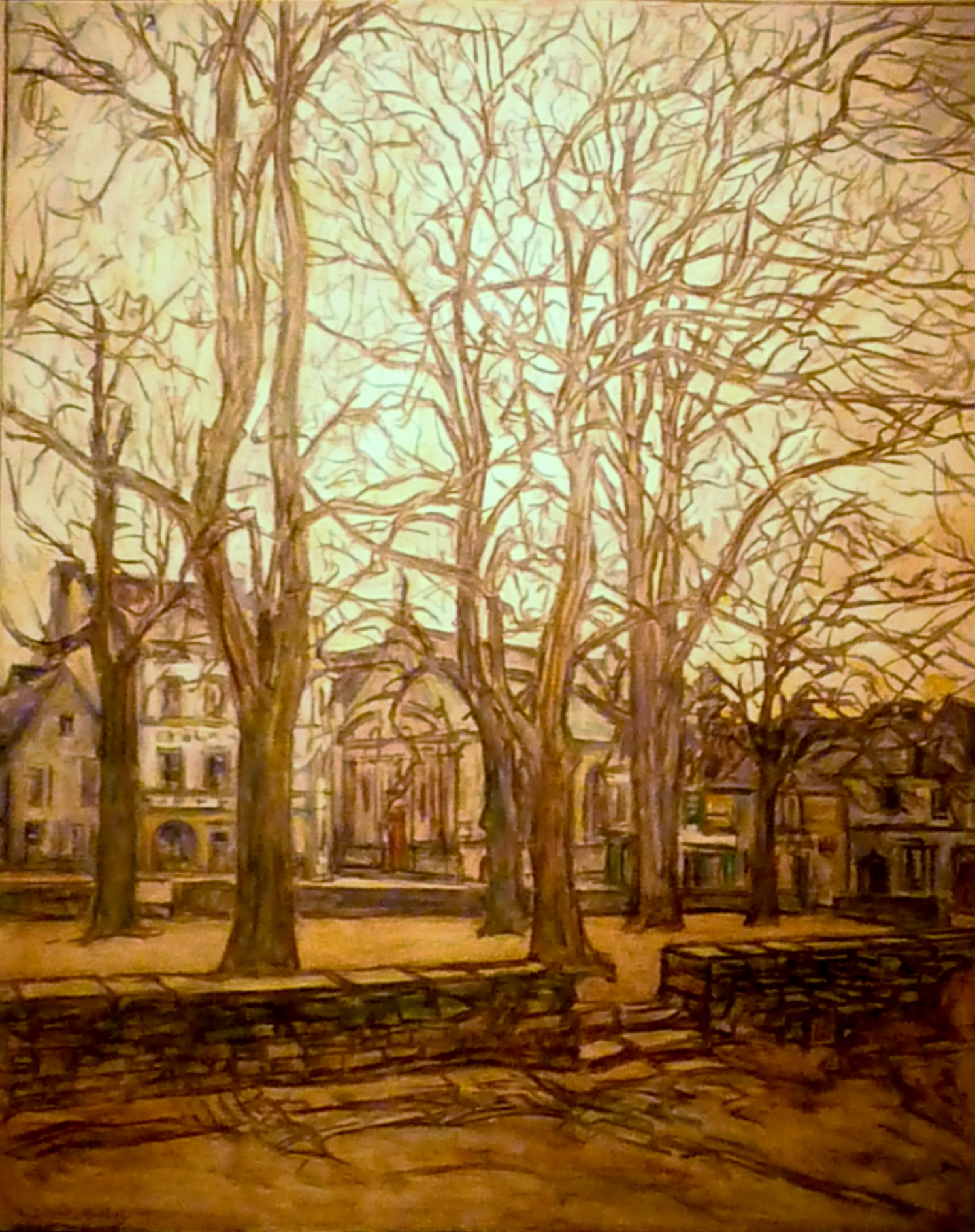
Germain David-Nillet's "La place plantée". This oil on canvas is held in the Musée du Faouët.

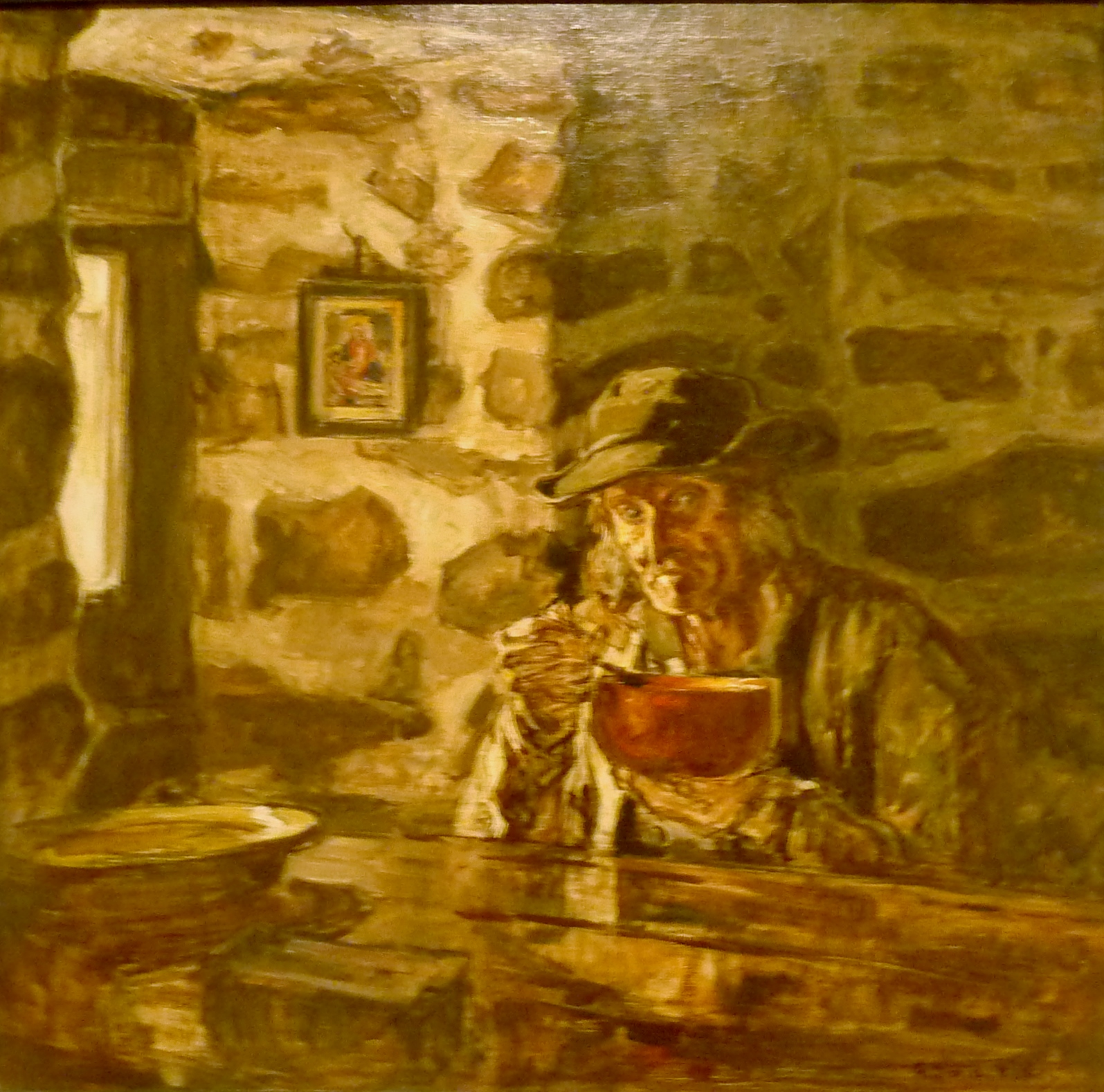
Germain David-Nillet's "Un vieux chouan" or "Breton à table" Painted around 1906, this oil on canvas is held in the Musée du Faouët.

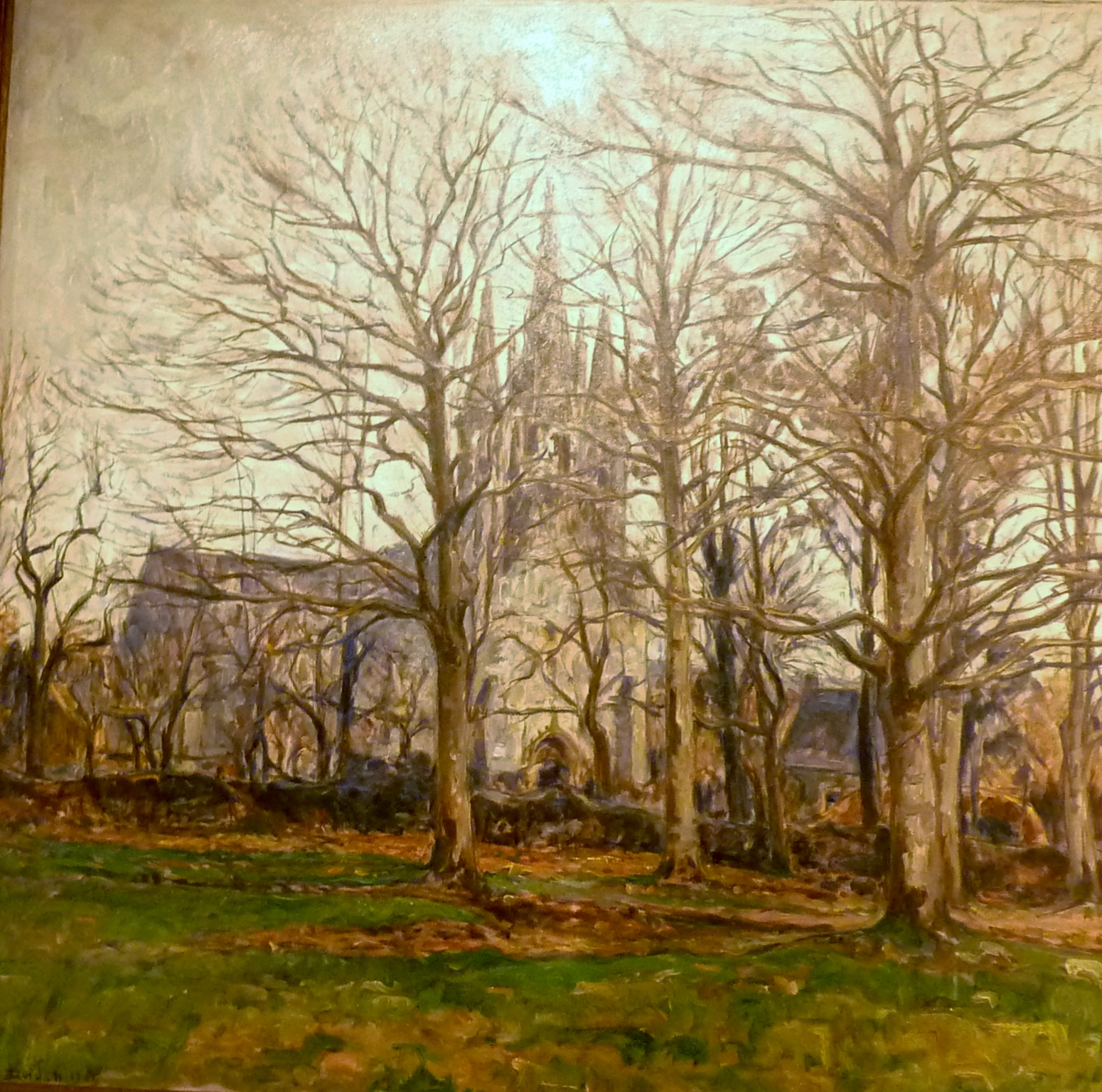
Germain David-Nillet's "Chapelle Saint-Fiacre". Painted in 1908 this oil on canvas is held in the Musée du Faouët.

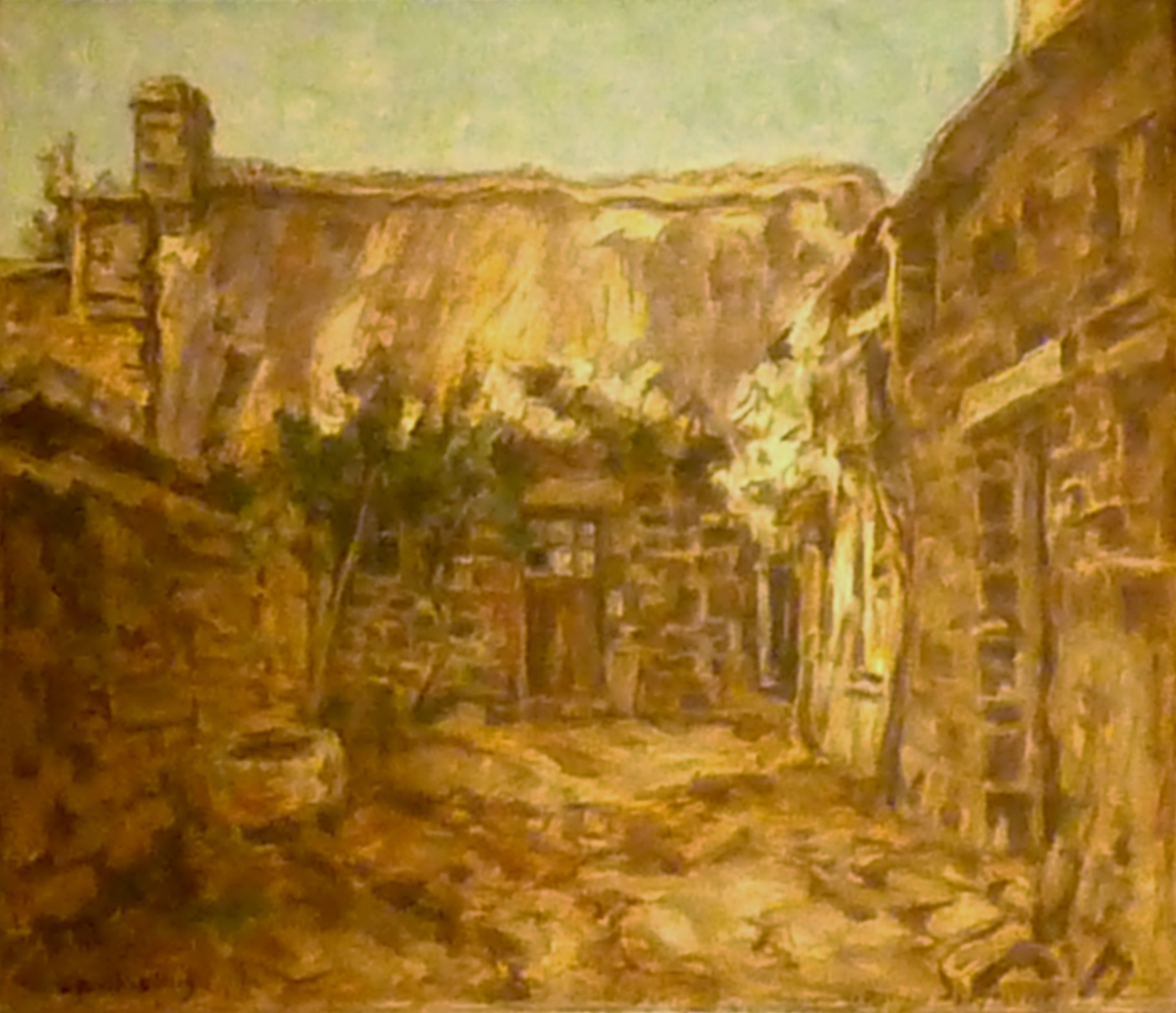
Germain David-Nillet's "La maison de Marion du Faouët". This oil on canvas dates to around 1913 and is held in the Musée du Faouët.

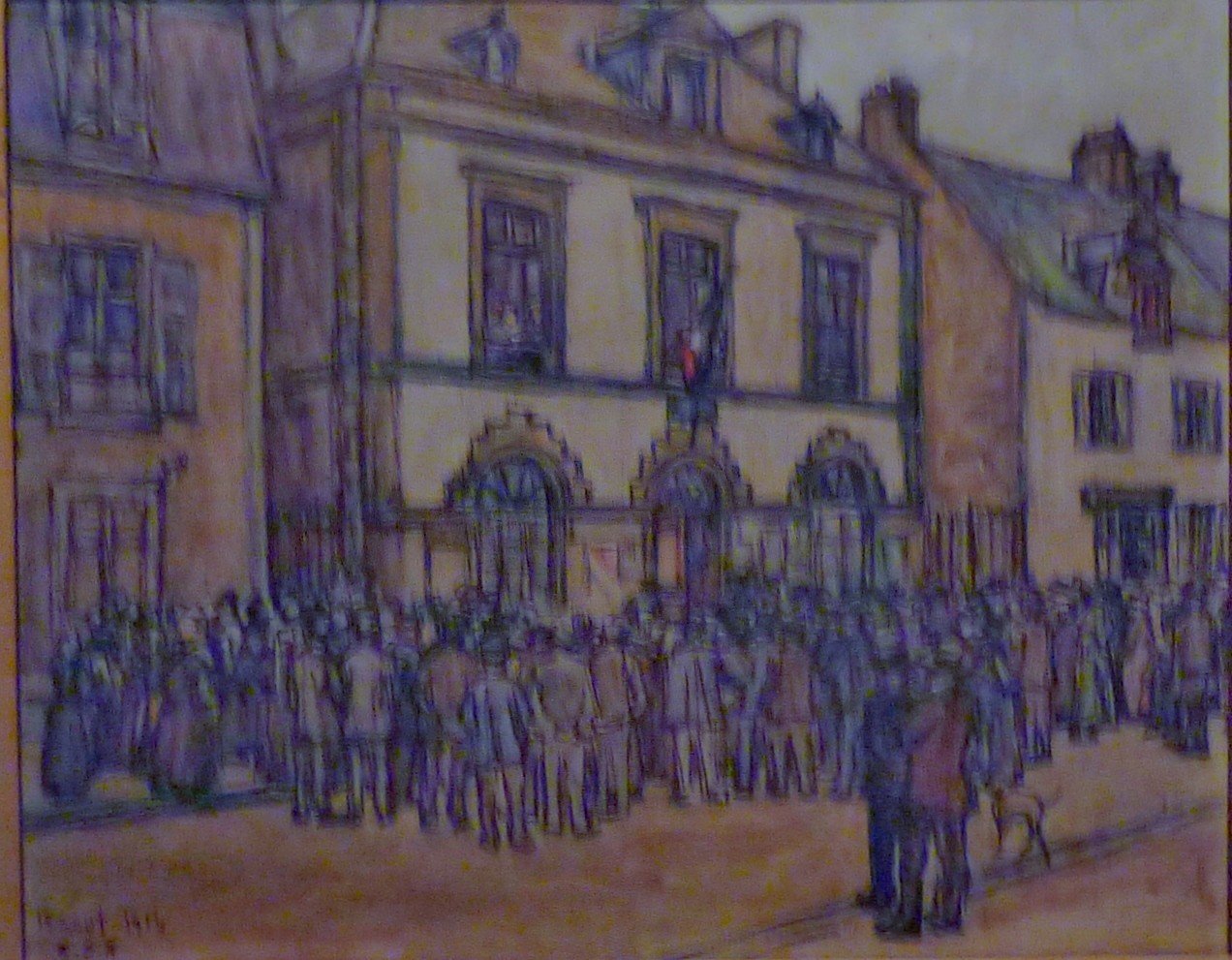
Germain David-Nillet's "Rassemblement devant la mairie du Faouët". Held in the Musée du Faouët.

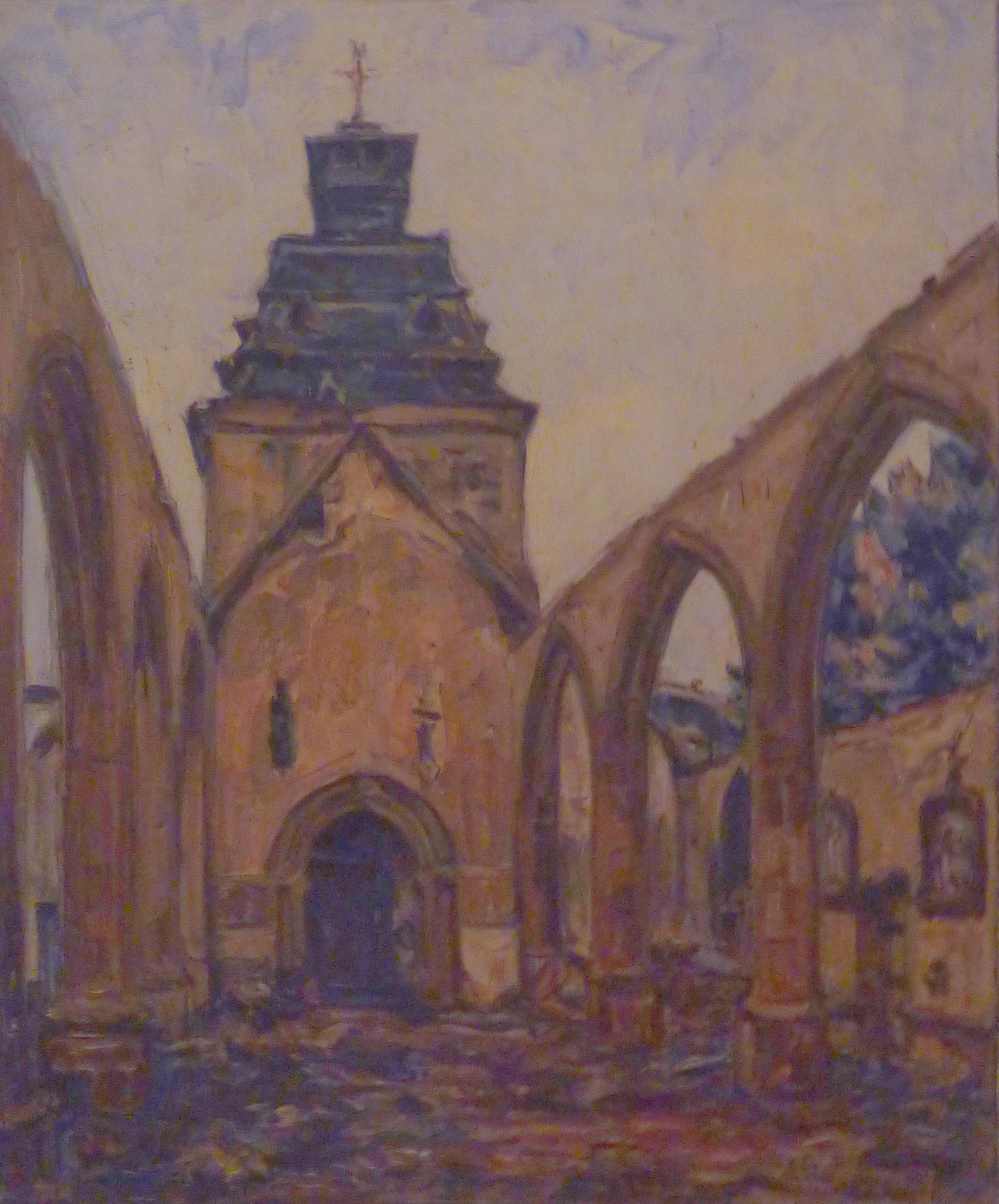
Germain David-Nillet's "L'église du Faouët après l'incendie, vue du clocher". Dates to 1917. Held in the parish of Faouët's collection.

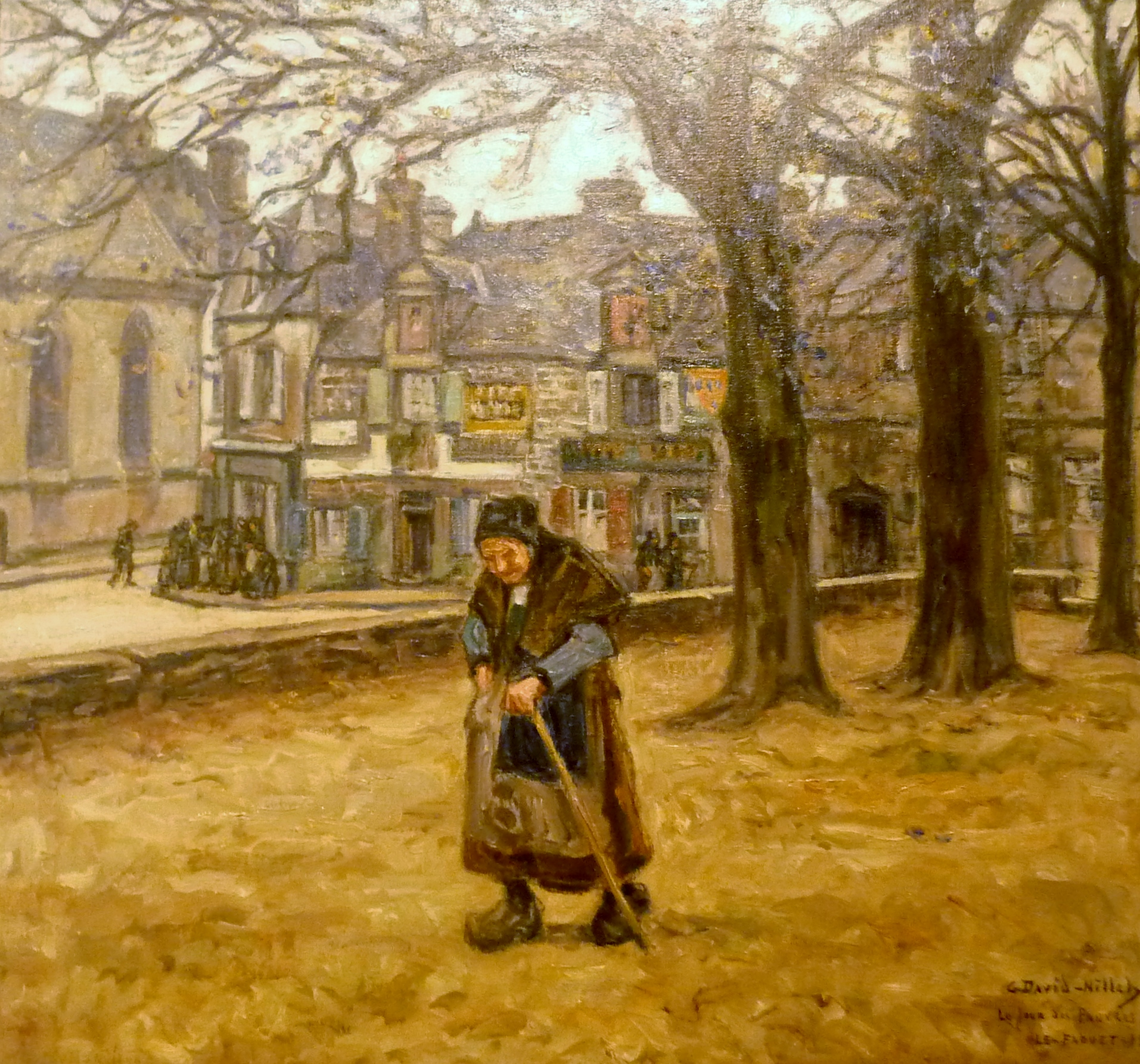
Germain David-Nillet's "Le jour des pauvres". A 1920 painting held by the Musée du Faouët.

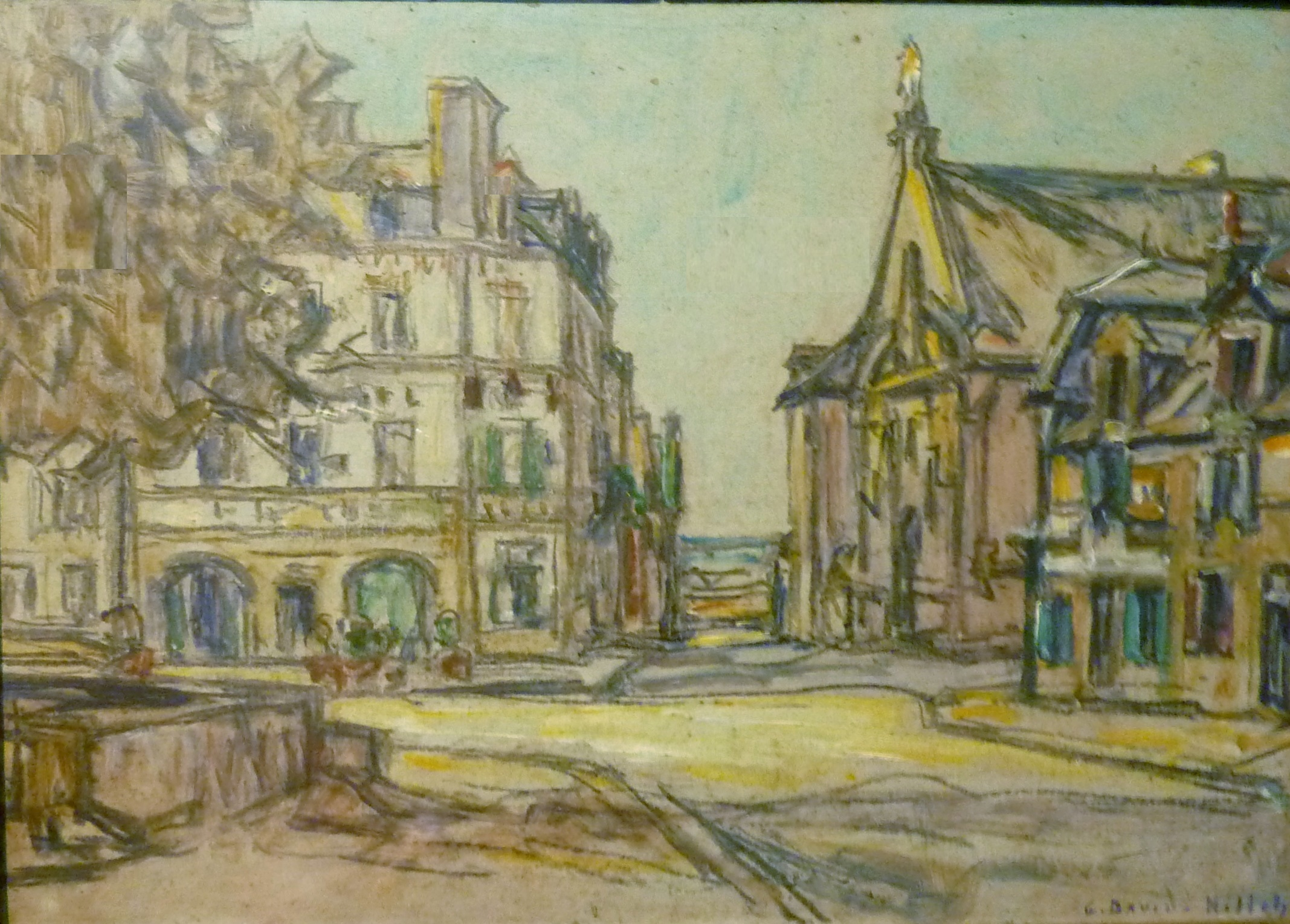
Germain David-Nillet's "La Chapelle des Ursulines et l'Hôtel du Lion d'Or". Held in the Musée du Faouët.

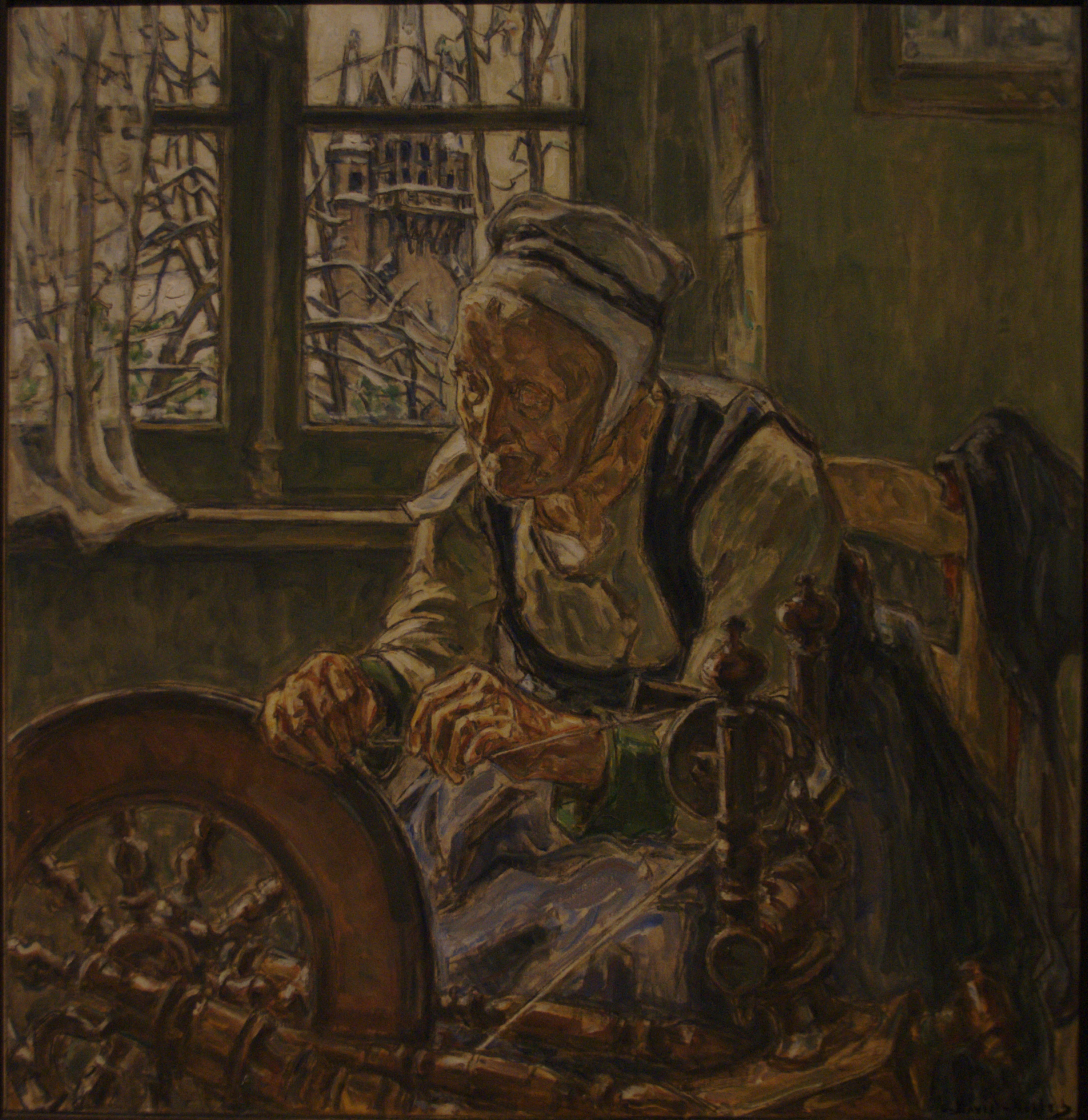
Germain David-Nillet's "Le fil cassé".

== See also ==
Some photographs of David-Nillet's work.
