= Beaujolais (province) =

Region of France

Coordinates: 46°05′N 04°40′E

Beaujolais (French pronunciation: [boʒɔlɛ]; Arpitan: Biôjolês) is a historical province and wine-producing region in France. It is located north of Lyon, and covers parts of the departments of Rhône and Saône-et-Loire. The region is known internationally for its long tradition of winemaking, and more recently for the Beaujolais nouveau.

== Geography ==
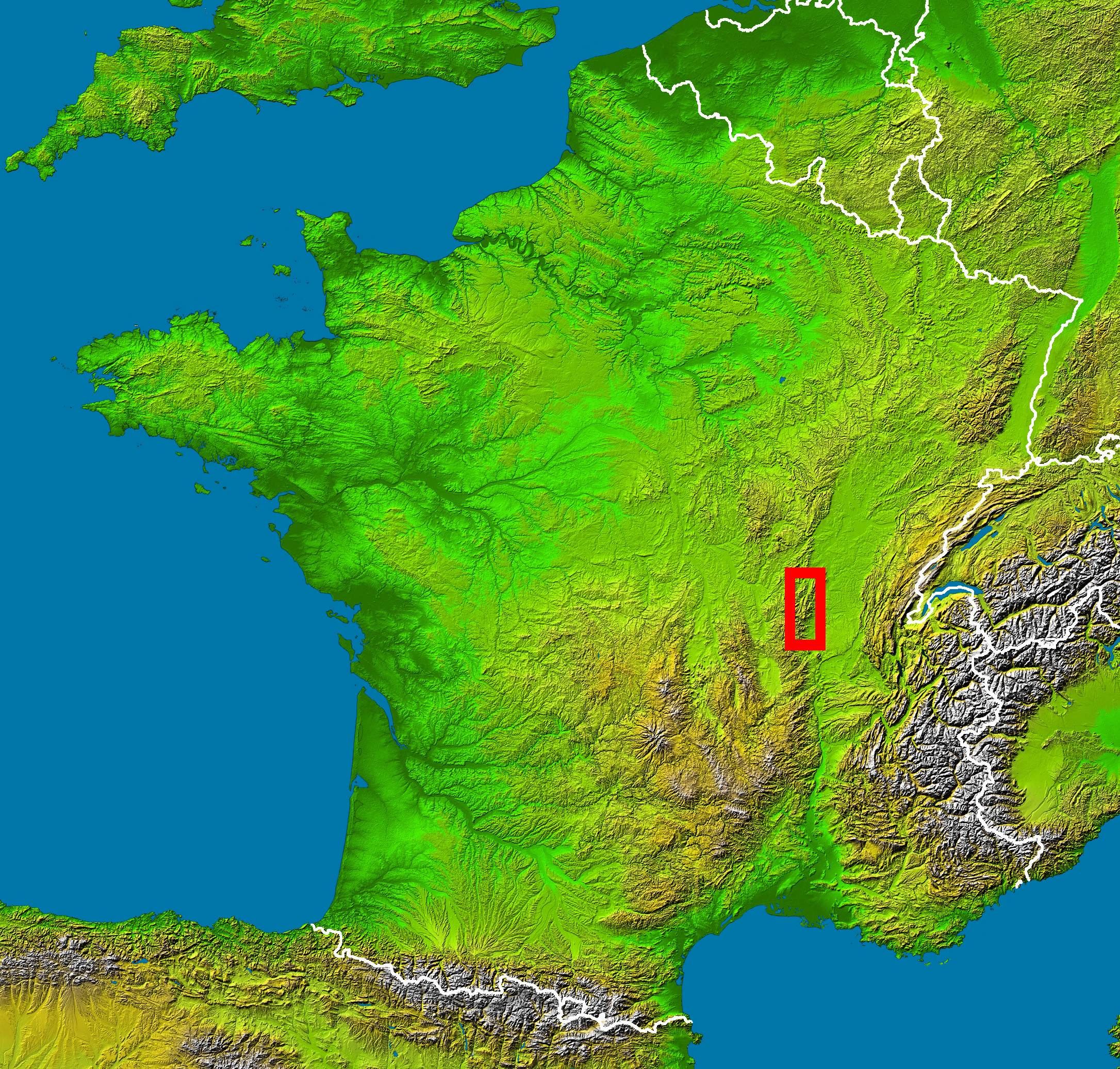
Beaujolais' location in France

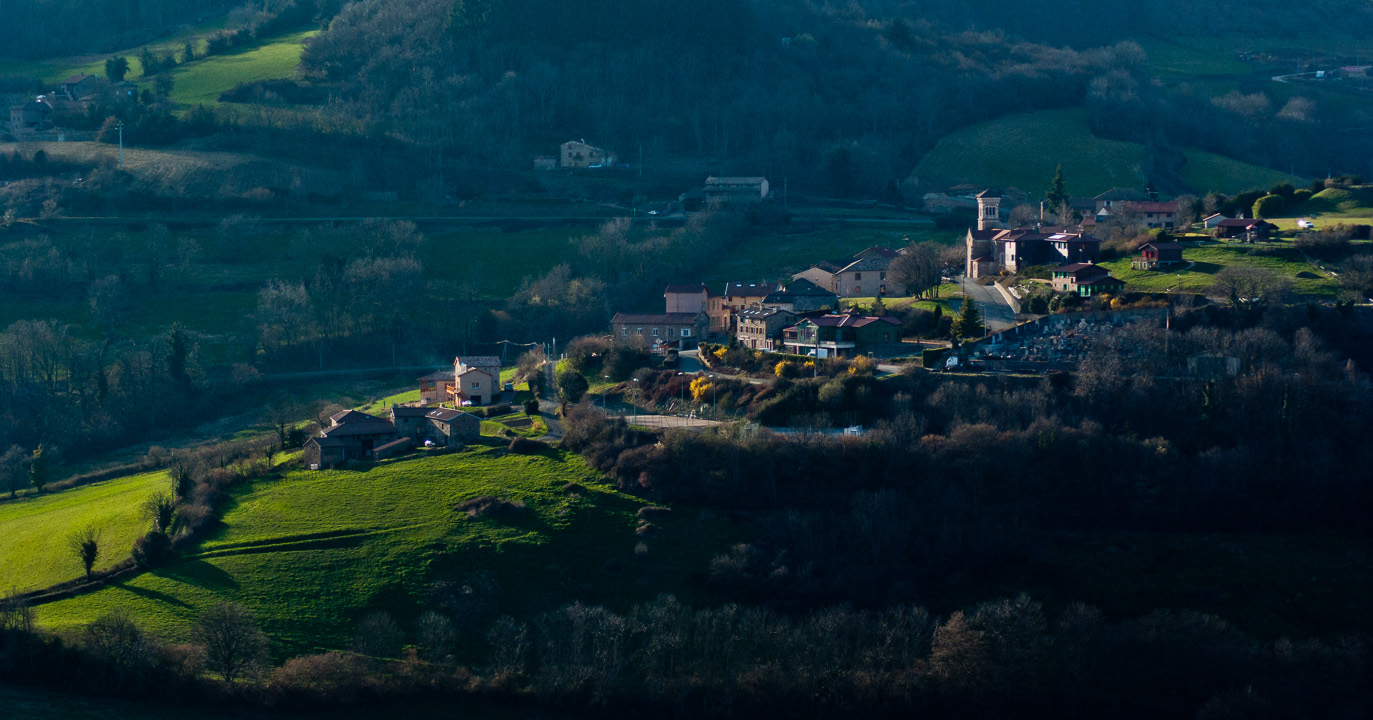
Beaujolais landscape

The historical capital of the province is Beaujeu (Arpitan: Bôjor / Biôjœr) and the economic capital of the area is Villefranche-sur-Saône (Velafranche).

== Wine ==
Almost all the wine produced in the region is red wine from the Gamay grape, of which the heavily marketed Beaujolais Nouveau is the most well-known, and the village crus the most prized.

== Notes and references ==
- Mathieu Méras, Le Beaujolais au Moyen Age, Lyon, 1956.
