= Roger Rabiniaux =

French writer and poet (1914–1986)

- Born: Roger Bellion; 3 December 1914; Levallois-Perret
- Died: 27 October 1986 (aged 71); Châtillon-sous-Bagneux
- Occupations: Writer; Poet

Roger Rabiniaux (3 December 1914 – 27 October 1986) was a French writer and poet.

== Biography ==
Rabiniaud was a pupil at the lycée of Fontainebleau and at Lycée Lakanal of Sceaux, Hauts-de-Seine.

A teacher after having studied literature and law, then public works official (1940–1942), he was an editor in the Office of the Secretary of State for Communications Jean Berthelot. He engaged into the Résistance and entered the prefectural administration of Vichy France in 1942.

He published poems in various literary magazines before publishing the five volumes of Un jeune homme des années trente - including Le Soleil des dortoirs - and manifested himself brilliantly in 1951 by publishing L'Honneur de Pédonzigue, a book sponsored by Maurice Nadeau, Jean Paulhan and Raymond Queneau.

He was a member of the Académie de l'humour, the Académie Rabelais, laureate of the Prix Guillaume Apollinaire for Les Faubourgs du ciel (1942), of the Prix Courteline for Les Enragées de Cornebourg (1957), and the Prix Sainte-Beuve for Le Soleil des dortoirs (1965).

== Works ==
- 1951: L'Honneur de Pédonzigue, preface by Raymond Queneau, Corréâ
- 1952: Les Vertus craboncrague, Éditions du Scorpion
- 1957: Les Enragées de Cornebourg, Buchet/Chastel
- 1958: Impossible d'être abject, Buchet/Chastel
- 1964: Les Rues de Levallois, Buchet/Chastel
- 1966: À la chaleur des hommes, Buchet/Chastel
- 1971: La Bataille de Saumur, Buchet-Chastel
- 1973: Les Bonheurs de la guerre, Buchet/Chastel
- 1978: La Fin de Pédonzigue, Simoën
