= The Blood Donor =

- Hancock episode
- Episode no.: Series 7 Episode 5
- Written by: Galton and Simpson
- Original air date: 23 June 1961
- Running time: 25 minutes

Episode chronology
← Previous "The Lift"	Next → "The Succession – Son and Heir"

"The Blood Donor" is an episode from the television comedy series Hancock, the final BBC series featuring British comedian Tony Hancock. First transmitted on 23 June 1961, the show was written by Ray Galton and Alan Simpson, and was produced by Duncan Wood. Supporting Hancock were Patrick Cargill, Hugh Lloyd, Frank Thornton, James Ottaway and June Whitfield. It remains one of the best known situation comedy episodes ever broadcast in the United Kingdom.

== Synopsis ==
Hancock arrives at his local hospital to give blood. "It was either that or join the Young Conservatives", he tells the Blood Donor Department's reception nurse (Whitfield), before getting into an argument with her about whether British blood is superior to other types. After managing to offend two other waiting donors, Hancock amuses himself by reading the waiting room's wall posters out loud, finally singing "Coughs and sneezes spread diseases" to the tune of the Deutschlandlied before being shown in to see Dr MacTaggart (Cargill), greeting him in a broad Scottish accent and taken aback when the doctor responds in an educated English accent – saying "We're not all Rob Roys."

After Dr. MacTaggart has taken a blood sample Hancock blithely assumes that that is all that is needed and prepares to depart. When the doctor tells him it was just a smear ("It may be just a smear to you mate, but that’s life and death to some poor wretch!") and that he must donate a pint of blood, he protests, "I don't mind giving a reasonable amount, but a pint! That's very nearly an armful" Dr. MacTaggart finally persuades Hancock to donate the full pint by telling him he has a rare blood type, which appeals to Hancock's snobbery. Having boasted of his lack of squeamishness, he faints while giving blood.

Recuperating afterwards in a hospital room with other patients (including the two Hancock spoke to earlier), Hancock has a chat about blood with a fellow patient (Lloyd), but since neither of them knows very much about blood, the conversation is not very informative. After the patient has left, Hancock is horrified to discover that the man has walked off with his [Hancock's] wine gums. ("If you can't trust a blood donor, who can you trust?")

After returning home, Hancock cuts himself on a bread knife and is rushed to the Casualty Ward of the same hospital, where he receives a transfusion of his own blood — the only pint the hospital has of his rare blood type.

== Cast ==
- Tony Hancock – Anthony Aloysius St John Hancock
- Patrick Cargill – Dr MacTaggart
- Hugh Lloyd – Little man
- June Whitfield – Reception nurse
- Frank Thornton – Mr Johnson, a blood donor
- James Ottaway – Casualty ward doctor
- Peggy Ann Clifford – Mrs Forsythe, a blood donor
- Anne Marryott – 2nd nurse
- Jean Marlow – 3rd nurse

== Recording ==
While returning from recording The Bowmans a week earlier, Hancock was involved in a car accident, and rather than cancel the studio booking it was decided to place teleprompters around the set in order to save the comedian the problems of learning his lines after a delay in rehearsals. In the passage where he is alone looking at the posters, Hancock was obliged to learn his lines. While it is not true Hancock never learned a line from a script again, he increasingly relied on the device mostly thereafter in his TV career. Many Hancock devotees reckon this is one of his poorest TV performances, and it is indeed quite noticeable to see Hancock's eye movements towards the teleprompters when addressing the other performers. Others, though, see no real difference between this and other classic Hancock performances, and lines from the episode have become a part of British comic folklore ("A pint? That's very nearly an armful!" "Rhesus? They're monkeys aren't they?"), giving it now-legendary status.

== Remake and legacy ==
In October 1961, Pye Records produced an audio remake of "The Blood Donor" (duration: 28'10") starring most of the original cast, together with a remake of "The Radio Ham" (duration: 27'40") from the same series. These were produced in the style of the radio shows, complete with an (invited) studio audience, and released as an LP in 1961. These recordings have been available more or less continuously ever since, and are also found on several British comedy compilation sets.

The original episode survives in the BBC Archive as a 16mm telerecording with a separate magnetic soundtrack, and has been released on LaserDisc (BBCL 7004), VHS (BBCV 7034), Betamax (BBCB 7034) in 1985 and DVD (2000) compilations of Hancock episodes. The original soundtrack from the episode was also subsequently released on CD and audio cassette.

The script was re-recorded in 2009 for a BBC Radio 2 series of remakes of Galton and Simpson works. "The Blood Donor" starred Paul Merton, with Suzy Aitchison as the nurse, the role played by her mother 48 years earlier. It was first transmitted in March 2009.
