= Twelve Angry Men (Hancock's Half Hour) =

- Hancock's Half Hour episode
- Episode no.: Series 5 Episode 4
- Written by: Ray Galton; Alan Simpson
- Original air date: 16 October 1959
- Running time: 30 minutes

Episode chronology
← Previous "Lord Byron Lived Here"	Next → "The Train Journey"

"Twelve Angry Men" is an episode of the BBC television situation comedy programme Hancock's Half Hour, starring Tony Hancock and featuring Sid James, and first broadcast on 16 October 1959. Written by Ray Galton and Alan Simpson, the title is retrospectively applied; the episodes were not originally identified separately.

The episode is a parody of the 1957 film 12 Angry Men.

== Plot ==
Hancock and Sid are members of a jury in the trial of John Harrison Peabody, who is accused of stealing some jewellery. Hancock has been elected jury foreman and continually interrupts the proceedings. He asks if the jury can see the evidence for a second time, to which the judge agrees.

Hancock tries on one of the exhibits, a diamond ring, to examine it, and then finds he is unable to remove it. Numerous attempts to get the ring off prove futile, so he and the other jury members have to retire for their deliberations with the ring still stuck on Hancock's finger.

In the jury room, Hancock finds he is the only jury member voting not guilty, the other members being keen to bring the case to a conclusion as quickly as possible. Sid is in favour of finding the accused guilty before changing his mind when Hancock mentions that the jurors are being paid 30 shillings a day for their services. By using appeals to sentiment, emotional blackmail and talk of the fine tradition of British justice, Hancock gradually manages to persuade the other jurors to change their minds in favour of a not guilty verdict. One of the last jurors to be persuaded reluctantly follows the consensus, and warns Hancock that the freed man — if he is actually guilty — might once again embark on a life of burgling houses, possibly including Hancock's. The juror's words give Hancock second thoughts, and he has an abrupt change of opinion in favour of finding the accused guilty. The rest of the jury immediately do likewise (though Sid only does so on condition of being paid 30 shillings by each of the other jury members to compensate for "lost earnings") and they leave to deliver their verdict to the court, reflecting on how the values of British justice have triumphed.

Back in the courtroom, Hancock announces the jury's guilty verdict. As they are about to leave, the judge reminds Hancock that he has still not returned the diamond ring that was stuck on his finger. Hancock suddenly realises that the ring has gone, and can't think what has happened to it. The ring was exceedingly valuable, and its disappearance is a very serious matter; the judge asks if the police inspector is in court. The episode ends with all twelve previous jury members appearing in the dock, accused of the theft of a £20,000 diamond ring, with Hancock — still acting as spokesman for the ex-jurors — pleading guilty on behalf of them all, saying a prison sentence will be shorter than the trial. There are protests from the ex-jurors at this, and when Hancock demands to know who has the ring, a fight breaks out in the dock.

== Cast ==
- Tony Hancock ... Anthony Aloysius St John Hancock
- Sidney James ... Sidney Balmoral James (as Sid James)
- Austin Trevor ... Judge
- William Kendall ... Juror
- Leslie Perrins ... Juror
- Philip Ray ... Juror
- Leonard Sachs ... Defending Counsel
- Robert Dorning ... Policeman
- Ralph Nossek ... Prosecuting Counsel
- Alec Bregonzi ... Young man juror
- Hugh Lloyd ... Usher
- Lala Lloyd ... Juror
- Mario Fabrizi ... 12th juror
- Kenneth Kove ... Juror
- James Bulloch ... Juror
- Betty Cardno ... Juror
- Marie Lightfoot ... Juror

== Legacy ==
The comedian Ben Miller, in the BBC documentary My Hero: Ben Miller on Tony Hancock, said that "Twelve Angry Men" was his favourite Hancock episode and claimed to have watched it at least thirty times.

The episode was remade for ITV in 1996 with Paul Merton in the Hancock role, as part of the series Paul Merton in Galton and Simpson's...

The episode was rebroadcast on BBC Four in October 2022 as part of the BBC's 100th anniversary classic comedy season.
