= The Magnificent Seven Deadly Sins =

1971 British film by Graham Stark

- Poster
- Directed by: Graham Stark
- Written by: Graham Chapman; Barry Cryer; Ray Galton; Alan Simpson; Spike Milligan; John Esmonde; Bob Larbey; Graham Stark; Dave Freeman
- Produced by: Graham Stark
- Starring: Bruce Forsyth; Harry Secombe; Leslie Phillips; Harry H. Corbett; Ian Carmichael; Alfie Bass
- Cinematography: Harvey Harrison
- Edited by: Rod Nelson-Keys; Roy Piper
- Music by: Roy Budd
- Production company: Tigon
- Distributed by: Tigon Film Distributors
- Release date: November 1971
- Running time: 107 minutes
- Country: United Kingdom
- Language: English
- Budget: £116,000

The Magnificent Seven Deadly Sins is a 1971 British sketch comedy film directed and produced by Graham Stark. Its title is a conflation of The Magnificent Seven and the seven deadly sins. It comprises a sequence of seven sketches, each representing a sin and written by an array of British comedy-writing talent, including Graham Chapman, Spike Milligan, Barry Cryer and Galton and Simpson. The sketches are linked by animation sequences overseen by Bob Godfrey's animation studio. The music score is by British jazz musician Roy Budd, cinematography by Harvey Harrison and editing by Rod Nelson-Keys and Roy Piper. It was produced by Tigon Pictures and distributed in the U.K. by Tigon Film Distributors Ltd.

The cast features three James Bond actresses: Anouska Hempel and Julie Ege, who both appeared in On Her Majesty's Secret Service, and Madeline Smith, who would later appear in Live and Let Die. All three had minor roles.

== 1. Avarice ==
"Avarice" is written by John Esmonde and Bob Larbey. In this segment, a 50p coin falls down a drain and Elsinore, a pompous rich man, orders his chauffeur Clayton to retrieve it. A fisherman attempts to fish it out. The chauffeur's efforts result only in the coin dropping farther down into the sewer. Other people become involved in the search, including a policewoman and one of the workers in the sewer. In the end the rich man, seeing the sewage on the chauffeur, fires him but then falls straight into the open sewer. The chauffeur drops the coin in after him and after replacing the manhole cover, walks away with a purposeful stride.

=== Cast ===
- Bruce Forsyth as Clayton
- Paul Whitsun-Jones as Elsinore
- Bernard Bresslaw as Mr. Violet
- Joan Sims as policewoman
- Roy Hudd as fisherman
- Julie Samuel as petrol station attendant
- Cheryl Hall as Vanessa
- Suzanne Heath as Chloe

== 2. Envy ==
"Envy" is written by Dave Freeman. Stanley and his wife Vera are winners of the football pools and are looking to buy a huge house. His wife spots one and decides she must have it.

The owners enjoy a quiet life there and do not wish to sell. So Stanley decides to employ a series of schemes to force the owners of the house to sell their home so that they can buy it; one of these schemes involves creating a mock edition of the local newspaper that purports to tell the story of a new motorway that will go straight through their garden.

The owners sell to Stanley and wife. As they move in a mechanical digger is seen coming towards the house as it turns out the 'story' is actually true.

=== Cast ===
- Harry Secombe as Stanley
- Geoffrey Bayldon as Vernon
- June Whitfield as Mildred
- Carmel Cryan as Vera

== 3. Gluttony ==
"Gluttony" is written by Graham Chapman and Barry Cryer. In this sketch Dickie works for a health food firm selling slimming biscuits, but secretly is a compulsive eater who has food hidden all around his office. Matters get worse when Ingrid, the firm's sexy vice president, invites him for dinner.

=== Cast ===
- Leslie Phillips as Dickie
- Julie Ege as Ingrid
- Patrick Newell as doctor
- Rosemarie Reed as woman
- Sarah Golding as secretary
- Bob Guccione as photographer
- Tina McDowall as penthouse Pet

== 4. Lust ==
"Lust" is written by Graham Stark from a story by Marty Feldman. Ambrose Twombly is determined to find a partner and chats up a woman in an adjoining telephone box by looking through the glass, dialling the number of her telephone and convincing her that he is someone from her past who just happens to be on a "crossed line" by some extraordinary coincidence, cleverly prompting her with some personal details he has managed to spot. She seems quite excited about the prospect of meeting up with him, but before he gets the chance to arrange a meeting she tells him over the phone that there is a man looking at her with a face that looks like "a monkey" in the adjoining phone box (which is, of course, Corbett). The segment ends with a shot of a dangling handset. This was a reworking of the writers' Here I Come Whoever I Am episode in the fourth (1965) series of Comedy Playhouse.

=== Cast ===
- Harry H. Corbett as Ambrose Twombly
- Cheryl Kennedy as Greta
- Bill Pertwee as cockney man
- Mary Baxter as charlady
- Anouska Hempel as blonde
- Kenneth Earle as boy friend
- Nicole Yerna as thin girl
- Sue Bond as girl with glasses
- Yvonne Paul as receptionist

== 5. Pride ==
"Pride" is written by Alan Simpson and Ray Galton. In it, two motorists meet facing each other on a narrow country road, and neither is willing to pull aside to let the other pass. In the end, neither wins.

This was a reworking of the writers' Impasse episode in the second (1963) series of Comedy Playhouse. It was remade again in 1996 as an episode of Paul Merton in Galton & Simpson's....

=== Cast ===
- Ian Carmichael as Mr. Ferris
- Alfie Bass as Mr. Spencer
- Audrey Nicholson as Mrs. Ferris
- Sheila Bernette as Mrs. Spencer
- Robert Gillespie as A.A. patrol man
- Keith Smith as R.A.C. patrol man
- Ivor Dean as policeman

== 6. Sloth ==
"Sloth" is written by Spike Milligan. It features a series of silent black and white film clips, with dialogue captions, where people chose to be inactive rather than pursuing a logical course. In particular a tramp who refuses to take his hands out of his pockets, as he is holding his walnuts. The captions incorporate a running gag on the word "walnut".

=== Cast ===
- Spike Milligan as tramp
- Melvyn Hayes as porter
- Ronnie Brody as costermonger
- Ronnie Barker
- Peter Butterworth
- Marty Feldman
- Davy Kaye
- David Lodge
- Cardew Robinson
- Madeline Smith

== 7. Wrath ==
"Wrath" is written by Graham Chapman and Barry Cryer.

Two men in a public park are angered by the park keeper (Lewis plays his character Inspector Blake from On the Buses in all but name) telling them off for littering, so they try to kill him. Most of their schemes fail, but in the end they succeed, by planting a bomb in a washroom. However, this is only accomplished at the cost that they themselves die too. They think that they are in heaven, and plan to litter it too, but instead they find themselves in hell, and the man they tried to kill is actually the devil.

=== Cast ===
- Ronald Fraser as George
- Stephen Lewis as Jarvis, the park keeper
- Arthur Howard as Kenneth

== Critical reception ==
The Monthly Film Bulletin wrote: "Given the film's format, most of the burlesque of the seven featured sins (linked by brief animation sequences) inevitably inflates them into something like morality play abstractions (with formula doses of poetic, instead of divine, retribution). On the other hand, they no longer have the fatal attraction of forbidden fruit, simply the lure of permissible vanities and indulgences – much like the invitation of modern advertising, in fact. The exceptions to this mostly mild and unremarkable humour are two episodes that seem least tailored to the format: Lust, which has previously featured as an episode in a television series, and Sloth, inimitably tailored by Spike Milligan as a sepia-tinted, running, jumping and (only infrequently) standing still film."

The Radio Times Guide to Films gave the film 3/5 stars, writing: "Having packed his short film Simon, Simon [1970] with cameos by his famous friends, comic actor Graham Stark enticed even more comedians and comic writers to contribute to this, his only feature. It comprises seven sketches, each one a mildly amusing illustration of a deadly sin. The film is very much a product of its time, with familiar television faces performing glorified sitcom (two of the segments are adaptations of TV episodes), while busty starlets remove their clothes."

British film critic Leslie Halliwell said: "Compendium of comedy sketches, a very variable ragbag of old jokes."
