= The Radio Ham =

- Hancock episode
- Episode no.: Series 7 Episode 3
- Written by: Galton and Simpson
- Original air date: 9 June 1961
- Running time: 25 minutes

Episode chronology
← Previous "The Bowmans"	Next → "The Lift (a.k.a. Going Down)"

"The Radio Ham" is an episode from the comedy series Hancock, the final BBC series featuring British comedian Tony Hancock. First transmitted on 9 June 1961, the show was written by Ray Galton and Alan Simpson, and was produced by Duncan Wood. The title is a retronym.

== Synopsis ==
Anthony Hancock has taken up amateur radio as a hobby but is dissatisfied with his conversations with other users, which consist mainly of remote games of chess and Snakes and Ladders, as well as discussions about the weather with a fellow operator in Tokyo who speaks poor English.

Just as he is expressing his wish for more excitement in his hobby he hears a distress signal from a yachtsman whose boat is sinking. Hancock tries to help but struggles to copy down the man's location details correctly, suffering numerous inconveniences and interruptions such as a broken pencil, having to put another shilling in the electricity meter, having his radio set forcibly disconnected by his burly neighbour, getting the longitude and latitude mixed up and/or completely wrong, and, finally, the radio's valves (which he had just replaced at the start of the episode) giving out.

Hancock enlists the help of the police to get new valves, but when he gets his radio set working again he cannot re-establish contact with the man in distress. One of the police officers then reads in the newspaper that the yachtsman was rescued with the assistance of a radio operator in Tokyo, whom Hancock assumes with dismay to be his interlocutor from earlier.

Resuming his usual radio activities Hancock suffers checkmate in his chess game, following which he disconnects all the cables from his radio set whilst singing "When You Come to the End of a Perfect Day".

== Cast ==
- Tony Hancock - Anthony Aloysius St John Hancock
- Annie Leake - Woman
- Michael Peake - Very large man
- Edwin Richfield - Policeman
- Bernard Hunter - Policeman
- Andrew Faulds - Yachtsman's voice
- John Bluthal - Radio voice
- Geoffrey Matthews - Radio voice
- Geoffrey Lewis - Radio voice
- Honor Shepherd - Radio voice

== Pye re-recording ==
In October 1961 Pye Records produced an audio remake of "The Radio Ham", together with a remake of "The Blood Donor" from the same series. These were produced in the style of the radio shows, complete with an invited studio audience, and released as an LP in 1961. These recordings have been available more or less continuously ever since, and are also found on several British comedy compilation sets.

The re-recorded Pye version has a different ending from the original, with Hancock instead announcing over the airwaves that he is selling his radio equipment and inviting bids for it.

== Paul Merton remake ==
A remake starring Paul Merton in the Hancock role was broadcast on ITV on 9 February 1996 as part of the series Paul Merton in Galton & Simpson's...

== In popular culture ==
The line "Would you stop playing with that radio of yours, I'm trying to get to sleep!" from the Pye re-recording has seen common use in royalty-free sample libraries, leading to its use in singles such as George Michael's "Too Funky" and Hideki Naganuma's "Let Mom Sleep" in the video game Jet Set Radio and the No Sleep Remix in Jet Set Radio Future.
