= Citizen James =

British TV sitcom (1960–1962)

- Genre: Comedy
- Starring: Sid James; Sydney Tafler; Alec Bregonzi; Bill Kerr; Liz Fraser
- Country of origin: United Kingdom
- Original language: English
- No. of series: 3
- No. of episodes: 32 (21 missing)

Original release
- Network: BBC TV
- Release: 24 November 1960 – 23 November 1962

Citizen James is a BBC sitcom that ran for three series between 24 November 1960 and 23 November 1962. The show featured comedian and actor Sid James and Sydney Tafler with Bill Kerr and Liz Fraser appearing in early episodes. It was initially written by the comedy writing team of Galton and Simpson, who based the characters very much on the "Sidney Balmoral James" and "William Montmorency Beaumont Kerr" roles that they had played in Hancock's Half Hour.

The first series was set around 'Charlie's Nosh Bar', a cafe in Soho, and centred on Sid's get-rich-quick schemes. He is helped by "Billy the Kerr" and quite often frustrated by the local bookmaker Albert Welshman (Tafler). Liz Fraser played Sid's long-suffering girlfriend who has been waiting for seven years for Sid to set the date.

Changes were made to the format after the first series. Sid James' character was changed to be something of a people's champion, campaigning for social justice. Bill Kerr and Liz Fraser departed and Sidney Tafler played a different character: Charlie Davenport. The location switched from Soho to Sid and Charlie sharing a house.

Later episodes were written by then Morecambe & Wise writers Dick Hills and Sid Green.

Despite not being written by Galton and Simpson, the sets and familiar supporting cast gave these last two series a recognisable Hancock feeling to the proceedings.

== Episodes ==
Like many BBC series of this time, episodes were not necessarily retained (see Wiping). Only eleven episodes from the three series are known to still exist.

=== Series 1 (1960) ===
No. overall	No. in series	Title	Archival Status	Original release date
1	1	"The Race"	Exists	24 November 1960
Out of money, Sid hits on an idea to fix a "waiter's race" by use of a ringer.
2	2	"The Elixir"	Exists	1 December 1960
Sid and Bill try their hand in the snake-oil business, selling "Dr." Sidney James's Magical Elixir.
3	3	"The Money"	Exists	8 December 1960
Liz entrusts £300 to Sid to take to the Bank, but Sid and Bill soon find themselves parted from the money by Albert.
4	4	"The Rivals"	Exists	15 December 1960
Albert has a wager with Sid that he can get a date with Sid's fiancée. And at 10-1, Sid can't resist the odds.
5	5	"The Raffle"	Exists	22 December 1960
Sid and Bill have to organise a raffle to replace the 'Nosh Bar' Christmas money which went on Sid's gambling debts.
6	6	"The Brand Image"	Exists	29 December 1960
Sid and Bill try their hand at selling cigarettes but need an actor to help launch their new brand.

=== Series 2 (1961) ===
No. overall	No. in series	Title	Archival Status	Original release date
7	1	"The Lamp"	Missing	2 October 1961
TBC.
8	2	"Crusty Bread"	Exists	9 October 1961
Sid and Charlie set out to find why the old style crusty bread loaves have disappeared. Why aren't they baked any more if people still want them?
9	3	"Kids"	Missing	16 October 1961
TBC.
10	4	"The Handbag"	Missing	23 October 1961
TBC.
11	5	"The Football Team"	Missing	30 October 1961
TBC.
12	6	"The Hotel"	Missing	6 November 1961
TBC.
13	7	"Insurance"	Missing	13 November 1961
TBC.
14	8	"Sit-Down"	Missing	20 November 1961
TBC.
15	9	"The Rally"	Missing	27 November 1961
TBC.
16	10	"The Pensioner"	Missing	4 December 1961
TBC.
17	11	"Teenagers"	Exists	11 December 1961
Sid and Charlie go rushing across the country to stop a young couple on their way to Gretna Green.
18	12	"Washing Day"	Missing	18 December 1961
TBC.
19	13	"Christmas Day"	Missing	25 December 1961
TBC.

=== Series 3 (1962) ===
No. overall	No. in series	Title	Archival Status	Original release date
20	1	"The Hospital"	Missing	31 August 1962
TBC.
21	2	"The Play's the Thing"	Missing	7 September 1962
TBC.
22	3	"The Tennis Ball"	Missing	14 September 1962
TBC.
23	4	"It's Not Cricket"	Missing	21 September 1962
TBC.
24	5	"The Reporter"	Missing	28 September 1962
TBC.
25	6	"The Day Out"	Exists	5 October 1962
Sid and Charlie are in Whitsea for a day-trip, but find in difficult to find a space in a overcrowded beach.
26	7	"The Transistor"	Missing	12 October 1962
TBC.
27	8	"The Old People's Outing"	Missing	19 October 1962
TBC.
28	9	"A Perfect Friendship?"	Missing	26 October 1962
TBC.
29	10	"The Watchdog"	Exists	2 November 1962
After catching a burgular in his living room, Sid purchases a guard dog after the Police fail to notice his concerns.
30	11	"The Librarian"	Missing	9 November 1962
TBC.
31	12	"The Tube Station"	Missing	16 November 1962
TBC.
32	13	"The Jury"	Exists	23 November 1962
Sid and Charlie are on jury duty. Sid enrages the other members from preventing a unanimous decision when he's not convinced about the evidence.

== DVD ==
The then-surviving episodes, comprising the complete Series One, and two episodes each from Series Two and Series Three, were released as a collection by Acorn Media UK in February 2012. A further episode, the sixth episode of series three, was subsequently found in a store room of Monaco Television, by Philip Morris.
