= Dawson's Weekly =

1975 British TV comedy series

- Genre: Comedy
- Written by: Ray Galton; Alan Simpson
- Directed by: Vernon Lawrence
- Starring: Les Dawson
- Composer: Ken Jones
- Country of origin: United Kingdom
- Original language: English
- No. of series: 1
- No. of episodes: 7

Production
- Producer: Vernon Lawrence
- Running time: 30 minutes
- Production company: Yorkshire Television

Original release
- Network: ITV
- Release: 12 June – 29 June 1975

Dawson's Weekly is a British television series featuring seven half-hour comedy plays, written by Ray Galton and Alan Simpson, and starring Les Dawson. It ran from 12 June to 29 July 1975.
