= The Bowmans =

- Hancock episode
- Episode no.: Series 7 Episode 2
- Written by: Galton and Simpson
- Original air date: 2 June 1961
- Running time: 25 minutes

Episode chronology
← Previous "The Bedsitter"	Next → "The Radio Ham"

"The Bowmans" is an episode of the BBC television situation comedy programme Hancock, the final BBC series featuring Tony Hancock, first broadcast on 2 June 1961. It was written by Ray Galton and Alan Simpson. The title is a retronym; the episodes were not originally identified individually.

== Outline and background ==
Hancock plays an actor in a fictional radio serial called The Bowmans, a parody of the real BBC radio programme The Archers. The theme tune to The Bowmans is a close variation by series composer Wally Stott of the real Archers theme tune "Barwick Green". Hancock plays Joshua Merriweather, a character similar to the soap opera's country bumpkin Walter Gabriel. Hancock's behaviour annoys the other actors and producers, so they kill off his character – only to find the audience holds the character in great affection. Hancock has difficulties finding new work, but audience reaction compels the BBC to resurrect his character by discovering a long-lost twin brother, Ben, in a new programme called The Merriweathers, with Hancock's involvement resuming under a lucrative new contract. In the first episode of the new serial, a substantial portion of the village – i.e. the original Bowmans cast – are killed off, falling to their deaths down a disused mine-shaft, and Ben proposes repopulating the village with his other relatives (all to be played by Hancock).

The supporting cast includes Patrick Cargill as the producer, Peter Glaze as an animal impersonator and Brian Oulton as the actor portraying the patriarch of the Bowmans family.

The plot may have been inspired by the death of the character Grace Archer in The Archers in September 1955.

== Cast ==
- Tony Hancock as Anthony Aloysius St John Hancock
- Patrick Cargill as the Producer
- Dennis Chinnery as the Reporter
- Victor Platt as the Postman
- Hugh Lloyd as the Florist
- Bruno Barnarbe as a BBC Official
- William Sherwood as Julian Court
- Brian Oulton as "Dan Bowman"
- Constance Chapman as "Gladys Bowman"
- Gwenda Ewen as "Diane Bowman"
- Alec Bregonzi as "Fred"
- Peter Glaze as "Harold"
- Ralph Wilson as "The Doctor"
