= Peter Glaze =

English comedian (1917–1983)

- Born: William George Peter Glaze; 17 September 1917; London, England
- Died: 20 February 1983 (aged 65); Dartford, Kent, England
- Occupation: Comedian

William George Peter Glaze (17 September 1917 – 20 February 1983) was an English comedian and comic actor, whose greatest popularity was on children's television in the 1960s and 1970s.

== Life and career ==
Peter Glaze was born in London, the son of an actor-manager. He began his career in entertainment as a comedian at the Windmill Theatre in 1946. He was the Crazy Gang's understudy. He appeared in a supporting role in the Crazy Gang's final film, Life Is a Circus, in 1958.

From 1960 until his retirement in the early 1980s, he featured regularly in the children's television series Crackerjack, alongside hosts Eamonn Andrews and Leslie Crowther in the 1960s, and Michael Aspel, Don Maclean and Bernie Clifton in the 1970s. In Crackerjack sketches, he usually played a pompous or middle-class character, who would always get exasperated with his partner Don Maclean during the course of the sketch. Maclean would then give an alliterative reply, such as "Don't get your knickers in a knot" or "Don't get your tights in a twist". He regularly uttered the expression "D'oh!", originated by James Finlayson in Laurel and Hardy films, long before it became associated with cartoon character Homer Simpson. Short in stature, plump and bespectacled, Glaze often took part in slapstick routines on the show, as "a human punchbag for punchlines."

Besides Crackerjack, Glaze featured in a wide range of comic and dramatic roles in theatre and television, including the head juror in Anthony Newley's The Strange World of Gurney Slade (1960).. He appeared in the 1981 musical Underneath the Arches, with Roy Hudd and Christopher Timothy as Flanagan and Allen; he assisted Hudd in a re-creation of one of the Gang's routines for a televised Royal Variety Performance in 1982. He also appeared in Whack-O! (1958); as the villainous City Administrator in the Doctor Who serial The Sensorites (1964); and in The Sweeney episode "Big Spender" (1975) as Joe Spratt. Glaze also played the actor supplying the farm-animal noises in the Hancock episode "The Bowmans" (1961). He was also on the panel of the long-running radio panel game Twenty Questions, along with Joy Adamson, Anona Winn and Norman Hackforth.

On the day after his final performance in the Crazy Gang tribute musical, Underneath the Arches, he died from a heart attack at his home in Dartford, Kent, in 1983 at the age of 65.
