= Comedy Playhouse (series 2) =

Second series of the BBC series Comedy Playhouse

The second series of Comedy Playhouse, the long-running BBC series, aired from 1 March 1963 to 12 April 1963. All the episodes were written by Ray Galton and Alan Simpson.

== Background ==
The second series, which was in black and white, consisted of six episodes, each of which had a different cast and storyline. None of the episodes made it to its own series. All episodes were aired on Friday; Our Man in Moscow at 8.45pm, And Here, All The Way From... and A Clerical Error at 8.50pm, Impasse at 8pm, Have You Read This Notice at 8.20pm and The Handyman at 7.50pm. Have You Read This Notice is the only episode of this second series which is listed as being lost.

== Episodes ==
Title	Airdate	Duration	Overview	IMDb link
Our Man in Moscow	1 March 1963	30 mins	Robert Morley played Sir William Hunter, the British Ambassador to Russia, who faces a problem when Nicolai (played by Patrick Wymark), a Russian tuba player, applies for asylum. Hunter's secretary Mortimer is played by Frank Thornton while the Russian Culture Minister Kulkinoff is played by Anthony Newlands.	
And Here, All The Way From...	8 March 1963	25 mins	District Commissioner Donald Lawrence (played by Eric Barker) goes all the way to Shepherd's Bush from Borneo to meet his brother Rodney (not seen) who is being honoured with a This Is Your Life show. However, when Donald finally gets there he discovers it has been called off because his brother disapproved. Also starring Erica Rogers as Pamela Lawrence, Terence Alexander as Robin Ampleforth, Roger Delgado and Roger Avon.	
Impasse	15 March 1963	25 mins	Two drivers, one in a Bentley the other in a small, rundown car, meet each other halfway down a narrow country lane. Both refuse to give way, and the situation becomes worse when both the AA and RAC arrive and begin to defend their respective members. Bernard Cribbins plays Mr Spooner, Yootha Joyce plays his wife, Leslie Phillips plays Mr Ferris, Georgina Cookson plays Mrs Ferris, Harry Locke plays the AA man, Duncan Macrae plays the RAC man and Campbell Singer plays the Police Constable. This was remade as the Pride segment in the anthology film The Magnificent Seven Deadly Sins, and again for Paul Merton In Galton & Simpson's... in 1996.	
Have You Read This Notice?	29 March 1963	25 mins	Frankie Howerd plays Norman Fox, who is coming back from a holiday in Switzerland and is plagued by conscience when going through Customs due to the watch he bought there. Also starring Bill Kerr as the first Customs officer, Edwin Apps as the aeroplane passenger and Graham Ashley.	
A Clerical Error	5 April 1963	25 mins	John Le Mesurier plays a con man recently released from Wormwood Scrubs called Caleb Bullrush. Bullrush dresses up as a vicar and goes to a pub to try and collect money for charity. Also starring Russell Napier as the Police Inspector, Yootha Joyce as Rita, Blake Butler, Andy Devine and John Caesar. A Clerical Error was remade for The Galton & Simpson Radio Playhouse and broadcast on 12 January 1999 on BBC Radio 4 and starred Keith Barron as Bullrush and June Whitfield as Rita.	
The Handyman	12 April 1963	25 mins	Lionel Hogg (played by Alfred Marks) is an unemployed, but highly qualified machine minder who is given a temporary job as handyman at a health clinic. Also starring Anthony Sharp as Dr Dennison, Damaris Hayman as Matron, Frank Williams as the Labour Exchange clerk, Edwin Apps as the first card player, Julian Orchard as the second card player and John Harvey.	
