= Twelve Angry Men (disambiguation) =

12 Angry Men is a 1957 American courtroom drama film written by Reginald Rose and directed by Sidney Lumet.

12 Angry Men or Twelve Angry Men may also refer to :

- "Twelve Angry Men" (Studio One), a 1954 episode of the American anthology television series Studio One, written by Reginald Rose
- Twelve Angry Men (1955 play), an adaptation of the Studio One teleplay written by Sherman L. Sergel
- Twelve Angry Men (1964 play), Reginald Rose's own stage version based on his screenplay for the 1957 film
- 12 Angry Men (1997 film), a made-for-television MGM remake of the 1957 film, broadcast on Showtime
- "Twelve Angry Men" (Hancock's Half Hour), a 1959 episode of the British comedy television series Hancock's Half Hour
- Other adaptations of Twelve Angry Men

== See also ==
- "12 and a Half Angry Men", an episode of the animated TV series Family Guy
- 12 Angry Viewers, a 1997–1998 MTV television show involving judging of music videos
