= Freddie Ross Hancock =

British entertainment industry figure (1930–2022)

Freda Ross Hancock MBE (born Freda Ross, 7 April 1930 – 27 November 2022) was a British-born, New York based entertainment industry marketing consultant and the founder of the East Coast branch of the British Academy of Film and Television Arts.

Ross began her career in the British entertainment industry as a publicist and agent. She worked for some of Britain's leading entertainers of the 1950s and 1960s, initially she focused on comedic performers such as Benny Hill, Harry H. Corbett, Dick Emery, Bob Monkhouse, Terry Scott, Hugh Lloyd, Sheila Hancock and Tony Hancock. She represented Tony Hancock from 1954 onwards, helping guide him to his greatest public and critical successes on radio and television. The couple started their romantic relationship in 1957 and after the comedian divorced his first wife, they married in December 1965. However, their marriage was affected by Tony Hancock's drinking and self-destructive behaviour.

Unable to save Tony Hancock from his chronic alcoholism, she filed for divorce in 1968. His personal and professional life had spiralled downwards resulting in Hancock taking his own life while working in Australia in June 1968, just after a decree nisi was granted.

Ross was in demand for her services and was also engaged to promote films and stage shows. Clients included the British arm of Universal-International, later Universal, which hired her to promote Shelley Winters, Rock Hudson, and Piper Laurie among many, and the Coral Leisure Group.

Other entertainers, actors, musicians, writers, sports personalities and celebrities who engaged Hancock while she worked in the UK include Sophia Loren, Carlo Ponti, Julie Andrews, Theo Bikel, Topol, Billie Whitelaw, Jim Dale, Keith Waterhouse, Willis Hall, bandleader Ted Heath, Ray Martin, Norrie Paramor, Eddie Calvert, Rose Brennan, Janie Marden, Gerry and the Pacemakers, racing driver Stirling Moss, Wimbledon champion Angela Buxton, and Australian golfer Peter Thomson.

In November 1988, she organised the official 80th birthday celebrations given in New York for British broadcaster Alistair Cooke by the BBC for which she secured the musical services of James Galway and Leonard Bernstein and a personal video greeting from President Ronald Reagan.

In the 1990s and 2000s, Hancock served as the Senior Vice-President of Acquisitions for the movie distributor American Video Films.

Hancock was appointed Member of the Order of the British Empire (MBE) in the 2002 Birthday Honours "for services to UK-US cultural understanding."

In her role as Founder and Vice Chairman of BAFTA East Coast, Hancock was the primary instigator and facilitator in the appointment of film mogul Harvey Weinstein as a CBE for Weinstein's services to the British film industry. Hancock also arranged the investiture ceremony held in Manhattan in November 2004.

Ross was appointed Vice-Chairman of the US wing of the Royal Television Society.

In 1969 she wrote Hancock, a biography of her then recently deceased estranged husband, Tony Hancock, with the journalist David Nathan. In a 1991 BBC television dramatisation of the life of Tony Hancock, she is played by the British actress Frances Barber.

Ross died on 27 November 2022, at the age of 92.
