= James Ottaway =

British actor (1908–1999)

James Ottaway

William Cecil James Ottaway (25 July 1908 – 16 June 1999) was a British film, television and stage actor whose career spanned seven decades.

== Family background ==
Born in 1908 in Chertsey in Surrey, Ottaway was the son of William Henry Ottaway, an enthusiastic amateur actor with the St Pancras People's Theatre and the Superintendent of the School of Handicrafts for Poor Boys in Chertsey, and his wife Mary Ellen, the School's Matron. Their oldest son was Andrew Kenneth Cosway Ottaway (1905-1980), a lecturer in Education at the University of Leeds. A younger son was Christopher Wyndham Ottaway (1910-1978), Research Professor of Veterinary Science at the University of Bristol from 1973 to 1975.

== Early career and first theatre roles ==
James Ottaway graduated from Imperial College London in 1929 and became a teacher. However, having become interested in acting while appearing in amateur dramatics, he left teaching to train at the Central School of Speech and Drama. Leaving in 1937, he made his stage debut in The Island at the Q Theatre. Also in 1937 he appeared in an early television production, Capital Punishment, broadcast by the BBC from Alexandra Palace.

== Further theatre roles ==
He made his stage debut in 1937 as the Club Waiter in The Island at the Q Theatre, reprising the role at the Comedy Theatre in 1938. Later in 1937 Tyrone Guthrie, the director of The Old Vic, cast Ottaway as a Messenger alongside a young Laurence Olivier in the title role in Macbeth. Ottaway subsequently toured with the Old Vic company during 1940 and 1941.

After service in the British Army during World War II, Ottaway was demobbed in 1947 and resumed his theatrical career, playing Joseph Taft in Four Hours to Kill (Saville Theatre, 1948); Mr Wingate in Top of the Ladder (St James's Theatre, 1950); Dr Jadin in The Madwoman of Chaillot (St James's Theatre, 1951); Forshaw in His House in Order (New Theatre, 1951). From 1951 to 1955 he again appeared with Tyrone Guthrie and The Old Vic company, joining tours of South Africa in 1952 and Australia in 1955.

He acted for several seasons at the Open Air Theatre, Regent's Park, playing Quince in A Midsummer Night's Dream (1962, 1967); Sir Nathaniel in Love's Labour's Lost (1962); Dr Welling in Kill Two Birds (St Martin's Theatre, 1962); Verges in Much Ado About Nothing (1963); The Gentleman in The Devil May Care (Strand Theatre, 1963); in the pantomime The Man in the Moon with Charlie Drake (London Palladium, 1963); Murchison in The Waiting Game (Arts Theatre, 1966), and Chaucer in the musical The Canterbury Tales (Phoenix Theatre, 1968) and Ragueneau in Cyrano de Bergerac (1967). Ottaway played four roles in A Voyage Round My Father at the Greenwich Theatre (1970), played Kemp in Entertaining Mr Sloane at the Royal Court Theatre, which later transferred to the Duke of York's Theatre (both 1975), and appeared as Polonius in Hamlet at the Thorndike Theatre in Leatherhead (1970).

== Television and film ==
His television appearances included The Soldier in Capital Punishment (1937); Peter in Romeo and Juliet (1947); Soldier in Edward II (1947); Mr Brudenell in The Devil's Disciple (1949); Cibber in Whirligig (1950); The Passing Show (1951); Rev. Ambrose Wistons in The Cathedral (1952); Sunday Night Theatre (1952); Bates in The Commonplace Heart (1953); Sir Thomas Clarges in The Diary of Samuel Pepys (1958); Dr Pennington in Emergency – Ward 10 (1958); Second Doctor in The Blood Donor episode of Hancock's Half Hour (1961); Dr Cranston in The Saint (1963); Mr Roberts/Allan in No Hiding Place (1960-1965); Mr Martin/Frank Meek in Dixon of Dock Green (1956-1969); Thomas Anthem in The Fellows (Late of Room 17) (1967); Scrophulus in Up Pompeii! (1970); Mr. Stone, in the 'Ride, Ride' episode of Tales of Unease, (1970); Member of Parliament in Dad's Army (1972); Thompson in Softly, Softly: Task Force (1973); Bill Chadwick in Follyfoot (1973); Maxie in The Changes (1975); Jack King in Z-Cars (1977); Uncle Billy in The Sweeney (1978); Dick Fawcett/Pub Customer in All Creatures Great and Small (1978-1988); Arthur in Quatermass (1979); George Taylor in The Gentle Touch (1980-1984); Percy/Vickery in Minder (1980-1991); Reverend Fulljames in Hi-de-Hi! (1983); Bob Hilton in Auf Wiedersehen, Pet (1984); Vicar in Shine on Harvey Moon (1984); Mr Light in Grange Hill (1985); three different roles in Casualty (1987-1993); Mr North in Boon (1988); Mr Russell in Agatha Christie's Poirot (1989); Mr Oxley in Keeping Up Appearances (1990); Mourner in The Widowmaker (1990); Mr Burwash in Jeeves and Wooster (1993); Jack Coverly in Pie in the Sky (1995); Mr Adams in A Touch of Frost (1995); Mr Wellington in As Time Goes By (1998); and three different roles in The Bill (1992-1998).

Film appearances included Johnson in In the Wake of a Stranger (1959); Grandad in That'll Be the Day (1973); Father Matthews in Absolution 1978) and Commissionaire in The Long Good Friday (1980), as well as appearing in Room 43 (1958), The Man Who Liked Funerals (1959) and Rahn in The Man Who Finally Died (1962).

== Personal life ==
Ottaway first met his wife Anne Pichon when they were both members of the St Pancras People's Theatre, but they did not marry until 1965 after meeting again later in life. One nephew, Sir Richard Ottaway, was the Conservative MP for Croydon South, while another, Mark Ottaway, was chief travel writer on The Sunday Times.

James Ottaway died on 16 June 1999 in London at the age of 90.

== Filmography ==
Year	Title	Role	Notes
1958	Passport to Shame	Assistant Registrar	
1959	The Man Who Liked Funerals	Butler	
1959	In the Wake of a Stranger	Johnson	
1963	The Man Who Finally Died	Rahn-Hotel Manager	Uncredited
1965	You Must Be Joking!	Army Officer	Uncredited
1968	Inadmissible Evidence	Watson's Guest	
1973	That'll Be the Day	Granddad	
1978	Absolution	Father Matthews	
1979	The Quatermass Conclusion	Arthur	
1980	The Long Good Friday	Commissionaire	
