= Milford Hospital =

- Royal Surrey NHS Foundation Trust
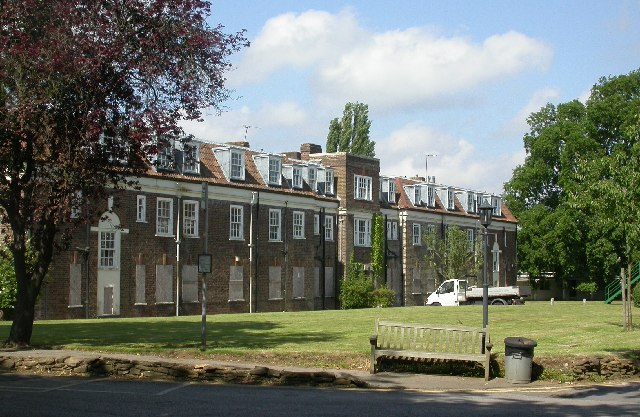
- Milford Hospital

- Location in Surrey

Geography
- Location: Milford, Surrey, England, United Kingdom
- Coordinates: 51°10′01″N 0°37′34″W

Organisation
- Care system: Public NHS
- Type: Specialist

Services
- Beds: 30
- Speciality: Rehabilitation care; Diagnostics

History
- Founded: 1909

Links
- Website: Milford Hospital
- Lists: Hospitals in England

Milford Hospital is a community hospital located in the Surrey village of Milford. It is managed by the Royal Surrey NHS Foundation Trust.

== History ==
The hospital has its origins in the County Sanatorium which was established in 1909 and later developed into the Surrey Smallpox Hospital. After the First World War it was decided to establish a facility for the treatment of tuberculosis on the site and a foundation stone was laid by Lord Ashcombe in May 1927. The new facility, which was designed by Sydney Tattle and built by Chapman, Lower and Peptic, was officially opened by Neville Chamberlain MP, Minister for Health, as the Surrey County Sanatorium on 20 July 1928.

The hospital joined the National Health Service as the Milford Sanatorium in 1948. Ray Galton and Alan Simpson (the writers of Hancock's Half Hour and Steptoe and Son) created comedy scripts together after meeting while patients in Milford Sanitorium in 1948. It was also the location for an episode of Doctor Who starring Jon Pertwee and his adversaries, the Silurians, in 1969. The facility became the Milford Chest Hospital in 1972.

A long campaign to secure the future of Milford Hospital as a centre of excellence was rewarded in 2010 with the announcement that it would become a rehabilitation care centre for the Guildford and Waverley area.

The hospital is also the location of the Royal Surrey's Community Diagnostic Centre with MRI and CT scanners, along with facilities for X-ray, ultrasound, echocardiogram and phlebotomy diagnostics. There are also specialist clinics for multiple sclerosis and Parkinson's amongst others.

== See also ==
- List of hospitals in England
