= Mark Gravett =

English cricketer

Personal information
- Born: 11 February 1865; Milford, Surrey, England
- Died: 8 February 1938 (aged 72); Godalming, Surrey, England
- Bowling: Slow left-arm orthodox

Domestic team information
- Years: Team
- 1899–1900: Hampshire

Career statistics
Competition	First-class
Matches	4
Runs scored	41
Batting average	6.83
100s/50s	0/0
Top score	17*
Balls bowled	1,001
Wickets	15
Bowling average	29.66
5 wickets in innings	1
10 wickets in match	0
Best bowling	5/50
Catches/stumpings	4/–
- Source: Cricinfo, 24 December 2009

Mark Gravett (11 February 1865 — 8 February 1938) was an English first-class cricketer.

Gravett was born in February 1865 at Milford, Surrey. A professional who bowled slow left-arm orthodox, he was engaged by Burnley Cricket Club in the Lancashire League in 1895, having previously been engaged by Swindon Cricket Club in Wiltshire. Gravett played first-class cricket for Hampshire, making his debut against Essex at Southampton in the 1899 County Championship. The following season, he made three first-class appearances in the County Championship against Lancashire, Worcestershire, and Sussex. In his four first-class appearances, he took 15 wickets at an average of 29.66; he took one five wicket haul, with figures of 5 for 50 against Lancashire. Soon after, Gravett moved to Fenton in Staffordshire where he ran a sports outfitting business which adjoined Fenton railway station. He continued to play club cricket into the 1920s, when having returned to Milford, he took figures of 10 for 21 at the age of 56, against Haslemere Comrades. Gravett died at Godalming in February 1938.
