= Duncan Wood =

British TV producer, director, writer (1925–1997)

- Wood (right) with Tony Hancock & Sid James (Photo: Bob Collins, 1959)
- Born: Wilfred Duncan Wood; 24 March 1925; Bristol, England
- Died: 11 January 1997 (aged 71); London, England
- Occupation: TV producer
- Years active: 1955–1980

Wilfred Duncan Wood (24 March 1925 – 11 January 1997) was a British comedy producer, director and writer, who has been described as "the founding father of the British TV sitcom".

Wood's best-known achievements were to produce all of Tony Hancock's Half Hours for BBC TV during the late 1950s and early 1960s, and later the sitcom Steptoe and Son for most of its run, created by Hancock's former writers Ray Galton and Alan Simpson.

From 1970 to 1973, Wood was the BBC's Head of Comedy. He left in 1973 to become Head of Light Entertainment at Yorkshire Television and was responsible for commissioning Rising Damp.

== Life and career ==
Born in Bristol, he trained with the BBC as an outside broadcast engineer, before serving in south east Asia with the Royal Signals during the Second World War. He returned to the BBC in 1948, working on the Olympic Games, and in the early 1950s started working as a producer of radio variety programmes, such as Workers' Playtime, on which he worked with up-and-coming comedians including Dick Emery, Tony Hancock, and Benny Hill. He moved into television in 1953, and worked on a wide range of programmes including dancing and panel shows.

He became a specialist producer of comedy programmes, following initial success in 1955 with the sketch show Great Scott - It's Maynard!. In the late 1950s and early 1960s, he produced many of the BBC's most popular comedy shows, featuring Benny Hill, Frankie Howerd, Ken Dodd, and others. In 1956, he became producer and director of Tony Hancock's Hancock's Half Hour, working closely with writers Ray Galton and Alan Simpson. According to writer Graham McCann, Wood "took the trouble to cast the occasional players just as carefully as he did the regular characters...Then came the cameras and the editing... where Wood went far beyond his contemporaries... because of the way that, step by step, he shaped and set out the syntax of sitcom shooting."

In 1960 he was appointed as Chief Assistant Head of Programmes in the BBC's Light Entertainment Department, where he produced Steptoe and Son, the first sitcom to have serious 'straight' actors in the leading roles, with scripts (again by Galton and Simpson) who brought "darkness... honesty, compassion and insight" to their scripts. Also during the 1960s, he produced such series as Citizen James, Hugh And I, The Bed-Sit Girl, Harry Worth, Oh Brother!, The World of Beachcomber, and many editions of Comedy Playhouse.

From 1970 to 1973, he was the BBC's Head of Comedy, replacing Michael Mills. He left in 1973 to become Head of Light Entertainment at Yorkshire Television and was responsible for commissioning Rising Damp.

He retired in 1984 but continued to work as a consultant for several years. He died in 1997 at the age of 71.
