= George Lewis Luker =

English painter

George Lewis Luker (1841-1902) was an English painter and architect.

== Life and work ==
George Lewis Luker was born in Oxford in 1845. He was trained as an architect but developed into a very talented watercolour landscape painter. During the 1880s he was based in London, then Milford, Surrey by 1887 before relocating to No.10 New Inn, Westminster, London before and at the time of his death on 3 February 1902. He had at death low assets — publicly sworn (in probate) by his executrix, the wife of Thomas William Allen, at £46 13s. 6d.

== Exhibitions ==
He exhibited prolifically at all the major exhibitions including:

- The Royal Society of Artists, Birmingham
- The Dudley Gallery and New Dudley Gallery
- Glasgow Institute of Fine Arts
- Walker Art Gallery, Liverpool
- Manchester City Art Gallery
- The Royal Academy, London
- Royal Society of British Artists
- The Royal Institute of Painters in Watercolours
- Arthur Tooth and Sons Gallery
