= Milford, Surrey =

Village and parish in Surrey, England

Coordinates: 51°10′N 0°39′W

Milford
- Village
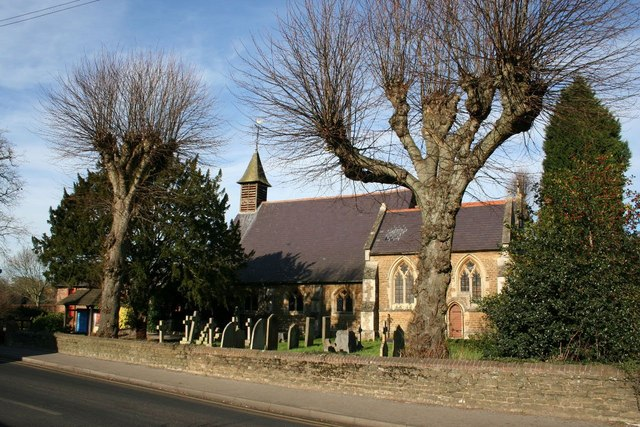
- St John the Evangelist Church, Milford

- Location within Surrey
- Population: 4,156 (2011 Census Ward)
- OS grid reference: SU943421
- Civil parish: Witley and Milford
- District: Waverley
- Shire county: Surrey
- Region: South East
- Country: England
- Sovereign state: United Kingdom
- Post town: Godalming
- Postcode district: GU8
- Dialling code: 01483
- Police: Surrey
- Fire: Surrey
- Ambulance: South East Coast
- UK Parliament: Godalming and Ash
- Website: Witley & Milford Parish Council

Milford is a village in the civil parish of Witley and Milford south west of Godalming in Surrey, England. It was a small village in the early medieval period; it grew significantly after the building of the Portsmouth Direct Line which serves Godalming railway station and its own minor stop railway station. The village, served by a wide array of shops and amenities, has to one side an all-directions junction of the A3, one of Britain's trunk roads. Nearby settlements are Eashing, Shackleford, Witley and Elstead, and the hamlets of Enton and Hydestile, all of which are in the Borough of Waverley. The west of the parish is in the Surrey Hills AONB.

== Transportation ==
Until the 1990s, the A3 road ran through the edge of the village (it now bypasses it to the west). Milford is still an important road junction, where the A283 road and A286 roads leave the A3 and run south to West Sussex. Milford railway station is on the Portsmouth Direct Line between London Waterloo and Portsmouth Harbour.

== Education ==
Milford has a primary school, Milford Infant School, and a secondary school, Rodborough School.

== Facilities ==
The Church of England Parish Church is St John the Evangelist, on Church Road. St Joseph's Roman Catholic Church is on Portsmouth Road, and Milford Baptist Church is on New Road.

The village has a cricket green and a football pitch which is home to Milford & Witley Football Club and Milford Cricket Club, who have two teams who play in the Saturday I'Anson League. Here, the Burton Pavilion also hosts dance, yoga and pilates classes. Another green in the village, the Jubilee field, is used for village fêtes and travelling funfairs and circuses. Milford also has Brownie and Guide Companies and Scouting troops. Milford also has a Bowling Green and club. Additionally, Milford is the home of Milford Pumas Youth Football Club, a community youth football club serving 7- to 17-year-old boys and girls.

Milford Hospital is a former sanatorium that is now the rehabilitation centre for the Guildford and Waverley districts.

== Notable residents ==
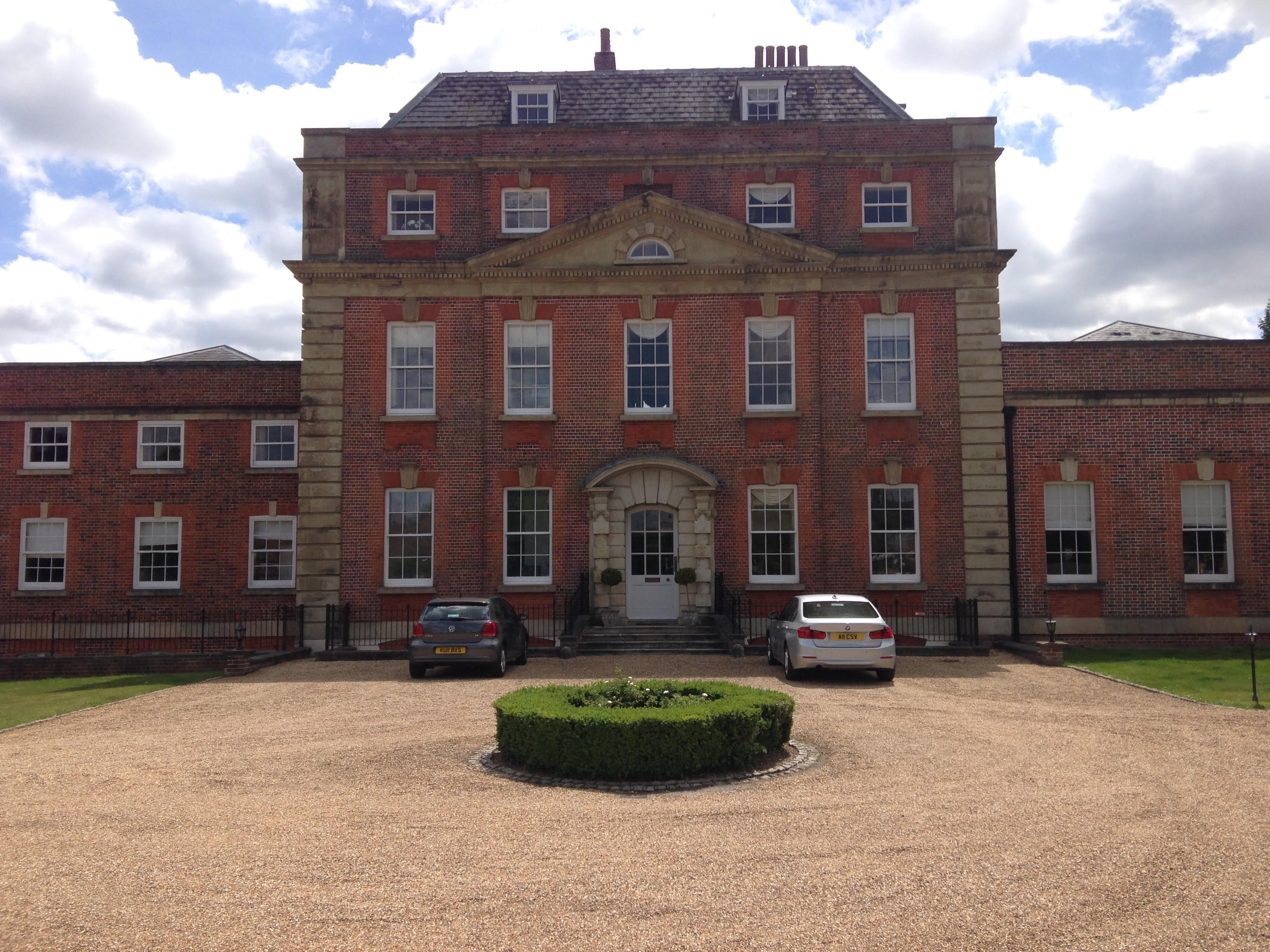
Milford House

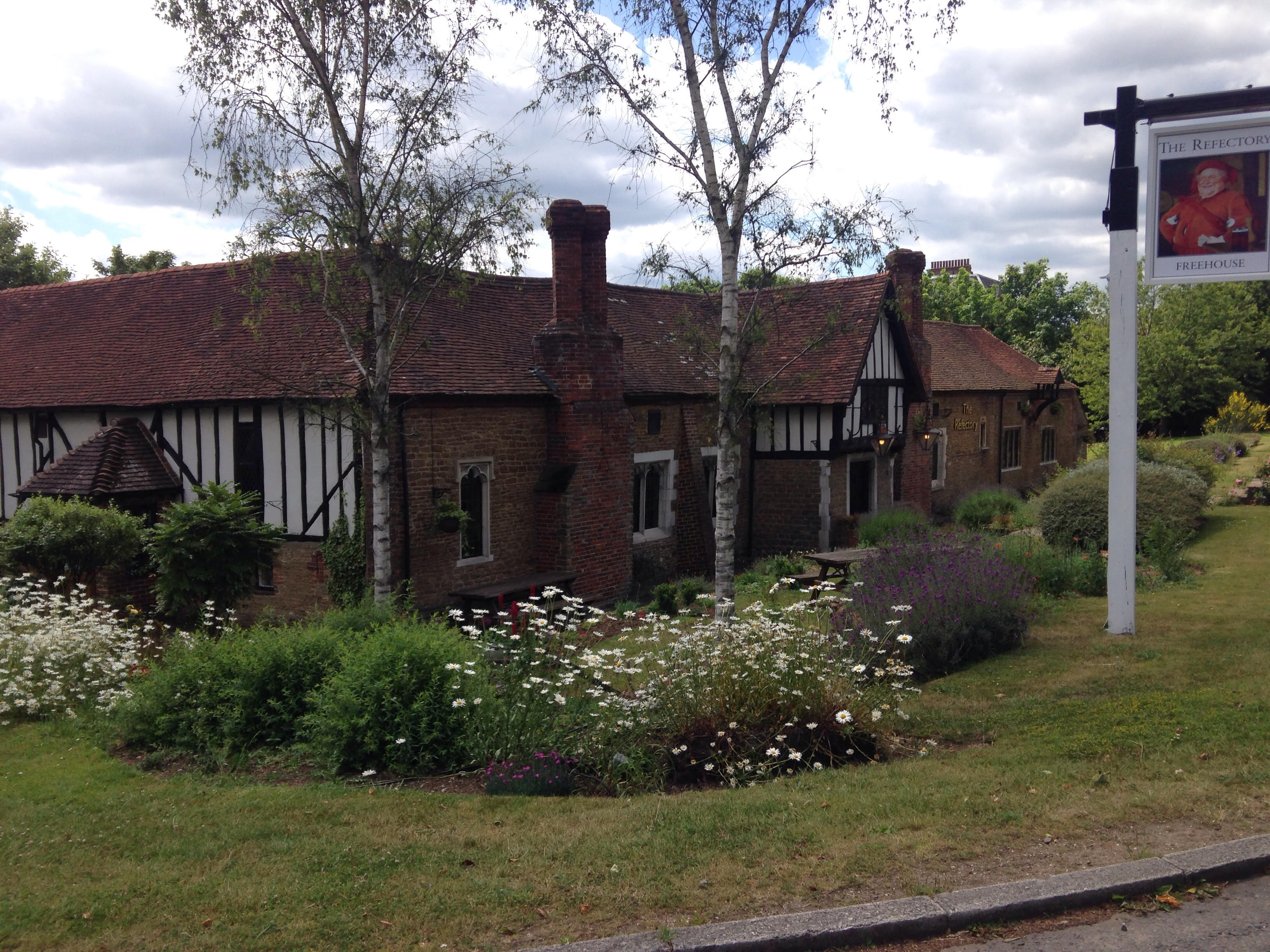
The Refectory public house and restaurant

- James Archer (1823–1904), painter
- Philip Barker Webb (1793–1854), botanist
- Judith Blunt-Lytton, 16th Baroness Wentworth (1873–1957), peer, Arabian horse breeder and real tennis player
- Neville Bulwer-Lytton, 3rd Earl of Lytton (1879–1951), military officer, Olympian and artist
- Sir Peter Bottomley (born 1944), Conservative Member of Parliament
- Virginia Bottomley, Baroness Bottomley of Nettlestone (born 1948), Conservative peer and former Secretary of State for Health
- Sir George Deacon (1906–1984), oceanographer
- Sir James Gault (1902–1977), military assistant to General Dwight Eisenhower during WWII
- Mark Gravett (1865-1938), Hampshire cricketer
- Sir Laurence Guillemard (1862–1951), Governor of the Straits Settlements
- Richard Harvey (1864–1944), Archdeacon of Halifax
- Francis Holl (1815–1884), engraver
- Dame Penelope Keith (1940–2026), actress
- Robert Kinglake (1843–1915), rower and barrister
- Mark Lambert (born 1985), Harlequins rugby player
- George Luker (1841-1902), painter
- Jamie Mackie (born 1985), Queens Park Rangers and Scotland footballer
- Humphry Osmond (1917–2004), psychiatrist
- Beresford Potter (1853–1931), Archdeacon in Cyprus and Syria
- Nora S. Unwin (1907–1982), children's author and illustrator
- John Dawson Watson (1832–1892), painter
- Bob Wyatt (1901–1995), England cricketer

== In popular culture ==
In 1970 the Doctor Who serial - Doctor Who and the Silurians was partly filmed at Milford Hospital. In the series it was called the Wenley Hospital. The actual filming took place in November 1969.

Milford is mentioned in Aldous Huxley's book Brave New World.
