= Great Scott – It's Maynard! =

British television comedy series (1955–1956)

Great Scott – It's Maynard! is a British television series which aired on the BBC from 1955 to 1956. It was a popular comedy sketch series starring Bill Maynard and Terry Scott, with musical guests including Petula Clark. It was produced by Duncan Wood, and written by Lewis Schwarz, Eric Merriman, Dave Freeman and Johnny Speight.

Although telerecording existed, none of the episodes are known to remain in the BBC archives.

== Cast ==
- Terry Scott
- Bill Maynard
- Shirley Eaton
- Hugh Lloyd
- Pat Coombs
- Marie Benson
- Gary Wayne
- Dennis Chinnery
- The Coronets
