= David Nathan (journalist) =

British journalist (1926–2001)

David Nathan (9 December 1926 – 21 April 2001) was a British journalist.

Born in Manchester, he joined the Daily Herald in 1955. Initially employed as a general reporter, he became a drama critic and entertainment writer on the newspaper. From 1962 he was a contributor to satirical comedy programmes broadcast by BBC television, including That Was The Week That Was on which he collaborated with Dennis Potter during 1963.

By the 1970s he was a drama critic on The Jewish Chronicle and became the newspaper's deputy editor in 1985 remaining in the post until 2001.

Nathan co-wrote the first biography of Tony Hancock with the comedian's second wife Freddie – the first edition of this book was published in 1969. He also wrote biographies of the actors John Hurt and Glenda Jackson

== Works ==
- Hancock, Freddie Ross; Nathan, David (1969). Hancock. London: William Kimber & Co. (Thorsons). (registration required)
