= Alec Bregonzi =

English actor (1930–2006)

- Born: Alec John Bregonzi; 21 April 1930; London, England
- Died: 4 June 2006 (aged 76); London
- Occupation: Actor

Alec John Bregonzi (21 April 1930 – 4 June 2006) was an English actor who appeared in a number of stage and television roles.

== Life and career ==
Born in London, Bregonzi began his career as a professional actor in 1955 in repertory theatre in Farnham, then in York, Bromley and Leatherhead, amongst other places. Work in the West End followed, in Tennessee Williams's Camino Real, where he played two parts and understudied Ronnie Barker.

In 1957, Bregonzi appeared in Hancock's Half Hour for the first time. He went on to appear in 22 of the 63 television episodes Tony Hancock made for BBC Television. In 1958, Bregonzi toured with Hancock, and they performed the famous "Budgerigar" sketch together on tour and in the Royal Variety Performance and on television (in Christmas Night with the Stars). They toured together again in 1961. Duncan Wood, the television director of Hancock's Half Hour recommended Bregonzi to other directors, so that he also appeared in 1950s/60s shows starring Benny Hill, Charlie Drake, Arthur Askey, Ted Ray, Frankie Howerd, Harry Worth, Jimmy Logan, and Alan Melville, among others.

Later on, Bregonzi worked with comedians Cannon and Ball, Kenny Everett, Hale and Pace, Little and Large, Kelly Monteith, and on half a dozen occasions in the television series The Two Ronnies (with Ronnie Barker and Ronnie Corbett) and Filthy Rich and Catflap (1987, with Rik Mayall, Adrian Edmondson and Nigel Planer). In 'straight' television, he appeared in The Recruiting Officer (Play of the Month, 1973), The Mayor of Casterbridge (1978), Don Camillo (1981), Great Expectations (1981), The Barchester Chronicles (1982), Mapp & Lucia (1986), London's Burning (1988), A Royal Scandal (1997), and Happiness (2001), his last screen role.

Bregonzi read viewers' letters for BBC TV's Points of View, hosted by Robert Robinson and later Barry Took, which led to a radio series Joke By Joke, compiled by Took. He also appeared in radio comedy with Kenneth Connor, Richard Briers and others. In 1995–1997, he played the voice parts of several characters in the puppet series The Treacle People.

He appeared in several films, including the French film L'Etincelle (1986), which he regarded as his best film part. Bregonzi's extensive acting work included television commercials, both in the UK and abroad. A great opera fan, he was frequently to be seen in the audience at fringe London opera productions.

== Filmography ==
Year	Title	Role	Notes
1958	Carry On Sergeant	First Storesman	
1963	Ricochet	Max	
1964	Downfall	Minor Role	Uncredited
1966	Georgy Girl	Beauty Salon Manager	Uncredited
1969	Cry Wolf	Sound man	
1969	School for Sex	Harry	
1970	Cool It Carol!	Camp Man	
1971	Carry On at Your Convenience	Photographer	(scenes deleted)
1978	Revenge of the Pink Panther	Douvier's Board member #1	
1986	L'étincelle		
1989	Queen of Hearts	Headwaiter	
