= Alan Simpson (scriptwriter) =

British screenwriter (1929–2017)

Alan Simpson OBE
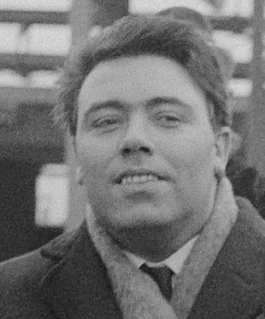
- Simpson in 1964
- Born: Alan Francis Simpson; 27 November 1929; Brixton, London, England
- Died: 8 February 2017 (aged 87)
- Occupation: Scriptwriter
- Writing career
- Period: 1954–1979
- Genre: Television
- Notable works: Hancock's Half Hour, Hancock (1954–1961); Comedy Playhouse (1961–63, 1974); Steptoe and Son (1962–74)

Alan Francis Simpson (27 November 1929 – 8 February 2017) was an English scriptwriter. He was best known as part of the Galton and Simpson comedy writing partnership with Ray Galton. Together they devised and wrote the BBC sitcom Hancock's Half Hour (1954–1961), the first two series of Comedy Playhouse (1961–1963), and Steptoe and Son (1962–1974).

== Early life ==
Simpson was born in Brixton, South London, and was educated at Mitcham County Grammar School for Boys. He was a football fan and supported Brentford and Hampton & Richmond Borough where Simpson was honorary club president. After leaving school he worked as a shipping clerk and was a member of a church concert party. He contracted tuberculosis aged 17 in 1947 and was admitted to Milford Sanatorium near Godalming in Surrey, where he spent 13 months.

== Galton and Simpson ==
While at the Milford Sanatorium, Simpson was housed with fellow patient Ray Galton, also 17 at the time. The two found they shared similar tastes in comedy, and quickly became friends. After leaving the sanatorium, they jointly applied and got jobs at the BBC, writing sketches for its various comedians. One of the plotlines in Linda Grant's 2016 novel The Dark Circle was based on Simpson's experience of broadcasting on hospital radio with Galton during their time at the sanatorium and its role in their subsequent careers.

Following their break with the Derek Roy vehicle Happy Go Lucky, they became writers for Tony Hancock, including the Hancock's Half Hour radio show and Hancock's later television specials. Subsequently, the pair wrote several comedy series for television, including Comedy Playhouse and Steptoe and Son. The latter became the basis for the American series Sanford and Son and the Swedish series Albert & Herbert. Many of their works were re-adopted for later production, such as the Paul Merton revival of the Hancock's Half Hour for ITV, and the 2009 audio plays Galton and Simpson's Half Hour broadcast on BBC Radio 2 to celebrate the team's 60th anniversary.

Galton and Simpson continued to write for other one-off comedies and series until Simpson's retirement in 1978, after which the two remained in contact.

== Personal life ==
Simpson was married to Kathleen (Kate) Phillips (1958-1978) until her death.

== Later life ==
Simpson retired from scriptwriting in 1978 around the time Kathleen, his first wife, died. He then concentrated on business interests and becoming an after dinner speaker. He was appointed an OBE in 2000, and he and Galton received a BAFTA Fellowship on 8 May 2016 for their comedic contributions.

Simpson died on 8 February 2017, as a result of lung disease, at the age of 87. After his death, his manager Tessa Le Bars said: "Having had the privilege of working with Alan and Ray for over 50 years, the last 40 as agent, business manager and friend, and latterly as Alan's companion and carer, I am deeply saddened to lose Alan after a brave battle with lung disease."

On 11 February 2017 BBC Two broadcast the Steptoe and Son episode "Divided We Stand" in his memory.
