= Hugh Lloyd =

British actor (1923–2008)

Hugh Lloyd MBE
- Born: Hugh Lewis Lloyd; 22 April 1923; Chester, Cheshire, England
- Died: 14 July 2008 (aged 85); Worthing, Sussex, England
- Occupation: Actor
- Years active: 1957–2005
- Spouses: Anne Rodgers (m. 1948; div. 1950); Mavis Polley (divorced); Carole Wilkinson (m. 1969, divorced); Shän Davies (m. 1983–2008)

Hugh Lewis Lloyd MBE (22 April 1923 – 14 July 2008) was an English actor who made his name in film and television comedy from the 1960s to the 1980s. He was best known for appearances in Hancock's Half Hour, Hugh and I and other sitcoms of the 1960s.

== Life and career ==
Lloyd was born on 22 April 1923 in Chester, Cheshire and attended the King's School. After leaving school he spent two years as a newspaper reporter on the Chester Chronicle.

His first professional acting appearance was with ENSA and he worked in repertory theatres until 1957, when he made the first of 25 appearances in the television series Hancock's Half Hour. Many years after its first transmission, he is still remembered as the character in the episode entitled The Blood Donor in which he forgets to return Tony Hancock's wine gums.

He appeared with Terry Scott in the series Hugh and I and The Gnomes of Dulwich; with Peggy Mount in Lollipop Loves Mr Mole; in Jury and You Rang, M'Lord?. He created the series Lord Tramp (1977), written by Michael Pertwee, in which he also starred. The Comedy Playhouse episode, Hughie, in which he starred as a recently released prisoner following the ending of Hugh and I, was unsuccessful.

Television plays in which he appeared include She's Been Away (starring Peggy Ashcroft); The Dunroamin' Rising; A Matter Of Will (with Brenda Bruce); and a number of Alan Bennett plays, such as A Visit From Miss Protheroe (with Patricia Routledge), Say Something Happened (with Julie Walters and Thora Hird), and Me, I'm Afraid Of Virginia Woolf. He played Goronwy Jones in the Doctor Who story Delta and the Bannermen and appeared in numerous television light entertainment shows, including Victoria Wood, Jimmy Cricket and Babble Quiz.

On the West End stage, Lloyd spent three seasons at the Windmill Theatre; a year at the Strand Theatre in When We Are Married; two years in No Sex Please, We're British at the Strand; and at the Lyric Theatre in Tonight at 8.30. He was part of the Royal National Theatre company under Ian McKellen, in The Critic, The Cherry Orchard and The Duchess of Malfi. He also performed in over twenty pantomimes.

== Personal life and death ==
Lloyd was married at least four times. He met his first wife, Anne Rodgers, at ENSA; they married in 1948 and divorced in 1950. He also married his pianist, Mavis Polley, in the late 1950s, and Carole Wilkinson in 1969. Some sources at the time of his death also state that he was married to a musician named José Stewart after Rodgers.

Lloyd met journalist Shan Lloyd, at Allen's restaurant in London's West End, in 1978. In his autobiography, he described his future wife as "a scatty, blondehaired Fleet Street tabloid journalist". Hugh and Shan married in 1983. The couple moved to Worthing in 2003.

Lloyd was awarded an MBE in the 2005 New Year Honours List for his services to drama and charity.

He died on 14 July 2008 at his home in Dolphin Court, Grand Avenue, West Worthing. Shan Lloyd died in December 2008, just five months after her husband.

== Appearances ==
=== Films ===
- The Rebel (1961) – Man on Train
- Go to Blazes (1962) – Fireman
- It's Trad Dad! (1962) – Usher
- She'll Have To Go (1962) – Macdonald
- The Mouse on the Moon (1963) – Plumber
- Father Came Too! (1963) – Mary, Queen of Scots
- The Punch and Judy Man (1963) – Edward Cox
- Just for Fun (1963) – Burglar
- Runaway Railway (1965) – Disposals Man
- White Cargo (1973) – Chumley
- Intimate Games (1976) – John's Father
- Quadrophenia (1979) – Mr. Cale
- Venom (1982) – Taxi Driver
- She's Been Away (1989) – George
- The Fool (1990) – Viscount
- August (1996) – Thomas Prosser
- The Clandestine Marriage (1998) – Reverend Parker
- Alice in Wonderland (1999) – Fishface Footman
- Girl from Rio (2001) – Albert

=== Television ===
- Doc Martin (2005) – "Aromatherapy" (Series 2, Episode 4) – Vernon Cooke
- Foyle's War (2002) – "Eagle Day" (Series 1, Episode 4) – Frank Watson
- My Hero (2000) – "My Hero Christmas" (Series 1, Episode 7) – Santa
- So What Now? (2001) – "The House Guest" (Episode 4) – Frank
- Randall & Hopkirk (Deceased) (2000) – "A Man of Substance" (Series 1, Episode 6)
- Great Expectations (1999) – The Aged P
- Cider with Rosie (1998) – Joseph Brown
- Heartbeat Pig in the Middle (1997) – Archie Birley
- Oh, Doctor Beeching! (1997) – Ernie Bennett
- Blue Heaven (1994) – cleaner
- You Rang, M'Lord? (BBC1, 1991) Selfridge, Sir Ralph Shawcross's butler
- Boon (1991) – "Trial And Error" (1991) – George Jenkins
- Victoria Wood (1989) – Jim
- The Play on One – The Dunroamin' Rising (1988) – Wattie
- Doctor Who – Delta and the Bannermen (1987) – Goronwy Jones
- Victoria Wood: As Seen on TV (1986) – Billy
- That's My Boy (1984) – "Unfair Dismissal" (Season 3, Episode 5) – Jim Barnes
- Cat's Eyes (1985) – "Something Nasty Down Below" – Charlie
- Last of the Summer Wine – The Waist Land (1983) – Alex
- Say Something Happened (1982) – Arthur Rhodes
- A Visit From Miss Protheroe (1978)
- Lord Tramp (1975) – Lord Tramp
- Lollipop (1972)
- Lollipop Loves Mr Mole (1971)
- The Gnomes of Dulwich (1969)
- Hugh and I (1962)
- Hancock's Half Hour / Hancock (1957–61) – various roles
- Great Scott - It's Maynard! (1955–56)
