= Ray Galton =

British screenwriter (1930–2018)

Ray Galton OBE
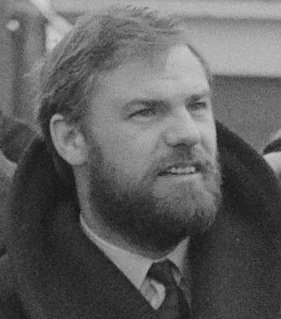
- Galton in 1964
- Born: Raymond Percy Galton; 17 July 1930; Paddington, London, England
- Died: 5 October 2018 (aged 88); Paddington, London, England
- Occupation: Scriptwriter
- Spouse: Tonia Phillips (1956–95, her death)
- Writing career
- Period: 1954–1997
- Genre: Television
- Notable works: Hancock's Half Hour, Hancock (1954–61); Comedy Playhouse (1961–63, 1974); Steptoe and Son (1962–74).

Raymond Percy Galton (17 July 1930 – 5 October 2018) was an English radio and television scriptwriter. He was best known as part of the Galton and Simpson comedy writing partnership with Alan Simpson. Together they devised and wrote 1950s and 60s BBC sitcoms including Hancock's Half Hour (1954–61), the first two series of Comedy Playhouse (1961–63), and Steptoe and Son (1962–74).

== Early life ==
Galton was born in Paddington, West London, on 17 July 1930. After leaving school, he worked for the Transport and General Workers Union. He contracted tuberculosis in 1948 and was admitted to Milford Sanatorium near Godalming in Surrey, where he met fellow patient Alan Simpson.

== Later career ==
Alan Simpson retired from scriptwriting in 1978 to concentrate on his business interests. Galton then often worked with writer Johnny Speight on scripts, including Spooner's Patch (1979–82) about a corrupt police station. Galton also wrote scripts for sitcoms produced in Germany and Scandinavia. He co-wrote the ITV series Room at the Bottom (1986–88) about television executives. His last sitcom was Get Well Soon in 1997, which he co-created with playwright John Antrobus and was based on his own experiences in a sanatorium. In October 2005, Galton and Antrobus premiered their play Steptoe and Son in Murder at Oil Drum Lane at the York Theatre Royal.

== Honours and awards ==
Galton won two BAFTA awards and a British Comedy Award, among many others. He accepted an OBE in 2000, and he and Alan Simpson received a BAFTA Fellowship on 8 May 2016.

== Personal life and death ==
Galton married Tonia Phillips in 1956, and they had three children; she died from cancer in 1995. He died in his sleep at a family home after a long period suffering from dementia on 5 October 2018.

Galton's manager said in a statement that "I have had the great honour of working with Ray for over 50 years and for the last 40 as his manager and friend. With his lifelong co-writer, the late Alan Simpson, they were regarded as the Fathers and creators of British sitcom. The end of an iconic era, but the legacy of Hancock's Half Hour, Steptoe and Son and over 600 scripts is huge. They will endure, inspire and bring laughter to the nation for evermore."
