= Tony Hancock =

English comedian and actor (1924–1968)

- Hancock c. 1963
- Born: Anthony John Hancock; 12 May 1924; Hall Green, Birmingham, England
- Died: 25 June 1968 (aged 44); Bellevue Hill, New South Wales, Australia
- Occupations: Actor; comedian
- Years active: 1942–1968
- Spouses: Cicely J. E. Romanis (m. 1950; div. 1965); Freda "Freddie" Ross (m. 1965)

Anthony John Hancock (12 May 1924 – 25 June 1968) was an English comedian and actor.

High-profile during the 1950s and early 1960s, he had a major success with his BBC series Hancock's Half Hour, first broadcast on radio from 1954, then on television from 1956, in which he soon formed a strong professional and personal bond with comic actor Sid James. Although Hancock's decision to cease working with James disappointed many when it became known in early 1960, his last BBC series in 1961 contains some of his best-remembered work (including "The Blood Donor" and "The Radio Ham"). After breaking with his scriptwriters Ray Galton and Alan Simpson later that year, his career declined.

Across his career, Hancock twice won the BAFTA Award for Light Entertainment Artist in 1958 and 1960. He was later nominated for the BAFTA Award for Most Promising Newcomer to Leading Film Roles for his performance in The Rebel (1961).

== Early life and career ==
Hancock was born in Southam Road, Hall Green, Birmingham, the second of three sons of Jack and Lily Hancock (née Thomas). His father, Jack, worked for a shipping firm while his mother, Lily, was the daughter of a printer who served 21 years as a director of Birmingham City Football Club.

In April 1927, in an effort to improve his health, Jack moved to Bournemouth with his family. There they bought the Mayo Hygienic Laundry in Winton but the next year they moved to the Railway Hotel in Holdenhurst Road of which Jack had become the licensee.

In 1933, Hancock's parents bought Swanmore Villa and Lodge in Gervis Road, which they renamed to the Durlston Court Hotel, after Durlston Court Preparatory School, now called the Celebrity Hotel. After his father's death in 1934, Hancock and his brothers (Colin and Roger Thomas) lived there with their mother and stepfather Robert Gordon Walker. The young Anthony was sent to board at Durlston Court School, Swanage, from 1936. He learned typing and shorthand at Bournemouth Municipal College at the Lansdowne and later applied to be a newspaper reporter in Birmingham.

Hancock attended Summerbee Infants, Saugeen Preparatory School in Derby Road, Durlston Court Preparatory School, part of Durlston boarding school near Swanage (the name of which his parents adopted for their hotel) and Bradfield College in Reading, Berkshire, but left school at the age of fifteen. He made his stage debut in the hall of the Church of the Sacred Heart on Richmond Hill in 1940, billed as "Anthony Hancock – The Confidential Comic". In 1940, Hancock made his first professional appearance at The Labour Halls (now the Avon Social Club), in Avon Road, Springbourne, in Bournemouth. During the war, Hancock was billeted to the Hotel Metropole in Holdenhurst Road while attached to the Royal Canadian Air Force photographic interpretation unit.

In 1942, during the Second World War, Hancock joined the RAF Regiment. Following failed auditions for the Entertainments National Service Association (ENSA), he joined the Gang Shows, travelling around Europe entertaining troops. After the war, he joined the Ralph Reader Gang Show touring production of "Wings". He later worked in a double act with musician Derek Scott at the Windmill Theatre, a venue which helped to launch the careers of many comedians at the time. A favourable press review of his work at the Windmill was seen in July 1948. "But mention must made of a new young comedian ... who with a piano partner, gives some brilliant thumbnail impressions of a 'dud' concert party." He took part in radio shows such as Workers' Playtime and Variety Bandbox. In July 1949, he was praised for his work in the summer presentation of "Flotsam's Follies" at the Esplanade Concert Hall, Bognor Regis. Christmas 1949 saw him in the part of "Buttons" in the Cinderella pantomime at the Royal Artillery, Woolwich. In June 1950, he opened in the "Ocean Revue" at the Ocean, Clacton Pier which ran for three months. In December 1950, Hancock was in the "Red Riding Hood" pantomime at the Theatre Royal Nottingham playing the part of Jolly Jenkins, the Baron's page.

In 1951–1952, for one series beginning on August 3, 1951, Hancock was a cast member of Educating Archie, in which he mainly played the tutor (or foil) to the nominal star, a ventriloquist's dummy. His appearance in this radio show brought him national recognition, and a catchphrase he used frequently in the show, "Flippin' kids!", became popular parlance. The same year, he began to make regular appearances on BBC Television's light entertainment show Kaleidoscope, and almost starred in his own series to be written by Larry Stephens, Hancock's best man at his first wedding. In 1954, he was given his own eponymous BBC radio show, Hancock's Half Hour.

== Peak years ==
Hancock on the cover of Radio Times, 1954

Working with scripts from Ray Galton and Alan Simpson, Hancock's Half Hour lasted for seven years and over a hundred episodes in its radio form, and, from 1956, ran concurrently with an equally successful BBC television series with the same name. The show starred Hancock as "Anthony Aloysius St John Hancock", living in the shabby "23 Railway Cuttings" in East Cheam. Most episodes portrayed his everyday life as a struggling comedian with aspirations toward straight acting. Some episodes, however, changed this to show him as being a successful actor and/or comedian, or occasionally as having a different career completely, such as a struggling (and incompetent) barrister. Radio episodes were prone to more surreal storylines, which would have been impractical on television, such as in "The Pet Dog" (1955), in which Hancock buys a puppy that grows to be as tall as himself.

Sid James featured in both the radio and TV versions, while the radio version also included regulars Bill Kerr, Kenneth Williams and, successively, Moira Lister, Andrée Melly and Hattie Jacques. The series rejected the variety format then dominant in British radio comedy and instead used a form drawn more from everyday life: the situation comedy, with the humour coming from the characters and the circumstances in which they find themselves. Owing to a contractual wrangle with producer Jack Hylton, Hancock had an ITV series, The Tony Hancock Show, during this period, which ran in 1956–57.

During the run of his BBC radio and television series, Hancock became an enormous star in Britain. Unlike most other comedians at the time, he was able to clear the streets while families gathered together to listen to the eagerly awaited episodes. His character changed slightly over the series, but even in the earliest episodes the key facets of "the lad himself" were evident. "Sunday Afternoon at Home" and "The Wild Man of the Woods" were top-rating shows and were later released on an LP record.

As an actor with considerable experience in films, Sid James became more important to the show when the television version began. The regular cast was reduced to just the two men, allowing the humour to come from the interaction between them. James's character was the most real of the two, puncturing Hancock's pretensions. His character would often be dishonest and exploit Hancock's apparent gullibility during the radio series, but in the television version there appeared to be a more genuine friendship between them. Hancock's highly strung personality made the demands of live broadcasts a constant worry, with the result that, starting from the autumn 1959 series, all episodes of the series were recorded before transmission. Up until then, every British television comedy show had been performed live, owing to the technical limitations of the time. He was also the first performer to receive a £1,000 fee for his performances in a half-hour show.

Hancock became anxious that his work with James was turning them into a double act, and he told close associates in late 1959, just after the fifth television series had finished being recorded, that he would end his professional association with Sid James after a final series. Hancock left others to tell James. His last BBC series in 1961, retitled simply Hancock, was without James. Two episodes are among his best-remembered: "The Blood Donor", in which he goes to a clinic to give blood, contains some famous lines, including "I don't mind giving a reasonable amount, but a pint! That's very nearly an armful!"; in "The Radio Ham", Hancock plays an amateur radio enthusiast who receives a mayday call from a yachtsman in distress, but his incompetence prevents him from taking his position. Both of these programmes were re-recorded a few months later for a commercial 1961 LP, produced in the same manner as the radio episodes.

Returning home with his wife from recording "The Bowmans", an episode based around a parody of The Archers, Hancock was involved in a car accident and was thrown through the windscreen. He was not badly hurt, but suffered concussion and was unable to learn his lines for "The Blood Donor", the next show due to be recorded. The result was that his performance depended on the use of teleprompters, and he is seen looking away from other actors when delivering lines. From this time onwards, Hancock came to rely on teleprompters instead of learning scripts whenever he had career difficulties.

== Introspection ==
In early 1960, Hancock appeared on the BBC's Face to Face, a half-hour in-depth interview programme conducted by former Labour MP John Freeman. Freeman asked Hancock many soul-searching questions about his life and work. Hancock, who deeply admired his interviewer, often appeared uncomfortable with the questions, but answered them frankly and honestly. Hancock had always been highly self-critical, and it is often argued that this interview heightened this tendency, contributing to his later difficulties. According to Roger, his brother, "It was the biggest mistake he ever made. I think it all started from that really. ... Self-analysis—that was his killer."

Cited as evidence is his gradual ostracism of those who contributed to his success, such as Sid James and his scriptwriters, Galton and Simpson. His reasoning was that, to refine his craft, he had to ditch catch-phrases and become realistic. He argued, for example, that whenever an ad-hoc character was needed, such as a policeman, it would be played by someone like Kenneth Williams, who would appear with his well-known oily catchphrase "Good evening". Hancock believed the comedy suffered because people did not believe in the policeman, knowing it was just Williams doing a funny voice.

== Break with Galton and Simpson ==
Hancock starred in the film The Rebel (1961), in which he plays the role of an office worker-turned-artist who finds himself successful after a move to Paris, but only as the result of mistaken identity. Although a success in Britain, the film was not well received in the United States: owing to a contemporary American television series of the same name, the film was retitled Call Me Genius and was not well received by American critics.

According to his agent, Beryl Vertue, his break with Galton and Simpson took place at a meeting held in October 1961, where he also broke with her. Alan Simpson remembered that the break occurred during a telephone call and that only Beryl's position was discussed at the meeting. During the previous six months, the writers had developed—without payment and in consultation with the comedian—three scripts for Hancock's second starring film vehicle. Worried that the projects were wrong for him, the first two had been abandoned incomplete; the third was written to completion at the writers' insistence, only for Hancock to reject it. It is believed that he had not read any of the screenplays. The result of the break was that he chose separately to develop something previously discussed, and the writers were ultimately commissioned to write a Comedy Playhouse series for the BBC, one of which, "The Offer", emerged as the pilot for Steptoe and Son. That "something previously discussed" became The Punch and Judy Man, for which Hancock hired writer Philip Oakes, who moved in with the comedian to co-write the screenplay.

In The Punch and Judy Man (1963), Hancock plays a struggling seaside entertainer who dreams of a better life; Sylvia Syms plays his nagging social climber of a wife, and John Le Mesurier a sand sculptor. The extent to which the character played by Hancock had merged with his real personality is clear in the film, which owes much to his memories of his childhood in Bournemouth.

== Later years ==
Hancock moved to ATV in 1962 with different writers, though Oakes, retained as an advisor, disagreed over script ideas and the two men severed their professional (but not personal) relationship. The initial writer of Hancock's ATV series, Godfrey Harrison, had scripted the successful George Cole radio series A Life Of Bliss, and also Hancock's first regular television appearances on Fools Rush In (a segment of Kaleidoscope) more than a decade earlier. Harrison had trouble meeting deadlines, so other writers were commissioned, including Terry Nation.

The ATV series was transmitted in early 1963, on the same evenings as the second series of Steptoe and Son, written by Hancock's former writers, Galton and Simpson. Critical comparisons did not favour Hancock's series. Around 1965, Hancock made a series of 11 television adverts for the Egg Marketing Board. Hancock starred in the adverts with Patricia Hayes as the character "Mrs Crevatte" in an attempt to revive the Galton and Simpson style of scripts. Slightly earlier, in 1963, he had featured in a spoof Hancock Report—hired by Lord Beeching to promote his plan to reduce railway mileage in newspaper advertisements and posters. A pamphlet featuring Hancock entitled The Truth About the Railways – The Hancock report was also published by the British Railways Board. Hancock reportedly wanted to be paid what Beeching was paid annually—£34,000; he was offered half that amount for his services.

Hancock continued to make regular appearances on British television until 1967, including a 50-minute show for BBC2 from the Royal Festival Hall, which was poorly received. By then his alcoholism was seriously affecting his performances. Two unsuccessful variety series for ABC Weekend TV, The Blackpool Show (1966) and Hancock's (1967), were his last work for British television. He tried a role in a Disney film—The Adventures of Bullwhip Griffin—but was sacked after reportedly having trouble with the mock-Shakespearian dialogue. He collapsed with acute liver failure on 1 January 1967 and was told he would die within three months if he continued drinking.

In December 1967, while recovering from a broken rib from a drunken fall, he became ill with pneumonia. His final television appearances were in Australia under a contract to make a 13-part series for the Seven Network. However, after arriving in Australia in March 1968, he completed only three programmes before his death and they remained unaired for nearly four years. These shows are the only existing television footage of him in colour, as all his previous shows had been made for black-and-white television.

== Personal life ==
In June 1950 Hancock married Cicely Romanis, a Lanvin model, after a brief courtship.

Freddie Ross worked as his publicist from 1954 and became more involved in his life, eventually becoming his mistress. He divorced Cicely in 1965 and married Ross in December of that year. This second marriage was short-lived. During these years Hancock was also involved with Joan Le Mesurier (née Malin), the new wife of actor John Le Mesurier, Hancock's best friend and a regular supporting character-actor from his television series. Joan was later to describe the relationship in her book Lady Don't Fall Backwards, including the claim that her husband readily forgave the affair; he is quoted as saying that if it had been anyone else he would not have understood it, but with Tony Hancock it made sense. In July 1966 Freddie took an overdose but survived. Arriving in Blackpool to record an edition of his variety series, Hancock was met by pressmen asking about his wife's attempted suicide. Freddie was granted a decree nisi a few days before Hancock's own suicide but divorce proceedings were not finalised and she became his widow.

Cicely developed her own problems with alcohol and died from a fall in 1969, the year after the death of her former husband. Freddie Hancock survived her broken marriage and resumed her career as a prominent publicist and agent in the film and television industry. Based in New York City for many years, she founded the East Coast chapter of BAFTA, the British Academy of Film and Television Arts.

== Death ==
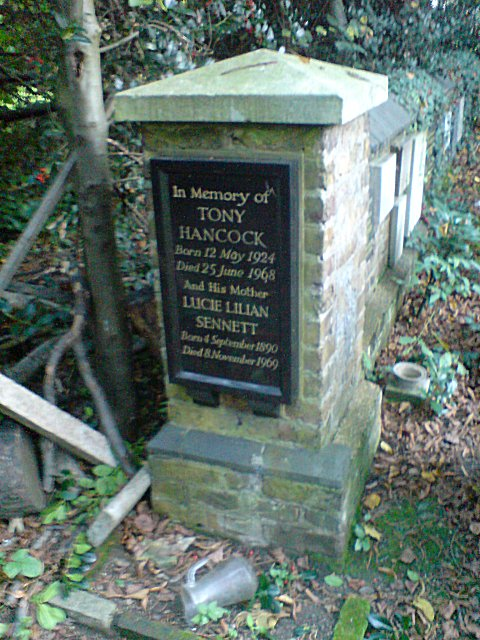
Memorial plaque to Hancock and his mother in the churchyard of St Dunstan's Church, Cranford, where their ashes are buried

Hancock died by overdose, in Sydney, on 25 June 1968, aged 44. His death was ruled as a suicide. He was found dead in his Bellevue Hill flat with an empty vodka bottle and a scattering of amobarbital tablets.

In one of his suicide notes he wrote: "Things just seemed to go too wrong too many times." His ashes were taken to England by satirist Willie Rushton and were buried at St Dunstan's Church in Cranford, London.

Asked by Van Morrison about his relationship with Hancock, Spike Milligan commented in 1989: "Very difficult man to get on with. He used to drink excessively. You felt sorry for him. He ended up on his own. I thought, he's got rid of everybody else, he's going to get rid of himself and he did."

== Legacy ==
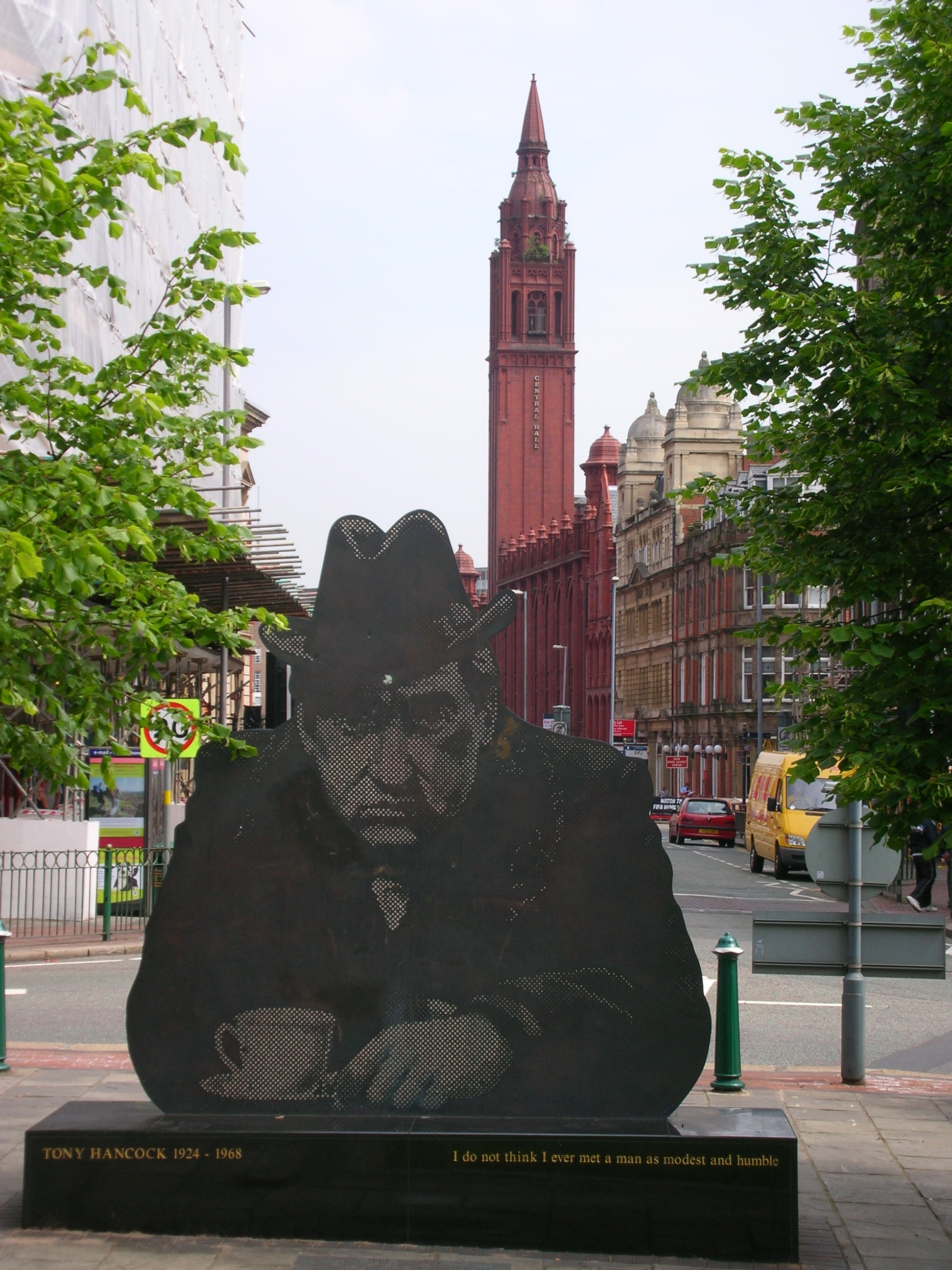
Sculpture in Old Square, Birmingham

Commemorative plaque at the foot of the sculpture

There is a sculpture of Hancock by Bruce Williams, erected in 1996, in Old Square, Corporation Street, Birmingham.

Commemorative blue plaque in South Kensington

There is a plaque on the house where he was born in Hall Green, Birmingham, and a plaque on the wall of the hotel in Bournemouth where he spent some of his early life. There is also a plaque, placed by the Dead Comics Society, at 10 Grey Close, Hampstead Garden Suburb, north London, where he lived in 1947 and 1948. In 2014, an English Heritage blue plaque was placed to commemorate Hancock at 20 Queen's Gate Place in South Kensington, London, where he lived between 1952 and 1958. The Tony Hancock Appreciation Society organised a plaque to commemorate Hancock's first professional appearance, in 1940, at the Labour Halls, now the Avon Social Club in Avon Road, Springbourne, in Bournemouth.

In a 2002 poll, BBC radio listeners voted Hancock their favourite British comedian. Commenting on this poll, Ray Galton and Alan Simpson observed that modern-day creations such as Alan Partridge and David Brent owed much of their success to mimicking dominant features of Tony Hancock's character. "The thing they've all got in common is self-delusion," they remarked, in a statement issued by the BBC. "They all think they're more intelligent than everyone else, more cultured, that people don't recognise their true greatness—self-delusion in every sense. And there's nothing people like better than failure."

Mary Kalemkerian, Head of Programmes for BBC 7, commented: "Classic comedians such as Tony Hancock and the Goons are obviously still firm favourites with BBC radio listeners. Age doesn't seem to matter—if it's funny, it's funny." Dan Peat of the Tony Hancock Appreciation Society said of the poll: "It's fantastic news. If he was alive, he would have taken it one of two ways. He would probably have made some kind of dry crack, but in truth he would have been chuffed."

The last eight or so years of Hancock's life were the subject of a BBC1 television film, called Hancock (1991), starring Alfred Molina. Another drama, Kenneth Williams: Fantabulosa! (BBC Four, 2006), saw Martin Trenaman play the role of Hancock with Michael Sheen as Williams. Hancock's affair with Joan Le Mesurier was also dramatised in Hancock and Joan on BBC Four and transmitted in 2008 as part of the "Curse of Comedy" season. Hancock was portrayed by Ken Stott and Joan by Maxine Peake.

Musician Pete Doherty is a fan of Hancock and named the first album by his band the Libertines Up the Bracket after one of Hancock's catchphrases. He also wrote a song called "Lady Don't Fall Backwards" after the book at the centre of the Hancock's Half Hour episode "The Missing Page". Hancock is also referenced in the lyrics to the Libertines' 2015 song "You're My Waterloo".

Paul Merton, in 1996, appeared in remakes of six of Galton and Simpson's Hancock scripts, which were not critically well received. In 2014, five of the radio instalments of Hancock's Half Hour that did not survive, chosen by Galton and Simpson, were re-staged for BBC Radio 4 under the umbrella title The Missing Hancocks, with Kevin McNally taking the title role. Over subsequent years, all the remaining missing episodes were re-made, including two episodes, "The Marriage Bureau" and "A Visit to Swansea", where the original broadcasts were later discovered and broadcast.

Playwright Roy Smiles' play about Tony Hancock, The Lad Himself, was staged at the Edinburgh Festival Fringe in 2012 with Mark Brailsford as Tony Hancock.

The Tony Hancock Appreciation Society was formed in 1976 and still attracts new members. In 1980, Chris Bumstead began publishing a monthly Tony Hancock Appreciation Society newsletter, Railway Cuttings, later quarterly. Now the Society publishes two magazines for members, The Missing Page (quarterly) and a digital only supplement The Bonus Pages, holds an annual reunion dinner, lately in the West Midlands near Hancock's birth place, and has worked with TV and radio producers, authors, journalists and DVD and CD companies to provide authoritative information. It has an extensive archive held in the safe keeping of De Montfort University, Leicester. The society's patrons are Lucy Hancock, Tony Hancock's great-niece, and Kevin McNally, who plays Hancock in The Missing Hancocks.

== Recordings ==
Episodes and anthologies from the radio series were released on vinyl LP in the 1960s, as well as four re-makes of television scripts; an annual LP was issued of radio episodes (without the incidental music) between 1980 and 1984. Much of this material was also available on cassette in later years.

The BBC issued CDs of the surviving 74 radio episodes in six box sets, one per series, with the sixth box containing several out-of-series specials. This was followed by the release of one large box set containing all the others in a special presentation case; while it includes no extra material, the larger box alone (without any CDs) still fetches high prices on online marketplaces like eBay, where Hancock memorabilia remains a thriving industry. There have also been numerous VHS releases of the BBC television series.

While five separate Region 2 DVDs were previously issued, some of the surviving episodes were unavailable until The Tony Hancock BBC Collection (eight DVDs) appeared in 2007. Episodes of the radio series are often broadcast on the digital radio station BBC Radio 4 Extra.

== Film appearances ==
Year	Title	Role	Notes
1954	Orders Are Orders	Lt. Wilfred Cartroad	
1961	The Rebel	Anthony Hancock	US title: Call Me Genius
1963	The Punch and Judy Man	Wally Pinner	
1965	Those Magnificent Men in Their Flying Machines	Harry Popperwell	
1966	The Wrong Box	Detective	

== Biographical texts ==
- Hancock, Freddie Ross; Nathan, David (1969). Hancock. London: William Kimber & Co. (Thorsons) – via archive.org. (registration required)
- Wilmut, Roger (1978). Tony Hancock "artiste": A Tony Hancock Companion. Eyre Methuen – via archive.org. (registration required)

with details of Hancock's stage, radio, TV and film appearances

- Edward Joffe Hancock's Last Stand: The Series That Never Was, June 1998, foreword by June Whitfield, Book Guild Ltd Publishing, ISBN 1-85776-316-5

an account of Hancock's final days, written by the man who found Hancock's body after his suicide

- Goodwin, Cliff (1999). When the Wind Changed: The Life and Death of Tony Hancock. Century (Penguin Random House). ISBN 978-0-7126-7615-1. (registration required)
- Fisher, John (22 December 2008). Tony Hancock: The Definitive Biography. HarperCollins UK. ISBN 978-0-00-728778-9.

== Biographical filmed documentaries ==
- Omnibus: Hancock (1985): a BBC documentary which seriously looked at Hancock's life and work, and his legacy. With contributions by Beryl Vertue, Galton & Simpson, Bill Kerr and producers Dennis Main Wilson and Duncan Wood.

== Biographical filmed dramas ==
- Hancock (1991): a Screen One production, broadcast on BBC One and starring Alfred Molina
- Kenneth Williams: Fantabulosa! (2006): a BBC Four drama about Kenneth Williams, featuring Martin Trenaman as Hancock
- Hancock and Joan (2008): a BBC Four drama, starring Ken Stott.

based on the affair between the comedian Tony Hancock and Joan Le Mesurier
