= Galton and Simpson =

English comedy scriptwriters

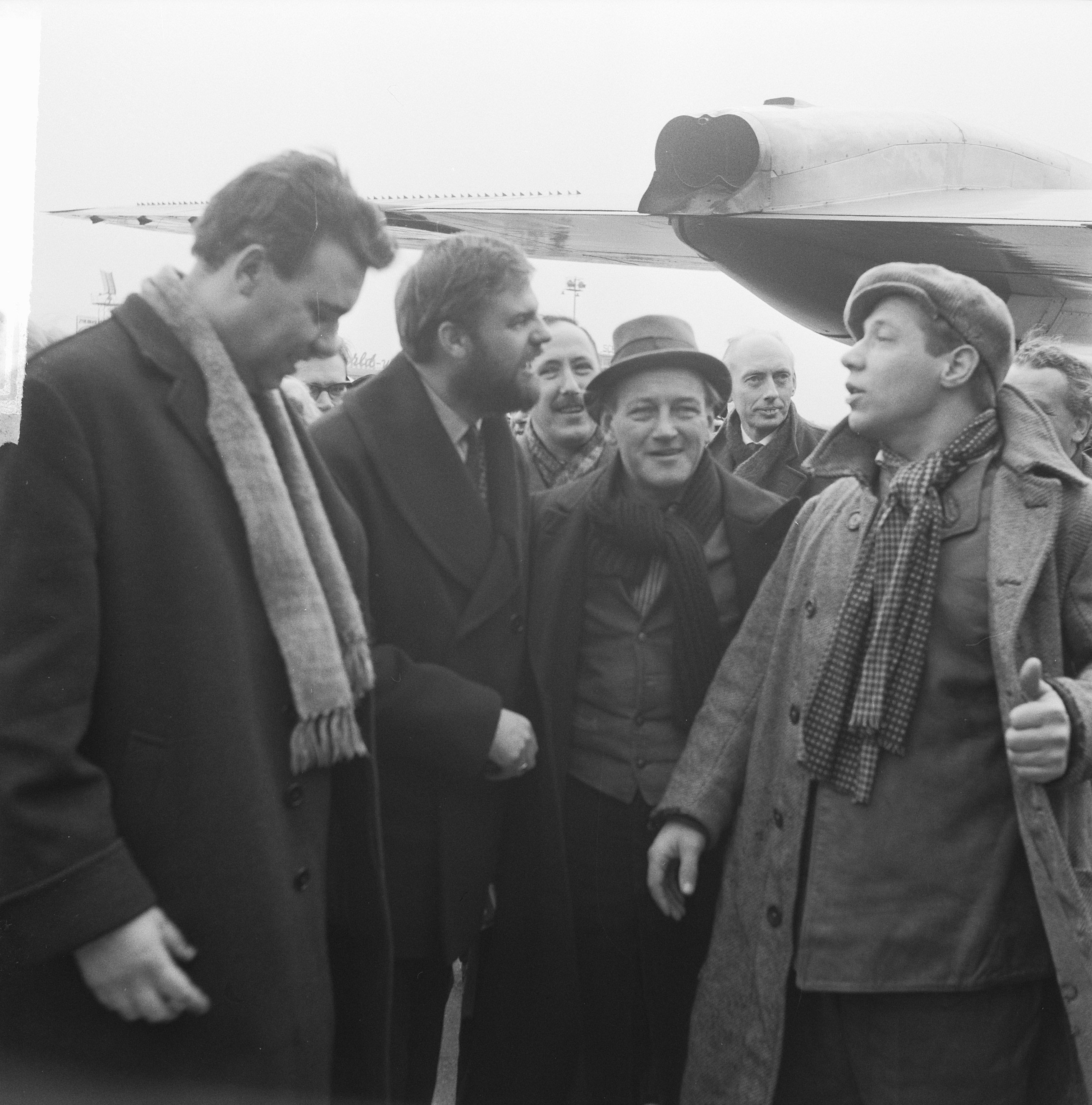
- L-R - Alan Simpson, Ray Galton, with the stars of Stiefbeen en zoon, the Dutch version of Steptoe and Son, Rien van Nunen and Piet Römer

Comedy career
- Years active: 1948–2017
- Genres: Radio, television, film
- Former members: Ray Galton; Alan Simpson

Galton and Simpson were a British comedy scriptwriting duo, who wrote for radio, television and film, consisting of Ray Galton OBE (17 July 1930 – 5 October 2018) and Alan Simpson OBE (27 November 1929 – 8 February 2017). They had an association that lasted 60 years, and are best known for their work with comedian Tony Hancock on radio and television between 1954 and 1961 and their long-running television situation comedy, Steptoe and Son, eight series of which were aired between 1962 and 1974.

== Career ==
Most writers meet as writers but neither Ray nor I had written before we met so we only ever knew how to do it together. I did the typing and we didn't put anything down until we'd agreed the line, rewriting as we went without doing drafts. For a while we shared an office with Eric Sykes and Spike Milligan. Eric used to write by hand in enormous letters, with three sentences to a page. Spike didn't have the patience to think of the right line so just wrote non-stop. When he couldn't think of a line he'd just write "Fuck it" and keep going. Then he'd go back and do draft after draft until he'd taken out all the "Fuck its".

Galton and Simpson met in 1948, while being treated for tuberculosis at the Milford Hospital near Godalming in Surrey. The partnership's break in comedy writing came with the Derek Roy vehicle Happy Go Lucky. They had been writing gags for Roy at five shillings a time but when the main writers were sacked the pair took over writing the scripts. Tony Hancock was in the show but featured in a sketch written by two Australian writers. They met at a rehearsal and Hancock subsequently asked the pair to write a piece for another radio show he was booked to appear on. They continued to work with Hancock and from 1954 to 1959 they wrote Hancock's Half Hour on radio; a series that also ran on television between 1956 and 1961. In October that year Hancock ended his professional relationship with the writers, and with Beryl Vertue who worked with the writers' at their agency Associated London Scripts. This writers' co-operative had been founded by Eric Sykes and Spike Milligan, with others involved, including Hancock for a time.

After their association with Hancock had ended, they wrote a series of Comedy Playhouse (1961–62), ten one-off half-hour plays for the BBC. One play in the series, The Offer, was well received, and from this emerged Steptoe and Son (1962–74), about two rag and bone men, father and son, who live together in a squalid house in West London. This was the basis for the American series Sanford and Son, the Dutch series Stiefbeen en Zoon and the Swedish series Albert & Herbert.

Their comedy is characterised by a bleak and somewhat fatalistic tone. Steptoe and Son in particular is, at times, extremely black comedy, and close in tone to social realist drama. Both the character played by Tony Hancock in Hancock's Half Hour and Harold Steptoe (Harry H. Corbett) are pretentious, would-be intellectuals who find themselves trapped by the squalor of their lives. This theme had been expanded upon in their script for Tony Hancock's film The Rebel (1961), about a civil servant who moves to Paris to become an artist. Gabriel Chevallier's novel Clochemerle (1934) was adapted by Galton and Simpson as a BBC/West German co-production in 1972. They contributed the book to Jacob's Journey, a musical accompaniment to a 1973 production of Joseph and the Amazing Technicolor Dreamcoat, which was however soon dropped. Around this time an unbroadcast television pilot entitled Bunclarke With an E was recorded based on a Hancock's Half Hour script, with Arthur Lowe and James Beck, but Beck died before the project could be developed as a series. Another series from this period, Casanova '73 (1973) with Leslie Phillips in the lead, was described by The Times in its obituary of Galton as "disappointingly typical of their later work."

While both writers continued to work after Steptoe and Son ended, including several projects with Frankie Howerd, they had no further high-profile successes. Duncan Wood, the former Hancock and Steptoe producer by then at Yorkshire Television, commissioned The Galton & Simpson Playhouse, a seven-part series broadcast in 1977, featuring leading actors of the time such as Richard Briers, Leonard Rossiter and Arthur Lowe. None of these shows led to another series. Simpson retired from scriptwriting in 1978, becoming an after-dinner speaker, while Galton collaborated in several projects with Johnny Speight.

In the 80s, they also contributed with scripts to European Disney comics.

In 1996 and 1997, comedian Paul Merton revived several Hancock's Half Hour and other Galton and Simpson scripts for ITV to a mixed reception. Ray Galton's Get Well Soon, based on his and Simpson's early sanatorium experiences, was broadcast by the BBC in 1997.

In October 2005, Galton and John Antrobus premiered their play Steptoe and Son in Murder at Oil Drum Lane at the Theatre Royal, York. The play is set in the present day and relates the events that lead to Harold killing his father, and their eventual meeting thirty years later (Albert appearing as a ghost). A series of old plays updated for modern times, entitled Galton and Simpson's Half Hour, was broadcast on BBC Radio 2 in 2009. The series of four episodes was made to celebrate the duo's 60-year anniversary, and the cast consists of Frank Skinner, Mitchell and Webb, Rik Mayall, June Whitfield and Paul Merton. The successful Scandinavian television series Fleksnes Fataliteter and Albert & Herbert were based on Hancock's Half Hour and Steptoe and Son.

== Awards ==
Galton and Simpson were both awarded OBEs in the 2000 New Year Honours for their contribution to British television.

On 1 June 2013, the British Comedy Society unveiled a blue plaque to Galton and Simpson at Milford Hospital (formerly the sanatorium at which the pair first met).

On 8 May 2016, the two men were awarded the BAFTA Fellowship for their comedy writing.
