= Babs (2017 film) =

British TV drama

- Written by: Tony Jordan
- Directed by: Dominic Leclerc
- Country of origin: United Kingdom
- Original language: English

Production
- Running time: 90 minutes

Original release
- Network: BBC One
- Release: 7 May 2017

Babs is a BBC biopic about the life of British actress Dame Barbara Windsor. Details of the film were announced by Charlotte Moore, the BBC's Acting Director of Television, on 26 May 2016, a week after Windsor made her final appearance in EastEnders as the long-running character Peggy Mitchell. The film, written by EastEnders scriptwriter Tony Jordan, shows Windsor in the 1990s as she prepares to go on stage and recalls events from her life, including her childhood and marriage to gangster Ronnie Knight, as well as her rise to fame as part of the Carry On cast.

It was broadcast on 7 May 2017, to coincide with Windsor's 80th birthday. Upon the announcement of the project, Windsor spoke of her delight that Jordan had been chosen to write the screenplay: "Tony knows the real me and what makes me tick and I was particularly taken by the way he wants to tell my tale which is not in the way people will expect it to be. [...] I am honoured and excited that Tony and the BBC have commissioned this." Windsor's cameo appearance was her last performance as an actress.

== Synopsis ==
Focussing mainly on the strained and estranged relationship with her father, Windsor recalls in talks in surreal encounters with the ghost of her father who accompanies her through flashbacks of her 50 years of ups and downs of her career as an actress and singer. The film opens in 1993 on the stage of an empty theatre where she is due to appear in an evening performance. The first scenes cover her childhood beginning with being evacuated during World War II and her first auditions as a talented, Cockney pre-teen. From her first appearance on stage at age 13 and her studies under Joan Littlewood at the Theatre Royal, to her troubled marriage to Ronnie Knight, and the private ordeals of her complex romantic life and later romantic exploits, culminating with her marriage to Scott Mitchell, the film ends back in 1993 with a cameo of the real Barbara Windsor singing the jazz standard "On the Sunny Side of the Street" in the theatre.

== Cast ==
- Jaime Winstone as Barbara
- Barbara Windsor as Herself
- Honor Kneafsey as Barbara Ann Deeks
- Samantha Spiro as Babs (Spiro reprises her role from the stage play Cleo, Camping, Emmanuelle and Dick and the ITV film adaptation Cor, Blimey! from 2000.)
- Nick Moran as John Deeks
- Leanne Best as Rose Deeks
- Luke Allen-Gale as Ronnie Knight
- Zoë Wanamaker as Joan Littlewood
- Robert East as Divorce Judge
- Alex Macqueen as Peter Charlesworth
- James Atherton as Cliff (Saxophonist)
- Jerry-Jane Pears as Jayne Mansfield
- Nicholas Asbury as Gerald Thomas
- Robin Sebastian as Kenneth Williams
- Julia Ford as Julie Deeks

== Reception ==
Reviewing the programme in The Guardian, Fiona Sturges said, "I so wanted to love Babs (7 May, 8pm, BBC1), the BBC's biopic of Barbara Windsor, the British national treasure best known for her rocket-propelled bikini in Carry On Camping and steady stream of bitch slaps as Peggy, the brassy matriarch in EastEnders. In the end, though, I was just baffled." Sturges praised the performances by Jaime Winstone and Samantha Spiro, but added that "the plot makes fractionally less sense than the episode of EastEnders where Peggy shoved Dirty Den's second wife into his open grave so she could apologise to his corpse for murdering him. OK, so it was the second time Den had died, but at least we weren't seeing dear old Babs in triplicate."

Writing in the same newspaper, Chitra Ramaswamy described Babs as "a heartwarming and only occasionally cliche-ridden biopic". Ramaswamy said of the plot that "it's such a standard showbiz arc you feel you’ve seen it all before", whilst also praising the performance by Winstone.

The Telegraph awarded Babs four stars out of five, with Gerard O'Donovan writing "Babs was undoubtedly rose-tinted in parts, but it was also heart-warming and a joyfully camp tribute to a national treasure." However, Andrew Billen in The Times gave it two stars out of five.

== Release ==
Babs was released on DVD by IMC Vision on 15 May 2017.

== See also ==
- Cor, Blimey! – 2000 ITV television drama about Sid James and Barbara Windsor
- Hattie – 2011 BBC television drama about Hattie Jacques
- Kenneth Williams: Fantabulosa! – 2004 BBC television drama about Kenneth Williams
