= Samantha Spiro =

British actress (born 1968)

- Born: 20 June 1968 (age 58); Mill Hill, London, England, UK
- Education: Webber Douglas Academy of Dramatic Art (BA)
- Occupations: Actress; singer
- Years active: 1994–present
- Spouse: Mark Leadbetter (m. 2002)
- Children: 2

Samantha Spiro (born 20 June 1968) is an English actress and singer. She played Barbara Windsor in the stage play Cleo, Camping, Emmanuelle and Dick and the television films Cor, Blimey! and Babs, D.I. Vivien Friend in M.I.T.: Murder Investigation Team, Melessa Tarly in the HBO series Game of Thrones, and Maureen Groff in Sex Education. She has won two Laurence Olivier Awards.

== Background ==
Born in Mill Hill, London, England, Spiro grew up in Radlett, Hertfordshire. She is Jewish. Spiro decided to be an actress at the age of ten after seeing a production of Androcles and the Lion at the Open Air Theatre, Regent's Park. She joined the National Youth Theatre and later trained at the Webber Douglas Academy of Dramatic Art.

Spiro attended Bancroft's School from 1982 to 1985 and subsequently returned in 2016 for an Arts & Drama masterclass Spiro spoke about how her time at Bancroft's had fuelled her enthusiasm for a career in the Arts.

Spiro married actor Mark Leadbetter, whom she met at drama school, in February 2002. They have two daughters, one named Harriet. They live in Queen's Park, London.

== Career ==
=== Theatre ===
Spiro's first acting job after graduating from drama school was with the Open Air Theatre, Regent's Park, in productions of A Midsummer Night's Dream, The Boys From Syracuse and Macbeth. Her many theatre credits include As You Like It, Teechers, The Tragic Roundabout, Jumpers, On the Piste, Roots, How the Other Half Loves and Glyn and It, opposite Penelope Keith.

Spiro played Barbara Windsor in Cleo, Camping, Emmanuelle and Dick at the National Theatre, a production she credits as her first big break, which "open[ed] a lot of doors". She has also appeared in the Minerva Theatre production of Funny Girl and the first West End revival of Alan Ayckbourn's Bedroom Farce.

Spiro played Rachel in Mike Leigh's production of Two Thousand Years at the National Theatre. This was the first Jewish role of her career. She said:

For English/Jewish artists in this business, we're English first and the Jewish thing comes down the line. Whereas in the United States, Jewishness is a much celebrated thing. Jewishness is a part of their very being.

Here, I think, we repress it and, far from celebrating it, almost shy away from it. After Two Thousand Years, I suddenly felt that there is a place for people like me. Until that point I hadn't had a career playing Jewish people. I had got that stuff out of the way by the time I came to play Fanny Brice [in Funny Girl] who is very much a Jewish character.

In 2009 Spiro played Maria in the Donmar Warehouse production of Twelfth Night at the Wyndham's Theatre, alongside Derek Jacobi, and Beatrice in Much Ado About Nothing at the Open Air Theatre. Most recently, she appeared in the acclaimed Open Air Theatre production of Hello, Dolly!, playing Dolly Levi.

In 2013 Spiro played Lady Macbeth in Macbeth at Shakespeare's Globe, alongside Billy Boyd and Joseph Millson.

Discussing whether she prefers acting in the theatre to television or film, Spiro said: "I think theatre prefers me. These days you have to do both, but it never feels as if the TV casting people are beating down my door to offer me work. I just feel that in this business you are lucky if you’re doing something you enjoy."

=== Television, film and radio ===
Spiro reprised the role of Barbara Windsor in the television adaptation of Cleo, Camping, Emmanuelle and Dick, Cor, Blimey!, starring opposite Geoffrey Hutchings.

Her other television credits include The Bill, Cold Feet, Plebs, Coupling, After You've Gone and M.I.T.: Murder Investigation Team, in which she played the lead role of DI Vivien Friend. She described the role of Friend as "quite an unusual departure for me...I've done quite a bit of comedy and I've played characters who are light-hearted and characters who are tarts with hearts. In M.I.T. there is no tart or heart!" In order to research the part, Spiro spent time with a female Detective Inspector with the real-life Murder Investigation Team. From 9 August 2010, Spiro starred in the BBC comedy Grandma's House. She plays the part of Simon Amstell's aunt Liz. In 2012 she also appeared in the SkyArts comedy series Psychobitches, where she played various female icons including Audrey Hepburn, Elizabeth Taylor, Marilyn Monroe and Mary Whitehouse.

In September 2013, Spiro joined the cast of the BBC Three sitcom Bad Education as Professor Celia Green, the new deputy headmaster and adversary to Jack Whitehall's character.

In 2013 Spiro starred in an episode of the Sky Atlantic series Little Crackers, an autobiographical comedy written by Rebecca Front in which Spiro played Front's mother.

In 2016 she joined the HBO series Game of Thrones in season 6 as Melessa Tarly, the mother of Samwell Tarly. That year she also joined Tracey Ullman's Show in the recurring role of Birgit, the fictitious fridge-magnet-loving personal assistant and confidante to Tracey Ullman's impression of German Chancellor Angela Merkel. She reprised her role in Ullman's Tracey Breaks the News. In 2017 Spiro reprised her role of Barbara Windsor in the BBC One drama Babs, a biopic based on the life of Windsor. She also appeared in the Doctor Who episode "The Doctor Falls", as Hazran.

Spiro has appeared in the films Beyond Bedlam (1994), as WPC Foster, and Tomorrow La Scala! (2002), as Janey. She also played Martha Tabram in From Hell (2001), opposite Johnny Depp.

Her radio drama credits include The Casebook of Inspector Steine, Gospel According to Mary, Little Cinderellas, Beside the Seaside, Show Boat in which she played Magnolia Hawks, Sarah Kahn in Chicken Soup with Barley and the Guy Meredith play Spring Forward, Fall Back for BBC Radio 7.

In 2018 Spiro played the role of Mrs Erlynne in Kathy Burke's production of Oscar Wilde's Lady Windermere's Fan at London's Vaudeville Theatre. This production was recorded and shown in cinemas under the "More2Screen" initiative.

From 2019 to 2023, Spiro portrayed the recurring character Maureen Groff in Laurie Nunn's British comedy-drama series Sex Education.

== Awards ==
In 2001, Spiro was awarded the Olivier Award for Best Actress in a Musical for her performance in the 2000 season Donmar Warehouse production of Merrily We Roll Along. She won a Whatsonstage.com award for Best Actress in a Musical for the same production. In 2010, Spiro was once again awarded the Olivier Award for Best Actress in a Musical for her performance in Hello, Dolly! at the Open Air Theatre, Regent's Park.

Spiro won a 2004 Joseph Jefferson Award for Actress in a Supporting Role in a Musical, for the production of A Little Night Music at the Chicago Shakespeare Theater in Chicago, Illinois.

In the 2011 British Comedy Awards she won the Best Female Comedy Breakthrough Artist award for her performance in Grandma's House.

== Filmography ==
=== Film ===
Year	Title	Role	Notes
1994	Beyond Bedlam	WPC Foster	
1998	Guru in Seven	Sharon	
2001	From Hell	Martha Tabram	
2002	Tomorrow La Scala!	Janey	
2012	A Running Jump	Debbie	Short film
2016	Me Before You	Josie Clark	
2017	Carnage	Edith Paper	
2017	Catherine the Great: Husbands, Lovers and Sons	Catherine II	
2019	Horrible Histories: The Movie – Rotten Romans	Mrs. Felix	
2021	Where Is Anne Frank	Edith Frank	
2023	Hoard	Michelle	
2023	One Life	Esther Rantzen	
2024	Hard Truths	Nicole	
2025	Scope	Fiona	Short film
2027	Narnia: The Magician's Nephew	TBA	Post-production

=== Television ===
Year	Title	Role	Notes
1994	The Bill	Cherie	Episode: "Dealer Wins"
1994	The Knock	Young Woman	Episode: #1.1
2000	Cor, Blimey!	Barbara Windsor	TV film
2001	Cold Feet	Ruth Wylie	3 episodes
2001	TV Go Home	Sarah Galoshes	Unknown episodes
2002	Sir Gawain and the Green Knight	Red Lady	Voice; TV film
2003	M.I.T.: Murder Investigation Team	D.I. Vivien Friend	8 episodes
2004	Coupling	Jeffina	Episode: "9½ Months"
2007	After You've Gone	Ann Venables	2 episodes
2010–2012	Grandma's House	Auntie Liz	12 episodes
2011	Rock & Chips	Beryl Bird	Episode: "The Frog and the Pussycat"
2012	Playhouse Presents	Mary Whitehouse	Episode: "Psychobitches"
2012	Little Crackers	Sheila Front	Episode: "Rainy Days and Mondays"
2012	Panto!	Di Jenkins	TV film
2012–2014	Psychobitches	Various	11 episodes
2013	Bad Education	Professor Celia Green	3 episodes
2014	The Wrong Mans	Maria	Episode: "X-Mans"
2015	London Spy	Detective Taylor	4 episodes
2016	Game of Thrones	Melessa Tarly	Episode: "Blood of My Blood"
2016–2018	Tracey Ullman's Show	Various	13 episodes
2016, 2019	Plebs	Sylvia	2 episodes
2017	Babs	Barbara Windsor	TV film
2017	Doctor Who	Hazran	Episode: "The Doctor Falls"
2017	Doc Martin	Tina Collins	Episode: "Accidental Hero"
2017–2018	Tracey Breaks the News	Various	6 episodes
2018	Grandpa's Great Escape	Patricia Bunting	TV film
2018	Oi Leonardo	Various	3 episodes
2018	Agatha and the Truth of Murder	Pamela	TV film
2019	Island of Dreams	J. K. Rowling	TV film
2019–2020	Semi-Detached	Kate	6 episodes
2019–2023	Sex Education	Maureen Groff	23 episodes
2020	Call the Midwife	Grace Calthorpe	Episode #9.5
2021	Midsomer Murders	Phyllis Cuttle	Episode: "For Death Prepare"
2021	Ridley Road	Liza Epstein	4 episodes
2021	The Larkins	Bertha	Episode: "In Which Ma's Sister Bertha Comes to Visit"
2021	Ragdoll	Joy	3 episodes
2022	Dodger	Marie Tussaud	Episode: "Waxworks"
2022	Not Going Out	Bigoted Woman	Episode: "Jury"
2022	The Pentaverate	Darleen Windelchuck	2 episodes
2023	Vera	Belinda Rayford	Episode: "Against the Tide"
2023	Beyond Paradise	Yvonne Wiley	Episode #1.1
2023	Inside No. 9	Sue	Episode: "Paraskevidekatriaphobia"
2023	Still Up	Christine	Episode: "Veggie Veggie Bing Bong"
2026	Bill’s Included	Siobhan	6 Episodes

=== Theatre ===
- The Merry Wives of Windsor Royal Shakespeare Theatre, Stratford-upon-Avon (2024)
- Lady Windermere's Fan Vaudeville Theatre, West End (2018)
- The House They Grew Up In Chichester Minerva (2017)
- Guys and Dolls Phoenix Theatre
- The Taming of the Shrew d: Toby Frow, Shakespeare's Globe
- Filumena d: Michael Attenborough, Almeida Theatre
- Company d: Jonathan Munby, Sheffield Crucible
- Chicken Soup with Barley d: Dominic Cooke, Royal Court Theatre
- Hello, Dolly! (Dolly) d:Tim Sheader, Regents Park
  - Best Actress in a Musical – 2010 Olivier Awards
- Much Ado About Nothing (Beatrice) d: Tim Sheader, Regents Park
- Twelfth Night (Maria) d: Michael Grandage, Donmar / Wyndhams
- Funny Girl (Fanny Brice) d: Angus Jackson, Chichester Festival
- The Family Plays (Mother) d: Joe Hill-Gibbons, Royal Court Theatre
- Two Thousand Years d: Mike Leigh, Royal National Theatre
- A Little Night Music (Charlotte) d: Gary Griffin Chicago Shakespeare's Theatre
  - Winner: Best Supporting Actress in a Musical, Joseph Jefferson Awards 2004
- A Midsummer Night's Dream (Titania/Hippolyta) d: Michael Grandage Crucible, Sheffield
- Bedroom Farce (Jan) d: Loveday Ingram Michael Codron Plays
- Merrily We Roll Along (Mary Flynn) d: Michael Grandage Donmar Warehouse
  - Olivier Awards 2001 & Whatsonstage.com Awards 2001 – Best Actress in a Musical
- As You Like It (Celia) d: Michael Grandage Crucible & Lyric
- Jumpers (Dorothy Moore) d: Bill Alexander Birmingham Rep
- Cleo Camping... (Barbara Windsor) d: Terry Johnson Royal National Theatre
- Roots (Beatie Bryant) d: John Retallack Watford Palace/Oxford
- As You Like It (Phoebe) d: Polly Irvin W. Yorkshire/Bristol
- Teechers (Gail Saunders) d: Graham Watts Hull Truck & No 1 Tour
- On The Piste (Bev Ryan) d: Graham Watts Hull Truck
- How the Other Half Loves (Mary) d: Penelope Keith Theatre Royal, Windsor
- Glyn & 'It' (Clara Bow) d: Richard Cottrell Yvonne Arnaud & tour
- A Midsummer Night's Dream (Hermia) d: Delena Kidd London & Middle East
- Tons of Money (Simpson) d: David Conville Mercury Th, Colchester
- A Midsummer Night's Dream (First Fairy) d: Ian Talbot Regents Park Open Air
- As You Like It (Audrey) d: Maria Aitkin Regents Park Open Air
- Lady, Be Good (Daisy) d: Ian Talbot Regents Park Open Air
- Macbeth (Witch) d: Bill Baunt Regents Park Open Air
- The Boys from Syracuse (Courtesan) d: Judi Dench Regents Park Open Air
