= Sid James =

South African-British actor (1913–1976)

Sidney James
- James in 1974
- Born: Solomon Joel Cohen; 8 May 1913; Johannesburg, South Africa
- Died: 26 April 1976 (aged 62); Sunderland, England
- Resting place: Golders Green Crematorium, London, England
- Occupations: Actor, comedian
- Years active: 1947–1976
- Spouses: Berthe Delmont (m. 1936; div. 1940) Meg Williams (m. 1943; div. 1952) Valerie Ashton (m. 1952)
- Children: 7, including Reina James

Sidney James (born Solomon Joel Cohen; 8 May 1913 – 26 April 1976) was a South African–British actor and comedian whose career encompassed radio, television, stage and screen. Noted for his distinctive laugh, he was best known for numerous roles in the Carry On film series.

Born to a middle-class Jewish family in South Africa, James started his career in his native country before finding his greatest success in the UK. Beginning his screen career playing bit parts in films from 1947, he was cast in numerous small and supporting roles into the 1950s. He appeared in the film The Lavender Hill Mob in 1951, starring Alec Guinness.

His profile was raised as Tony Hancock's co-star in Hancock's Half Hour, firstly in the radio series and later when it was adapted for television and ran from 1954 to 1960. After this he became known as a regular performer in the Carry On films, appearing in 19 films of the series, top-billed in all but two.

His leading roles in television sitcoms continued. He starred in the 1970s sitcom Bless This House until his death in 1976.

== Early life ==
James, born Solomon Joel Cohen on 8 May 1913 in Johannesburg, South Africa, was the second son of London-born Jewish vaudeville performers Reina (née Solomon; 1892–1965) and Lazarus Joel "Laurie" Cohen (1884–1948). His elder brother, Maurice, was born in 1911. Known affectionately as "Sollie" in childhood, he later changed his name to Sidney James following confusion with a similarly named cousin at his school, taking his new surname from his parents' stage names.

The family lived at the home of his maternal grandmother, Flora Solomon, on Hancock Street in Hillbrow, Johannesburg. In 1919, the Cohens left their sons in the care of Laurie's brother and sister-in-law, Abraham and Esther Cohen, in Newcastle, Natal after being offered a tour of Australia with their vaudeville act. By the time the tour ended in 1921 they were beginning divorce proceedings. Laurie remained in Australia with relatives, while Reina moved to her mother's new home in Joubert Park with their sons.

James claimed various previous occupations, including diamond cutter, dance tutor and boxer, (Note: These were also reported in a BBC Radio 4 tribute (to be broadcast in celebration of the centenary of his birth) as short-term jobs before he 'settled down' as a trainee in his mother's hairdressing salon.) but his main employment had been as a hairdresser at the salon owned by his mother and her siblings, where he had trained. It was at a hairdressing salon in Kroonstad, Orange Free State, that he met his first wife. His father-in-law, Johannesburg businessman Joseph Delmont, bought James a hairdressing salon in the basement of the prestigious Carlton Hotel, but within a year James announced that he wanted to become an actor and joined the Johannesburg Repertory Players. Through this group he gained work with the South African Broadcasting Corporation.

During World War II he served as a lieutenant in the Union Defence Force Entertainment Unit in South Africa's army, and subsequently took up acting as a career. He moved to the United Kingdom in December 1946, financed by his service gratuity. Initially he worked in repertory, before being spotted for the nascent British post-war film industry.

== Career ==
=== From 1947 to 1960 ===
James made his first credited film appearances in Night Beat and Black Memory in 1947, both crime dramas. He played the alcoholic hero's barman in Powell and Pressburger's The Small Back Room in 1949. The Lavender Hill Mob in 1951 was his first comedy film, ranked 17th out of the 100 best British films by the British Film Institute: with Alfie Bass, he made up the bullion robbery gang headed by Alec Guinness and Stanley Holloway. He also appeared in Lady Godiva Rides Again and The Galloping Major, both films were released in 1951, and as Harry Hawkins in The Titfield Thunderbolt (1953), and also had a lead role in The Wedding of Lilli Marlene. He featured in another Alec Guinness film, Father Brown (US: The Detective, 1954) and in Trapeze (1956) as Harry the snake charmer, a circus film which was one of the most successful films of its year, and he played Master Henry in "Outlaw Money" (also 1956), an episode of The Adventures of Robin Hood. He also appeared in a 1956 episode of the TV series The Buccaneers 'The Hand of the Hawk', starring Robert Shaw.

James had a supporting part as a TV advertisement producer in Charlie Chaplin's A King in New York, a non-comic supporting role as a journalist in the science-fiction film Quatermass 2, and he performed in Hell Drivers (all 1957), a film with Stanley Baker. This was one of many appearances James made for the Rank Organisation.

The next year, James starred with Miriam Karlin in East End, West End by Wolf Mankowitz, a half-hour comedy series for the ITV company Associated Rediffusion. Set within the Jewish community of London's East End, the series of six episodes was transmitted in February and March 1958, but plans for further episodes were abandoned after a disappointing response. For a while though, it had looked as if his commitment elsewhere might end his work with Tony Hancock, one of the most popular television comedians of the time.

He had begun working with Tony Hancock in 1954, in his BBC Radio series Hancock's Half Hour. Having seen him in The Lavender Hill Mob, it was the idea of Hancock's writers, Galton and Simpson, to cast James. He played a character called Sid James (but having the invented middle name Balmoral) who was a petty criminal and would usually manage to con Hancock in some way, although the character eventually ceased to be Hancock's adversary. With the exception of James, the other regular cast members of the radio series were dropped when the series made the transition to television. His part in the show now greatly increased, and many viewers came to think of Hancock and James as a double act.

Tony Hancock (right) with James in Hancock's Half Hour

Feeling the format had become exhausted, Hancock decided to end his professional relationship with James at the end of the sixth television series in 1960. Although the two men remained friends, James was upset at his colleague's decision. The experience led to a shift away from the kind of roles for which he had become best known. He remained the lovable rogue but was keen to steer clear of criminal characters; in 1960 he turned down the part of Fagin in the original West End staging of Oliver! for that very reason.

=== Carry On films ===
James became a leading member of the Carry On films team, originally to replace Ted Ray, who had appeared in Carry On Teacher (1959). It had been intended that Ray would become a recurring presence in the Carry On series, but he was dropped after just one film because of contractual problems. James ultimately made 19 Carry On films, receiving top billing in 17, making him one of the most featured performers of the regular cast.

The characters he portrayed in the films were usually very similar to the wise-cracking, sly, lecherous Cockney he was famed for playing on television, and in most cases they bore the name Sid or Sidney, for example, Sir Sidney Ruff-Diamond in Carry On Up the Khyber and Sid Boggle in Carry On Camping. His distinctive laugh was often used and became, along with a world-weary "Cor, blimey!", his catchphrase.

There were Carry On films in which James played characters who were not called Sid or Sidney: Carry On Constable (1960), in which he played Sergeant Frank Wilkins; Carry On Henry (1971), a parody of the TV series The Six Wives of Henry VIII; Carry On Abroad (1972), in which James's character was named Vic Flange; and Carry On Dick (1974), a parody version of the legend of the highwayman Dick Turpin. In Henry and Dick, James played the title roles, while in Carry On Cleo he played Mark Antony. In Carry On Cowboy (1965), he adopted an American accent for his part as "The Rumpo Kid". James had previously used American accents in the films Give Us This Day (1949), Orders Are Orders (1954), A Yank in Ermine (1955), Wicked as They Come (1956), Chaplin's A King in New York (1957), The Man Inside (1958), and Another Time, Another Place (1958).

Following James and Hancock's professional split, Galton and Simpson continued to write for them individually. The Sidney Balmoral James character resurfaced in Citizen James (1960–1962), by which point Sid James was now consistently taking the lead role in his television work. Taxi! (1963–64) was his next series. A comedy-drama rather than a sitcom, it was created by Ted Willis, but although it ran to two series, the programme was not particularly successful.

In 1964, he made his first of two appearances on The Eamonn Andrews Show. The first few moments of the opening credits of one of them can be heard and seen in the television show Undermind, Episode 6, "Intent to Destroy", broadcast on 12 June 1965. His name is heard announced, and the show is seen on a television camera seconds later.

=== Later career ===
In 1967, James was intending to play Sergeant Nocker in Follow That Camel, but was already committed to recording the TV series George and the Dragon (1966–1968) for ATV, then one of the ITV contractors. James was replaced in Follow That Camel by the American comic actor Phil Silvers. On 13 May 1967, two weeks after the filming began of what eventually became an entry in the Carry On series, James suffered a severe heart attack. In the same year in Carry On Doctor, James was shown mainly lying in a hospital bed, owing to his real-life health problems. After his heart attack, James gave up his heavy cigarette habit and instead smoked a pipe or an occasional cigar; he lost weight, ate only one main meal a day, and limited himself to two or three alcoholic drinks per evening.

In 1968, James, Val Doonican and Arthur Askey were filmed playing golf in the village of Cockington near Torquay (British Pathé archives, film reference 457.1), for their production Viva Torbay: Travelling to the British Seaside.

His success in TV situation comedy continued with the programmes Two in Clover (1969–70) and Bless This House (1971–1976); the latter led to a film version in 1972.

== Personal life ==
James married three times:

- He and his first wife, Berthe Sadie "Toots" Delmont (1918–1966), were married on 12 August 1936 in Johannesburg and had a daughter, Elizabeth, in 1937. They were divorced in 1940, mainly as a result of his many relationships with other women and his deteriorating relationship with his father-in-law. Following the divorce, Elizabeth James did not see her father again until 1954 when she travelled to London for two weeks; after that meeting, they did not see each other again and contact between them was minimal.
- In 1943 in Pretoria, he married divorced dancer Meg Williams (née Sergei; 1913–1977). Their daughter Reina was born in 1947 and named after James' mother. They separated amicably in 1950 and divorced on 17 August 1952.
- On 21 August 1952 at Caxton Hall, James married Valerie Elizabeth Patsy Assan (1928–2022), an actress who used Ashton as her stage name. They had a son, Stephen James (born 1954), who became a music producer, and a daughter, Susan Valerie (born 1957), who became a television producer; Valerie miscarried a third child in 1965. During the latter part of their marriage they lived in a house partly designed by James himself, Delaford Park, in Iver, Buckinghamshire, a location close enough to Pinewood Studios to allow him to return home for lunch while filming.

Goodwin claims that James fathered two illegitimate children during his marriage to Toots Delmont, to separate women, that were born in Rhodesia after his father-in-law paid them off. A third child, born to a stylist from James' salon and conceived before the divorce, was born in Cape Town in 1941. Goodwin also claims that James once struck Delmont when she revealed she was pregnant.

During his third marriage, James had an affair with Carry On co-star Barbara Windsor. The affair was dramatised in the 1998 stage play Cleo, Camping, Emmanuelle and Dick and its 2000 television adaptation Cor, Blimey!. James's obsession with Windsor was such that it was rumoured that her then-husband, gangster Ronnie Knight, had all of James's furniture rearranged at home as a subtle threat; on another occasion, Knight was rumoured to have embedded an axe in James's floor. Close friends of James at the time, including Vince Powell and William G. Stewart, dismissed these suggestions.

James was an inveterate and largely unsuccessful gambler, having been introduced to the activity by his uncle, Louis Cohen. James lost tens of thousands of pounds over his lifetime. His gambling addiction was such that he had an agreement with his agent, Michael Sullivan, under which his wife was not told how much he was being paid so that a portion could be set aside for gambling.

== Death ==
On 26 April 1976, four days after the end of the sixth series of Bless This House, James was on tour in a revival of a comedy, The Mating Season, when he suffered a heart attack on stage at the Sunderland Empire Theatre. Actresses Olga Lowe and Audrey Jeans thought that he was playing a practical joke at first when he failed to reply to their dialogue. When they ad-libbed to him and he still failed to respond, they moved towards the wings to seek help. The technical manager, Melvyn James (no relation), called for the curtain to close and requested a doctor, while the audience – who were unaware of what was happening – laughed, believing the events to be part of the show. An ambulance was called, and he was pronounced dead on arrival at Sunderland General Hospital. He was 62.

At the time of his death, negotiations were being held for a seventh and eighth series of Bless This House, as well as another film adaptation, to be produced along with an hour-long television variety special featuring James, but those plans were scrapped due to his death. Bruce Forsyth ultimately replaced him in the leading role of the 1976 TV version of The Mating Season that went out on ITV in December of the same year. James was cremated and his ashes were scattered at Golders Green Crematorium.

== Legacy ==
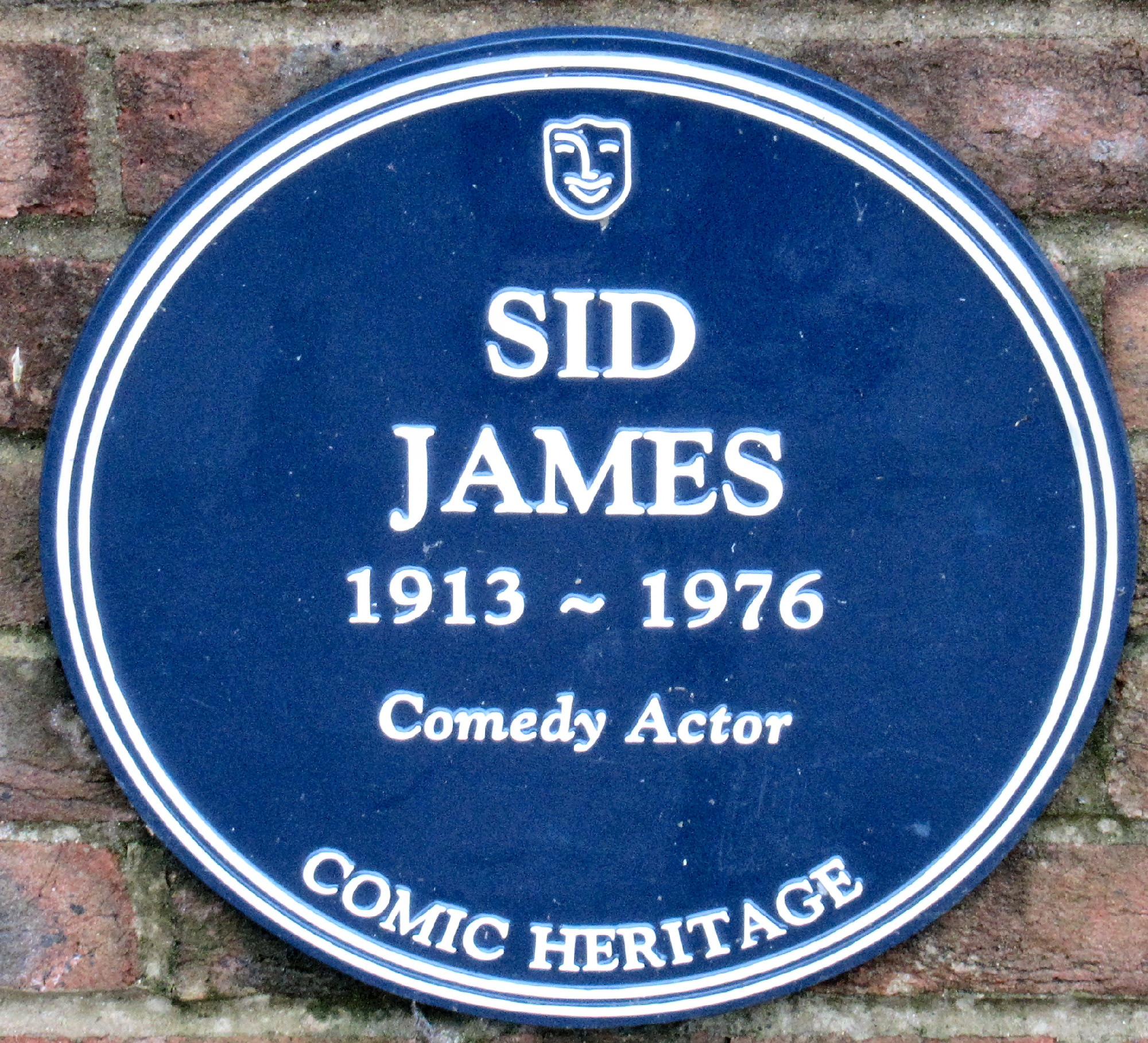
Comic Heritage plaque, Teddington, England

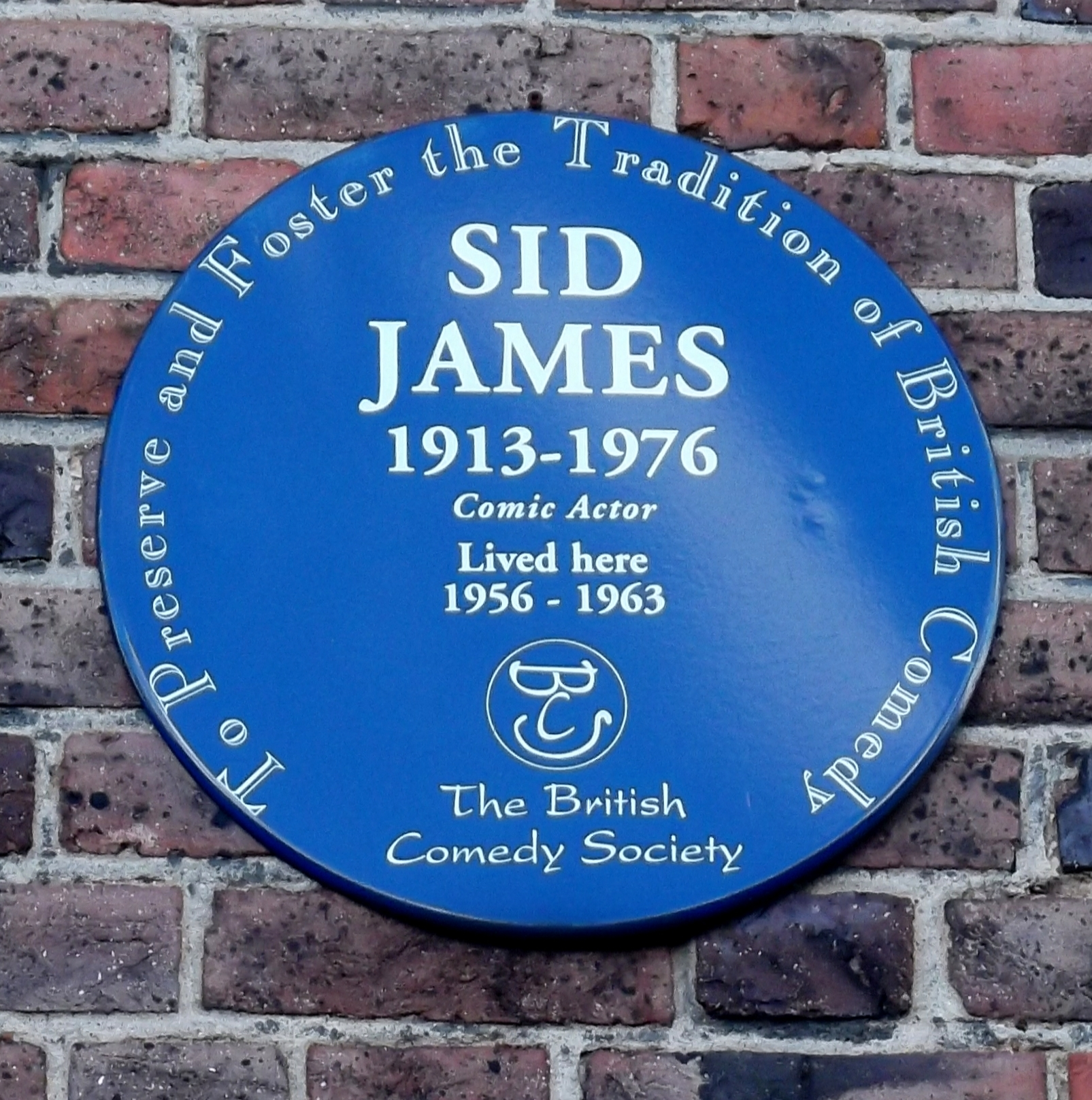
British Comedy Society plaque at 35 Gunnersbury Avenue

James has been the subject of at least five tribute shows: Channel 4's With Out Walls, Seriously Seeking Sid in the late 1980s; a 1996 one-off tribute, The Very Best of Sid James; a 2000 episode of the series The Unforgettable; a 2002 episode of Heroes of Comedy; and in 2013, the BBC's The Many Faces Of Sid James.

James was played by Geoffrey Hutchings in Terry Johnson's play Cleo, Camping, Emmanuelle and Dick, which premiered at the National Theatre in 1998. Hutchings reprised the role in the subsequent film adaptation, Cor, Blimey!.

In the 2006 BBC television film Kenneth Williams: Fantabulosa!, James was played by Ged McKenna.

In August 2018, it was announced that a radio interview which James had recorded for BBC Radio Solent on 22 March 1976 had been re-discovered during research for a forthcoming BBC radio documentary celebrating the Carry On film series. The recording had been kept by BBC presenter Jeff Link, who had carried out the original interview. In the interview, James discusses his attempts to keep fit by skipping, his preference for working in films, his genuine affection for the Carry On films, and other topics. The interview is notable for its relaxed, humorous style. The producer of the forthcoming BBC Carry On documentary, Richard Latto, contacted James's surviving daughters after confirming the recording's authenticity. Reina James commented: "To hear him talking just before he's about to die... there's something hugely moving about that." Sue James called the interview "lovely and sympathetic".

A Heritage Foundation commemorative blue plaque to James was installed at the former Teddington Studios on Broom Road, Teddington, Greater London where every episode of Bless This House was recorded, until 30 June 2015 – at which time it was stolen, just before the building was demolished to make way for housing. A further blue plaque, placed by the British Comedy Society, commemorates his time living at 35 Gunnersbury Avenue (A406), from 1956 to 1963. The first plaque here was also stolen; the second "was placed much higher up the wall." (Note: Comedian Arthur Haynes lived in a house on the opposite side of Gunnersbury Avenue between 1963 and 1966.)
