= Cleo, Camping, Emmanuelle and Dick =

1998 play written by Terry Johnson

- Promotional poster
- Original language: English
- Written by: Terry Johnson
- Subject: Based on the life of Carry On star Sid James.
- Genre: Comedy

Premiere
- Date: 21 September 1998
- Place: Lyttelton, Royal National Theatre, London

Cleo, Camping, Emmanuelle and Dick is a 1998 play written by the English dramatist Terry Johnson, who also directed the original production at the National Theatre.

The play is about the off-screen love affair between Carry On film stars, Barbara Windsor and Sid James.

The comedy also portrays the filming of the "Carry On" series as a less than glamorous affair, characterised by leaking caravans, inadequately paid actors and argumentative co-stars.

Most of the play's action takes place in rainy locations, with Barbara staying in Sid's trailer, while he and co-star Kenneth Williams carry on their feud, which began when they starred together in the TV series Hancock's Half Hour.

In 2000, Johnson adapted the play for television as Cor, Blimey!.

== Characters ==
- Sid James
- Barbara Windsor
- Kenneth Williams
- Imogen Hassall
- Sally (Sid's dresser)
- Eddie (A driver and bodyguard supposedly employed by Barbara's husband, Ronnie Knight)

== Original cast ==
The cast of the original National Theatre production were:

- Geoffrey Hutchings (Sid)
- Samantha Spiro (Barbara)
- Adam Godley (Kenneth)
- Gina Bellman (Imogen)
- Jacqueline Defferary (Sally)
- Kenneth MacDonald (Eddie)
