= Geoffrey Hutchings =

English actor

- Hutchings in character as Mel Harvey from the comedy TV series Benidorm
- Born: 8 June 1939; Dorchester, Dorset, England, UK
- Died: 1 July 2010 (aged 71); London, England, UK
- Occupation: Actor
- Years active: 1964–2010
- Spouse(s): June Watts (1969–2002); Andi Godfrey (?–2010; his death)
- Children: 3

Geoffrey Hutchings (8 June 1939 – 1 July 2010) was an English stage, film and television actor.

== Early life and career ==
Hutchings was born in Dorchester, Dorset, England. After attending Hardye's School, he studied French and Physical Education at the University of Birmingham before attending the Royal Academy of Dramatic Art and later joining the Royal Shakespeare Company in 1968.

== Career ==
=== Stage ===
With the RSC from 1968 until the 1980s Hutchings played many roles in Shakespeare, including Launce, Octavius Caesar and Pandar. He played Bosola in the 1971 RSC production of John Webster's The Duchess of Malfi. Hutchings made his name particularly in Shakespeare's comic roles, including Dromio of Syracuse, Bottom, Feste, Lavache, Autolycus and Doctor Caius. Hutchings' singing voice often featured in his comic roles, with his appearance in 1982 as Lady Dodo in the musical Poppy winning a Laurence Olivier Award for Best Comedy Performance.

In 1998, he played Carry On actor Sid James in the Royal National Theatre's production of Terry Johnson's stage play Cleo, Camping, Emmanuelle and Dick, a behind-the-scenes look at the love affair between Sid James and his co-star Barbara Windsor, which was subsequently made into an ITV drama, Cor, Blimey!, in 2000. In 2004, he played Nagg in Samuel Beckett's Endgame at the Albery Theatre alongside Michael Gambon, Lee Evans and Liz Smith. From October 2006 to April 2007, he played Herr Schultz in the West End production of Cabaret. His final stage role was in 2009 in the West End production of The Shawshank Redemption.

=== Film and TV ===
In 1980, Hutchings starred as a character called Trunky Porter in the TV series Juliet Bravo.

In 1987, Hutchings played Harry Stobbs in series 3, episode 4 of The Bill.

A first collaboration with David Leland for the film Made in Britain (directed by Alan Clarke and starring Tim Roth) in 1981 has led to his notable role as Hubert Mansell, the father of Emily Lloyd in Wish You Were Here in 1987.

His other film successes included White Hunter, Black Heart (with Clint Eastwood), Henry V (with Kenneth Branagh), Topsy-Turvy (with Jim Broadbent), Clockwise (with John Cleese), The Thief Lord (as Conte) and The Affair of the Necklace (with Hilary Swank).

On television, his most notable role has probably been in Our Friends in the North (1996), in which he played corrupt building contractor John Edwards, a character closely based on the real-life figure of John Poulson. He also had a semi-regular role as Bobby Hollamby in the ITV prison drama Bad Girls from 2000 to 2003. Earlier, he had played second fiddle to Michael Gambon in 12 episodes of Maigret in 1992–1993. He also narrated several audiobooks based on Georges Simenon's Maigret stories. In 2005, he played Lionel Morris in ITV's Heartbeat. In 2007, Hutchings made a guest appearance in ITV drama Wild at Heart.

In December 2006, he made an appearance in the Sky One television adaptation of Terry Pratchett's Hogfather. From 2008 to 2009, he appeared in the ITV comedy series Benidorm as Mel Harvey and had a small role in the second Terry Pratchett adaptation Terry Pratchett's The Colour of Magic.

In February 2009, he appeared in EastEnders as Roger Clarke, Jane and Christian's father, and in the BBC film Nativity!.

In 2010, he appeared in the BBC medical drama Casualty and the sitcom Grandma's House, both of which were screened after his death.

He was a regular, as Mel Harvey, in the popular TV show Benidorm as the owner of five sunbed shops in the Greater Manchester area, appearing in Series 2 (2008), Series 3 (2009) and a 2009 special. His sudden death, just before the shooting of the 2010 Christmas special, meant that the script had to be heavily rewritten, with his character's death said to have occurred off-screen on a business trip abroad.

== Death ==
Hutchings died from meningitis in hospital on the morning of 1 July 2010. He was cremated at Kensal Green Cemetery, West London.

== Filmography ==
=== Film ===
Year	Title	Role	Notes
1975	Rime of the Ancient Mariner	The pilot (voice)	
1982	Made in Britain	Superintendent	Television film
1986	Clockwise	Mr. Wisely	
1987	Wish You Were Here	Hubert Mansell	
1988	On the Black Hill	Solicitor	
1989	Henry V	Corporal Nym	
1990	White Hunter Black Heart	Squadron Leader Alec Laing	
1999	Topsy-Turvy	Armourer	
2001	Mike Bassett: England Manager	Geoffrey Lightfoot	
2001	The Affair of the Necklace	President D'Aligre	
2003	It's All About Love	Mr. Morrison	
2003	Cheeky	Sid the Barman	
2006	The Thief Lord	Conte	
2009	She, a Chinese	Geoffrey Hunt	
2009	Nativity!	Father Tom	
2010	You Will Meet a Tall Dark Stranger	Alan's Father	Final film role to date

=== Television ===
Year	Title	Role	Notes
1965	The Ambassadors	Jacques Montan	Television film
1965	The Scarlet and the Black	Student	Episode: "Entry Into Society"
1966	Mrs Thursday	M. Grandjean	Episode: "A Little of What You Fancy"
1974	Antony and Cleopatra	A Fig Seller	Television film
1975	A Little Bit of Wisdom	Bandaged Man	Episode: "#2.2"
1976	Clayhanger	Arthur Dayson	2 episodes
1976	The Squirrels	First Man	Episode: "The Snatch"
1977	Raffles	Bank Official	Episode: "The Chest of Silver"
1980	Strangers	Stanley Roberts	Episode: "Retribution"
1980	Juliet Bravo	Trunky Porter / Commander Nigel Scott	Episode: "The One Who Got Away"
1983	Widows	Willy Daily	Episode: "#1.2"
1984	All the World's a Stage	Reading from the 1572 Act of Parliament	Episode: "A Muse of Fire"
1984	Charlie	Dave Abbott	2 episodes
1986	Hot Metal	Max Rutherford	5 episodes
1986	Lytton's Diary	Florist	Episode: "The Ends and the Means"
1986	Onassis: The Richest Man in the World	Meneghini	Television film
1987–2004	The Bill	Arthur Penrose / Martin Jackson / Harry Stobbs	3 episodes
1989	Bergerac	Sylvester Silver	Episode: "Weekend Off"
1989	Saracen	James Silverdale	Episode: "Infidels"
1989	Home James!	Sir Linus Brinks / Wainwright	2 episodes
1990	Brass	George Fairchild	6 episodes
1990	The Gravy Train	Gustave	4 episodes
1990	Traitors	Fr. Henry Garnet	Television film
1991	Pirate Prince	Rochefort	Television film
1991–1993	Screen One	Barton / Carwyn Phillips	2 episodes
1992	Perfect Scoundrels	Alan Fry	Episode: "The Long Way Home"
1992–1993	Maigret	Sgt. Lucas	12 episodes
1993	Minder	Heart Attack	Episode: "Last Orders at the Winchester"
1993	A Year in Provenence	Ralph Tompkins	Episode: "Room Service"
1993	Heart of Darkness	Delcommune	Television film
1993	Cracker	Pathologist	Episode: "One Day a Lemming Will Fly: Part 1"
1994	Drop the Dead Donkey	Alfred	Episode: "Helen's Parents"
1994–2010	Casualty	Alan Carson / Mr. Ross / Oliver Flint / Paul Fenwick	4 episodes
1995	Degrees of Error	Professor Marshall	3 episodes
1995	Performance	Bardolph	Episode: "Henry IV"
1996	Our Friends in the North	John Edwards	4 episodes
1996	Witness Against Hitler	Prison Governor	Television film
1996	The Famous Five	Binks	2 episodes
1996	Accused	Dan Chapman	4 episodes
1998	Mortimer's Law	Chris Borland	Episode: "#1.2"
1998	Duck Patrol	Malcolm White	8 episodes
1998	Goodnight Mister Tom	Ralph Briggs	Television film
1999	Kavanagh QC	Trevor Gregton	Episode: "Previous Convictions"
1999	The Bench	Cyril	Television film
1999–2009	Midsomer Murders	Harry Claypole / Colin Smy	2 episodes
2000	Longitude	Estate Manager	Television film
2000	Cor, Blimey!	Sid James	Television film
2000	Doctors	Chief Supt. Len Salter	Episode: "Family Law"
2000–2003	Bad Girls	Bobby Hollamby	4 episodes
2002	Holby City	George Fry	Episode: "Second Chances"
2002	Where the Heart Is	Ray Ballinger	Episode: "Count on Me"
2002	The Safe House	Det. Supt. Bill Matthews	Television film
2002	Foyle's War	Harold Smith	Episode: "Eagle Day"
2003	Down to Earth	Fenner / Mr. Fenner	2 episodes
2005	The Royal	Arthur Cordell	Episode: "Duty Bound"
2005	Heartbeat	Lionel Morris	Episode: "Shadows from the Past"
2005	Derailed	Robin Kellow	Television film
2005	Funland	Howdy Doodere	Episode: "#1.4"
2006	Hogfather	Mr. Brown	Television film as Geoffrey Hutchins
2007	Wild at Heart	Bill	Episode: "#2.2"
2007	Maxwell	George Wheeler	Television film
2007	The Whistleblowers	Fred Barrass	Episode: "Environment"
2008	The Colour of Magic	Picture Imp	2 episodes
2008	Sunshine	Bernard	Episode: "#1.2"
2009	Benidorm	Mel Harvey	15 episodes
2009	EastEnders	Roger	3 episodes
2010	Grandma's House	Grandpa	6 episodes
