= Cor, Blimey! =

2000 TV film

- Based on: Cleo, Camping, Emmanuelle and Dick by Terry Johnson
- Written by: Terry Johnson
- Directed by: Terry Johnson
- Starring: Geoffrey Hutchings; Samantha Spiro; Adam Godley
- Theme music composer: Barrington Pheloung

Production
- Producer: Margaret Mitchell
- Cinematography: Paul Wheeler
- Editor: Martin Sharpe
- Running time: 108 minutes
- Production company: Company Television

Original release
- Network: ITV
- Release: 24 April 2000

Cor, Blimey! is a 2000 TV film that follows the relationship between Carry On film actors Sid James (played by Geoffrey Hutchings) and Barbara Windsor (played by Samantha Spiro).

The film, first broadcast on ITV on 24 April 2000, was adapted by Terry Johnson from his stage play Cleo, Camping, Emmanuelle and Dick which debuted at the Royal National Theatre in 1998.

== Plot ==
Cor, Blimey! starts with the arrival of Sid James's new wardrobe assistant on the set of Carry On Cleo, at Pinewood Studios in 1963. Sid is depicted as a gambling womaniser with antipathy toward his professional rival, actor Kenneth Williams (played by Adam Godley).

James meets actress Barbara Windsor, who is at Pinewood to dub one of her scenes in Carry On Spying, and immediately falls for her; everyone, including Windsor, assumes he is just infatuated with her.

James pursues Windsor, keeping an eye on her during the famous flying-bikini-top scene in Carry On Camping. In 1973, he becomes obsessed with her while on location for Carry On Girls, and Windsor decides to sleep with him once, assuming that he would then lose interest; however, the two end up having a long affair.

By 1976, the affair is over; a few months later, James dies at the age of 62, after having a heart attack on stage during the opening night of The Mating Season at the Sunderland Empire Theatre.

The drama ends with Kenneth Williams reassuring Windsor that James's death was not her fault and Windsor encouraging the melancholic Williams to enjoy life more. For the final scene, Windsor replaced Spiro and played herself.

== Cast ==
- Geoffrey Hutchings as Sid James
- Samantha Spiro and Barbara Windsor as Barbara Windsor
- Adam Godley as Kenneth Williams
- Jacqueline Defferary as Sally
- Kenneth MacDonald as Eddie
- David McAlister as Gerald Thomas
- Hugh Walters as Charles Hawtrey
- Steve Spiers as Bernard Bresslaw
- Chrissie Cotterill as Joan Sims
- Louise Delamere as Imogen
- Derek Howard as Kenneth Connor
- Maria Charles as Alice Hawtrey
- Abigail McKern as Olga Lowe
- Windsor Davies as Sir Toby Belch

== Production ==
Geoffrey Hutchings found it difficult to play Sid James because there was little archive material of James as himself. The actor used James' distinctive "guttural laugh" as a "way in" to the character. Samantha Spiro "felt a sense of responsibility" playing Barbara Windsor, who appears as herself in the final scene.

== Basis in reality ==
The drama is a fictionalised account of the affair which happened between Windsor and James. Fellow Carry On actors Bernard Bresslaw, Kenneth Connor, Charles Hawtrey and Joan Sims are seen as minor characters.

The action covers the period from 1964 until Sid James' death on stage in 1976. However, events are not necessarily depicted in chronological order and a few liberties are taken with continuity. For example:

- Bernard Bresslaw is seen playing Harold Crump in Carry On Spying and Cardinal Wolsey in Carry On Henry when in fact these parts were played by Bernard Cribbins and Terry Scott respectively. Bresslaw did not make his debut until the 1965 film Carry On Cowboy.
- There is a mention of Jim Dale falling down hospital stairs before the production of Carry On Cleo but this is a reference to Carry On Again Doctor in 1969, five years after Cleo.
- Just before James's death, Barbara Windsor is seen walking off the set of Carry On Emmannuelle in disgust at the poor script when, in fact, she never went near the studios. Also, that film did not go into production until nearly two years after James's death.
- The scene in which Sid James reads of Tony Hancock's death follows a scene set in 1969. Yet Hancock died the previous year, 1968.
- At the time the film reaches its climax and portrays James's death, Carry On England had not even been filmed, yet Kenneth Williams refers to the movie and his disdain for it.
- In the scene immediately before his death in April 1976, James's dresser discusses leaving his employ to work on the Bond film You Only Live Twice, a film that was released back in 1967. In the same scene, she informs him that the transition of UK government from Edward Heath to Harold Wilson is taking place, an event that actually happened in February 1974.
- Kenneth Williams and Barbara Windsor finding out about James's death from the TV news together is also wrong - Windsor was informed at home by telephone after returning from rehearsing Twelfth Night at Chichester, and Williams found out by telephone from his agent after spending the evening with his mother.

== Reception ==
On Rotten Tomatoes, the film holds an approval rating of 63% based on 86 reviews, with a weighted average rating of 3.5/5.

Mark Lawson, writing for The Guardian, complimented Johnson's adaptation. He writes, "bringing the Carry On movies to television via the stage is his most complicated mixed-media installation yet, but it succeeds triumphantly ... Johnson understands how differently material needs to be shaped for theatre's rectangle of open air and television's oblong of glass." He praises the "depth and intelligence of Johnson's script." Lawson also praises Hutchings, Spiro and Godley's portrayals of James, Windsor and Williams respectively.

== See also ==
- Babs – Spiro reprises Barbara Windsor in the BBC 2017 Drama.
- Hattie – 2011 BBC television drama about Hattie Jacques
- Kenneth Williams: Fantabulosa! – 2004 BBC television drama about Kenneth Williams
