= Kenneth Williams: Fantabulosa! =

2006 TV programme, biography

- Written by: Martyn Hesford
- Directed by: Andy De Emmony
- Starring: Michael Sheen; Cheryl Campbell; Beatie Edney; Kenny Doughty
- Country of origin: United Kingdom

Production
- Running time: 79 mins

Original release
- Network: BBC Four
- Release: 13 March 2006

Kenneth Williams: Fantabulosa! is a 2006 BBC Four television play starring Michael Sheen as the British comic actor Kenneth Williams, based on Williams' own diaries. Cheryl Campbell plays Williams's mother, Lou.

Michael Sheen performed extensive research for the role, watching archive footage and reading books. He also followed the cabbage soup diet to lose 2.5 stone (35 lb; 16 kg) to play Williams.

Viewing figures were 860,000 for its original airing, including timeshift, making it by far the most popular BBC Four broadcast of March 2006. Its repeat showing on 17 March 2006 garnered another 252,000 viewers.

Sheen's performance won a Royal Television Society Award for Best Male Actor, and the play also won two BAFTA nominations (best single play and best actor, Michael Sheen).

It was released on DVD as Fantabulosa! – The Kenneth Williams Story in October 2009, and has been rebroadcast several times in the UK since its original airing.

== Cast ==
- Michael Sheen – Kenneth Williams
- Cheryl Campbell – Lou Williams
- Peter Wight – Charlie Williams
- Beatie Edney – Joan Sims
- Kenny Doughty – Joe Orton
- Ron Cook – Peter Eade
- Martin Trenaman – Tony Hancock
- David Charles – Charles Hawtrey
- Ewan Bailey – Kenneth Halliwell
- Rachel Clarke – Barbara Windsor
- Connor Garnett Comerford – Young Kenneth Williams
- Beatrice Comins – St Joan/Actress
- Timothy Davies – 1st Doctor
- Stephen Critchlow – Kenneth Horne
- Guy Henry – Hugh Paddick
- Ged McKenna – Sid James
- Nicholas Parsons – Himself

== Reception ==
The drama received good reviews, with Kathryn Flett of The Observer singling out Sheen's performance as "a characterisation for which the description tour-de-force is, frankly, pretty faint praise". The Times compared Sheen's performance to "a diamond that is so dazzling as a result of the expertise deployed in its cutting that you can't fully focus on the underlying shape of the stone, which is what actually enables it to glitter so spectacularly."

Accolades
Award	Date of ceremony	Category	Recipient	Result	Ref.
Royal Television Society Award	14 March 2007	Best Male Actor	Michael Sheen	Won	
BAFTA Awards	20 May 2007	Best Single Drama	Kenneth Williams: Fantabulosa!	Nominated	
BAFTA Awards	20 May 2007	Best Actor	Michael Sheen	Nominated	
Broadcasting Press Guild Award	23 March 2007	Best Actor	Michael Sheen	Nominated	

== See also ==
- Babs – 2017 BBC television drama about Barbara Windsor
- Cor, Blimey! – 2000 ITV television drama about Sid James and Barbara Windsor
- The Curse of Steptoe
- Hattie – 2011 BBC television drama about Hattie Jacques
- Prick Up Your Ears
