= Adam Godley =

English actor (b. 1964)

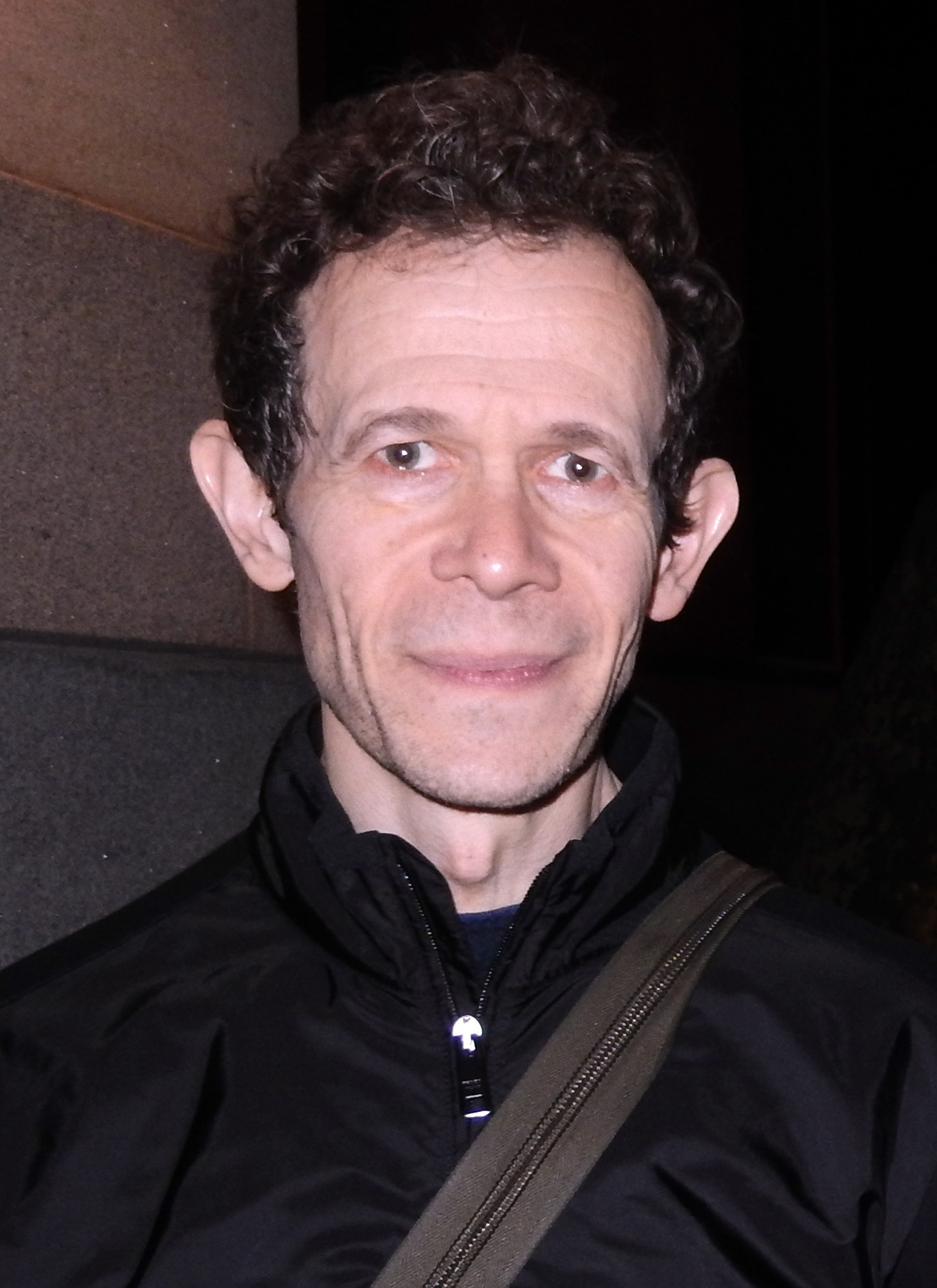
- Godley in 2019
- Born: 1963 or 1964 (age 62–63); Amersham, Buckinghamshire, England
- Citizenship: United Kingdom; United States
- Occupation: Actor
- Years active: 1975–present

Adam Godley (born 1963 or 1964) is an English and American actor. He has been nominated for two Tony Awards and four Laurence Olivier Awards for his performances on the New York and London stages, including Private Lives in 2001, The Pillowman in 2002, Anything Goes in 2011, and The Lehman Trilogy in 2019. Godley made his Broadway debut in 2002 in a revival of Noël Coward's Private Lives, for which he earned a Theatre World Award for Outstanding Broadway debut. In 2011, Godley returned to Broadway in the musical Anything Goes, for which he earned a Tony Award for Best Featured Actor in a Musical nomination. In 2021, The Lehman Trilogy made its Broadway transfer to great critical acclaim, and securing Godley another Tony nomination for Best Actor in a Play.

Godley's film roles include Love Actually (2003), Nanny McPhee (2005), Charlie and the Chocolate Factory (2005), Elizabeth: The Golden Age (2007), and The Theory of Everything (2014). He has also had television roles as Elliott Schwartz in Breaking Bad (2008–2013), Nigel Nesbitt in Suits (2013), Phinneus Pogo in The Umbrella Academy (2019–2024), and Archie the Archbishop in The Great (2020–2023).

== Early life ==
Adam Godley was born to Jewish parents in Amersham, the son of a magistrate mother and solicitor father. Godley grew up near Watford and went to Rickmansworth School in Croxley Green.

== Career ==
Godley began his acting career at the age of nine in a BBC radio production of Hemingway's short story "My Old Man". Godley's first stage role came at age 11, as Prince Giovanni in The White Devil at The Old Vic. His childhood career also included work at the National Theatre, in Lillian Helman's Watch on the Rhine, and Close of Play, directed by Harold Pinter. Godley achieved national prominence after playing the lead in the 1984 BBC TV adaptation of J. Meade Falkner's Moonfleet.

In 1986, Godley joined Alan Ayckbourn's theatre company in Scarborough, where he stayed for three seasons. Productions included June Moon and The Revengers' Comedies, both of which transferred to the West End, and Mr A's Amazing Maze Plays, which transferred to the National Theatre.

Godley spent one season as a member of the Royal Shakespeare Company, before creating the role of Cliff in Sam Mendes's production of Cabaret at the Donmar Warehouse in 1993. Several major productions followed, including Mouth to Mouth at the Royal Court, The Front Page at the Donmar, and The Rivals in the West End, after which Godley went on to create a series of roles at the National, including Kenneth Williams in Cleo, Camping, Emmanuelle and Dick; and the title role in Howard Davies' production of Paul. In 1999, Godley played John Worthing in the West End production of The Importance of Being Earnest.

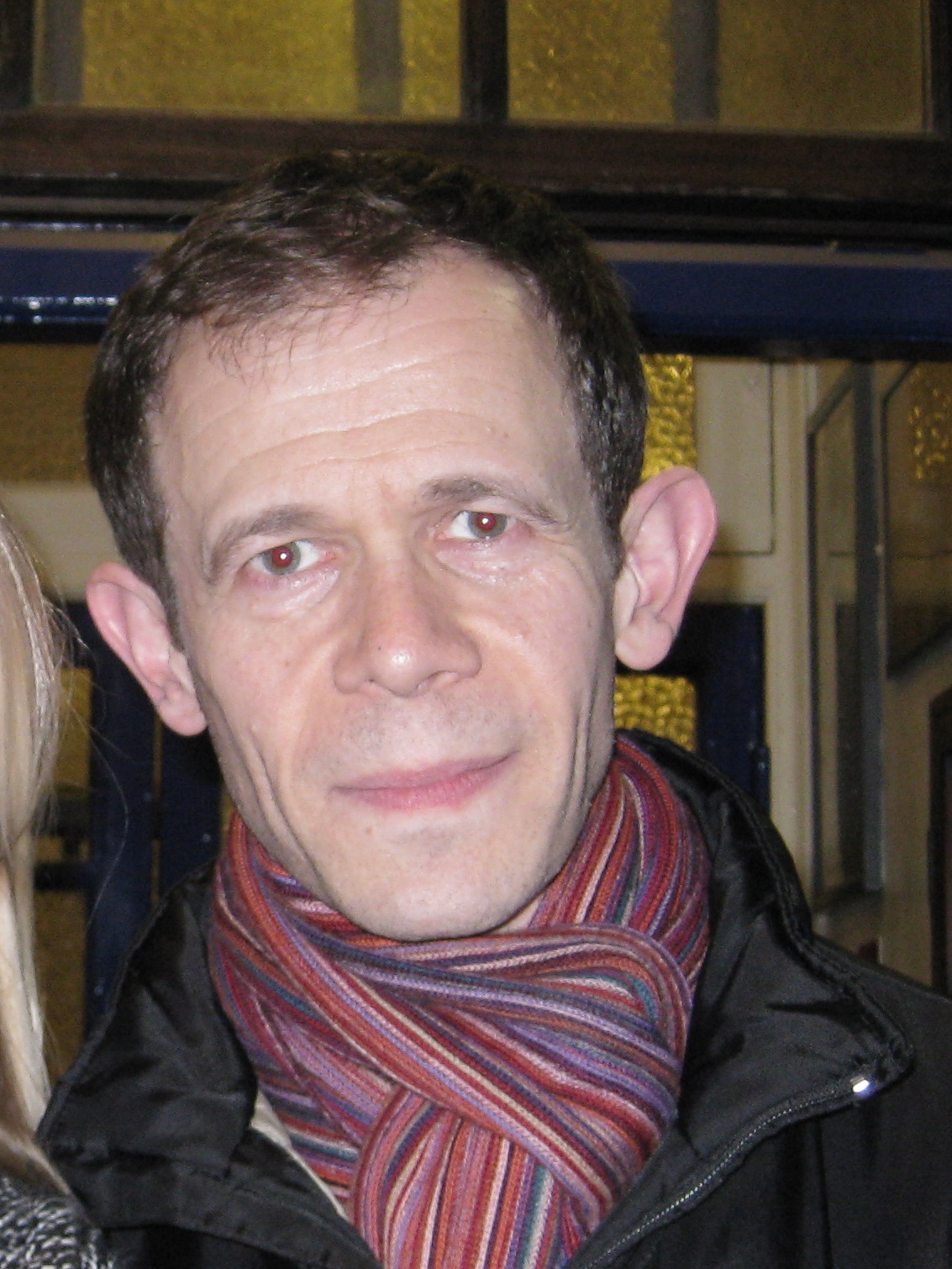
Godley in November 2008

In 2002, Godley made his film debut in Claude Lelouch's And Now... Ladies and Gentlemen, starring Jeremy Irons and Patricia Kaas, which premiered at the Cannes Film Festival. He continued acting in films such as the Christmas classic Love Actually (2003), Around the World in 80 Days (2004), Nanny McPhee (2005), and Charlie and the Chocolate Factory (2005).

In 2002, Godley made his Broadway debut when he starred as Victor Prynne alongside Alan Rickman and Lindsay Duncan in a revival of Noël Coward's Private Lives at the Richard Rogers Theatre in New York City. For his performance, Godley earned a Theatre World Award. The following year, he starred as Michal in Martin McDonagh's The Pillowman opposite Jim Broadbent and David Tennant at the Royal National Theatre.

In 2008, Godley played Raymond Babbitt in the West End production of Rain Man opposite Josh Hartnett. Two years later, Godley played Jonathan Powell in the HBO television film The Special Relationship about Tony Blair's relationship with Bill Clinton. Godley had recurring roles as Elliott Schwartz in AMC's Breaking Bad and Jocelyn Pugh in Lodge 49. Godley also appeared in BBC's A Young Doctor's Notebook (2011), CBS's The Good Wife (2012), USA Networks's Suits (2012), Showtime's Homeland (2015), and NBC's The Blacklist (2017). In 2011, he played Lord Evelyn Oakleigh in Roundabout Theatre's multi-award-winning Broadway revival of Anything Goes. The production starred Sutton Foster, John McMartin, Jessica Walter and Joel Grey. For his performance, Godley earned a Tony Award nomination, a Drama Desk Award nomination, and an Outer Critics Circle Award. In 2013, he led a new adaptation by Dennis Kelly of Georg Kaiser's 1912 German expressionist masterpiece, From Morning to Midnight, at the National Theatre.

Godley's most recent stage role was as one of the three Lehman brothers in the 2019 National Theatre's The Lehman Trilogy, for which he was nominated for the Laurence Olivier Award for Best Actor in a Play alongside Simon Russell Beale and Ben Miles. The play transferred to Broadway in 2021, where Godley received a Tony Award nomination for Best Actor in a Play along with Adrian Lester and Simon Russell Beale.

In 2023, Godley portrayed pollster Darwin Perry in the HBO drama series Succession episode "America Decides".

== Personal life ==
Godley is gay. He is a naturalised American citizen and lives in the Los Angeles area.

== Acting credits ==
=== Film ===
Year	Title	Role	Notes
2002	War Game	Lacey / Dad	Voice; short film
2002	And Now... Ladies and Gentlemen	Son of London Jeweller	
2002	Thunderpants	Placido P. Placeedo	
2003	Love Actually	Mr. Trench	
2004	Around the World in 80 Days	Mr. Sutton	
2005	Charlie and the Chocolate Factory	Mr. Teavee	
2005	Nanny McPhee	Vicar	
2007	Elizabeth: The Golden Age	William Walsingham	
2007	Son of Rambow	Brethren Leader	
2008	The X-Files: I Want to Believe	Father Ybarra	
2011	The Forger	Pinkus	
2012	Battleship	Dr. Nogrady	
2014	The Theory of Everything	Senior Doctor - Cambridge Hospital	
2016	The BFG	The Manhugger / Lout No. 1	
2018	Nightmare Cinema	Dr. Salvadore	
2019	Missing Link	Lord Bilge	Voice
2022	The People We Hate at the Wedding	Narrator	Voice

=== Television ===
Year	Title	Role	Notes
1978	A Horseman Riding By	Simon Craddock	3 episodes
1979	Thomas & Sarah	Tomlinson	1 episode
1984	Moonfleet	John Trenchard	6 episodes
1991, 1998	The Bill	Duxford/Nigel Penway	2 episodes
1992	An Ungentlemanly Act	P.C. Anton Livermore	Television film
1995	Class Act	Graham	1 episode
1996	The Detectives	D.C. Dominic Boyle	1 episode, "The Wembley Stadium Mystery"
1998	Casualty	Alan Decker	1 episode
2000	Cor, Blimey!	Kenneth Williams	Television film
2001	Sword of Honour	Apthorpe	Television film
2002	The Inspector Lynley Mysteries	Tony Phillips	1 episode
2003	Margery & Gladys	Graham Heywood	Television film
2004	Hawking	Frank Hawking	Television film
2006	Nuremberg: Nazis on Trial	Gustave Gilbert	Miniseries
2007	Coming Up	Paul	1 episode
2007	The Old Curiosity Shop	Sampson Brass	Television film
2008, 2013	Breaking Bad	Elliott Schwartz	3 episodes
2008	Terminator: The Sarah Connor Chronicles	The Scientist	1 episode
2008	Mad Men	Wayne Kirkeby	1 episode
2009	Numbers	Dr. Joseph Baskin	1 episode
2009	Merlin	Jonas	2 episodes
2009	Dollhouse	Clyde Randolph	1 episode
2010	Private Practice	Henry	1 episode
2010	Agatha Christie's Marple	Lomax	1 episode
2010	The Special Relationship	Jonathan Powell	Television film
2011	Lie to Me	Sandy Baxter	1 episode
2011	CHAOS	Jonathan Aldridge	1 episode
2011	Case Histories	Martin Canning	2 episodes
2012	A Young Doctor's Notebook	Demyan Lukich	Main role, 8 episodes
2012	Harry's Law	Hospital Administrator	1 episode
2012	The Good Wife	Leland Carlisle	1 episode
2012	Suburgatory	Mr. Jacobs	1 episode
2013	Spies of Warsaw	Julius Halbech	Miniseries
2013	Elementary	British Man	Uncredited voice role, 1 episode
2013	Suits	Nigel Alexander Nesbitt	Recurring role, 5 episodes
2014	Perception	Teddy Brennan	1 episode
2014	Manhattan	Dr. Adelman	3 episodes
2014	Homeland	Jordan Harris	1 episode
2015–2016	Powers	Captain Emile Cross	Main role, 20 episodes
2015	The Blacklist	Silas Gouldsberry	1 episode
2017	Fallet	DCI Tom Brown	Main role, 8 episodes
2018–2019	Lodge 49	Jocelyn Pugh	Recurring role, 10 episodes
2019–2024	The Umbrella Academy	Phinneus Pogo	Main role, 16 episodes Voice and motion capture role
2020–2023	The Great	Archbishop "Archie"	Main role, 30 episodes
2021–2025	The Great North	Dick Chateau / Archie	Voice role, 5 episodes
2022	Bob's Burgers	Ghost	Voice role, 1 episode
2023	Succession	Darwin Perry	1 episode
2025	Down Cemetery Road	Joe Silverman	2 episodes
2025	The Copenhagen Test	Frederick Schiff	7 episodes

=== Theatre ===
Year	Title	Role	Theatre
1976	The White Devil	Prince Giovanni	The Old Vic
1979	Close Of Play	Matthew	National Theatre
1980	Watch on the Rhine	Joshua Muller	National Theatre
1987	An Inspector Calls	Eric Birling	Westminster Theatre
1991	The Revengers' Comedies	Oliver Knightly	The Strand Theatre
1992	June Moon	Fred Stevens	Vaudeville Theatre
1993	Mr A's Amazing Maze Plays	Neville	National Theatre
1993	A Going Concern	David	Hampstead Theatre
1993	Cabaret	Cliff Bradshaw	Donmar Warehouse
1994	The Rivals	Faulkland	Albery Theatre
1996	The White Devil; Three Hours After Marriage; The General From America	Camilo; Underplot; Majot André	Royal Shakespeare Company
1997	The Wood Demon	Fyodor	Playhouse Theatre
1997	The Front Page	Bensinger	Donmar Warehouse
1998	Cleo, Camping, Emmanuelle and Dick	Kenneth Williams	National Theatre
1999	The Importance of Being Earnest	John Worthing	Haymarket Theatre
2000	Mr Kolpert	Ralf	Royal Court Theatre
2001	Mouth to Mouth	Dr Gompertz	Royal Court Theatre
2002	Private Lives	Victor Prynne	Richard Rodgers Theater, Broadway
2003	The Pillowman	Michal	National Theatre
2005	Two Thousand Years	Jonathan	National Theatre
2005	Paul	Paul	National Theatre
2008	Rain Man	Raymond Babbitt	Apollo Theatre
2011	Anything Goes	Lord Evelyn Oakleigh	Stephen Sondheim Theater, Broadway
2013	From Morning to Midnight	The Bank Clerk	National Theatre
2018	The Lehman Trilogy	Mayer Lehman	National Theatre
2019	The Lehman Trilogy	Mayer Lehman	Park Avenue Armory
2019	The Lehman Trilogy	Mayer Lehman	Piccadilly Theatre
2021	The Lehman Trilogy	Mayer Lehman	Nederlander Theater, Broadway
2023	Once Upon a One More Time	Narrator	Marquis Theater, Broadway

=== Audio plays ===
Year	Title	Role	Notes
1975	My Old Man	Joe	BBC Radio
1977	Sister Ninian's Nightingale	Johnny Dean	BBC Radio
1977	These Modern Ways	Grisha	BBC Radio
1979	The Rocking Horse Winner	Paul	BBC Radio
1979	The Happiest Days of Your Life	Hopcroft	BBC Radio
1994	Wide Sargasso Sea	Rochester	BBC Radio
1998	The Ghost Train	Teddy Deakin	BBC Radio
2001	Tess of the d'Urbervilles	Alec d'Urberville	BBC Radio
2003	Strangers and Brothers	Lewis Eliot	BBC Radio
2004	Black Beauty	Black Beauty	BBC Radio
2004	Mort	Cutwell	BBC Radio
2004	Christopher Himself	Christopher Isherwood	BBC Radio
2004–2007	The Brothers	Nigel	BBC Radio
2005	The Madness of George III	The Prince of Wales	BBC Radio
2006	Another Country	Vaughan	BBC Radio
2009	Dr Jekyll and Mr Hyde	Dr Jekyll	BBC Radio
2010	She Stoops to Conquer	Tony Lumpkin	LA Theatre Works
2011	Strangers and Brothers	Lewis Elliot	BBC Radio
2011	The Bungler	Lélie	LA Theatre Works
2018	An Enemy of the People	Peter Stockman	BBC Radio
2022	Moriarty: The Devil's Game	Dr. Watson	Audible Original

== Awards and nominations ==
Year	Awards	Category	Work	Result
1999	Laurence Olivier Awards	Best Actor in a Supporting Role in a Play	Cleo, Camping, Emanuelle and Dick	Nominated
2002	Theatre World Awards	Outstanding Broadway Debut	Private Lives	Won
2002	Laurence Olivier Awards	Best Actor in a Supporting Role in a Play	Mouth to Mouth	Nominated
2008	Evening Standard Theatre Awards	Best Actor in a Leading Role in a Play	Rain Man	Nominated
2009	WhatsOnStage Awards	Best Actor in a Play	Rain Man	Nominated
2009	Laurence Olivier Awards	Best Actor in a Leading Role in a Play	Rain Man	Nominated
2011	Tony Awards	Best Performance by a Featured Actor in a Musical	Anything Goes	Nominated
2011	Drama Desk Awards	Outstanding Featured Actor in a Musical	Anything Goes	Nominated
2011	Outer Critics Circle Awards	Outstanding Featured Actor in a Musical	Anything Goes	Won
2019	Laurence Olivier Awards	Best Actor in a Leading Role in a Play (shared with Simon Russell Beale and Ben Miles)	The Lehman Trilogy	Nominated
2021	Screen Actors Guild Awards	Outstanding Performance by an Ensemble in a Comedy Series	The Great	Nominated
2022	Screen Actors Guild Awards	Outstanding Performance by an Ensemble in a Comedy Series	The Great	Nominated
2022	Tony Awards	Best Performance by a Leading Actor in a Play	The Lehman Trilogy	Nominated
2022	Outer Critics Circle Awards	Outstanding Actor in a Play	The Lehman Trilogy	Nominated
