= Hattie (film) =

2011 British film

- Based on: Hattie: The Authorised Biography of Hattie Jacques by Andy Merriman
- Written by: Stephen Russell
- Directed by: Dan Zeff
- Starring: Ruth Jones; Robert Bathurst; Aidan Turner
- Theme music composer: Stephen McKeon

Production
- Producers: Seb Barwell; Richard Osborne
- Cinematography: Ian Moss
- Editor: Lois Bygrave
- Running time: 85 minutes
- Production company: Angel Eye Media

Original release
- Network: BBC Four
- Release: 19 January 2011

Hattie is a television film about the life of British comic actress Hattie Jacques, played by Ruth Jones, her marriage to John Le Mesurier (Robert Bathurst) and her affair with their lodger John Schofield (Aidan Turner). First broadcast in January 2011, it became the most watched programme on BBC Four ever and outdid biopic The Curse of Steptoe, which had held the record since 2008. Jacques' son Robin Le Mesurier later described Jones' performance as "(having) captured my mother perfectly".

== Cast ==
- Ruth Jones as Hattie Jacques
- Robert Bathurst as John Le Mesurier
- Aidan Turner as John Schofield
- Jeany Spark as Joan Malin
- Jay Simpson as Bruce
- Graham Fellows as Eric Sykes
- Marcia Warren as Esma Cannon
- Stephen Critchlow as Gerald Thomas
- Susy Kane as Young Actress
- Lewis MacLeod as Eamonn Andrews
- Brian Pettifer as Ron
- James Martin as Reg

== See also ==
- Babs – 2017 BBC television drama about Barbara Windsor
- Cor, Blimey! – 2000 ITV television drama about Sid James and Barbara Windsor
- Kenneth Williams: Fantabulosa! – 2006 BBC television drama about Kenneth Williams
