= Reina James =

British author (born 1947)

- Born: 26 April 1947 (age 78)
- Occupations: Actress, singer and author
- Spouse: Mike Reinstein (m. 1991)
- Children: 1
- Parent(s): Sid James; Meg Williams

Reina James (born 1947) is a British author, singer and actress.

She has written two novels, the first of which won the Society of Authors' McKitterick Prize in 2007.

== Early life ==
James was born in 1947, shortly after her parents moved to the UK from South Africa. Her father was the actor Sid James. During her teenage years she played in a folk group before marrying and starting a family. In her late 20s she appeared in the stage play John, Paul, George, Ringo ... and Bert by Willy Russell, and later appeared in Russell's musical Blood Brothers.

== Writing career ==
Having worked since the 1980s as an astrological counsellor, James published her first novel, This Time of Dying in 2007, which won the Society of Authors' McKitterick Prize, awarded for the best first novel by a writer over the age of 40. Her second novel, The Old Joke, was published in 2009.

== Family ==
James has been married to her second husband Mike Reinstein, a musician, since 1991. She has one son, Jonathan, and one grandchild (through her first marriage).
