= Grandma's House =

British TV sitcom

Coordinates: 51.5840°N 0.0648°E

- Genre: Sitcom
- Created by: Simon Amstell
- Written by: Simon Amstell; Dan Swimer
- Directed by: Christine Gernon
- Starring: Simon Amstell; Linda Bassett; Geoffrey Hutchings; Rebecca Front; James Smith; Samantha Spiro; Jamal Hadjkura; Vincent Franklin
- Country of origin: United Kingdom
- Original language: English
- No. of series: 2
- No. of episodes: 12 (list of episodes)

Production
- Executive producers: Sophie Clarke-Jervoise; Simon Lupton
- Producer: Ben Cavey
- Running time: 30 minutes
- Production company: Tiger Aspect Productions

Original release
- Network: BBC Two
- Release: 9 August 2010 – 24 May 2012

Grandma's House is a sitcom television series broadcast on BBC Two. Written by Simon Amstell and long-term collaborator Dan Swimer, the series stars Simon Amstell playing a version of himself: an ex-television presenter searching for meaning in his life. Each episode takes place at his grandmother's house, where Grandma (Linda Bassett) welcomes her family, desperate to see everyone happy.

The first series was shown in 2010, the second in 2012. In December 2012 Amstell stated that there would not be a third series.

== Cast and characters ==
Character	Actor/actress	Series	Duration	Notes
Simon	Simon Amstell	1–2	2010–12	
Grandma (Lily)	Linda Bassett	1–2	2010–12	Simon and Adam's grandmother
Grandpa (Bernie)	Geoffrey Hutchings	1	2010	Simon and Adam's grandfather
Tanya	Rebecca Front	1–2	2010–12	Simon's mother
Clive	James Smith	1–2	2010–12	Tanya's fiancé
Liz	Samantha Spiro	1–2	2010–12	Simon's aunt
Adam	Jamal Hadjkura	1–2	2010–12	Simon's cousin
Ben Theodore	Iwan Rheon	1-2	2010–12	Simon's love interest
Barry	Vincent Franklin	2	2012	Liz's husband
Mark	Oliver Coopersmith	2	2012	School friend of Adam

== Production ==
The show was created and written by Simon Amstell and Dan Swimer. Six 30-minutes episodes were produced for the first series by Tiger Aspect Productions for BBC Two. These were filmed at Pinewood Studios.

The house used for exterior filming is located in Highwood Gardens in Clayhall, Greater London.

On 1 July 2010, Geoffrey Hutchings, who portrayed Grandpa, died. The death of his character was said to have occurred between the two series.

== Episodes ==
=== Series 1 (2010) ===
No. overall	No. in season	Title	Directed by	Original release date	UK viewers (millions)
1	1	"The Day Simon Told His Family About His Important Decision"	Christine Gernon	9 August 2010	1.56
When Simon tells his mum Tanya that he's quitting the programme he presents, she is less than happy. While Simon struggles to make his mum realise that her new boyfriend Clive might not be the right man for her, Grandpa has discovered something that will leave Grandma in a panic. Meanwhile, Auntie Liz is struggling with her son Adam, who appears to be starting a teenage rebellion.
2	2	"The Day Simon Decided It Might Be a Nice Idea to Surprise His Mother with a Gift"	Christine Gernon	16 August 2010	1.11
Simon has bought his mum, Tanya, an extravagant gift which she refuses to accept. He's also trying to convince her that maybe she shouldn't marry Clive. Meanwhile, it's Liz's birthday but nobody seems to care. Grandad has news from the doctor about his cancer scare and Simon has decided he might write a play for the theatre. However, his family isn't impressed.
3	3	"The Day Simon Announced That He Was in Control of the Universe"	Christine Gernon	23 August 2010	1.06
Simon has fallen in love. He's also read a book which leads him to believe that he might be able to control the universe. The family aren’t very impressed with either. Grandpa has invited Deborah Adler to visit, Grandma doesn’t like her and is less than happy. Liz has had to take extreme measures to try to get her son Adam into a new school. Guest starring Pam Ferris and Iwan Rheon.
4	4	"The Day Simon Decided He Was Forlorn"	Christine Gernon	30 August 2010	1.22
Simon is having a life crisis and is depressed. The situation is exacerbated when a guest he interviewed on his show attacks him in the press. Tanya moves into Clive's house, much to Simon's irritation. Meanwhile, Grandma and Grandpa plan a cruise.
5	5	"The Day Simon Felt the Family Was Ready to Be Healed"	Christine Gernon	6 September 2010	0.990
Simon has been on a life-changing course and has decided it's his job to heal the family. He starts by giving his Granddad an exercise ball. Tanya has had a realisation that maybe Clive isn't the man for her, and when the family discover that Simon has organised a surprise for them, they are fearful what Grandma might do to him. Guest starring Allan Corduner.
6	6	"The Day Simon Finally Found the Strength to Accept That His Mother Was Getting Married"	Christine Gernon	13 September 2010	0.770
When Grandpa is taken ill, it's unsure whether Tanya and Clive will be able to get married today. Grandma takes on the responsibility of trying to resolve the situation, but is she right to advise Tanya to get married? Meanwhile, Liz has a favour to ask of Simon which might help Adam sort out his schooling problems.

=== Series 2 (2012) ===
No. overall	No. in season	Title	Directed by	Original release date	UK viewers (millions)
7	1	"The Day Simon Officially Became a Very Good and Totally Employable Actor"	Christine Gernon	19 April 2012	0.980
Simon, now living at his Grandma's house, has had a one night stand with Mark, a just-turned-sixteen classmate of Adam. Simon's grandma is refusing to acknowledge the death of Simon's grandad. Liz and Tanya are not getting on. Clive is attempting to win Tanya back, employing his knowledge about damp as an excuse to be around the house.
8	2	"The Day Simon Thought It May Be a Good Idea to Find New Living Arrangements"	Christine Gernon	26 April 2012	0.754
Liz's husband Barry makes a rare appearance at the house however makes it clear that he has no desire to be there. Adam discloses that Barry has access to a London flat in Soho that Simon, who is auditioning for Ben Theodore's new play, wants to rent if he wins the part, however he has to navigate Barry's personality first.
9	3	"The Day Simon Attempted to Express Actual Feelings Just Like a Person"	Christine Gernon	3 May 2012	0.615
Having won the part in The Tempest Simon tries to learn how to cry for the role while worrying over his Grandma's new habit of stealing her friends animal replicas and trying to deal with Clive who has slept over in the loft after a drinking relapse.
10	4	"The Day Simon Was Really Determined to Heal His Grandma's Pain"	Christine Gernon	10 May 2012	0.589
Simon has a date with Ben Theodore and has arranged for his Grandma to see a psychotherapist/acting coach to deal with her grief. But their lift down to London is delayed by Clive's revelation that he kissed Liz when they went to see Shrek The Musical.
11	5	"The Day Simon Found Himself Back on the Path to Fulfilment and Joy"	Christine Gernon	17 May 2012	0.698
Tanya is thrilled when Simon finally makes his big TV comeback, even though it is just a short interview to promote his play. Simon is starting to feel validated as an artist – however, a tiny off-the-cuff comment he makes about an opera singer's tumour is picked up by a popular newspaper, who really do not like that sort of thing.
12	6	"The Day Simon and His Family Opened the Door to Acceptance"	Christine Gernon	24 May 2012	0.740
It's Tanya and Clive's wedding day again, but Simon has other concerns as he is given a lesson in tough love. His play is also in jeopardy since director Ben Theodore has suddenly dropped out. Meanwhile Barry has gone missing, Adam finds new love, and all of Simon's problems could be resolved as Ben arrives with wonderful news. Guest starring Iwan Rheon and Jessie Cave

== Critical reception ==
The show received a generally positive reaction from critics and audiences alike. TV.com's Ruth Margolis claimed that "[Amstell's] written a sitcom stuffed with gently funny moments and acerbic gems", but suggested "a few more naturalistic pauses would have just polished this into the self-assured comedy it so wants to be." Other publications had differing opinions. The UK's Metro newspaper stated on their website that "[Amstell's] brilliantly funny but we won't be inviting him round for tea." Sam Wollaston of The Guardian asked, "Can Simon act, though? Well, it's hard to know really, given that he's essentially just being himself", but comes around to the opinion that "Grandma's House is sharply written, with some nice lines and a bit of edge to it." Two weeks later, Wollaston revealed, "I'm enjoying Grandma's House more and more (...) there's a subtlety and a sharpness about it. And yeah, it's funny."

Jewish media outlets such as the Jewish Chronicle were pleased that the show was bringing Jewish humour to mainstream audiences, and the newspaper also described the show as "genius".

== Awards ==
Year	Award	Category	Nominee	Result	Refs
2010	British Comedy Award	Best Female Comedy Breakthrough Artist	Samantha Spiro as Auntie Liz	Won	
2010	British Comedy Award	Best New TV Comedy	Grandma's House	Nominated	

== DVD release ==
2 Entertain released the first series of Grandma's House on DVD on 20 September 2010; it includes all six episodes, a making-of documentary, a booklet and an audio commentary on one of the episodes by Amstell and his mother.

== International broadcast ==
In Australia, the first season commenced airing on ABC2 each Thursday at 10pm from 23 February 2012.
