= Luke Allen-Gale =

British actor

- Occupation: Actor
- Years active: 2008–present

Luke Allen-Gale is a British actor who has had roles in the apocalyptic series Dominion and in the ITV television show Monroe.

== Career ==
Born in Dorset, he trained at the Drama Centre London and made his acting debut in 2008 on Wallander alongside Kenneth Branagh. Between 2011 and 2012 he had a recurring role in the TV series Monroe as Daniel Springer. Allen-Gale also had a recurring role as William Whele in the series Dominion between 2014 and 2015.

He made his professional West End stage debut in 2014 as Nicky Lockridge in Richard Greenberg's The American Plan, which transferred to the St James Theatre in London from Theatre Royal, Bath.

Allen-Gale has had roles in a number of short films between 2009 and 2011. In 2010 he provided the voice of Spiller in the UK adaptation of the animated film The Secret World of Arrietty. In 2016, Allen-Gale took had a lead role as Inspector Godfrey in The CW TV Movie Transylvania.

He has also done voice acting for the BBC Radio 4's series GF Newman's The Corrupted, and in the video games Quantum Break, Final Fantasy XIV, Ryse: Son of Rome and Forza Horizon 4.

== Filmography ==
=== Film ===
Year	Title	Role	Notes
2009	Undead Union: The Making of	Michael Wolfe	Short
2009	Rocky's Bike	Craig	Short
2010	The Secret World of Arrietty	Spiller	UK version, voice
2011	Captain America: The First Avenger	Army Heckler	
2011	Candy	Iggy	Short
2016	Transylvania	Inspector Godfrey	TV movie
2018	Toy Gun	Ruggero Levati	
2019	Doom: Annihilation	Dr. Bennett Stone	Direct-to-video

=== Television ===
Year	Title	Role	Notes
2008	Wallander	Robert Modin	Episode: Firewall
2009	Kröd Mändoon and the Flaming Sword of Fire	Lord Roderick	Episode: Our Bounties Ourselves
2011	The Promise	Corporal Jackie Clough	TV mini-series
2011	Midsomer Murders	Dave Doggy Day	Episode: Death in the Slow Lane
2011	Death in Paradise	Adam Fairs	Episode: #1.2
2011–2012	Monroe	Daniel Springer	
2013	Ripper Street	Ezekiel Bruton	Episode: A Man of My Company
2013	Endeavour	Derek Clark	Episode: Girl
2013	The Borgias	Fredirigo	3 episodes
2014–2015	Dominion	William Whele	
2016	Jericho	Giles Sorsby	Episode: #1.4
2016	Crazyhead	Sawyer	2 episodes
2017	Babs	Ronnie Knight	TV movie
2019	Moving On	Greg	Series 10 Episode 3 Isabelle
2020–2026	Van Der Valk	Brad de Vries	
2023	Silent Witness (TV series)	Sergeant Mike Laing	Series 26 Episodes 9 & 10 ‘Southbay’

=== Video games ===
Year	Title	Role	Notes
2017	Final Fantasy XIV: Stormblood	Zenos yae Galvus, Carvallain de Gorgagne	
2019	Dissidia Final Fantasy NT	Zenos yae Galvus	
2019	Final Fantasy XIV: Shadowbringers	Zenos yae Galvus, Grithil, Sicard	
2020	Forza Horizon 4	Billy	
2021	Final Fantasy XIV: Endwalker	Zenos yae Galvus, Sicard	
