= Audrey Jeans =

English singer and comedienne (1929–1980)

- Born: Audrey Stella Jennings; 27 July 1929; Landport, Portsmouth, England
- Died: 9 August 1980 (aged 51); Normandy, France
- Occupation(s): Comedian, singer
- Years active: 1941–1980

Audrey Jeans (born Audrey Stella Jennings; 27 July 1929 – 9 August 1980) was an English singer and comedienne.

== Life and career ==
She was born in Landport, Portsmouth. She first appeared on stage at the age of 12 in a local dancing troupe, and then, at 14, appeared in pantomime in Exeter. In the early part of her career she used the name Fay Bolton, incorporating her mother's maiden name. In 1946, as Audrey Jeans, she made her London debut appearing with Sid Field and Terry-Thomas in the revue Piccadilly Hayride, and from then on worked mainly in comedy.

She toured Australia with Arthur Askey in 1950 but then, after returning to England, left the theatre and worked in a local shop. After a few years she was persuaded to return to the stage, appearing with George Formby and others at the London Palladium. Jeans started to develop her own variety and comedy act, as well as working as a feed for other comedians. She married Harold Frank, an accountant, and lived in Purley, Surrey. In 1954, she featured regularly in the BBC radio show Ted Ray Time. During the mid and late 1950s, Jeans appeared on stage in a string of variety shows with many of the top comedians and singers of the period, and toured internationally. She also had a brief recording career with Decca.

Jeans continued her career in variety shows, pantomimes, and occasional television appearances, during the 1960s and 1970s. According to entertainer Roy Hudd, "most top funny ladies... were grotesques [but] Audrey was an attractive, beautifully dressed woman who could dance, sing... play sketches, deliver one-liners, get laughs, and act." She played a leading role in the Yorkshire TV series The Witches Brew (1972-73), with Peter Goodwright. In 1976, she was performing on stage with comic actor Sid James in the farce The Mating Season at the Sunderland Empire, when James suddenly collapsed with a fatal heart attack.

In 1980, Jeans and Harold Frank divorced, and she married Cyril Giddy. While on honeymoon in Normandy, she and her husband were walking when a car crashed into them, and she died immediately. The hit-and-run driver was never apprehended. She was 51.
