= Chitra Ramaswamy =

British writer

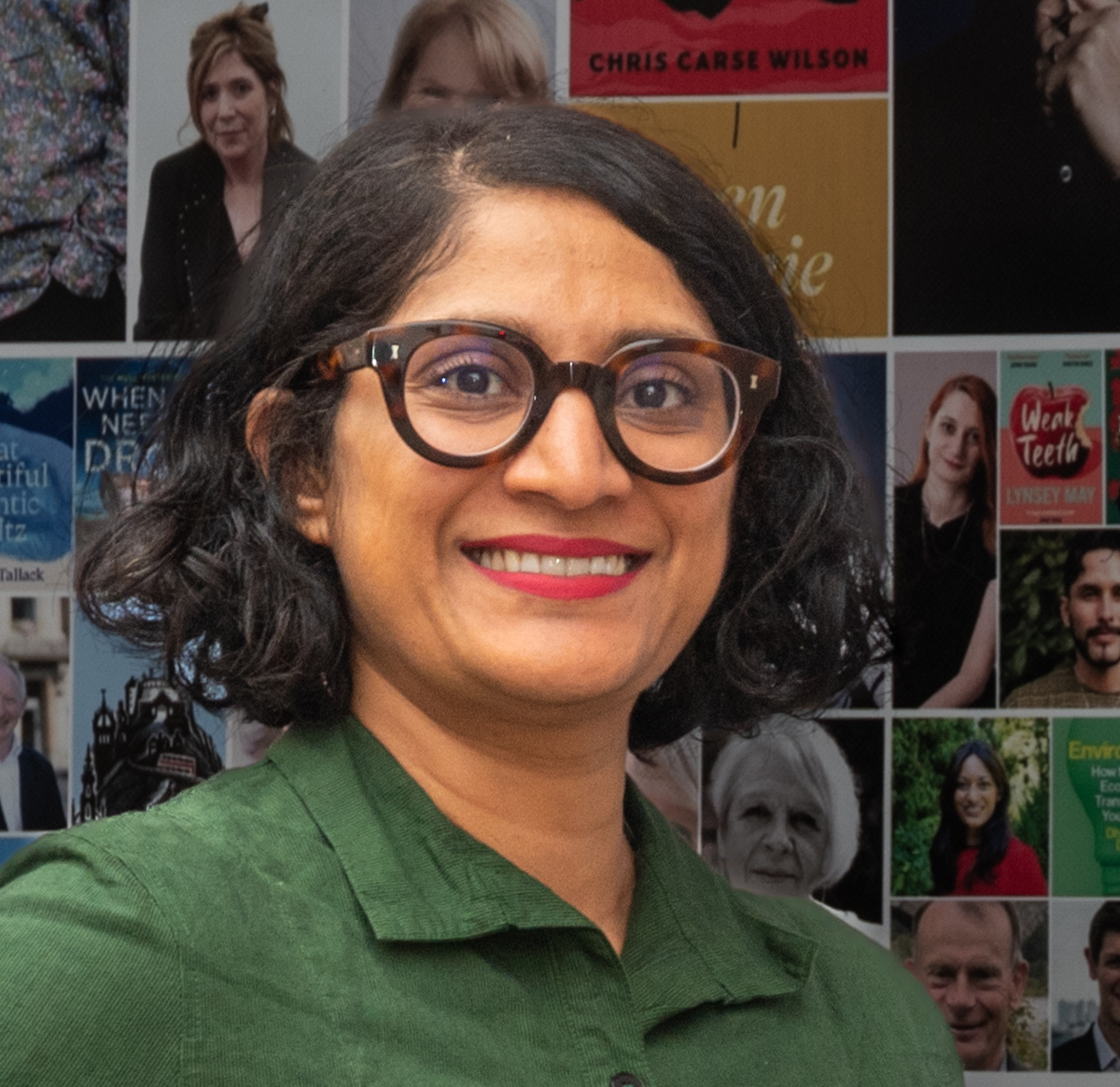
- Ramaswamy at the 2024 St. Andrew's Book Festival
- Born: 1979 (age 46–47)
- Education: University of Glasgow (BA)
- Occupation: Journalist

Chitra Ramaswamy is a British journalist of South Asian descent. Her books are Homelands: The History of a Friendship, published by Canongate Books, and Expecting: The Inner Life of Pregnancy, published by Saraband.

Ramaswamy is currently a restaurant critic in Scotland for the Alba supplement in the Scottish edition of The Times. She was one of The Guardian's TV reviewers.

== Biography ==
Ramaswamy grew up in Richmond, London. She has a BA degree in English Literature from the University of Glasgow. She is bisexual and lives in Edinburgh, Scotland, with her partner Claire and two children.

== Awards and honours ==
In 2016, Ramaswamy won a Scottish first book award: Saltire Society Literary Awards' First Book of the Year Award. and was shortlisted for the Polari Prize In 2022, Homelands: The History of a Friendship was listed by The Guardian as one of its memoirs of 2022. and the Saltire Society Non-Fiction Book of the Year.

== Books ==
- Expecting: The Inner Life of Pregnancy (2016, Saraband, ISBN 978-1-9101-9221-4)
- Homelands: The History of a Friendship (2022, Canongate Books, ISBN 978-1-8388-5266-5)
