= Barbara Windsor =

English actress (1937–2020)

Dame Barbara Windsor DBE
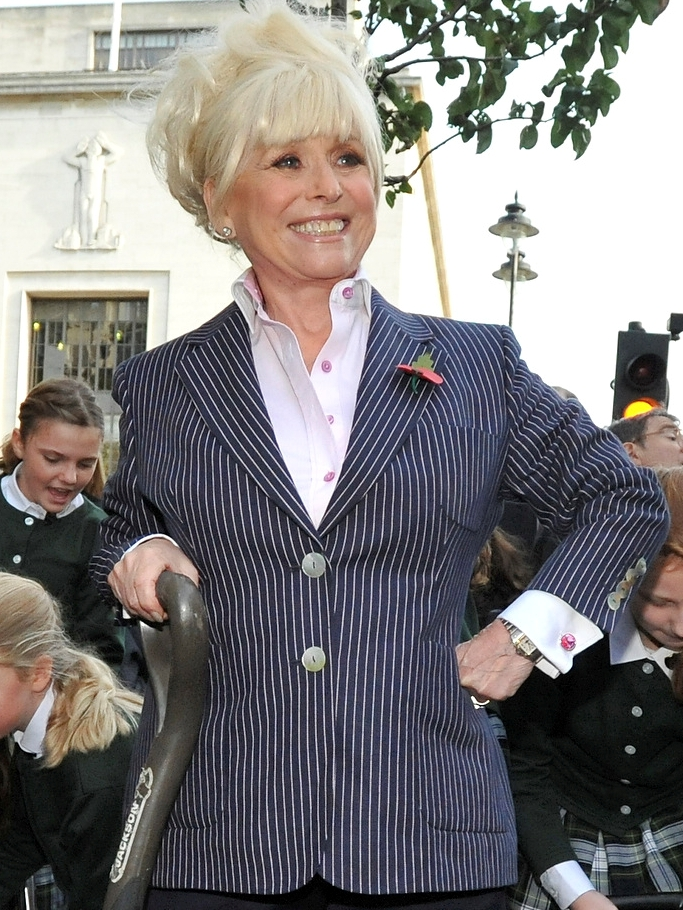
- Windsor in 2010
- Born: Barbara Ann Deeks; 6 August 1937; Shoreditch, London, England
- Died: 10 December 2020 (aged 83); Stanmore, London, England
- Resting place: Golders Green Crematorium
- Occupation: Actress
- Years active: 1950–2017
- Spouses: Ronnie Knight (m. 1964; div. 1985) Stephen Hollings (m. 1986; div. 1995) Scott Mitchell (m. 2000)
- Windsor's voice recorded in 2012, as part of an audio description of the Theatre Royal Stratford East for VocalEyes

Signature
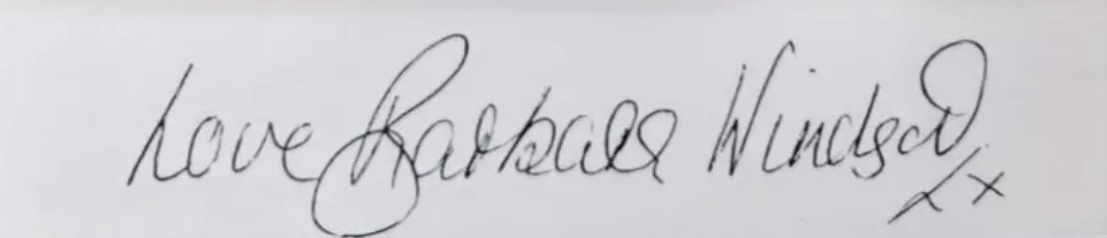

Dame Barbara Windsor (born Barbara Ann Deeks; 6 August 1937 – 10 December 2020) was an English actress. She was known for her roles in the Carry On films and for playing Peggy Mitchell in the BBC One soap opera EastEnders. She joined the cast of EastEnders in 1994 and won the 1999 British Soap Award for Best Actress, before leaving the show in 2016.

Windsor began her career on stage in 1950 at the age of 13, and made her film debut as a schoolgirl in The Belles of St. Trinian's (1954) while studying shipping management at Bow Technical College. She received a BAFTA Award nomination for the film Sparrows Can't Sing (1963), and a Tony Award nomination for the 1964 Broadway production of Oh, What a Lovely War!. In 1972, she starred opposite Vanessa Redgrave in the West End production of The Threepenny Opera.

Between 1964 and 1974, she appeared in nine Carry On films, including Carry On Spying (1964), Carry On Doctor (1967), Carry On Camping (1969), Carry On Henry (1971), and Carry On Abroad (1972). She also co-presented the 1977 Carry On compilation That's Carry On!. Windsor also starred in all four "Carry On Christmas" Thames TV specials, and appeared in both series of the 1975 ATV sitcom "Carry On Laughing". Outside of Carry On, her other film roles included A Study in Terror (1965), Chitty Chitty Bang Bang (1968), and as the voice of Mallymkun, the Dormouse in Alice in Wonderland (2010) and Alice Through the Looking Glass (2016).

Windsor was made a Dame (DBE) in the 2016 New Year Honours for services to charity and entertainment. She was awarded the British Soap Award for Outstanding Achievement in 2010, as well as the Freedom of the City of London in 2010.

== Early life ==
Windsor was born on 6 August 1937 in Shoreditch, London (though her birth was registered in Stepney), the only child of John Deeks, a bus driver, and his wife, Rose (née Ellis), a dressmaker. The family lived on Angela Street. Her maternal great-grandmother was the daughter of Irish immigrants who fled to Great Britain from Ireland between 1845 and 1852 in order to escape the Great Famine.

In 1939, at the start of World War II, Windsor's father was called up for the war, so Windsor and her mother went to live with her mother's family in Yoakley Road, Stoke Newington, where Windsor attended St Mary's Infants' School in nearby Lordship Road.

Windsor's mother initially refused to let her be evacuated, but conceded after one of Windsor's school friends was killed by a bomb during an air raid. Aged 6, Windsor was evacuated to Blackpool to live with a couple, but they attempted to sexually abuse her. A neighbour heard Windsor's screams and alerted the authorities. The couple were arrested and were found to not be married, but to be brother and sister.

Windsor moved in with a schoolfriend and her parents, although they struggled to cope with her loud behaviour. They sent Windsor to dancing school, which sparked her interest in performing, although one night after a class, Windsor found her friend's father kissing another woman in a bus shelter. Humiliated by this, Windsor was sent back to London in 1944 along with a note from her dance teacher which read: "Barbara is a born show-off who loves to perform."

Impressed by this, Windsor's mother sent her to Madame Behenna's Juvenile Jollities, a drama school at which she appeared in several charity concerts and pantomimes. After the war, she passed her 11-plus exams, gaining the top mark in North London, and earned a scholarship for a place at Our Lady's Catholic High School, Stamford Hill, although she was expelled because she argued with the reverend mother after the latter refused to let Windsor have time off to appear in a pantomime.

Windsor moved to the Aida Foster School, Golders Green, and took elocution lessons. When Windsor's father came to watch a performance, she was ridiculed by the others as her father had begun working as a trolley bus conductor and had come in his uniform. Enraged, Windsor covered the girls in theatrical face powder, throwing more over the chaperone who tried to stop her. Despite this, Windsor was chosen to appear in the chorus of the successful musical Love From Judy in the West End in 1952, which ran for two years. Her stage name of "Windsor" was inspired by the Coronation of Elizabeth II in 1953. By the time she was 16, Windsor's parents divorced, and she was made to testify unwillingly against her father in court. Because custody of her had been awarded to her mother following the divorce, Windsor's father ceased all contact with Windsor, and would ignore her if he saw her in the street for many years afterwards.

== Career ==
Windsor made her film debut as an uncredited extra in 1954 playing a schoolgirl in The Belles of St. Trinians; she followed this with several other uncredited roles until she appeared in Too Hot to Handle (1960) with Jayne Mansfield. According to Windsor, Mansfield demanded that she appear at the back of the scene they shared, as she was worried Windsor's blonde hair and large chest would overshadow her own. After this, Windsor made her television debut when Johnny Brandon, with whom Windsor had starred in Love from Judy, asked her to appear in his television series Dreamer's Highway. Windsor later appeared in musical shows Variety Parade, The Jack Jackson Show, and Six-Five Special, regularly singing with bands. She then became a regular cabaret act at Ronnie Scott's Jazz Club in Soho, and went on to do the same at the Winston's club alongside Danny La Rue and Amanda Barrie.

After joining Joan Littlewood's Theatre Workshop at the Theatre Royal, Stratford East, she came to prominence in their 1959 stage production Fings Ain't Wot They Used T'Be and Littlewood's film Sparrows Can't Sing (1963), achieving a BAFTA nomination for Best British Film Actress. She also appeared in the comedy films Crooks in Cloisters (1964) and San Ferry Ann (1965), the thriller film A Study in Terror (1965), the fantasy film Chitty Chitty Bang Bang (1968) and Ken Russell's musical film The Boy Friend (1971), and the TV sitcoms The Rag Trade and Wild, Wild Women.

=== Carry On ===
Windsor came to prominence with her portrayals of a "good-time girl" in nine Carry On films. Her first was Carry On Spying in 1964 and her final one was Carry On Dick in 1974. She also appeared in several Carry On... television and compilation specials between 1964 and 1977.

One of her best known scenes was in Carry On Camping (1969), where her bikini top flew off during outdoor aerobic exercises. In typical Carry On style, exposure is implied, but little is, in fact, seen.

From 1973 to 1975, she appeared with several of the Carry On team in the West End revue Carry On London!.

She was strongly identified with the Carry On films for many years, which restricted the roles she was offered later in her career.

=== Theatre ===
Windsor starred on Broadway in the Theatre Workshop's Oh, What a Lovely War! and received a 1965 Tony Award nomination for Best Featured Actress in a Musical. She also appeared in several stage productions including Lionel Bart's musical flop Twang!! (1965) (directed by Joan Littlewood), The Beggar's Opera (1967), Come Spy with Me (1966–67) with Danny La Rue and in 30 pantomimes between 1950 and 2011.

In 1970, she landed the role of music hall legend Marie Lloyd in the musical-biopic Sing A Rude Song. In 1972, she appeared in the West End in Tony Richardson's The Threepenny Opera with Vanessa Redgrave. In 1975, she toured the UK, New Zealand, and South Africa in her own show, Carry On Barbara!, and followed this with the role of Maria in Twelfth Night at the Chichester Festival Theatre.

In 1981, she played sex-mad landlady Kath in Joe Orton's black comedy Entertaining Mr Sloane at the Lyric Hammersmith, directed by her friend Kenneth Williams. She reprised the role for a national tour with the National Theatre in 1993 co-starring John Challis of Only Fools and Horses fame.

=== EastEnders ===
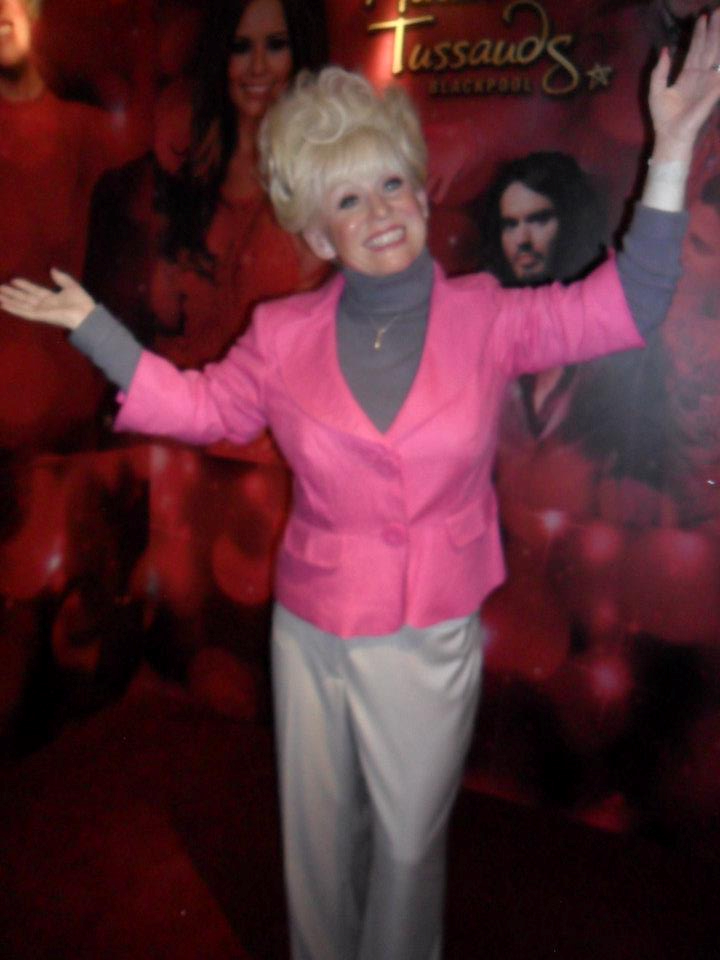
Waxwork of Windsor as Peggy Mitchell displayed in Blackpool

When EastEnders was launched in 1985, the producers said they would not cast well-known actors (although Wendy Richard was a rare exception). Windsor has said that she would have liked to have been part of the original cast. By 1994, this policy was relaxed, and Windsor accepted an offer to join EastEnders. She took over the role of Peggy Mitchell (who was previously a minor character played by Jo Warne in 1991). Peggy was the widowed mother of established key characters Phil (Steve McFadden) and Grant Mitchell (Ross Kemp), and younger sister Sam (Danniella Westbrook/Kim Medcalf). For this role, she received the Best Actress award at the 1999 British Soap Awards, and a Lifetime Achievement Award at the 2009 British Soap Awards.

A debilitating case of the Epstein–Barr virus forced a two-year absence from the role between 2003 and 2005, although Windsor was able to make a two-episode guest appearance in 2004. She rejoined the cast full-time in the summer of 2005. In October 2009, Windsor announced she was to leave her role as Peggy Mitchell, saying she wanted to spend more time with her husband. On 10 September 2010, her character left Albert Square after a fire destroyed the Queen Victoria pub, of which she was the owner.

In July 2013, it was announced that Windsor was to return for one episode, which aired on 20 September 2013. She again returned for a single episode on 25 September 2014, and made a further appearance for EastEnders 30th anniversary on 17 February 2015. In February 2015, Windsor, along with Pam St Clement (Pat Evans), took part in EastEnders: Back to Ours to celebrate 30 years of EastEnders. Windsor and St. Clement looked back on some of their characters' most dramatic moments.

In November 2015, Windsor secretly filmed a return to EastEnders, which was shown in January 2016. After this, the character was confirmed to be killed-off later in the year. This was Windsor's decision, as she said that she would always be open to a return to the show unless bosses decided to kill the character off. Her last appearance aired on BBC One on 17 May 2016. On 25 January 2022, by which time Windsor had died, an episode aired in which Peggy's son Phil hears his mother's voice giving him advice. The scene was made using archived audio from previous episodes.

== Later life ==
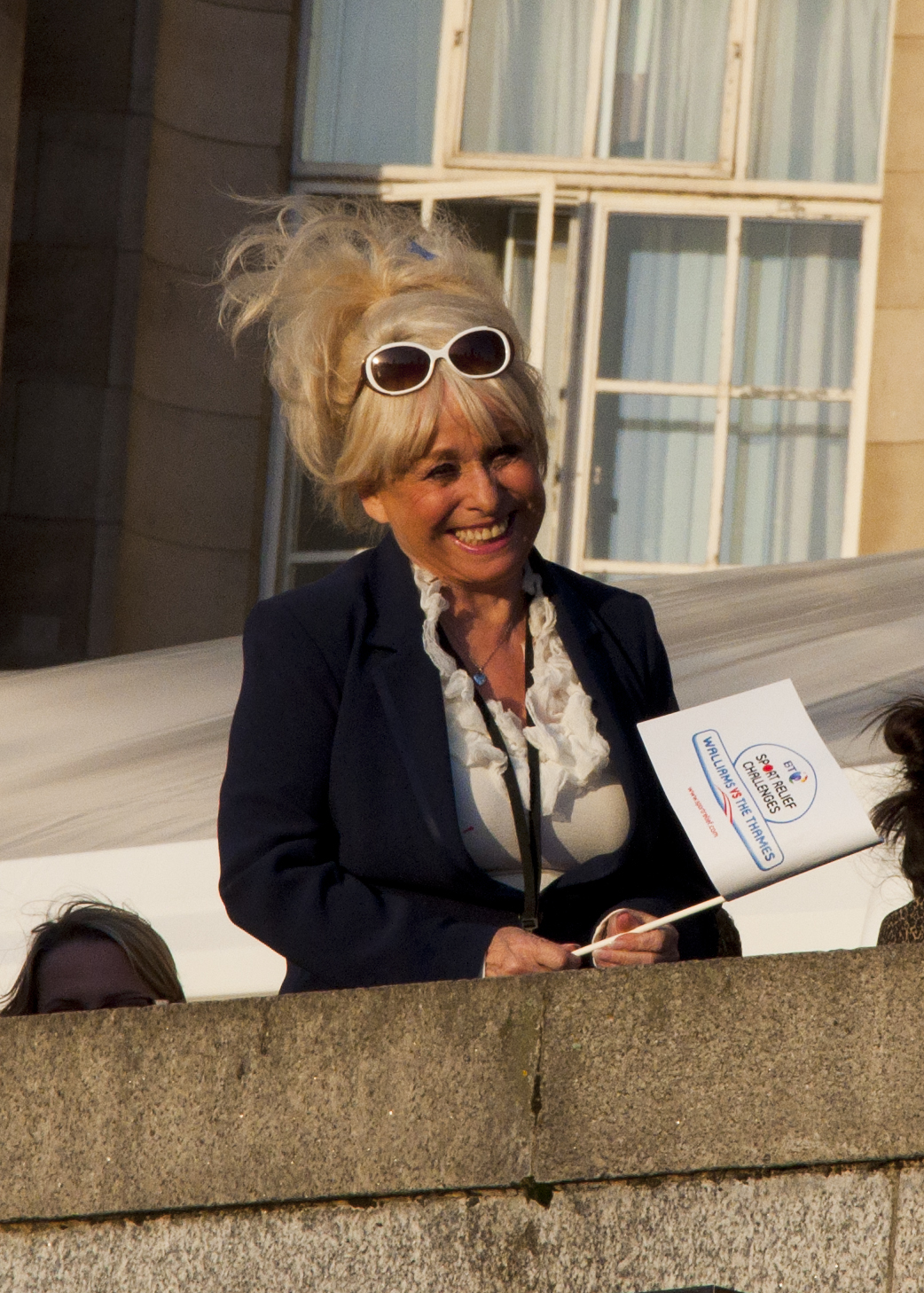
Windsor in 2011

Windsor hosted two series of the BBC documentary Disaster Masters in 2005. She provided the voice of the Dormouse in Walt Disney's live-action adaptation of Lewis Carroll's Alice in Wonderland (2010), directed by Tim Burton. Windsor starred in the pantomime Dick Whittington at the Bristol Hippodrome over the Christmas/New Year period of 2010/2011. In September 2010, it was announced that Windsor would be fronting a TV campaign for online bingo site Jackpotjoy as the Queen of Bingo. She appeared as herself in one episode of Come Fly with Me in January 2011.

From 2011 onwards, she regularly did presenting work for BBC Radio 2 music and showbusiness history programmes, and also was a regular stand in for Elaine Paige on Elaine Paige on Sunday. She reprised her voice role of the Dormouse in the film Alice Through the Looking Glass (2016).

In 2016, Windsor was invited to switch on the Blackpool Illuminations 57 years after her co-star in the film Too Hot to Handle, Jayne Mansfield, had performed the task during a break in filming.

In May 2017, Windsor appeared in a cameo role as herself in BBC Television's biopic about her life, Babs, written by EastEnders scriptwriter Tony Jordan. It showed Windsor in the 1990s as she prepared to go on stage, and recalled events from her life, including her childhood, marriage to gangster Ronnie Knight, and her roles in the Carry On films.

== Personal life ==
Windsor was married three times, and had no children. She was married to:

1. Ronnie Knight, (married 2 March 1964, divorced January 1985)
2. Stephen Hollings, chef/restaurateur (married 12 April 1986 in Jamaica, divorced 1995)
3. Scott Mitchell, former actor and recruitment consultant (married 8 April 2000)

Prior to her marriage to Knight, Windsor had a one-night stand with East End criminal Reggie Kray, and a longer relationship with his older brother Charlie Kray. During the time of making her later Carry On films, she had a well-publicised affair with her fellow actor and co-star Sid James, which lasted three years, until 1976. Windsor was initially uninterested in James, 24 years her senior, but later stated that she thought she would have sex with him once, and then he would leave her alone; however, James reportedly became obsessed with Windsor and suffocatingly possessive of her, to the extent that during the Carry On London! stage show, he shouted at Bernard Bresslaw because he had helped Windsor off the stage, the only reason being that Bresslaw had touched Windsor.

James, who, like Windsor, was also already married, would send her a dozen red roses with a note attached with the words "Love Romeo", and even arranged to see her in Australia during her Carry On Barbara one-woman show, as he could not bear to be without her. He would also state his love for her in public and to Windsor's friends. After the relationship took its toll on her, Windsor ended it. Devastated by her decision, James became depressed and started to drink whisky; he died soon afterwards from a heart attack.

Another of Windsor's Carry On co-stars, Kenneth Williams, accompanied Windsor and Knight on their honeymoon, also bringing his mother and sister with him.

Windsor also dated Gary Crosby in the 1960s and had brief sexual encounters with Victor Mature, Anthony Newley, Ronnie Scott, James Booth, George Best and Maurice Gibb, the latter two while she was still married. In the late 1950s, Windsor became engaged to singer Cliff Lawrence, but he physically beat her. In her autobiography, All of Me, Windsor stated that she often turned up at Winston's, the club where she sang, with a black eye, and detailed one occasion when Lawrence dragged her down the street by her hair. Windsor ended the relationship, and then started dating Knight. Windsor said that Lawrence would spy on her and Knight from telephone boxes, only leaving them alone after Knight threatened him.

In her autobiography, Windsor discussed her five abortions: three in her 20s, and the last at the age of 42. She said that she never wanted children as a result of her father rejecting her after her parents' divorce.

Windsor was best friends with fellow actress Anna Karen, whom she met while filming Carry On Camping and who later went on to play Peggy Mitchell's sister Aunt Sal in EastEnders on and off for 20 years.

Windsor was friends with Amy Winehouse, and in 2012 became a patron of the Amy Winehouse Foundation. In 2014, Windsor unveiled a statue of Winehouse in Camden Market.

Since July 2023, her widower, has been in a relationship with her EastEnders co-star Tanya Franks, who played Rainie Cross.

=== Health problems ===
In April 2014, Windsor was diagnosed with Alzheimer's disease. She chose not to make news of the condition public, but it was known to her friends and colleagues. On 10 May 2018, Windsor's husband, Scott Mitchell, publicly revealed her condition. In January 2019, Mitchell and some of Windsor's former co-stars from EastEnders announced that they would be running the London Marathon in aid of a dementia campaign. Mitchell said that Windsor's health and mental state had been deteriorating, and she had moments when she no longer recognised him.

On Windsor's 82nd birthday in August 2019, she and Mitchell became ambassadors for the Alzheimer's Society. On the same day, Mitchell and Windsor appeared in a video for the charity, in which Windsor said, "Unite with me, against dementia". Mitchell highlighted the problems many face with the disease, and urged viewers to sign a letter to Prime Minister Boris Johnson, saying he "urgently needs to address these challenges." In August 2020, BBC News reported that Windsor had been moved into a care home in London.

== Death ==
Windsor died at Anita Dorfman House, a Jewish Care home in Stanmore, North West London, on 10 December 2020, aged 83.

The next episode of EastEnders, broadcast on 11 December 2020, was dedicated to Windsor's memory. As well as this, the 2017 biopic Babs, which documented Windsor's life, was also broadcast. Among those who paid tributes to her were her EastEnders co-stars, entertainers, politicians including Prime Minister Boris Johnson, former Prime Minister David Cameron, Leader of the Opposition Keir Starmer and members of the Royal family, Prince William, Duke of Cambridge – who described Windsor as "a true national treasure ... a giant of the entertainment world" – and Charles, Prince of Wales with his wife Camilla, Duchess of Cornwall.

Windsor's funeral took place on 8 January 2021. Her body was cremated at Golders Green Crematorium. The service was attended by Anna Karen, Christopher Biggins, Ross Kemp, David Walliams and Matt Lucas, amongst others, although numbers were limited due to the COVID-19 pandemic. Floral decorations on Windsor's coffin spelled out the words "The Dame", "Saucy" (Windsor's catchphrase in the Carry On films) and "The Queen Peggy". Windsor's funeral programme featured the famous photo of her in Carry On Camping, a photo that she joked "will follow me right to the end".

== In popular culture ==
Windsor was played by Samantha Spiro in Terry Johnson's play Cleo, Camping, Emmanuelle and Dick, which premiered at the National Theatre in 1998. Rachel Clarke took over the role of Windsor in the touring production of the play in 2001. Spiro reprised the role in the subsequent TV film adaptation, Cor, Blimey! (2000). The latter also featured a cameo appearance from Windsor, playing herself.

In the 2006 BBC television film Kenneth Williams: Fantabulosa!, Windsor was again played by Rachel Clarke. Spiro reprised her role as Windsor in the TV biopic Babs in 2017, with Jaime Winstone and Honor Kneafsey playing younger versions of Windsor.

== Honours ==
Windsor was appointed Member of the Order of the British Empire (MBE) in the 2000 New Year Honours, and in the same year she was the first person to be inducted into the newly created BBC Hall of Fame. In August 2010 she was given the Freedom of the City of London, and in November 2010 she was honoured by the City of Westminster at a tree-planting and plaque ceremony.

She was inducted into the Hackney Empire Walk of Fame on 25 May 2017.

Windsor was appointed Dame Commander of the Order of the British Empire (DBE) in the 2016 New Year Honours for services to charity and entertainment.

In November 2014, she was awarded an honorary doctorate from the University of East London.

=== Commonwealth honours ===
Country	Date	Appointment	Post-nominal letters
United Kingdom	2000–2016	Member of Order of the British Empire (Civil Division)	MBE
United Kingdom	2016–10 December 2020	Dame Commander of Order of the British Empire (Civil Division)	DBE

=== Scholastic ===
Chancellor, visitor, governor, rector and fellowships

Location	Date	School	Position
England	2015–10 December 2020	Royal Central School of Speech and Drama	Honorary Fellow

=== Honorary degrees ===
Location	Date	School	Degree	Gave Commencement Address
England	20 November 2014	University of East London	Doctor of Arts (D.Arts)	Yes

=== Freedom of the City ===
- (England) 4 August 2010: London.

== Filmography ==
=== Film ===
Year	Title	Role	Notes	Ref.
1954	The Belles of St Trinian's	Schoolgirl	Uncredited	
1956	Lost	Young Girl in Chemist	Uncredited	
1959	Make Mine a Million	Switchboard Operator	Uncredited	
1960	Too Hot to Handle	Ponytail		
1961	Flame in the Streets	Girlfriend	Uncredited	
1961	On the Fiddle	Mavis		
1962	Hair of the Dog	Elsie Grumble		
1962	Death Trap	Babs Newton		
1963	Sparrows Can't Sing	Maggie		
1964	Carry On Spying	Daphne Honeybutt		
1964	Crooks in Cloisters	Bikini		
1965	San Ferry Ann	Hiker Girl		
1965	A Study in Terror	Annie Chapman		
1967	Carry On Doctor	Nurse Sandra May		
1968	Chitty Chitty Bang Bang	Blonde		
1969	Carry On Camping	Babs		
1969	Carry On Again Doctor	Goldie Locks		
1971	Carry On Henry	Bettina		
1971	The Boy Friend	Hortense		
1972	Carry On Matron	Nurse Susan Ball		
1972	Carry On Abroad	Sadie Tomkins		
1973	Not Now, Darling	Sue Lawson		
1973	Carry On Girls	Hope Springs		
1974	Carry On Dick	Harriet		
1977	That's Carry On!	Barbara Windsor		
1986	Comrades	Mrs Wetham		
1987	It Couldn't Happen Here	Seaside landlady / Neil's mother		
1994	Pussy in Boots	Wandawoman		
2001	Second Star To The Left	Babs	Voice	
2010	Alice in Wonderland	Mallymkun	Voice	
2016	Alice Through the Looking Glass	Mallymkun	Voice	

=== Television ===
Years	Title	Role	Notes	Ref.
1954–1955	Dreamer's Highway	Unknown	2 episodes	
1961–1963	The Rag Trade	Gloria	15 episodes	
1962	The Edgar Wallace Mystery Theatre	Babs Newton	Episode: "Death Trap"	
1962	A Christmas Night with the Stars	Gloria	The Rag Trade segment	
1963	The Plane Makers	Marlene	Episode: "Any More for the Skylark?"	
1963	The Rag Trade	Judy	8 episodes	
1964	Comedy Playhouse	Cynthia Spooner	Episode: "The Hen House"	
1964	Two Plus Two	Louella	Episode: "A Funny Thing Happened To Me on My Way To the Altar"	
1965	The Des O'Connor Show	Nurse	Episode: #2.1	
1967	Before the Fringe	Various	2 episodes	
1968	Dad's Army	Laura la Plaz	Episode: "Shooting Pains"	
1968	Ooh La La!	Chiquette/Giboulette	2 episodes	
1968–1969	Wild, Wild Women	Millie	All 7 episodes	
1969	The Rolf Harris Show	Maid Marion	Episode #3.12	
1969	Carry On Christmas	Various	TV film	
1970	Comedy Playhouse	Polly	Episode: "Meter Maids"	
1970	Up Pompeii!	Nymphia	Episode: "Guess Who's Coming to Sin'Er Nymphia"	
1970	Carry On Christmas	Jim Hawkins	Christmas Special	
1972	Carry On Christmas	Various	Christmas Special	
1973	Ooh La La!	The Shrimp	Episode: "The Lady from Maxims"	
1973	The Bob Monkhouse Offensive	Stripper	TV film	
1973	Carry On Christmas	Various	Christmas Special	
1973	The Punch Review	Various	Episode: #1.3	
1973	Whodunnit?	Panelist	TV Game Show	
1975	Carry On Laughing	Vera Basket	Episode: "The Prisoner of Spenda"	
1975	Carry On Laughing	Marie	Episode: "The Baron Outlook"	
1975	Carry On Laughing	Sarah	Episode: "The Sobbing Cavalier"	
1975	Carry On Laughing	Lady Miranda	Episode: "Orgy and Bess"	
1975	Carry On Laughing	Maisie	Episode: "The Nine Old Cobblers"	
1975	Carry On Laughing	Lottie	Episode: "Who Needs Kitchener?"	
1975	Carry On Laughing	Lady Mary	Episode: "Lamp-Posts of the Empire"	
1976	The Mike Reid Show	Various	Episode: #1.0	
1980	Both Ends Meet	Doris White	TV pilot	
1980	Worzel Gummidge	Saucy Nancy	4 episodes	
1983	Carry On Laughing's Christmas Classics	Barbara Windsor	TV film	
1987	Filthy Rich & Catflap	Mum	Episode #1.1	
1987	Super Gran	Ethel	Episode: "Supergran and the Heir Apparent"	
1987	The Grand Knockout Tournament	Lady Knock of Alton	Television special	
1988	The Nephew	Aunty Vicky	3 episodes	
1988	Terry in Pantoland	Various	TV film	
1989	Norbert Smith: A Life	Greenham Women's Leader	TV film	
1989	Bluebirds	Mabel Fletcher	6 episodes	
1990	Family Fortunes	Fairy	Episode: "Celebrity Christmas Special 2"	
1991	You Rang, M'Lord?	Myrtle	2 episodes	
1992	Double Vision	Snow Queen Boss	TV film	
1993	Frank Stubbs	Barbara Windsor	Episode: "Starlet"	
1993	The Great Bong	Mabel	Voice	
1994–2010; 2013–2016	EastEnders	Peggy Mitchell	Series regular, 1,671 episodes	
1995	One Foot in the Grave	Millicent	Episode: "The Affair of the Hollow Lady"	
1999	The Nearly Complete and Utter History of Everything	Highwayman Robbery Victim	TV film	
2000	Cor, Blimey!	Barbara Windsor	TV film	
2001	Second Star to the Left	Babs	Voice	
2006	Doctor Who	Peggy Mitchell	Episode: "Army of Ghosts"	
2006	Who Do You Think You Are?	Herself	Episode: "Barbara Windsor"	
2009	Walk on the Wild Side	Mouse	Voice; Episode: #1.3	
2011	Little Crackers	Shop Assistant	Episode: "My First Brassiere"	
2011	Come Fly With Me	Barbara Windsor	Episode: #1.4	
2015	Children in Need	Barbara Windsor	Star Wars sketch	
2016	The Tube: Going Underground	Herself	Documentary	
2017	Babs	Herself	TV film	

== Stage credits ==
Windsor later spoke positively about her early stage career, particularly her time with Joan Littlewood’s Theatre Workshop, which she regarded as formative. Reflecting on the experience, she said that the company’s rigorous and improvisational methods helped her become “more in touch with her real self” as a performer, an approach she felt informed her later work across stage, film and television. Critics have noted that her stage work demonstrated a discipline and theatrical grounding that underpinned her later popular success, with one assessment describing her as a “mischievous and instinctive stage performer” whose early theatre training gave depth to her comic screen persona.

Year	Production	Role	Venue / Company	Ref
1950	Cinderella		Golders Green Hippodrome	
1952–1954	Love from Judy	Sadie Kate	Saville Theatre, London	
1955	Many Happy Returns		Watergate Theatre, London	
1955–1956	Red Riding Hood		Shakespeare Theatre, Liverpool	
1958	Keep Your Hair On	Marlene	Apollo Theatre, London	
1958	The Gimmick	Gabby Burton	UK Tour	
1959–1962	Fings Ain't Wot They Used T'Be	Rosie	Theatre Royal Stratford East / Garrick Theatre, London	
1964	Oh, What a Lovely War!	Pierrot	Broadhurst Theatre, New York City	
1965	Twang!!	Delphina	Shaftesbury Theatre, London	
1966–1967	Come Spy with Me	Mavis Apple	Whitehall Theatre, London	
1967	The Beggar's Opera	Alice Eagerly; Lucy Lockit	Connaught Theatre, Worthing	
1968	The Wind in the Sassafras Trees	Virginia	Belgrade Theatre, Coventry	
1970	Sing a Rude Song	Marie Lloyd	Greenwich Theatre / Garrick Theatre, London	
1970–1971	Cinderella		Theatre Royal, Norwich	
1971–1972	Cinderella	Sister	Royal Court Theatre, Liverpool	
1972	The Threepenny Opera	Lucy Brown	Prince of Wales Theatre / Piccadilly Theatre, London	
1972	The Owl and the Pussycat	Doris	UK Tour	
1972–1973	Cinderella		Odeon Theatre, Golders Green	
1973–1974	Carry On London!	Various	Birmingham Hippodrome / Victoria Palace Theatre, London	
1975	Carry On Barbara / A Merry Whiff of Windsor	Various	New Zealand, UK, South Africa Tours	
1975–1976	Aladdin	Aladdin	Richmond Theatre	
1976	Twelfth Night	Maria	Chichester Festival Theatre	
1976–1977	Aladdin	Aladdin	Alhambra Theatre, Bradford	
1977–1978	Aladdin	Aladdin	Alexandra Theatre, Birmingham	
1978–1979	Dick Whittington	Dick Whittington	Ashcroft Theatre, Croydon	
1979	Calamity Jane	Calamity Jane	UK Tour	
1979–1980	Dick Whittington	Dick Whittington	Richmond Theatre	
1980–1981	Jack and the Beanstalk	Jack	Theatre Royal, Newcastle upon Tyne	
1981	Entertaining Mr Sloane	Kath	Lyric Theatre, Hammersmith	
1981	The Mating Game	Julia	Grand Theatre, Blackpool	
1981–1982	Aladdin	Aladdin	Theatre Royal, Nottingham	
1982	The Mating Game	Julia	UK Tour	
1982–1983	Aladdin	Aladdin	New Theatre, Oxford	
1983	The Mating Game	Julia	Floral Hall, Scarborough	
1983–1984	Aladdin	Aladdin	Festival Theatre, Chichester	
1984	The Mating Game	Julia	Jersey Opera House	
1984–1985	Dick Whittington	Dick Whittington	Orchard Theatre, Dartford	
1985	What A Carry On At Butlins	Various	Butlins Holiday Camps	
1985–1986	Aladdin	Aladdin	Theatre Royal, Nottingham	
1986–1987	Dick Whittington		Beck Theatre, Hayes	
1987–1988	Babes in the Wood	The Fairy	London Palladium	
1988	Guys and Dolls	Miss Adelaide	UK Tour	
1988–1989	Babes in the Wood	The Fairy	Churchill Theatre, Bromley	
1989	The Mating Game	Julia	Pier Theatre, Bournemouth	
1989–1990	Cinderella	Fairy Godmother	Gordon Craig Theatre, Stevenage	
1990–1991	Cinderella	Fairy Godmother	Wimbledon Theatre, London	
1991	Guys and Dolls	Miss Adelaide	UK Tour	
1991–1992	Aladdin	Aladdin	Derngate Theatre, Northampton	
1992	Wot a Carry on in Blackpool!	Various	North Pier Theatre, Blackpool	
1992–1993	Cinderella	Fairy Godmother	Theatre Royal, Brighton	
1993	Entertaining Mr Sloane	Kath	UK Tour	
1993–1994	Aladdin	Aladdin	Gordon Craig Theatre, Stevenage	
1994–1995	Aladdin	Fairy Godmother	The Anvil, Basingstoke	
1995–1996	Cinderella	Fairy Godmother	Orchard Theatre, Dartford	
2010–2011	Dick Whittington	Fairy Bowbells	Bristol Hippodrome	

Acting roles
First actress	Saucy Nancy actress from Worzel Gummidge; 1980	Succeeded by Shirley Henderson
Preceded by Jo Warne	Peggy Mitchell actress 1994–2010; 2013–'16	Succeeded by Jaime Winstone
