= Ronnie Knight =

British gangster (1934–2023)

- Born: Ronald Knight; 20 January 1934; Hoxton, London, England
- Died: 12 June 2023 (aged 89); Cambridge, Cambridgeshire, England
- Occupation: Nightclub owner
- Years active: 1970–1995 (criminal); 2002–2003 (television)
- Known for: Connection to 1983 Security Express robbery
- Spouses: Elizabeth White (m. 1954, divorced) Barbara Windsor (m. 1964; div. 1985) Sue Haylock (m. 1987; sep. 1994)
- Children: 2
- Status: Released on parole in November 1998 after serving three years
- Motive: Financial
- Criminal charges: Handling stolen money
- Penalty: 7 years

Ronald Knight (20 January 1934 – 12 June 2023) was an English convicted criminal and nightclub owner. He became well-known through his marriage to actress Barbara Windsor.

On 4 January 1995, Knight was sentenced to seven years imprisonment for handling £314,813 in stolen money from the 1983 £6 million armed robbery at a Security Express depot in Shoreditch, East London.

== Early life ==
Ronald Knight was born on 20 January 1934 in Hoxton area of the Metropolitan Borough of Shoreditch, the son of James and Nellie.

Knight was responsible for minor infractions of the law when he was young, whereas his brothers John and James were involved in more significant crimes. Along with brother John, Ronnie Knight was friendly with the Kray brothers, but, he says, was not connected with their illegal activities. Knight also had another brother, David and a sister, Patsy.

== Clubs ==
The two clubs Knight ran, the Artistes and Repertoire Club (known as the A&R) on Charing Cross Road and its neighbour Tin Pan Alley in Soho, London, were drinking establishments favoured by the criminal underworld.

Knight's clubs were profitable, and he had a sideline in pool tables. He also made a small fortune from his share in peep-show clubs.

== Criminal history ==
=== Zomparelli killing ===
In 1970, Knight's brother, David, was stabbed to death in a pub in Islington by Alfredo "Italian Tony" Zomparelli aka "Tony Z". Tony ran a travel agency in Soho and used to extort money from the owner of the A & M Casino, above the White Elephant Restaurant in Grosvenor Square, Mayfair, by threatening the staff. Tony died from bullet wounds to his back in the Golden Goose Arcade, Soho, in September 1974 a few weeks after being released following a prison sentence for manslaughter. Zomparelli had pleaded self-defence.

After hitman George Bradshaw confessed to his involvement, and alleged Knight had paid him £1,000 for the task, Knight was arrested for the murder of Zomparelli and tried at the Old Bailey in 1980; Knight was acquitted.

In his 1998 book, Memoirs and Confessions, Knight said he had hired a hitman, Nicky Gerard, to carry out the killing. Gerard, who himself was later murdered, was acquitted at the same trial as Knight. The killing was in revenge for the murder of Knight's brother. Under the double jeopardy rules in force at the time, it meant he could not be tried a second time.

In 2002, Knight again denied responsibility.

=== Connection to 1983 Security Express robbery ===
Knight spent a decade on the run living in southern Spain's Costa del Sol, after fleeing on the night his brother was arrested in 1984 for a robbery at a Security Express depot the previous year. John Knight was later imprisoned for 22 years in June 1985 for co-arranging the robbery. Their other surviving brother James was among the other gang members along with Freddie Foreman, John Mason, Ronnie Everett and Cliford Saxe and received eight years for handling stolen money.

While evading extradition in Spain, Knight ran an Indian restaurant named Mumtaz and an eponymous nightclub, RKnights, the scene of violent crimes including a physical attack upon Knight, but by the mid-1990s, he was in financial difficulties.

After returning to Britain in May 1994, Knight, aged 60, was jailed for seven years in January 1995 for handling £314,813 in stolen money from the £6 million armed robbery at a Security Express depot in Shoreditch, East London in 1983. Knight said he was not involved in the robbery, and the prosecution counsel Michael Worsley QC agreed the charge should remain on file, but Knight did plead guilty to handling the stolen bank notes. Judge Gerald Gordon said when sentencing Knight: "Clearly, I do not know what precise role you played, but professional robbers such as those involved are not going to hand over the sort of sums you got unless the person to whom they give it is very deeply involved himself".

In November 1998, Knight was released on parole after serving three years.

=== Other crimes ===
In 1961, Knight was sentenced to 15 months in prison for dealing in stolen goods.

== Television ==
Year	Title
2002	Five Tons of Cash: The John and Ronnie Knight Story
2002	Real Crime
2003	Hitler of the Andes

In 2017, Knight was portrayed by Luke Allen-Gale in the BBC biopic documentary Babs.

== Personal life ==
Knight was married three times and had two children.

1. Elizabeth White (married in 1954, divorced before 1964)
2. Barbara Windsor, actor (married 2 March 1964 in London, divorced January 1985)
3. Sue Haylock (married in 1987 in Fuengirola, separated in 1994)

Knight had two children from his marriage to White, a daughter Lorraine (1956) and a son Garry (1959). In 1995, it was reported Knight was in a relationship with (?) They split around 2002.

Knight always denied he was a "gangster", preferring instead the term "loveable rascal". Knight lived in Cambridge during the later years of his life. He died from pneumonia on 12 June 2023 at the age of 89 after battling Parkinson's disease.

== Selected publications ==
Knight authored six books.

1. Black Knight: The Ronnie Knight Story (1990)
2. Signed Confessions (1996)
3. Rod of Justice (1997)
4. Memoirs and Confessions (1997)
5. Gotcha!: The Untold Story of Britain's Biggest Cash Robbery (2002)
6. Blood and Revenge (2004)
