= Illyria (musical) =

- Official cover art
- Music: Peter Mills
- Lyrics: Peter Mills
- Book: Peter Mills
- Basis: William Shakespeare's Twelfth Night
- Premiere: Hudson Guild Theater, New York City
- Productions: 2002 & 2008 Off-Broadway, New York City; 2004 Shakespeare Theatre of New Jersey, New Jersey; 2008 Texas Repertory Theatre, Texas; 2011 Pittsburgh Playhouse, Pittsburgh

Illyria is a musical with book, music, and lyrics by Peter Mills, based on William Shakespeare's Twelfth Night, written in 2002. Illyria is a traditional adaptation of Twelfth Night, but features a more contemporary score.

Illyria began as Prospect Theater Company's musical production of Twelfth Night in Central Park in 2001. The company's artistic director Cara Reichel and resident writer Pete Mills then collaborated to create a complete musical adaptation. The musical premiered from April 12 through the 28th at the Hudson Guild Theater, New York City.

== Plot ==
=== Act I ===
Feste, a jester, welcomes the audience and introduces them to the world of Illyria and each character featured in the show (“Illyria”). In the midst of his introductions, an intense thunderstorm shipwrecks the twins Viola and Sebastian off of Illyria's coast. Viola is able to make it to shore, but is unable to find her brother, and assumes he is dead. She decides to take on his identity, reasoning that it would be safer to be a man in an unfamiliar place ("Sebastian").

Dressed as Sebastian, Viola finds work as a servant for Orsino, a Duke who is in love with the Countess Olivia. Orsino sends Viola to ask for Olivia's hand, but Viola soon realizes she has feelings for Orsino ("How These Things Start").

Meanwhile, Feste returns to Olivia's home after spending several years away. He is surprised that Olivia is still mourning for her brother (and Feste's former master), and takes it upon himself to bring joy back into the household. He lightheartedly mocks Maria about her love for Sir Toby, and brings back an old rivalry with the steward Malvolio ("Silly Little Syllogisms"). Feste's efforts to cheer up Olivia work, and she agrees to receive a visitor, Viola ("Olivia"). The Countess is quite taken with her, and as Viola leaves to report back to Orsino, Malvolio gives her a gift from Olivia, a ring ("The Ring").

It is revealed that Sebastian has survived the shipwreck, and he enters Illyria with Antonio, the man who rescued him ("Crossovers").

At Olivia's house, Feste, Toby, Maria, and Olivia's suitor Andrew are all annoyed with Malvolio after he gets them in trouble ("Cakes and Ale"). The four work together to create a plan for revenge ("The Man is Mine").

At the Duke's palace, Viola and Orsino have a conversation on love. Viola realizes how much she cares for him, but knows she must wait until she can safely reveal her true identity before the two can be together (“Patience”). However, the next morning Orsino discovers the ring that Olivia gifted Viola, and he yet again sends Viola to her home ("We Men").

Meanwhile, the revenge plan is set in motion as Maria writes a “secret admirer” letter to Malvolio, written to seem as though Olivia sent it. The letter tells Malvolio to dress and act in a ridiculous way in order to prove he loves Olivia back (“The Love Letter”).

Viola, yet again with Olivia, realizes that the Countess has fallen in love with her instead of Orsino ("Undone"). The act closes as Viola, Olivia, and Orsino worry about their seemingly hopeless situations (“Save One”).

=== Act II ===
The second act begins with Maria's revenge plan working: Malvolio clumsily flirts with Olivia while dressed in ridiculous yellow socks (“Malvolio’s Tango”). Olivia assumes he has gone mad, and has Sir Toby take him away.

The real Sebastian makes it to the Duke's palace, and the Duke, assuming that he is Viola, declares his love ("Whoever You Are"). Sebastian panics and flees to Olivia's house, where he is once again mistaken for Viola. Sebastian and Viola end up in an absurd duel with Sir Andrew, which was set up by Maria and Toby (“The Duel”). Olivia rescues Sebastian from the duel and professes her love. Sebastian is confused but accepts ("The Lady Must Be Mad").

Malvolio, now imprisoned, begs Feste to release him or at least deliver a message to the Countess ("The Lunatic"). Eventually, through a wild musical sequence, Sebastian and Viola are reunited and all the misunderstandings are resolved. Orsino and Viola are together, Olivia and Sebastian are together, and Toby and Maria reunite as well. Feste and the full cast address the audience and say goodbye (“Finale”).

== Music ==
The score of Illyria is contemporary musical theater, drawing in elements of classic Broadway shows and comic light opera.

Musical Numbers

- 1. Prologue - Feste and Company
- 1a. Sebastian - Viola
- 2. How These Things Start - Orsino and Viola
- 3. Silly Little Syllogisms - Feste and Olivia
- 4. Olivia - Viola and Olivia
- 5. Crossovers - Sebastian and Viola
- 5a. The Ring - Viola
- 6. Cakes And Ale - Toby, Andrew, Feste, and Maria
- 7. Patience - Viola
- 8. The Man Is Mine - Maria, Toby, Andrew, and Feste
- 9. We Men - Orsino and Viola
- 10. The Love Letter - Malvolio and Olivia
- 11. Undone - Olivia and Viola
- 12. Save One - Viola, Olivia, and Orsino
- 13. Malvolio's Tango - Malvolio
- 14. Whoever You Are - Orsino
- 15. The Duel - Toby, Andrew, Maria, Viola, Antonio, Sebastian, and Olivia
- 16. The Lunatic - Feste and Malvolio
- 17. The Lady Must Be Mad - Sebastian
- 18. Finale - Company

== Characters and original casts ==
- Viola, Sebastian's passionate and spunky twin sister who takes on his identity
- Sebastian, Viola's naïve and optimistic twin brother
- Duke Orsino, Illyria's ruler who is in love with Olivia
- Olivia, a beautiful noblewoman of Illyria
- Malvolio, Olivia's full-of-himself steward
- Sir Toby, Olivia's lazy uncle who is in love with Maria
- Maria, Olivia's confidante and maid
- Sir Andrew Aguecheek, Olivia's comedic suitor
- Feste, a clever jester who also serves as the musical's narrator
- Antonio, a sailor who rescues Sebastian
- Guards/Courtiers, in the service of Duke Orsino, who see to his every whim and protect his dukedom
- Ladies in Waiting, to Olivia, in her household and under the instruction of Maria

Character	Off-Broadway (2002)	New Jersey (2004)	Off-Broadway Revival (2008)
Viola	Kate Bradner	Elena Shaddow	Jessica Grové
Duke Orsino	Rich Affannato	Steve Wilson	Brandon Andrus
Lady Olivia	Kate MacKenzie	Maria Couch	Laura Shoop
Sebastian	Courter Simmons	Chris Peluso	Mitch Dean
Malvolio	Ames Adamson	Ames Adamson	Jimmy Ray Bennett
Sir Toby Belch	Leon Land Gersing	T. Doyle Leverett	Dan Sharkey
Maria	Sarah Corey	Kristie Dale Sanders	Tina Stafford
Sir Andrew Aguecheek	Jason Mills	Benjamin Eakeley	Ryan Dietz
Feste	Arik Luck	Joel Blum	Jim Poulos
Antonio	Matthew Alexander	Darren Matthias	Andrew Miramontes
