= Twelfth Night (1986 film) =

1987 Australian film by Neil Armfield

- Directed by: Neil Armfield
- Based on: Twelfth Night by William Shakespeare
- Starring: Gillian Jones; Ivar Kants; Peter Cummins
- Release date: 1986
- Country: Australia
- Language: English
- Budget: A$590,000
- Box office: A$201,302 (Australia)

Twelfth Night is a 1986 Australian film based on the play directed by Neil Armfield and starring Gillian Jones, Ivar Kants, and Peter Cummins.

== Cast ==
- Gillian Jones as Viola and Sebastian
- Ivar Kants as Orsino
- Jacquy Phillips as Countess Olivia
- Peter Cummins as Malvolio
- Kerry Walker as Feste
- Geoffrey Rush as Sir Andrew Aguecheek
- John Wood as Sir Toby Belch
- Tracy Harvey as Maria
- Russell Kiefel as Sea Captain
- Tyler Coppin as Party Guest
- Nikki Coghill as Party Guest
- Alan David Lee as Messenger

== Production ==
Neil Armfield had directed a stage production for the Lighthouse Company, the State Theatre of South Australia. Several of the cast from that production reprised their roles, including Jacquy Phillips, Peter Cummins, John Wood and Geoffrey Rush; Ivar Kants and Tracey Harvey were new additions. Shooting began at the Balmain Bijou Theatre on 5 August 1985.
