= She's the Man =

2006 romantic comedy sports film by Andy Fickman

- Theatrical release poster
- Directed by: Andy Fickman
- Screenplay by: Ewan Leslie; Karen McCullah Lutz; Kirsten Smith
- Story by: Ewan Leslie
- Based on: Twelfth Night by William Shakespeare
- Produced by: Lauren Shuler Donner; Tom Rosenberg; Gary Lucchesi
- Starring: Amanda Bynes; Channing Tatum; Laura Ramsey; Vinnie Jones; Robert Hoffman; Alex Breckenridge; Julie Hagerty; David Cross
- Cinematography: Greg Gardiner
- Edited by: Michael Jablow
- Music by: Nathan Wang
- Production companies: DreamWorks Pictures; Lakeshore Entertainment; The Donners' Company
- Distributed by: DreamWorks Distribution, LLC; Paramount Pictures (United States); Lakeshore Entertainment (Overseas)
- Release date: March 17, 2006
- Running time: 105 minutes
- Country: United States
- Language: English
- Budget: $20–25 million
- Box office: $57.2 million

She's the Man is a 2006 American romantic comedy teen sports film directed by Andy Fickman and starring Amanda Bynes, Channing Tatum, Laura Ramsey, Vinnie Jones, and David Cross. Inspired by William Shakespeare's play Twelfth Night, the film centers on teenager Viola Hastings, who enrolls at her brother's new boarding school, Illyria Prep, in his place and pretends to be a boy in order to play on the boys' soccer team.

She's the Man emerged as a moderate commercial success, grossing $57.2 million against a budget of $20–25 million. The film received mixed reviews from critics, but Bynes's performance was universally praised and developed a cult following.

== Plot ==
Viola Hastings is a teen girl who plays for the girls' soccer team with her two best friends, Kia and Yvonne, at her high school, Cornwall Prep. Her dream is to play for the North Carolina Tar Heels. When they discover their high school cut their girls' soccer team, Viola, Kia and Yvonne try to join the boys' team, but their coach, Coach Pistonek, refuses. Viola's boyfriend, Justin, supports Pistonek's decision not to let girls play on his team, despite having said that Viola is better than half of his team the day before, upsetting Viola, and resulting in the pair breaking up.

Just as Viola gets to her house, her twin brother Sebastian’s girlfriend, Monique Valentine, follows her, initially mistaking her for Sebastian, and tells her to tell Sebastian to contact her if he wants to stay in her life. When Viola enters her house, she is greeted by her mother, Daphne, who wants Viola to debut at the upcoming debutante ball, and who is divorced from Roger, Viola’s father. Sebastian has to enroll in Illyria, an elite boarding school, as he was recently expelled from Cornwall for skipping classes, but he secretly goes to London with his fledgling band instead. Sebastian is also struggling with his relationship with Monique.

Viola agrees to cover for Sebastian by tricking Daphne into thinking that he is staying at Roger's house. Viola decides to pass herself off as Sebastian, hoping to join Illyria's boy's soccer team and beat Cornwall to prove Coach Pistonek and Justin wrong for suggesting she isn't good enough to play on the Cornwall boy's team. With the help of her stylist friend, Paul, she is transformed into "Sebastian" and attends Illyria in his place. While moving in, she meets her roommate, Duke Orsino, Illyria's attractive soccer team captain, and his friends, Toby and Andrew. During tryouts, Viola fails to impress Coach Dinklage and is assigned to second string, much to her dismay. Duke, Toby, Andrew, and the other players initially dislike "Sebastian," as he is awkward and strange. However, after Paul stages an elaborate scene at the local pizzeria, Cesario's, with Kia and Yvonne (meant to portray "Sebastian" as an attractive guy) and “Sebastian” breaks up with Monique, they begin to accept him into their social circle. As they grow closer, Duke and his friends also reveal that Duke has had a crush on Olivia Lennox for the past few years, and that she has recently gone through a messy breakup. They also briefly introduce Malcolm, another student at Illyria who has a near-obsessive crush on Olivia.

"Sebastian" gets assigned Olivia as his lab partner, which frustrates Duke, who ends up being partnered with Eunice Bates, a stereotypically nerdy and unattractive girl. "Sebastian" agrees to put in a good word for Duke if Duke, in turn, trains him to be a better soccer player. However, Olivia starts to develop feelings for "Sebastian" instead. This also makes Malcolm suspicious, and he starts to investigate "Sebastian". Eventually, Coach Dinklage notices "Sebastian's" effort and improvement and promotes him to first string.

Later, Daphne makes Viola volunteer at the Junior League carnival, where Olivia also working at a kissing booth. Viola is forced to juggle the responsibilities her mother gives her, and her life as "Sebastian" (including avoiding Monique), constantly changing in and out of her disguise. As Viola, she runs into Justin, whom she slaps in the face, and she later works a shift at the kissing booth after Olivia’s shift ends. There, she kisses Duke (who had initially been intending to kiss Olivia), who then gets into a fight with Justin. Duke expresses to "Sebastian" that he might move on from Olivia, as he is starting to like Viola now. She is delighted, as she secretly feels the same way.

Olivia, hoping to make "Sebastian" jealous, asks Duke out on a date, right as he was considering meeting Viola again, at "Sebastian's" suggestion. Viola, who is unaware of Olivia's true intentions, is enraged because Duke has now abandoned his interest in Viola. “Sebastian” manages to convince Olivia to take Duke to Cesario's for a double date with him and Eunice, which ends with "Sebastian" leaving, and Olivia leaving soon after. Later, at a preparation meeting for the debutante ball, Viola runs into Olivia, and asks her about her relationship with Duke. When Viola finds out that Olivia doesn't actually like Duke, she encourages Olivia to tell "Sebastian" directly how she feels. However, Monique overhears, and the three get into a fight. Complications arise when the real Sebastian returns from London a day early, unbeknownst to Viola, and sends Monique a voicemail to break up with her. When Sebastian arrives at Illyria, Olivia confesses her feelings and kisses him. Monique returns to her room and gets Sebastian’s voicemail and goes to his dorm to confront him. Duke sees Olivia kiss the real Sebastian and believes his roommate has betrayed him. When "Sebastian" returns to their room, they have an argument and Duke kicks him out, forcing “Sebastian” to sleep in Eunice’s room.

Monique comes to Sebastian’s dorm to confront him, but Duke tells her that Sebastian is not in the room, and gives Monique "Sebastian's" phone. On that phone, Monique picks up a call from Justin, leading her to find out that Viola has been attending Illyria in Sebastian's place. She meets Malcolm, and they plan to reveal what they've learned at the game, with the help of the school principal. Viola oversleeps and misses the first half of the game, while the real Sebastian is mistaken for "Sebastian" and winds up poorly playing his sister's game instead. When Monique, Malcolm, and the principal try to expose Sebastian as Viola, he proves he's the real Sebastian by dropping his pants. He then breaks up with Monique and later discovers Viola’s disguise. Viola explains the situation to him and they switch places again. Duke, still furious at "Sebastian", refuses to cooperate with him on the field. Determined to make amends, "Sebastian" shows everyone he is actually Viola by flashing her breasts. Illyria wins the game when Viola scores a goal, finally humiliating Justin and the rest of the Cornwall boys. Roger, Daphne, Kia, Yvonne and Paul joyously congratulate Viola on her victory.

Everyone at Illyria celebrates their victory over Cornwall except for Duke, who is hurt by Viola's deception. Viola introduces Sebastian to Olivia officially, and they begin dating. Viola suggests that she take Roger and Daphne to dinner, and they make up, exchanging contact information to be better parents for their children. Eunice and Toby begin dating as well. Viola sends Duke an apology and an invitation to her debutante ball. At the ball, Viola fears Duke won't show up, and distracts herself by assisting Olivia, who is being escorted to the ball by Sebastian, and is touched that Paul offers to be her date. Her mother shows up with a dress, but Viola decides to go for a walk instead.

Viola finds Duke outside, and he admits he has feelings for her, but insists on no more deception, which she promises. At the ball, Monique is escorted by Justin, Olivia by Sebastian, and Viola by Duke, who share a kiss before joining the crowd. At the end of the film, Viola and Duke are shown playing on Illyria's soccer team as teammates.

== Cast ==
- Amanda Bynes as Viola Hastings, a talented soccer player underestimated for being a girl, who dresses up as her fraternal twin brother Sebastian to play soccer at Illyria
- Channing Tatum as Duke Orsino, the soccer team captain, who is in love with Olivia and later, with Viola
- Laura Ramsey as Olivia Lennox, a smart girl who falls in love with "Sebastian" (Viola)
- Vinnie Jones as Coach Dinklage
- Julie Hagerty as Daphne Hastings, the mother of Viola and Sebastian
- David Cross as Principal Horatio Gold
- Jonathan Sadowski as Paul Antonio, Viola's best friend and hair stylist
- Robert Hoffman as Justin Drayton, Viola's ex-boyfriend and Duke's rival
- Robert Torti as Coach Pistonek
- James Snyder as Malcolm Festes, the school nerd and "Sebastian's" (Viola's) rival. He owns a pet tarantula Malvolio.
- Alex Breckenridge as Monique Valentine, Sebastian's superficial girlfriend
- Amanda Crew as Kia, one of Viola's friends
- Jessica Lucas as Yvonne, one of Viola's friends
- James Kirk as Sebastian Hastings, Viola's fraternal twin brother, who is in Europe with his band
- Emily Perkins as Eunice Bates, the nerdy and eccentric classmate with weird sexual fantasies
- John Pyper-Ferguson as Roger Hastings, the father of Viola and Sebastian
- Brandon Jay McLaren as Toby, one of Duke's best friends, who is attracted to Eunice
- Clifton Murray as Andrew, one of Duke's best friends
- Lynda Boyd as Cheryl, the debutante ball's hostess
- Katie Stuart as Maria, Olivia's friend
- Ken Kirby as the Announcer of the Illyria/Cornwall match
- Mark Acheson as Groundskeeper

== Production ==
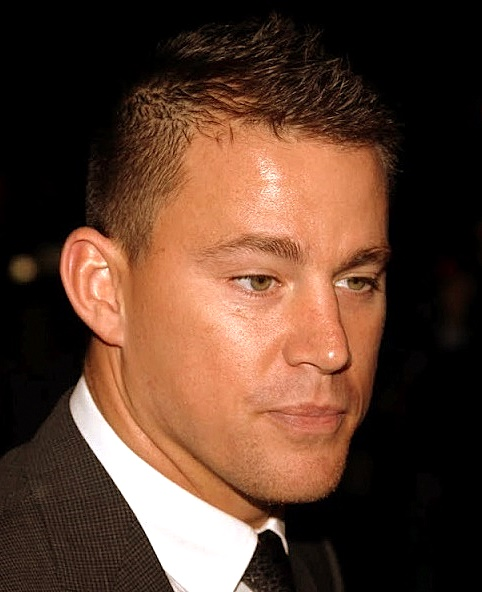
Channing Tatum was cast in the film at the insistence of Bynes, who felt that he would be perfect in the role.

An adaptation of William Shakespeare's Twelfth Night, the film was directed by Andy Fickman, produced by Lauren Shuler Donner, Tom Rosenberg, and Gary Lucchesi, and was written by Karen McCullah Lutz and Kirsten Smith. Amanda Bynes and Channing Tatum were cast respectively in the lead roles of Viola Hastings and Duke Orsino. Tatum had been chosen at Bynes's insistence, as she felt that he would be received well by audiences. She told Paper in 2018 that "I totally fought for Channing [to get cast in] that movie because he wasn't famous yet," she said. "He'd just done a Mountain Dew commercial and I was like, 'This guy's a star—every girl will love him!' But [the producers] were like, 'He's so much older than all of you!' And I was like, 'It doesn't matter! Trust me!'"

Preparing for the role, as it was her first time playing a role of the opposite sex, Bynes and Fickman observed males at a shopping mall. In an interview with MSN in 2006, she said that the part had been difficult for her to play, saying that she felt "awkward" in the role. Later, she spoke highly of the experience, saying that "It was hard, but I did it and I did something that was not easy for me—so it was a cathartic experience and I felt really good getting it out of me." However, in a 2018 interview with Paper, Bynes admitted that her role in the film eventually had a negative effect on her mental health. "When the movie came out and I saw it, I went into a deep depression for four to six months because I didn't like how I looked when I was a boy," Bynes said. Seeing herself onscreen with short hair, thick eyebrows, and sideburns was "a strange and out-of-body experience."

Neither Bynes nor Tatum were skilled playing soccer before filming, so they played for hours each day to prepare for the role. In a bathroom scene in the film, where a fight occurs between the characters of Bynes and actresses Laura Ramsey and Alexandra Breckenridge, some of the stunts performed had been done by the actors themselves. In a behind-the-scenes feature, Fickman said, "As much as we had our three wonderful stunt actresses there, too, when you see the cut of the movie, it's a lot of our girls pounding each other".

== Release ==
=== Home media ===
She's the Man debuted on DVD on June 27, 2006, in both widescreen and fullscreen editions. For the film's 15th anniversary, Paramount released the film on Blu-ray for the first time on March 2, 2021.

== Reception ==
=== Box office ===
She's the Man opened at No. 4 at the North American box office making $10.7 million in its opening weekend. Its budget was approximately $20–25 million, and the film grossed $33,687,630 million domestically with a total gross of $57.2 million worldwide.

=== Critical response ===
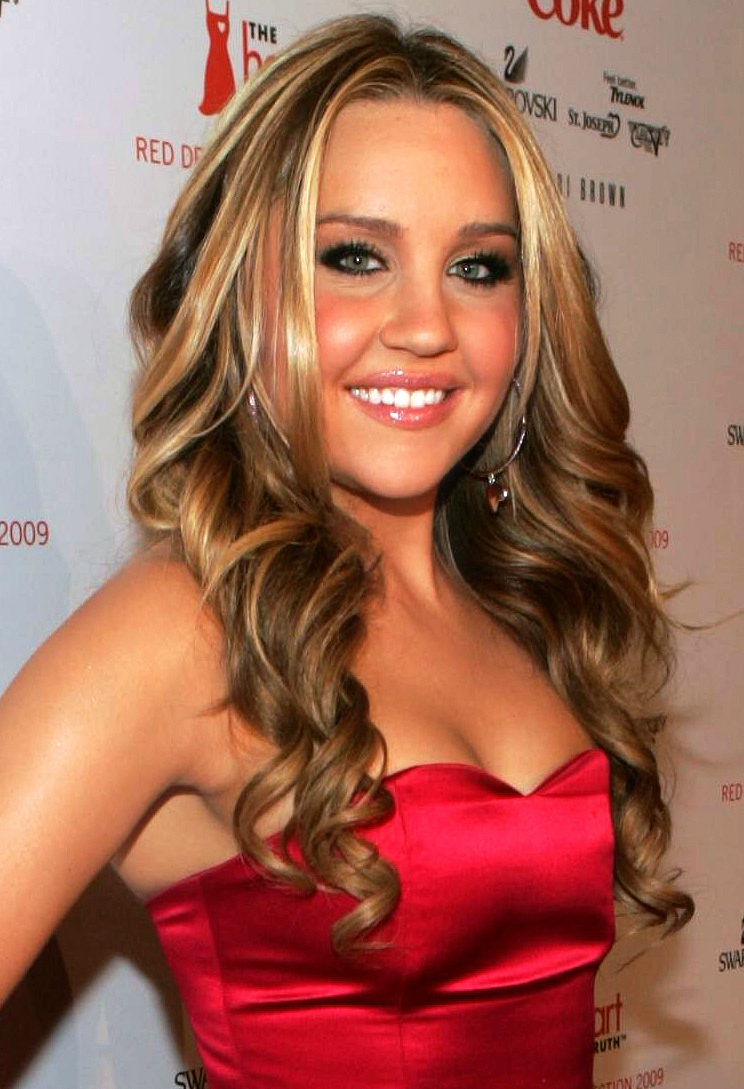
Bynes's performance won her a Nickelodeon Kids' Choice Award; it has often been considered as her signature film role.

Review aggregation website Rotten Tomatoes gave She's the Man a rating of 44% based on 113 reviews, with an average rating of 5.10/10. The critical consensus reads, "Shakespeare's wit gets lost in translation with She's the Man's broad slapstick, predictable jokes, and unconvincing plotline." Metacritic, gave the film has a weighted average score of 45 out of 100 based on reviews from 28 critics, indicating "mixed or average reviews". Audiences surveyed by CinemaScore gave the film a grade "B+" on scale of A to F.

Roger Ebert of the Chicago Sun-Times wrote "Of Amanda Bynes let us say that she is sunny and plucky and somehow finds a way to play her impossible role without clearing her throat more than six or eight times. More importantly, we like her." Writing for the San Francisco Chronicle, critic Ruth Stein said, "Bynes displays a flair for comedy, especially when Viola studies guys walking down the street and mimics their gait and mannerisms. Bynes uses her elastic face to show Viola's every thought making the transition and doing her darnedest to pull it off... She's not going to win an Oscar for playing a boy, as Hilary Swank did [in Boys Don't Cry (1999)]; but Bynes makes a far more convincing one than Barbra Streisand in Yentl (1983)."

Refinery29 reviewed Bynes in the dual role of Viola and Sebastian: "As Viola, Bynes is confident and charming, the kind of Jennifer Lawrence-like cool girl who would gladly hand you a tampon in the bathroom—as long as she’s not already using it to stop a nosebleed. As Sebastian, she oozes an inexplicable form of awkward charisma, spitting out perfect line delivery after perfect line delivery, her facial expressions working overtime to nail the laugh. It remains one of her best, most challenging performances."

There was criticism regarding Tatum's casting. Roger Ebert wrote: "Tatum is 26, a little old to play a high school kid." Neil Smith for BBCi said that "Bynes tackles her part with gusto, while Tatum underplays his to striking effect."

=== Accolades ===
| Date | Award | Category | Recipients | Result | Ref. |
|---|---|---|---|---|---|
| August 20, 2006 | Teen Choice Awards | Choice Movie: Comedy | She's The Man | Won | |
| August 20, 2006 | Teen Choice Awards | Choice Movie Actor: Breakout | Channing Tatum | Won | |
| August 20, 2006 | Teen Choice Awards | Choice Movie: Liplock | Channing Tatum & Amanda Bynes | Nominated | |
| 2007 | Stinkers Bad Movie Awards | Worst Actress | Amanda Bynes | Nominated | |
| 2007 | Stinkers Bad Movie Awards | Most Annoying Fake Accent (Female) | Amanda Bynes | Nominated | |
| 2007 | Stinkers Bad Movie Awards | Worst On-Screen Hairstyle | Amanda Bynes | Nominated | |
| March 31, 2007 | Kids' Choice Awards | Favorite Female Movie Star | Amanda Bynes | Won | |

== See also ==
- Hana-Kimi, a 1996–2004 shōjo manga literature series
- Just One of the Guys, a 1985 teen comedy with a similar premise
- List of association football films
