= Twelfth Night (disambiguation) =

Twelfth Night is a play by William Shakespeare.

Twelfth Night may also refer to:

== Film and television ==
- Twelfth Night (1910 film), a short silent film
- Twelfth Night (1933 film), a short Technicolor film
- Twelfth Night (1955 film) or Dvenadtsataya noch, a Russian language film
- Twelfth Night (Wednesday Theatre), a 1966 Australian television film
- Twelfth Night (ITV Sunday Night Theatre), a 1970 British television film
- Twelfth Night (1980 film), a film by John Gorrie for BBC Television Shakespeare
- Twelfth Night (1986 film), an Australian film
- Twelfth Night (1988 film), a television adaptation of Kenneth Branagh's 1987 stage production
- Twelfth Night (1996 film), a film by Trevor Nunn
- Twelfth Night, or What You Will, a 1998 TV film by Nicholas Hytner
- Twelfth Night, a 2018 film by Adam Smethurst

== Other uses ==
- Twelfth Night (holiday) or Epiphany Eve or the Twelfth Day of Christmas, January 5
- Twelfth Night (print), a caricature by the British artist George Cruikshank
- Twelfth Night (band), an English neo-progressive rock band
- Twelfth Night Theatre, a theatre in Brisbane, Queensland, Australian
