= Twelfth Night (1996 film) =

1996 film by Trevor Nunn

- Directed by: Trevor Nunn
- Screenplay by: Trevor Nunn
- Based on: Twelfth Night by William Shakespeare
- Produced by: Stephen Evans; David Parfitt
- Starring: Helena Bonham Carter; Richard E. Grant; Nigel Hawthorne; Ben Kingsley; Mel Smith; Imelda Staunton; Toby Stephens; Imogen Stubbs
- Narrated by: Ben Kingsley
- Cinematography: Clive Tickner
- Edited by: Peter Boyle
- Music by: Shaun Davey
- Production companies: Fine Line Features; Summit Entertainment; Renaissance Films; BBC Films; Circus Films
- Distributed by: Entertainment Film Distributors (United Kingdom); Fine Line Features (United States); Summit Entertainment (International)
- Release dates: 6 September 1996 (TIFF); 25 October 1996 (United Kingdom/United States)
- Running time: 134 minutes
- Countries: United Kingdom; United States; Ireland
- Language: English
- Budget: $5 million
- Box office: $33 million

Twelfth Night (also known as Twelfth Night: Or What You Will) is a 1996 romantic comedy film adaptation of William Shakespeare's play, directed by Trevor Nunn and featuring an all-star cast. Set in the late 19th century, it was filmed on location in Cornwall, including scenes shot at Padstow and at Lanhydrock House near Bodmin, with Orsino and his followers wearing uniforms that evoke the Austro-Hungarian Empire.

== Plot ==
On Twelfth Night, Viola (Imogen Stubbs) and Sebastian (Steven Mackintosh) are youthful twins who are performing on a ship; they use their likeness to tease their audiences. During the voyage, their ship is caught in a storm. The ship is wrecked and Viola and Sebastian are separated. Viola and some of the other survivors end up on the shore of Illyria. A devastated Viola believes her brother died in the wreck. She later takes his appearance to join the court of the local Duke Orsino (Toby Stephens). The young woman has her long, beautiful hair cut by the sailor, conceals her breasts, and dresses like a boy. After that, Viola becomes a page, using the name "Cesario".

Orsino is madly infatuated with Countess Olivia (Helena Bonham Carter), who is in mourning her brother who has recently died in a military action. She uses the tragedy as an excuse to avoid seeing the Duke, whom she does not love. The Duke sends his new page "Cesario" to do his wooing, and Olivia falls in love with the messenger, unaware of "Cesario"'s real gender. Realising Olivia's feelings for her alter ego, Viola is caught in even more of a quandary, in that she is in love with Orsino.

Meanwhile, members of Olivia's household plot against her pompous steward Malvolio (Nigel Hawthorne) by tricking him into believing that Olivia loves him. (Malvolio even wears a toupée to appear younger than he is.) His attempts to woo her, however, are met with bewilderment by Olivia who has him committed, where he is subjected to further humiliations by Maria (Imelda Staunton), Feste (Ben Kingsley), and Sir Toby Belch (Mel Smith).

Sir Toby, is Olivia's uncle and a notorious drunk. He is trying to encourage his friend, the idiotic Sir Andrew Aguecheek (Richard E. Grant) to court Olivia, but she purposely ignores him. Sir Toby pushes Sir Andrew into challenging "Cesario" to a duel, which goes very badly for Aguecheek.

Furthermore, Viola's twin, Sebastian, has in fact survived the wreck and has also arrived in Illyria, accompanied by Antonio (Nicholas Farrell), who saved him from drowning. Antonio, who has "many enemies in Orsino's court", is forced to flee when he is recognised and comes across "Cesario", whom he mistakes for Sebastian, and is outraged when "Cesario" fails to help him out.

Arriving at her estate, Sebastian meets Olivia, who, mistaking him for "Cesario", talks him into marrying her. When he learns of this, Orsino is furious and dismisses his page, whom he had made a friend and confidante. However, the matter is soon cleared up when Sebastian and "Cesario" come face-to-face and the latter reveals her real nature and identity as Viola. Orsino marries Viola.

The film ends with both couples holding a party to celebrate their marriages, while the supporting players, including the humiliated Sir Andrew and Malvolio, and the recently married Sir Toby and Maria, leave the estate with their heads held high and Feste sings his song, "The Wind and the Rain".

== Cast ==
- Imogen Stubbs as Viola
- Toby Stephens as Orsino
- Helena Bonham Carter as Olivia
- Steven Mackintosh as Sebastian
- Imelda Staunton as Maria
- Mel Smith as Sir Toby Belch
- Richard E. Grant as Sir Andrew Aguecheek
- Nigel Hawthorne as Malvolio
- Ben Kingsley as Feste
- Peter Gunn as Fabian
- Nicholas Farrell as Antonio
- James Walker as Priest
- Bob Baines as Priest

== Differences with the play ==
Extra dialogue was added at the beginning with Feste narrating the events surrounding the shipwreck and the separation of the twins and of a conflict between Viola and Orsino's native countries.

Viola and the other survivors hail from Messaline and when they end up in Illyria they are forced to hide and live like fugitives since "Messaline with this country is at war" over some trading disputes: The Captain mentions "The war between the merchants here and ours" while hiding in the cave from Orsino and his men. In the original play the Captain claims to have been "bred and born not three hours' travel from" where they got washed ashore.

The conflict is not mentioned again in the film (though it could be connected to Antonio's past as "Orsino's enemy"), and the Captain appears openly at the party at the end where he is embraced by Viola.

== Reception ==
On Rotten Tomatoes, 76% of 34 reviews are positive, and the average rating is 7/10. The site's critical consensus reads, "Director Trevor Nunn makes some questionable choices, but his stellar cast -- which includes Helena Bonham-Carter, Ben Kingsley, and Nigel Hawthorne -- more than rises to the material." Online film critic James Berardinelli writes, "With Twelfth Night, director Trevor Nunn (Lady Jane) follows in Branagh's footsteps by adapting one of the comedies for the screen. However, while this picture doesn't have quite the same level of style or energy evident in Much Ado About Nothing, solid performances and a lucid interpretation keep it afloat." Berardinelli calls it "solid entertainment." Roger Ebert gave it 3.5 out of 4, and praised Helena Bonham-Carter for her performance.
