= Daphne Hastings =

Daphne Hastings may refer to:

- Daphne Hastings, character in She's the Man
- Daphne Hastings, character in Bridgerton
