= Viola (Twelfth Night) =

Character in Twelfth Night

- Twelfth Night character
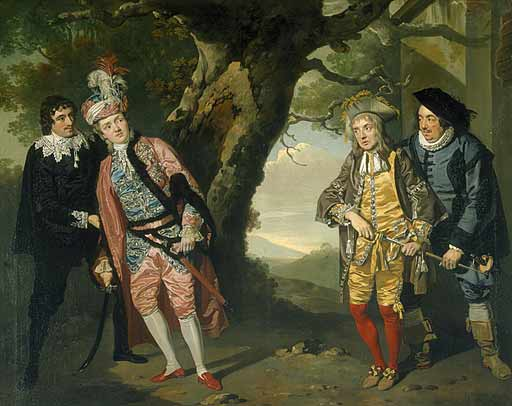
- Francis Wheatley painted the character Viola (second left) preparing to duel Sir Andrew Aguecheek, circa 1771
- Created by: William Shakespeare

In-universe information
- Aliases: Viola was disguised as a man, with the name of Cesario
- Family: Sebastian (twin brother)

Viola is the protagonist of the play Twelfth Night, written by William Shakespeare.

== Role in the play ==
As the central character, Viola's actions produce all of the play's momentum. She is a young woman of Messaline. In the beginning, Viola is found shipwrecked on the shores of Illyria and separated from her twin brother, not knowing whether he is alive or dead. The Sea Captain tells her that this place is ruled by the Duke Orsino, who is in love with Countess Olivia. Viola wants to serve her, but, finding this impossible, she has the Sea Captain dress her up like a eunuch, so that she can serve the Duke instead.

Viola chooses the name Cesario and secures a position as a page working for the Duke. He then entrusts Cesario (Viola) to express his love for Olivia, without knowing that Viola had begun to fall in love with him. When Viola hears this she is heartbroken but listens reluctantly. Cesario continues to pass messages back and forth between the Duke and Olivia, but this eventually places her in something of a quandary: she is forced by duty to do her best to plead Orsino's case to Olivia, but an internal conflict of interest arises when she falls in love with Orsino, and Olivia, believing her to be male, falls in love with her. Upon receiving a ring from Olivia's steward, Viola contemplates the love triangle her disguise has created, admitting only time can solve it.

When Sebastian, Viola's lost twin, arrives alive and well in Illyria with a pirate named Antonio, the chaos of mistaken identity ensues because of their remarkably similar looks, only made more similar due to Viola dressing up as a male. The absurdity of the identity crisis builds until Sebastian and Viola as Cesario meet for the first time, and eventually recognise one another. Olivia and Sebastian have already been secretly married, as she mistook him for Cesario, and Sebastian, ignorant of the foregoing love triangle, was simply entranced by a beautiful woman. Ultimately then, given what he has witnessed, Orsino admits that he will no longer pursue Olivia, agreeing to love her as his sister, and decides to take Viola as his wife once she quits her disguise.

Although Viola is the play's protagonist, her true name is not spoken by any character—including herself—until the final scene of the play (Act 5, scene 1).

== Art and stage depictions ==
Circa 1771, Francis Wheatley used actress Elizabeth Younge as a model to paint Viola in Act III, Scene 4, after she and Sir Andrew have drawn swords (painting top-right).

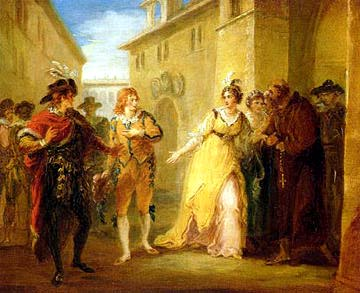
Viola (in orange, left) as Cesario; Olivia (in yellow, right). William Hamilton c. 1797

William Hamilton painted the confrontation between Olivia and Viola, circa 1797: in Act V, Scene 1. Olivia believes Viola (dressed as Cesario) to be Sebastian (Viola's twin brother) who she has just married. After Viola denies any knowledge, incredulous Olivia asks the priest to confirm they were married just two hours prior.

Walter Howell Deverell used model Elizabeth Siddal in her 1850 painting, showing Viola as Cesario looking longingly at Duke Orsino.

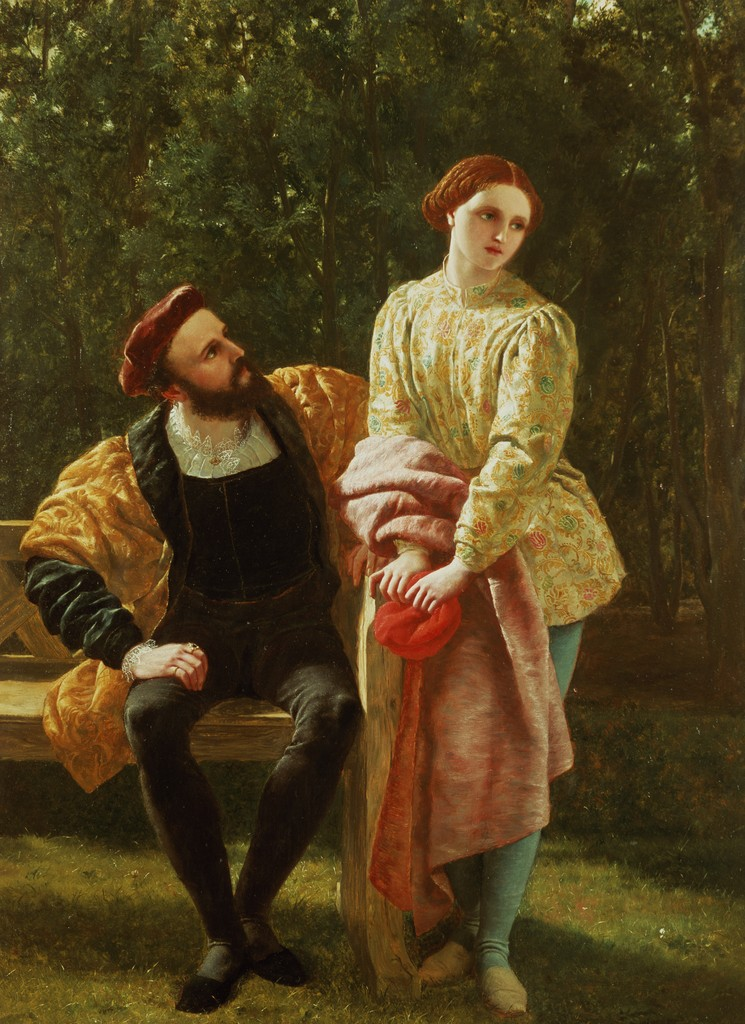
Frederick Richard Pickersgill's painting of Orsino and Viola, mid-1800s

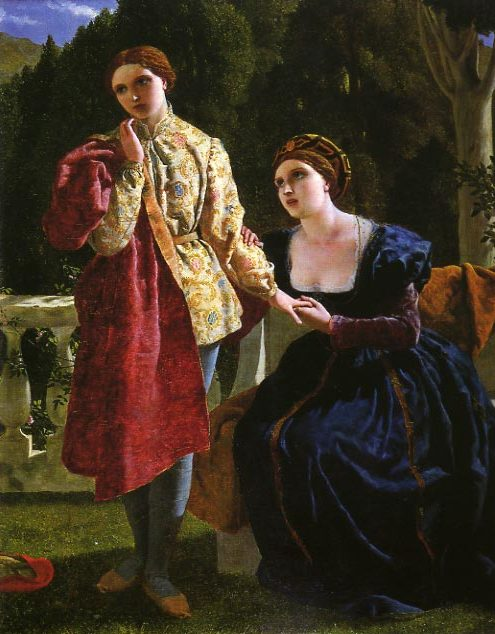
Viola and the Countess (F. R. Pickersgill, 1859)

In the mid-19th century, Frederick Richard Pickersgill painted a few scenes, including: in Act 1, Scene 4, after the character Viola is shipwrecked, when she cross-dresses as Cesario, enters the service of Duke Orsino as his page and falls in love with him; and in Act 3, Scene 1, when Olivia declares her love for Cesario (1859 painting).

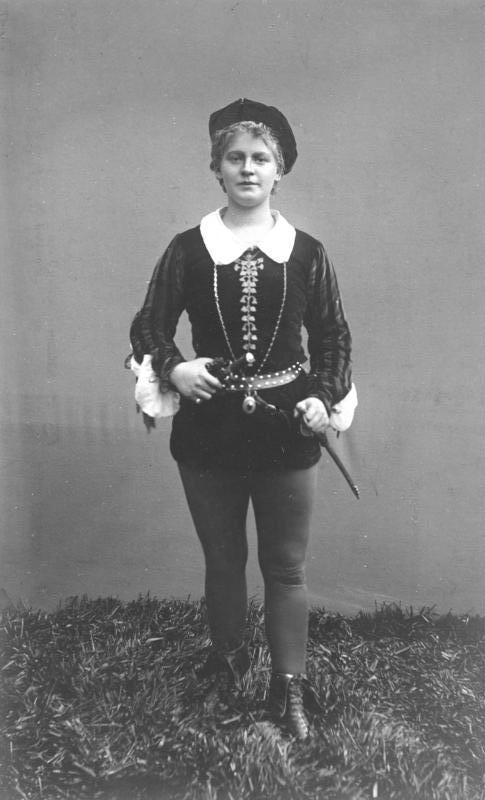
Lucie Höflich as Viola in a German version of Shakespeare's Twelfth Night in 1907 at the Deutsches Theater

In the early 20th century, German actress Lucie Höflich played Viola in Was ihr wollt (Twelfth Night in German) at the Deutsches Theater in Berlin.

Tallulah Bankhead played Viola in a 1937 radio broadcast of the play.

Eddie Redmayne made his professional stage debut as Viola for Shakespeare's Globe at the Middle Temple Hall in 2002.

In 2009, Anne Hathaway played Viola in the Shakespeare in the Park production of Twelfth Night in Central Park, directed by David Sullivan.

Jennifer Paredes portrayed Viola in the Old Globe Theatre's 2017 production of Twelfth Night.

== Film representations ==
- Twelfth Night (1910) – Directed by Eugene Mullin – Viola: Florence Turner
- Twelfth Night (1937) – Director N/A – Viola: Dorothy Black
- Twelfth Night (1939) – Directed by Michel Saint Denis – Viola: Peggy Ashcroft
- Twelfth Night (1957) [TV] – Directed by David Greene – Viola: Rosemary Harris
- Twelfth Night (1957) – Directed by Caspar Wrede – Viola: Dilys Hamlett
- Twelfth Night (1970) – Directed by John Sichel – Viola: Joan Plowright
- Twelfth Night (1974) – Directed by David Giles – Viola: Janet Suzman
- Twelfth Night (1980) [TV] – Directed by John Gorrie – Viola: Felicity Kendal
- Twelfth Night (1986) – Directed by Neil Armfield – Viola: Gillian Jones
- Twelfth Night or What You Will (1988) – Directed by Kenneth Branagh of the Royal Shakespeare Company/produced for television by Thames Television – Viola: Frances Barber
- Twelfth Night, or What You Will (1988) [TV] – Directed by Paul Kafno – Viola: Frances Barber
- Twelfth Night (1992) – [Animated Tales] – Directed by Mariya Muat – Viola: Fiona Shaw
- Twelfth Night (1996) – Directed by Trevor Nunn – Viola: Imogen Stubbs
- Twelfth Night, or What You Will (1998) [TV] – Directed by Nicholas Hytner – Viola: Helen Hunt
- Shakespeare in Love (1998) – Directed by John Madden – Viola de Lesseps: Gwyneth Paltrow (Academy Award-winning performance)
- Twelfth Night, or What You Will (2003) – Directed by Tim Supple – Viola: Parminder Nagra
- She's the Man (2006) – Directed by Andy Fickman – Viola Hastings: Amanda Bynes (Inspired by Twelfth Night)
- Twelfth Night (2018) – Directed by Adam Smethurst – Viola: Sheila Atim
