= Twelfth Night (1988 film) =

1988 UK filmed stage production

- Written by: William Shakespeare (original play)
- Directed by: Paul Kafno (television); Kenneth Branagh (original stage production)
- Starring: Frances Barber; Richard Briers
- Country of origin: United Kingdom
- Original language: English

Production
- Producer: Paul Kafno
- Running time: 165 minutes

Original release
- Network: Channel 4
- Release: 30 December 1988

Twelfth Night, or, What You Will is a videotaped 1988 television adaptation of Kenneth Branagh's stage production for the Renaissance Theatre Company of William Shakespeare's Twelfth Night first broadcast in the UK by Channel 4 on 30 December 1988. Made by Thames Television in collaboration with Renaissance, it stars Frances Barber as Viola and Richard Briers as Malvolio. The recording was shot on a single set with the appearance of a wintry garden. The costumes are Victorian, and the time of year is Christmas.

== Cast ==
- Christopher Ravenscroft as Orsino
- Caroline Langrishe as Olivia
- James Saxon as Sir Toby Belch
- James Simmons as Sir Andrew Aguecheek
- Frances Barber as Viola
- Christopher Hollis as Sebastian and Curio
- Richard Briers as Malvolio
- Julian Gartside as Valentine
- Shaun Prendergast as Fabian
- Abigail McKern as Maria
- Tim Barker as the Sea Captain and Antonio
- Anton Lesser as Feste

== Reception ==
Michael Brooke, in his piece for the BFI's Screenonline website, particularly commends Briers performance. His "Malvolio is a delight, segueing seamlessly from self-righteous pomposity at inappropriate revelry to truly grotesque self-delusion as he proffers love to his mistress while clad in yellow stockings".
