= Feste =

Character in Twelfth Night

- Twelfth Night character
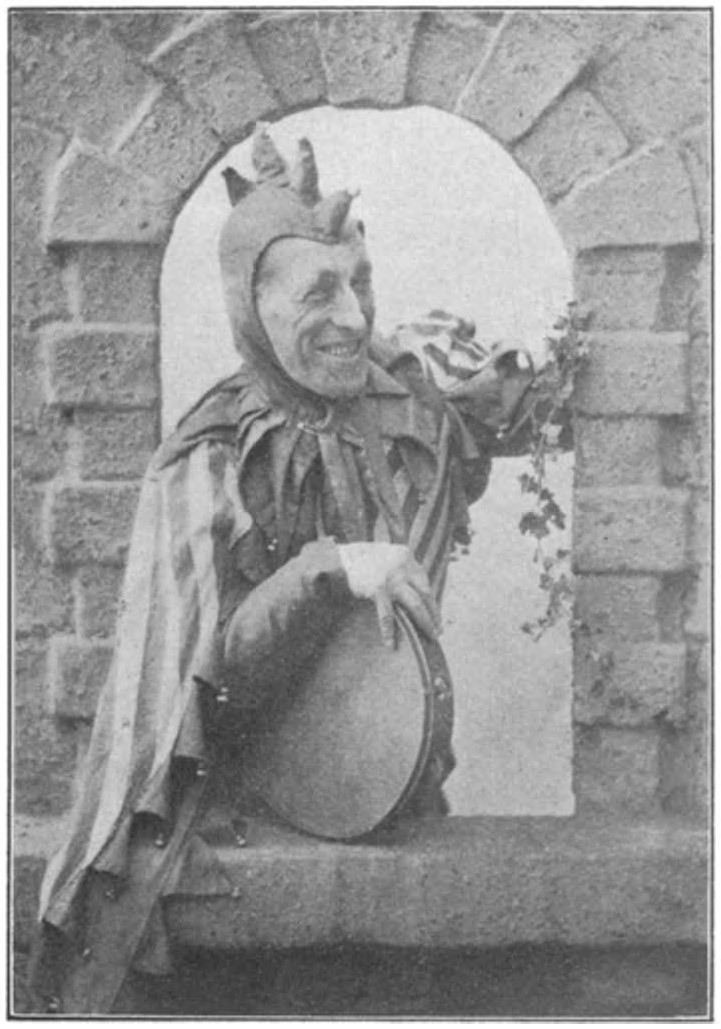
- Actor Louis H. Chrispijn as Feste, ca. 1899
- Created by: William Shakespeare

Feste is a fictional character in William Shakespeare's comedy Twelfth Night. He is a fool (royal jester) attached to the household of the Countess Olivia. He has apparently been there for some time, as he was a "fool that the Lady Olivia's father took much delight in" (2.4). Although Olivia's father has died within the last year, it is possible that Feste approaches or has reached middle age, though he still has the wit to carry off good 'fooling' when he needs to, and the voice to sing lustily or mournfully as the occasion demands. He is referred to by name only once during the play, in answer to an inquiry by Orsino of who sang a song that he heard the previous evening. Curio responds "Feste, the jester, my lord; a fool that the lady Olivia's father took much delight in. He is about the house" (2.4). Throughout the rest of the play, he is addressed only as "Fool," while in the stage directions he is mentioned as "Clown."

Feste seems to leave Olivia's house and return at his pleasure rather too freely for a servant. (At the very least he is doing some free-lance entertaining over at the house of Duke Orsino (2.4).) His habit of roaming gets him into trouble with Olivia: when we first see him, he must talk his way out of being turned out—a grim fate in those days—for being absent, as it were, without leave. He succeeds, and once back in his lady's good graces, he weaves in and out of the action with the sort of impunity that was reserved for a person nobody took seriously.

== Performances ==
There are instances in the play where Feste is believed to be an almost omniscient presence. Some critics have suggested that there are moments where it seems Feste knows more about Viola/Cesario's disguise than he lets on and certain stage and film adaptations have taken this approach with their portrayal of the fool.

A good example is in Trevor Nunn's film adaptation, in which Ben Kingsley is constantly present in the scenes that reveal the plot—in fact he is the narrator at the start of the film, describing the shipwreck and the separation of the twins. He is then shown watching Viola arrive in Illyria and the film ends with him watching the various supporting players leave Olivia's estate. When Viola removes her "Cesario" disguise he gives her a golden necklace which she discarded when first shipwrecked on Illyria's shores.

Kingsley's Feste dresses in old clothes and appears to be a wanderer of no fixed abode, though he slips in and out of Olivia's estate at his will. He plays a number of musical instruments and, like most of the cast, displays a mixture of comedy and pathos.

== Songs/poems ==
Feste, as a fool, has a repertoire of songs:

=== O Mistress Mine ===
O mistress mine, where are you roaming?
O, stay and hear; your true-love's coming,
That can sing both high and low:
Trip no further, pretty sweeting;
Journeys end in lovers' meeting,
Every wise man's son doth know.

What is love? 'tis not hereafter;
Present mirth hath present laughter;
What's to come is still unsure:
In delay there lies no plenty;
Then come kiss me, sweet-and-twenty,
Youth's a stuff will not endure.

=== Come Away, Death ===
Come away, come away, death,
And in sad cypress let me be laid.
Fly away, fly away breath,
I am slain by a fair cruel maid.

My shroud of white, stuck all with yew,
O, prepare it!
My part of death, no one so true
O, did share it.

Not a flower, not a flower sweet
On my black coffin let there be strown.
Not a friend, not a friend greet
My poor corpse, where my bones shall be thrown.

A thousand thousand sighs to save,
Lay me, O, where
Sad true lover never find my grave,
O, to weep there!
To weep there.

=== Hey Robin, Jolly Robin ===
Hey Robin, jolly Robin,
Tell me how thy lady does.
My lady is unkind, perdy.
Alas, why is she so?
She loves another --

This song is interrupted partway through.

=== I Am Gone, Sir ===
I am gone, sir.
And anon, sir,
I'll be with you again,
In a trice,
Like to the old Vice,
Your need to sustain.
Who with dagger of lath,
In his rage and his wrath,
Cries "Ah ha" to the devil.
Like a mad lad,
"Pare thy nails, dad."
Adieu, good man devils.

=== Feste's Song ===
When that I was and a little tiny boy,
With hey, ho, the wind and the rain,
A foolish thing was but a toy,
For the rain it raineth every day.

But when I came to man's estate,
With hey, ho, the wind and the rain,
'Gainst knaves and thieves men shut their gate,
For the rain, it raineth every day.

But when I came, alas, to wive,
With hey, ho, the wind and the rain,
By swaggering could I never thrive,
For the rain, it raineth every day.

But when I came unto my beds,
With hey, ho, the wind and the rain,
With tosspots still had drunken heads,
For the rain, it raineth every day.

A great while ago the world begun,
With hey, ho, the wind and the rain.
But that's all one, our play is done,
And we'll strive to please you every day.

== Quotes ==
While portraying the part of the perfect fool, Feste illustrates his intelligence and distinct understanding of events by saying "Better a witty fool than a foolish wit."

== In the arts ==
In Niall Williams novel, History of the Rain, Abraham gives his son Virgil the middle name Feste.

The Joe Jackson song "Fool", from the 2019 album of the same title, is largely about fools in the Shakespearean tradition and incorporates lines from Feste's Song (such as "hey ho, the wind and the rain") as well as referencing Feste directly in the third verse ("Kill the king, but you can't kill Feste/Long live the jester! Long live the jester!").
