= Twelfth Night =

Play by William Shakespeare

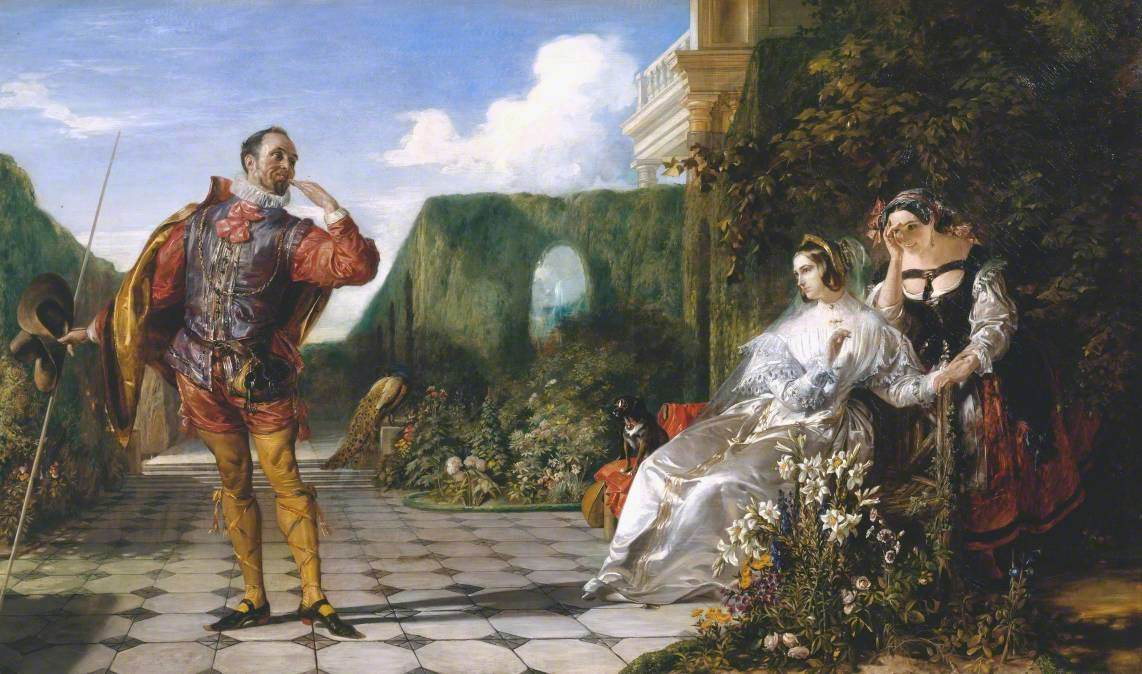
Malvolio and the Countess by Daniel Maclise (1840)

Twelfth Night, or What You Will is a romantic comedy by William Shakespeare, believed to have been written around 1601–1602 as a Twelfth Night entertainment for the close of the Christmas season. The play centres on the twins Viola and Sebastian, who are separated in a shipwreck. Viola (disguised as a page named Cesario) falls in love with the Duke Orsino, who in turn is in love with Countess Olivia. Upon meeting Viola, Countess Olivia falls in love with her, thinking she is a man.

The play expanded on the musical interludes and riotous disorder expected of the occasion, with plot elements drawn from Barnabe Rich's short story "Of Apollonius and Silla", based on a story by Matteo Bandello. The first documented public performance was on 2 February 1602, at Candlemas, the formal end of the Christmastide–Epiphanytide season in the Christian liturgical year's calendar. The play was not published until its inclusion in the 1623 First Folio.

== Characters ==
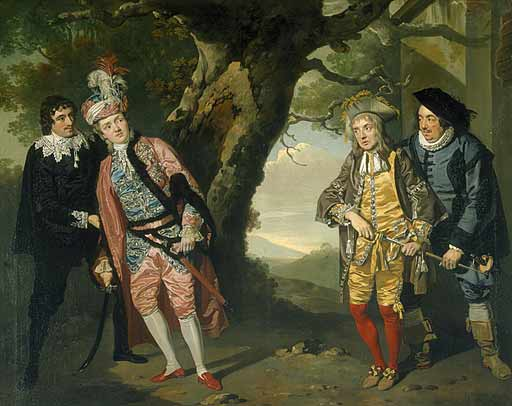
Scene from Twelfth Night, by Francis Wheatley (1771–72)

- Viola – a shipwrecked young woman who disguises herself as a page named Cesario
- Sebastian – Viola's twin brother
- Duke Orsino – Duke of Illyria
- Olivia – a wealthy countess
- Malvolio – steward in Olivia's household
- Maria – Olivia's gentlewoman
- Sir Toby Belch – Olivia's uncle
- Sir Andrew Aguecheek – a friend of Sir Toby
- Feste – Olivia's servant, a jester
- Fabian – a servant in Olivia's household
- Antonio – a sea captain and friend to Sebastian
- Valentine and Curio – gentlemen attending on the Duke
- A Sea Captain – a friend to Viola

== Synopsis ==
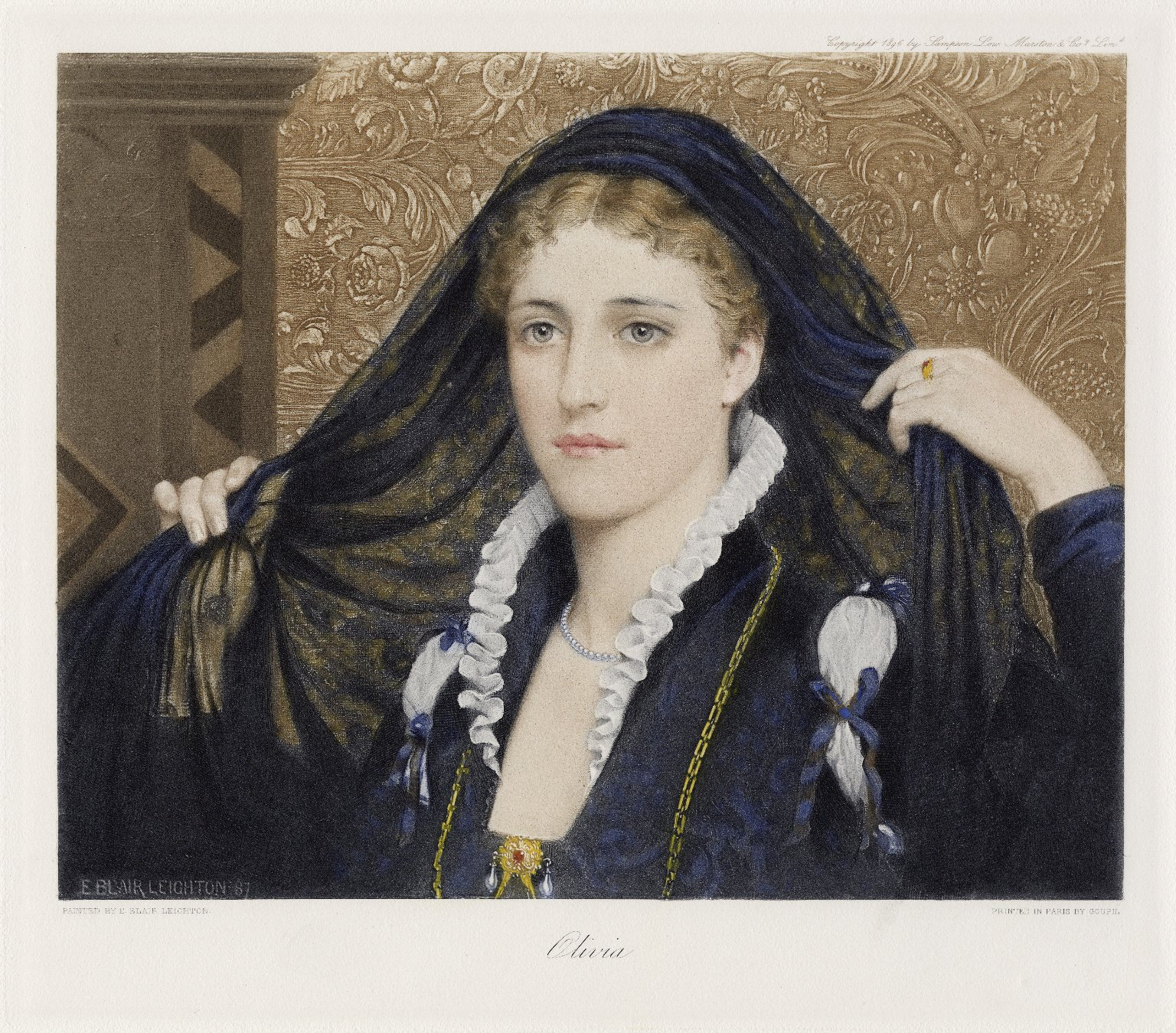
A depiction of Olivia by Edmund Leighton from The Graphic Gallery of Shakespeare's Heroines

Viola is shipwrecked on the coast of Illyria and comes ashore with a captain's help. She has lost contact with her twin brother, Sebastian, who she believes has drowned. With the aid of the Captain she disguises herself as a young man named Cesario and enters the service of Duke Orsino. Orsino has convinced himself he is in love with Olivia who is in mourning and who therefore refuses to see entertainments, be in the company of men, or accept love or marriage proposals from anyone, including Orsino, until seven years have passed. Orsino then uses "Cesario" as an intermediary to profess his passionate love for Olivia. But Olivia falls in love with "Cesario", setting her at odds with her professed duty. Meanwhile, Viola has fallen in love with Orsino, creating a love triangle: Viola loves Orsino, Orsino loves Olivia, and Olivia loves Viola disguised as Cesario.

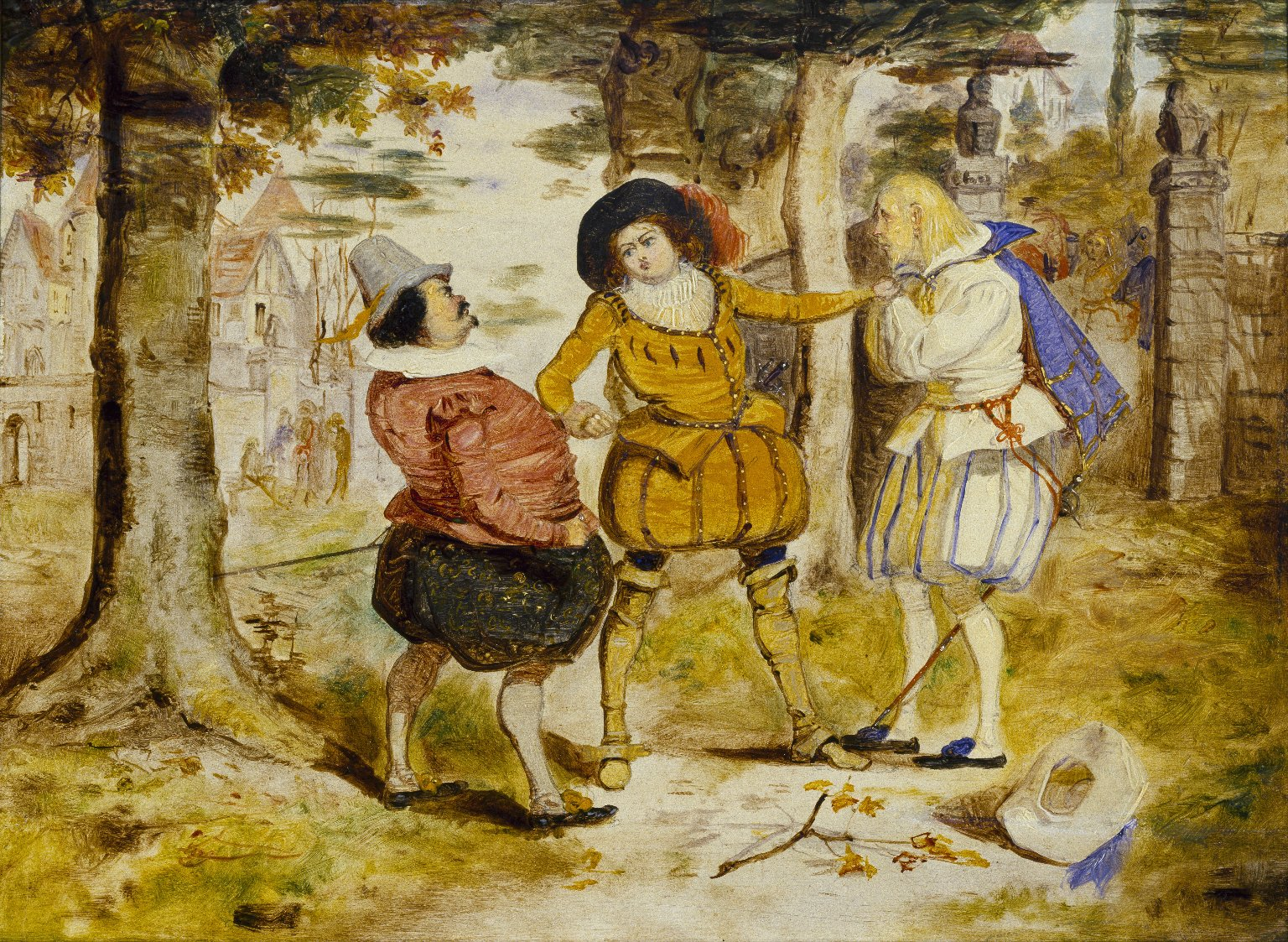
Sir Toby Belch coming to the assistance of Sir Andrew Aguecheek, Arthur Boyd Houghton, c. 1854

In the comic subplot, several characters conspire to make Olivia's pompous steward, Malvolio, believe that she has fallen for him. This involves Olivia's riotous uncle, Sir Toby Belch; another would-be suitor, the silly squire Sir Andrew Aguecheek; Olivia's servants Maria and Fabian; and Olivia's witty fool, Feste. Sir Toby and Sir Andrew engage themselves in drinking and revelry, disrupting the peace of Olivia's household until late into the night, prompting Malvolio to chastise them. Sir Toby famously retorts,

"Dost thou think, because thou art virtuous, there shall be no more cakes and ale?" (Act II, Scene III).

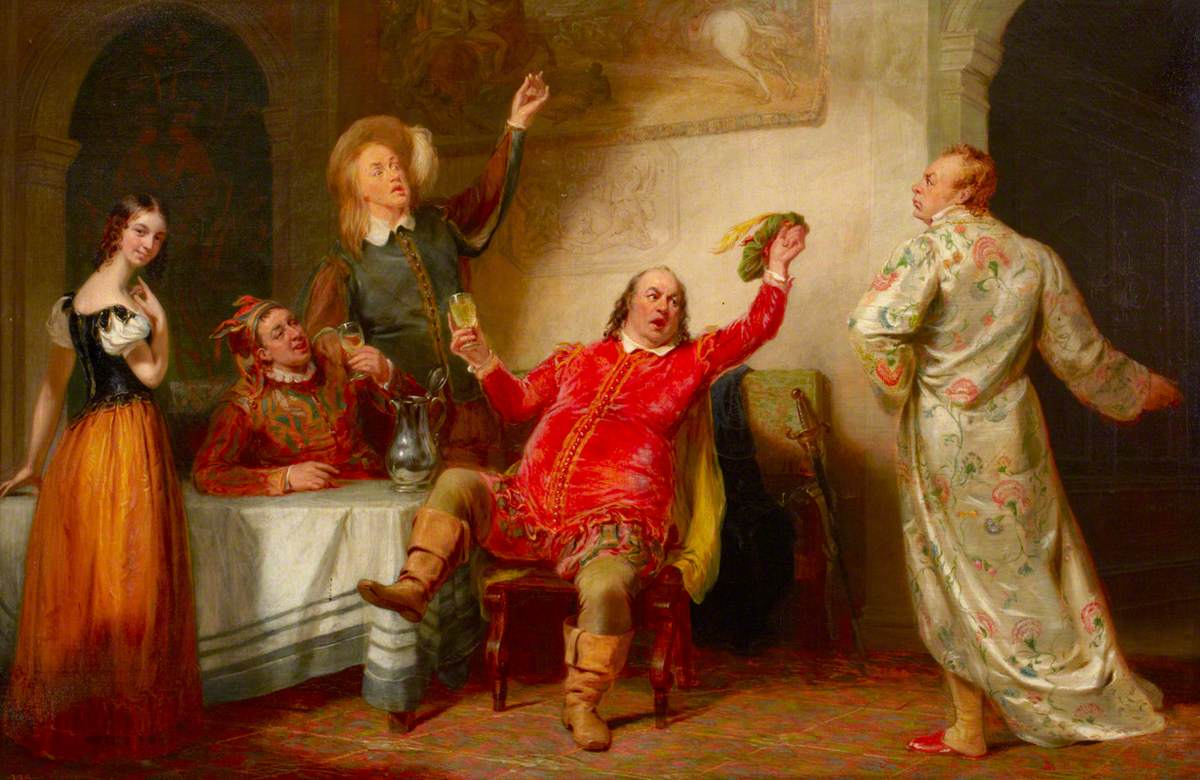
Malvolio and Sir Toby (from William Shakespeare's 'Twelfth Night', Act II, scene iii), George Clint (c.1833)

Maria suggests taking revenge on Malvolio by convincing him that Olivia is secretly in love with him. She forges a love letter, mimicking Olivia's handwriting, and plants it in the garden. The letter asks Malvolio to wear yellow stockings cross-gartered—a colour and fashion that Olivia hates, to be rude to the rest of the servants, and to smile constantly in Olivia's presence. Watched by Sir Toby, Sir Andrew, and Fabian, Malvolio finds the letter and is surprised and delighted. He starts following the letter's instructions to show Olivia his feelings. Olivia is shocked by the changes in him and, agreeing that he seems mad, leaves him to be cared for by his tormentors. Pretending that Malvolio is insane, the tormentors lock him in a dark chamber. Feste visits Malvolio to mock Malvolio's professed insanity, both as himself and disguised as a priest.

Meanwhile, Viola's twin, Sebastian, has been rescued by Antonio, a sea captain who previously fought Orsino, yet who accompanies Sebastian to Illyria, despite the danger, because of his admiration for Sebastian.

With their love for practical jokes, Sir Toby and Fabian convince Sir Andrew to challenge Cesario to a duel, knowing that neither of them can fight. Their initial duel is interrupted by Antonio, who believes Cesario to be Sebastian. Orsino's officers then arrest Antonio. Emboldened by this, Sir Andrew mistakes Sebastian for Cesario and slaps him, prompting Sebastian to beat up Sir Andrew. Olivia witnesses the skirmish and chastises Sir Toby, Sir Andrew, and Fabian. Taking Sebastian for "Cesario", Olivia asks him to marry her, and they are secretly married in a church. Finally, when "Cesario" and Sebastian appear in the presence of both Olivia and Orsino, there is more wonder and confusion at their physical similarity. At this point, Viola reveals her identity and is reunited with her brother.

Sebastian and Viola reunite, and the cases of mistaken identity are resolved. Orsino and Viola marry (Orsino to Viola: "But when in other habits you are seen, Orsino's mistress, and his fancy's queen"). Fabian confesses the plot against Malvolio, and reveals that Sir Toby has married Maria. Malvolio swears revenge on his tormentors and stalks off, but Orsino sends Fabian to placate him. The play ends with a song sung by Feste.

== Setting ==
Illyria, the exotic setting of Twelfth Night, is important to the play's romantic atmosphere.

Illyria was an ancient region of the Western Balkans whose coast (the eastern coast of the Adriatic Sea, the only part of ancient Illyria relevant to the play) covered (from north to south) the coasts of modern-day Slovenia, Croatia, Bosnia and Herzegovina, Montenegro, and Albania. It included the city-state of the Republic of Ragusa, which has been proposed as the setting, and which is today known as Dubrovnik, Croatia.

Illyria may have been suggested by the Roman comedy Menaechmi, the plot of which also involves twins who are mistaken for each other. Illyria is also referred to as a site of pirates in Shakespeare's earlier play, Henry VI, Part 2. Most of the characters' names are Italian but some of the comic characters have English names. Oddly, the "Illyrian" lady Olivia has an English uncle, Sir Toby Belch.

It has been noted that the play's setting has other English allusions, such as Viola's use of "Westward ho!", a typical cry of 16th-century London boatmen, and Antonio's recommendation to Sebastian of "The Elephant" as the best place to lodge in Illyria (The Elephant was a pub not far from the Globe Theatre).

== Sources ==
The play is believed to have drawn extensively on the Italian production Gl'ingannati (The Deceived Ones), collectively written by the Accademia degli Intronati of Siena in 1531. It is conjectured that the name of its male lead, Orsino, was suggested by Virginio Orsini, Duke of Bracciano, an Italian nobleman who visited London in the winter of 1600–01.

Another source story, "Of Apollonius and Silla", appeared in Barnabe Riche's collection Riche his Farewell to Militarie Profession conteining verie pleasaunt discourses fit for a peaceable tyme (1581), which in turn derives from a story by Matteo Bandello.

"Twelfth Night" is a reference to the twelfth night after Christmas Day, also called the Eve of the Feast of Epiphany. It was originally a Catholic holiday, and these were sometimes occasions for revelry, like other Christian feast days. Servants often dressed up as their masters, men as women, and so forth. This history of festive ritual and carnivalesque reversal (Note: The carnival-like atmosphere is based on the then-1,000-year earlier ancient Roman festival of the Saturnalia held at the same time of year. The Saturnalia was characterized by drunken revelry and inversion of the social order: masters became servants for a day, and vice versa.) is the cultural origin of the play's gender-confusion-driven plot. Puritans often opposed Epiphany celebrations, much as Malvolio opposes the revelry in the play.

The actual Elizabethan festival of Twelfth Night involved the antics of a Lord of Misrule, who, before leaving his temporary position of authority, called for entertainment, songs, and mummery; the play has been regarded as preserving this festive and traditional atmosphere of licensed disorder. This leads to the general inversion of the order of things, most notably gender roles. The embittered and isolated Malvolio can be regarded as an adversary of festive enjoyment and community. That community is led by Sir Toby Belch, "the vice-regent spokesman for cakes and ale", and his partner in a comic stock duo, the simple and constantly exploited Sir Andrew Aguecheek.

== Date and text ==
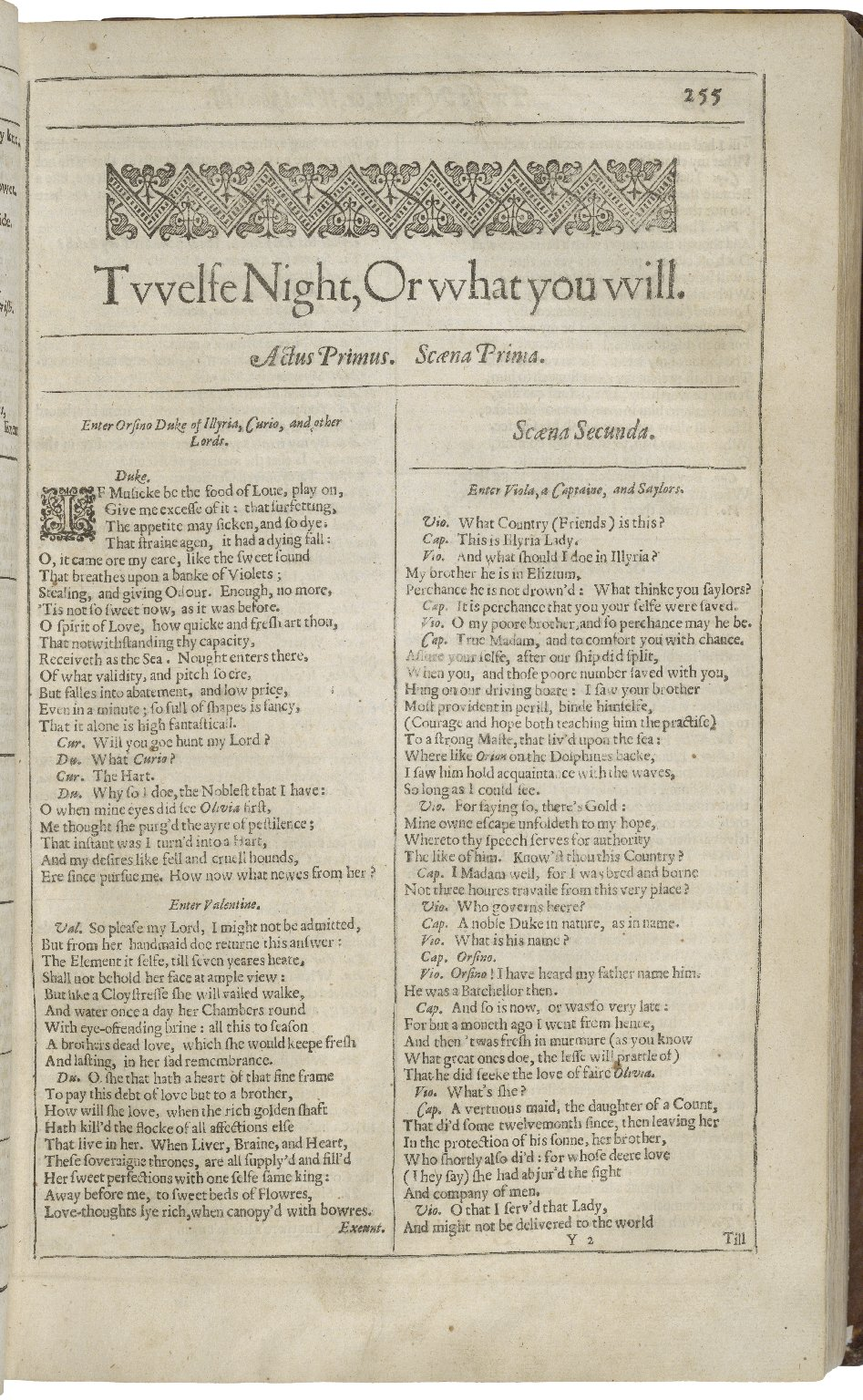
The title page of Twelfth Night from the 1623 First Folio

The full title of the play is Twelfth Night, or What You Will. Subtitles for plays were fashionable in the Elizabethan era, and though some editors place The Merchant of Venice's alternative title, The Jew of Venice, as a subtitle, this is the only Shakespeare play to bear one when first published.

The play was probably finished between 1600 and 1601, a period suggested by the play's referencing of events that happened during that time. A law student, John Manningham, who was studying in the Middle Temple in London, described the performance on 2 February 1602 (Candlemas) which took place in the hall of the Middle Temple at the formal end of Christmastide in the year's calendar, and to which students were invited. This was the first recorded public performance of the play. The play was not published until its inclusion in the First Folio in 1623.

== Themes ==
=== Gender ===
Viola is not alone among Shakespeare's cross-dressing heroines; in Shakespeare's theatre, convention dictated that adolescent boys play female characters, creating humour in the multiplicity of disguise found in a female character who for a while pretended at masculinity. Her cross-dressing enables Viola to fulfil usually male roles, such as acting as a messenger between Orsino and Olivia or serving as Orsino's confidant. But she does not use her disguise to intervene directly in the plot (unlike other Shakespearean heroines, such as Rosalind in As You Like It and Portia in The Merchant of Venice), remaining someone who allows "Time" to untangle the plot.

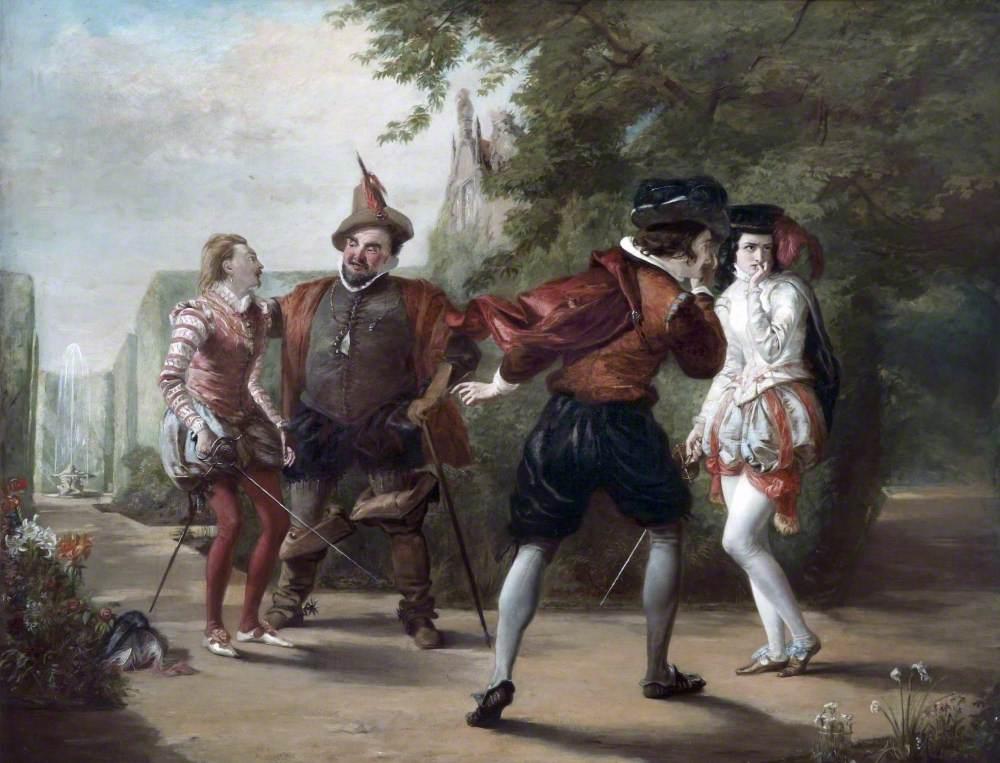
The Duel Scene from 'Twelfth Night' by William Shakespeare, William Powell Frith (1842)

As Twelfth Night explores gender identity and sexual attraction, having a male actor play Viola enhanced the impression of androgyny and sexual ambiguity. Some modern scholars believe that Twelfth Night, with the added confusion of male actors and Viola's deception, addresses gender issues "with particular immediacy". They also accept that its depiction of gender stems from the era's prevalent scientific theory that females are simply imperfect males. This belief explains the almost indistinguishable differences between the sexes reflected in the play's casting and characters.

=== Metatheatre ===
At Olivia's first meeting with "Cesario" (Viola) in Act I, Scene v, she asks her "Are you a comedian?" (an Elizabethan term for "actor"). Viola's reply, "I am not that I play", epitomising her adoption of the role of "Cesario" (Viola), is regarded as one of the play's several references to theatricality and "playing". The plot against Malvolio revolves around these ideas, and Fabian remarks in Act III, Scene iv: "If this were play'd upon a stage now, I could condemn it as an improbable fiction". In Act IV, Scene ii, Feste (The Fool) plays both parts in the "play" for Malvolio's benefit, alternating between adopting the voice of the local curate, Sir Topas, and his own voice. He finishes by likening himself to "the old Vice" of English Morality plays. Other influences of the English folk tradition can be seen in Feste's songs and dialogue, such as his final song in Act V. The last line of this song, "And we'll strive to please you every day", echoes similar lines from several English folk plays.

== Performance history ==
=== During and just after Shakespeare's lifetime ===
Some scholars argue that Twelfth Night, or What You Will (the play's full title) was probably commissioned for performance as part of the Twelfth Night celebrations held by Queen Elizabeth I at Whitehall Palace on 6 January 1601 to mark the end of the embassy of the Italian diplomat, the Duke of Orsino. Others dispute this, arguing that the "rigid etiquette of Queen Elizabeth's court" would have made it "impossible" for Shakespeare to name a main character in a comedy for the very diplomat attending the performance, and that it is more likely that Shakespeare used the name from the 1601 diplomatic visit when writing his play, which premiered the next winter. It was again performed at Court on Easter Monday in 1618 and on Candlemas night in 1623.

The earliest public performance took place at Middle Temple Hall, one of the Inns of Court, on 2 February (Candlemas night) 1602. The lawyer John Manningham wrote in his diary:

At our feast we had a play called "Twelve Night, or What You Will", much like "The Comedy of Errors" or "Menaechmi" in Plautus, but most like and near to that in Italian called "Inganni". A good practice in it to make the steward believe his lady-widow was in love with him, by counterfeiting a letter as from his lady, in general terms telling him what she liked best in him and prescribing his gesture in smiling, his apparel, etc. and then, when he came to practice, making him believe they took him for mad.

Clearly, Manningham enjoyed the Malvolio story most of all, and noted the play's similarity to Shakespeare's earlier play, as well as its relationship with one of its sources, the Inganni plays.

=== Restoration to 20th century ===
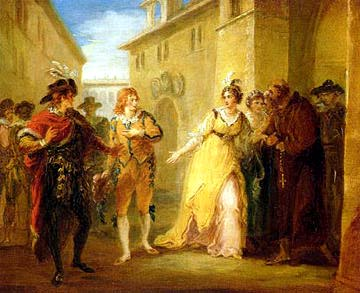
A Scene from Twelfth Night by William Shakespeare: Act V, Scene i (William Hamilton, c. 1797)

The play was one of the earliest Shakespearean works acted at the start of the Restoration; Sir William Davenant's adaptation was staged in 1661, with Thomas Betterton as Sir Toby Belch. Samuel Pepys thought it "a silly play", but saw it three times anyway during the period of his diary on 11 September 1661, 6 January 1663, and 20 January 1669. Another adaptation, Love Betray'd, or, The Agreeable Disappointment, was acted at Lincoln's Inn Fields in 1703.

After holding the stage only in the adaptations in the late 17th century and early 18th century, the original Shakespearean text of Twelfth Night was revived in 1741, in a production at Drury Lane. In 1820 an operatic version by Frederic Reynolds was staged, with music by Henry Bishop.

=== 20th and 21st century ===
Influential productions were staged in 1912, by Harley Granville-Barker, and in 1916, at the Old Vic.

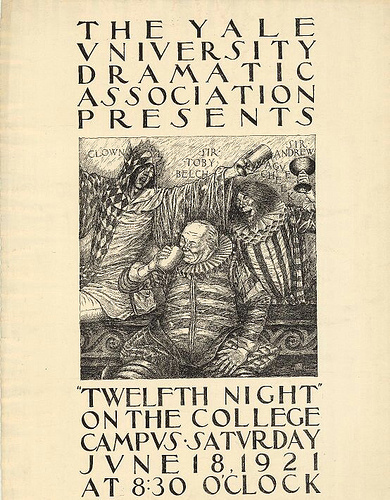
Poster advertising performances of Twelfth Night by Yale University Dramatic Association, New Haven, Connecticut, 1921

Lilian Baylis reopened the long-dormant Sadler's Wells Theatre in 1931 with a notable production of the play starring Ralph Richardson as Sir Toby and John Gielgud as Malvolio. The Old Vic Theatre was reopened in 1950 (after suffering severe damage in the London Blitz in 1941) with a memorable production starring Peggy Ashcroft as Viola. Gielgud directed a production at the Shakespeare Memorial Theatre with Laurence Olivier as Malvolio and Vivien Leigh playing both Viola and Sebastian in 1955. The longest-running Broadway production by far was Margaret Webster's 1940 staging starring Maurice Evans as Malvolio and Helen Hayes as Viola. It ran for 129 performances, more than twice as long as any other Broadway production.

A memorable production directed by Liviu Ciulei at the Guthrie Theater in Minneapolis in 1984 was set in the context of an archetypal circus world, emphasising the play's convivial, carnivalesque tone. (Note: The production was extensively reviewed by Clayton)

When the play was first performed, all female parts were played by men or boys, but it has been the practice for some centuries now to cast women or girls in the female parts in all plays. In 1999 and 2007 Propeller produced the play with an all-male cast, at the Old Vic, and on tour internationally and in the UK. The company of Shakespeare's Globe, London, has produced many notable, highly popular all-male performances, and a highlight of their 2012 season was Twelfth Night, with the Globe's artistic director Mark Rylance playing Olivia. This season was preceded, in February, by a performance of the play by the same company at Middle Temple Hall, to celebrate the 400th anniversary of the play's première, at the same venue. Stephen Fry played Malvolio when the same production was revived in 2012–13, later transferring to sell-out runs in the West End and Broadway; it ran in repertory with Richard III.

Many renowned actresses have played Viola in the latter half of the 20th century, and their performances been interpreted in the light of how far they allow the audience to experience the transgression of stereotypical gender roles. This has sometimes correlated with how far productions of the play go towards reaffirming a sense of unification; for example, a 1947 production concentrated on showing a post-World War II community reuniting at the end of the play, led by a robust hero / heroine in Viola, played by Beatrix Lehmann, then 44 years old. The 1966 Royal Shakespeare Company production played on gender transgressions more obviously, with Diana Rigg as Viola showing much more physical attraction towards the duke than previously seen, and the court in general being a more physically demonstrative place, particularly between males. John Barton's 1969 production starred Donald Sinden as Malvolio and Judi Dench as Viola; their performances were highly acclaimed and the production as a whole was said to show a society crumbling into decay.

Malvolio is a popular character choice among stage actors; he has been portrayed by Ian Holm many times, Simon Russell Beale (Donmar Warehouse, 2002), Richard Cordery (2005), Patrick Stewart, (Chichester, 2007), Derek Jacobi (Donmar Warehouse, 2009), Richard Wilson (2009), and Stephen Fry (The Globe, 2012).

In 2017, the Royal National Theatre's production of Twelfth Night changed some of the roles from male to female, including Feste, Fabian (who became Fabia), and, most notably, Malvolio – who became Malvolia – played by Tamsin Greig to largely positive reviews. As a result, the production played with sexuality as well as gender.

In 2017–18, the Royal Shakespeare Company staged a production directed by Christopher Luscombe; Adrian Edmondson played Malvolio, Kara Tointon Olivia, and Dinita Gohil Viola.

In 2022, Old Fruit Jar Productions staged a 1980s-inspired twist on the play at Royal Court Theatre, Liverpool, swapping lords and ladies of stately homes for rowdy Benidorm bars and booze-fuelled escapades, as an introduction to Shakespeare for audiences unfamiliar with his work.

The St. Louis Shakespeare Festival presented Twelfth Night in 2023 as part of its annual Shakespeare in the Park series in Forest Park. Directed by Lisa Portes, the production reimagined the play in a contemporary Miami-inspired setting, with Viola and Sebastian portrayed as Cuban refugees. Featuring a predominantly Latiné cast, including Gabriela Saker as Viola and Felipe Carrasco as Orsino, the production incorporated live music and a vibrant, Latin-inflected aesthetic. The staging was noted for its culturally specific reinterpretation and its emphasis on themes of migration, identity, and community, attracting large audiences during the festival’s 23rd season.

In 2025, the Public Theater staged Twelfth Night directed by Saheem Ali at the Delacourte Theater. This production starred Lupita Nyong'o as Viola, Sandra Oh as Olivia, and Peter Dinklage as Malvolio. This production was later filmed for PBS' Great Performances. The episode aired on 14 November, 2025.

In 2026, a production was directed by Jolene Gentzler at Class Act Productions also known as CAP Theatre in Altoona Iowa. It features many talented people like the Technical Director: Joseph Gentzler and the ADSM: Jocelyn Hamel. Along with 17 actors and 2-3 people in the Tech Booth, Twelfth Night is CAP Theatre's "2026 CAP Classic". Usually the CAP Classic is a Shakesperean play that they do every summer. Which play they do changes every year however. Last year they did Shakespeares "A Midsummer Nights Dream".

== Adaptations ==
=== Stage ===
==== Musicals ====
Due to its themes such as young women seeking independence in a "man's world", "gender bending" and "same sex attraction", there have been a number of re-workings for the stage, particularly in musical theatre, among them Your Own Thing (1968), Music Is (1977), All Shook Up (2005), and Play On! (1997), the last two jukebox musicals featuring the music of Elvis Presley and Duke Ellington, respectively. Another adaptation is Illyria (2002) by composer Pete Mills, which continues to perform regularly throughout the United States. In 2018, the Public Theatre workshopped and premiered a musical adaptation of Twelfth Night with original music by Shaina Taub, who also played the role of Feste. In 1999, the play was adapted as Epiphany by the Takarazuka Revue, adding more overt commentary on the role of theatre and actors, as well as gender as applied to the stage (made more layered by the fact that all roles in this production were played by women). There are many new modern plays but mostly still played in Early Modern English.

==== Plays ====
Theatre Grottesco, a Lecocq-inspired company based out of Santa Fe, New Mexico, created a modern version of the play from the point of view of the servants working for Duke Orsino and Lady Olivia, entitled Grottesco's 12th Night (2008). The adaptation takes a much deeper look at the issues of classism, and society without leadership. In New York City, Turn to Flesh Productions, a theatre company that specializes in creating "new Shakespeare shows", developed two plays focused on Malvolio: A Comedy of Heirors, or The Imposters by verse playwright, Emily C. A. Snyder, which imagined a disgraced Malvolio chasing down two pairs of female twins in Syracuse and Ephesus, and Malvolio's Revenge by verse playwright, Duncan Pflaster, a queer sequel to Twelfth Night. Both plays were originally written for submission to the American Shakespeare Center's call for plays in conversation with the Bard through the Shakespeare's New Contemporaries program.

=== Film ===
- 1910: Vitagraph Studios released the silent, short adaptation Twelfth Night starring actors Florence Turner, Julia Swayne Gordon, and Marin Sais.
- 1985: Just One of the Guys, directed by Lisa Gottlieb, is a loose update of the story set in a modern high school.
- 1986: Twelfth Night, an Australian production.
- 1996: Twelfth Night, Or What You Will, adapted and directed by Trevor Nunn and set in the 19th century, stars Imogen Stubbs as Viola, Helena Bonham Carter as Olivia, and Toby Stephens as Duke Orsino. The film also features Mel Smith as Sir Toby, Richard E. Grant as Sir Andrew, Ben Kingsley as Feste, Imelda Staunton as Maria, and Nigel Hawthorne as Malvolio. Much of the comic material was downplayed into straightforward drama, and the film received some criticism for this.
- 1998: Shakespeare in Love contains several references to Twelfth Night. "Viola" (Gwyneth Paltrow) is the daughter of a wealthy merchant who disguises herself as a boy to become an actor. Near the end of the movie, Elizabeth I (Judi Dench) asks Shakespeare (Joseph Fiennes) to write a comedy for the Twelfth Night holiday. Viola is presented in the final scene of the film as Shakespeare's inspiration for the heroine of Twelfth Night. In a nod to the shipwrecked opening of the play, the movie includes a scene where the character Viola, separated from her love by an arranged marriage and bound for the American colonies, survives a shipwreck and comes ashore to Virginia.
- 2001: Disney Channel Original Movie Motocrossed sets the story in the world of motocross racing.
- 2004: Wicker Park has Rose Byrne's character Alex play Viola in an amateur production of Twelfth Night.
- 2006: She's the Man updates the story as a contemporary teenage comedy. It is set in a prep school named Illyria and incorporates the names of the play's major characters. The story was changed to revolve around the idea of soccer rivalry but the twisted character romance remained the same as the original. Viola, the main character, pretends to be her brother Sebastian, and a girl named Olivia falls in love with her in this guise. Two of Duke's Illyria soccer teammates are named Andrew and Toby. A nod is given to the omitted subplot by naming a briefly-onscreen tarantula Malvolio. Sebastian's ex-girlfriend Monique was given the surname Valentine, the meddling Malcolm was given the surname Festes, and Viola's friend and hair stylist Paul was given the surname Antonio.
- 2018: Adam Smethurst adapted and directed this version set in the 21st century. The film stars Sheila Atim as Viola and Sebastian, Dominic Coleman as Sir Andrew Aguecheek, Zackary Momoh as Antonio, and Simon Nagra as Sir Toby Belch.

=== Television ===
On 14 May 1937, the BBC Television Service in London broadcast a thirty-minute excerpt of the play, the first known instance of a work of Shakespeare being performed on television. Produced for the new medium by George More O'Ferrall, the production is also notable for having featured a young actress who would later go on to win an Academy Award – Greer Garson. As the performance was transmitted live from the BBC's studios at Alexandra Palace and the technology to record television programmes did not at the time exist, no visual record survives other than still photographs.

The entire play was produced for television in 1939, directed by Michel Saint-Denis and starring another future Oscar-winner, Peggy Ashcroft. The part of Sir Toby Belch was taken by a young George Devine.

In 1957, another adaptation of the play was presented by NBC on U.S. television's Hallmark Hall of Fame, with Maurice Evans recreating his performance as Malvolio. This was the first colour version ever produced on TV. Dennis King, Rosemary Harris, and Frances Hyland co-starred.

In 1964, there was a Canadian TV version directed by George McCowan with Martha Henry as Viola, then in 1966 there was an Australian TV version.

Another version for UK television was produced in 1969, directed by John Sichel and John Dexter. The production featured Joan Plowright as Viola and Sebastian, Alec Guinness as Malvolio, Ralph Richardson as Sir Toby Belch, and Tommy Steele as an unusually prominent Feste.

Yet another TV adaptation followed in 1980. This version was part of the BBC Television Shakespeare series and featured Felicity Kendal in the role of Viola, Sinéad Cusack as Olivia, Alec McCowen as Malvolio, and Robert Hardy as Sir Toby Belch.

In 1988, Kenneth Branagh's stage production of the play, starring Frances Barber as Viola and Richard Briers as Malvolio, was adapted for Thames Television.

In 1998 the Lincoln Center Theater production directed by Nicholas Hytner was broadcast on PBS Live from Lincoln Center. It starred Helen Hunt as Viola, Paul Rudd as Orsino, Kyra Sedgwick as Olivia, Philip Bosco as Malvolio, Brian Murray as Sir Toby, Max Wright as Sir Andrew, and David Patrick Kelly as Feste.

A 2003 tele-movie adapted and directed by Tim Supple is set in the present day. It features David Troughton as Sir Toby, and is notable for its multi-ethnic cast including Parminder Nagra as Viola and Chiwetel Ejiofor as Orsino. Its portrayal of Viola and Sebastian's arrival in Illyria is reminiscent of news footage of asylum seekers.

An episode of the British series Skins, entitled Grace, featured the main characters playing Twelfth Night, with a love triangle between Franky, Liv and Matty, who respectively played Viola, Olivia, and Orsino.

=== Radio ===
An adaptation of Twelfth Night by Cathleen Nesbitt for the BBC was the first complete Shakespeare play ever broadcast on British radio. This occurred on 28 May 1923, with Nesbitt as both Viola and Sebastian, and Gerald Lawrence as Orsino.

In 1937, an adaptation was performed on the CBS Radio Playhouse starring Orson Welles as Orsino and Tallulah Bankhead as Viola. A year later, Welles played Malvolio in a production with his Mercury Theater Company.

There have been several full adaptations on BBC Radio. A 1982 BBC Radio 4 broadcast featured Alec McCowen as Orsino, Wendy Murray as Viola, Norman Rodway as Sir Toby Belch, Andrew Sachs as Sir Andrew Aguecheek, and Bernard Hepton as Malvolio; in 1993, BBC Radio 3 broadcast a version of the play (set on a Caribbean Island), with Michael Maloney as Orsino, Eve Matheson as Viola, Iain Cuthbertson as Malvolio, and Joss Ackland as Sir Toby Belch; this adaptation was broadcast again on 6 January 2011 by BBC Radio 7 (now Radio 4 Extra). 1998 saw another Radio 3 adaptation, with Michael Maloney, again as Orsino, Josette Simon as Olivia and Nicky Henson as Feste. In April 2012, BBC Radio 3 broadcast a version directed by Sally Avens, with Paul Ready as Orsino, Naomi Frederick as Viola, David Tennant as Malvolio, and Ron Cook as Sir Toby Belch.

=== Music ===
Operas based on Twelfth Night include Bedřich Smetana's unfinished Viola (1874, 1883–1884), Karel Weis's Blíženci (1892, 2nd version 1917), Ivan Jirko's Večer tříkrálový (1964), Jan Klusák's Dvanáctá noc (1989), and Edward Lambert's Twelfth Night (2025).

A stage music based on Twelfth Night was composed in 1907 by Engelbert Humperdinck, famous for his fairy-tale opera "Hänsel und Gretel".

Overtures based on Twelfth Night have been composed by Alexander Campbell Mackenzie (1888); Mario Castelnuovo-Tedesco, and Johan Wagenaar.

"O Mistress Mine" (Act II, Scene 3) has been set to music as a solo song by many composers, including Thomas Morley (also arranged by Percy Grainger, 1903); Arthur Sullivan (1866); Hubert Parry (1886); Charles Villiers Stanford (1896); Amy Beach (1897); R. H. Walthew (1898); W. Augustus Barratt (1903); Roger Quilter (1905); Samuel Coleridge-Taylor (1906); Benjamin Dale (1919); Peter Warlock (1924); Arthur Somervell (1927); Cecil Armstrong Gibbs (1936); Gerald Finzi (1942); Erich Korngold (1943); Peter Racine Fricker (1961); Sven-Eric Johanson (1974); Jaakko Mäntyjärvi (1984); Dave Matthews (2014); Paul Kelly (2016); David Barton (2019). Other settings for mixed voices have been composed by Herbert Brewer and Herbert Murrill amongst others.

"Come Away, Come Away, Death" (Act II, Scene 4) has been set to music by composers Johannes Brahms (in a German translation by August Schlegel as "Lied von Shakespeare", the second of Four Songs for Female Choir, Op. 17, in 1860), Gerald Finzi (1942), Erich Korngold (1943), Roger Quilter, and Jean Sibelius (in a Swedish translation as "Kom nu hit", 1957).

In 1943, Korngold also set the songs "Adieu, Good Man Devil" (Act IV, Scene 2), "Hey, Robin" (Act IV, Scene 2), and "For the Rain, It Raineth Every Day" (Act V, Scene 1) as the song cycle Narrenlieder, Op. 29.

== Influence ==
The play consistently ranks among the greatest plays ever written and has been dubbed "The Perfect Comedy". The Danish philosopher Søren Kierkegaard opens his 1844 book Philosophical Fragments with the quote "Better well hanged than ill wed", a paraphrase of Feste's comment to Maria in Act 1, Scene 5: "Many a good hanging prevents a bad marriage". Nietzsche also refers passingly to Twelfth Night (specifically, to Sir Andrew Aguecheek's suspicion, expressed in Act 1, Scene 3, that his excessive intake of beef is having an inverse effect on his wit) in the third essay of his Genealogy of Morality.

Agatha Christie's 1940 mystery novel Sad Cypress draws its title from a song in Act II, Scene IV of Twelfth Night.

The protagonists of Vita Sackville-West's 1930 novel The Edwardians are named Sebastian and Viola, and are brother and sister. In her introduction to the novel, Victoria Glendinning writes: "Sebastian is the boy-heir that Vita would like to have been... Viola is very like the girl that Vita actually was."

American playwright Ken Ludwig wrote a play inspired by the details of Twelfth Night, called Leading Ladies.

Cassandra Clare's 2009 novel City of Glass contains chapter names inspired by quotations of Antonio and Sebastian.

British Neoprog band Twelfth Night is named after the play.

Two of the dogs in the film Hotel for Dogs are twins called Sebastian and Viola.

Clive Barker's short story "Sex, Death and Starshine" revolves around a doomed production of Twelfth Night.

The Baker Street Irregulars believe Sherlock Holmes's birthday to be 6 January due to the fact that Holmes quotes twice from Twelfth Night whereas he quotes only once from other Shakespeare plays.

Characters in Shirley Jackson's 1959 novel, The Haunting of Hill House, frequently quote Feste's song, O Mistress Mine. More specifically, the line "journeys end in lovers meeting" repeats throughout the text, spoken most frequently by Eleanor.

The Kiddy Grade characters Viola and Cesario are named for Viola and her alter ego Cesario.

Elizabeth Hand's novella Illyria features a high school production of Twelfth Night, containing many references to the play, especially Feste's song.

The 2006 romantic comedy She's the Man is loosely based on Twelfth Night.

One of Club Penguin's plays, Twelfth Fish, is a spoof of Shakespeare's works. It is a story about a countess, a jester, and a bard who catch a fish that talks. As the play ends, they begin eating the fish. Many of the lines are parodies of Shakespeare.

Sara Farizan's 2014 young adult novel "Tell Me Again How A Crush Should Feel" features a high school production of the play, where the "new girl" Saskia plays Viola/Cesario and catches the attention of the main character, Leila.

Vidyadhar Gokhale's play Madanachi Manjiri (मदनाची मंजिरी) is an adaptation of Twelfth Night.

== Awards and nominations ==
=== 1998 Broadway revival ===
Year	Award	Category	Nominee	Result
1999	Tony Awards	Best Revival of a Play		Nominated
1999	Tony Awards	Best Original Score	Jeanine Tesori	Nominated
1999	Tony Awards	Best Scenic Design	Bob Crowley	Nominated
1999	Tony Awards	Best Costume Design	Catherine Zuber	Nominated
1999	Tony Awards	Best Lighting Design	Natasha Katz	Nominated
1999	Drama Desk Award	Outstanding Music in a Play	Jeanine Tesori	Won
1999	Drama Desk Award	Outstanding Scenic Design of a Play	Bob Crowley	Nominated
1999	Drama Desk Award	Outstanding Costume Design	Catherine Zuber	Nominated
1999	Drama Desk Award	Outstanding Lighting Design	Natasha Katz	Nominated

=== 2002 London revival ===
Year	Award	Category	Nominee	Result
2003	Laurence Olivier Awards	Best Revival		Won
2003	Laurence Olivier Awards	Best Actor	Mark Rylance	Nominated
2003	Laurence Olivier Awards	Best Performance in a Supporting Role	Mark Strong	Nominated
2003	Laurence Olivier Awards	Best Director	Sam Mendes	Won
2003	Laurence Olivier Awards	Best Costume Design	Jenny Tiramani	Won

=== 2008 West End revival ===
Year	Award	Category	Nominee	Result
2009	Laurence Olivier Award	Best Actor	Derek Jacobi	Won
2009	Laurence Olivier Award	Best Costume Design	Christopher Oram	Nominated

=== 2013 Broadway revival ===
Year	Award	Category	Nominee	Result
2014	Tony Awards	Best Revival of a Play		Nominated
2014	Tony Awards	Best Actor in a Play	Samuel Barnett	Nominated
2014	Tony Awards	Best Featured Actor in a Play	Paul Chahidi	Nominated
2014	Tony Awards	Best Featured Actor in a Play	Stephen Fry	Nominated
2014	Tony Awards	Best Featured Actor in a Play	Mark Rylance	Won
2014	Tony Awards	Best Direction of a Play	Tim Carroll	Nominated
2014	Tony Awards	Best Costume Design of a Play	Jenny Tiramani	Won
2014	Drama Desk Award	Outstanding Revival of a Play		Won
2014	Drama Desk Award	Outstanding Direction of a Play	Tim Carroll	Won
2014	Drama Desk Award	Outstanding Costume Design	Jenny Tiramani	Nominated
2014	Theatre World Award		Paul Chahidi	Won

== See also ==
- List of idioms attributed to Shakespeare
