= Sebastian (Twelfth Night) =

Character in Twelfth Night

- Twelfth Night character
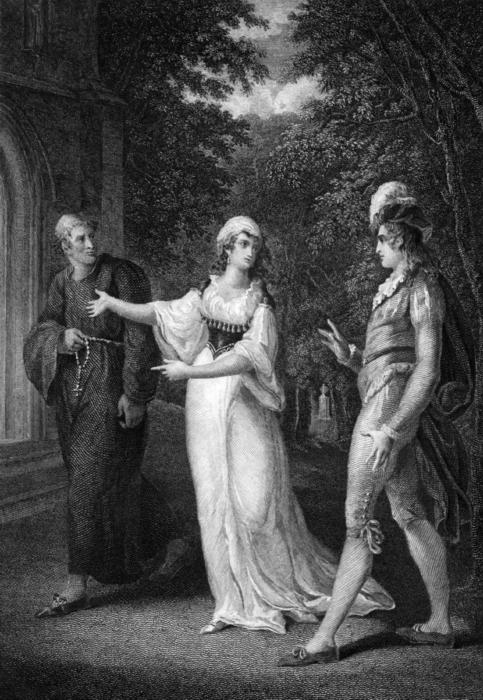
- A Priest, Olivia, and Sebastian
- Created by: William Shakespeare

Sebastian is one of the main characters from William Shakespeare's play Twelfth Night, believed to have been written around 1600 or 1601.

== Background ==
Sebastian is the twin brother of Viola. After the beginning of the play, Viola mentions that her brother Sebastian is drowned in the sea.

The next appearance of Sebastian denies this, as he has been rescued by Antonio, a sea captain who looks after Sebastian at some risk to himself. After three months with Antonio, Sebastian decides to set out to Illyria, ruled by Duke Orsino. Meanwhile, Viola has disguised herself as a male page named Cesario and works for the Duke. A love triangle situation ensues, where the Duke is in love with Countess Olivia, Viola falls in love with the Duke, and Olivia falls in love with Viola, thinking she is a man.

Because they look so much alike, when Olivia sees Sebastian later, after he has not backed down from a challenge by Sir Andrew Aguecheek, she thinks he is "Cesario". She asks him to marry her, to which Sebastian agrees. When Olivia and Sebastian are wed, Antonio's romantic-like love is left unrequited. When Viola appears with the duke, the siblings are reunited and the Duke resolves to marry Viola.

== Character interpretation ==
Sebastian's character is necessary to allow Viola to unravel the roles she has accumulated in the play, and to allow her to return to being a woman, and allowing her to marry Orsino. Sebastian also has a part of his own; later on he marries Countess Olivia, whom Orsino had previously loved.

== Film representations ==
- Twelfth Night (1910) – Directed by Eugene Mullin – Sebastian: Edith Storey
- Twelfth Night (1939) – Directed by Michel Saint Denis – Sebastian: Basil Langton
- Twelfth Night (1957) [TV] – Directed by David Greene – Sebastian: Denholm Elliott
- Twelfth Night (1957) – Directed by Caspar Wrede – Sebastian: Nicholas Amer
- Twelfth Night (1969) – Directed by John Sichel – Sebastian: Joan Plowright
- Twelfth Night (1974) – Directed by David Giles – Sebastian: Sylvester Morand
- Twelfth Night (1980) [TV] – Directed by John Gorrie – Viola: Michael Thomas
- Twelfth Night (1987) – Directed by Neil Armfield – Sebastian: Gillian Jones
- Twelfth Night or What You Will (1988) – Directed by Kenneth Branagh of the Royal Shakespeare Company/produced for television by Thames Television – Sebastian: Christopher Hollis
- Twelfth Night (1992) – [Animated Tales] – Directed by Mariya Muat – Sebastian: Hugh Grant
- Twelfth Night (1996) – Directed by Trevor Nunn – Sebastian: Steven Mackintosh
- Twelfth Night, or What You Will (1998) [TV] – Directed by Nicholas Hytner – Sebastian: Rick Stear
- Twelfth Night, or What You Will (2003) – Directed by Tim Supple – Sebastian: Ronny Jhutti
- She's the Man (2006) – Directed by Andy Fickman – Sebastian Hastings: James Kirk (Inspired by Twelfth Night)
- Twelfth Night (2018) – Directed by Adam Smethurst – Sebastian: Sheila Atim

== Sources ==
- Guide to Twelfth Night
- Google books Shakespeare's Twelfth Night, or What You Will
