= Sir Toby Belch =

Character in Twelfth Night

- Twelfth Night character
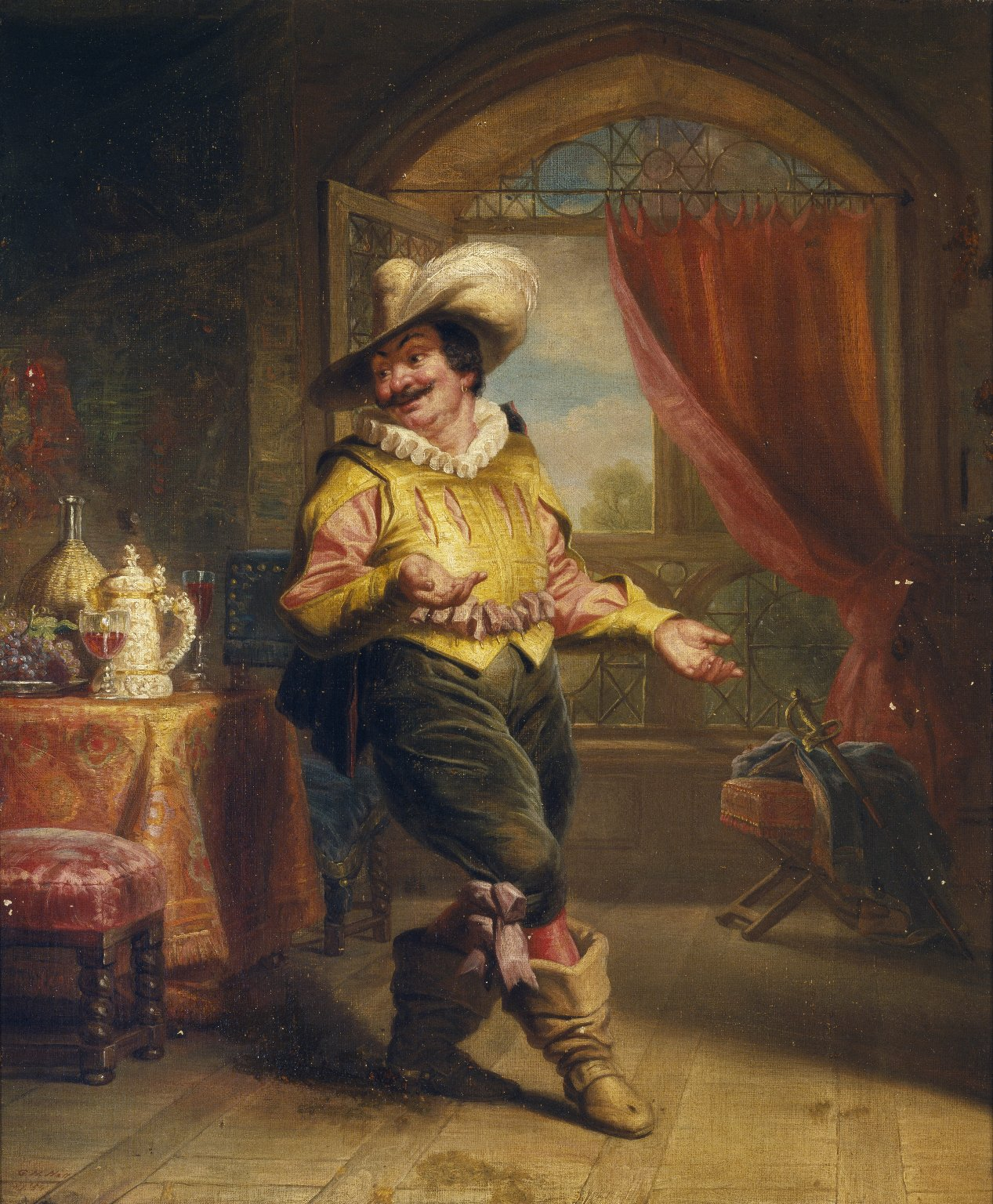
- Oil painting of Sir Toby Belch by the American artist George Henry Hall
- Created by: William Shakespeare

In-universe information
- Affiliation: Sir Andrew Aguecheek
- Family: Olivia (niece)

Sir Toby Belch is a character in William Shakespeare's Twelfth Night. He is Olivia's uncle.

== Character ==
Sir Toby is an ambiguous mix of high spirits and low cunning. He first appears in the play's third scene, when he storms onto the stage the morning after a hard night out, complaining about the sombre melancholy that hangs over his niece's household. "What a plague means my niece to take the death of her brother thus? I'm sure care's an enemy to life." This immediately establishes Sir Toby at the opposite pole from the languishing melancholy which dominated the first scene (including Orsino's speech, "If music be the food of love..."), identifying him as a force for vitality, noise and good cheer, as his name suggests.

At the beginning Sir Toby appears to be friends with another character, Sir Andrew Aguecheek, a guest of Olivia, Sir Toby's niece. However, as the play progresses, it transpires that Sir Toby is just taking advantage of Sir Andrew's riches.

His tormenting of the steward Malvolio is similarly double-edged in its tone of "sportful malice" (V,1). The plot against Malvolio is generally considered a comic highlight of the play, but critics have often complained of its cruelty. The play ends with the quarrel still unresolved, and Olivia warning that Malvolio "hath been most notoriously abused" (V,1).

Though he taunts Malvolio with the demand "Art any more than a steward?" (II,3), he only does so after Malvolio has threatened him with being turned out if he doesn't reform his ways. Indeed, part of Malvolio's complaint is that Sir Toby and his companions are not acting like noblemen by drinking and singing, but like "tinkers" in an "alehouse". His appreciation of Maria, though couched in terms that might not please every woman: "She's a beagle, true-bred" (II,3), and eventual marriage, shows that he thinks his title of no particular account compared to his love for her. He is older than Maria. He is also in his forties.

== See also ==
- Characters in Twelfth Night
- Characters in Works of Shakespeare
