= Twelfth Night (ITV Sunday Night Theatre) =

1970 British TV play

- ITV Sunday Night Theatre episode
- Episode no.: Series 2 Episode 44
- Directed by: John Sichel
- Based on: Twelfth Night by William Shakespeare
- Original air date: 1970

"Twelfth Night" is a 1970 British TV adaptation of the play Twelfth Night by William Shakespeare. It was directed by John Sichel and broadcast as the 44th episode of second season of ITV Sunday Night Theatre. The score was composed by Marc Wilkinson.

== Main cast ==
- Tommy Steele as Feste
- Ralph Richardson as Sir Toby Belch
- Alec Guinness as Malvolio
- Joan Plowright as Viola/Sebastian
- Gary Raymond as Orsino
- Adrienne Corri as Olivia
- John Moffatt as Sir Andrew Aguecheek
- Sheila Reid as Maria
- Riggs O'Hara as Fabian
- Richard Leech as Antonio
- Kurt Christian as Curio
- Christopher Timothy as Valentine
