= Maria (Twelfth Night) =

Character in Shakespeare play

Maria the servant
- Twelfth Night by William Shakespeare character
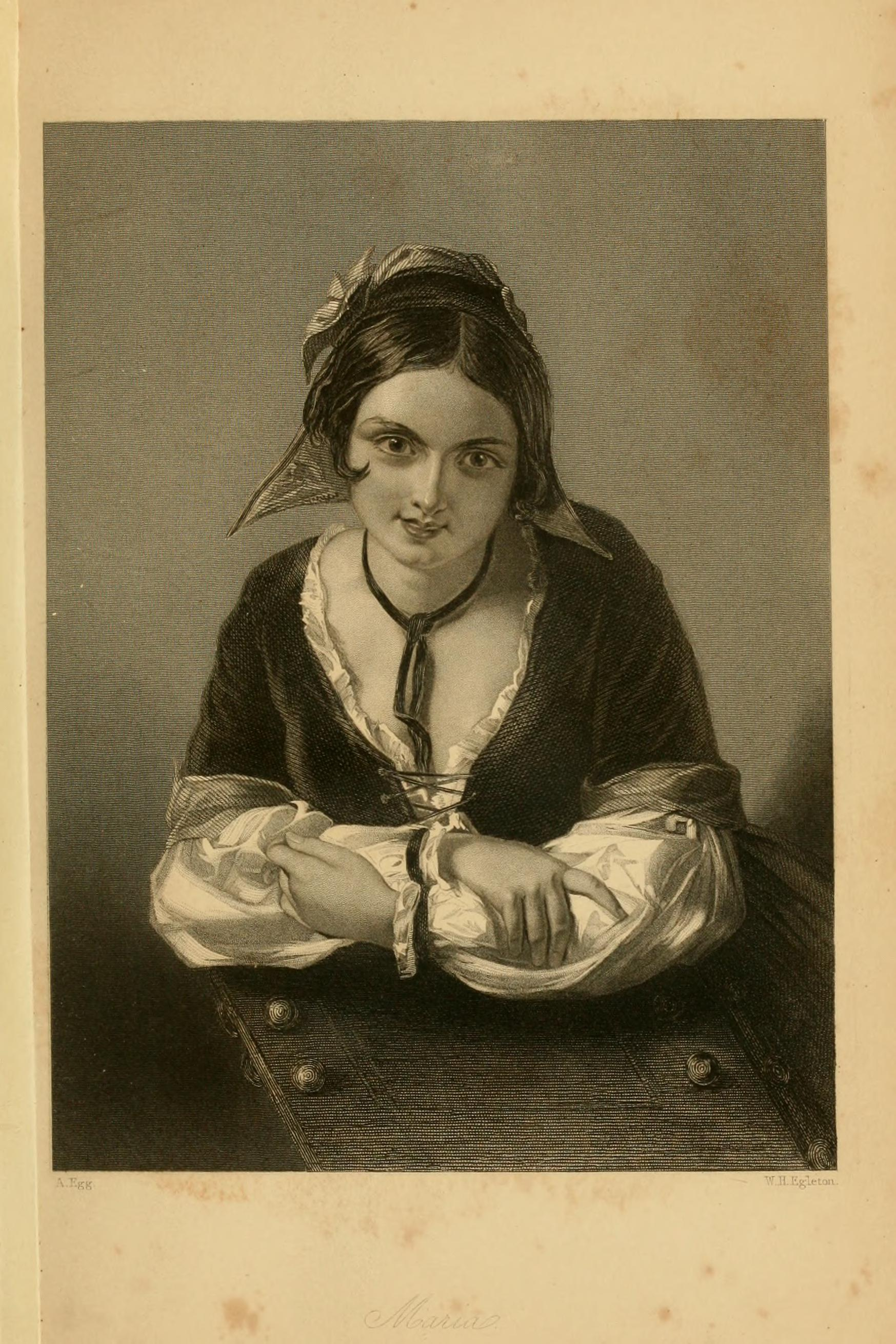
- Maria, Augustus Egg (c.1849)
- Created by: William Shakespeare

Maria is a fictional character in the play Twelfth Night by William Shakespeare. She is a servant in Olivia's household. Maria is shown to have a friendly relationship with Sir Toby Belch, and exhibits a witty attitude. Maria also forges a love letter to Malvolio which results in Malvolio being confined to a dark room (a treatment for madness). In the end of the play, this relationship with Sir Toby Belch ultimately leads to their marriage.

== Connections with other characters ==
- Maria is Olivia's personal house-maid
- Sir Toby Belch is Olivia's uncle
- Malvolio is the steward in Olivia's household and therefore Maria's superior

== Performers ==
Year	Media	Performer
1869	Broadway	Fannie Davenport
1905	Broadway	Zeffie Tilbury
1910	Film	Marin Sais
1939	Television	Lucille Lisle
1949	Broadway	Ruth Enders
1955	Film	Anna Lisyanskaya
1957	Television	Micheline Luccioni
1963	Off-Broadway	Peggy Pope
1969	Off-Broadway	Jennifer Darling
1970	Television	Raph Wolfs
1972	Television	Jet Naessens
1974	Television	Anne Stallybrass
1980	Television	Annette Crosbie
1987	Film	Tracy Harvey
1988	Television	Abigail McKern
1996	Film	Imelda Staunton
1999	Off-Broadway	Dana Slamp
2003	Television	Maureen Beattie
2009	Off-Broadway	Julie White
2012	Off-Broadway	Katie Alto
2013	London	Paul Chahidi
