= Malvolio =

Character in Twelfth Night

- Twelfth Night character
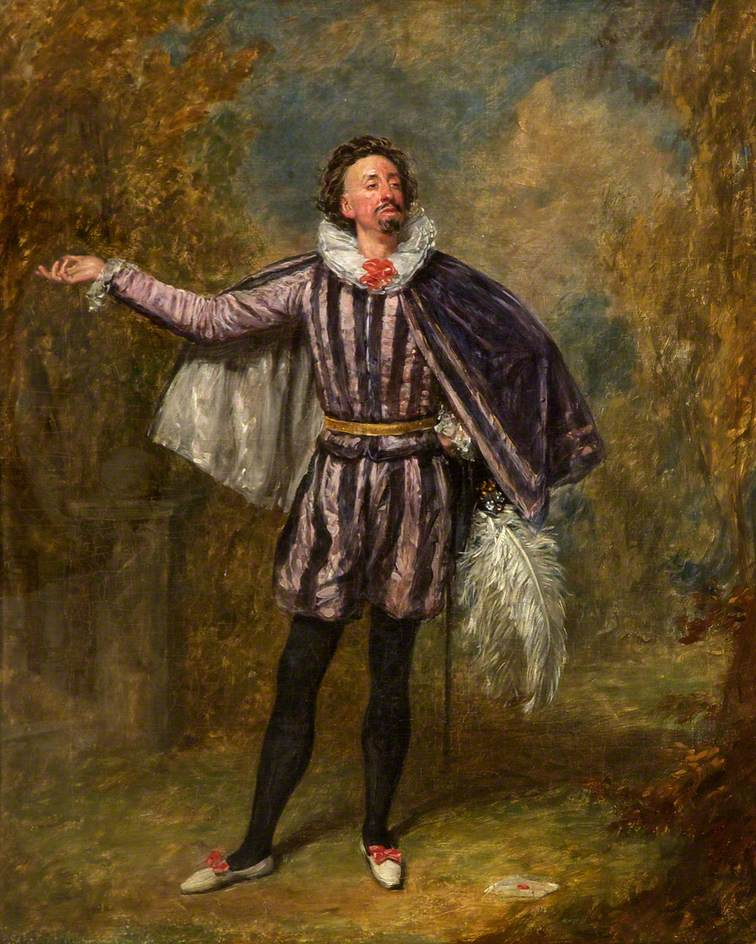
- William Pleater Davidge as Malvolio in Twelfth Night at the Theatre Royal, Bath (c. 1846). Painting by Henry Andrews.
- First appearance: Twelfth Night; c. 1601–02
- Created by: William Shakespeare
- Based on: Thomas Posthumous Hoby (possibly)
- Portrayed by: Richard Burbage; Vasili Merkuryev; Donald McDonald; Alec Guinness; Alec McCowen; Peter Cummins; Richard Briers; Gerald James; Nigel Hawthorne; Tamsin Greig; Stephen Fry; Derek Jacobi; Ken Dodd; Les Dennis; Samuel West

In-universe information
- Gender: Male
- Occupation: Steward
- Significant other: Olivia
- Religion: Puritan (Protestant)
- Nationality: Illyria

Malvolio is a fictional character in William Shakespeare's comedy Twelfth Night, or What You Will. The vain, pompous, authoritarian steward of Olivia's household, his name comes from Italian for 'ill will', referencing his disagreeable nature (cf. Benvolio from Romeo and Juliet).

== Style ==
In the play, Malvolio is defined as "a kind of Puritan". He has major conflicts with Sir Toby Belch, Sir Andrew Aguecheek, and Maria, mistress of the household.

Maria, Feste, Toby Belch, and Andrew Aguecheek torment Malvolio with drinking, joking, and singing. After Malvolio interrupts their party and chastises them for their lewdness, Maria devises a way to gain revenge on the steward, which she proposes to Sir Toby and the others. Maria composes a love letter in Olivia's handwriting, and leaves it so Malvolio will find it. Beforehand, Malvolio had been wishing to marry Olivia. The letter convinces Malvolio that Olivia loves him, and leads Malvolio to think that Olivia wishes him to smile, wear yellow stockings and cross garters. Olivia is in mourning for her brother's death, and finds smiling offensive; yellow is "a colour she abhors, and cross garters a fashion she detests", according to Maria. When Malvolio is imprisoned for being a supposed lunatic after acting out the instructions in the letter, Feste visits him both as himself and in the disguise of "Sir Topas the curate", and proceeds to torment Malvolio by refusing to think him sane no matter what he says. In his guise as the latter, he insists that Malvolio must follow the Pythagorean doctrine of reincarnation, something the steward claims to disapprove of. At the end of the play, Malvolio vows, "I'll be reveng'd on the whole pack of you" for his public humiliation, and Olivia acknowledges that he has "been most notoriously abused."

The role was first played by Richard Burbage at the Globe Theatre. John Marston observed that the actors of his time often played the role with "contemptuous superiority"; by contrast his favourite Malvolio, William Ferrin, performed it with "lofty condescension". Other actors known for their performance of Malvolio include Sir Alec Guinness, Henry Irving, E. H. Sothern, Herbert Beerbohm Tree, Henry Ainley, Sir John Gielgud, Simon Russell Beale, Maurice Evans, Ken Dodd, Richard Briers, Sir Nigel Hawthorne and Sir Derek Jacobi. Richard Wilson took on the role for the Royal Shakespeare Company's 2009 production. In 2012, Stephen Fry assumed the role at Shakespeare's Globe. In 2017, actress Tamsin Greig portrayed a female version of the character (renamed Malvolia) in Simon Godwin's revival of the play at the National Theatre. He was played by Les Dennis in 2024 at the Shakespeare North Playhouse. He was played by Peter Dinklage as part of Shakespeare in the Park, in the first play performed in the renovated Delacorte Theater.

== Inspiration ==
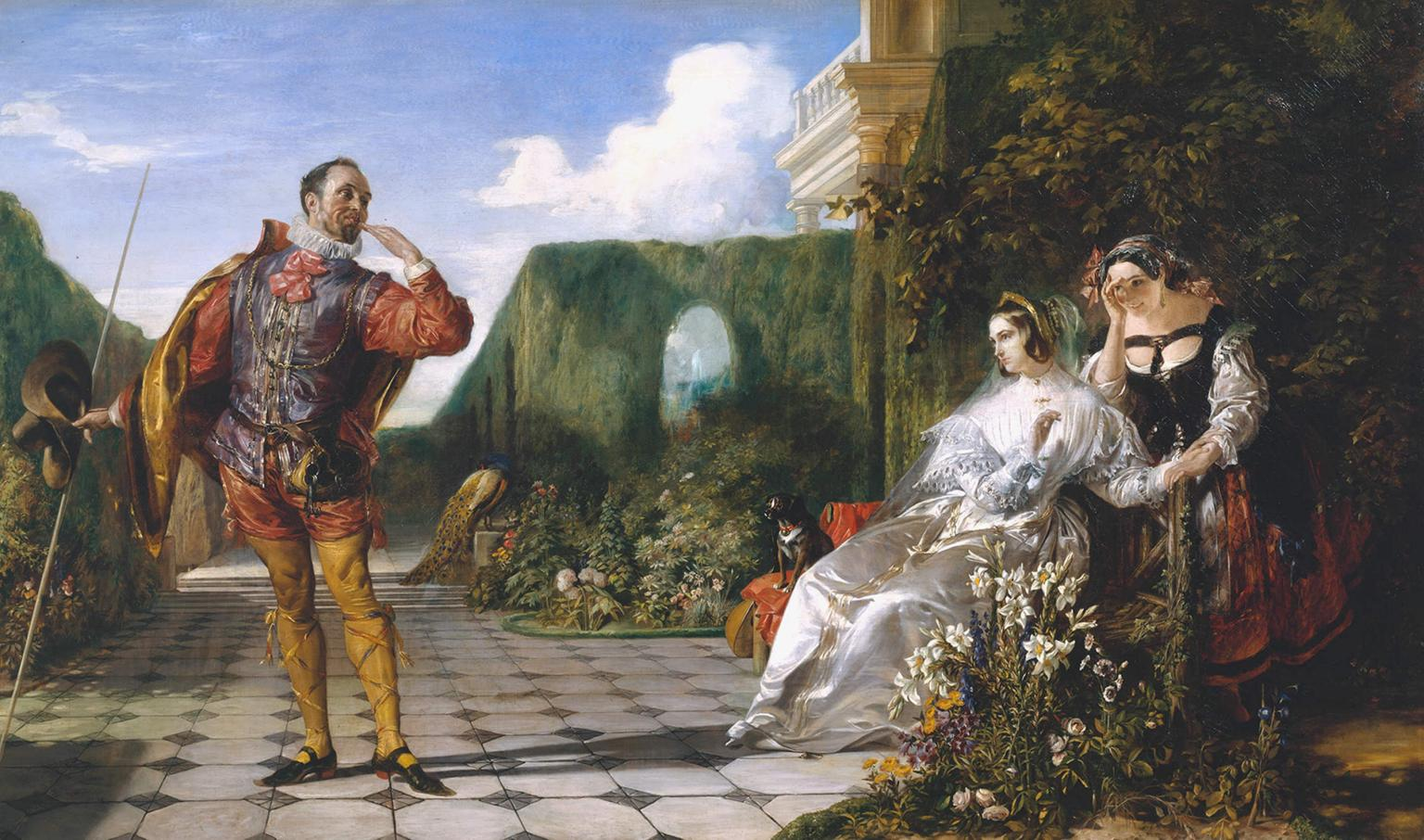
Scene from Twelfth Night - Malvolio and the Countess by 19th century artist Daniel Maclise

Some Shakespearean scholars hypothesize that the character Malvolio was inspired by Puritan landowner Sir Thomas Posthumous Hoby, who was involved in a well known court case against many of his Yorkshire neighbours in the 1600s. Hoby sued his neighbours when they came uninvited to his house, drank, played cards, mocked his religion, and threatened to rape his wife. Hoby won damages in the case, which may have influenced the scene in Twelfth Night when Malvolio interrupts Sir Toby's late-night reveling.

== Famous lines ==
- "[S]ome are born great, some achieve greatness, and some have greatness thrust upon 'em." (Act II, Scene V; although Malvolio says this, he does so while reading from the letter that Maria wrote).
- "By my life, this is my lady's hand. These be her very C's, her U's and her T's and thus makes she her great P's."
- "My masters, are you mad?"

The lines are later repeated, with a slight alteration, by Feste in the final scene of the play as he mocks Malvolio, who afterward storms off.
