= Olivia (Twelfth Night) =

Character in Twelfth Night

- Twelfth Night character
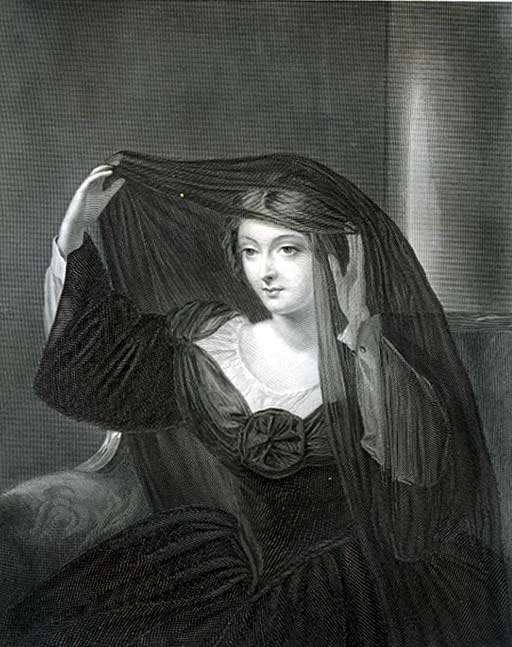
- Olivia in mourning
- Created by: William Shakespeare

Olivia is a fictional character from William Shakespeare's play Twelfth Night, believed to have been written around 1600 or 1601. She is at the centre of the various plots, both the comedic and the romantic. She has various suitors.

== Background ==
Olivia is a beautiful lady of noble birth who lives in Illyria. Before the play begins, she lost her brother, her guardian, after her father died. This loss has made her grief-stricken and she has refused to see anyone who does not reside in her household and declared that she will be in mourning for seven years (The element itself, till seven years' heat, Shall not behold her face at ample view).

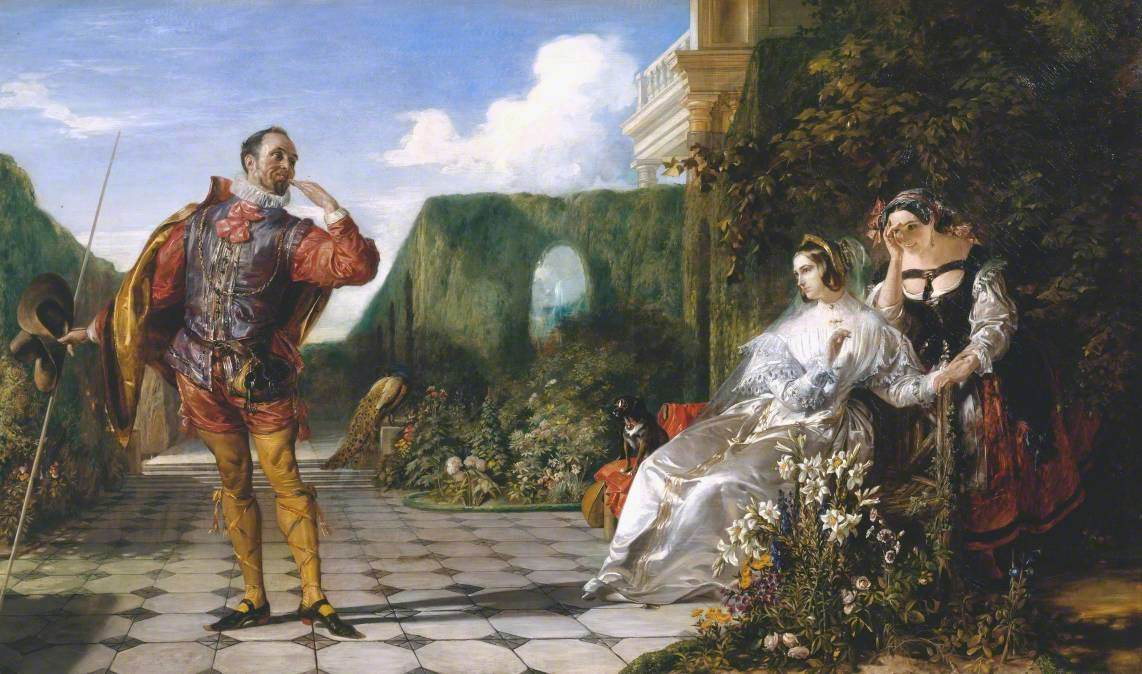
Malvolio and Olivia (Act 3, Scene 4)

Because of her wealth and beauty, Olivia attracts various men (Malvolio, Sir Andrew Aguecheek) who wish to marry her. The play begins with the Duke of Illyria, Orsino, pining away over his love for Olivia while she refuses to accept him as a suitor. Sir Andrew has been invited to her household by Sir Toby, and Andrew hopes to use his stay to make Olivia his bride. Malvolio uses his position as a steward to gain her affections.

Despite all of the rumpus going on at her home, Olivia refuses all visitors until Orsino sends his new page, the protagonist of the play, Viola, to call on her.

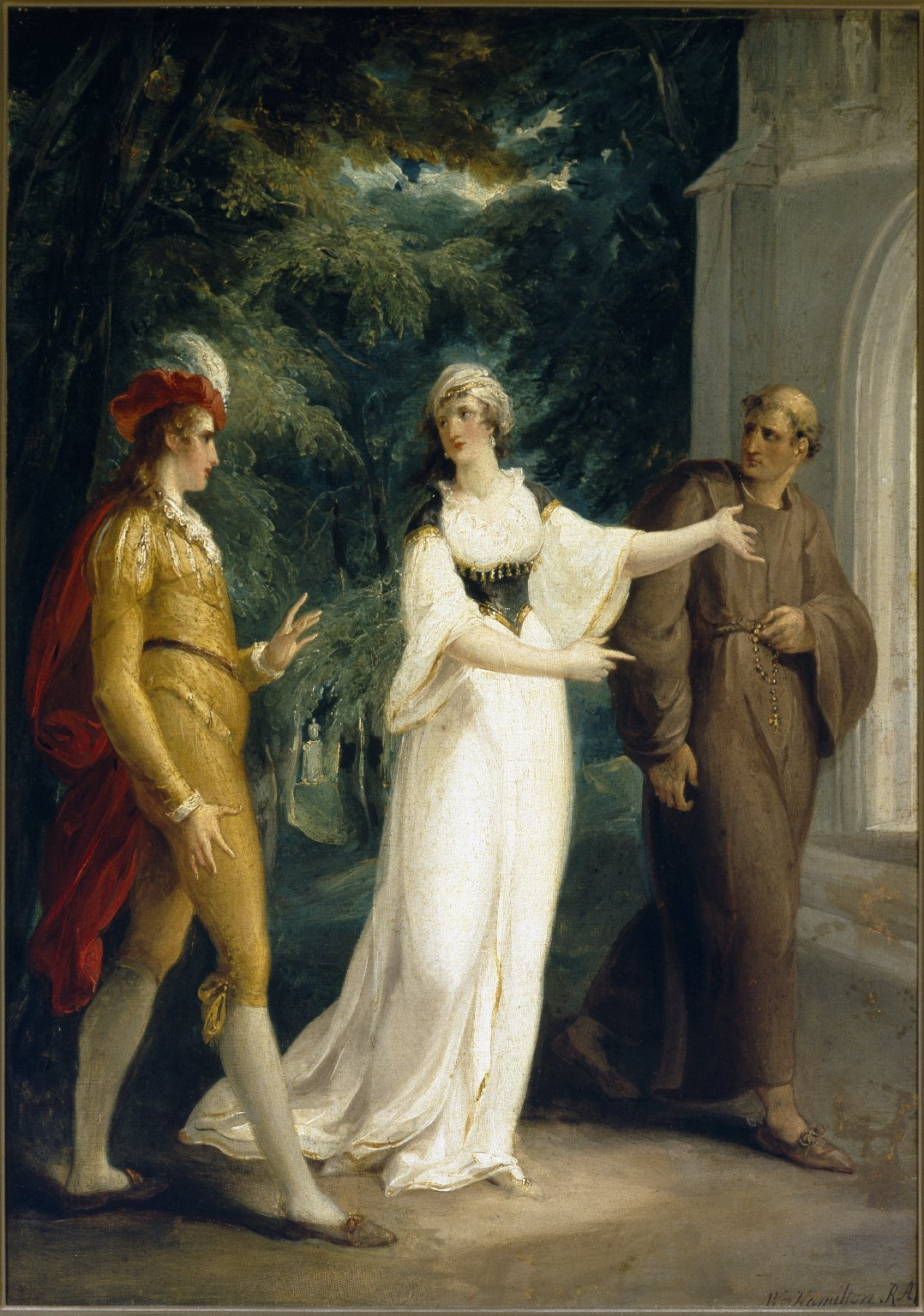
Sebastian, Olivia, and the Priest (Act 4, Scene 3)

Viola has been recently shipwrecked and she has taken on the disguise of a boy so that she may work for Orsino with no one knowing her true identity. During the shipwreck, Viola was separated from her brother, Sebastian, and she believes that he has died.

Olivia quickly falls in love with the witty Cesario (Viola's name when she is in disguise) because Cesario is unafraid of saying what they are thinking, even though Cesario never says anything nice to Olivia (except, of course, when speaking Orsino's messages). Cesario also compliments Olivia on her beauty, something that helps heal Olivia's heart from the losses she has recently incurred.

Olivia attempts to woo the young Cesario/Viola and repeatedly lures them to come back to her estate by using various tricks and problems. Olivia eventually concludes that she must marry him. However, in a case of mistaken identity, she marries Viola's twin brother, Sebastian, after a chance encounter with him. However, all ends well because Sebastian and his sister are extremely similar.

The climax of the play takes place at Olivia's estate. Here, Olivia and Sebastian are hastily married, Viola and Sebastian rediscover each other, Malvolio is rescued, and Orsino proposes to Viola.

== Depictions in film and on stage ==
One of Shakespeare's most popular plays, Twelfth Night has been produced for both the stage and film multiple times.

=== Stage ===
In 2009, Shakespeare in the Park put on a production starring Anne Hathaway as Viola and Audra McDonald as Olivia.

In 2014, Mark Rylance played the role in an all-male production in New York that ran in repertory with Richard III (in which Rylance played the title role). He won the Tony Award for Best Featured Actor in a Play for his performance as Olivia. He had previously played the role in 2002 and 2012 at Shakespeare's Globe in London.

In 2017/18, Kara Tointon played the role at the Royal Shakespeare Theatre in Stratford-upon-Avon.

=== Film ===
In the first film version of the play, made in 1910, Julia Swayne Gordon depicted Lady Olivia.

Helena Bonham Carter played Olivia in Trevor Nunn's film, Twelfth Night.

In 2006 the play was adapted into a modern retelling titled She's the Man, starring Amanda Bynes as Viola and Laura Ramsey as Olivia.

=== Radio ===
Helen Menken played the role of Olivia in a 1937 radio adaptation.

== Sources ==
- Guide to Twelfth Night
- Shakespeare's Twelfth Night, or What You Will
- Analysis of Major Characters in Twelfth Night
- Synopsis of Twelfth Night
- Summary of Twelfth Night and Characters
