= Sir Andrew Aguecheek =

Character in Twelfth Night

- Twelfth Night character
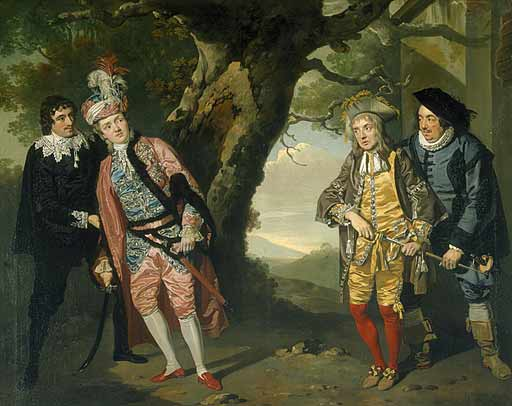
- Sir Andrew, at right in the red stockings, during the third act
- Created by: William Shakespeare

Sir Andrew Aguecheek is a fictional character in William Shakespeare's play Twelfth Night, or What You Will. One of the supporting characters, Sir Andrew is a stereotypical fool, who is goaded into unwisely duelling with Cesario and who is slowly having his money pilfered by Sir Toby Belch. He is dim-witted, vain and clownish. His role in the play not only provides comedy through his pathetic situation and his long speech, but also by his distinct, long-faced appearance and garish dress sense. The role has been a favourite for actors and has been performed by Alec Guinness, Christopher Plummer, Paul Scofield and Roger Rees.

== Background and character ==
Sir Andrew first appears in the third scene of Act I, as the so-called friend of Sir Toby Belch. Sir Andrew is a guest at the home of Sir Toby's niece Lady Olivia, where Sir Toby, a drunkard and glutton, resides. Although we are not made aware of Sir Andrew's family or connections, it is said that his annual income is 3,000 ducats, a significant amount and roughly equal to that of a skilled craftsman of the period, leading us to assume that he is a gentleman of some leisure. Ineptly, Sir Andrew attempts to court Olivia, and her rejection of him, in favour of dashing Cesario, prompts Sir Andrew to challenge Cesario to a duel. His slow-witted nature allows Sir Toby the perfect opportunity to take advantage of him, openly admitting that by misusing Sir Andrew's generosity and gullibility, he has milked him for approximately two-thirds of his stated income. Sir Andrew fancies himself a great dancer and swordsman, and the scenes where he ineptly engages in these activities are points of physical comedy in the play. Sir Andrew's age is not made clear, but it is assumed that he is some years younger than Sir Toby.

Sir Andrew does not appear in the play after a drunken Sir Toby's rejection of his assistance : "Will you help? An ass-head and a coxcomb and a knave, a thin-faced knave, a gull?".

== Noted performances ==
The Elizabethan actor John Sinklo has been associated with the role of Sir Andrew. Actors who have distinguished themselves in the role of Sir Andrew include Alec Guinness, Paul Scofield, Juan Garibay, Christopher Plummer and Richard E. Grant. Grant excelled in Trevor Nunn's movie adaptation of Twelfth Night: dancing dreadfully in front of Mel Smith's Sir Toby, getting his sword caught in a branch of a tree and being kicked in the groin during his duel with "Cesario" (Imogen Stubbs). When Maria (Imelda Staunton) tricks Malvolio (Nigel Hawthorne) into wearing yellow stockings, she reveals to her fellow conspirators that "'tis a colour [my lady Olivia] abhors". They then turn to Sir Andrew, wearing a yellow waistcoat, tie and stockings. At the end however, he is allowed some dignity by kissing the hand of Olivia (Helena Bonham Carter) before leaving her estate, his head held high.

== Quotes ==
- "but I am a great eater of beef, and I believe that does harm to my wit." (1.3.70)

Sir Andrew explains himself.

- "Nay, let me alone for swearing" (3.4.183)

Sir Andrew's boast that he is an expert at cursing.

- "He does it with a better grace, but I do it more natural" (2.3.83)

Sir Andrew Aguecheek compares his fooling with that of Sir Toby Belch.

- "I was adored once too" (2.3.171)

The reference of this quote is unclear but indicates sadness underneath his carefree and idiotic nature.

== Cultural influence ==
'Sir Andrew Aguecheek' is the first part of Hans Werner Henze's Second Sonata on Shakespearean Characters for guitar, known as Royal Winter Music.
