= Orsino (Twelfth Night) =

Character in Twelfth Night

- Twelfth Night character
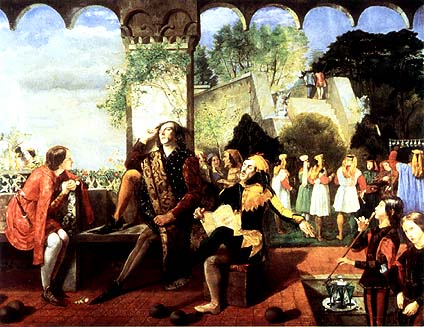
- 1850 painting showing Viola as Cesario looking longingly at Duke Orsino.
- Created by: William Shakespeare

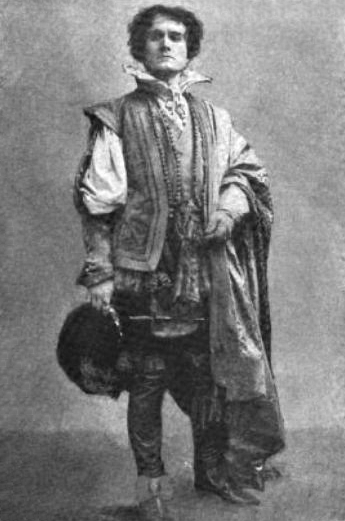
Robert Taber as Orsino

Duke Orsino is a fictional character from William Shakespeare's play Twelfth Night, believed to have been written around 1600-1602.

== Role in the play ==
Duke Orsino is the noble Duke of Illyria. He is a powerful nobleman who is trustworthy and kind to everyone he meets. As a bachelor, Orsino is in love with the beautiful Lady Olivia, and he constantly compares his love for her with music. Duke Orsino is a man with high romantic imagination and is a melancholy lover. He finds himself becoming more and more fond of his new page boy, Cesario (Viola in disguise), the daughter of a nobleman who knew Duke Orsino.

Viola falls in love with Orsino, despite continuing to plead his case to Olivia. But then Olivia, under the impression that Viola was Cesario, falls in love with her. Later, when Viola's twin brother Sebastian comes to Illyria, he is mistaken as Cesario by Olivia and is asked to marry her, to which he agrees. At the end of the play, when the confusion over the identities of Viola and her twin Sebastian is resolved, and Orsino discovers Viola's true identity, he agrees to take Viola as his wife.

Orsino, as seen in the play, is a very passionate man. Being in love with the idea of love, he sees Olivia and immediately thinks up a fantasy, convincing himself any passion inside him is only for her. But when his Page boy "Cesario" begins to work with him, he becomes fond of the boy, which is one reason to explain why he is easily able to switch his love from Olivia to Viola (Cesario) in the end.

Orsino is in love with the idea of being in love and is depressed about this, so when he says "if music be the food of Love, play on" (Act 1 Scene 1) he is trying to cure his depression, and Shakespeare uses a metaphor about feeding love, that refers back to the "food of love".

== Sources ==
- Guide to Twelfth Night
- Summary of Twelfth Night and Characters
