= Spring & Autumn (TV series) =

British television sitcom (1972–1976)

- Series title card
- Also known as: Spring and Autumn
- Genre: Sitcom
- Created by: Vince Powell; Harry Driver
- Written by: Vince Powell; Harry Driver
- Directed by: Stuart Allen (pilot); Ronnie Baxter (Series 1); Mike Vardy (Series 2); Anthony Parker (Series 3–4)
- Starring: Jimmy Jewel; Charlie Hawkins; June Barry; Larry Martyn; Jo Warne
- Music by: Paul Lewis
- Country of origin: United Kingdom
- Original language: English
- No. of series: 4
- No. of episodes: 26 (+ pilot)

Production
- Producers: Stuart Allen (pilot); Ronnie Baxter (Series 1); Mike Vardy (Series 2); Anthony Parker (Series 3–4)
- Camera setup: Multi-camera
- Running time: 30 minutes
- Production company: Thames Television

Original release
- Network: ITV
- Release: 23 October 1972 – 19 October 1976

Spring & Autumn is a British television sitcom that was first broadcast on ITV from 23 October 1972 to 19 October 1976. It was written by Vince Powell and Harry Driver, and starred Jimmy Jewel, Charlie Hawkins, June Barry, Larry Martyn and Jo Warne. The series was one of the last written by Powell and Driver as a writing duo, before Driver's death in 1973.

== Premise ==
Tommy Butler, a retired Northerner widower, moves in with his daughter, Vera, and her husband, Brian, into their high-rise apartment down south. Brian is opposed to the idea of Tommy moving in, and the pair soon argue, while Vera attempts to placate the two. Meanwhile, Charlie Hawkins, a twelve-year-old boy new to the area, strikes up a friendship with Tommy. Charlie is unwanted by his family, and Tommy soon finds himself serving as a father figure to the boy as their friendship develops.

== Cast ==
- Jimmy Jewel as Tommy Butler
- Charlie Hawkins as Charlie Harris
- June Barry as Vera Reid
- Larry Martyn as Brian Reid
- Jo Warne as Betty Harris

== Episodes ==
=== Series overview ===
Series	Episodes	Originally released	
Series	Episodes	First released	Last released
Pilot		23 October 1972	
1	6	16 July 1973	20 August 1973
2	6	24 July 1974	28 August 1974
Sketch		25 December 1973	
3	6	20 May 1976	24 June 1976
4	7	31 August 1976	19 October 1976

=== Pilot (1972) ===
No. overall	No. in series	Title	Produced & Directed by	Written by	Original release date
1	-	"Pilot"	Stuart Allen	Vince Powell and Harry Driver	23 October 1972

=== Series 1 (1973) ===
No. overall	No. in series	Title	Produced & Directed by	Written by	Original release date
2	1	"Episode 1"	Ronnie Baxter	Vince Powell and Harry Driver	16 July 1973
3	2	"Episode 2"	Ronnie Baxter	Vince Powell and Harry Driver	23 July 1973
4	3	"Episode 3"	Ronnie Baxter	Vince Powell and Harry Driver	30 July 1973
5	4	"Episode 4"	Ronnie Baxter	Vince Powell and Harry Driver	6 August 1973
6	5	"Episode 5"	Ronnie Baxter	Vince Powell and Harry Driver	13 August 1973
7	6	"Episode 6"	Ronnie Baxter	Vince Powell and Harry Driver	20 August 1973

=== Christmas sketch (1973) ===
No. overall	No. in series	Title	Produced & Directed by	Written by	Original release date
-	-	"Untitled Christmas Sketch"	Ronnie Baxter	Vince Powell and Harry Driver	25 December 1973
A short sketch broadcast as part of ITV's All Star Comedy Carnival. Final episode written by Powell and Driver together.

=== Series 2 (1974) ===
No. overall	No. in series	Title	Produced & Directed by	Written by	Original release date
8	1	"Episode 1"	Mike Vardy	Vince Powell	24 July 1974
9	2	"Episode 2"	Mike Vardy	Vince Powell	31 July 1974
10	3	"Episode 3"	Mike Vardy	Vince Powell	7 August 1974
11	4	"Episode 4"	Mike Vardy	Vince Powell	14 August 1974
12	5	"Episode 5"	Mike Vardy	Vince Powell	21 August 1974
13	6	"Episode 6"	Mike Vardy	Vince Powell	28 August 1974

=== Series 3 (1976) ===
No. overall	No. in series	Title	Produced & Directed by	Written by	Original release date
14	1	"Episode 1"	Anthony Parker	Vince Powell	20 May 1976
15	2	"Episode 2"	Anthony Parker	Vince Powell	27 May 1976
16	3	"Episode 3"	Anthony Parker	Vince Powell	3 June 1976
17	4	"Episode 4"	Anthony Parker	Vince Powell	10 June 1976
18	5	"Episode 5"	Anthony Parker	Vince Powell	17 June 1976
19	6	"Episode 6"	Anthony Parker	Vince Powell	24 June 1976

=== Series 4 (1976) ===
No. overall	No. in series	Title	Produced & Directed by	Written by	Original release date
20	1	"Episode 1"	Anthony Parker	Vince Powell	31 August 1976
21	2	"Episode 2"	Anthony Parker	Vince Powell	7 September 1976
22	3	"Episode 3"	Anthony Parker	Vince Powell	14 September 1976
23	4	"Episode 4"	Anthony Parker	Vince Powell	21 September 1976
24	5	"Episode 5"	Anthony Parker	Vince Powell	28 September 1976
25	6	"Episode 6"	Anthony Parker	Vince Powell	5 October 1976
26	7	"Episode 7"	Anthony Parker	Vince Powell	19 October 1976

== Production ==
The series was originally titled Spring and Autumn onscreen for the pilot episode, but was altered to Spring & Autumn for subsequent episodes. The title refers to the life seasons of the two principal characters, Charlie Hawkins (Spring, relative to childhood) and Tommy Butler (Autumn, relative to adulthood). The pilot episode featured different actors and character names from those that appeared in the series. The character of Charlie Harris was named Colin Harris, and was played by Gary Williams. The character of Brain Reid was named Joe Dickinson, while the character of Betty Harris was named Betty Dickinson, married to Joe instead of being Colin Harris's mother, and was portrayed by Gaye Brown. The first episode of the first series was broadcast ten months after the pilot and was a remake of that episode, with the new cast members and character names being included.

The series, alongside Love Thy Neighbour (1972–1976), was the last written together by Vince Powell and Harry Driver, before Driver's death on 25 November 1973. Jimmy Jewel had previously appeared in the television sitcom Nearest and Dearest (1968–1973), created by Powell and Driver. The writers had enjoyed working with Jewel on that series and had promised to write another sitcom for him. The theme tune, "Autumn Love", was composed by Paul Lewis.

== Release ==
=== Broadcast ===
All episodes of the series were broadcast on ITV. The pilot episode was broadcast on Monday, 23 October 1972 at 8:30 pm. The first series aired on Mondays at 8:00 pm, from 16 July to 20 August 1973. A sketch was included in the 1973 edition of All Star Comedy Carnival, which aired on Tuesday, 25 December at 6:30 pm. The second series aired on Wednesdays at 8:00 pm from 24 July to 28 August 1974, while the third series aired on Thursdays at the same time, from 20 May to 24 June 1976. The fourth and final series aired from 31 August to 19 October 1976, mostly at 8:30 pm.

=== Home media releases ===
All four series have been released in Region 2 on DVD by Network Distributing. The first series release included the 1972 pilot episode. The 1973 All Star Comedy Carnival sketch was released by Network on 5 December 2016, in a DVD release containing the 1972 and 1973 editions of All Star Comedy Carnival.

Title	Release date	Ref.
The Complete First Series	7 February 2011	
The Complete Second Series	1 July 2012	
The Complete Third Series	18 February 2013	
The Complete Fourth Series	12 May 2013	

== Reception ==
Nancy Banks-Smith, writing for The Guardian, reviewed the series several times throughout its run. In 1973, following the airing of the first episode of the first series, Banks-Smith called the series "a surprisingly good egg", praising the director and the performances of Jimmy Jewel and Charlie Hawkins. However, her review for the second series' premiere episode in 1974 was less positive, stating that, while the series began as a "pleasantly sentimental story" that had a "kind of charm", the new series instead "had a lot of plot". Banks-Smith was further critical of the series in her review for the first episode of the third series in 1976, stating that the series "looks as if it were made without love or money".

Mark Lewisohn, writing in the Radio Times Guide to TV Comedy (2003), called the series "a pleasingly gentle, if predictable, comedy", that was notable for its writers "deviating from their usual race/religion topics". In Raising Laughter (2021), Robert Sellers described the series as a "pleasingly gentle comedy". Brian Slade, writing for Television Heaven, stated that "there is nothing particularly earth shattering" about the series, but wrote that "it’s hard not to warm to the two lead characters". Although Slade noted that the comedy is "dated" and that the supporting cast is "largely forgettable", noting that Martyn's "constant outrage can be a little grating", he praised the chemistry between Jewel and Hawkins, stating that their onscreen relationship was "hugely believable", and that "the two make the gentle comedy of Spring and Autumn [sic] a likeable treat seemingly long forgotten to the archives". In a 2025 article published on the British Comedy Guide, Graham McCann described the sitcom as a "slow-moving and rather downbeat comedy", praising the chemistry between Jewel and Martyn, noting that "each competed to steal the scene from the other" and commenting that "their dialogue, focussing on familial strife, could just as easily have been played for dramatic instead of comic effect".
