= Not on Your Nellie =

British TV sitcom (1974–1975)

- Series 1 DVD cover
- Created by: Roy Bottomley; Tom Brennand
- Starring: Hylda Baker; John Barrett; Leo Dolan; David Rayner; Roger Howlett; Azad Ali; Alexandra Dane; Wendy Richard; Sue Nicholls; Jack Douglas
- Country of origin: United Kingdom
- Original language: English
- No. of series: 3
- No. of episodes: 17

Production
- Producer: London Weekend Television
- Running time: 25 minutes

Original release
- Network: ITV
- Release: 15 March 1974 – 29 August 1975

Not On Your Nellie is a British sitcom that ran from 15 March 1974 until 29 August 1975. It starred veteran actress Hylda Baker as Nellie Pickersgill, a Bolton woman who moves to London to help run her ailing father's Chelsea pub. Seventeen episodes of the series were produced by London Weekend Television for the ITV network.

== Premise ==
When Jed Pickersgill (John Barrett) finds himself too ill to run his Chelsea pub, The Brown Cow, he calls upon his middle-aged daughter Nellie for help. Nellie, however, is teetotal and does not approve of alcohol (or any vice) and attempts to maintain order in the pub by keeping a watchful eye on the regulars and her wayward father. Regular customers included Charlie (Leo Dolan), a window cleaner whose pastimes included booze and women; Ali (Azad Ali), an Asian London Underground worker who was forever being assaulted in the line of duty; George (David Raynor), an effeminate gay man who runs a nearby fashion boutique; and Gilbert (Roger Howlett), his flamboyantly dressed but always silent boyfriend. There was a new busty barmaid in each series (each disapproved of by Nellie), including Beryl (Alexandra Dane), Doris (Wendy Richard), and "Big Brenda" (Sue Nicholls).

== Series history ==
Not On Your Nellie first premiered in 1974, the year after the end of Baker's previous series, Nearest and Dearest. In a 1973 television interview with Baker (available on the Series 7 DVD of Nearest and Dearest), she stated that Not On Your Nellie was planned as a spin-off from Nearest and Dearest and would focus on the character Nellie Pledge after her brother Eli (Jimmy Jewel) deserts her following the end of their family business, Pledge's Purer Pickles.

However, Baker's character in Not On Your Nellie was not Nellie Pledge, but Nellie Pickersgill - an identical character in all but name. Not On Your Nellie was created by Roy Bottomley and Tom Brennand and was based on a stage play that they had written for Baker in the frame of the Nellie Pledge character. Bottomley and Brennand were two of the regular writers for Nearest and Dearest, but were not the series creators (Nearest was created by Vince Powell and Harry Driver and was produced by Granada Television). As such, neither Bottomley or Brennand (or London Weekend Television) had any rights to the character of Nellie Pledge, so this is likely to be what facilitated the name change to Pickersgill.

As with Nearest and Dearest, much of the comedy stemmed from Baker's malapropisms and partially improvised Northern humour, and Not On Your Nellie was essentially a new version (and equivalent) of Nearest and Dearest in a different location. Unfortunately this issue was not helped by the fact that Bottomley and Brennand recycled many of their old gags - and even their entire scripts - from Nearest and Dearest (this can be seen most prominently in the 1975 episode "Feeling The Draught" which was a remake of their 1969 Nearest and Dearest episode "Two Pennies To Rub Together").

The series also allowed Baker, a veteran of comedy, theatre, and music hall, to exhibit more of her stage abilities such as singing, clog dancing, and piano playing, and she wrote and performed the series' occasional end title theme song.

Despite the similarities, Not On Your Nellie did not match the success of Nearest and Dearest. 1975 also saw major cast changes occurring before production of the third series commenced, with Barratt, Raynor, Ali, and Richard all leaving the show to work on other TV projects. Two new characters were brought in to accommodate the changes, including Jack Douglas as Nellie's cousin Stanley and Sue Nicholls as new barmaid Brenda.

During the taping of the third series in 1975, Baker slipped on set and injured herself. Although she appeared in a wheelchair for one episode after the accident, she then left the series and took legal action against London Weekend Television for her injury. One further episode was made without her (where it was explained her character was away in hospital) but the show was then abruptly axed only four episodes into its third series, marking both the end of Baker's time at LWT and her regular television career.

== Episodes ==
=== Series 1 ===
- "Nellie Comes To Town" (15 March 1974)
- "Something in the Night" (22 March 1974)
- "The Anniversary Present" (29 March 1974)
- "The Restless Spirit" (5 April 1974)
- "The Apartment" (12 April 1974)
- "The Wind of Change" (19 April 1974)
- " Bring on the Dancing Girls" (26 April 1974)

=== Series 2 ===
- "Brief Encounter" (24 January 1975)
- "High Society" (31 January 1975)
- "Requiem for a Heavyweight" (7 February 1975)
- "Do Unto Others" (14 February 1975)
- "The Lady with the Lamp" (21 February 1975)
- "Feeling The Draught" (28 February 1975)

=== Series 3 ===
- "Be Prepared" (8 August 1975)
- "A-Haunting We Will Go" (15 August 1975)
- "The French Correction" (22 August 1975)
- "Called to the Bar" (29 August 1975)

== DVD release ==
All three series of the show have been released on DVD by Network in the UK. The first series also includes the series finale of Nearest and Dearest as a bonus feature.
