= List of Love Thy Neighbour (1972 TV series) episodes =

This is an episode list for the British television sitcom Love Thy Neighbour, which was created by Vince Powell and Harry Driver. The series ran for eight series, and was broadcast on ITV1 from 13 April 1972 to 22 January 1976. There were fifty-three episodes in total, and each episode ran for a duration of 30 minutes, except for the 1973 New Year's Special, which ran for 45 minutes.

A pilot episode, featuring Gwendolyn Watts as Joan Booth, was also produced, but was never broadcast. Its script was modified slightly to become the first episode of the series proper, titled "New Neighbours".

== Series overview ==
Season	Episodes	Originally released	
Season	Episodes	First released	Last released
Pilot		Unbroadcast	
1	7	13 April 1972	25 May 1972
2	6	11 September 1972	16 October 1972
Sketch		25 December 1972	
3	6	19 March 1973	30 April 1973
4	8	12 December 1973	4 February 1974
5	6	18 February 1974	1 April 1974
6	7	2 January 1975	13 February 1975
7	7	17 April 1975	29 May 1975
8	6	11 December 1975	22 January 1976

== Episodes ==
=== Unaired pilot ===
No. overall	No. in series	Title	Produced & Directed by	Written by	Original release date
-	-	Love Thy Neighbour	Stuart Allen	Vince Powell and Harry Driver	Unbroadcast
An unbroadcast pilot of the series. The part of Joan Booth was played by Gwendolyn Watts in this episode only.

=== Series 1 (1972) ===
No. overall	No. in series	Title	Produced & Directed by	Written by	Original release date
1	1	"New Neighbours"	Stuart Allen	Vince Powell and Harry Driver	13 April 1972
2	2	"Limbo Dancing"	Stuart Allen	Vince Powell and Harry Driver	20 April 1972
3	3	"The Petition"	Stuart Allen	Vince Powell and Harry Driver	27 April 1972
4	4	"Factory Dispute"	Stuart Allen	Vince Powell and Harry Driver	4 May 1972
5	5	"The Seven Year Itch"	Stuart Allen	Vince Powell and Harry Driver	11 May 1972
6	6	"Refused a Drink"	Stuart Allen	Vince Powell and Harry Driver	18 May 1972
7	7	"Sex Appeal"	Stuart Allen	Vince Powell and Harry Driver	25 May 1972

=== Series 2 (1972) ===
No. overall	No. in series	Title	Produced & Directed by	Written by	Original release date
8	1	"The Housewarming Party"	Stuart Allen	Vince Powell and Harry Driver	11 September 1972
9	2	"Voodoo"	Stuart Allen	Vince Powell and Harry Driver	18 September 1972
10	3	"Clarky Leaves"	Stuart Allen	Vince Powell and Harry Driver	25 September 1972
11	4	"The Bedroom Suite"	Stuart Allen	Vince Powell and Harry Driver	2 October 1972
12	5	"The TUC Conference '72"	Stuart Allen	Vince Powell and Harry Driver	9 October 1972
13	6	"Religious Fervour"	Stuart Allen	Vince Powell and Harry Driver	16 October 1972

=== Christmas sketch (1972) ===
No. overall	No. in series	Title	Produced & Directed by	Written by	Original release date
-	-	"Untitled Christmas Sketch"	Stuart Allen	Vince Powell and Harry Driver	25 December 1972
A short sketch broadcast as part of ITV's All Star Comedy Carnival.

=== Series 3 (1973) ===
No. overall	No. in series	Title	Produced & Directed by	Written by	Original release date
14	1	"The GPO"	Ronnie Baxter	Vince Powell and Harry Driver	19 March 1973
15	2	"The Car"	Ronnie Baxter	Vince Powell and Harry Driver	26 March 1973
16	3	"Eddie Returns from Holiday"	Ronnie Baxter	Vince Powell and Harry Driver	2 April 1973
17	4	"Lion and the Lamb"	Ronnie Baxter	Vince Powell and Harry Driver	9 April 1973
18	5	"The Lift"	Ronnie Baxter	Vince Powell and Harry Driver	16 April 1973
19	6	"Barbie Becomes Pregnant"	Ronnie Baxter	Vince Powell and Harry Driver	30 April 1973

=== Series 4 (1973–74) ===
No. overall	No. in series	Title	Produced & Directed by	Written by	Original release date
Series
20	1	"Hines' Sight"	Ronnie Baxter	Vince Powell and Harry Driver	12 December 1973
21	2	"Friendly"	Ronnie Baxter	Vince Powell and Harry Driver	19 December 1973
New Year's Special
22	3	"Working on New Year's Eve"	Ronnie Baxter	Vince Powell and Harry Driver	31 December 1973
Note: This was an extended New Year's Special, which ran for a duration of 45 minutes.
Series
23	4	"Eddie's Mother-in-Law"	Ronnie Baxter	Vince Powell and Harry Driver	7 January 1974
24	5	"The Ante-Natal Clinic"	Ronnie Baxter	Vince Powell and Harry Driver	14 January 1974
25	6	"Two Weeks to Babies"	Ronnie Baxter	Vince Powell and Harry Driver	21 January 1974
26	7	"To the Hospital"	Ronnie Baxter	Vince Powell and Harry Driver	28 January 1974
27	8	"The Big Day"	Ronnie Baxter	Vince Powell and Harry Driver	4 February 1974
Note: This was the final episode co-written by Harry Driver, who died in November 1973.

=== Series 5 (1974) ===
No. overall	No. in series	Title	Produced & Directed by	Written by	Original release date
28	1	"The Mediterranean"	Anthony Parker	Vince Powell	18 February 1974
Note: This was the first episode solely written by Vince Powell, following Driver's death.
29	2	"Bananas"	Anthony Parker	Vince Powell	4 March 1974
30	3	"Teething Problems"	Anthony Parker	Vince Powell	11 March 1974
31	4	"Cat's Away"	Anthony Parker	Vince Powell	18 March 1974
32	5	"Ghosts"	Anthony Parker	Vince Powell	25 March 1974
33	6	"Eddie's Birthday"	Anthony Parker	Vince Powell	1 April 1974

=== Series 6 (1975) ===
No. overall	No. in series	Title	Produced & Directed by	Written by	Original release date
34	1	"Reggie"	Anthony Parker	Vince Powell	2 January 1975
35	2	"Jacko's Wedding"	Anthony Parker	Vince Powell	9 January 1975
36	3	"Duel at Dawn"	Anthony Parker	Vince Powell	16 January 1975
37	4	"The Darts' Final"	Anthony Parker	Vince Powell	23 January 1975
38	5	"Royal Blood"	Anthony Parker	Vince Powell	30 January 1975
39	6	"Club Concert"	Anthony Parker	Vince Powell	6 February 1975
40	7	"The Nannies"	Anthony Parker	Vince Powell	13 February 1975
Note: This was the final episode written by Vince Powell.

=== Series 7 (1975) ===
No. overall	No. in series	Title	Produced & Directed by	Written by	Original release date
41	1	"Famous Crimes"	William G. Stewart	Sid Colin	17 April 1975
42	2	"The Lady and the Tramp"	William G. Stewart	Brian Cooke	24 April 1975
43	3	"Protection of the Law"	William G. Stewart	Jon Watkins	1 May 1975
44	4	"The Opinion Poll"	William G. Stewart	H. V. Kershaw	8 May 1975
45	5	"Manchester... United"	William G. Stewart	Colin Edmonds	15 May 1975
46	6	"The TUC Conference '76"	William G. Stewart	George Evans and Lawrie Wyman	22 May 1975
47	7	"The Coach Trip"	William G. Stewart	Spike Mullins	29 May 1975
This episode is alternatively known as "The Coach Outing to Bournemouth".

=== Series 8 (1975–76) ===
No. overall	No. in series	Title	Produced & Directed by	Written by	Original release date
Series
48	1	"The Local By-Election"	Anthony Parker	Johnnie Mortimer	11 December 1975
49	2	"Eddie Becomes a Father Again"	Anthony Parker	Brian Cooke	18 December 1975
Christmas Special
50	3	"Christmas Spirit"	Anthony Parker	Sid Colin	25 December 1975
Series
51	4	"For Sale"	Anthony Parker	H. V. Kershaw	8 January 1976
52	5	"Power Cut"	Anthony Parker	George Evans and Lawrie Wyman	15 January 1976
53	6	"The Lodger"	Anthony Parker	Adele Rose	22 January 1976
Note: No writer was listed in the credits of this episode. However, the TV Times credited Adele Rose as writer.
