= Vince Powell =

British television scriptwriter (1928–2009)

- Born: Vincent Joseph Smith; 6 August 1928; Miles Platting, Manchester, England
- Died: 13 July 2009 (aged 80); Guildford, Surrey, England
- Occupation: Scriptwriter
- Children: Three
- Writing career
- Period: 1960–1996
- Genre: Television
- Notable works: Pardon the Expression (1965–1966); Never Mind the Quality Feel the Width (1967–1971); Nearest and Dearest (1968–1973); Bless This House (1971–1976); Love Thy Neighbour (1972–1976); Mind Your Language (1977–1979, 1986); Never the Twain (1983–1991)

Vincent Joseph Powell (6 August 1928 – 13 July 2009) was a British television scriptwriter. Known for writing television sitcoms, he collaborated with a writing partner, Harry Driver, until his death in 1973.

== Early life ==
Powell was born as Vincent Joseph Smith to Roman Catholic parents in Miles Platting, Manchester. When he was five, his mother died; two years later, his father remarried. Powell began a career as a tailor following the lead of his father, while performing as a comedian in the evenings. He met Harry Driver on the local club circuit. Their performing partnership, under the name Hammond and Powell, lasted until 1955 when Driver's health and physical mobility became severely impaired by the onset of polio.

== Career ==
With his writing partner, Harry Driver, the partnership was hired to write material for comedian Harry Worth in Manchester for the BBC in 1960. The show, Here's Harry (co-written with Frank Roscoe) ran for five years. The partnership was better known for writing for ITV franchise holders from the early-1960s, beginning with Coronation Street from 1961; Powell ceased writing for the programme in 1964, but Driver's involvement continued until he died in 1973. Powell and Driver created and wrote eleven sitcoms for ITV in an eight-year period, including the shows Bless This House (with Sid James) and Love Thy Neighbour, though other writers contributed scripts to both series. The latter programme, according to The Times, was "one of television's most notorious, if at the time highly popular, comedies". While it was "intended to debunk racial stereotypes" it "came to be widely condemned for doing exactly the opposite."

== Script projects ==
- Pardon the Expression (1965–66), starring Arthur Lowe reprising the role of Leonard Swindley, a character which first appeared in Coronation Street.
- George and the Dragon (1966–68), starring Sid James and Peggy Mount as chauffeur and housekeeper to Colonel Maynard (John Le Mesurier).
- Never Mind the Quality, Feel the Width (1967–1971), set in the London rag trade, featuring an ethnically mis-matched pair of tailors, the Jewish Manny Cohen (John Bluthal) and the Irish-Catholic Patrick Kelly (Joe Lynch).
- Nearest and Dearest (1968–1973), set in a pickle factory in Colne, North-West of England, starring Hylda Baker and Jimmy Jewel as squabbling siblings Nellie and Eli Pledge, running the Pickle Factory business left by their late father. Powell and Driver left after the first series, though the show (written by writers such as Roy Bottomley and Tom Brennand) continued in their absence.
- Two in Clover (1969–70), starring Sid James and Victor Spinetti, as clerks-turned-farmers.
- For the Love of Ada (1970–71), in which Irene Handl and Wilfred Pickles played romantically involved pensioners.
- Bless This House (1971–76), starring Sid James and Diana Coupland, as Sid and Jean Abbott, along with Robin Stewart and Sally Geeson as their teenage son and daughter, living in Birch Avenue, Putney.
- Love Thy Neighbour (1972–1976), centred around a white couple and a black couple living as next-door neighbours in Twickenham, London, during an era, in which Britain was coming to terms with the population of Black Immigrants. The series featured Jack Smethurst and Kate Williams as Eddie and Joan Booth, with Rudolph Walker and Nina Baden-Semper as Bill and Barbie Reynolds. Powell co-wrote a 1979 sequel Love Thy Neighbour in Australia.
- Spring & Autumn (1972–1976), starring Jimmy Jewel as a retired widower, parting ways from Up North to live with his daughter and her husband in a high-rise block, Down South, let alone making friends with a pre-teen cockney lad.

After Driver died, Powell worked solo and created later shows such as:

- The Wackers (1975), set in Liverpool, starring Ken Jones and Sheila Fay. Notable for early TV roles for Alison Steadman and Keith Chegwin as the lead couple's teenage children. The show caused such a backlash that the series was scrapped before the last episode was broadcast and never repeated again.
- Mind Your Language (1977–1979, 1986), starring Barry Evans (previously in the Doctor... series) as the English-Foreign Language teacher Mr Jeremy Brown, set in an adult education college of foreign characters in late-1970s London.
- Young at Heart (1977–1982)
- Father Charlie (1982), starring Lionel Jeffries as a chaplain sent to a convent inhabited by nuns. Co-written with Myles Rudge, the series ran for six episodes.
- Bottle Boys (1984–85), starring Robin Askwith as Dave Deacon, a football-obsessed milkman.

Powell also penned a number of scripts for the popular 1980s sitcom Never the Twain (1981–1991) starring Windsor Davies and Donald Sinden, also for Thames Television, writing all of the final episodes from 1989 to 1991. Plus he wrote three series (20 episodes) of the Radio 2 sitcom For Better Or For Worse, starring Gorden Kaye and Su Pollard, between 1993 and 1996.

Powell contributed material to the Cilla Black vehicles Blind Date (224 episodes) and Surprise, Surprise (130 episodes). He published his autobiography, From Rags to Gags: The Memoirs of a Comedy Writer, in 2008.

== Death ==
Powell died aged 80 in Guildford, Surrey. His first marriage ended in divorce; as did his second marriage, to Judi Smith. His third marriage, to Geraldine Moore, ended when he died. He had a son from his second marriage, and a son and daughter from his third.

== Writing credits ==
Production	Notes	Broadcaster/Distributor
Here's Harry	51 episodes (1960–1965)	BBC 1
Coronation Street	18 episodes (1961–1962, 1964-1967)	ITV
De Laatste Trein	Television film (co-written with Harry Driver and Frank Roscoe, 1962)	VARA
The Saturday Show	3 episodes (co-written with Frank Roscoe, 1962)	ITV
De Rally	Television film (co-written with Harry Driver and Frank Roscoe, 1962)	VARA
Herrie om Harrie	7 episodes (co-written with Frank Roscoe, 1963-1964)	NCRV
Comedy Playhouse	"Fools Rush In" (co-written with Frank Roscoe, 1963); "The Mascot" (co-written with Frank Roscoe, 1963); "Spanner in the Works" (co-written with Harry Driver, 1967)	BBC 1
The Villains	"Les Girls" (co-written with Harry Driver, 1964)	ITV
Pardon the Expression	16 episodes (co-written with Harry Driver, 1965-1966)	ITV
Adam Adamant Lives!	"Beauty Is an Ugly Word" (co-written with Harry Driver, 1966); "The Village of Evil" (co-written with Harry Driver, 1966); "Conspiracy of Death" (co-written with Harry Driver, 1967); "The Survivors" (co-written with Harry Driver, 1967); "The Deadly Bullet" (co-written with Harry Driver, 1967)	BBC 1
George and the Dragon	26 episodes (co-written with Harry Driver, 1966-1968)	ITV
That's Show Business	Television film (co-written with Harry Driver, 1967)	ITV
Armchair Theatre	"Never Mind the Quality, Feel the Width" (co-written with Harry Driver, 1967)	ITV
Never Mind the Quality, Feel the Width	29 episodes (co-written with Harry Driver, 1967-1971)	ABC Television; ITV
Best of Enemies	5 episodes (co-written with Harry Driver, 1968–1969)	ITV
Nearest and Dearest	13 episodes (co-written with Harry Driver, 1968–1973)	ITV
Two in Clover	13 episodes (co-written with Harry Driver, 1969–1970)	ITV
For the Love of Ada	27 episodes (co-written with Harry Driver, 1970–1971)	ITV
Bless This House	13 episodes (co-written with Harry Driver, 1971–1974)	ITV
Mike and Bernie	6 episodes (co-written with Harry Driver, 1971–1972)	ITV
Love Thy Neighbour	42 episodes (1972–1975)	ITV
Spring & Autumn	26 episodes (1972–1976)	ITV
All Star Comedy Carnival	"Love Thy Neighbour" (mini-episode, 1972); "Spring and Autumn" (mini-episode, 1973)	ITV
For the Love of Ada	Feature film (co-written with Harry Driver, 1972)	Tigon British Film Productions
Cheap at Half the Price	Television film (co-written with Harry Driver, 1972)	ITV
Never Mind the Quality, Feel the Width	Feature film (co-written with Harry Driver, 1973)	EMI-MGM
Love Thy Neighbour	Feature film (co-written with Harry Driver, 1973)	Hammer Films; Anglo-EMI (International)
The Wackers	7 episodes (1 unaired) (1975)	ITV
My Son Reuben	6 episodes (1975)	ITV
Rule Britannia!	7 episodes (1975)	ITV
Paradise Island	"A Stranger in Paradise" (1977)	ITV
The Fosters	"Who Needs Friends?" (1977)	ITV
Odd Man Out	7 episodes (1977)	ITV
Mind Your Language	42 episodes (1977-1979, 1986)	ITV
Carry On Emmannuelle	Feature film (additional material, 1978)	Hemdale
Give Us a Clue	2 episodes (1979, 1981)	ITV
Love Thy Neighbour	Australian version of British series; 7 episodes (1980)	Seven Network
Young at Heart	19 episodes (1980-1982)	ITV
Home Sweet Home	"No Flame Like an Old Flame" (1980)	ABC TV
A Sharp Intake of Breath	6 episodes (1981)	ITV
Ik ben Joep Meloen	Feature film (1981)	TROS; Video Garant
Father Charlie	"The New Chaplain" (1982); "Miracles Take a Little Longer" (1982); "Halfway to Heaven" (1982); "Better the Devil You Know" (1982)	ITV
An Age Apart	"A Log Way from Home" (1983); "Don't Rock the Boat" (1983); "Out of the Frying Pan" (1983); "Home Is Where the Heart Is" (1983)	TVNZ
Never the Twain	31 episodes (1983-1984, 1986-1991)	ITV
Bottle Boys	13 episodes (1984-1985)	ITV
Mixed Doubles	"Semper Fidelis" (1985); "TV or Not TV" (1985); "The Facts of Life" (1986); "If at First You Don't Succeed" (1986)	ITV
Slinger's Day	6 episodes (1986-1987)	ITV
Superfrank!	Television film (co-written with Andrew Nickolds and Miles Tredinnick, 1987)	Channel 4
