= John Bluthal =

Polish actor (1929–2018)

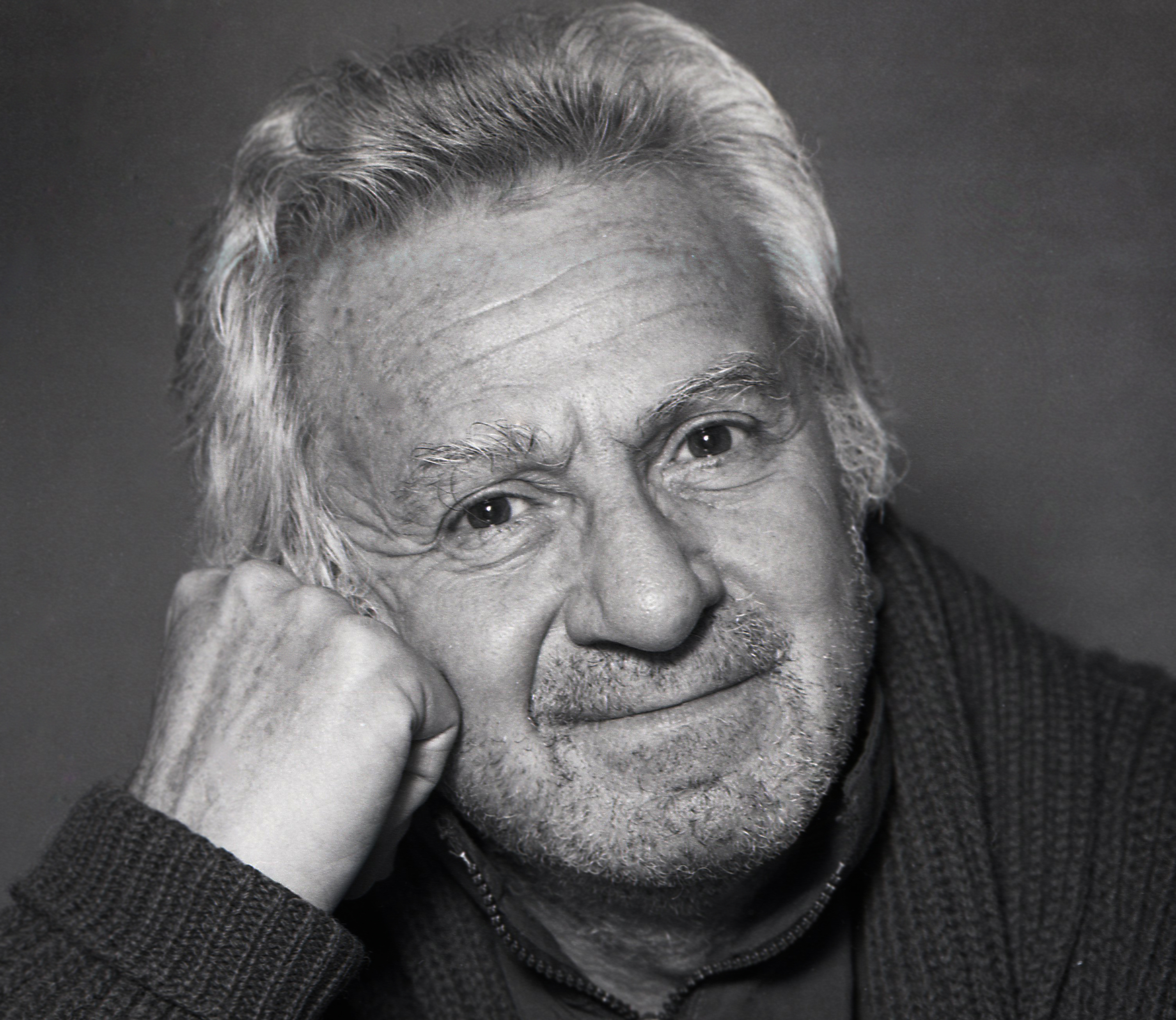
- Bluthal in 1993
- Born: Isaac Bluthal; 12 August 1929; Jezierzany, Galicia, Poland
- Died: 15 November 2018 (aged 89); Sydney, New South Wales, Australia
- Education: University of Melbourne
- Occupations: Actor; comedian
- Years active: 1953–2018
- Spouse: Judyth Barron (m. 1956, separated)
- Children: 2

John Bluthal (born Isaac Bluthal; 12 August 1929 – 15 November 2018) was a Polish actor and comedian, noted for his six-decade career internationally in Australia, the United Kingdom and the United States.

He started his career during the Golden Age of British Television, where he was best known for his comedy work in the UK with Spike Milligan, and for his role as Manny Cohen in the television series Never Mind the Quality, Feel the Width. In later years, he was known to television audiences as the bumbling Frank Pickle in The Vicar of Dibley. At 85 he played Professor Herbert Marcuse in the Coen brothers' film Hail, Caesar! (2016).

== Early life ==
Bluthal was born to a Jewish family in Jezierzany, Galicia, Poland (now in Ukraine). Due to anti-Semitism in Poland, his family emigrated to Melbourne, Australia, in 1938, when he was aged nine. He was educated at Princes Hill Central School in Carlton North and University High School in Parkville. He began his acting career in Melbourne's Yiddish Theatre and subsequently studied drama at the University of Melbourne.

In 1949, he travelled to Europe and the United Kingdom, during which time he appeared in pantomime. He worked in repertory theatre in Melbourne and appeared in Australian radio dramas, as well as television productions including Shell Presents and Three's A Crowd. He also devised and produced Gaslight Music Hall, in which he starred.

== Career ==
Bluthal moved to the United Kingdom permanently in 1960 and appeared in Citizen James in 1960 for BBC television, and the long-running ITV comedy series Never Mind the Quality, Feel the Width (1967–71) in which he played Manny Cohen, a Jewish London tailor in business with an Irish Catholic tailor, Patrick Kelly, played by Joe Lynch. Also in the 1960s, he provided the voice for Commander Zero in the television Supermarionation series Fireball XL5 (1962–63).

Bluthal had worked with Spike Milligan before leaving Australia, appearing with him in a 1958 Australian television special, The Gladys Half-Hour, in the Australian radio comedy series The Idiot Weekly. On relocating to Britain, he appeared as several characters in Milligan and John Antrobus' stage play The Bedsitting Room, which opened at the Mermaid Theatre on 31 January 1963. He also appeared in The Omar Khayyam Show, a UK remake of episodes from The Idiot Weekly. He later worked extensively with Milligan on the television series Q and its radio counterpart The Milligan Show. Bluthal was able to produce many comedic and imitative voices, like Milligan's radio colleague Peter Sellers, and he was used somewhat like Sellers in Milligan's later work.

Bluthal worked extensively in British theatre. In 1960 he played Fagin in the original production of the musical Oliver! in the West End (replacing Ron Moody). His appearances at the National Theatre included Tales from Hollywood, Entertaining Strangers, Peter Hall's production of Antony and Cleopatra (with Judi Dench and Anthony Hopkins), Yonaadab, The Tempest, The Winter's Tale, and Cymbeline.

His other television appearances include the Sykes and a... episode "Sykes and a Bath", broadcast on 25 January 1961, Hancock ("The Radio Ham", 1961), The Avengers ("Two's a Crowd", 1965), The Saint ("The Happy Suicide", 1965), 'Allo 'Allo! (1984), Minder (1985), Bergerac (1990), One Foot in the Grave (1990), Rumpole of the Bailey (1991), Inspector Morse (1993), Lovejoy (1994), Last of the Summer Wine (1995), and Jonathan Creek (1997), as well as appearing as Major Cheeseburger in The Goodies' episode "Clown Virus". He also replaced Ronnie Stevens in the Australian comedy/satire series The Mavis Bramston Show for the second half of 1966 and starred as "Enzo Pacelli" in the ABC-TV comedy television series Home Sweet Home (1982–83). Bluthal also appeared as Leonid Krasin in episodes of the Thames TV series Reilly, Ace of Spies (1983). and "Chalky", a hospital patient, in the episode "I Gotta Horse" of the comedy television series Doctor Down Under (1979) the Australian series of the British television series syndicated internationally as Doctor in the House, which also starred Robin Nedwell as Dr. Duncan Waring and Geoffrey Davies as Dr. Dick Stuart-Clark.

His films appearances include: The Knack ...and How to Get It (1965), three Carry On films, two of the Doctor films, and also The Beatles' films A Hard Day's Night (1964) and Help! (1965), three roles in Casino Royale (1967), and two of the Pink Panther films. Bluthal also played several characters in The Great McGonagall (1974), by Spike Milligan and Joseph McGrath, based on the life of William McGonagall. He portrayed an Egyptologist in the year 1914 for the first part of the film The Fifth Element (1997) and Uncle Karl in Dark City (1998). He also appeared in the comedy Beware of Greeks Bearing Guns (2000).

His later television appearances were in the sitcom The Vicar of Dibley as the fastidious minutes-taker Frank Pickle and as the caretaker Rocco in Spirited.

He also appeared in the 2004 film Love's Brother and in the 2016 Coen brothers film Hail, Caesar!

His final appearance was with his daughter Lisa Bluthal in her 2018 short film By Any Other Name, a comedy about a daughter dealing with her father's Alzheimer's.

== Personal life ==
Bluthal married actress Judyth Barron in 1956, but later separated. They had two daughters. Barron died in 2016.

Bluthal's sister Nita married Stephen Murray-Smith, making Joanna Murray-Smith his niece.

== Death ==
Bluthal's agent confirmed on 16 November 2018 that the actor had died, aged 89, in New South Wales, Australia.

=== Tributes ===
Following his death, fellow The Vicar of Dibley actor Dawn French said "Tons of happy laughs remembered today. Cheeky, naughty, hilarious. Bye darlin' Bluey." On 22 December 2018, BBC One aired The Vicar of Dibley's December 1996 episode "The Christmas Lunch Incident" with a caption at the end remembering Bluthal's death. Similarly the final episode of the lockdown edition of The Vicar of Dibley ended with a tribute just before the closing credits reading, "In loving memory of Liz, John, Emma and Roger", paying tribute to him and also three other deceased Dibley cast members (Liz Smith, Emma Chambers and Roger Lloyd-Pack).

In 2025, Bluthal appeared on a British postage stamp issued as part of a special set by Royal Mail, which commemorated the series The Vicar of Dibley.

== Filmography ==
=== Film ===
Year	Title	Role	Director	Notes
1963	The Mouse on the Moon	Von Neidel	Richard Lester	
1963	Doctor in Distress	Railway Porter	Ralph Thomas	Uncredited
1964	This Is My Street	Joe	Sidney Hayers	
1964	Father Came Too!	Robert the Bruce	Peter Graham Scott	
1964	A Hard Day's Night	Car Thief	Richard Lester	Uncredited
1964	Carry On Spying	Head Waiter / Doctor Crow	Gerald Thomas	Voice
1965	The Knack ...and How to Get It	Angry Father	Richard Lester	
1965	Help!	Bhuta	Richard Lester	
1966	A Funny Thing Happened on the Way to the Forum	Roman Chief Guard	Richard Lester	
1967	Casino Royale	Casino Doorman / MI5 Man	John Huston; Ken Hughes; Val Guest; Robert Parrish; Joseph McGrath	
1967	Carry On... Follow That Camel	Cpl. Clotski	Gerald Thomas	
1968	A Ghost of a Chance	Mayor's Assistant	Jan Darnley-Smith	(Children's Film Foundation)
1968	Don't Raise the Bridge, Lower the River	Dr. Pinto	Jerry Lewis	
1968	The Bliss of Mrs. Blossom	Judge	Joseph McGrath	
1969	The Undertakers		Brian Cummins	Short
1969	A Talent for Loving	Martinelli	Richard Quine	
1970	Doctor in Trouble	1st Cabbie	Ralph Thomas	
1971	Carry On Henry	Royal Tailor	Gerald Thomas	Uncredited
1972	Nightmare	Capt. John Tredinnick	Jeremy Summers	
1973	Never Mind the Quality, Feel the Width	Manny Cohen	Ronnie Baxter	
1973	Digby, the Biggest Dog in the World	Jerry	Joseph McGrath	
1973	The Flying Sorcerer	Uncle Charlie	Harry Booth	
1974	The Over-Amorous Artist	Indian Salesman	Maurice Hamblin	
1975	The Great McGonagall	Mr. Giles / MacDuff / Hercules Paint / British Soldier / Policeman / McLain / Sheriff / Judge	Joseph McGrath	
1975	The Return of the Pink Panther	Blind Beggar	Blake Edwards	
1976	Fantasm	Professor Jungenot A. Freud	Richard Bruce	Uncredited
1977	Survival Kit		Karin Altmann	Short
1978	The Irishman	Dave	Donald Crombie	
1978	Revenge of the Pink Panther	Guard at Cemetery	Blake Edwards	
1980	Touch and Go	Anatole	Peter Maxwell	
1981	Alison's Birthday	Uncle Dean Findlay	Ian Coughlan	
1983	Superman III	Pisa Vendor	Richard Lester	
1983	The Return of Captain Invincible	Deli Owner	Philippe Mora	
1986	Labyrinth	Goblin	Jim Henson	Voice, credited as John Bluthel
1992	Stan and George's New Life	Stan Senior	Brian McKenzie	
1995	Leapin' Leprechauns!	Michael Dennehy	Ted Nicolaou	
1996	Spellbreaker: Secret of the Leprechauns	Michael Dennehy	Ted Nicolaou	
1997	The Fifth Element	Professor Pacoli	Luc Besson	
1998	Dark City	Karl Harris	Alex Proyas	
1998	RPM	Grinkstein	Ian Sharp	
2000	Beware of Greeks Bearing Guns	Stephanos	John Tatoulis	
2004	Love's Brother	Pepe	Jan Sardi	
2008	Pigeonhole	Old Man	Nicole Tanzabel	Short
2014	Milk & Honey	Umberto	Andrea Demetriades; Louisa Mignone	Short
2016	Hail, Caesar!	Prof. Marcuse	Joel and Ethan Coen	
2017	Jungle	Uncle Nissim	Greg McLean	

=== TV series ===
Year	Title	Role	Notes
1958	Miss Mabel	The Gardener	Television film
1959	Lady in Danger	Inspector Marsh	Television film
1960	Man in a Blue Vase	Herman	Television film
1960	Citizen James	Charlie	5 episodes
1961	Sykes and A...	Mr. Kelly	3.04 "Sykes and a Bath"; 4.01 "Sykes and a Mission"
1961–1963	It's a Square World	Various Characters	14 episodes
1961	Hancock	Radio voice	1.03 "The Radio Ham"
1962–1963	Fireball XL5	Commander Wilbur Zero; Jock Campbell; Various Characters	39 episodes
1963	The Benny Hill Show	Willie The Kid	2.06 "The Shooting of Willie the Kid"
1963	Best of Friends		01.03 "Stars and Strife"
1963	The Larkins	Martinez	5.01 "Cafe Ole"
1964–1965	The Mavis Bramston Show	Various	
1964	Festival	Justin Thyme	1.25 "Justin Thyme"
1964	A Child's Guide to Screenwriting	Various	Voice, Television film
1964	HMS Paradise	Gus	1.11 "And a Happy Bastille Day to You Too"
1964	ITV Play of the Week		10.15 "Drill Pig"
1964	The Saint	Guido Naccaro	3.13 "The Damsel in Distress"
1965	Night Train to Surbiton	Ward	Television miniseries
1965	The Saint	Ziggy Zaglan	3.23 "The Happy Suicide"
1965	Not Only... But Also		1.07 "Episode #1.7"
1965	The Avengers	Ivenko	4.12 "Two's a Crowd"
1967	Armchair Theatre	Emmanuel "Manny" Cohen	7.04 "Never Mind the Quality, Feel the Width"
1967	The Baron	Giuseppe Borzo	1.26 "The Long Long Day"
1967–1971	Never Mind the Quality, Feel the Width	Manny Cohen	41 episodes
1968	City '68	Arthur Somerset	1.05 "The Visitors"
1968	George and the Dragon	Salesman	3.03 "The TV Set"
1968	Man in a Suitcase	Berger	1.22 "Jigsaw Man"
1968	ITV Playhouse	Kondu	1.28 "The Brahmin Widow"
1969	Q5	Various characters	4 episodes
1969	All Star Comedy Carnival	Manny Cohen	Television film
1970	Oh In Colour	Various characters	6 episodes
1972–1973	Milligan in...	Various characters	1.01 "Milligan in Autumn"; 1.02 "Milligan in Winter"; 1.03 "Milligan in Spring"
1973	The Pathfinders	Corporal John Tredinnick	1.12 "Nightmare"
1973	Matlock Police	Eric Sumner	3.108 "How Does Your Garden Grow?"
1973–1976	BBC2 Playhouse	Sam Nicholls / Mr. Mockler / Lieberman / Dr. Einstein	4 episodes
1974	Sykes	Henry	3.04 "The Band"
1974	The Last Turkey in the Shop Show	Various characters	Short film
1974	Charles Dickens' World of Christmas		Television film
1975	The Goodies	Major Cheeseburger	5.02 "Clown Virus"
1975	Comedy Playhouse	Richard Armitage	15.01 "The Melting Pot"
1975	Q6	Various characters	6 episodes
1976	Whodunnit?	General Malkol	4.06 "A Deadly Tan"
1976	The Melting Pot	Richard Armitage	1.03 "Episode #1.3"
1976	Bluey	Newsman	1.06 "Wild Goose Chase"
1977	Spaghetti Two-Step	Sidney	Television film
1977	The Off Show	Doc Holliday	1.01 "Six of One"
1978–1980	Q...	Various characters	19 episodes
1978	BBC2 Play of the Week	Gleyne	2.11 "Renoir, My Father"
1979	BBC Play of the Month	Ernest Friedman	14.06 "Design for Living"
1979	Ride on Stranger	Joseph Litchin	3 episodes
1979	The Mismatch		Television film
1979	Doctor Down Under	'Chalky' White	1.04 "I Gotta Horse"
1980	Home Sweet Home	Enzo Pacelli	26 episodes
1981	And Here Comes Bucknuckle	J.J. Forbes	6 episodes
1982	There's a Lot of It About	Various characters	6 episodes
1983	The Kenny Everett Television Show	Various characters	2 episodes
1983	Reilly, Ace of Spies	Krassin	1.09 "After Moscow"; 1.12 "Shutdown"
1984	ABC Afterschool Special		12.05 "The Great Love Experiment"
1984	Squaring the Circle	Babiuch	Television film
1984	I Thought You'd Gone	Max van Damn	1.06 "Episode #1.6"
1984	'Allo 'Allo!	Tailor	1.03 "Savile Row to the Rescue"
1985	Minder	Solly Salmon	6.03 "The Return of the Invincible Man"
1986	The Life and Loves of a She-Devil	Angus	Television miniseries
1987	Super Gran	Inside Legg The Tailor	2.13 "Supergran and the Heir Apparent"
1988	Turn on to T-Bag	Big Ed Malone	1.02 "Gangsters"
1989	T.Bag and the Revenge of the T.Set	Herr Krimper	1.05 "Hazel Knutt's Muesli Bar"
1989	Storyboard	Van der Moeuwe	4.02 "Snakes & Ladders"
1989	In Sickness and in Health	Ricky	3 episodes
1990	Bergerac	Edward Emanuelson	8.02 "My Name's Sergeant Bergerac"
1990	One Foot in the Grave	Mr. Jellinek	1.04 "I'll Retire to Bedlam"
1990	T.Bag and the Pearls of Wisdom	High Priest	1.07 "Tut Tut"
1990	Freddie and Max	Anatol Medved	1.02 "Episode #1.2"
1991	Rumpole of the Bailey	Gaston LeBlanc	6.01 "Rumpole a la Carte"
1991	Birds of a Feather	Pedro	3.13 "We'll Always Have Majorca"
1991	The Diamond Brothers: South by South East	Mr. Webber	1.3 "Strangers on a Chain"
1992	Virtual Murder	Tonu	1.04 "A Torch for Silverado"
1992	Taggart	Albert Newman	8.04 "Ring of Deceit Part One"
1992	Six Pack		TV anthology series
1993	Inspector Morse	Victor Ignotas	7.3 "Twilight of the Gods"
1994	A Pinch of Snuff	Maurice Arany	Television film
1994–2007	The Vicar of Dibley	Frank Pickle	3 series and 6 specials (20 episodes)
1994	Lovejoy	Popov	6.08 "Fruit of the Desert"
1995	Casualty	Mr. Malinowski	10.05 "Halfway House"
1995	Last of the Summer Wine	Barber	17.10 "Brushes at Dawn"
1997	Jonathan Creek	Jack Holiday	1.02 "Jack in the Box"
1998	Driven Crazy	Great Grandpa	1.06 "Listen Ear"
1999	Time and Tide	Harry	Television film
2003	Blue Heelers	Sid Harrison	10.28 "Too Good to Be True"
2005	Grange		Television film
2010–2011	Spirited	Rocco	6 episodes
