= A Touch of Grace =

Television series

- Counterclockwise from top: Shirley Booth as Grace Simpson, J. Patrick O'Malley as Herbert Morrison, Warren Berlinger as Walter Bradley, and Marian Mercer as Maya Bradley in a promotional image for A Touch of Grace.
- Genre: Sitcom
- Based on: For the Love of Ada by Vince Powell & Harry Driver
- Starring: Shirley Booth; J. Patrick O'Malley; Warren Berlinger; Marian Mercer
- Country of origin: United States
- Original language: English
- No. of seasons: 1
- No. of episodes: 13

Production
- Executive producer: Saul Turteltaub
- Producer: Bernie Orenstein
- Running time: 30 minutes
- Production company: Grace Productions

Original release
- Network: ABC
- Release: January 20 – April 21, 1973

J. Patrick O'Malley as Herbert Morrison and Shirley Booth as Grace Simpson in a promotional photo for A Touch of Grace.

A Touch of Grace is an American sitcom that was based on the British series For the Love of Ada starring Shirley Booth and J. Patrick O'Malley centering on a widow who moves in with her daughter and son-in-law and her romantic relationship with an elderly man. It aired on ABC from January 20 to April 21, 1973.

== Cast ==
- Shirley Booth as Grace Simpson
- J. Patrick O'Malley as Herbert Morrison
- Warren Berlinger as Walter Bradley
- Marian Mercer as Myra Bradley

== Synopsis ==
Recently widowed, in her 60s, living off her Social Security checks, and struggling to make a new life for herself, Grace Simpson moves in with her daughter and son-in-law, Myra and Walter Bradley. Grace is perky and young at heart, in sharp contrast to the stodgy and conservative Myra and Walter, and her presence disrupts their lives. Although Grace dates a lot, her steady boyfriend is Herbert Morrison, who works as a gravedigger. Myra and Walter disapprove of Grace's relationship with Herbert.

== Production ==
A Touch of Grace marked the return of Shirley Booth to television after the end of her long and successful run as the star of Hazel from 1961 to 1966, and it was also her last television series. Saul Turteltaub was the executive producer of the show, and Bernie Orenstein produced it. Episode directors included Carl Reiner and Bill Hobin. Writers included Turteltaub, Orenstein, Jeff Harris, Rick Mittleman, Bernie Kukoff, David Pollock, Elias Davis, and George Tibbles.

A Touch of Grace was based on the 1970-1971 British television series For the Love of Ada. It was an unusual show for its time, as it focused on an older couple falling in love at a time when American television networks were relentlessly pursuing a youthful viewership demographic. Critics viewed it as well written and well acted, and a good showcase for Shirley Booth's talents.

== Broadcast history ==
A Touch of Grace premiered on ABC on Saturday, January 20, 1973 at 8:30 P.M. It faced tough competition in its time slot from CBS's All in the Family and Bridget Loves Bernie and NBC's Emergency!. The sitcom preceded ABC's highly touted variety show The Julie Andrews Hour, which had just been moved from its Wednesday night 10:00 P.M. time slot to Saturday night at 9:00 P.M. in order to improve its marginal ratings. However, Andrews, in turn, had to compete with the highly rated CBS series The Mary Tyler Moore Show and The Bob Newhart Show. As a result, both A Touch of Grace and The Julie Andrews Hour garnered low ratings despite their critical acclaim. ABC cancelled both shows in April 1973.

ABC broadcast reruns of A Touch of Grace in prime time on Saturday evenings on April 28, 1973 and from May 12 to June 16, 1973.

== Episodes ==
No.	Title	Directed by	Written by	Original release date
1	"Pilot"	Carl Reiner	Bernie Orenstein & Saul Turteltaub	January 20, 1973
Grace moves in with Myra and Walter, and the status-conscious Myra is dismayed when she brings home a gravedigger – Herbert – who is courting her.
2	"The Weekend"	Unknown	Unknown	January 27, 1973
Grace decides to sneak away to spend a weekend at a bay-side lodge with Herbert, scandalizing Myra and Walter.
3	"The Working Girl"	Unknown	Unknown	February 3, 1973
Grace decides to look for a job, making the image-conscious Myra worry about how she will appear with Grace working – and then the job Grace takes shocks Myra.
4	"Lover's Quarrel"	Unknown	Unknown	February 10, 1973
Herbert refuses to take Grace to the annual 60-plus dance, leading to a big argument between them. Guest stars: Roy Roberts and Bill Ballance
5	"Pregnant Conversation"	Unknown	Unknown	February 17, 1973
Feeling that life is passing by quickly, Grace pressures Myra to have a child and make her a grandmother. Guest stars: Florence Lake and Doris Packer
6	"The Apartment"	Unknown	Unknown	February 24, 1973
Myra and Walter decide to generate more income by renting out the downstairs, but by the time they are finished turning it into an apartment, they have made it un-rentable.
7	"The Driving Lesson"	Unknown	Unknown	March 3, 1973
After Grace decides to finally learn to drive, her driving lessons have the household in an uproar.
8	"Saturday Night at the Movies"	Unknown	Unknown	March 17, 1973
Grace and Herbert go out to the movies on a Saturday night, and the police raid the theater they are at for showing pornographic films.
9	"The Lodge"	Unknown	Unknown	March 24, 1973
Herbert's lodge holds a surprise testimonial dinner for him.
10	"The Reunion"	Unknown	Unknown	March 31, 1973
The hero who saved Grace's late husband's life during World War II comes to visit but overstays his welcome, and Grace must figure out a polite way to get him to leave. Ian Wolfe guest-stars.
11	"The Commercial"	Unknown	Unknown	April 7, 1973
Grace does a spur-of-the-moment radio commercial, then gets caught for lying on a form she filled out afterwards saying that she has no relationship with Walter or his supermarket.
12	"The Accident"	Unknown	Unknown	April 14, 1973
Grace becomes involved in a scam to sue the bus company for $600,000 for a minor accident.
13	"The Engagement"	Unknown	Unknown	April 21, 1973
Herbert has asked Grace to marry him, and after months of pressure from Myra and Walter to decide without being able to make up her mind, she finally accepts.
