= Never Mind the Quality Feel the Width (film) =

1973 British film by Ronnie Baxter

- UK theatrical poster
- Directed by: Ronnie Baxter
- Written by: Harry Driver; Vince Powell
- Produced by: Ronnie Baxter
- Starring: John Bluthal; Joe Lynch; Yootha Joyce; Wendy King
- Cinematography: Ken Hodges
- Edited by: Dev Goodman
- Music by: Ronald Cass
- Production company: EMI Films
- Distributed by: Metro-Goldwyn-Mayer
- Release date: 3 January 1973
- Running time: 88 minutes
- Country: United Kingdom
- Language: English
- Budget: $270,000

Never Mind the Quality Feel the Width is a 1973 British comedy film directed by Ronnie Baxter and starring John Bluthal, Joe Lynch, Yootha Joyce, Wendy King and Bernard Stone. It was a spin-off from the ITV television series Never Mind the Quality, Feel the Width (1967–71) about two mismatched tailors in the East End of London.

The role of Rita was played by singing ukulele player and Opportunity Knocks winner Wendy King, whose 1971 album "Ukelele Girl" can be spotted in Mrs. Finch's travel shop window.

== Plot ==
In the course of the film, Manny and Patrick hire a sexy new assistant Rita, seriously fall out after a gambling incident, experience woman trouble, find themselves burgled, and eventually end up on holiday in Rome after posing as priests.

== Cast ==
- John Bluthal as Manny Cohen
- Joe Lynch as Patrick Kelly
- Yootha Joyce as Mrs. Finch
- Wendy King as Rita
- Ann Beach as Bridie
- Eddie Byrne as Father Ignatious
- Bernard Stone as Nathan
- Bill Maynard as Larkin
- David Nettheim as rabbi
- Ivor Dean as Bishop Rourke
- David Kelly as Murphy
- Jerold Wells as tramp
- Vicki Woolf as Maria
- Hilary Farr as Gina (as Hilary Labow)
- Paddy Joyce as Riley
- Steve Plytas as Swiss Guard
- Peter Denyer as lad

== Reception ==
The Monthly Film Bulletin wrote: "Never Mind the Quality Feel the Width resembles not so much a feature film as three episodes of the original Thames TV series laid end to end. Its weak storyline (centred on Manny's dream of a trip to Israel) principally provides an excuse for a number of self-contained sketches: the clichéd funeral sequence in which the hearse rolls away and comes to rest on the river bank as the coffin slides into the water; or the genuinely funny sequence in the stonemason's yard from which Manny has ordered a statue of the Virgin Mary to replace one he's accidentally broken, with Bill Maynard's down-toearth mason providing an amusing contrast to the pomp of the surrounding monuments and tombstones. The film's faltering plot is bolstered by its heavy reliance on Irish and Jewish caricatures: Patrick drinks Guinness, plays the horses and keeps a picture of the Pope up on the wall, while Manny prefers to keep one eye on his cash-box and one on his giant photo of Moshe Dayan. As with many similar British comedies, the film's farcical elements are not enhanced by the dull and dogged naturalism of its style. "

Sky Movies wrote, "although one of the better TV spin-offs, this is not so much a feature film as three episodes strung together by a tenuous overall storyline. Indeed, the episodes, chronicling the abrasive love-hate relationship between two East London tailors – one Irish, the other Jewish – are themselves composed of sketches."

The film was considered a flop.
