= Nearest and Dearest (film) =

1972 British film by John Robins

- UK theatrical poster
- Directed by: John Robins
- Written by: Roy Bottomley; Tom Brennand
- Produced by: Michael Carreras
- Starring: Hylda Baker; Jimmy Jewel
- Cinematography: David Holmes
- Edited by: Chris Barnes
- Music by: Derek Hilton
- Production companies: Hammer Films; Granada Special Comedy
- Distributed by: Anglo-EMI (UK)
- Release date: 1973
- Running time: 86 minutes
- Country: United Kingdom
- Language: English

Nearest and Dearest is a 1972 British comedy film (released in June 1973) directed by John Robins and starring Hylda Baker and Jimmy Jewel. A spin-off from the ITV sitcom Nearest and Dearest (1968–1973), it was written by Roy Bottomley and Tom Brennand and produced by Hammer Films in conjunction with a film subsidiary of Granada TV.

Baker and Jewel are feuding brother and sister Nellie and Eli Pledge, owners of Pledge's Purer Pickles.

== Plot ==
On their father's death, Eli and Nellie Pledge inherit a pickle factory in Colne, in the north of England. The warring siblings struggle to keep the decrepit "Pledge's Purer Pickles" afloat, hampered by severe lack of funds, zero business acumen and by having inherited a workforce that is a decade beyond retirement age. While Nellie works hard to keep the business going, Eli prefers to indulge in the delights of beer, cigarettes, gambling and women.

The annual Summer holiday is soon upon them and the entire factory is closed down. Nellie takes Eli to a Blackpool boarding house run by landlady Mrs. Rowbottom, whose eyes light upon bachelor Eli. Eli though, only has eyes for the younger Freda. Eli's attempts to further his financial ambitions by marrying off Nellie to a colleague in the pickling business are challenged when Vernon Smallpiece is snatched from the altar by bailiffs for non-payment of his debts.

== Cast ==
- Hylda Baker as Nellie Pledge
- Jimmy Jewel as Eli Pledge
- Joe Gladwin as Stan
- Edward Malin as Walter
- Madge Hindle as Lily
- Norman Mitchell as Vernon Smallpiece
- Pat Ashton as Freda
- Bert Palmer as Bert
- Peter Madden as the court bailiff
- Norman Chappell as man on the bus
- Yootha Joyce as Mrs Rowbottom
- John Barrett as Joshua Pledge
- Carmel Cryan as club hostess
- Sue Hammer as Scarlet O'Hara
- Janie Collinge as Vinegar Vera
- Donald Bisset as vicar
- Kerry Jewel as Claude
- Adele Warren as Mimi la Vere, stripper
- Nosher Powell as bouncer

== Music ==
The theme music for the TV series, composed by Derek Hilton, was turned into a song for the film. It was performed by Hylda Baker who also wrote the lyrics.

== Critical reception ==
The Monthly Film Bulletin wrote: "Some venerable double entendres compete for belly laughs with Hylda Baker's malapropisms in this latest TV-sired offering. The movie still manages to come out as an interminable compilation of dirty seaside postcards, and the cosy domestic smuttiness of it all looks very tatty when hammed up over-large for the big screen."

The Radio Times Guide to Films gave the film 2/5 stars, writing: "Responsible for some of Hammer's most grisly horrors, Michael Carreras was perhaps a surprise choice to produce this spin-off from the long-running ITV comedy series. Released the year before this fondly remembered sitcom departed our screens, it provides a worthy record of the word-mangling sniping between Hylda Baker and Jimmy Jewel as they try to suppress their sibling rivalry and make a go of their father's pickle factory. Bawdy entertainment."

Sky Movies said, "a kind of bumper bundle of seaside postcard jokes, with acting honours going to Jimmy Jewel, underrated as a character actor, and Yootha Joyce, who pops up as Mrs Rowbottom."
