= Let's Have a Murder =

1950 British film by John E. Blakeley

- Directed by: John E. Blakeley
- Written by: John E. Blakeley; Harry Jackson; Robert Taylor
- Produced by: John E. Blakeley
- Starring: Jimmy Jewel; Ben Warriss; Lesley Osmond
- Cinematography: Roy Fogwell; Ernest Palmer
- Edited by: Dorothy Stimson
- Music by: Billy Butler
- Production company: Mancunian Films
- Distributed by: Mancunian Films
- Release date: 1950
- Running time: 95 minutes
- Country: United Kingdom
- Language: English

Let's Have a Murder (also known as Stick 'em Up) is a 1950 British comedy crime film directed by John E. Blakeley and starring Jimmy Jewel, Ben Warriss and Lesley Osmond. It was written by Blakeley, Harry Jackson and Robert Taylor, and made by Mancunian Films at their studios in Manchester.

== Plot ==
Two private detectives are hired to clear a friend accused of murder.

== Cast ==
- Jimmy Jewel as Jimmy Jewsbury
- Ben Warriss as Ben Warren
- June Elvin as Nurse Harrison
- Lesley Osmond as Marjorie Gordon
- Stewart Rome as Colonel Gordon
- David Greene as Professor Ralph Witkoff

== Reception ==
The Daily Film Renter wrote: "The two stars are on the screen nearly all the time, and their particular species of knock-about pantomime is admirably measured to fit the lovers of that form of humour. Even so, it could be cut with advantage, as some of the scenes and a deal of the talk tend to become monotonous."
