= Larry Martyn =

British actor (1934–1994)

- Martyn as Mr. Mash in Are You Being Served?
- Born: Lawrence Martyn; 22 March 1934; London, England
- Died: 7 August 1994 (aged 60); St Mary's Bay, Kent, England
- Years active: 1950-1992
- Spouse: Hilary Martyn

Lawrence Martyn (22 March 1934 – 7 August 1994) was a British film and television actor known for his comedy performances.

Martyn was born in London and was a member of the Parachute Regiment. He worked as a circus performer in his youth before becoming an actor regularly appearing on stage, and in films and TV. He was famous as store maintenance man "Mr. Mash" in the BBC comedy series Are You Being Served?, appearing in the first three seasons before being replaced by Arthur English. He was unable to continue in this role because he was committed to the television series Spring & Autumn with Jimmy Jewel. Other TV appearances included On the Buses, Look - Mike Yarwood!, Rising Damp, The Detectives and Grange Hill. He also played alongside Frankie Howerd in two of his BBC shows, Up Pompeii! and Whoops Baghdad.

== Career ==
Martyn replaced Graham Stark in the role of the spiv Private Walker for Series 2 and 3 of the radio version of Dad's Army after the sudden death of James Beck in 1973. His film roles included Carry On at Your Convenience, where he had a small part as the promenade rifle-range owner, and Carry On Behind, where he played an inept electrician who helps wire up the public address system at the caravan site where the film is set.

== Death ==
Martyn died on or about 7 August 1994 at home in St Mary's Bay, Kent at age 60. An inquest into his death took place 9 November 1994 where a cause of death was unascertainable and an open verdict was recorded.

== Filmography ==
- Idol on Parade (1959) - Teenager
- Too Young to Love (1960) - Minor Role (uncredited)
- Never Let Go (1960) - Len
- Deadline Midnight (1961, TV Series) - Billy Brewster
- Flame in the Streets (1961) - Second Corner Boy (uncredited)
- Partners in Crime (1961) - Pete Lake
- Never Back Losers (1961) - Clive Parker
- The Day the Earth Caught Fire (1961) - Man at Water Station (uncredited)
- The Damned (1962) - Teddy Boy (uncredited)
- On the Beat (1962) - Yob in Cafe (uncredited)
- Breath of Life (1963) - Tony
- The Great St. Trinian's Train Robbery (1966) - Chips
- Up the Junction (1968) - Barrow Boy
- Up Pompeii! (1970, TV Series) - Verminus / Spurius / Gaoler
- Carry On at Your Convenience (1971) - Rifle Range Owner
- For the Love of Ada (1971, TV Series) - Brian
- Kindly Leave the Kerb (1971, TV Series)
- Upstairs, Downstairs (1972, TV Series) - The Electrician
- Are You Being Served? (1972-1975, TV Series) - Mr. Mash
- Spring & Autumn (1972-1976, TV Series) - Brian Reid / Joe Dickinson
- Elementary, My Dear Watson (1973)
- Whoops Baghdad (1973, TV Series) - Derti Dhoti
- On the Buses (1973, TV Series) - Fred
- Look - Mike Yarwood! (1974-1976, TV Series)
- Carry On Behind (1975) - Electrician
- Don Alfonso (1975, Music film by Mike Oldfield) - Don Alfonso
- A Sharp Intake of Breath (1980, TV Series) - Barry Penders
- Omen III: The Final Conflict (1981) - Orator
- Grange Hill (1981, TV Series) - Bus Conductor
- West End Tales (1981, TV Series) - Checkie
- Minder (1982, TV Series) - Smith
- Don't Wait Up (1983, TV Series) - Garage mechanic
- Slinger's Day (1986, TV Series) - 1st Man Customer
- High & Dry (1987, TV Series) - Electricity Board Inspector
- The Bill (1989-1993, TV Series) - Pub Landlord / Landlord / Greengrocer / Norman Harris (final appearance)
- The Detectives (1993, TV Series) - Stable Hand

== Radio ==
'The Random Jottings of Hinge & Bracket ', ('The Coalman Commeth') - ( 3 August 1986) - Coalman.. Dad's Army Private Walker 1973 Replaced James Beck
