= For the Love of Ada (film) =

1972 film by Ronnie Baxter

- UK theatrical poster
- Directed by: Ronnie Baxter
- Written by: Harry Driver; Vince Powell
- Produced by: Peter J. Thompson
- Starring: Irene Handl; Wilfred Pickles; Barbara Mitchell; Jack Smethurst
- Cinematography: Alan Hume
- Edited by: Anthony Palk
- Music by: Frank Barber
- Production company: Tigon British Film Productions
- Distributed by: LMG Film Productions Limited UK
- Release date: August 1972
- Running time: 88 min
- Country: United Kingdom
- Language: English
- Budget: £100,000

For the Love of Ada is a 1972 British comedy film directed by Ronnie Baxter and starring Irene Handl, Wilfred Pickles, Barbara Mitchell and Jack Smethurst. It was written by Harry Driver and Vince Powell as a spin-off from the television series For the Love of Ada (1970–1971).

== Plot ==
Walter and Ada Bingley, an elderly couple, are about to celebrate their first wedding anniversary. To celebrate, their family, friends and neighbours plan a surprise party.

Their daughter Ruth entrusts her husband Leslie Pollitt with the organisation. They hire a traditional club hall for the event.

On the night though Walter and Ada do their own thing and the party goes on without them. With most of the alcohol consumed a traditional knees-up begins. Leslie eventually finds them and drags them in for a meal, but they have already eaten.

== Cast ==
- Irene Handl as Ada Bingley
- Wilfred Pickles as Walter Bingley
- Barbara Mitchell as Ruth Pollitt
- Jack Smethurst as Leslie Pollitt
- Arthur English as Arthur
- Larry Martyn as Brian
- Hilda Braid as Mrs Armitage
- Andria Lawrence as Sandra
- David Collings as Mr Johnson
- John Boxer as vicar
- Nancy Nevinson as Elsie Lockwood
- Norman Atkyns as Charlie Nugent
- Donald Bisset as Mr Chapman
- Duggie Brown as Duggie
- Johnnie Wade as Alan
- Veronica Doran as Carol
- Gareth Hunt as Police Constable
- Nicholas Ram as Anthony Pollitt
- Cecily Hullett as Freda Skinner
- Rose Power, Jean Marlow, Rose Hill and Brian Tully as mourners

== Reception ==
The Monthly Film Bulletin wrote: "'What could be nicer,' Gilbert O'Sullivan croons questioningly over the credit titles, 'than two people young at heart?' The answer provided by the film, of course, as Irene Handl and Wilfred Pickles demonstrate how very nice, how indomitably life-loving, how British and human and working-class they are, is nothing whatsoever. Adapted from the TV comedy series, For the Love of Ada is a boneless jelly of a film, setting up pointless little heartbreaks and conflicts so that it can dissolve them in a flood of cosy sentimentality. Absolutely nothing happens from beginning to end, but every cliché in the book is given a whirl, from the wife who thinks her anniversary has been forgotten, to the husband who draws back in panic when his slobbering efforts at flirtation seem likely to bear fruit, right down to the climactic 'Knees Up Mother Brown'. Like Pavlov's dogs, the characters shed tears or grin and bear it to appropriate stimuli, but life in this ghastly, thoroughly patronising concoction is reduced to a conditioned reflex."

In The Radio Times Guide to Films David Parkinson gave the film 2/5 stars, writing: "The 70-something romance of Ada Cresswell and Walter Bingley never made for scintillating sitcom viewing, even though the 1970 TV series was popular in its day. This movie spin-off, set on the couple's first wedding anniversary, is leisurely in the extreme, as the writers struggle to fill the extra hour. While the by-play between widow Irene Handl and Wilfred Pickles (as the gravedigger who'd buried her husband) is engaging enough, this may be too gentle for modern tastes."
