= The Wackers (TV series) =

British television sitcom (1975)

- Series title card
- Genre: Sitcom
- Written by: Vince Powell
- Directed by: Anthony Parker
- Starring: Ken Jones; Sheila Fay; David Casey; Alison Steadman; Keith Chegwin; Bill Dean; Joe Gladwin; Pearl Hackney
- Country of origin: United Kingdom
- Original language: English
- No. of series: 1
- No. of episodes: 7 (1 unaired)

Production
- Producer: Anthony Parker
- Camera setup: Multi-camera
- Running time: 30 minutes
- Production company: Thames Television

Original release
- Network: ITV
- Release: 19 March – 23 April 1975

The Wackers is a British television sitcom that was first broadcast on ITV from 19 March to 23 April 1975. It was written by Vince Powell, and starred Ken Jones, Sheila Fay, David Casey, Alison Steadman, Keith Chegwin, Bill Dean, Joe Gladwin and Pearl Hackney. It followed the lives and interactions of the Clarksons, a Liverpudlian family living in the poor area of Dingle.

It was the first series to be written solely by Powell, following the death of his writing partner Harry Driver in 1973. The series was heavily criticised in the press for its offensive humour, resulting in its cancellation before the final episode had aired.

== Premise ==
Billy Clarkson returns home to his family, after serving two years in prison for petty larceny. His wife Mary, meanwhile, informed the family that he was "at sea"; upon his return, they reveal they already knew he was in prison. Home once again, Billy attempts to reintegrate into his family – divided by football teams and religion – and the outside world.

== Cast ==
=== Main ===
- Ken Jones as Billy Clarkson
- Shelia Fay as Mary Clarkson
- David Casey as Tony Clarkson
- Alison Steadman as Bernadette Clarkson
- Keith Chegwin as Raymond Clarkson
- Bill Dean as Charlie

=== Recurring ===
- Joe Gladwin as Joe Farrell
- Pearl Hackney as Maggie Clarkson

== Episodes ==
No.	Title	Directed and produced by	Written by	Original release date
1	"Out of the Frying Pan"	Anthony Parker	Vince Powell	19 March 1975
2	"A Licence to Love"	Anthony Parker	Vince Powell	26 March 1975
3	"Everybody's Doing It"	Anthony Parker	Vince Powell	2 April 1975
4	"The Root of All Evil"	Anthony Parker	Vince Powell	9 April 1975
5	"No Rest for the Wicked"	Anthony Parker	Vince Powell	16 April 1975
6	"Nearly Gone But Not Forgotten"	Anthony Parker	Vince Powell	23 April 1975
7	"Up the Reds"	Anthony Parker	Vince Powell	Unaired

== Production ==
The title is derived from the term "wacker" or "whacker", which was a name commonly used to refer to Liverpudlians up until the 1960s. The series was the first written solely by Vince Powell, following the death of writing partner Harry Driver on 25 November 1973. It was produced by the London-based Thames Television, to which Powell was employed as a comedy consultant. Philip Jones, the head of light entertainment at Thames, admired Powell's idea and his previous expertise in sitcom writing, and commissioned a full series, rather than a pilot. Although born in Manchester, Powell had lived in Liverpool for four years, so he had an understanding of Liverpudlian humour. To promote the series, producer Anthony Parker stated to the press that "whether the Clarksons are arguing about birth control or sex, we're not going for cheap laughs, but for reality. This is strong demanding stuff; it is hard hitting and explicit, but we are showing a family exactly as it is".

Ken Jones and Shelia Fay, who portrayed married couple Billy and Mary Clarkson respectively, were married in real life. Jones, Fay, Keith Chegwin, Bill Dean and Alison Steadman were all born in Liverpool. Pearl Hackney, though not born in Liverpool, spent much of her early life there.

=== Cancellation ===
Following severe press criticism of the series, including pressure from Mary Whitehouse, the president of the National Viewers' and Listeners' Association, Jones told producer Anthony Parker to remove all crude references from each episode. Powell and Parker refused, seeking advice from Jeremy Isaacs, the Controller of Programming at Thames. Isaacs suggested that Powell and Parker nominate one episode they deemed more offensive than the rest; that episode would not be aired and the remaining six episodes would be broadcast without censorship. However, despite withdrawing the episode, the series was soon cancelled. The unaired episode, titled "Up the Reds", was broadcast for the first time in Australia, on 13 July 1976 on New South Wales-based channels and ABC-TV, and was eventually released on DVD in 2013. Robert Sellers, writing in Raising Laugher (2019), noted that Powell remained proud of the series despite its controversy, believing it to be "a probable forerunner" for the later Liverpool-based sitcom Bread (1986–1991).

To fill the schedules caused by the programme's cancellation, My Son Reuben (1976), another sitcom scripted by Powell and produced by Parker, was commissioned by Thames. It ran for one series.

== Release ==
=== Broadcast ===
The series was first broadcast on ITV from 19 March to 23 April 1975; one episode, scheduled for 30 April, went unaired. In Australia, the whole series, including the unaired seventh episode, was broadcast between June and July 1976, on several channels, including: NRN-11, RTN-8 and ABDN-2 in New South Wales, and ABC-TV nationally.

=== Home media release ===
The series was first released on DVD in Region 2 on 20 October 2013 by Network Distributing. The release included the unaired seventh episode.

== Reception ==
An unspecified contemporary newspaper surveyed people of Liverpool, asking whether they loved or hated the programme, with a fifty-fifty split being recorded. The Guardian's Nancy Banks-Smith, upon viewing the first episode on 20 March 1975, was critical of the series, likening the show and its title as "like something you step in if you don't look where you're going". British television critics described the show as "making Alf Garnett look like something out of Enid Blyton". Upon the airing of the first episode in Australia, John Pinkney, writing for The Age on 4 June 1976, described the show as being "a half-hour lavatory joke that's hardly worth the toilet paper on which it seems to have been written", while 116 Australian viewers phoned in demanding the show be cancelled. Mark Lewisohn, writing in the Radio Times Guide to TV Comedy (2003), stated that the series was "not a success" and that audiences "grew tired of its incontinence jokes". Robert Sellers, writing in Raising Laughter (2021), noted that "the press turned on the show, calling it out for its vulgar humour and hackneyed stereotypes of Liverpool people".
