= She Knows Y'Know =

1962 British film by Montgomery Tully

She Knows Y'know
- Directed by: Montgomery Tully
- Written by: Montgomery Tully; Maurice J. Wilson
- Based on: play by Kate Sullivan
- Produced by: Maurice J. Wilson
- Starring: Hylda Baker; Cyril Smith
- Cinematography: James Wilson
- Edited by: Maurice Rootes
- Music by: Ken Thorne
- Production company: Eternal Films
- Distributed by: Grand National Pictures (UK)
- Release date: June 1962 (UK)
- Running time: 72 minutes
- Country: United Kingdom
- Language: English

She Knows Y'Know is a 1962 black and white British comedy film directed by Montgomery Tully and starring Hylda Baker and Cyril Smith. It was written by Tully and Maurice J. Wilson. The film takes its title from Baker's best-known catchphrase. The BFI describes the film, which was made on a low-budget, as a "low life comedy, unfolded against an industrial town backdrop".

== Plot ==
In the North of England in the 1950s, the lives of two very different families become entwined. The Worswicks are a working class family led by domineering mother Hylda with husband Joe and academically bright son Leslie. Neighbours the Smallhopes are aspiring middle class, led by mother Euphemia and husband Clarence, with attractive daughter Marilyn, whose sudden pregnancy is the catalyst for unfolding dramas involving both families.

== Cast ==
- Hylda Baker as Hylda Worswick
- Cyril Smith as Joe Worswick
- Joe Gibbons as Charlie Todger
- Peter Myers as Leslie Worswick
- Linda Castle as Marilyn Smallhope
- Tim Connor as Terry Roy
- Neil Wilson as Clarence Smallhope
- Joan Sanderson as Euphemia Smallhope
- Alfred Burke as Mr Fox
- Lucy Griffiths as Jenny Higginbottom
- Leonard Sachs as John Dawson
- Patricia Shakesby as Valerie

== Critical reception ==
Monthly Film Bulletin said "Hearty over-acting from Hylda Baker cannot prevent this being just one more conveyor-belt North Country farce. All the old familiar jokes and situations are affectionately preserved, with a pop singer and coffee bar thrown in to prove that the film’s makers are bang up to date with the mood of the fifties."

TV Guide described it as a "mindless sex comedy ...Typical ribald British innuendoes abound."

AllMovie described it as a "lively British sex farce."

== Restoration ==
In the Blackpool Gazette, Jacqui Morley wrote about the film restoration by Eurwyn Jones:

Eurwyn sees Hylda's film She Knows Y'Know as one of the holy grails of British comedy. "We've lost so much over the years and I'm convinced many are still out there. You have to know where to look. Jean [Fergusson] tried the BFI, but the film wasn't in good condition so I put feelers out as a past film collector and went, let us say, to see a man about a dog! I found the film in immaculate condition. Nobody had watched it for half a century. It was a really good feeling, and I couldn't wait to see it."

He negotiated use of the print, tracked down copyright holders to ensure it could be shared with fans across the world, and teamed up with Renown Pictures, who restore classic movies, putting the print through modern technology to present a crystal clear picture quality and sound. She Knows Y'Know is now out on DVD.

Eurwyn concludes: "Hylda was one of the funniest women ever. All those hours I've spent tracking down this early example of her talent have been worth it, and the digital transfer results are brilliant. The film shows she was not only a brilliant comedienne, but an actress of great note, too, which she later proved in films such as Up the Junction [1968] and Oliver [1968]."
