= Jo Warne =

British actress (1938–2017)

- Warne as Peggy Mitchell in EastEnders
- Born: Josephine Margaret Warne; 2 January 1938; Hammersmith, London, England
- Died: 13 January 2017 (aged 79); Sandown, Isle of Wight, England
- Occupation: Actress
- Years active: 1970–1998
- Television: EastEnders (1991); Grange Hill (1991–1996)

Josephine Margaret Warne (2 January 1938 – 13 January 2017), better known as Jo Warne, was an English actress, who briefly played Peggy Mitchell in the BBC soap opera EastEnders, making her first appearance on 30 April 1991. She appeared in a total of 10 episodes between April and July 1991, as part of Sam Mitchell (Danniella Westbrook) and Ricky Butcher's (Sid Owen) teen elopement storyline. Barbara Windsor later took on the full-time role of Peggy until the character's death in 2016.

Warne appeared in the last episode of the 1970s police series The Sweeney as Gloria Bartley, Jack Regan's ex-girlfriend. She was a regular cast member in the series Spring & Autumn from 1973–1976, playing Betty Harris. In 1980, she played Martha Styles in an episode of Lady Killers. She also appeared in an episode of the drama Minder (1980), ITV's Hammer House of Horror in the episode The House That Bled to Death, episode 8 of The Bill.

She made several appearances in various series of T-Bag during the 1980s – early 1990s, and appeared in Series 8 of Bodger and Badger as Mrs Bobbins. Between 1991 and 1996 she played Julie Corrigan's mother in Grange Hill and in 1997 took small roles in episodes of Where the Heart Is and Chalk. Her film credits included roles in Nutcracker (1982), Little Dorrit (1987) and Consuming Passions (1988).

Warne died on 13 January 2017 on the Isle of Wight.
