= Best of Enemies (TV series) =

British comedy TV series (1968–1969)

- Derek Guyler, Tim Barrett and Robert Coote
- Genre: Comedy
- Written by: Harry Driver; Vince Powell
- Starring: Robert Coote; Tim Barrett; Deryck Guyler
- Country of origin: United Kingdom
- Original language: English
- No. of series: 1
- No. of episodes: 5

Production
- Producer: Alan Tarrant
- Running time: 30 minutes
- Production company: Thames Television

Original release
- Network: ITV
- Release: 6 August 1968 – 16 July 1969

Best of Enemies is a British comedy television series which first aired on ITV between 6 August 1968 and 16 July 1969. Rival Conservative and Labour MP's are forced to share an office in the Houses of Parliament. The two characters are inversions of their stereotypes with the Tory a more modest man who rides a bicycle while his Labour counterpart drives an expensive jaguar. Coote had already portrayed an MP in the 1967 series The Whitehall Worrier, with which it shared a gentler humour.

All episodes are believed to be lost.

== Cast ==
- Robert Coote as Willie Gordon MP
- Tim Barrett as Geoffrey Broom MP
- Deryck Guyler as Wilkins
- Jay Denyer as Policeman
- Ann Lancaster as Mrs. Ewing
- Geoffrey Palmer as Johnson
- Jill Dixon as Rowena Gordon
- Angela Ryder as Miss Fifi

== Bibliography ==
- Steven Fielding. A State of Play: British Politics on Screen, Stage and Page, from Anthony Trollope to The Thick of It. A&C Black, 2014.
