= Home Sweet Home (Australian TV series) =

Australian television series

- Created by: Vince Powell
- Starring: John Bluthal; Arianthe Galani; Christopher Bell; Carmen Tanti; Miles Buchanan
- Country of origin: Australia
- No. of episodes: 24

Production
- Running time: 30 minutes

Original release
- Network: ABC TV
- Release: 6 October 1980 – 1982

Home Sweet Home is a 1980 Australian comedy television series produced by the Australian Broadcasting Corporation, starring John Bluthal.

The series was created by Vince Powell, and the pilot was produced by Michael Mills. William Motzing wrote the music.

Writers for the series included: Powell, Charles Stamp, Ralph Peterson, Ian Heydon, David Dorimo and Hugh Stuckey

== Cast ==
=== Main / regular ===
- John Bluthal as Enzo Pacelli
- Arianthe Galani as Maria Pacelli (Enzo's wife)
- Christopher Bell as Bobby Pacelli (their older son, a young adult)
- Carmen Tanti as Anna Pacelli (their daughter, an older teenager / young adult)
- Miles Buchanan as Tony Pacelli (their younger son, high school aged)
- Edmund Pegge as Father Murphy
- Maria Rosa Cerizza as "Sofia" (Mama)
- Donald MacDonald as Father Kelly
- Andrew Bond as Marcello Pacelli

=== Guests ===
- Lex Marinos as Radio Announcer (1 episode)
- Peter Whitford as Doctor aa Mike Furnont (1 episode)
- Reg Lye as Arthur (1 episode)
- Roger Ward as Billy (1 episode)

== Plot ==
Enzo and Maria Pacelli migrated from Italy to Australia with their three children.

Enzo is a taxi driver who wants to continue to do things the Italian way, but his Australian educated children are more interested in Australian culture.
