= George and the Dragon (TV series) =

British sitcom

- First series title card
- Created by: Vince Powell and Harry Driver
- Starring: Sid James; Peggy Mount; John Le Mesurier; Keith Marsh
- No. of series: 4
- No. of episodes: 26

Production
- Running time: 26 minutes per episode
- Production company: ATV

Original release
- Network: ITV
- Release: 19 November 1966 – 31 October 1968

George and the Dragon is a British sitcom made by ATV for the ITV network which was transmitted in four series comprising 26 episodes between 19 November 1966 and 31 October 1968.

The regular cast was Sid James, Peggy Mount, John Le Mesurier and Keith Marsh. The show was written by Harry Driver and Vince Powell; Shaun O'Riordan was the director, and Alan Tarrant was the main producer.

== Outline ==
George Russell (James), a handyman and chauffeur, and Gabrielle Dragon (Mount), a housekeeper, are both employed by Colonel Maynard (Le Mesurier). Also among the staff is Ralph (Marsh), a gardener. George's lascivious behaviour has been responsible for the resignation of 16 previous housekeepers, but Gabrielle, a formidable widow in her forties, will have none of it. The two leading characters are frequently at crossed swords with each other and George regularly schemes to remove her from her job.

Mount herself was unlike the 'battleaxe' characters she tended to play, and had known James for many years by the time of this series. They had worked together in the screen adaptation of the Brian Rix-associated farce Dry Rot (1956). Mount reminded James of his own mother, while Mount found James a convivial colleague. It was while the second series was in production on 13 May 1967 that James had his first heart attack.

== Cast ==
- Sid James as George Russell
- Peggy Mount as Gabrielle Dragon
- John Le Mesurier as Colonel Maynard
- Keith Marsh as Ralph

== DVD release ==
Unlike many British television series of its era, George and the Dragon survives in its entirety with no episodes missing, and has been issued as a DVD boxset.
