= Kerry Jewel =

British theatre producer

Kerry J J Marsh
- Born: 1947 (age 78–79); Marylebone, London, England
- Known for: Kerry Jewels
- Children: 2

Kerry Jewel is a British theatre producer. He has produced a large number of shows in collaboration with his wife Elyse, notably Pan, an adaptation of Peter Pan.

He had two sons, Dean and Dale. Dale died in 1998 in an accident working on a production of the Rocky Horror Picture Show.
