= Nearest and Dearest =

British TV sitcom (1968–1973)

- Cover of the DVD release of the first series
- Created by: Vince Powell; Harry Driver
- Starring: Hylda Baker; Jimmy Jewel; Madge Hindle; Edward Malin; Joe Gladwin
- No. of series: 7
- No. of episodes: 45

Production
- Running time: 30 mins. (inc. commercials)
- Production company: Granada Television

Original release
- Network: ITV
- Release: 15 August 1968 – 7 February 1973

Related
- Not On Your Nellie

Nearest and Dearest is a British television sitcom that ran from 1968 to 1973. A total of 45 episodes were made, 18 in monochrome (black & white) and 27 in colour. The series, produced by Granada Television for the ITV network, starred Hylda Baker and Jimmy Jewel as squabbling middle-aged siblings Nellie and Eli Pledge who ran a family pickle business in Colne, Lancashire, in the North West of England.

== Series premise and history ==
The first episode set up the premise: in his will, Joshua Pledge bequeathed a large sum of money to his middle-aged son and daughter... but only if they stay together for five years at his small pickle business, Pledge's Purer Pickles. However, hard-working spinster Nellie and her ne'er-do-well womanising brother Eli rarely saw eye-to-eye. Nellie was played by comedian Hylda Baker, who was born and bred in Farnworth, 11 miles north of Manchester. Eli was played by Jimmy Jewel, a Yorkshire-born contemporary of Baker who had made his name with Ben Warriss in the music hall (vaudeville) act Jewel and Warriss.

Also featured was the Pledges' second-cousin Lily Tattersall, who was married to constantly-mute octogenarian Walter. Walter was unable to control his bladder, which led to one of the programme's oft-used catchphrases, "Has he been?". Lily was played by Madge Hindle, Walter by Edward Malin. Another regular character was the Pledges' toothless, cloth-capped old foreman, Stan Hardman (Joe Gladwin).

Much of the comedy was derived from Nellie's constant malapropisms. When asked by Lily if she knew the facts of life, Nellie replied with immense dignity, "Of course I do! I'm well over the age of content!" In another episode, Nellie has a suitor named Vernon Smallpiece, whom she addresses as 'Vermin Bigpiece'. When Eli insists on playing the high-powered executive once he is in charge of the pickle business, Nellie asks him who he thinks he is "sat sitting there like a big business typhoon!" In each episode, Nellie and Eli would hurl insults at each other to spectacular effect, as they fought over the family business or domestic matters, with Nellie's constant nagging and Eli's constant drinking and womanising fuelling their arguments. It was known that the insults continued off-screen as well, as Baker and Jewel disliked each other intensely in real life, their working relationship being described as "the most toxic in the whole of British sitcom history". In later episodes, Baker struggled to remember her lines and relied on cue cards and prompting from co-star Madge Hindle. After she retired from acting, Baker would suffer greatly with dementia during her final years.

The third series, transmitted in October and November 1969, was the first to be recorded in colour, but given that ITV began broadcasting in colour from 15 November 1969, no viewers would have seen these in colour on their first run until 15 November. An industrial dispute at ITV in 1971, known as the Colour Strike, led to seven of the eight programmes from the fifth series being made in black-and-white.

== Cast ==
- Hylda Baker as Nellie Pledge
- Jimmy Jewel as Eli Pledge
- Joe Gladwin as Stan Hardman
- Madge Hindle as Lily Tattersall
- Edward Malin as Walter Tattersall
- Freddie Rayner as Grenville (series 2 to 7)
- Bert Palmer (series 1) and Leslie Sarony (series 2) as Bert Taylor

== Episode list ==
=== Series 1 (1968) ===
No. overall	No. in series	Title	Original release date
1	1	"It Comes to Us All"	15 August 1968
2	2	"Lead Me to the Altar"	22 August 1968
3	3	"The Danger List"	29 August 1968
4	4	"Take a Letter"	5 September 1968
5	5	"You Make Me Feel So Young"	12 September 1968
6	6	"The Wrong Side of the Sheets"	19 September 1968

=== Series 2 (1969) ===
No. overall	No. in series	Title	Original release date
7	1	"Breach of the Peace"	8 July 1969
8	2	"Wish You Were Here"	15 July 1969
9	3	"The Demon Drink"	22 July 1969
10	4	"All You Wish Yourself"	29 July 1969
11	5	"Now Is the Hour"	5 August 1969

=== Series 3 (1969) ===
No. overall	No. in series	Title	Original release date
12	1	"What Seems to Be the Trouble?"	9 October 1969
13	2	"The Birds and the Bees"	16 October 1969
14	3	"Get Up Them Stairs"	23 October 1969
15	4	"The Power Behind the Throne"	30 October 1969
16	5	"Getting to Know You"	6 November 1969
17	6	"Two Pennies to Rub Together"	13 November 1969
18	7	"The Ghost of Picklers Past"	26 December 1969

=== Series 4 (1970) ===
No. overall	No. in series	Title	Original release date
19	1	"A Price on Your Head"	14 May 1970
20	2	"A Young Man's Fancy"	21 May 1970
21	3	"When You've Got to Go"	28 May 1970
22	4	"When Love Walks In"	4 June 1970
23	5	"An Open and Shut Case"	11 June 1970

=== Series 5 (1970–71) ===
No. overall	No. in series	Title	Original release date
24	1	"Make Yourself at Home"	17 December 1970
25	2	"Compliments of the Season"	24 December 1970
26	3	"Barefaced in the Park"	14 January 1971
27	4	"A Man and a Woman"	21 January 1971
28	5	"Bottoms Up"	28 January 1971
29	6	"X Marks the Spot"	11 February 1971
30	7	"Something in the Night"	18 February 1971
31	8	"Lucky for Some"	25 February 1971

=== Series 6 (1972) ===
No. overall	No. in series	Title	Original release date
32	1	"For Better, for Worse"	1 June 1972
33	2	"A Place in the Sun"	8 June 1972
34	3	"The Female of the Species"	15 June 1972
35	4	"Worker's Playtime"	29 June 1972
36	5	"The Right Spirit"	6 July 1972
37	6	"A Question of Taste"	13 July 1972
38	7	"A Pair of Bloomers"	20 July 1972

=== Series 7 (1972–73) ===
No. overall	No. in series	Title	Original release date
39	1	"Cindernellie"	21 December 1972
40	2	"Good Time Girl"	28 December 1972
41	3	"The French Disconnection"	11 January 1973
42	4	"Get Out of That"	18 January 1973
43	5	"The One That Got Away"	24 January 1973
44	6	"The Visit"	31 January 1973
45	7	"Far from the Madding Pong"	7 February 1973

== Spin-offs and remake ==
In 1972, the main cast appeared in a film version of the series that was made by Hammer Films. The film included a vocal version of the series' theme tune sung by Hylda Baker.

In 1973, the series was adapted for the American market. Renamed Thicker Than Water, it starred Julie Harris and Richard Long as squabbling siblings Nellie and Ernie Paine, however, the US version was not successful and was cancelled after only 13 episodes.

== After Nearest and Dearest ==
After the series ended in 1973, Baker went on to star in the sitcom Not On Your Nellie (made for ITV by London Weekend Television) in which Lancashire-born Nellie Pickersgill (the same character as Nellie Pledge in all but name) travels to London to run her ailing father's pub, the Brown Cow. In a 1973 interview with Baker (available on the seventh-series DVD of Nearest & Dearest), she stated that the forthcoming Not on Your Nellie series was actually a spinoff from Nearest and Dearest and would follow Nellie's exploits in London after Eli practically deserts her. This would appear to follow on from the final episode of Nearest and Dearest in which Stan informed Nellie and Eli that there was an explosion at the pickling shed, implying that Pledge's Purer Pickles was now defunct. However, possibly due to an issue over legal rights regarding the Nellie Pledge character, Not on Your Nellie was ultimately made as an "original" new series rather than a spinoff, despite the obvious similarities between the two.

Meanwhile, Jewel went on to appear in the sitcom Spring and Autumn (1973–1976), about a friendship between a lonely boy and an elderly man, created by Nearest and Dearest creators Vince Powell and Harry Driver. Jewel continued to work in television for many years, and in 1991 he appeared in an episode of the BBC hospital drama series Casualty in which he was able to use one of his famous catchphrases, referring to a nurse as "a knock-kneed, knackered old nose bag" – a term he had regularly bestowed upon Nellie.

Harry Driver, who created and wrote many episodes of the series with Vince Powell, died on 25 November 1973, just nine months after the series ended, aged only 42—marking the abrupt end of a successful 13-year writing partnership with Powell. Edward Malin, who played Walter, was the first of the cast to die, on 1 March 1977, four years after the show ended. Hylda Baker spent her final years penniless and battling dementia, and died in a nursing home on 1 May 1986 of bronchial pneumonia, aged 81. Joe Gladwin, who played Stan, went on to other television roles, most notably Wally Batty in the long-running sitcom Last of the Summer Wine, a role he played until his death on 11 March 1987. Jimmy Jewel continued to work in a variety of roles in both theatre and television until his death on 3 December 1995, the day before his 86th birthday. Co-creator Vince Powell died on 13 July 2009, aged 80.

Madge Hindle, the sole surviving member of the cast, went on to become a series regular in Coronation Street from 1976 to 1980, playing Renee Roberts, the wife of grocer Alf Roberts. Since then Hindle has worked in a variety of roles in television and stage.

== DVD releases ==
All seven series of Nearest And Dearest (in separate editions and also a 7-disc box set) have been released on DVD by Network. The 1972 film has also been released on DVD by DD Video.

== See also ==
- List of films based on British television series
