= Two in Clover =

British TV sitcom (1969–1970)

- Two in Clover titles as used in the second (colour) series.
- Genre: Sitcom
- Created by: Vince Powell; Harry Driver
- Starring: Sid James; Victor Spinetti
- Country of origin: United Kingdom
- Original language: English
- No. of series: 2
- No. of episodes: 13

Production
- Producer: Alan Tarrant
- Running time: 30 minutes
- Production company: Thames Television

Original release
- Network: ITV
- Release: 18 February 1969 – 24 March 1970

Two in Clover is a British sitcom that ran for two series from 1969 to 1970. It starred Sid James and Victor Spinetti and was written by Bless This House writing duo Vince Powell and Harry Driver. It was produced and directed by Alan Tarrant. The first series was made in black and white and the second series was made in colour.

It was made by Thames Television for the ITV network.

== Plot ==
Two city clerks, Sid Turner and Vic Evans abandon the nine-to-five to run a small farm out in the country. A recurring theme throughout the two series was Sid's love of his Friesian cow "Fanny".

== Cast ==
- Sidney James as Sid Turner (13 episodes)
- Victor Spinetti as Vic Evans (12 episodes)
- Bill Pertwee as policeman (5 episodes)
- Victor Platt as landlord (4 episodes)
- Gerald Flood as Gerald Bromley-Jones (2 episodes)

Notable guest stars include James Beck, Hermione Baddeley, John Le Mesurier, John Inman, Richard Davies as Vic's Welsh nationalist brother David and Fred Trueman as himself.

== Episodes ==
=== Series One (1969) ===
- 1.1. Series 1, Episode 1 (18 February 1969)
- 1.2. Series 1, Episode 2 (25 February 1969)
- 1.3. Series 1, Episode 3 (4 March 1969)
- 1.4. Series 1, Episode 4 (11 March 1969)
- 1.5. Series 1, Episode 5 (18 March 1969)
- 1.6. Series 1, Episode 6 (25 March 1969)
- 1.7. Series 1, Episode 7 (1 April 1969)

=== Series Two (1970) ===
- 2.1. Series 2, Episode 1 (10 February 1970)
- 2.2. Series 2, Episode 2 (17 February 1970)
- 2.3. Series 2, Episode 3 (24 February 1970)
- 2.4. Series 2, Episode 4 (3 March 1970)
- 2.5. Series 2, Episode 5 (17 March 1970)
- 2.6. Series 2, Episode 6 (24 March 1970)

== DVD releases ==
Both series of Two in Clover were released on DVD by Network in 2004.
