= Never Mind the Quality, Feel the Width =

British television sitcom (1967–1971)

- Genre: Sitcom
- Created by: Vince Powell; Harry Driver
- Starring: John Bluthal; Joe Lynch; Bernard Spear; Cyril Shaps; Eamon Kelly
- Country of origin: United Kingdom
- No. of series: 6 (+ pilot)
- No. of episodes: 41 (including mini Christmas special)

Production
- Producers: Leonard White; Ronnie Baxter; Stuart Allen; Alan Tarrant
- Running time: 30 minutes
- Production companies: ABC Weekend TV (pilot + series 1–2); Thames Television (series 3–6)

Original release
- Network: ITV
- Release: 18 February 1967 – 14 September 1971

Never Mind the Quality, Feel the Width is a British television sitcom first broadcast in 1967 as a single play in the Armchair Theatre anthology series, later becoming a series of half-hour episodes, which ran until 1971. A total of 40 episodes were made; along with a mini episode that was featured in ITV's All Star Comedy Carnival in 1969.

It was originally made by ABC Weekend TV for the ITV network, with its production being continued by Thames Television from the 1968 Christmas special onwards.

== Plot ==
The plot revolves around two tailors in business together. Manny Cohen, played by John Bluthal, is Jewish, and Patrick Kelly, played by Joe Lynch, is Irish Catholic. Above their shop works Lewtas (Bernard Spear), who is also Jewish and imports cloth. Two further prominent characters in the first three series are Rabbi Levy (Christopher Benjamin in the pilot, thereafter Cyril Shaps) from the local synagogue, and Father Ryan (Denis Carey in the pilot, thereafter Eamon Kelly) from the local Catholic church.

One episode features Manny and Patrick trading the rights to display their pictures around the shop. Patrick has two pictures of the Pope on the wall, while Manny has one of Moshe Dayan. Manny's comment is "It's the going rate. Two Popes to one Moshe." Another episode, "The Not So Kosher Cantor", has Patrick, a talented singer, filling in at the synagogue for a sick cantor, on the occasion of a visit by the Chief Rabbi. Coached to sing phonetically in Hebrew, Patrick performs, every moment milked for comedic value. Finally, the Chief Rabbi congratulates Patrick but reveals he knows something is up. When asked how he knows, he replies that at the end of the service, "you genuflected and made the sign of the cross!"

== Cast ==
- John Bluthal as Manny Cohen
- Joe Lynch as Patrick Kelly
- Bernard Spear as Lewtas (16 episodes; series 3 to 6)
- Cyril Shaps as Rabbi Levy (9 episodes; series 1 to 3)
- Eamon Kelly as Father Ryan (7 episodes; series 1 to 3)
- Jim Norton as Father Ignatious (2 episodes; series 5 and 6)
- Meier Tzelniker as Israel Bloom (2 episodes; series 3 and 5)
- Rose Power as Mrs Critchley (2 episodes; series 3 and 5)

Notable guest artists include film actors Dennis Price as a Savile Row tailor and Rupert Davies as a Roman Catholic bishop, Fred Emney, Harold Bennett, David Kossoff (playing himself), Jack Smethurst, Frank Williams, Bill Pertwee, comedian Dick Bentley, Roy Marsden, Victor Maddern, Barbara Knox (credited as Barbara Mullaney), Roy Barraclough, George A. Cooper, Rita Webb, Michael Robbins, and Ellen Pollock as Manny's mother Ruby.

== Film adaptation ==
In 1973, Bluthal and Lynch reprised their roles in a film spin-off.

== DVD release ==
A 4-disc set of the show, containing the Thames TV series, was released on DVD on 28 June 2010, by Network. An episode from the ABC era (Man Shall Not Live By Bread Alone) was featured in a boxset titled ABC Nights In, which was also released by Network on 22 December 2020.

== Episodes ==
The pilot and the first two series were produced by ABC; however, the second series (of six episodes) did not air until just after Thames Television launched on 30 July 1968, which initially aired the six episodes from that series over August and September that year. Of the 40 episodes made, 11 are believed to no longer exist. These are the pilot, five of the six episodes from Series 1, and five of the six episodes from Series 2.

=== Pilot (1967) ===
No. overall	No. in series	Title	Archival Status	Original release date
1	1	"Never Mind the Quality, Feel the Width"	Missing	18 February 1967

=== Series 1 (1967) ===
No. overall	No. in series	Title	Archival Status	Original release date
2	1	"Cohen & Kelly"	Missing	25 November 1967
3	2	"Not So Much A Sanctuary, More A Penance"	Missing	2 December 1967
4	3	"Remember That Thou Keep Holy"	Missing	9 December 1967
5	4	"Man Shall Not Live By Bread Alone"	Exists	16 December 1967
6	5	"Leopards Can Change Their Spots"	Missing	23 December 1967
7	6	"A Flower of Israel"	Missing	30 December 1967

=== Series 2 (1968) ===
No. overall	No. in series	Title	Archival Status	Original release date
8	1	"And a Yamulka to Match"	Missing	13 August 1968
9	2	"A Madonna For Manny"	Missing	20 August 1968
10	3	"And Leave the Rest of the World Behind"	Missing	3 September 1968
11	4	"A Suit Fit for a Prince"	Missing	10 September 1968
12	5	"Hello Mother, Hello Father"	Exists	17 September 1968
13	6	"All That Glitters is Not Gelt"	Exists	24 September 1968

=== Christmas special (1968) ===
No. overall	No. in series	Title	Archival Status	Original release date
14	1	"I'm Dreaming of a Kosher Christmas"	Exists	26 December 1968

=== Series 3 (1969) ===
No. overall	No. in series	Title	Archival Status	Original release date
15	1	"Old Soldiers Never Die"	Exists	21 August 1969
16	2	"Situations Vacant"	Exists	28 August 1969
17	3	"David Kossoff? He's a Friend of Mine"	Exists	4 September 1969
18	4	"Arrividerci Roma"	Exists	11 September 1969
19	5	"It's the Thourght that Counts"	Exists	18 September 1969
20	6	"And a Brother a Priest"	Exists	25 September 1969

=== Christmas special (1969) ===
No. overall	No. in series	Title	Archival Status	Original release date
21	1	""All Star Comedy Carnival" (mini episode)"	Missing	25 December 1969

=== Series 4 (1970) ===
No. overall	No. in series	Title	Archival Status	Original release date
22	1	"Blood is Thinner than Water"	Exists	25 June 1970
23	2	"Without Prejudice"	Exists	2 July 1970
24	3	"New Worlds for Old"	Exists	9 July 1970
25	4	"What You've Never Had, You Never Miss"	Exists	16 July 1970
26	5	"Miracles to Measure"	Exists	23 July 1970
27	6	"Only Four Can Play"	Exists	30 July 1970

=== Series 5 (1970–71) ===
No. overall	No. in series	Title	Archival Status	Original release date
28	1	"And Ecumenicals to You"	Exists	15 December 1970
29	2	"I'll Take You Home Again, Kathleen"	Exists	22 December 1970
30	3	"Twenty Years On"	Exists	29 December 1970
31	4	"A Question of Policy"	Exists	5 January 1971
32	5	"The Not So Kosher Cantor"	Exists	12 January 1971
33	6	"And Nobody Knew They Were There"	Exists	19 January 1971
34	7	"You Will Go To The Ball, Manny Cohen"	Exists	26 January 1971

Episodes 1, 3, 4 and 7 of series 5 were made in black-and-white due to the ITV Colour Strike.

=== Series 6 (1971) ===
No. overall	No. in series	Title	Archival Status	Original release date
35	1	"Manny Cohen R.I.P."	Exists	3 August 1971
36	2	"Romeo Cohen and Juliet Weinberg"	Exists	10 August 1971
37	3	"Holiday with Kosher Strings"	Exists	17 August 1971
38	4	"There's No Smoke Without Fire"	Exists	24 August 1971
39	5	"Weavers to Wearers"	Exists	31 August 1971
40	6	"Daylight Robbery"	Exists	7 September 1971
41	7	"Mix Me a Marriage"	Exists	14 September 1971

== See also ==
- List of films based on British sitcoms
- The Rag Trade
