= Hylda Baker =

English comedian and actress (1905–1986)

- Baker in 1966
- Born: Hilda Baker; 4 February 1905; Farnworth, Lancashire, England
- Died: 1 May 1986 (aged 81); Epsom, Surrey, England
- Occupations: Music hall performer, comedienne, actress
- Years active: 1914–1978
- Spouse: Ben Pearson (m. 1929; div. 1933)

Hylda Baker (4 February 1905 – 1 May 1986) was an English comedian, actress and music hall performer. Born and brought up in Farnworth, Lancashire, she is perhaps best remembered for her role as Nellie Pledge in the Granada ITV sitcom Nearest and Dearest (1968–1973) and for her role in the 1960 film Saturday Night and Sunday Morning.

== Early life and career ==
Baker was born in Farnworth, Lancashire, the first of seven children. Her father, Harold Baker, was a painter and signwriter, who also worked part-time in the music halls as a comedian. At ten, Baker made her debut at the Opera House, Tunbridge Wells, and continued to tour as a single variety act — singing, dancing and performing impersonations. By the age of fourteen, she had started writing, producing and performing her own shows. Her stage act included a gossip from the North of England, with a silent, sullen companion named "Big Cynthia", almost always played by a man in drag (such as Victor Graham, and lastly by Matthew Kelly). Her act was full of malapropisms and catchphrases that had become part of her public persona, the most familiar being "She knows, y'know!" and, when asked the time "It's quarter past ... I must get a little hand put on this watch."

== Film and television career ==
Baker came to national attention in BBC television's The Good Old Days in 1955. This led to her television series, Be Soon (named after another of her catchphrases), in 1957 and a supporting part in the sitcom Our House in 1960, followed by her own sitcom, The Best of Friends, in 1963.

She also appeared in films, including Karel Reisz's Saturday Night and Sunday Morning (1960), Up the Junction (1968), and playing Mrs. Sowerberry in the musical Oliver! (1968) based on the Lionel Bart stage original. Reisz had seen Baker performing her sketches at the Chiswick Empire theatre before casting her in Saturday Night and Sunday Morning. She had a starring role in the low-budget black-and-white British comedy film She Knows Y'Know (1962). Taking its title from her catch-phrase, it is described by the BFI as a "low life comedy, unfolded against an industrial town backdrop".

Baker's highest profile role was as Nellie Pledge in the Granada Television comedy series Nearest and Dearest (1968–73). Playing her brother Eli was the comedian Jimmy Jewel and the series was centred on their characters' love-hate relationship as they tried to run their small family business, Pledge's Purer Pickles. As they bickered onscreen and traded insults such as "knocked-kneed knackered old nosebag" and "big girl's blouse", the insults continued off-screen as the two performers disliked each other intensely. A film version of the series was made by Hammer Films in 1972 (the same year she was a subject of This Is Your Life when she was surprised by Eamonn Andrews). Later in the series, Baker began having trouble remembering her lines and had to rely on cue cards and prompts from her co star Madge Hindle, who would whisper her next line to her.

Baker played a virtually identical role in the LWT comedy series Not On Your Nellie (1974–75). In this series she played Nellie Pickersgill, who moves to London from the North to run her ailing father's pub. However the series was short-lived and, along with her difficulty in remembering her lines, she was also refusing to attend rehearsals. After suing the production company for an on-set injury in which she broke her leg (after slipping on beer on the set), the series ended, as did her television acting career.

Baker recreated her variety act in an episode of the BBC series The Good Old Days in 1976.

In a coda to her musical career, she teamed with Arthur Mullard in 1978 to record a comedy version of "You're the One That I Want" from the film Grease. Baker and Mullard, then aged 73 and 68, dressed in wigs and costumes similar to the John Travolta and Olivia Newton-John characters from Grease and appeared on the BBC show Top of the Pops and the Granada Television music show for children Get It Together. Their version reached #22 in the UK’s BBC singles chart. The two entertainers recorded an album of pop covers entitled Band on the Trot.

Her final television appearance came the same year in an episode of the BBC arts documentary show Omnibus about comedians, broadcast on 28 December 1978.

== Personal life and death ==
Baker was married to Ben Pearson from 1929 until 1933, when the couple divorced. Baker suffered two ectopic pregnancies in her twenties, which led in part to the breakdown of her marriage.

On Christmas Eve 1961, Baker was hit by a passing car that mounted the pavement in London's Charing Cross Road, not far from her home at Ridgmount Gardens in Bloomsbury. Left with a broken toe and bruising, Baker claimed she was unable to work for 34 weeks and that the accident had left her with "a waddle". She sued the driver of the vehicle for damages and loss of earnings. Baker refused a settlement offer of £4,000 and took the matter to the High Court where she was initially awarded £2,921 in 1964, but this was increased to £4,073 (plus costs) at an appeal hearing in 1965.

In 1971, Baker's chauffeur Noel Moncaster absconded with £2,500 of her cash. Moncaster was arrested three months later, by which time only £45 of the money remained, after he had used it to travel to France, Spain and Africa. At his trial, Blackpool Magistrates ordered Moncaster to pay Baker £400 (the maximum the magistrates could award) and committed him for later sentencing by Blackpool's quarter session court.

Baker lived the life of a star, dressing in furs and keeping monkeys as pets. She annoyed her neighbours with loud parties at her Blackpool home. Baker showed the earliest signs of cognitive decline in 1972, when she was 67, when she had difficulty remembering her lines in the last two series of Nearest and Dearest, and by the last series she had to increasingly rely on cue cards and prompts from co star Madge Hindle in order to deliver her lines. In 1974–75, while working on Not On Your Nellie, Baker's cognitive decline deepened, which necessitated her to have a stronger reliance on cue cards, and she often failed to show up for rehearsals. Baker's time on the series ended in deep controversy, with her slipping and breaking her leg on set, and her then suing the production company LWT, which saw an abrupt end to both Not On Your Nellie and to her performing career in general. Baker did, however, make one final on-screen performance in 1976 in an episode of The Good Old Days, and she made her final TV appearances in 1978.

Baker was diagnosed with Alzheimer's disease in her early seventies, and at age 76 in 1981 she moved to Brinsworth House, the retirement home for performers, in Twickenham, London. In 1984, she was moved to a psychiatric hospital in Epsom, Surrey, where she died two years later in 1986, aged 81, from bronchial pneumonia.

== Legacy ==
Actress Jean Fergusson, known for her role in Last of the Summer Wine, wrote a biography and devised and starred in a tribute show, She Knows Y' Know!, at London's Vaudeville Theatre in 1997. The show was nominated for the Laurence Olivier Award for Best Entertainment in 1998.

Fellow comedian Victoria Wood described Baker's comedic talent as "peculiarly Northern".

Alison Steadman played Baker in the play Our Hylda by Martyn Hesford, first broadcast on BBC Radio 4 on 15 June 2017.

== Filmography ==
Year	Title	Role	Notes
1960	Saturday Night and Sunday Morning	Aunt Ada	
1962	She Knows Y'Know	Hylda Worswick	
1968	Up the Junction	Winnie	
1968	Oliver!	Mrs. Sowerberry	
1972	Nearest and Dearest	Nellie Pledge	

== Archives ==
- The papers of Hylda Baker relating to her life and career are housed in Lancashire Archives, reference DDX 1683.
