= Joe Lynch (actor) =

Irish actor (1926–2001)

- Lynch in Never Mind the Quality, Feel the Width
- Born: Joseph Laurence Lynch; 16 July 1926; Mallow, County Cork, Ireland
- Died: 1 August 2001 (aged 75); Alicante, Spain
- Occupations: Actor, singer, songwriter
- Years active: 1959–2000
- Spouse: Marie Nutty

Joseph Laurence Lynch (16 July 1926 – 1 August 2001) was an Irish actor who had a long career in both comedy and drama. He provided voice work for children's animated series, in particular Chorlton and the Wheelies. He was latterly best known in Ireland for playing wily farmer Dinny Byrne in Glenroe on RTÉ television from 1983 to 2000.

Lynch was also a singer and songwriter, performing in the film Johnny Nobody (1961). He also recorded work by other songwriters, including Leo Maguire's "The Whistling Gypsy" and Dick Farrelly's "Cottage by the Lee", one of his biggest 1950s recordings.

== Early life ==
Born in Mallow in County Cork, Lynch attended the North Monastery Christian Brothers School. He had a number of other jobs before moving into acting and broadcasting full time.

== Career ==
Initially acting part-time with the Cork Shakespearean Company and at the Cork Opera House, by 1947 Lynch was acting full-time.

He was a founding member of the Radio Éireann Players and appeared in productions of Teresa Deevy plays among others. Between 1967–81, he acted onstage with the Abbey Theatre. During the 1950s he was responsible for a Radio Éireann show Living with Lynch, broadcast on Sunday nights — the first comedy series on Radio Éireann.

Lynch appeared in the popular ABC/Thames Television sitcom Never Mind the Quality, Feel the Width (1968–70), and its spin-off feature film in 1973. Other notable film roles included The Siege of Sidney Street (1960), The Running Man (1963), Girl with Green Eyes (1964), The Face of Fu Manchu (1965), Ulysses (1967), Loot (1970), The Mackintosh Man (1973), The Outsider (1980), If You Go Down in the Woods Today (1981) and Eat the Peach (1986). In the 1970s, Lynch made regular guest appearances as Elsie Tanner's boyfriend in the long-running Granada TV soap Coronation Street.

In 1962, and again in 1977, Lynch won a Jacob's Award for his acting on RTÉ television.

By 1979, Lynch was back in Ireland, and made his first appearances as Dinny Byrne in the RTÉ soap Bracken. Later the Byrne character would feature in the long-running RTÉ soap Glenroe.

Lynch quit Glenroe after he claimed to have been "shamefully treated" and offered "small potatoes" when he asked for a pay rise. He was also upset that he was not to get a pension. RTÉ disputed those claims. Lynch criticised RTÉ for preventing him from doing other acting work alongside Glenroe. "I was terrible restricted in RTÉ, they wouldn't let me off for anything, even commercials."

Lynch voiced the main antagonist, "Grundel the Toad", in the Don Bluth film Thumbelina, his final audio work before his death seven years later.

== Filmography ==
=== Film ===
Year	Title	Role	Director	Notes
1960	The Night Fighters	Seamus	Tay Garnett	
1960	The Siege of Sidney Street	Sgt. Todd	Robert S. Baker; Monty Berman	
1961	Johnny Nobody	Tinker	Nigel Patrick	
1963	The List of Adrian Messenger	Cyclist	John Huston	Uncredited
1963	The Running Man	Roy Tanner	Carol Reed	
1964	Girl with Green Eyes	Andy Devlin	Desmond Davis	
1965	Young Cassidy	1st Hurler	Jack Cardiff; John Ford	
1965	The Face of Fu Manchu	Custodian	Don Sharp	
1967	Ulysses	Blazes Boylan	Joseph Strick	
1967	Robbery	Lorry driver	Peter Yates	Uncredited
1969	The Best House in London	Policeman	Philip Saville	Uncredited
1970	Loot	Father O'Shaughnessy	Silvio Narizzano	
1973	Never Mind the Quality, Feel the Width	Patrick Brendan Kevin Aloysius Kelly	Ronnie Baxter	
1973	The MacKintosh Man	1st Garda	John Huston	
1976	Never Too Young to Rock	Russian Soldier	Dennis Abey	
1979	The Saint and the Brave Goose	Capt. Finnigan	Cyril Frankel	
1979	The Outsider	Sean Thompson	Tony Luraschi	
1981	If You Go Down in the Woods Today	Shepherd	Eric Sykes	
1986	Eat the Peach	Boss Murtagh	Peter Ormrod	
1994	Thumbelina	Grundel	Don Bluth; Gary Goldman	Voice

=== Television ===
Year	Title	Role	Notes
1958	Theatre Night	Christopher Mahon	Episode: "The Heart's a Wonder"
1959	The Anne Shelton Show		4 episodes
1964	No Hiding Place	Paddy	Episode: "An Eye for an Eye"
1964	Compact	Hennegan	4 episodes
1965	Thirty-Minute Theatre	Kieron	Episode: "The Late Arrival of the Incoming Aircraft"
1966	Redcap	Sgt. O'Brien	Episode: "Crime Passionel"
1966	Insurrection	Cathal Brugha	Episode: "Thursday, 27 April 1916: When We Are All Wiped Out"
1966	Armchair Theatre	Des Humphries	Episode: "Great Big Blonde"
1967	Ó Dúill	Liam Ó Dúill	TV Mini-Series
1967	Sanctuary	Mr. Daly	Episode: "You Can't Touch Me"
1967	The Gamblers	Mullery	Episode: "Read 'em and Weep"
1967-1971	Never Mind the Quality, Feel the Width	Patrick Kelly	41 episodes
1968	Thirty-Minute Theatre	Mr. Hill	Episode: "Eveline"
1968	The Jazz Age	Fetch	Episode: "The Assassin"
1969	Love Story		Episode: "Look Out! It's Margaret Mitchell's Solicitors!"
1969	All Star Comedy Carnival	Patrick Brendan Kevin Aloysius Kelly	TV movie
1970	Happy Ever After	Wiggy	Episode: "Come Back Stranger"
1970	ITV Sunday Night Theatre	Michael O'Connor	Episode: "Slattery's Mounted Foot"
1972	ITV Sunday Night Drama	Finbar O'Sullivan	Episode: "The Sanctuary Man"
1973	Crown Court	George Wills	Episode: "The Night for Country Dancing"
1973	The View from Daniel Pike	Jim Murphy	Episode: "None So Blind"
1973	The Frighteners	Bob Blaw	Episode: "Glad to Be of Help"
1974	Childhood	Michael O'Donovan	Episode: "An Only Child"
1974	The Tommy Cooper Hour		1 episodes
1974	The Playboy of the Western World	Michael James	TV movie
1975	Crown Court	Eric Flynn	Episode: "Ring in the New Year"
1975	Rule Britannia!	Paddy O'Brien	7 episodes
1976-1979	Chorlton and the Wheelies	Narrator / Various Characters	17 episodes
1976	Breakdown	Dick Culver	TV movie
1976	Whodunnit?	Art Selby	Episode: "A Bad Habit"
1978-1980	Coronation Street	Ron Mather	41 episodes
1979	Play for Today	Stacey	Episode: "The Out of Town Boys"
1979	Return of the Saint	Captain Finnigan	2 episodes
1979	The Hard Way	Devane	TV movie
1980-1982	Bracken	Dinny Byrne	11 episodes
1983	The Irish R.M.	Sgt. Murray	4 episodes
1983-2000	Glenroe	Dinny Byrne	regular
