= For the Love of Ada =

British TV sitcom (1970–1971)

- Created by: Vince Powell & Harry Driver
- Starring: Irene Handl; Wilfred Pickles; Barbara Mitchell; Jack Smethurst
- Country of origin: United Kingdom
- Original language: English
- No. of series: 4
- No. of episodes: 27

Production
- Producer: Thames Television
- Running time: 25 minutes per episode (30 mins with adverts)

Original release
- Network: ITV
- Release: 20 April 1970 – 26 December 1971

For the Love of Ada is an ITV sitcom that ran for 27 episodes across four series between April 1970 and December 1971. It centres on a gentle romance between two pensioners, a theme uncommon in British sitcoms of the time.

Created by Vince Powell and Harry Driver, the sitcom starred Irene Handl as the widowed Ada Cresswell and Wilfred Pickles as Walter Bingley, a gentle, working-class cemetery gravedigger with whom she gradually falls in love. Ada shares a home with her sharp-tongued daughter Ruth Pollitt (Barbara Mitchell) and her well-meaning but often flustered son-in-law Leslie (Jack Smethurst). Much of the humour in the early episodes derives from Ruth’s disapproval and Leslie’s awkwardness as they attempt to adjust to Ada’s blossoming late-life romance. The series gently explores themes of companionship, ageing, and the generational divide, while maintaining a light, character-driven style.

The series, produced by Ronnie Baxter for Thames Television, was filmed in colour using a multi-camera studio setup, with episodes running 25 to 30 minutes. It notably dispensed with traditional title sequences, opting instead for opening credits superimposed over live scenes.

== Outline ==
For the Love of Ada stars Irene Handl as Ada Cresswell, a Cockney pensioner widow fond of malapropisms. She lives with her daughter Ruth Pollitt (Barbara Mitchell) and son‑in‑law Leslie Pollitt (Jack Smethurst). Ada begins a warm friendship with Walter Bingley (Wilfred Pickles), the Yorkshire gravedigger who buried her husband, after meeting him while tending her husband’s grave in the cemetery. Their companionship evolves into romance over time, culminating in an engagement, which leads to their marriage and cohabitation in Walter’s lodge at the cemetery.

Ada’s tendency towards malapropisms provides gentle humour, while the North–South contrast between Ada and Walter adds depth to their characters and their relationship. Over four series and a sketch-length Christmas Special, viewers see the couple court, become engaged, marry, and settle into their life together at Cemetery Lodge.

== Cast ==
=== Main ===
- Irene Handl as Ada Cresswell (later Bingley)
- Wilfred Pickles as Walter Bingley
- Barbara Mitchell as Ruth Pollitt (née Cresswell)
- Jack Smethurst as Leslie Pollitt

=== Recurring ===
- Robert Keegan as Jack Pollitt, Leslie's father
- Mollie Sugden as Nellie Pollitt, Leslie's mother
- Malcolm Rogers as the Vicar
- Cecily Hullett as Freda Skinner
- Gabrielle Daye as Mrs Armitage
- Charles Lamb as Arthur Parsons
- Anna Turner as Maggie Bingley
- Freddie Jones as David Llewellin Griffiths
- Patsy Rowlands as Pauline Whitehead
- Meadows White as Fred Carter
- Bert Palmer as Fred Bingley
- Ann Way as Florrie Bingley
- Ann Beach as Alice Bingley
- Colin Welland (Series 2) Gerard Hely as Albert Bingley
- Daphne Heard as the nosey neighbour

== Transmission dates ==
Series 1
(6 x 25 mins) 20 April-25 May 1970 – Mondays mostly 9.30pm

Series 2
(7 x 25 mins) 14 September-26 October 1970 – Mondays 9.30pm

Short Special
Part of the All-Star Comedy Carnival 25 December 1970 – Friday 6pm

Series 3
(7 x 25 mins) 15 March-3 May 1971 – Mondays 8.30pm

Series 4
(6 x 25 mins) 26 August-30 September 1971 – Thursdays 9pm

Christmas Special
(38 mins) Boxing Day (27 December 1971) – Sundays 6.45pm

== Series overview ==
Series	Episodes	Originally released	
Series	Episodes	First released	Last released
1	6	20 April 1970	25 May 1970
2	7	14 September 1970	26 October 1970
3	7	15 March 1971	26 April 1971
4	6	26 August 1971	30 September 1971
Special	1	27 December 1971	

The complete series, which had not been seen on British television for over 20 years, first reappeared on UK Gold in 1993, and again in 1997. It later aired on Talking Pictures TV in late 2018, with further repeats in 2020, 2021 and 2023, with some offensive words muted.

== Episodes ==
DVD titles in brackets.

=== Series 1 (1970) ===
No. overall	No. in series	Title	Original release date
1	1	"The Widower" "(Walter Meets Ada)"	20 April 1970
2	2	"Sunday Tea" "(Walter Comes to Tea)"	27 April 1970
3	3	"The Permissive Society" "(Walter & Ada Go on a Weekend)"	4 May 1970
4	4	"The Football Match" "(Leslie Gets Tickets for the Cup)"	11 May 1970
5	5	"Another Man" "(Ada Tries to Make Walter Jealous)"	18 May 1970
6	6	"Spring" "(Walter Proposes to Ada)"	25 May 1970

=== Series 2 (1970) ===
No. overall	No. in series	Title	Original release date
7	1	"Wedding Plans" "(Episode One)"	14 September 1970
8	2	"Divorce?" "(Episode Two)"	21 September 1970
9	3	"Sent to Coventry" "(Episode Three)"	28 September 1970
10	4	"The Birthday" "(Episode Four)"	5 October 1970
11	5	"The Grave" "(Episode Five)"	12 October 1970
12	6	"The Elopement" "(Episode Six)"	19 October 1970
13	7	"The Wedding" "(Episode Seven)"	26 October 1970

=== Series 3 (1971) ===
No. overall	No. in series	Title	Original release date
14	1	"After the Honeymoon" "(The Honeymooners Return)"	15 March 1971
15	2	"The Parents" "(A Sentimental Journey)"	22 March 1971
16	3	"Housekeeping" "(Ada Holds the Purse Strings)"	29 March 1971
17	4	"The Eviction" "(The Eviction Order)"	5 April 1971
18	5	"A Lunchtime Drink" "(The Sunday Lunchtime Drink)"	12 April 1971
19	6	"The Royalist" "(The Queen's Birthday)"	19 April 1971
20	7	"The Mortgage" "(Should Ada and Walter Move?)"	26 April 1971

=== Series 4 (1971) ===
No. overall	No. in series	Title	Original release date
21	1	"The Baby" "(Ada and Walter are Haunted)"	26 August 1971
22	2	"Bowling" "(Walter Makes a Bet)"	2 September 1971
23	3	"Birth" "(The Arrival of the Grandchild)"	9 September 1971
24	4	"The Admirer" "(Ada Has An Admirer)"	16 September 1971
25	5	"Insominia" "(A Baby in the House)"	23 September 1971
26	6	"The Christening"	30 September 1971

=== Christmas Special (1971) ===
No. overall	No. in series	Title	Original release date
27	1	"Christmas with Ada"	27 December 1971

== Film version ==
In 1972, a feature-length film adaptation was released, again starring Handl and Pickles, and directed by Ronnie Baxter. The plot revolves around the couple's first wedding anniversary and the chaos of a surprise party thrown by their family. The film received a lukewarm reception; one critic in the Monthly Film Bulletin described it as “a boneless jelly of a film… thoroughly patronising”.

== American version ==
For the Love of Ada spawned an American remake called A Touch of Grace that premiered on ABC in January 1973. This version starred Shirley Booth and J. Pat O'Malley as Grace Simpson and Herbert Morrison, who like their English counterparts fall in love. The American version faced very tough competition from All In The Family and drew low ratings, resulting in its cancellation in April 1973 after 13 episodes, but ABC ran reruns of the show in prime time until June 1973.

=== See also ===
- List of films based on British television series

== DVD release ==
All four series of For the Love of Ada were released between 2009 and 2012.

DVD	Release date
The Complete Series 1	12 October 2009
The Complete Series 2	4 July 2011
The Complete Series 3	17 October 2011
The Complete Series 4	16 January 2012
The Complete Series 1 to 4 Box Set	19 March 2018
