= Jimmy Jewel =

British comedian (1909–1995)

- Born: James Arthur Thomas Jewel Marsh; 4 December 1909; Sheffield, West Riding of Yorkshire, England
- Died: 3 December 1995 (aged 85); London, England
- Other name: Maurice Marsh
- Occupations: Comedy actor Music hall artist
- Spouse: Belle Bluett (m. 1939; died 1985)
- Children: 2

James Arthur Thomas Jewel Marsh (4 December 1909 – 3 December 1995), known professionally as Jimmy Jewel, was an English comedian and actor whose long career in stage, radio, television and film productions, included a 32-year partnership with his cousin Ben Warriss.

== Career ==
The son of a comedian and actor who also used the stage name Jimmy Jewel, the younger performer made his stage debut, aged four, in Robinson Crusoe in Barnsley, then worked with his father from the age of ten. He subsequently became stage manager for the family's touring music hall show.

When young, Jimmy started his own act. His father initially refused to let him use the stage name Jimmy Jewel, so he performed as Maurice Marsh; the name was chosen because he was often seen doing Maurice Chevalier impressions. He made his first London stage appearance at the Bedford Music Hall, Camden Town in 1925.

=== Jewel and Warriss ===
Jewel and Ben Warriss were first cousins and were brought up in the same household, even being born in the same bed (a few months apart). Jewel worked as a solo act until 1934, before forming a double act with Warriss, initially at the Palace Theatre, Newcastle. They toured Australia and America, as well as appearing in the 1946 Royal Variety Performance and five pantomimes for Howard & Wyndham Ltd at the Opera House, Blackpool, Lancashire.

The pair had a major success with the BBC radio series Up the Pole, which began in October 1947 and cast them as proprietors of an Arctic trading post. Each episode included a musical interlude, sometimes provided by Julie Andrews, then a child performer. Only one episode is known to survive in the BBC Archives.

The two men were also top of the bill in two London Palladium shows, Gangway (1942) and High Time (1946) and made regular television appearances in the 1950s and 1960s. The duo had the lead roles in the short-lived 1962 comedy series It's a Living.

=== Post-1966 ===
After splitting from Warriss in 1966, and having done a stint working as a joiner and bricklayer, Jewel appeared in a Comedy Playhouse and two ITV Playhouse productions. He also played a murderous quick-change vaudeville artist in a 1968 episode of The Avengers. He then starred in the sitcom Nearest and Dearest with Hylda Baker, playing bickering brother-and-sister pickle factory owners Eli and Nellie Pledge. The show ran from 1968 to 1973, with a stage version appearing in 1970 and a film in 1972. As their characters hurled insults at each other on screen, the insults would continue off screen as well, as the two performers disliked each other intensely.

While Nearest and Dearest was running, Jewel had a regular role in the short-lived 1969 sitcom Thicker Than Water, and made an appearance in the 1970 film The Man Who Had Power Over Women. He then starred in the comedy series Spring & Autumn (1972–76) as retired railway worker Tommy Butler. He also developed a distinguished stage career, initially by playing the jaded tutor, Eddie Waters, in the controversial Trevor Griffiths play Comedians (1975–77). In addition, he starred in The Sunshine Boys (West End 1975; Bromley 1981), as Willy Loman in Death of a Salesman (Nottingham 1977), Alfred Doolittle in Pygmalion (Bromley 1980), and in You Can't Take It with You at the Royal National Theatre (1983).

In the early 1980s, Jewel made appearances in the children's series Worzel Gummidge (1980) and two episodes of Play For Today. He then starred in Funny Man, a 1981 series about a family music hall act, based by writer Adele Rose on that of Jewel's own father. In 1984, he played the part of a devoted greenkeeper in the Channel 4 comedy drama Arthur's Hallowed Ground (1984). In 1986, he had a regular role in the BBC crime drama Hideaway.

In the 1990s, then in his eighties, Jewel continued to make appearances in film and television. He appeared as Cannonball Lee, the boxing-loving grandfather of the Kray twins in the 1990 film The Krays, and as fellow Sheffielder Michael Palin's father in American Friends (1991). On television, he appeared in the 1990 ITV play Missing Persons (which was the pilot for the later BBC series Hetty Wainthropp Investigates), and also appeared in episodes of One Foot in the Grave (1990) and Casualty (1991). His final screen appearance was in a 1993 episode of Lovejoy.

== Personal life and death ==
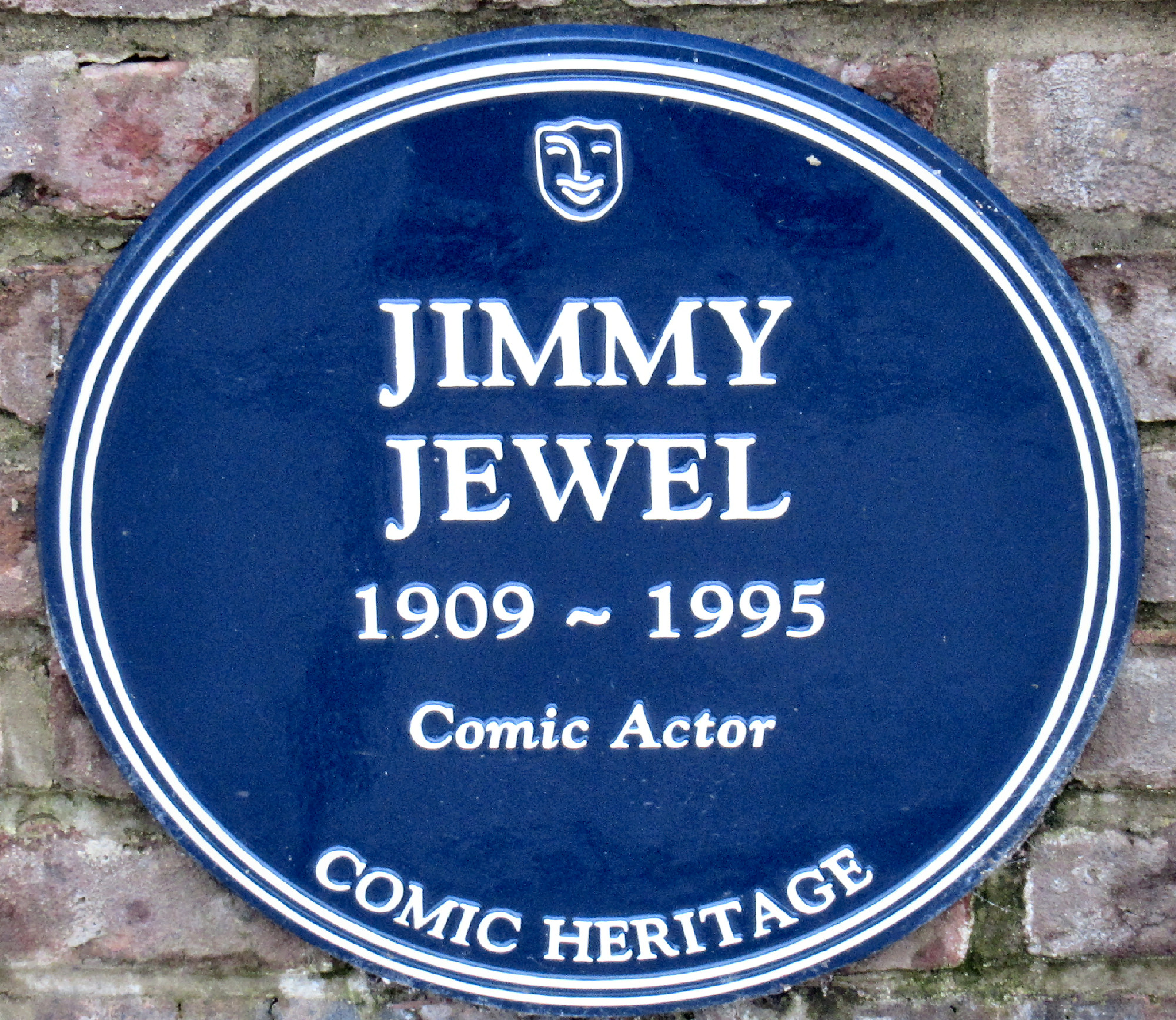
Comic Heritage plaque, Teddington

Jewel was married to Belle Bluett, with whom he had a son and an adopted daughter. In 1985, he won a Variety Club of Great Britain Special Award. Jewel died on 3 December 1995, the day before his 86th birthday.

== Filmography ==
Year	Title	Role	Notes
1943	Rhythm Serenade	Jimmy Martin	
1949	What a Carry On!	Jimmy B. Jervis	
1950	Let's Have a Murder	Jimmy Jewsbury	
1970	The Man Who Had Power Over Women	Mr. Pringle	
1972	Nearest and Dearest	Eli Pledge	
1984	Arthur's Hallowed Ground	Arthur	
1986	Rocinante	Projectionist	
1990	The Krays	Cannonball Lee	
1991	American Friends	Ashby Senior	
