= All Star Comedy Carnival =

British TV comedy series (1969–1973)

All Star Comedy Carnival is an annual Christmas-special produced by ITV, containing new mini-episodes of British sitcoms and light entertainment programmes, along with some musical interludes. This was broadcast annually on 25 December on ITV, from 1969 to 1973. It was hosted by Des O'Connor in 1969, Max Bygraves in 1970, Mike and Bernie Winters in 1971 and Jimmy Tarbuck in 1972 and 1973, All Star Comedy Carnival was a direct competitor to the BBC's Christmas Night with the Stars. All had short five-minute sketches devised and produced for transmission within the festive period, written by the original writers of each comedy series.

== Sitcoms featured ==
1969: Presented by Des O'Connor

- Doctor in the House
- Mr Digby Darling
- Cribbins
- Please Sir!
- Never Mind the Quality, Feel the Width
- Jokers Wild
- On the Buses
- Father Dear Father
- Two in Clover
- The Dustbinmen
- Coronation Street
- Dear Mother...Love Albert
- Mike Yarwood

1970: Presented by Max Bygraves. This edition was recorded and transmitted in black-and-white due to the ITV Colour Strike.

- Girls About Town
- The Worker
- The Des O'Connor Show
- Coronation Street
- The Lovers
- Hark at Barker
- Doctor in the House
- Jokers Wild
- Dear Mother...Love Albert
- Albert and Victoria
- For the Love of Ada
- Cribbins
- Father Dear Father

1971: Presented by Mike and Bernie Winters

- Doctor at Large
- The Lovers
- And Mother Makes Three
- His and Hers
- Please Sir!
- The Fenn Street Gang
- Girls About Town
- Dear Mother...Love Albert
- Sez Les
- Lollipop Loves Mr. Mole
- Father Dear Father

1972: Presented by Jimmy Tarbuck

- Love Thy Neighbour
- On The Buses
- Christmas With Wogan
- Nearest and Dearest
- Thirty Minutes Worth
- Sez Les
- The Fenn Street Gang
- Father Dear Father

1973: Presented by Jimmy Tarbuck

- Man About The House
- Billy Liar
- My Good Woman
- Spring and Autumn
- Doctor in Charge
