= Harry Driver =

British television scriptwriter (1931–1973)

- Born: 13 May 1931; Blackley, Manchester, England, United Kingdom
- Died: 25 November 1973 (aged 42); Weybridge, Surrey, England, United Kingdom
- Occupations: Scriptwriter, executive producer
- Writing career
- Period: 1960–1973
- Genre: Television

Harry Driver (13 May 1931 – 25 November 1973) was a British television scriptwriter and executive producer. He is best remembered for his partnership with Vince Powell on comedy television programmes including Never Mind the Quality, Feel the Width, Nearest and Dearest, Bless This House and Love Thy Neighbour.

== Biography ==
Driver formed an amateur comedy act with Vince Powell known as Hammond and Powell, which performed in the Northern club circuit by night, whilst working as a trainee manager with Marks and Spencer department stores by day. Driver developed polio in December 1955. According to the BFI Screenonline, he spent "the next 18 months in hospital (12 of them in an iron lung), and, unable to move his arms and legs, he spent the rest of his life in a wheelchair." Ironically it was this which spurred him into his successful writing career. Driver began to write stories and scripts, initially when in the iron lung (via dictation) and then on a typewriter, apparently with a knitting needle clenched between his teeth."

Driver began sending scripts to Granada Television, one of his submissions was eventually accepted. He received his first television credit for an episode of Skyport (1959–60), a drama set in an airport broadcast on 24 March 1960. His former performing partner, Vince Powell, meanwhile, had also turned his hand to writing and had begun to collaborate with Driver. Their first major success was Here's Harry, written with Frank Roscoe followed by a spell contributing material for comedian Harry Worth, before providing scripts and storylines for Coronation Street. and together the pair became one of Britain's greatest comedy teams of the 1960s, writing television sitcoms such as Nearest and Dearest, George and the Dragon and For the Love of Ada.

== Personal life ==
He was the subject of This Is Your Life in 1969 when he was surprised by Eamonn Andrews. He died aged 42 on 25 November 1973.

== Writing credits ==
Production	Notes	Broadcaster/Distributor
Skyport	"Episode Thirty-Nine" (1960)	ITV
Here's Harry	21 episodes (1960–1965)	BBC 1
Coronation Street	58 episodes (1961–1964, 1966–1971, 1973)	ITV
De Laatste Trein	Television film (co-written with Vince Powell and Frank Roscoe, 1962)	VARA
Bulldog Breed	"The New Digs" (1962); "The New Garage" (1962)	ITV
De Rally	Television film (co-written with Vince Powell and Frank Roscoe, 1962)	VARA
Bootsie and Snudge	"Being Nice to Bootsie" (co-written with Jack Rosenthal, 1963)	ITV
The Odd Man	"The Saga of Johnny Mac" (co-written with Jack Rosenthal, 1963)	ITV
Comedy Playhouse	"On the Knocker" (co-written with Jack Rosenthal, 1963); "A Picture of Innocence" (co-written with Jack Rosenthal, 1963); "The Chars" (co-written with Jack Rosenthal, 1963); "Spanner in the Works" (co-written with Vince Powell, 1967)	BBC One
The Villains	"Les Girls" (co-written with Vince Powell, 1964); "Big Fleas Have Little Fleas" (1964)	ITV
Taxi!	13 episodes (co-written with Jack Rosenthal, 1964)	BBC One
Pardon the Expression	16 episodes (co-written with Vince Powell, 1965–1966)	ITV
Adam Adamant Lives!	"Beauty Is an Ugly Word" (co-written with Vince Powell, 1966); "The Village of Evil" (co-written with Vince Powell, 1966); "Conspiracy of Death" (co-written with Vince Powell, 1967); "The Survivors" (co-written with Vince Powell, 1967); "The Deadly Bullet" (co-written with Vince Powell, 1967)	BBC 1
George and the Dragon	26 episodes (co-written with Vince Powell, 1966–1968)	ITV
That's Show Business	Television film (co-written with Vince Powell, 1967)	ITV
Armchair Theatre	"Never Mind the Quality, Feel the Width" (co-written with Vince Powell, 1967)	ITV
Never Mind the Quality, Feel the Width	29 episodes (co-written with Vince Powell, 1967–1971)	ABC Television/Thames Television; ITV
Best of Enemies	5 episodes (co-written with Vince Powell, 1968–1969)	ITV
Nearest and Dearest	13 episodes (co-written with Vince Powell, 1968–1973)	ITV
Two in Clover	13 episodes (co-written with Vince Powell, 1969–1970)	ITV
For the Love of Ada	27 episodes (co-written with Vince Powell, 1970–1971)	ITV
Bless This House	13 episodes (co-written with Vince Powell, 1971–1974)	ITV
Mike and Bernie	6 episodes (co-written with Vince Powell, 1971–1972)	ITV
Love Thy Neighbour	37 episodes (co-written with Vince Powell, 1972–1974)	ITV
Spring & Autumn	10 episodes (co-written with Vince Powell, 1972–1974)	ITV
All Star Comedy Carnival	"Love Thy Neighbour" (mini-episode, 1972); "Spring and Autumn" (mini-episode, 1973)	ITV
For the Love of Ada	Feature film (co-written with Vince Powell, 1972)	Tigon British Film Productions
Cheap at Half the Price	Television film (co-written with Vince Powell, 1972)	ITV
Never Mind the Quality, Feel the Width	Feature film (co-written with Vince Powell, 1973)	EMI-MGM
Love Thy Neighbour	Feature film (co-written with Vince Powell, 1973)	Hammer Films; Anglo-EMI
