= Pearl Connor-Mogotsi =

British theatrical and literary agent, actress and cultural activist (1924–2005)

- Born: Pearl Cynthia Nunez; 13 May 1924; Diego Martin, Trinidad and Tobago
- Died: 11 February 2005 (aged 80); Johannesburg, South Africa
- Other name: Pearl Connor
- Education: Rose Bruford College
- Occupations: Theatrical and literary agent, actress and cultural activist
- Spouses: Edric Connor (m. 1948; died 1968) Joe Mogotsi (m. 1971)
- Children: 2, including Geraldine Connor

Pearl Connor-Mogotsi (née Nunez; 13 May 1924 – 11 February 2005), was a Trinidadian-born theatrical and literary agent, actress and cultural activist, who was a pioneering campaigner for the recognition and promotion of African Caribbean arts. In the UK, in the 1950s, she was the first agent to represent black and other minority ethnic actors, writers and film-makers, and during the early 1960s was instrumental in setting up one of Britain's first black theatre companies, the Negro Theatre Workshop. In the words of John La Rose, who delivered a eulogy at her funeral on 26 February 2005: "Pearl Connor-Mogotsi was pivotal in the effort to remake the landscape for innovation and for the inclusion of African, Caribbean and Asian artists in shaping a new vision of consciousness for art and society."

== Early years in Trinidad ==
Pearl Cynthia Nunez, the ninth of her parents' 12 children, was born in Diego Martin, Trinidad, to Albert Antonio Nunez and Georgina Agnes Fitt, and had a convent school education in Port of Spain. Describing her background, in an interview with Yvonne Brewster, she said: "I came from a family of educated mixed-race people in Trinidad, and we were readily exposed to music and the arts in general and the folklore....And our education was of course in the same pattern as most of the colonials. It was a British education and an English education, so we were doing Shakespeare and all that kind of thing and all the modern poets and Dickens. We were quite familiar in our secondary school education with those writers, so we had an idea what drama was, but it was the folk theatre that imbued me with the interest I had in the theatre." Her first experience of performance was at the Little Carib Theatre, founded by Beryl McBurnie, who became her greatest influence.

== Life in London ==
In 1948, Pearl met and subsequently married in England the Trinidadian folk-singer and actor Edric Connor (1913–1968), with whom she eventually had two children: Peter and Geraldine. She had gone to the UK to study law at King's College, London University, but she deferred her studies to manage her husband's career.

In 1956, the couple began an agency for black artists, The Edric Connor Agency, which in the 1970s would be renamed the Afro-Asian-Caribbean Agency, representing people from the Caribbean, Malaysia, India and Africa across all art forms. Among the many actors, dancers, musicians and writers represented by the agency in the 20 years of its existence were Carmen Munroe, Ram John Holder, Corinne Skinner, Lloyd Reckord, Patti Boulaye, Nina Baden-Semper, Yemi Ajibade, Allister Bain, George Harris, Johnny Sekka, Osibisa, Joan Armatrading, and Earl Lovelace. The agency was also involved in the co-production of several films, most notably Carnival Fantastique (1959) and the cricket series West Indies vs England (1963), and in addition distributed other landmark films such as Pressure (London, 1975), Bim (Trinidad, 1974), Smile Orange (Jamaica, 1976), The Harder They Come (Jamaica, 1972) and King Carnival (Trinidad).

Connor-Mogotsi herself trained at the Rose Bruford College of Speech and Drama and was a broadcaster for the BBC General Overseas Service, working for their Caribbean Service and in radio plays on the Corporation's domestic networks, including The Barren One (1958); My People and Your People (1959), a "West Indian ballad opera" broadcast on the BBC Home Service; and Jan Carew's The Riverman (1968). She occasionally acted on the stage – as in Barry Reckord's You in Your Small Corner at the Royal Court in 1960 – and in television or film roles, including a cameo in Lindsay Anderson's O Lucky Man! (1973).

In 1961, Connor-Mogotsi was integral in setting up one of the first black theatre companies in Britain, the Negro Theatre Workshop (NTW), and co-founding the West Indian Theatre Trust to support it. The NTW emerged after a meeting at the Mercury Theatre, Notting Hill Gate, with a number of black actors and writers, including Nina Baden-Semper, George Browne, Ena Cabayo, Leo Carrera, Tony Cyrus, Horace James, Bari Johnson, Carmen Munroe and Bobby Naidoo. Rehearsing at the West Indian Students' Centre in Earls Court and the newly opened Africa Centre in Covent Garden, the NTW launched in November that year at the Lyric Theatre in Hammersmith with a production of A Wreath for Udomo, adapted by William Branch from the novel by Peter Abrahams, and with a cast that featured Earl Cameron, Edric Connor, Lloyd Reckord and Joan Hooley. Another notable NTW production was of Wole Soyinka's The Road (1965), which was first staged for the Commonwealth Arts Festival. In 1966 the NTW also produced an interpretation of the Easter story entitled The Dark Disciples, which was televised and represented Britain at the First World Festival of Negro Arts in Dakar, Senegal.

In the 1960s, Connor-Mogotsi was a member of the Caribbean Artists Movement (CAM) and the Campaign Against Racial Discrimination (CARD).

== Cultural activism ==
In the early 1970s, Pearl was managing Kenyan band, Matata. She got them work in the UK and Europe as well as a job as the opening at for Miles Davis. The group were eventually signed to President Records.

In 1971, three years after Edric Connor's death, she married Joe Mogotsi (1924–2011), leader of the South African singing group The Manhattan Brothers, and together they organised tours throughout the world for black South African artists. They also co-authored the book Mantindane – "He Who Survives": My Life with the Manhattan Brothers (2002).

In 1972, she was awarded Trinidad and Tobago's Hummingbird Silver Medal for "outstanding services to the immigrant community in the United Kingdom".

In 1992, she was an interviewee in the two-part BBC television documentary Black and White in Colour, directed by Isaac Julien, which examined the contribution of black and Asian people to British television history from the birth of television in 1936 to 1992. In 1995, Connor opened the 12th International Book Fair of Radical Black and Third World Books in London.

On 20 January 1997, she gave the first talk in the "Life Experience With Britain" series of talks and conversations at the George Padmore Institute in London.

== Death and legacy ==
Connor Mogotsi died, aged 80, on 11 February 2005 in Johannesburg, South Africa, where she had gone with Mogotsi for the premiere of the film Sophiatown. Her funeral took place at St Martin's Church, Kensal Green, on 26 February.

The Edric and Pearl Connor Papers, 1941–1978, were donated to the Alma Jordan Library at the University of the West Indies, St Augustine, Trinidad & Tobago, and a collection of additional related items is housed in the Schomburg Center for Research in Black Culture.
