= Negro Theatre Workshop =

English theatre company started 1961

The Negro Theatre Workshop (NTW) was set up in London, England, in 1961, becoming one of the first Black British theatre companies. It aimed to produce dramas, revues and musicals, giving writers a chance to see their work performed as well as creating opportunities for black artists and technicians to gain experience, so as to develop and improve standards in every branch of theatre. As noted by Professor Colin Chambers, "The company emphasised inclusivity in its repertoire and ethos."

Instrumental in establishing the NTW was Pearl Connor, who was Administrator and Honorary Secretary, with other founding members including Edric Connor, Lloyd Reckord, Bari Johnson, Horace James, George Brown, Bobby Naidoo, Nina Baden-Semper, Tony Cyrus and Ena Cabayo.

== Background ==
The George Padmore Institute holds archive material related to the NWT, with the description: "As an ensemble of professional and amateur actors, directors and writers, the NTW performed original works in community centres, town halls, churches and cathedrals up and down the country as well as representing the United Kingdom at the First World Festival of Negro Arts in Dakar (Senegal)." Links were forged between the NTW and a range of organisations, individuals and movements, among them the Movement for Colonial Freedom, War on Want, the West Indian Standing Conference, The Church Army, and the Council for British African Relations. In addition, the NTW boasted "an impressive list of Patrons including the Archbishop of Canterbury, Joan Littlewood, Sir Laurence Olivier and Sir Learie Constantine, and the Board of Trustees were the Earl of Listowel, Andrew Salkey, Christian Simpson and David Pitt and the NTW was supported by major figures in show business such as Sidney Poitier, Spike Milligan and Tony Richardson."

Although the NTW could never afford its own base, it rehearsed free of charge at the Africa Centre, and held classes and produced plays in churches, town halls and community centres, as well as theatres.

== Productions ==
In late 1961, a production of A Wreath for Udomo (a dramatization by William Branch of the Peter Abrahams 1956 novel of the same name) previewed at the Lyric, Hammersmith, to launch the NTW, featuring Earl Cameron and Edric Connor. "Unfortunately, Edric collapsed during the next performance on the official opening night, and the understudy was not ready to go on. Pearl [Connor] had difficulty getting the money the NTW was owed from the show's producers, and the trauma left the company in disarray. It was not until 1964 that the NTW mounted its first own production, Bethlehem Blues, which was followed by two more biblical shows, The Dark Disciples, which was adapted for BBC TV, and The Prodigal Son." In 1965 the company staged a production of Wole Soyinka's The Road at the Theatre Royal, Stratford East, for the Commonwealth Arts Festival.

In 1966, at the first World Festival of Negro Arts in Dakar, Senegal, The Dark Disciples was the production with which the NTW was invited to represent Britain (along with the Pan African Players, another British group, led by Yulisa Amadu Pat Maddy, which performed its only show, Obi Egbuna's Wind versus Polygamy). According to Chambers: "That year, the NTW also received an Arts Council grant of £300, probably the first awarded to a black theatre company, and produced Henry A Zeiger's Mr Hubert, an American play about a Harlem Everyman figure with a cast of more than thirty. As it toured the country, the NTW added to its repertoire plays by Walcott, Hill and Chekhov (adapted to the Caribbean), and programmes of poetry, song, dance and music. By the time of Edric Connor's death in 1968, funding for a base had not been found, and the company had ceased to be active."

The NTW additionally contributed to the development of black film in Britain by co-producing and distributing titles such as Edric Connor's Carnival Fantastique (1960), Trevor Rhone's Smile Orange and Horace Ové's Pressure (1976).
