= William Branch =

William Branch may refer to:

- William Branch Giles (1762–1830), American statesman, senator and governor of Virginia
- William A. B. Branch (1847–1910), American politician and US representative from North Carolina
- William B. Branch (1927–2019), African-American playwright and editor
- William Roy Branch (1946–2018), British/South-African herpetologist
- Billy Branch (born 1951), American harmonicist
- The Ambassador (rapper) (William Branch), Christian hip hop artist
