= Rakie Ayola =

Welsh actress (born 1968)

- Born: Rakie Olufunmilayo Ayoola; 11 May 1968 (age 58); Cardiff, Wales
- Education: Royal Welsh College of Music & Drama
- Occupation: Actress
- Years active: 1993–present
- Spouse: Adam Smethurst (m. 2004)
- Children: 2
- Relatives: Jack Smethurst (father-in-law)
- Website: rakieayola.com

Rakie Olufunmilayo Ayola (born 11 May 1968) is a Welsh actress known for her work in theatre and television. She is best known for her role as Kyla Tyson in the BBC medical drama Holby City from its eighth to eleventh series. Ayola has also appeared in television shows including Kaos, Grace, Shetland, No Offence, Midsomer Murders, Black Mirror, Doctor Who, Silent Witness and EastEnders, a number of Shakespearean theatrical performances and feature films such as Now Is Good, Great Moments in Aviation, The i Inside, Dredd, and Sahara. She has won a BAFTA and two BAFTA Cymru for her work in the BBC One drama Anthony and The Pact.

In 2017, Ayola took over the role of Hermione Granger in the West End production of Harry Potter and the Cursed Child. In 2020, she won the Best Female Actor in a Play award at the Black British Theatre Awards for her performance in On Bear Ridge for National Theatre Wales and the Royal Court.

Ayola is an advocate of increased ethnic representation in the entertainment industry, and in 2001 founded her own production company, producing the short film Persephone's Playground for the Cannes Film Festival in order to further her campaign.

== Early life ==
Ayola was born in Cardiff on 11 May 1968 to a Sierra Leonean mother and a Nigerian father. She was raised by her mother's cousin and his wife in Ely, Cardiff. Ayola's heritage means she is Yoruba by descent, although she does not speak the language. Ayola studied at Windsor Clive Primary and Glan Ely High School, and was a member of the Orbit Youth Theatre, South Glamorgan Youth Theatre, South Glamorgan Youth Choir and the National Youth Theatre of Wales. She left high school before sitting her A Levels in order to pursue her ambition of becoming an actress. She explains: "I've always wanted to act. I decided at 16 I wanted to make my living acting, but even if I couldn't, I’d be in an amateur theatre company." She then went on to attend the Royal Welsh College of Music and Drama, studying for a three-year acting diploma. Her first acting role was for the Welsh Eisteddfod when still at primary school, playing a lady-in-waiting at the court of King Arthur. Ayola has stated that it was Barbra Streisand's performance in Hello, Dolly! that inspired her to act as a child, though credits her adoptive mother with encouraging her to act professionally. Ayola's first job was selling jeans on Bessemer Road Market in Cardiff. She worked as a chambermaid whilst attending drama school, and, six weeks prior to graduation, was offered a job with the 'Made in Wales' theatre company which enabled her to obtain her union card.

== Career ==
Ayola began her career in the theatre, performing in a number of Shakespearean plays including Twelfth Night, A Midsummer Night's Dream, The Tempest, The Merchant of Venice and Macbeth. She states of this: "Shakespeare keeps coming my way. I love the fact that I get to play people who are much more articulate than I'll ever be". In 1991 she played Hazel in John Godber's Up 'n' Under at the Sherman Theatre in Cardiff. Ayola has also performed in Twelfth Night in the lead roles of both Olivia and Viola. She explains: "The role of Viola didn't sit that well with me for some reason but Olivia makes more sense." She has also appeared in modern performances, assuming the title role of Dido, Queen of Carthage at the Globe Theatre in London in 2003, which she described as "a dream of a part". She has identified her dream role to be that of Isabella in Measure for Measure, as she once lost out on the part and would like to prove herself capable of playing it.

Ayola's first film appearance was in the 1993 film Great Moments in Aviation, written by Jeanette Winterson, in which she starred alongside Jonathan Pryce and John Hurt. Variety's David Rooney said of her performance: "In the film's most naturalistic turn, Ayola is a constant pleasure to watch. Unforced and appealing, she often succeeds in pulling the fanciful fireworks momentarily back down to Earth." Ayola recalls having been daunted at the prospect of working alongside so many established names, but has said it was a "wonderful experience". Her subsequent film credits are romantic comedy The Secret Laughter of Women, set in Nigeria and starring Colin Firth, thriller The i Inside, filmed in Sully Hospital, Cardiff, and starring Ryan Phillippe, and Sahara, filmed in Morocco whilst Ayola was pregnant with her first child, starring Penélope Cruz. Ayola says of her film career: "I really like doing film [but] I've not done enough big films though to really know the difference between film and television."

Ayola's first major television role was in the ITV drama Soldier Soldier, in which she starred throughout its third series in 1993 as soldier's wife Bernie Roberts. Ayola credits her chemistry with co-star Akim Mogaji, who played her on-screen husband Luke Roberts, for winning her her audition. She went on to appear in Gone With the Wind sequel Scarlett, and star in Welsh soap opera Tiger Bay. She has spoken critically of the way the BBC treated the soap, moving it around the schedules and declining to commission a second series. She acted alongside Pauline Quirke in both Maisie Raine and Being April, deeming Quirke to be a "fantastic" actress, and one she would work alongside again "like a shot". In 1996, Ayola appeared at the National Theatre in Helen Edmundson's adaptation of Leo Tolstoy's War and Peace. In 2001, she became a presenter of the BBC Wales arts programme Double Yellow, alongside poet Owen Sheers and performance artist Mark Rees. She posed nude but for a pair of yellow rubber gloves to promote the show's launch, and was highly critical of the BBC when the show was cancelled midway through its second series. She has since concluded that "the kind of audience they would like to bring in with shows like Double Yellow aren't really into watching TV", but at the time was outspoken against the show's cancellation, stating:

I'm still really angry about Double Yellow, about how the whole thing was handled. I was very proud of it. It was something innovative from BBC Wales for a change. So it didn't find its audience, and of course you can't force people to watch it, so if it wasn't going to get a third series then fine, that happens all the time. But the way the BBC axed it mid-series was unforgivable. [...] It left everyone very, very miserable, and very dispirited, and it made me angry. [...] Also, I have to say that Double Yellow was nominated for a Bafta Cymru award. As far as I'm aware, the BBC only allowed it to be nominated for that one award, for the graphics. We had fantastic editors, sound people, camera people, and the directors were all amazing. All those professionals whose work has just been thrown out - I hate that.

Ayola's other notable television appearances include the BBC psychological thriller Green-Eyed Monster (2001), soap opera EastEnders (2001), Waking the Dead (2001), London's Burning (2001), Offenders (2002), Murder in Mind (2003), The Canterbury Tales (2003) and Sea of Souls (2004). In 2008, she starred in the Doctor Who episode "Midnight", playing an intergalactic Hostess alongside David Tennant's Tenth Doctor. In 2009, Ayola starred in the CBBC musical comedy My Almost Famous Family. She stated: "The script made me laugh out loud when I read it. [...] I also like the fact that there were a lot of politically-correct boxes being ticked, but the writers and producer haven't been restrained by that. "So, instead of bowing to this altar, they've said, 'Okay, we have this family that's half-black, half-white, half-American, half-British. We have a mix of boys and girls, one character who's mixed-raced and deaf – but we're not going to be restrained by any of that. We're not going to tiptoe around Martha's disability or anything.' I liked that. It wasn't some sort of reverential hands-off approach to what we're presenting." She has also been cast in the film Dredd. In 2016 she played Amber Haleford in "Tuesday's Child", S6:E2 of Vera. She joined the cast of Harry Potter and the Cursed Child at the Palace Theatre, London from 24 May 2017, playing the role of Hermione Granger. In 2017 Ayola founded Shanty Productions with her husband Adam Smethurst.

In 2020, she won the Best Female Actor in a Play award at the Black British Theatre Awards for her performance in On Bear Ridge for National Theatre Wales and the Royal Court.

=== Holby City ===
From 2006 to 9 2008, Ayola starred in BBC medical drama Holby City as nurse Kyla Tyson. She had previously appeared in Holby City's sister show Casualty, and had made an appearance in Holby City's fifth series as patient Marianne Lawson. She was approached about returning to the show in a more permanent role by BBC casting director Julie Harkin. After a series of three meetings, a year after the birth of her first child, she agreed to assume the role of Kyla, despite being "nervous about signing such a long contract", stating: "I've been someone who's loved the uncertainty of acting. I've loved that one month it's Sahara in Morocco and the next I'm doing a stage play, then it's a six-part telly thing. But last summer I started thinking it would be really nice not to have to look for a job every couple of weeks. It would be nice just to stay put for a while. If I'm going to be a working mum I'd rather just be one rather than be one intermittently. And then Holby came along, so I'm very grateful".

Ayola signed a three-year contract to play Kyla, and described herself as "very similar" to her character, speaking positively about her working relationship with co-stars Jaye Jacobs and Sharon D. Clarke, as well as the "dream" storylines her character was given. She said of the show:

"I really love Holby and I'm surprised how much. What thrills me about Holby is that you get back what you put in. The powers that be are only as interested in you as they think you are in the job. For me it's about more than turning up and saying the lines. It's about understanding it and trying to make it better. That's actually a lot of fun. What's great is nobody says, 'Just shut up.' They want you to work at it. [...] I surprise myself sometimes because after two and a half years sometimes I see friends on the side of a poster and I think, 'do I want to do something else?' but I really like this job, I never get that awful 'dread' feeling when you really don’t want to go into work."

In October 2008, Ayola announced that she would be departing from Holby City in order to have a second child, stating: "I've had a great time and I'll miss it. I made the decision purely because I was pregnant, but I wasn't really ready to put down the character of Kyla. I'm very sorry to have to let her go."

=== Race and charity work ===
Throughout her career, Ayola has been outspoken on the subject of racial discrimination in the entertainment industry. Describing her motivation, she states: "I am not an overtly political person. I just want fairness". Ayola believes that black actors receive less recognition than their white counterparts, explaining; "If you get a show with six stars and one is black you are more likely to see interviews with the five white actors. [...] They are not being sold as a reason to watch." She believes that her career would have taken her in a different direction were she not Black, stating: "I could not have played any of the roles I have played on TV if I was white [...] I am very aware of where the glass ceiling is and it's still very low and expectations are still very low". She has noted having casting directors accept the notion of characters being both black and Welsh to be a particular problem, explaining that: "I get offered a lot of very different roles, but they're never Welsh. [...] The one time I was asked to play a Welsh character on screen was in Tiger Bay for BBC Wales, but I know if that series had been called Radyr Park or Cyncoed Close I wouldn't have been in it". In 2001, Ayola founded a production company and directed a short film entitled Persephone's Playground. She presented the film at the Cannes film festival, using it as part of her campaign for increased black representation in theatre, films and television. The project, however, was largely unsuccessful, with Ayola stating: "it just made me decide that if there's anything I don't want to do, it's produce films, because I'm rubbish at it. I was so bad with the budget that I just said yes to everything and then had to worry about how to pay for things at the end." In 2008, Ayola offered her support to the Action for Southern Africa campaign Dignity! Period, aiming to provide affordable sanitary protection to Zimbabwean women.

=== Awards ===
Ayola was nominated and shortlisted for the 'Female Performance in TV' award in the 2006 Screen Nation Awards, for her role as Kyla Tyson in Holby City. She received Honourable Mention for the same role the following year, and was shortlisted again in 2008. In 2005, WalesOnline voted Ayola the 29th sexiest woman in Wales, saying of her: "One of our favourite thesps, she's black, beautiful and the term "yummy mummy" should have been made for her." She placed 40th in 2008, with the Western Mail noting: "the last 15 years have only seen Rakie become more beautiful and more successful". Ayola placed 17th in the awards in 2009. Rakie is a Trustee of ACT, the Actors' Children's Trust, and an Ambassador of PIPA, Parents in Performing Arts. In 2021, she won a BAFTA for her role in the BBC One drama Anthony. In 2023, Ayola was the 18th recipient of the BAFTA Cymru Siân Phillips Award. At the same ceremony she also won the BAFTA Cymru Best Actress Award for her performance in BBC1 series The Pact Season 2.

== Personal life ==
Ayola has a collection of troll dolls, and played the Moomintroll character Too-Ticky in BBC Radio 4's production of Tove Jansson's Moominland Midwinter.

She has an interest in travel, and has visited places such as Peru and Kenya. She has "a romantic notion of travelling around Europe in a camper van". Ayola often speaks of her pride in her Welsh upbringing, describing herself as "an Ely girl through and through". She was made a Fellow of the Royal Welsh College of Music and Drama in 2003.

During a 1998 production of Hamlet, Ayola met her future husband, fellow actor Adam Smethurst, son of Love Thy Neighbour star Jack Smethurst. They met again two years later, during a production of Twelfth Night, and went on to become a couple. The pair married in May 2004, and Ayola gave birth to their first daughter in July that year. Their second daughter was born in January 2009.

== Filmography ==
Ayola has undertaken the following roles from her screen and televisual debut in 1993, to the present day.

=== Film ===
Year	Title	Role
1993	Great Moments in Aviation	Gabriel Angel
1998	The Secret Laughter of Women	Talking Drum
2003	The I Inside	Nurse Clayton
2005	Sahara	Mrs Nwokolo
2012	Now Is Good	Phillippa
2012	Dredd	Chief Judge
2018	Been So Long	Martina
2025	Bad Apples	Sylvia
2026	Black Church Bay	Mrs Munro

=== Television ===
Year	Title	Role	Notes
1993	Nightshift		
1993	Soldier Soldier	Bernie Roberts	Series 3
1993	Going Underground: A Better Life Than Mine	Lauren	
1994	Scarlett	Pansy	Mini-series
1997	Tiger Bay	Helen Jarrett	8 episodes
1998	Casualty	Karen Goddard	"Trapped", series 13 episode 19
1998	Maisie Raine	DC Helen Tomlin	12 episodes
2001	London's Burning	Nina	Series 13 episode 1
2001	Waking the Dead	Pauline	Episode "A Simple Sacrifice" parts 1 & 2
2001	The Green-Eyed Monster	Leila	
2001	EastEnders	Miss French	
2001	The Armando Iannucci Shows		3 episodes
2001	Double Yellow	Presenter	
2002	Being April	Taneshia	6 episodes
2002	Offenders	Tyla	6 episodes
2003	Holby City	Marianne Lawson	"By Any Other Name", series 5 episode 32
2003	Murder in Mind	Cally	Episode "Stalkers"
2003	The Canterbury Tales	Nicky Constable	Episode "The Man of Law's Tale"
2004	Sea of Souls	Yemi Adeoya	Episode "That Old Black Magic" parts 1 and 2
2006	The Window	Mojisola	
2006	Holby City	Kyla Tyson	Series 8-11
2008	Doctor Who	Hostess	"Midnight", series 4 episode 10
2008	Bargain Hunt Famous Finds	Self	Series 1, episode 8, with Jack Smethurst
2009	My Almost Famous Family	Shalondra Swann	
2011	Black Mirror	Shelly	"The National Anthem"
2012	Stella	Hilary	Episode 9
2012	Silent Witness	Annie Farmer	Episode "Paradise Lost"
2015	Midsomer Murders	Alice Winning	Episode 17.3 " The Ballad of Midsomer County"
2017	No Offence	Nora Attah	Series 2
2019	Shetland	Olivia Lennox	Series 5
2021	Grace	Assistant Chief Constable Vosper	
2021	Noughts and Crosses	Prime Minister Opal Folami	
2021	The Pact	Ds Holland	6 Episodes
2022	The Pact	Christine Rees	Series 2 6 Episodes
2024	Kaos	Persephone	
2024	Gavin & Stacey The Finale	The Registrar	

=== Video games ===
Year	Title	Role	Notes
2021	Evil Genius 2: World Domination	Zalika	A playable character
