= Adam Smethurst =

English actor and writer

- Occupations: Actor, writer
- Years active: 1994–present
- Spouse: Rakie Ayola (m. 2004)
- Children: 2
- Father: Jack Smethurst

Adam Smethurst is an English actor and writer. He has appeared in TV dramas including Casualty, Marple and Lewis, is the son of Love Thy Neighbour star Jack Smethurst, and is married to fellow actor Rakie Ayola, with whom he has two daughters.

== Personal life ==
Smethurst is the son of Love Thy Neighbour star Jack Smethurst. During a 1998 production of Hamlet at the Birmingham Repertory Theatre, Smethurst met his future wife, Rakie Ayola. Ayola has stated that there was initially "no spark" between them, however they met again two years later during a production of Twelfth Night, and went on to become a couple. Asked to describe what attracted her to Smethurst, Ayola responded: "He's a very nice, uncomplicated man, but I saw something deeper in him. I also liked his incredible cheerfulness and openness and he has grown up with sisters so that made him easy with women." Smethurst proposed to Ayola by giving her a locket, containing a scroll which read "Will you marry me?". They married in May 2004, and Ayola gave birth to their daughter Tansy in July that year. Ayola has explained that they planned the wedding before discovering her pregnancy, and although they had been trying to conceive for around eighteen months, she failed to recognise the initial symptoms and instead believed herself to be diabetic. In the early years of their marriage, Smethurst and Ayola struggled financially, and she has spoken of her worry that she may have to cease acting, shortly before being offered the role of Kyla Tyson in the BBC medical drama Holby City. In October 2008, Ayola announced that she was pregnant with the couple's second child.

== Filmography ==
Smethurst has undertaken the following roles from his televisual debut in 1994, to the present day.

Year	Title	Role	Notes
1994	Make Love Last		
1994	Business Planning		Informational video
1994	The Bill	Graham	Episode "Parental Guidance"
1998	Getting the Message Across		Informational video
2004	Heartbeat	Reporter	Episode "Mountains and Molehills"
2006	Lewis	Locksmith	Pilot episode
2006	Hustle	Detective Sergeant	Episode "Law and Corruption"
2006	Silent Witness	Policeman	Episode "Cargo, Part 1"
2006	Robin Hood	Fuller	2 episodes
2007	Marple	Cab driver	Episode "At Bertram's Hotel"
2008	Casualty	Alan Perriman	Episode "Saturday Night Fever"
2018	Twelfth Night	Director	
