= Mine Boy =

1946 novel by Peter Abrahams

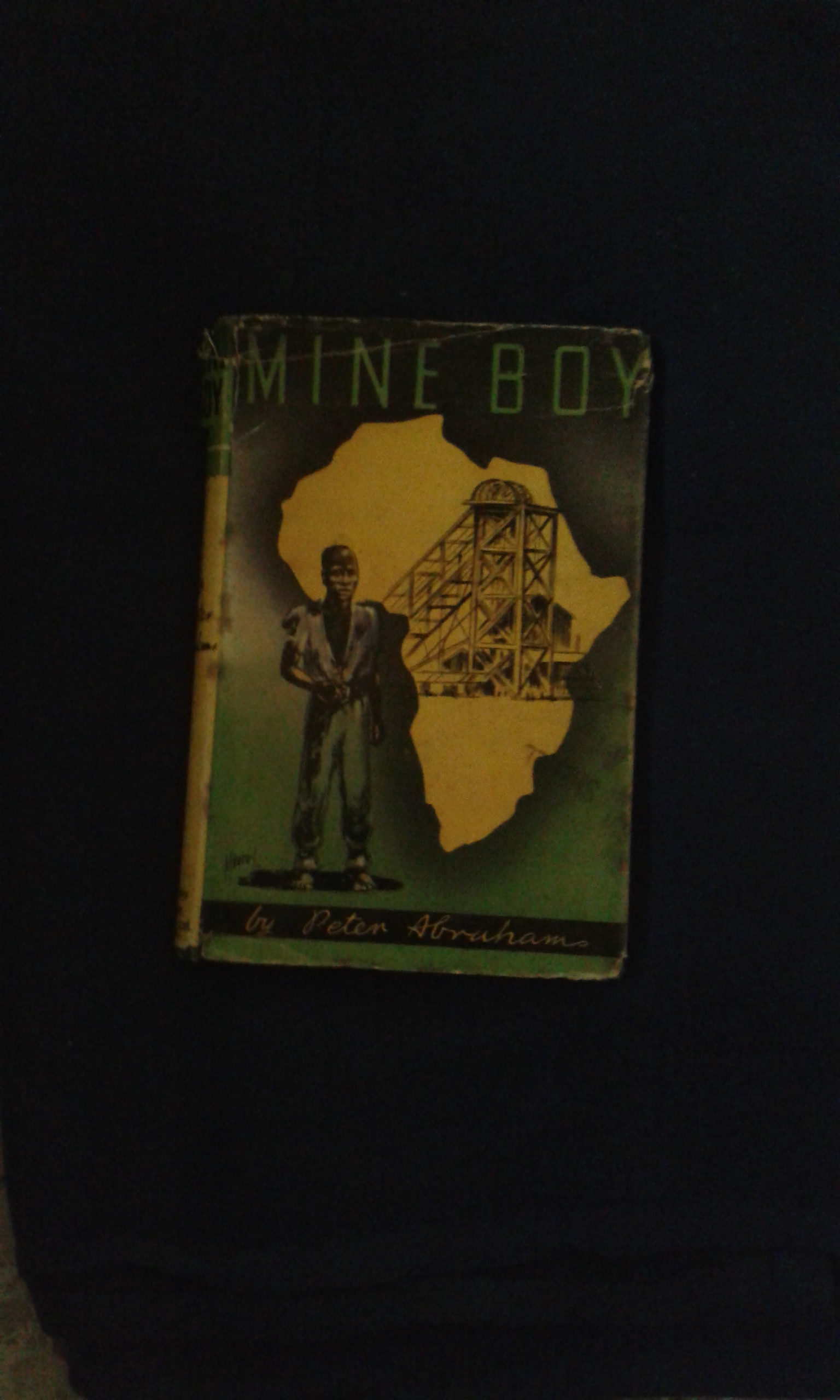

Mine Boy is a 1946 novel by South African novelist Peter Abrahams. Set in racist South Africa during the lead-up to apartheid, the novel explores the stereotypes and institutions that discriminate against working-class black Africans. According to Nigerian scholar Kolawole Ogungbesan, Mine Boy became "the first African novel written in English to attract international attention."

== Plot ==
The plot follows a black miner, Xuma, as he goes through a number of struggles, including introduced disease from Europeans as well as political and social trauma. Xuma moves from his town to Malay camp, a black area of Johannesburg, in search of work at the gold mines. Leah, an illegal beer brewer, gives him a place to live. Xuma is against the racist treatment of black Africans and fights it. Xuma falls in love with Leah’s niece, Eliza, who is assimilationist, and then with Maisy. Xuma becomes a successful miner, working for the supervisor Paddy. One of Leah's tenants, Johannes, and others, die in a mine accident and Xuma and Paddy lead a strike.

== Scholarship ==
Critic Sally-Anne Jackson focuses on the novel's thematic interest in the disease and trauma introduced by colonial rule. Rodney Nesbitt wrote about the structure, style, tone, and themes of the novel. Claude J. Summers notes that the book does not mention "same sex pairings among migrant laborers" in the mines, although the practice of young men and boys becoming "wives of the mine" with older men is well known, and documented back to the 1930s. Megan Jones writes about space in the novel, and the movement of the characters through the urban space of Johannesburg and what this reveals about the "organisation of urban life by racist capitalism." Erasmus Aikley Msuya writes a linguistic analysis of Xuma and Leah's speech in the novel and what it reveals about them.

== References in other works ==
In Abdulrazak Gurnah's first novel, Memory of Departure, the main character meets a young man on the train to Nairobi who is reading Mine Boy.
