= Louise Archambault Greaves =

Cinematographer (1932–2023)

- Born: October 8, 1932; Verdun, Quebec
- Died: March 4, 2023 (aged 90); Manhattan, US
- Occupations: President of William Greaves Productions, filmmaker
- Spouse: William Greaves
- Children: 3
- Website: http://www.williamgreaves.com

Louise Archambault Greaves (October 8, 1932 - March 4, 2023) was a filmmaker, director, producer, screenwriter, curator, and researcher. She is known for her work as a co-producer and director with William Greaves on films such as; Ralph Bunche: An American Odyssey, Symbiopsychotaxiplasm: Take 2 1/2, Wealth of a Nation, and The Deep North.

== Career ==
In 1964 Louise and William Greaves founded the William Greaves Production Company in New York City. The company is an independent film production and distribution company. The company distributes its work to libraries, schools, colleges, community and cultural institutions.

=== Wealth of a Nation ===
The documentary Wealth of a Nation was filmed in 1964. It introduces the revolutionary vision of four artists: Bill Dixon, trumpeter, artist, and professor of Black Music; Lee Bontecou, artist; William Katavolos, architect; and Paolo Soleri. Soleri was known as a visionary architect. His philosophy was called arcology. The basic concept that architecture and ecology are not separate.

=== Symbiopsychotaxiplasm ===
Symbiopsychotaxiplasm is an experimental documentary hybrid film, using cinéma vérité style of filming. Richard Brody is quoted in 2015 in The New Yorker as saying, "What if they made a revolution and nobody saw it? That's what happened in 1968, when William Greaves filmed one of the most daring and original movies of the time, 'Symbiopsychotaxiplasm: Take One'."

In 1993, Symbiopsychotaxiplasm produced by Louise and William Greaves was shown at the Sundance Film Festival. In 2001 after years of post-development the film was reproduced as Symbiopsychotaxiplasm: Take One. In 2006 - A new sequel was produced called Symbiopsychotaxiplasm: Take 21/2.

The film follows, and documents the process of making a film; as a group of actors participate in an audition. It filmed what was going on in front of the camera, filming the filming being made, what was going on between the actors, and the environment. The idea was to capture pure reality using Cinéma vérité style. In effect the documentary Symbiopsychotaxiplasm created a documentary inside a documentary inside of a documentary.

The title of the film is related to the term symbiotaxiplasma. The term was coined by Social Philosopher Arthur F. Bentley. The term Symbiotaxiplasm sees Art as Experience and social interconnectedness.

== Filmography & Video ==
- 2006 - Discovering William Greaves (Video)
- 2005 - Symbiopsychotaxiplasm: Take 2 1/2 (Documentary) (co-producer). This film was an early form of Cinéma vérité
- 2001 - Ralph Bunche: An American Odyssey (Documentary) (co-producer) (chief researcher). The documentary Ralph Bunche: An American Odyssey directed by Louise and William Greaves documents the life of an African American that won a Nobel Peace Prize in 1950. The film documents Ralph Bunche's contribution to the founding of the United Nations. The documentary won the Gold Award for Documentary feature from the Houston International Film Festival
- 1990 - The Deep North (TV Movie) (associate producer)
- 1990 - Ida B. Wells: A Passion for Justice.

== Film Awards ==
- 2015 - Symbiopsychotaxiplasm; winner of National Film Registry - National Film Preservation Board, USA
- 2006 - Symbiopsychotaxiplasm; winner of Experimental Film Award, National Society of Film Critics Awards, USA
