= Love Thy Neighbour (1973 film) =

1973 British comedy film by John Robins

- Directed by: John Robins
- Written by: Harry Driver; Vince Powell
- Produced by: Roy Skeggs
- Starring: Jack Smethurst; Rudolph Walker; Nina Baden-Semper; Kate Williams
- Cinematography: Moray Grant
- Edited by: James Needs
- Music by: Albert Elms
- Production company: Hammer Films
- Distributed by: Anglo-EMI
- Release date: 26 August 1973
- Running time: 85 minutes
- Country: United Kingdom
- Language: English

Love Thy Neighbour is a 1973 British comedy film directed by John Robins and starring Jack Smethurst, Rudolph Walker, Kate Williams and Nina Baden-Semper. It was a spin-off from the television series Love Thy Neighbour (1972–76).

It included the last film appearance of James Beck.

== Plot ==
Eddie and Joan Booth, a white couple, live next door to Bill and Barbie Reynolds, who are black. Although Joan and Barbie are best friends, Bill and Eddie are complete opposites. Without their husbands' knowledge, Joan and Barbie enter a "Love Thy Neighbour" competition to win a cruise, but must contend with the problem of their antagonistic husbands. To add to the problems, Joan's mother-in-law is coming to stay, and Barbie's father-in-law is coming from Trinidad.

== Cast ==
- Jack Smethurst as Eddie Booth
- Rudolph Walker as Bill Reynolds
- Nina Baden-Semper as Barbie Reynolds
- Kate Williams as Joan Booth
- Bill Fraser as Mr. Granger
- Charles Hyatt as Joe Reynolds
- Patricia Hayes as Annie Booth
- Melvyn Hayes as Terry
- Keith Marsh as Jacko
- Tommy Godfrey as Arthur
- Azad Ali as Winston
- Arthur English as Carter
- Andria Lawrence as Norma
- Clifford Mollison as registrar
- Lincoln Webb as Charlie
- Norman Chappell as Indian conductor
- Anna Dawson as Betty
- Bill Pertwee as postman
- Pamela Cundell as Dolly
- Annie Leake as Lil
- Damaris Hayman as woman on bus
- Siobhan Quinlan as Carol
- James Beck as Cyril
- Dan Jackson as black groom
- John Bindon as white groom
- Lesley Goldie as white bride
- Nosher Powell as bus driver
- Michael Sharvell-Martin as police constable
- Fred Griffiths as taxi driver

== Reception ==
=== Box office ===
The film was popular at the box office and ranked as the 15th-most-popular of the year in the U.K.

=== Critical ===
David McGillivray wrote in The Monthly Film Bulletin: "Another example of domestic farce every bit as asinine and harmless as the TV series from which it derives. The staging, pacing and vaudevillian caricatures appear to be of roughly the same vintage as the jokes."

The Manchester Evening News called it "the most successful case I have seen yet of a television comedy series transferring to the big screen."

Britmovie wrote: "This dated, politically incorrect tale of bigotries and one-upmanship is sprinkled with ignorant comments and insults that are frequently more laughable than offensive when viewed today."
