= Symbiopsychotaxiplasm =

1968 film by William Greaves

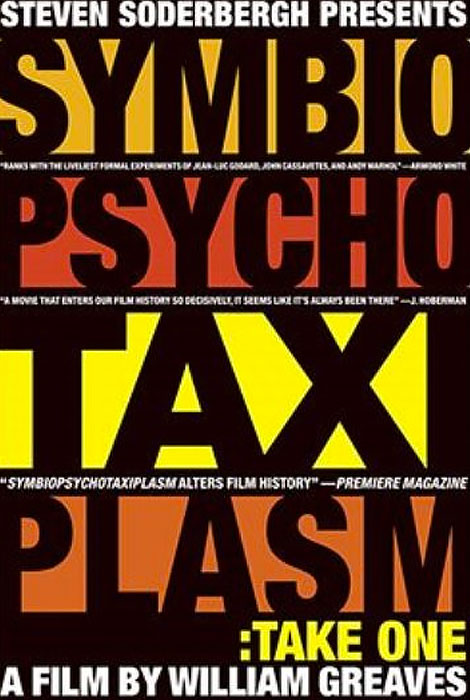
- 2005 theatrical release poster
- Directed by: William Greaves
- Written by: William Greaves
- Produced by: William Greaves; Manuel Melamed; Louise Archambault Greaves
- Starring: Patricia Ree Gilbert; Don Fellows; Bob Rosen; William Greaves
- Cinematography: Stevan Larner; Terence Macartney-Filgate
- Edited by: William Greaves
- Music by: Miles Davis
- Release dates: 1971 (Take One); October 26, 2005 (Take 2½)
- Running time: 75 minutes (Take One); 99 minutes (Take 2½)
- Country: United States
- Language: English

Symbiopsychotaxiplasm: Take One is a 1971 American experimental documentary film written, directed, co-produced and edited by William Greaves. The film is shot and presented in the style of a cinéma vérité documentary, attempting to capture and examine pure reality unhindered by the presence of the cameras all around. It is notable for the inherent layers of metatextual storytelling, with a documentary inside a documentary inside a documentary.

In 2015, Symbiopsychotaxiplasm was selected by the United States Library of Congress for preservation in the National Film Registry, deeming it "culturally, historically, or aesthetically significant."

== Development ==
Greaves's original concept for the film was to apply Heisenberg's uncertainty principle to a project that he had conceived several years earlier, in which he would follow and document a group of actors undergoing the audition process for an acting job. Finding himself dissatisfied with "Hollywood acting", which he found stiff and forced rather than loose and spontaneous as life tended to be, Greaves attempted to find new and different ways to bring out "reality", one that would not cause his subjects to "act to the camera."

The film was independently financed by one of Greaves's former students from his teaching days at the National Film Board of Canada and The Actors Studio. The title came from Greaves's own fascination with scientific concepts. The concept of symbiotaxiplasm (from roots meaning "together-life-movement-fluid") originated from Arthur F. Bentley in his book Inquiry Into Inquiries: Essays in Social Theory, which Greaves described as "those events that transpire in the course of anyone's life that have an impact on the consciousness and the psyche of the average human being, and how that human being also controls or effects changes or has an impact on the environment." By inserting "-psycho-" into the term, Greaves emphasized the mental state affected by those events.

== Symbiopsychotaxiplasm: Take One ==
Greaves shot Symbiopsychotaxiplasm: Take One (then called simply Symbiopsychotaxiplasm) in 1968 in Central Park in New York City. He brought in actors whom he had known from his work at The Actors Studio and hired three different film crews to document the proceedings. Greaves appears as the director of the fictional documentary Over the Cliff and utilizes the three film crews to each cover a different aspect of the story. Greaves instructs the first crew to film just the actors in an effort to document the audition process. He tells the second film crew to document the first film crew. He tells the third to document anything that fits into the documentary's overarching theme, including the actors, the other two film crews and any passers-by or spectators who happen to fit into Over the Cliff's overarching theme of "sexuality".

Greaves opted to perform a part rather than "playing himself." Because Greaves's director character is sexist, unfocused, unprofessional and seemingly inept, the film crews start to sow dissent, all of which is caught on camera because of the constant filming. This footage ends up in the final cut of the film and renders the film more complex. This complexity is enhanced by Greaves's editing techniques, including split screens displaying two or three perspectives at once, as well as simultaneous split screens to tell the story from three different perspectives.

Greaves creates a circular meta-documentary about a documentary, a documentary about a documentary and a documentary documenting a documentary about a documentary. Greaves's attempt to capture reality on film employs cameras in the right places at inopportune moments to discourage any short improvisations or unnatural events.

== Release ==
Following the filming in 1968, Greaves attempted to secure financing for a theatrical release. Its experimental nature and bizarre content made finding distribution through channels virtually impossible. This lack of marketability led Greaves to abandon the four sequels in his planned five-film arc.

With no other options, Greaves held onto the original print negatives until 1991, when the Brooklyn Museum held a retrospective of Greaves' work and the curator requested to show the undistributed film.

The film developed a cult status and eventually caught the attention of actor and filmmaker Steve Buscemi, who attended a screening at the 1992 Sundance Film Festival. Seeing the film's potential, Buscemi worked to secure financing for a sequel and the release of the original film. Eventually, Buscemi and Greaves were joined by director Steven Soderbergh. Together, the three managed to secure distribution channels for the film and financing for one of Greaves's sequels.

After years of post-development limbo, the film saw a theatrical and DVD release in 2006 alongside its new sequel, Symbiopsychotaxiplasm: Take 2 1/2, which continues the narrative of two of the actors from the original 35 years later.

== Critical reception ==
Over its history, Symbiopsychotaxiplasm has garnered numerous positive reviews from critics. Praised for its innovation, the film scored an 88% "fresh" rating on Rotten Tomatoes with an average score of 8.0 out of 10 across 17 reviews while scoring 71 out of 100 at Metacritic, a site that assigns average ratings based on the reviews of mainstream critics.

New York Times film critic Manohla Dargis called the film "highly entertaining and, at moments, revelatory about filmmaking as a site of creative tension between individual vision and collective endeavor," and Jeffery Anderson from CombustibleCelluloid.com described the film as "a puzzle without an answer; and the most fascinating element of all is Greaves himself. On camera, he doesn't really appear to know what he's doing. But perhaps he does?". Christopher Null, a critic at FilmCritic.com commented negatively on the film's presentation on DVD, saying: "It's too bad that the film's production values scrape rock bottom -- even by low budget standards. Much of the movie is inaudible, and the scratched up film stock gives you a headache from the get-go."

Steven Soderbergh, a longtime proponent of the film, reflected:

As you can imagine, I just thought it was one of the most amazing things I'd ever seen. I couldn't believe it. I couldn't believe how great it was and that it wasn't famous, I mean really famous. Even then, almost ten years ago, I felt maybe it's still, even now, too far ahead of its time.

It's the ultimate "reality" piece.

The difference being, in this case, that nobody was in on the joke. And that's what makes it so brilliant. When you do a reality show on TV today, you know you're part of a show and that they're going to start creating obstacles for you or trying to complicate the situation purposefully and consciously. Here, you're just watching a situation where people are absolutely convinced that Bill is out of control, doesn't know what he's doing, and you're a fly on the wall. And then the ultimate mutiny takes place. It's really incredible.

I think when he was presented with that material, he must have felt like the cinema gods were smiling on him.

== See also ==
- Kathleen Collins – American writer and filmmaker who worked on the film as a production assistant
- F for Fake - 1973 film directed by Orson Welles that is similar in content
