= Geraldine Connor =

British ethnomusicologist, theatre director, composer and performer (1952–2011)

- Born: Geraldine Roxanne Connor; 22 March 1952; Paddington, London, England
- Died: 21 October 2011 (aged 59); Harrogate, North Yorkshire, England
- Education: Camden School for Girls; Royal College of Music; Royal Schools of Music; SOAS University of London; University of Leeds
- Occupations: Ethnomusicologist, theatre director, composer and performer
- Known for: Carnival Messiah
- Parent(s): Pearl Connor and Edric Connor
- Website: www.gcfoundation.co.uk

Geraldine Connor, PhD, MMus, LRSM, DipEd (22 March 1952 – 21 October 2011), was a British ethnomusicologist, theatre director, composer and performer, who spent significant periods of her life in Trinidad and Tobago, from where her parents had migrated to Britain in the 1940s. Her father was actor, singer and folklorist Edric Connor and her mother was theatrical agent and cultural activist Pearl Connor. Geraldine Connor is best known for having written, composed and directed Carnival Messiah, a spectacular work that "married the European classical tradition of oratorio with masquerade and musical inspiration from the African diaspora". For more than 20 years, she lived in Skelmanthorpe in Yorkshire, England, where she went in 1990 as a lecturer at the University of Leeds.

== Early years ==
Geraldine Roxanne Connor was born in Paddington, London, into an artistic Trinidadian family and was the elder child of her parents Edric and Pearl Connor. Spending her early childhood with her grandparents, who were both teachers in Trinidad, Geraldine was schooled at Tranquillity Primary (1960–63) and Diego Martin Government Secondary (1963–68). She then attended Camden School for Girls in London, from 1968 to 1971. She went on to graduate from London's Royal College of Music in 1974, subsequently returning to Trinidad to continue her studies. She earned a diploma of education from Valsayn Teacher Training College (1979–81) and in 1981 became a licentiate of the Royal Schools of Music in classical voice, meanwhile teaching music from 1976 to 1984 at Queen's Royal College, and conducting extramural vocal classes at the University of the West Indies.

She worked with choirs, vocal soloists, and instrumental and folk ensembles both as an educator and as a performer, in which capacity she toured with productions of Porgy and Bess, Showboat and Carmen Jones. In the 1970s, she was a backing singer for reggae star Jimmy Cliff as part of a group called the Sunbeams. As a vocalist she also worked with Bob Marley and Tom Jones and sang in the original recording of the rock opera Jesus Christ Superstar. In Trinidad she was deeply involved with the steel-pan movement, and she said of her participation in the annual Panorama steel band competition held at carnival time: "I was the first woman to play bass in the then Trintoc Invaders 1977–1983 and in 1984 was the first woman to arrange a Panorama tune for them. Indeed I might have been the first woman to arrange for a Panorama competition."

She returned to London to work as education supervisor of Brent Black Music Co-operative (1984–87), and also worked with great success on arrangements for Ebony Steel Band, based in Notting Hill.

== Educational work ==
In 1990, she moved to Yorkshire to take up the post of senior lecturer in Multicultural Music at the University of Leeds, later being appointed senior teaching fellow and lecturer on the BA (Hons.) Popular Music Studies degree course at Bretton Hall.

She was awarded a master of music degree in ethnomusicology from the School of Oriental and African Studies, London University, in 1995, with a dissertation based on research into "Culture, identity and the music of Notting Hill carnival". In 2006, she completed her doctorate at the Centre for Cultural Studies in the University of Leeds, with a thesis regarding "Caribbean consciousness, identity, and representation".

== Theatrical work ==
As a theatre practitioner, Connor was active composing, performing and directing in a wide variety of projects, among which feature writing the music for Jean "Binta" Breeze's Spirit of the Carnival (Birmingham Rep, 1994), appearing in The Man Who Lit Up the World at the Hackney Empire (1991), and co-directing Chesa Chesa for the Adzido Pan African Dance Ensemble at the Queen Elizabeth Hall (2001). Her forte was typified by large-scale, spectacular productions incorporating music and dance. Her most ambitious creation was Carnival Messiah, which reimagined of Handel's masterpiece with a cast of more than a 100, being first staged in 1999 by the West Yorkshire Playhouse – where in September 2003 Connor was seconded for two years as associate director – and subsequently being performed internationally, drawing record audiences of up to 27,000. At the invitation of the Trinidad and Tobago government, Carnival Messiah had sold-out at Queen's Hall, Port of Spain, in 2003 and in 2004, and in 2008 excerpts were showcased at London's Royal Albert Hall.

Her other successes as a director include Margaret Busby's historical drama Yaa Asantewaa—Warrior Queen, a co-production between the West Yorkshire Playhouse and Adzido Pan-African Dance, which toured the UK and Ghana in 2001–02, Vodou Nation (2004), a multi-media reflection of Haiti, Blues in the Night (2005), and a production at the West Yorkshire Playhouse of the reggae-based musical derived from the iconic 1972 film The Harder They Come.

== Recognition and awards ==
In 2007, marking the bicentenary of the Abolition of the Slave Trade Act, Connor in partnership with David Lascelles, now the 8th Earl of Harewood, staged Carnival Messiah in the grounds of Harewood House, which was built in the 18th century with funds from slave trading.

In 2009, she was awarded Trinidad and Tobago's second highest national honour, the Chaconia gold medal.

== Death and legacy ==
Connor died aged 59 on 21 October 2011 at Harrogate District Hospital, in Harrogate, North Yorkshire, following a heart attack. Her funeral on 4 November at St Aidan's Church, Leeds, attended by hundreds of mourners, was followed by a reception at the West Yorkshire Playhouse. In March 2012, to mark what would have been her 60th birthday, a special gala evening took place at the Theatre Royal Stratford East. In addition, David Lascelles (who in July 2011 had succeeded his father as Earl of Harewood) organised a concert in her memory at West Yorkshire Playhouse. Commemorations also took place in Trinidad, including at the Holy Trinity Cathedral, Port of Spain.

In 2012, the Geraldine Connor Foundation was established, an arts organisation that aims to continue her legacy "by creating a variety of creative projects that inspire others, be they artists, young people or communities, to experience exceptional art across diverse forms."

In 2020, during the COVID-19 pandemic, the Geraldine Connor Foundation organised an on-line event to celebrate Windrush Day. The event was hosted by Leeds poet Khadijah Ibrahiim and academic Emily Zobel Marshall. Guests were the writer Colin Grant, the poet Linton Kwesi Johnson, the musician Christella Litras and Camille Quamina from Jamaica.

Connor's name is one of those featured on the sculpture Ribbons created by Pippa Hale, "championing some of Leeds most inspirational women", and unveiled in 2024 outside Leeds Playhouse.
