= A Wreath for Udomo =

1956 novel by Peter Abrahams

- First US edition (publ. Knopf)
- Author: Peter Abrahams
- Language: English
- Publication date: 1956

A Wreath for Udomo is a 1956 novel by the South African novelist Peter Abrahams. The novel follows a London-educated black African, Michael Udomo, who returns to Africa to become a revolutionary leader in the fictional country of Panafrica and is eventually martyred. The novel explores a revolutionary politics, exploring the diversity of actors and political communities needed to overcome colonial oppression.

The novel was controversial at the time of its publication, because it represented revolutionary independence from a tropical African country, before the first such independence by the Gold Coast. Critic Bernth Lindfors described the character of Udomo as being modeled off real revolutionary leaders in Africa, including Kwame Nkrumah, Jomo Kenyatta and Nnamdi Azikiwe.

== Critical reception ==
Kirkus Reviews in May 1956 generally received the novel well, describing it as "a powerful story [...] it has its moments of tenderness in first one, then another love story". But Kirkus also expresses discomfort with the novel, noting that is "disturbing, violent" and "wont be an easy book to place, for the moral code, the sexual code is remote from our understanding."

The Wilson Library Bulletin in September 1957called the novel Abraham's "most effective contribution so far to world understanding of the racial problems of Africa."

== Stage play ==
A Wreath for Udomo was the title of a stage play adapted from Abrahams' novel by New York playwright William Branch. The play was a success when first produced in the US in 1960, and subsequently in London by the Negro Theatre Workshop at the Lyric Theatre in 1961 (featuring Earl Cameron and Edric Connor).
