= National Black Political Convention =

African-American civil rights convention

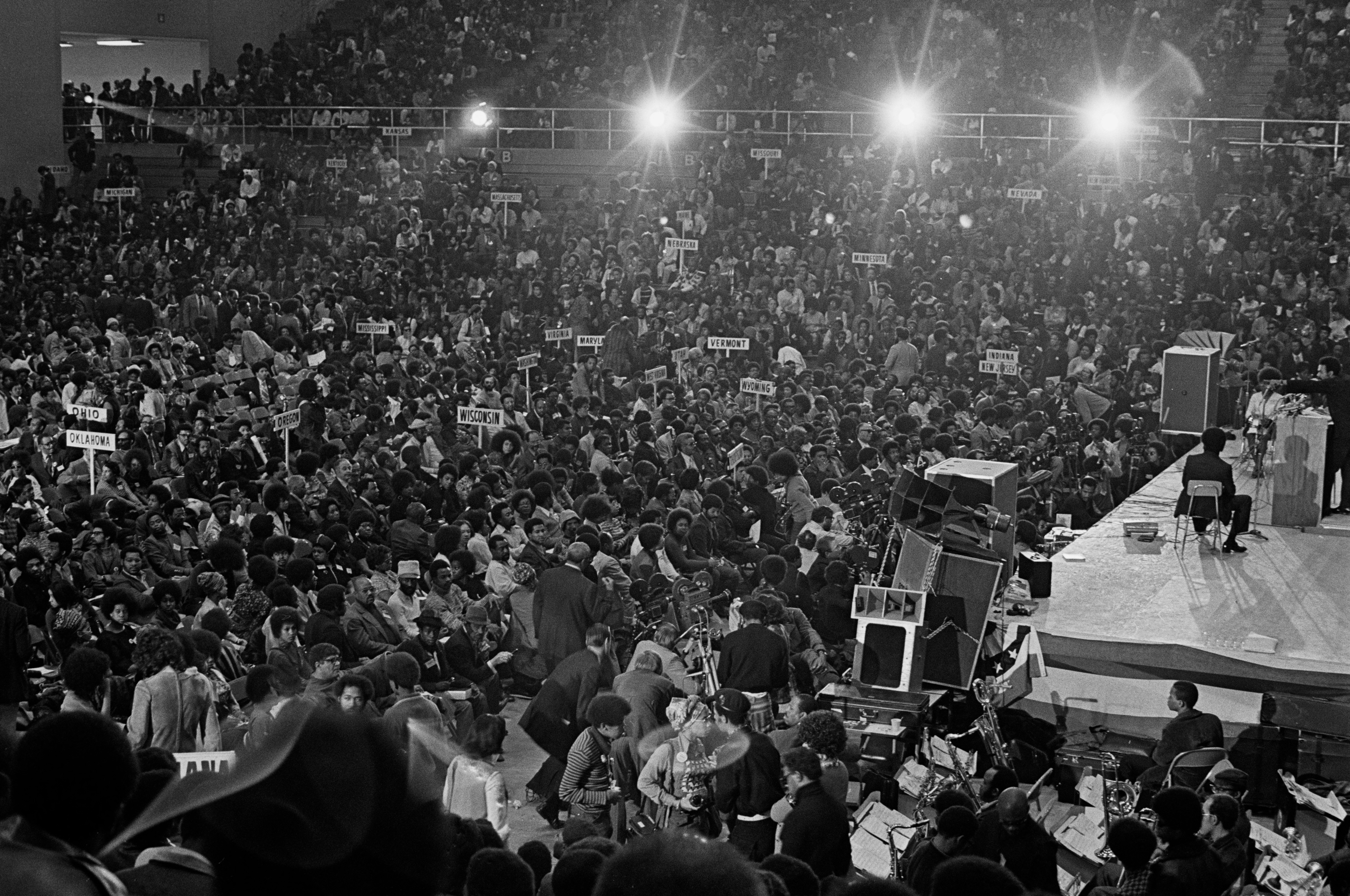
Delegates crowd Gary's West Side High School, March 11, 1972

The National Black Political Convention, or the Gary Convention, was held on March 10–12, 1972 in Gary, Indiana. The convention gathered around ten thousand African-Americans to discuss and advocate for black communities that undergo significant economic and social crisis. Part of their goal was to raise the number of black politicians elected to office, increase representation, and create an agenda for fundamental change. The convention also issued the Gary Declaration, which stated that the American political system was failing black Americans and that the only way to address this problem was to transition to independent black politics.

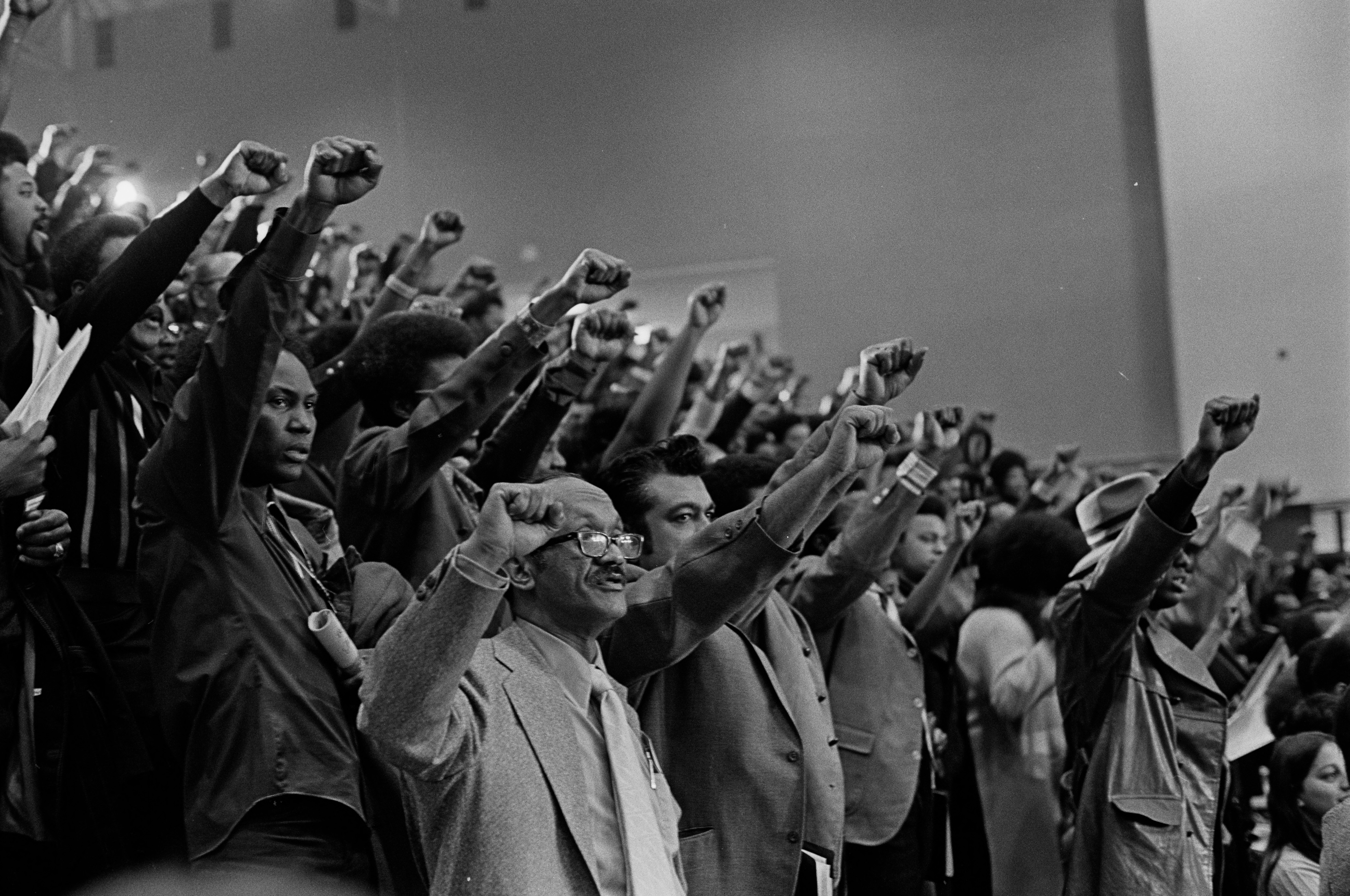
Delegates to the convention raise their fists in the Black Power salute, March 11, 1972

Notable participants in the convention included Gary mayor Richard Hatcher, civil rights activist Jesse Jackson, and House Representative Charles C. Diggs Jr. Diggs Jr. and Hatcher were the two keynote speakers of the convention.

Filmmaker William Greaves' 1972 documentary Nationtime, narrated by Sidney Poitier, covers the National Black Political Convention. An 80-minute restored version was released in 2020 with funding from Jane Fonda and the Hollywood Foreign Press Association.
