= The Fighters (1974 film) =

1974 film

- Directed by: Rick Baxter; William Greaves
- Starring: Muhammad Ali; George Foreman; Joe Frazier; Burt Lancaster
- Release date: 1974
- Running time: 142 min.
- Country: United States
- Language: English

The Fighters (also known as Ali, the Fighter or Ali the Man: Ali the Fighter) is a 1974 documentary film directed by Rick Baxter and William Greaves. With Muhammad Ali, Joe Frazier, Richie Havens, and Burt Lancaster. The film stars Muhammad Ali, George Foreman, Joe Frazier and Burt Lancaster in the lead roles.

== Cast ==
- Muhammad Ali
- George Foreman
- Joe Frazier
- Burt Lancaster as Narrator
