= Still a Brother =

1968 documentary

Still a Brother: Inside the Negro Middle Class
- Directed by: William Greaves
- Written by: William B. Branch; William Greaves
- Narrated by: Ossie Davis
- Edited by: William Greaves
- Production company: National Educational Television
- Release date: April 29, 1968 (United States)
- Running time: 90 minutes
- Country: United States
- Language: English

Still a Brother: Inside the Negro Middle Class is a 1968 documentary film directed by William Greaves.

== Development ==
Still a Brother was written by William B. Branch and directed by William Greaves. It was narrated by Ossie Davis.

After the film was finished, Greaves encountered difficulty in convincing National Educational Television (NET) to air it, saying that "They had expected an Ebony magazine kind of film." It aired on NET a few weeks after the assassination of Martin Luther King Jr. in April 1968.

== Synopsis ==
The documentary featured interviews from Black middle-class professionals across a wide variety of careers. It emphasizes Black dignity and achievement. The film sought to contrast their experiences with the experiences of both Black radicals and white middle-class professionals; and describe a situation in which the Black middle class are reaching economic security but without social equity or equality. The film also touches on issues with housing, the role of religion in Black nationalism, and the rise of African-American culture.

Horace Wesley Morris, associate director of the New York Urban League (NYUL) is featured. Also appearing in the film are John H. Johnson, president of Johnson Publishing Co; Robert E. Johnson, editor of Jet magazine; Cathy Aldridge of the New York Amsterdam News; St. Clair Drake, sociologist and professor at Roosevelt University; Ralph Featherstone of SNCC; Julian Bond, Georgia legislator; Bayard Rustin, director of the A. Philip Randolph Institute; Percy Julian, a research chemist and millionaire; and Nathan Wright, Episcopal Minister and organizer of the 1967 Newark Black Power Conference.

== Reception ==
Still a Brother was positively received upon release. Jack Gould, writing in The New York Times, praised the construction of the documentary but criticized the repetition of some points.

The film ran 90 minutes but it was later edited down into a 60 minute piece and re-aired in 1969. In 1969, Greaves was nominated for an Emmy Award for his work Still a Brother, which also won the Blue Ribbon Award at the American Film Festival.

A few years later a television documentary film called, "To Be Black" aired on ABC, which also explored the Black middle class.

== See also ==
- Bob Herbert
