= Keith Marsh =

English actor (1926–2013)

- Marsh in Daleks' Invasion Earth 2150 A.D. (1966)
- Born: 10 January 1926; Blackpool, Lancashire, England, United Kingdom
- Died: 28 January 2013 (aged 87); Hillingdon, London, England
- Occupations: Television and film actor
- Years active: 1956–2005
- Spouse: Madeleine Newbury (m. 1954; div. 1959)

Keith Marsh (10 January 1926 – 28 January 2013) was an English actor who appeared in numerous television productions over a 50-year period. He is perhaps best known for playing Jacko in the Thames Television sitcom Love Thy Neighbour (1972–76), who had the catchphrase "I'll have half!"

== Roles ==
Other TV appearances include Coronation Street, in which he appeared as a foreman (1961), George Chippendale (1966), James Dawson (1972), George Marsden (1980), Harry Ashton (1988) and Uncle Mervin (1999). He also appeared in George and the Dragon, Edna, the Inebriate Woman, Last of the Summer Wine, ‘’Special Branch’' (1974, series4, ep12), and The Bill. In 1985 Marsh appeared in The Beiderbecke Affair as "Harry" (the man with the dog called Jason).

His film work included Quatermass and the Pit (1967), Arthur? Arthur! (1969), Taste the Blood of Dracula (1970), Scrooge (1970), the film version of Love Thy Neighbour (1973), The Human Factor (1979) and the role of Conway in the film Daleks' Invasion Earth 2150 A.D. (1966).

== Death ==
Marsh died in January 2013, aged 87 of prolonged health conditions.

== Filmography ==
Year	Title	Role	Notes
1958	The Diary of Samuel Pepys	Servant	Episode: #8
1960	The Gentle Trap	Pete The Barman	
1961-1999	Coronation Street	Various Roles	
1965	Othello	Senator	
1966	Daleks' Invasion Earth 2150 A.D.	Conway	
1966	The Family Way	Fish and Chip Van Proprietor	Uncredited
1966–1968	George and the Dragon	Ralph	
1967	Quatermass and the Pit	Johnson	
1967	River Rivals		
1969	All Neat in Black Stockings	Wedding Guest	Uncredited
1969	Arthur? Arthur!	Lillywhite	
1970	Taste the Blood of Dracula	Father	
1970	Scrooge	Well Wisher	
1972-1976	Love Thy Neighbour	Jacko	
1973	Love Thy Neighbour	Jacko	
1979	The Human Factor	Porter	
1980-1990	All Creatures Great and Small	George Hindley/Mr. Howell	
1983	The Gaffer (TV series)	Henry Dodd	
1983	My Cousin Rachel	Rev. Pascoe	Miniseries
1983	Jane Eyre	Dr. Lloyd	Miniseries
1986	Lovejoy	Auctioneer	Episode: The Firefly Cage
1986	Casualty	Arthur	Episode: Survival
1989	A Bit of a Do	Percy Spragg	Episode: The White Wedding The Dentists' Dinner Dance
1991-1997	The Bill	Mr. Allen/Len Blackmore	2 episodes
1992	The Young Indiana Jones Chronicles	Bishop	Episode: The Curse of the Jackal
1997	Last of the Summer Wine	Sweep	Episode: A Clean Sweep
1997	Dalziel and Pascoe	Edgar Masson	Episode: Deadheads
2005	Doctors	Terrance Fisher	Episode: No Place Like Home
2005	The Worst Week of My Life	Mr McGrath	Episode: Friday (series 2)
