= Love Thy Neighbour (Australian TV series) =

- Region 4 DVD release, with In Australia subtitle to distinguish from the British series
- Genre: Sitcom
- Written by: Vince Powell; Ken Sterling
- Starring: Jack Smethurst
- Country of origin: Australia
- No. of series: 1
- No. of episodes: 7

Production
- Running time: 25 minutes

Original release
- Network: Seven Network
- Release: 9 April – 21 May 1980

Love Thy Neighbour is a seven-episode Australian television sitcom which debuted on ATN-7 in Sydney on 9 April 1980. Most of the episodes were broadcast in Melbourne beginning the following month. It was produced as a sequel to the British series Love Thy Neighbour (1972–1976) featuring one of the major protagonists Eddie Booth (Jack Smethurst). The central concept is that Eddie has relocated to Australia and intends to send for his wife and child once he has settled. While the earlier series had focused on Eddie's rivalry with his neighbour Bill Reynolds, the sequel focused on a new set of relationships unrelated to the original show's premise. Here, he is boarding with a married couple, Joyce and Bernard, and conflicting with his Dutch-Australian next door neighbour, Jim Lawson, played by Russell Newman. External scenes were shot in Auburn Road, Auburn NSW with 191 Auburn Road serving as Joyce, Bernard and Eddie's home.

== Cast ==
- Jack Smethurst as Eddie Booth
- Russell Newman as Jim Lawson
- Robert Hughes as Bernard Smith
- Sue Jones as Joyce Smith
- Graham Rouse as Cyril
- Ken Goodlet as Joe Marley
- Kevin Leslie as Charlie
- Gordon McDougall as Vicar
- Kris McQuade as Liz
- Rouna Daley as Sally
- Ron Shand as Arnold
- Fred Steele as Information Officer
- Frank Lloyd as Doctor
- Lynne Porteous as Barmaid
- Mervyn Drake as Airline Steward
- Lex Marinos as Kitty

== Bibliography ==
- Howard Maxford. Hammer Complete: The Films, the Personnel, the Company. McFarland, 2018.
