= Jack Smethurst =

English actor (1932–2022)

- Born: 9 April 1932; Collyhurst, Manchester, Lancashire, England
- Died: 16 February 2022 (aged 89); Chorleywood, Hertfordshire, England
- Occupation: Actor
- Years active: 1958–2022
- Spouse: Julie Nicholls (m. 1957)
- Children: 4; including Adam
- Relatives: Rakie Ayola (daughter-in-law)

John Smethurst (9 April 1932 – 16 February 2022) was an English television and film comic actor. He was best known for his role as Eddie Booth in the British television sitcom Love Thy Neighbour.

== Early life ==
Smethurst was born on 9 April 1932 in Collyhurst, Manchester. He performed national service in the Royal Air Force and trained as an actor at the London Academy of Music and Dramatic Art.

== Career ==
Smethurst made his film debut in 1958's Carry On Sergeant. This was followed by parts in the films Saturday Night and Sunday Morning (1960), A Kind of Loving (1962), Run with the Wind (1966), Night After Night After Night (1970), the big-screen version of Please Sir! (1971) and the ITV sitcom For the Love of Ada (1970–71) amongst others, before he landed the role for which he is best known—that of bigoted socialist and union leader, 'brother' Eddie Booth in Love Thy Neighbour. The programme ran for eight series between 1972 and 1976. During this run he also appeared in the 1974 film version of the sitcom Man About the House. He reprised his role as Eddie Booth for the 1979 sequel Love Thy Neighbour in Australia.

After Love Thy Neighbour ended, Smethurst's film appearances were rare, but included Chariots of Fire (1981), the John Goodman vehicle King Ralph (1991; which re-united him with his Love Thy Neighbour co-star Rudolph Walker) and 1996's La Passione.

Smethurst made a guest appearance as Davenport in Britain's longest-running television sitcom Last of the Summer Wine in 1997.

Smethurst played four different characters in Coronation Street: a brewery drayman in 1961, and in January 1967 Percy Bridge, who tried to con Elsie Tanner. Between 1980 and 1983, he occasionally appeared as Johnny Webb, one of the men on Eddie Yeats' bin round. In 2001, he returned for several months as Stan Wagstaff, a friend of Jimmy Kelly, who left his allotment to Jack Duckworth. Together with his brother Ernie, Stan let Jack in on Jimmy's big secret—he used his allotment shed to brew poteen.

Smethurst also starred in Vince Powell’s seven-part BBC Radio 2 slice-of-life sitcom A Proper Charlie in 1984, as factory worker Charlie Garside. Madge Hindle played his wife with Jane Hazlegrove and Jason Littler as their daughter and son. A second series of eight episodes followed at the end of 1985.

Smethurst worked on stage in Australia when he appeared in the play Run for Your Wife during 1987 and 1988, and the production toured the country. Other members of the cast were David McCallum, Eric Sykes and Katy Manning. Smethurst appeared in a production of Agatha Christie's And Then There Were None in 1999.

Smethurst played the "Man in Phone Box" in S5/E8 (1995) of the British sitcom Keeping Up Appearances. In the episode, Hyacinth Bucket tries to get Smethurst's character to relinquish a public telephone booth, which leads her husband, Richard, to yell at her forcefully for the only time in the entire series.

== Personal life and death ==
Smethurst married actress Julie Nicholls in 1957. The couple had four children including Adam Smethurst, who also became an actor.

Smethurst died at his home in Chorleywood on 16 February 2022, aged 89.

== Selected filmography ==
Year	Title	Role	Notes
1958	Carry On Sergeant	First Recruit	
1960	Watch Your Stern	Sailor	
1960	Saturday Night and Sunday Morning	Waiter	Uncredited
1961	On the Fiddle	Dai Tovey	
1962	A Kind of Loving	Conroy	
1964	The Main Chance	Ross	
1966	Doctor in Clover	Long-Haired Patient	Uncredited
1966	Run with the Wind	Bernie	
1969	Night After Night After Night	Chief Inspector	
1971	The Yes Girls	Sam Hed – detective	
1971	Please Sir!	Coach Driver	
1972	For the Love of Ada	Leslie Pollitt	
1973	Love Thy Neighbour	Eddie Booth	
1974	Man About the House	Jack Smethurst	
1981	Chariots of Fire	Sleeping Car Attendant	
1991	King Ralph	Miranda's Father	
1992	Don't Tell Father	Ron Whipple	3 episodes
1996	La Passione	Mickey O'Farrell	
1998	Dinnerladies	Bob Bellfield	
Main source:
