= Edric Connor =

Caribbean singer, folklorist and actor (1913–1968)

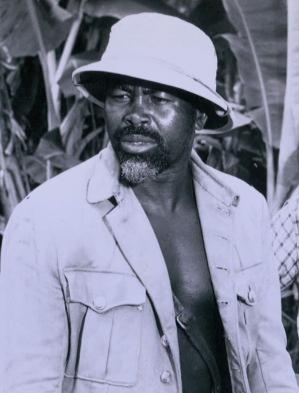
- Connor in The Roots of Heaven (1958)
- Born: Edric Esclus Connor; 2 August 1913; Mayaro, Trinidad
- Died: 13 October 1968 (aged 55); London, England
- Occupations: Singer, folklorist and actor
- Spouse: Pearl Connor (m. 1948)
- Children: Geraldine Connor

Edric Esclus Connor (2 August 1913 – 16 October 1968) was a Caribbean singer, folklorist and actor who was born in Trinidad and Tobago. He was a performer of calypso in the United Kingdom, where he migrated in 1944 and chiefly lived and worked for the rest of his life until he died following a stroke in London, at the age of 55.

== Early life and education ==
Edric Esclus Connor was born in 1913 in Mayaro, Trinidad. When he was 16 he won a Trinidad government scholarship to study engineering at the Victoria Institute, Port of Spain, and on his own he also studied Caribbean folk singing.

== Career ==
During World War II he worked on the construction of the American naval air base in Trinidad. Having saved enough money to go to Britain, initially with the intention of continuing his engineering studies, he settled there in 1944, making his debut on BBC Radio two weeks later, in Calling the West Indies, a programme for listeners in the Caribbean.

In 1951, he was responsible for bringing the Trinidad All Steel Percussion Orchestra – TASPO – to the Festival of Britain. In 1947, during the UK tour of the Broadway hit Anna Lucasta, which starred the original African American cast with black British understudies, Pauline Henriques, Errol John, Earl Cameron, and Rita Williams, were inspired by Connor to co-found the Negro Theatre Company. In 1955, he recorded the first Manchester United Football Club song, the "Manchester United Calypso" (written by Eric Watterson and Ken Jones).

In 1955, Connor and his wife Pearl, whom he had married in 1948, set up the Edric Connor Agency, representing black actors, dancers, writers and musicians, which eventually, in the 1970s, she ran under the name of the Afro-Asian-Caribbean Agency. In the early 1960s, they founded the Negro Theatre Workshop, one of the UK's earliest black theatre groups.

Connor appeared at London's Prince's Theatre in 1956 in Summer Song, the life told through the music of Antonín Dvořák, in which Connor was "given two of the show's most memorable moments in 'Deep Blue Evening' and 'Cotton Tail'", which he subsequently recorded. In 1958, he became the first black actor to perform for the Royal Shakespeare Company in Stratford, playing Gower in Pericles, having been recommended for the role by Paul Robeson. Connor acted in 18 films, including his role as harpooner Daggoo in Moby Dick (1956), directed by John Huston and co-starring Gregory Peck and Richard Basehart.

Connor co-starred with Rita Hayworth, Robert Mitchum, and Jack Lemmon in the 1957 film Fire Down Below (1957), directed by Robert Parrish, playing Jimmy Jean, the third man on the "boat-for-hire" with Mitchum and Lemmon.

In 1952, with his band "The Caribbeans" (subsequently called The Southlanders) Connor recorded, according to the AllMusic website, a "groundbreaking LP of Jamaican folk music" entitled Songs from Jamaica. This recording of songs was based on a collection made by a British Council staff member in Jamaica, Tom Murray, entitled Folk Songs of Jamaica, published by Oxford University Press in 1951. Murray had arranged thirty Jamaican songs for voice and piano, and Edric Connor's recording generally uses Murray's arrangements. Although Connor's accent is slightly 'un-Jamaican' (as Connor came from Trinidad), the recording was very influential. The group included the song "Day Dah Light", which portrayed the hard life of Caribbean field workers. The song was later recorded by Jamaican folk singer Louise Bennett in 1954, and was rewritten in 1955 by Irving Burgie and William Attaway. The version performed by Harry Belafonte became known as "Day-O", reaching number five on the Billboard charts in 1957.

Connor's acting for television included roles in the espionage series Danger Man as the character Thompson in "Deadline" (1962, the final episode of the original series, which featured an almost entirely black cast), and as opposition leader Dr Manudu in the series 2 episode entitled "The Galloping Major" (first aired on 3 November 1964; the revived series is known as Secret Agent in the United States).

Connor directed the "Caribbean Carnival" event held in London's St Pancras Town Hall at the end of January 1959, organised by fellow Trinidadian Claudia Jones, and televised by the BBC.

He appeared on the BBC programme Desert Island Discs on 13 April 1959, when one of his choices was "Deep Blue Evening", from the show Summer Song, a recording on which he was a soloist.

== Legacy ==
His daughter Geraldine Connor (1952–2011) – herself a singer and ethnomusicologist – was instrumental in bringing to light her father's autobiography, Horizons: The Life and Times of Edric Connor 1913–1968, which was written in the mid-1960s and only finally published in 2006. In 2005, Geraldine accepted an award on behalf of the Connor family from the British Association of Steelbands, in celebration of her family’s contribution to the Promotion of Steelband Music, Caribbean Art, Culture and Heritage throughout the United Kingdom. The Edric and Pearl Connor Papers, 1941–1978, were donated to the Alma Jordan Library at the University of the West Indies, St Augustine, Trinidad & Tobago, and additional material on them is housed in the Schomburg Center for Research in Black Culture.

A prestigious annual award named after him, the Edric Connor Inspiration Award, is made annually in his honour in the Screen Nation Film and Television Awards. It was won by Joseph Marcell in 2012 and in 2011 by Trevor MacDonald, with other previous winners including Moira Stuart (2007), Mona Hammond (2006) and Lenny Henry (2002). In 2014 the award was posthumously given to Felix Dexter.

His name is also associated with the Edric Connor Trailblazer Award, of which a notable winner in 2003 was Rudolph Walker (who, coincidentally, in 1989, like Connor before him, also played Gower in Shakespeare's Pericles).

Connor's "Manchester United Calypso" can still regularly be heard on the terraces at Old Trafford.

== Filmography ==
Year	Title	Role	Notes
1951	Cry, the Beloved Country	John Kumalo	
1954	West of Zanzibar	Ushingo	
1956	Moby Dick	Daggoo	
1957	Fire Down Below	Jimmy Jean	
1957	Seven Thunders	Abou	
1958	The Vikings	Sandpiper	
1958	Virgin Island	Captain Jason	(US: Our Virgin Island)
1958	The Roots of Heaven	Waitari	
1961	King of Kings	Balthazar	
1963	4 for Texas	Prince George	
1968	Only When I Larf	Awana	
1968	Nobody Runs Forever	Julius	(final film role)

== Selected discography ==
Edric Connor and the Caribbeans

- Songs From Jamaica (Argo Records, 1954)

Edric Connor and the Southlanders

- Songs from Trinidad (Argo, 1955)
- Calypso (1955)

Edric Connor with Ken Jones and His Music

- "Manchester United Calypso" (Watterson–Jones)/ "Yorumba Highlife" (Oriole, 1957)

== Bibliography ==
- The Edric Connor Collection of West Indian Spiritual and Folk Tunes, arranged for voice and piano, Boosey & Hawkes, 1945.
- Horizons: The Life and Times of Edric Connor 1913–1968, an autobiography; with foreword by George Lamming and introduction by Bridget Brereton and Gordon Rohlehr (Kingston, Jamaica: Ian Randle Publishers, 2007).
