= William Greaves =

American documentary filmmaker

- Greaves making his 1968 film Symbiopsychotaxiplasm
- Born: William Garfield Greaves; October 8, 1926; New York City, New York, U.S.
- Died: August 25, 2014 (aged 87); New York City, New York, U.S.
- Education: City College of New York; Actors Studio
- Occupations: Documentary filmmaker, actor
- Years active: 1947–2001
- Children: 3

William Garfield Greaves (October 8, 1926 – August 25, 2014) was an American filmmaker and actor. Trained at the Actors Studio, he worked as a stage and film actor but became disillusioned with the roles available to Black performers, and transitioned into a career as a documentarian at the height of the civil rights movement. He produced more than 200 documentaries, and wrote and directed more than half of these. He garnered many accolades for his work, including four Emmy nominations.

== Early life ==
Greaves was born in Harlem in New York City on October 8, 1926. He was one of seven children of taxi driver and minister Garfield Greaves and the former Emily Muir. After graduating from the elite Stuyvesant High School at the age of 18, Greaves attended City College of New York to study science and engineering, but eventually dropped out to pursue a career in theater. Starting as a dancer, he eventually moved into acting, working in the American Negro Theatre.

== Career ==
=== Acting and film training ===
In 1948, Greaves joined the Actors Studio and studied alongside the likes of Marlon Brando, Julie Harris, Anthony Quinn, Shelley Winters, and others. During this time, he undertook a number of roles on the stage and in the theatre, but eventually grew dissatisfied with the roles in which he was being cast. Miracle in Harlem (1948) was one of the films he appeared in during this period. He also appeared in Souls of Sin (1949), one of the last race films, which saw him sing and act. Realizing that most of the parts he could play were stereotypes and derivative due to racism prevalent throughout American culture at the time, Greaves looked into African-American history. Seeing that his opportunities would be limited were he to continue to stay in America and focus on his planned course of acting, Greaves tried his hand at movie making, electing to move to Canada and study at the National Film Board of Canada.

After six years working in various stages of production from director to editing, Greaves found himself behind the camera as director and editor of a film called Emergency Ward, which focused on the goings-on of a hospital emergency room on a Sunday evening.

=== Freelance documentaries and television work ===
As the 1960s saw the rise of the Civil Rights Movement, Greaves returned to The United States to participate in the ongoing discourse regarding African-Americans and their place in society. Based on his work on Emergency Ward, he was hired by both the United Nations and the film division of the United States Information Agency (USIA) to make several documentaries, the two most acclaimed of which were Wealth of a Nation, an examination of personal freedom as a key boon to America's strength, and The First World Festival of Negro Arts (1968), which documented the 1966 World Festival of Black Arts, a celebration of both African and African-American culture.

In 1969, following soon after the 1968 assassination of Martin Luther King Jr., public broadcasting syndicate National Educational Television (a direct predecessor to the modern-day PBS) began to air a show called Black Journal with a mission to present news by African Americans, for African Americans, and about African Americans. After a tumultuous opening during the first few tapings, the NET network promoted Greaves from co-host to executive producer of the show. Greaves ran the show until 1970 winning an Emmy award for himself and the show in 1969.

=== After Black Journal ===
In 1970, after working on Black Journal for three years, Greaves opted to leave television to focus on film making. In 1971 he released a film titled Ali, the Fighter, which focused on Muhammad Ali's first attempt to regain his professional boxing heavyweight title. Greaves then went on to produce and make films for various commissions and government agencies, including NASA and The Civil Service Commission.

After this, Greaves produced numerous works, including From These Roots, Nationtime: Gary, Where Dreams Come True, Booker T.Washington: Life and Legacy, Frederick Douglass: An American Life, Black Power in America: Myth or Reality?, The Deep North, and Ida B. Wells: A Passion for Justice, which was narrated by Nobel Prize in Literature and Pulitzer Prize winning author Toni Morrison. Greaves' 1972 documentary Nationtime centered on the National Black Political Convention in Gary, Indiana, and was narrated by Sidney Poitier. An 80-minute restored version was released in 2020 with funding from Jane Fonda and the Hollywood Foreign Press Association.

In 2001, Greaves released one of his most ambitious works Ralph Bunche: An American Odyssey. According to Greaves, between attempting to secure funds and researching countless old manuscripts, photos, and newsreel footage, the film took him ten years to make. The final product was edited down from an initial cut of seventeen hours to two hours for the PBS show American Odyssey. The final project, narrated by Sidney Poitier, sought to bring the name of Ralph Bunche back into the public lexicon as Greaves felt he was an important, yet forgotten, political figure, one important to African-American history and the Civil Rights Movement.

Greaves co-directed a secret documentary with his son David, Once Upon a Time in Harlem, which documented a party hosted by Greaves in 1972 with the then-living members of the Harlem Renaissance. Following Greaves' death in 2014, David completed the film and premiered it at the 2026 Sundance Film Festival, with Greaves' granddaughter Liani serving as producer. The documentary premiered to critical acclaim, which led to a bidding war that led to Neon acquiring it for a theatrical release later in the year.

=== Symbiopsychotaxiplasm ===
While working on Black Journal, Greaves continued to produce films out of his own production company, William Greaves productions, which he had founded in 1964. One of the films he produced in this time period was a movie that blended his interest in the acting process with documentary film, which he called Symbiopsychotaxiplasm, an experimental, avant-garde film that he shot in the cinéma vérité documentary style in 1968.

The 1971 film takes place in Central Park in New York City and follows a documentary entitled Over the Cliff, one supposedly directed by Greaves himself and focusing on different pairs of actors who prepare to audition for a dramatic piece. Greaves employed three sets of camera crews to document this audition process. The first crew focuses on the actors in an effort to document the audition process. The second documents the first film crew. The third documents the actors, the remaining two crews, and any other passers-by or spectators who happen to fit into Over the Cliff's overarching theme of "sexuality."

As the film goes on, the various film crews start to grow irritated, as they come to perceive that Greaves is an incompetent and sexist director. Divided about whether or not this entire situation is a plot by Greaves, the crews find themselves divided against him, at one point even plotting a revolt against their director. All of their doubts, insecurities, and complaints are captured on film, and, when the project is complete, they turn all of their footage over to Greaves (including the incriminating evidence). Greaves, in turn, incorporates their footage into his final product.

Through all of this, Greaves creates a giant circular meta-documentary featuring a documentary, a documentary about a documentary, and a documentary documenting a documentary about a documentary, and all in an attempt to create and capture reality on film. To add to the coherence or incoherence of the piece, the film is also edited untraditionally, with the different cameras' various shots intercut in split screens so that all three sets of simultaneous footage display the same sequence but from three perspectives.

Symbiopsychotaxiplasm was unable to find mainstream distribution and instead toured various festivals and museum screenings, gaining something of a cult status amongst those filmmakers who had seen it. It eventually caught the eye of famous actor and filmmaker Steve Buscemi who saw it at a screening at the Sundance Film Festival in 1992. Ten years later, Buscemi and director Steven Soderbergh teamed up to secure widespread distribution for the film as well as financing for the making of one of the four sequels Greaves had considered once he had finished the initial product in the late 1960s.

Symbiopsychotaxiplasm was finally released theatrically under its new title Symbiopsychotaxiplasm: Take One alongside its sequel, Symbiopsychotaxiplasm: Take 2½, in 2003. The sequel focused on two of the actors from the original and picks up the narrative of the original film some thirty-five years later.

== Personal life ==
On August 23, 1959, Greaves married Louise Archambault, who became a frequent collaborator on his projects, going so far as to even produce his documentary on Ralph Bunche. They had three children, including filmmakers David Greaves and Liani Greaves.

Between 1969 and 1982, Greaves taught acting at the Lee Strasberg Theatre and Film Institute in New York.

While not working, Greaves could be found touring various universities and cultural centers around the world presenting his films, conducting workshops, and speaking about his experiences in indie film and the process of creating film as it is to actors, directors, professionals, and more.

=== Death ===
Greaves died at the age of 87 at his home in Manhattan on August 25, 2014.

== Filmography ==
- Putting It Straight (1957)
- Smoke and Weather (1958)
- Emergency Ward (1959)
- Four Religions (1960)
- Wealth of a Nation (1964)
- The First World Festival of Negro Arts (1966)
- Black Journal (1968–1977)
- Still a Brother: Inside the Negro Middle Class (1968)
- In the Company of Men (1969)
- Symbiopsychotaxiplasm: Take One (1968)
- The Voice of La Raza (1972)
- Struggle for Los Trabajos (1972)
- On Merit (1972);
- Nationtime, Gary (1973)
- From These Roots (1974)
- The Fighters (1974)
- Every N***** Is a Star (1974)
- Power Versus the People (1974)
- EEOC Story (1974)
- Whose Standard English? (1974)
- The Marijuana Affair (1975)
- Just Doin' It: A Tale of Two Barbershops (1976)
- Opportunities in Criminal Justice (1978)
- Where Dreams Come True (1979)
- To Free Their Minds (1980)
- Space for Women (1981)
- Booker T. Washington, the Life and the Legacy (1982)
- A Plan for All Seasons (1983)
- Frederick Douglass: An American Life (1985)
- Beyond the Forest (1985)
- Fighter for Freedom (1985)
- Black Power in America: Myth or Reality? (1988)
- The Best of Black Journal (1988)
- Ida B. Wells: A Passion for Justice (1989)
- That's Black Entertainment (1990)
- The Deep North (1990)
- Resurrections: Paul Robeson (1990)
- A Tribute to Jackie Robinson (1990)
- Ralph Bunche: An American Odyssey (2001)
- Ralph Bunche: The Odyssey Continues... (2003)
- Symbiopsychotaxiplasm: Take 2 ½ (2005)
- Once Upon a Time in Harlem (2026)

== Awards and accolades ==
Besides the Emmy he won for his work as executive producer of Black Journal in 1969, Greaves was nominated for an Emmy for his work Still a Brother: Inside the Negro Middle Class, which also won the Blue Ribbon Award at the American Film Festival. Beyond these, many of his films have played at festivals and garnered numerous awards, with certain films (including Ida B. Wells) winning upwards of twenty awards across the many venues where they have been played.

In 1980, Greaves was honored alongside Robert De Niro, Jane Fonda, Marlon Brando, Arthur Penn, Sally Field, Rod Steiger, Al Pacino, Shelley Winters, Dustin Hoffman, Estelle Parsons, and Ellen Burstyn with the Actors Studio in New York's first ever Dusa Award. Also in the same year, he was inducted into the Black Filmmakers Hall of Fame and received a special homage at the first Black American Independent Film Festival in Paris. In 2008 the Full Frame Documentary Film Festival honored him with its Career Award.

Symbiopsychotaxiplasm was added to the National Film Registry in 2015.

In 2020, Firelight Media established a William Greaves Fund to support mid-career nonfiction filmmakers of color.
