= Nina Baden-Semper =

British actress (born 1945)

- Born: 1945 (age 80–81); Trinidad
- Occupation: Actress
- Known for: Love Thy Neighbour (1972–1976)

Nina Baden-Semper (born 1945) is a Trinidad and Tobago-born British actress best known for her role as Barbie Reynolds in the 1970s sitcom Love Thy Neighbour, produced by Thames Television.

== Career ==
Born in Trinidad and Tobago, Baden-Semper was a dancer when she first came to Britain, before going on to act.

In an acting career that spans more than 40 years, Baden-Semper has appeared in numerous radio, television, film and theatre productions and has toured worldwide in many plays. She has played varied stage roles in dramatic works that range from The Bacchae by Euripides, Le Bourgeois gentilhomme by Molière and The Blacks by Jean Genet to modern thrillers such as Wait Until Dark and Stepping Out, as well as comedy roles. She has been a television presenter for children’s programmes and also Morning Worship for the BBC, and has made numerous guest appearances on quizzes, talks and panel shows both nationally and internationally. Baden-Semper made two single releases and an album and was recently a rapper on a So Solid Crew video.

Becoming known on television for appearing between 1972 and 1976 in the sitcom Love Thy Neighbour that also featured Jack Smethurst, Rudolph Walker and Kate Williams, Baden-Semper has appeared in other character parts, including in the ill-fated revival of TV series Crossroads in 2002. In 2006, she guest-starred in the Doctor Who audio adventure Memory Lane. In the BBC Two black magazine showcase The A-Force, she appeared in the series entitled Brothers and Sisters as Elder Gittens' widow. Baden-Semper is also the cousin of American jazz, funk and soul music producer and artist George Semper.

In 2005, Baden-Semper appeared as Mary Seacole at a bicentenary exhibition at the Florence Nightingale Museum.

== Awards and honours ==
Baden-Semper has been the recipient of Joint Television Award and also Outstanding Female Personality, and was the subject of the ITV programme This Is Your Life on 12 March 1975. She was also given the Scarlet Ibis Award by the Trinidad and Tobago High Commission in London for meritorious service.

== Filmography ==
Film

- Carry On Up the Jungle (1970) – Girl Nosha (uncredited)
- Kongi's Harvest (1970) – Segi
- The Love Ban (1973) – Skyline Waitress
- Love Thy Neighbour (1973) – Barbie Reynolds
- Rage (1999) – Godwin's mother

Television

- Six Shades of Black (1965) – Fatima
- Redcap (1966) – Nurse
- Public Eye (1966) – Barmaid / Pearl
- The Corridor People (1966) – Pearl
- Intrigue (1966) – Nurse
- Rainbow City (1967) – Nurse
- The Wednesday Play (1968) – Ward nurse
- Mystery and Imagination (1968) – Vampire
- Counterstrike (1969) – Mrs. Sengupta
- Armchair Theatre (1970) – Annie Steffans
- Callan (1970) – Anna
- Confession (1970) – Waitress
- Take Three Girls (1970) – Claire
- The Persuaders! (1970) – Air Hostess
- Dear Mother...Love Albert (1970) – Ursula
- Thick as Thieves (1971)
- Love Thy Neighbour (1972–1976) – Barbie Reynolds
- Whodunnit? (1975) – Panellist
- Machinegunner (1976) – Felicity Rae Ingram
- George and Mildred (1979) – Sister
- The Bill (1988) – Mrs. Leigh
- Children's Ward (1989) – Jan Stevens
- Little Napoleons (1994) – Earnestina
- Crossroads (2002) – Rhona Martin
- Bernard's Watch (2004) – Bami (Last appearance)
