= Love Thy Neighbour (1972 TV series) =

British TV sitcom (1972–1976)

- Title card from the pilot for Love Thy Neighbour
- Created by: Vince Powell; Harry Driver
- Starring: Jack Smethurst; Rudolph Walker; Nina Baden-Semper; Kate Williams
- Country of origin: United Kingdom
- Original language: English
- No. of series: 8
- No. of episodes: 53 (list of episodes)

Production
- Running time: 25 minutes
- Production company: Thames Television

Original release
- Network: ITV
- Release: 13 April 1972 – 22 January 1976

Love Thy Neighbour is a British television sitcom that was broadcast from 13 April 1972 until 22 January 1976. The show spanned eight series, lasted for 53 episodes (plus an unaired pilot) and was produced by Thames Television for the ITV network.

The principal cast consists of Jack Smethurst, Rudolph Walker, Nina Baden-Semper, and Kate Williams. In 1973, the series was adapted into a film of the same name, and a later sequel series was set in Australia.

== Synopsis ==
The series was created and largely written by Vince Powell and Harry Driver; it was based around a white working class couple (Eddie and Joan Booth) living in Twickenham, in the outer London suburbs, and a black couple (Bill and Barbie Reynolds) as their next-door neighbours. One of the leads, Rudolph Walker, who played Bill Reynolds, wrote in an article for The Guardian in 2001 that the show is about "a black guy and a white guy being damned stupid".

== Cast and characters ==
- Eddie Booth (Jack Smethurst) is a white socialist. His world is turned upside down when Bill and Barbie Reynolds, who are black, move in next door. Eddie is even more annoyed when Bill gets a job at the same factory as him, and refers to him as a "nig-nog", "Sambo", "choc-ice" and "King Kong" among other things. He also has a tendency to call Chinese, Pakistanis or Indians names like "Fu Manchu", "Gunga Din" and "Ali Baba". He repeatedly insinuates that all blacks (and Bill in particular) are cannibals, and claims that "white always takes precedence over black". He is temporarily promoted to foreman in the episode "Clarky Leaves", but ends up being demoted after Bill complains he is running the factory like a forced labour camp; afterward, Bill gets the foreman's job. Eddie is a supporter of Manchester United. Notwithstanding his seeming contempt for Bill, the reality is that they drink together and are friends. Eddie's catchphrases include "Bloody Nora!", "Knickers!", "The subject is closed", "You bloody nig-nog!" and "Get knotted!"
- Joan Booth (Kate Williams) is Eddie's wife. She does not share her bigoted husband's opinion of their black neighbours and is good friends with Barbie. She often responds to Eddie's complaints with a sarcastic remark. Her catchphrases include "Don't be ridiculous!", "Don't talk rubbish!", and "May God forgive ya", which she normally says in response to Eddie denying his bigoted ways. She and Barbie both become pregnant at the end of Series 3; Joan later gives birth to a son, Mark.
- Bill Reynolds (Rudolph Walker) is a West Indian and a Conservative. He is a supporter of West Ham United. Whenever Eddie tries to outdo him, Bill usually ends up having the last laugh and rarely gets his comeuppance. He tends to have a very short temper, especially where Eddie is concerned, and has threatened him with a clenched fist several times. Although sophisticated and educated compared to Eddie, Bill is also stubborn and more than capable of using insulting phrases; he occasionally refers to Eddie as a "white honky" and "snowflake", and does not like catching Eddie staring at his wife. He also has a very high-pitched laugh. Bill is promoted to foreman at the end of the episode "Clarky Leaves". His catchphrases include "Hey, honky!", "Cobblers!" and "You talking to me, snowflake?".
- Barbie Reynolds (Nina Baden-Semper) is Bill's wife. Barbie and her next-door neighbour, Joan Booth, instantly strike up a friendship that carries on throughout the series, and the two women are often seen drinking tea or eating or getting caught up in their antagonistic husbands' latest row. Eddie is sometimes fascinated by her, as in the pilot episode when she bends over while wearing hotpants. She and Joan both become pregnant at the end of Series 3; Barbie gives birth to a son, Terry. Unlike other characters, she does not have any catchphrases.
- Jacko Robinson (Keith Marsh) is a socialist who works with Bill and Eddie. His catchphrase is "I'll have (a) half" (referring to a half-pint of bitter). He is not very bright, and often deviates from discussions between Eddie, Bill and Arthur.
- Arthur Thomas (Tommy Godfrey) is another of Eddie and Bill's socialist co-workers at the factory, and is often seen in the local pub playing cards and talking about trade union issues. Arthur, like Joan, is also more tolerant of Bill than Eddie is. He is a supporter of Arsenal.
- Nobby Garside (Paul Luty) is the barman of the social club from series 4 onwards. Initially hostile towards Eddie, they gradually sort out their differences as the series goes on. He is a supporter of Leeds United.

== Production ==
=== Filming locations ===
Exterior shots of the Reynolds and Booth residences for the unaired pilot episode were filmed at 90 and 92 The Alders, Hanworth, TW13 6NY. Series exteriors were filmed at 102 and 104 Bushy Park Road, Teddington, TW11 9DL. Interiors were filmed at the nearby Thames Television studios at Teddington.

=== Theme music ===
The theme song, "Love Thy Neighbour", was composed by Mack Gordon and Harry Revel and sung by Stuart Gillies. It was first published and recorded in 1934 (using the American spelling, "Love Thy Neighbor"), when Bing Crosby performed it in the musical comedy film We're Not Dressing.

== Reception ==
Ever since Love Thy Neighbour was first transmitted in 1972, it has been criticised for its poor handling of issues of racism. It was made in an era when Britain was struggling to come to terms with mass immigration, and Love Thy Neighbour was said to exemplify those difficulties. According to writer Sarita Malik, this meant "comedies about race" were really about "blacks signifying trouble" so that consequently "if the White characters did display prejudice, this was deemed funny or understandable given the 'difficulty of the situation'."

Its writers stated that each episode included both anti-white and anti-black sentiment. In Malik's opinion, in this "mutual racism", racist attitudes were "shown as a reciprocal, inevitable and petty process" rather than being faced with any challenge. As a result, academic Nora Plesske maintains that the premise continued without any change in attitudes or permanent resolution of the conflict.

The views of the main white male character (Eddie Booth, played by Jack Smethurst) were presented so as to make him appear ignorant and bigoted and were contrasted with the more tolerant attitude of his wife. "In nearly every show, the white neighbour was shown to be wrong", Rudolph Walker wrote in 2001. A contemporary reviewer in the Daily Mirror, Mary Malone, believed "the only characters who leave the screen with their dignity intact are the blacks. Now that's what I call prejudice."

The main male black character (Bill Reynolds, played by Walker) was better educated, although also stubborn and capable of using insulting phrases, such as the terms "Honky", "Snowflake", "Paleface" or "Big White Chief" to describe his white neighbour (often in response to being called "nig-nog" or "Sambo"). The comedy invariably fixated on the "Blackness" of Bill and Barbie or rather, as Malik expressed it, "television's interpretation of Blackness (limbo-dancing, voodoo/Black magic)." Other black stereotypes, such as regular references to cannibalism from the first episode onwards, became a running joke.

It has sometimes been considered that Love Thy Neighbour was an attempt by ITV (with inferior writing) to capitalise on the success of the BBC's Till Death Us Do Part (by Johnny Speight), also the source of great controversy for many of the same reasons. Repeats of Love Thy Neighbour have not been seen on British terrestrial television for many years. Rudolph Walker, who defends the series, regrets the programme's reputation in a "very politically correct climate" and asked in 2003 why "We can't take the piss out of each other and laugh". While Love Thy Neighbour was hugely popular at the time of its broadcast, its commissioner at Thames Television, head of light entertainment Philip Jones, acknowledged in 1972 that it received poor reviews.

The series has since been repeated on satellite television stations in the UK, although each episode begins with a warning about content. In 2003, DVDs of the series were reported to be selling well in Nigeria, parts of the Caribbean and Australia.

== Remakes ==
An Australian spin-off series, also called Love Thy Neighbour, was made in 1979, three years after the British series ended. Consisting of seven episodes, the series saw the character Eddie Booth transplanted to the Sydney suburb of Blacktown. The explanation given for the absence of Eddie's wife and child is Eddie has emigrated first and the family will join him after he has established himself. In this series, Eddie is a boarder with a married couple, Joyce (played by Sue Jones) and Bernard (Robert Hughes). Eddie's supervisor in his new job, Jim (Russell Newman), is also his neighbour. While the two men are initially hostile to each other, by episode three ('A Night to Remember') they are, essentially, friends. The series does not depict any racial tension, although Eddie remains typically pigheaded and prone to tirades about the racial superiority of the British.

An American version of the show, set in the suburbs of Los Angeles and titled Love Thy Neighbor, ran during the summer of 1973 on the American Broadcasting Company (ABC) television network. This toned-down version of the British original ran for one series of 12 episodes.

== Other appearance ==
Smethurst and Walker appeared as relaxing actors having a drink together in the studio bar when George Roper (Brian Murphy) walks in while searching the Thames Television TV studios in the 1974 film Man About the House.

== DVD releases ==
Until 2016, the series' DVD releases had been somewhat muddled. The earlier releases were superseded by the Love Thy Neighbour: The Complete Series nine-DVD box set from the Network imprint. It includes the unscreened pilot episode, all eight series in their intended running order, the Christmas 1972 short sketch for All Star Comedy Carnival, the 1973 New Year Special, and a new transfer of the 1973 feature film in its theatrical aspect ratio. It coincided with a standalone release of the feature film on Blu-ray.

Series 1–4 were originally released by Pegasus Entertainment, and Series 5–8 were released by FremantleMedia. Once Fremantle realised the issues with the DVD, it decided to completely release all the series in the correct order. The film has been released by Studiocanal. The following list shows the previous two sets of DVD releases:

=== Pegasus DVDs (no longer available) ===
- Unbroadcast pilot episode and all 7 episodes from Series 1
- All 6 episodes from Series 2 and first 4 episodes from Series 3
- Final 2 episodes from Series 3 and all episodes from Series 4

=== Fremantle ===
- Unbroadcast pilot episode – Series 1
- Episodes 1–7 – Series 1
- Episodes 8–13 – Series 2
- Episodes 14–19 – Series 3
- Episodes 20–27 – Series 4
- Episodes 28–33 – Series 5
- Episodes 34–40 – Series 6
- Episodes 41–46 – Series 7
- Episodes 47–53 – Series 8
- Episodes 1–53 – complete series

The often quoted missing 'April Fool' episode does not actually exist. During the 1974 run of the show it was postponed one week which led to it running longer than intended and receiving billing in TV Times for more weeks than it should. The episode "Bananas" was delayed, and "Eddie's Birthday", scheduled to be broadcast on 25 February, was not actually broadcast until 4 March. "Bananas" was then added onto the end of the series on 1 April, for which TV Times added an April Fool reference to the description that appeared for the earlier screening. So the April Fools episode is actually "Bananas" which is included in the DVD set. "The Coach Trip" was due to be aired with series 7, but for unknown reasons was not broadcast. It later appeared as part of series 8, with the new title "The Coach Outing to Bournemouth".

The DVDs list eight series, which is now known to be accurate when Network checked through the original scripts whilst compiling the complete series DVD set. Series 4 is the pregnancy story arc, and contains the final episodes written together by creators Vince Powell and Harry Driver. Series 5 continued to be broadcast straight after series 4, following the illness and subsequent death of co-creator Harry Driver, and as such was solely written by Powell.

After the initial broadcast of "The Big Day" (Series 4), in which Jack Smethurst plays the new baby as well as himself, there was an extra film of Nina Baden-Semper and Kate Williams with their real newborn babies (the reason for the pregnancy theme of the series). This extra bit was not on the Pegasus DVD, but is on the Network DVD of Series 4.

== See also ==
- List of films based on British sitcoms
- BFI.org
