= William B. Branch =

American playwright (1927–2019)

- Born: September 11, 1927; New Haven, Connecticut, U.S.
- Died: November 3, 2019 (aged 92); Hawthorne, New York, U.S.
- Education: Northwestern University; Columbia University (M.F.A.)
- Occupation: Playwright

William Blackwell Branch (September 11, 1927 – November 3, 2019) was an American playwright who was also involved in many aspects of entertainment, including journalism, media production, editing, a short-lived career acting for television as well as talking on the radio. He "wrote, directed, and produced extensively for the stage, television, radio, and his own media consulting and production firm".

== Early life and education ==
Branch was born on September 11, 1927, to James Matthew Branch, an African Methodist Episcopal Zion minister, and Iola Douglas Branch, in New Haven, Connecticut.

Branch attended high schools in Charlotte, North Carolina, and Washington, D.C. He went on to earn his undergraduate degree in Science at Northwestern University in 1949, then continued his education at Columbia University, graduating with his M.F.A. in dramatic arts in 1958. Branch later studied at Yale University, after which he taught at Cornell University and William Paterson College from 1994 to 1996, before beginning a career in entertainment, focusing specifically on drama.

== Career and themes ==
Branch involved himself in the entertainment world because he "became convinced that only African Americans could truthfully write and produce theater about African Americans." His first play was A Medal for Willie, written when he was 27. It launched Branch's career, leading to success and much recognition for his work. His writing characteristically "deals with the place and recognition of the African American in pre-civil rights America." He pointed out how American society was flawed in its treatment African Americans, and "the irony of the black soldier fighting for the freedom of others in another country and yet being denied those same basic freedoms and rights in his own country." Branch also highlighted racial stereotypes, allowing audiences to see the lies behind the stereotypes about African Americans.

Other issues featured in his work include feminism and familial relations. His play Baccalaureate: Drama in Three Acts is about a young African-American female in a middle-class family, discussing the struggles she faces when it came to education. Through his plays, such as In Splendid Error (1954) which tells in part the story of Frederick Douglass and his relationship with John Brown, A Wreath for Udomo (1961), Fifty Steps Toward Freedom (1970), and A Medal for Willie (1985), Branch explored and demonstrated societal problems in the unfair treatment of African Americans. He explained through these plays how wrongly African Americans were represented and the struggles they had within the middle class.

After beginning his career as a playwright, Branch went on to become involved in films. In 1968 he produced Still a Brother: Inside the Negro Middle Class in 1968, which touched on similar themes as those in his plays. Due to Branch's beliefs in African-American culture and who he thought was suitable to truthfully produce and project this culture to the public, he began to write and direct films to display his culture in a truthful manner. Branch remained a playwright following World War II, creating pieces that were seen as dramas.

Branch believed in telling the truth of African-American culture, arguing that only African Americans can tell the stories of how they were treated or represented.

== Awards and recognition ==
Branch was awarded for several different areas of his work. Branch was awarded the Guggenheim Fellowship grant for playwriting. Along with this award Branch received "a Robert E. Sherwood Television Award; and a citation from the National Conference of Christians and Jews (NCCJ)-the latter two are for his NBC television drama Light in the Southern Sky… Other honors included an American Film Festival Blue Ribbon Award and an Emmy nomination shared with fellow producer William Greaves for the PBS documentary film Still a Brother: Inside the Negro Middle Class and an NCCJ Citation for his PBS drama A Letter from Booker T…. Although Branch received awards and nominations he was noted for much of his other work, discussing racial, societal, and class issues as well as other topics that were not awarded or nominated.

== Selected work ==
=== Plays ===
- A Medal for Willie, 1951.
- In Splendid Error, 1954.
- Light in the Southern Sky, 1958.
- To Follow the Phoenix, 1960.
- A Wreath for Udomo, 1961.
- Baccalaureate, 1975.

=== Television writing ===
- This Way, ABC, 1955
- What Is Conscience?, CBS, 1955
- Let's Find Out, National Council of Church, 1956
- Light in the Southern Sky, NBC, 1958
- Legacy of a Prophet, Educational Broadcasting Corp., 1959
- The City (documentary series), Educational Broadcasting Corp., 1962–64
- Still a Brother: Inside the Negro Middle Class, NET, 1968
- The Case of NON-Working Workers, NBC, 1972
- The 20 Billion-Dollar-Rip-Off, NBC, 1972
- No Room to Run, No Place to Hide, NBC, 1972
- The Black Church in New York, NBC, 1973.
- Afro-American Perspectives (series), PBS, 1973–74.
- A Letter from Booker T., PBS, 1987.

=== Films ===
- Fifty Steps Toward Freedom, 1959.
- The Man on the Meeting Street, 1960.
- Benefit Performance, 1969.
- Judgement!, 1969.
- Together for Days, 1971.

=== Producer ===
- "NBC News," NBC, 1959–60.
- The City (documentary series), Educational Broadcasting Corp., 1962–64
- Still a Brother: Inside the Negro Middle Class, 1968
- Black Perspectives on the News, PBS, 1978–79 (Executive Producer)

=== Editor ===
- Black Thunder: An Anthology of Contemporary African American Drama, Mentor, 1992.
- Crosswinds: An Anthology of Black Dramatists in the Diaspora. Indiana University Press. 1993. ISBN 978-0-253-20778-4. "William B. Branch doollee."

=== Criticism ===
- "Man, Star, and Negro". The Crisis. December 1965.

=== Anthologies ===
- Black Theatre: A 20th Century Collection of the Work of Its Best Playwrights, edited by Lindsey Patterson, Dodd-Mead, 1971
- Woodie King, ed. (1972). Black Drama Anthology. Photographer Ron Milner. Columbia University Press. ISBN 978-0-451-04852-3. (reissue New American Library, 1986, ISBN 978-0-452-00902-8)
- Black Theatre USA: 45 Plays by Black Americans, 1847-1974, edited by J. Hatch, Free Press, 1974
- Standing Room Only, edited by Daigon and Bernier, Prentice-Hall, 1977
- Meeting Challenges, edited by J. Nelson, American Book, 1980
- Errol Hill, ed. (May 1, 2000). Black Heroes, Seven Plays. Applause Books. ISBN 978-1-55783-027-2.

=== Books ===
- (Editor and contributor) Black Thunder: An Anthology of Contemporary African American Drama, Mentor, 1992.
- (Editor and contributor) Crosswinds: An Anthology of Black Dramatists in the Diaspora, Indiana University Press, 1993.
