= Peter Abrahams =

South African novelist, journalist and political commentator (1919–2017)

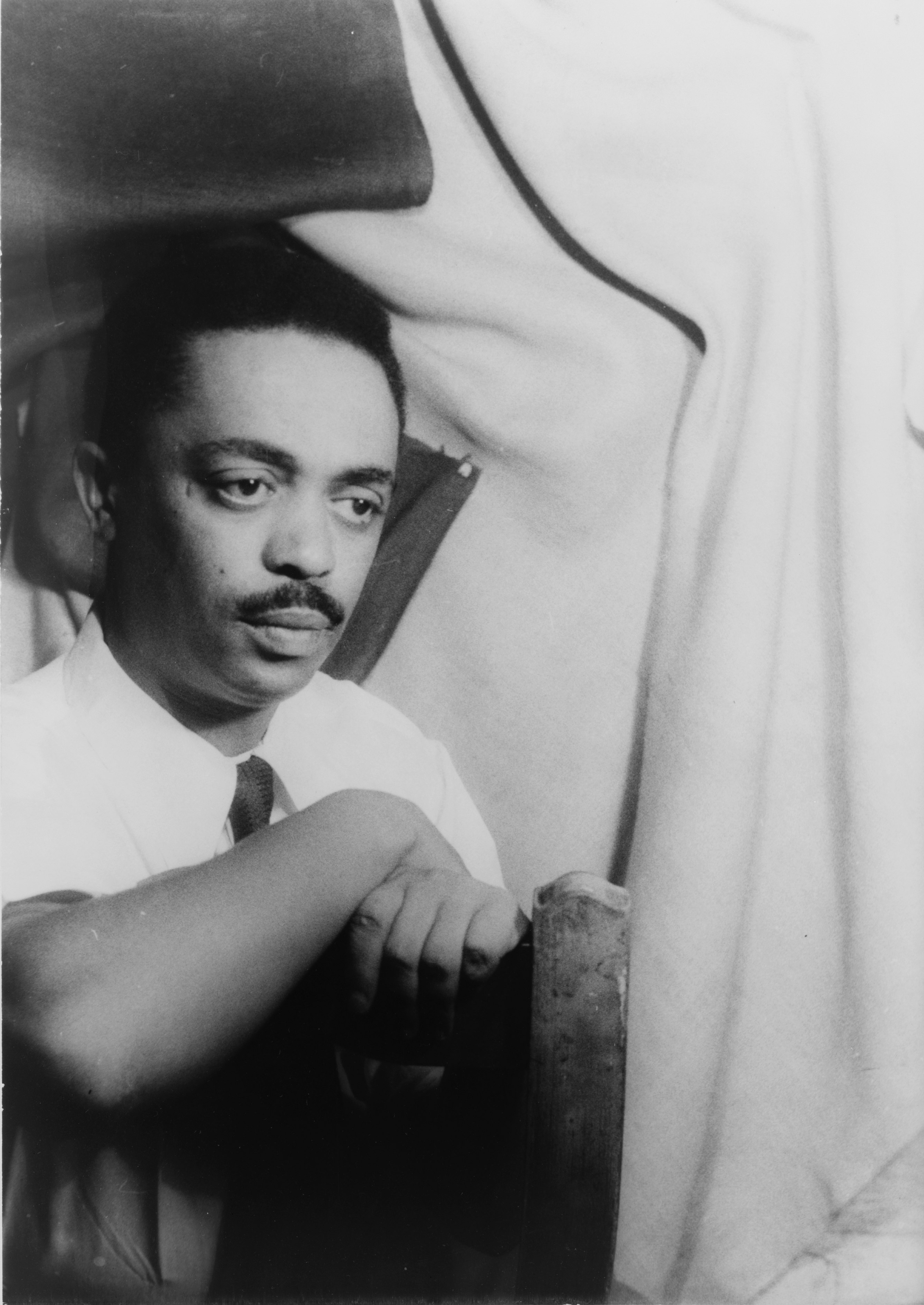
- Photo of Abrahams by Carl Van Vechten, 1955
- Born: Peter Henry Abrahams Deras; 3 March 1919; Vrededorp, Transvaal, Union of South Africa
- Died: 18 January 2017 (aged 97); Saint Andrew Parish, Jamaica
- Occupations: Novelist, journalist, political commentator
- Writing career
- Notable works: Mine Boy (1946); Tell Freedom (1954); A Wreath for Udomo (1956)

Peter Henry Abrahams Deras (3 March 1919 – 18 January 2017), commonly known as Peter Abrahams, was a South African-born novelist, journalist and political commentator who in 1956 settled in Jamaica, where he lived for the rest of his life. His death at the age of 97 is considered to have been murder.

== Biography ==
=== Early years and education ===
Abrahams was born in 1919 in Vrededorp, a suburb of Johannesburg, South Africa; his father was from Ethiopia and his mother was Coloured, with French and African roots. Abrahams was five years old when his father died, and with his family thereafter struggling financially his mother sent him to live with relatives until the age of 11, when he became a boarding student at the Anglican Church's Grace Dieu School in Pietersburg. On graduation from there, he went to St Peter's Secondary School in Rosettenville, paying his tuition fees by working at the Bantu Men's Social Centre.

=== Move to London (1939) and Jamaica (1956) ===
In 1939, Abrahams left South Africa, and worked first as a sailor, and then settled in London, where he was a journalist. While working in London, Abrahams lived with his wife Daphne in Loughton, whilst meeting several important black leaders and writers.

Hoping to make his way as a writer, he faced considerable challenges as a South African, as Carol Polsgrove has shown in her history, Ending British Rule: Writers in a Common Cause (2009). Despite a manuscript reader's recommendation against publication, in 1942 Allen & Unwin brought out his Dark Testament, made up mostly of pieces he had carried with him from South Africa. Publisher Dorothy Crisp published his novels Song of the City (1945) and Mine Boy (1946). According to Nigerian scholar Kolawole Ogungbesan, Mine Boy became "the first African novel written in English to attract international attention." More books followed with publication in Britain and the United States: two novels —The Path of Thunder (1948) and Wild Conquest (1950); a journalistic account of a return journey to Africa, Return to Goli (1953); and a memoir, Tell Freedom (1954).

In 1945, Abrahams helped to organised the fifth Pan-African Congress which took place in Manchester and is today regarded as a turning point within the independence struggle. In attendance at the event were names like Kwame Nkrumah, Hastings Banda, Jomo Kenyatta and W. E. B. Du Bois. In 1956, Abrahams published a roman à clef about the political community of which he had been a part in London: A Wreath for Udomo. His main character, Michael Udomo, who returns from London to his African country to preside over its transformation into an independent, industrial nation, appeared to be modelled chiefly on Nkrumah with a hint of Kenyatta. Other identifiable fictionalized figures included George Padmore. The novel concluded with Udomo's murder. Published the year before Nkrumah took the reins of independent Ghana, A Wreath for Udomo was not an optimistic forecast of Africa's future.

Abrahams is commemorated by a blue plaque on his former council house in Jessel Drive in Loughton, London installed in 2020.

In 1956, Abrahams settled in Jamaica, where he continued novels and memoirs, also working as a journalist and radio commentator. In 1994 he was awarded the Musgrave Gold Medal for his writing and journalism by the Institute of Jamaica.

=== Death ===
Abrahams was found dead at his home in Saint Andrew Parish, Jamaica, on 18 January 2017, aged 97. A forensic examination showed that Abrahams was a victim of foul play. A local 61-year-old man, Norman Tomlinson, was later charged with murder. Court proceedings began in March 2017 after a delay due to a lengthy power outage in the court house; and on 7 October 2018, having pleaded guilty to manslaughter, Tomlinson was jailed for seven years.

== Writing ==
Peter Abrahams was one of South Africa's most prominent writers, his works dealing with political and social issues, especially with racism. His novel Mine Boy (1946), one of the first works to bring him to critical attention, and his memoir Tell Freedom (1954) deal in part with apartheid. His other works include the story collection Dark Testament (1942) and the novels The Path of Thunder (1948, which inspired both a ballet of the same name and the opera Reiter der Nacht by Ernst Hermann Meyer), A Wreath for Udomo (1956), A Night of Their Own (1965), the Jamaica-set This Island Now (1966, the only one of his novels not set in Africa) and The View from Coyaba (1985). His memoir The Coyaba Chronicles was published in 2000.

== Works ==
- Dark Testament (1942)
- Song of the City (1943), novel, published by Dorothy Crisp & Co Ltd London
- Mine Boy (1946), published by Dorothy Crisp & Co. The first author to bring South Africa's apartheid system to international attention.
- The Path of Thunder (1948),
- Wild Conquest (1950),
- Return to Goli (1953)
- Tell Freedom (1954; new edn 1970)
- A Wreath for Udomo (1956),
- Jamaica: an Island Mosaic (1957), Her Majesty's Stationery Office, the Corona Library
- A Night of Their Own (1965),
- This Island Now (1966),
- The View from Coyaba (1985),
- The Coyaba Chronicles: Reflections on the Black Experience in the 20th Century (2000)

== Music inspired by his works ==
- The ballet İldırımlı yollarla ("The Path of Thunder") (1958) by the Azerbaijani composer Gara Garayev
- the opera Reiter der Nacht (1973) by the East German composer Ernst Hermann Meyer is also based on The Path of Thunder
