= Ronan O'Casey =

Canadian actor and producer (1922–2012)

- Publicity Photo of Ronan O'Casey
- Born: August 18, 1922; Montreal, Quebec, Canada
- Died: April 12, 2012 (aged 89); Los Angeles, California, US
- Occupations: Actor, producer
- Years active: 1948–1993
- Spouse: Louie Ramsay (m. 1956; div. 1979) Carol Tavris (m. 1980)

Ronan O'Casey (18 August 1922 – 12 April 2012) was a Canadian actor and film producer, who worked principally in the United Kingdom and later the United States.

== Early life ==
O'Casey was born in Montreal, Quebec to immigrant parents from Ireland. His father, Michael Casey, was a poet. His mother, actress Margaret Sheehy Culhane, was a Dubliner who had had co-starred with the young James Joyce in his first stage role.

At the age of eight, O'Casey began acting in his mother's Montreal theatre company and, after tours in theatre and vaudeville, he moved to Dublin and then to London.

== Career ==
O'Casey found early success in post-war films such as The Mudlark (1950), Talk of a Million (1951) and Norman Wisdom's Trouble in Store (1953), going on to play the prisoner of Room 101 in 1984 and the sergeant in Nicholas Ray's war film Bitter Victory (1957). While starring in the West End play Detective Story he met actress and singer Louie Ramsay, whom he married in 1956.

O'Casey's comedy talents brought him his best known role, as Jeff Rogers, Canadian son-in-law of Peggy Mount, in the TV sitcom The Larkins (1958–64). He was host of ITV's charades gameshow Don't Say a Word (1963), a panel game with two teams led by Libby Morris and Kenneth Connor. and co-host of Rediffusion's Sing A Song of Sixpence show. In 1966 he was cast as Vanessa Redgrave's lover, the "blow-up" of Antonioni's Blow-Up (1966). In 1976, he wrote, produced and starred in (in a non-sexual role) the adult film The Double Exposure of Holly., directed by artist Bob Gill.

O'Casey also appeared on stage, in plays such as Forever April at the Nottingham Playhouse, in which he co-starred with Kenneth Connor in 1966. and Eugene O'Neill's Desire Under the Elms at London's Embassy Theatre in 1955.

As literary head of the production company Commonwealth United, O'Casey was an associate producer on Terry Southern's The Magic Christian (1969) with Ringo Starr, Peter Sellers and a soundtrack by Badfinger. After moving to the United States in 1980, he had roles in many US television shows, including L.A. Law, Easy Street, Falcon Crest and Dallas and Santa Barbara. In later years, he wrote and staged a one-man play in Los Angeles on the poetry of Yeats.

== Personal life ==
O'Casey married actress Louie Ramsay in 1956, with whom he had a son, Matt. They divorced in 1979, and O'Casey and, after moving to the United States in 1980, he married the writer Carol Tavris.

O'Casey was at one time a leading ice hockey player in his native Montreal, skills which he was able to put to use during the filming of children's adventure serial The New Forest Rustlers, in which he played the leader of a gang planning to steal a priceless Rembrandt.

=== Death ===
O'Casey died in Los Angeles on April 12, 2012, aged 89.

== Partial stage credits ==
Year	Play	Role	Theatre	Ref.
1950	Detective Story	Warren Stanhope	Prince's Theatre	
1950	Louise		The Q	
1951	Kiss Me Kate	Ralph	New Theatre, Oxford; Coliseum, London	
1953	The Shrike	Don Gregory	Theatre Royal, Brighton	
1954	Queen of Hearts	Knave of Hearts	Bournemouth Ice Rink	
1955	Desire Under the Elms	Simeon	Embassy Theatre	
1957	The Kidders	Steve Bucknell	Arts Theatre	
1964	The First Fish		Savoy	
1965	Harvey		Palace Theatre, Southend	
1965	The Rivals	Sir Lucius	Theatre Royal, Windsor	
1970	They Shoot Actors, Don't They?	EQUITY Charity Event	Roundhouse, London	

== Filmography ==
=== Film ===
Year	Title	Role	Notes	Ref.
1949	Give Us This Day	Bastian		
1950	The Mudlark	Slattery	Uncredited	
1951	Talk of a Million	Derry Murnahan		
1953	Three Steps to the Gallows	Crawson		
1953	Top of the Form	Brother		
1953	Trouble in Store	Eddie		
1953	Escape by Night	Pietro		
1954	Double Exposure	Trickson		
1954	Happy Ever After	Reporter		
1954	Tiger by the Tail	Nick		
1955	The Gilded Cage	Charles Liddell		
1955	Barbados Quest	Stefan Gordoni		
1956	1984	Rutherford		
1956	Reach For the Sky	Canadian Pilot / Coltishall II	Uncredited	
1956	Satellite in the Sky	Reporter		
1956	The Big Money	Gang Member	Uncredited	
1957	Bitter Victory	Sergeant Dunnigan		
1958	Blind Spot	Rushford		
1960	Inn For Trouble	Jeff Roberts		
1965	Darling	Party Guest	Uncredited	
1966	Blowup	Jane's Lover	Uncredited	
1968	The Magic Christian	—N/a	Associate producer	
1971	The Night Digger	—N/a	Development executive	
1971	Freelance	—N/a	Executive producer	
1974	Feelings	John Roberts		
1976	The Double Exposure of Holly	Lee	Also writer and producer	
1985	The Protector	NYPD Commissioner		
1993	The Beverly Hillbillies	Man at Party		

=== Television ===
Year	Title	Role	Notes	Ref.
1947	The Man Who Came To Dinner	Richard Stanley	TV movie	
1947	Rotten Row	Captain Collins	TV movie	
1947	The Soul of Anthony Nero	Jimmy	TV movie	
1948	Death at Newtonstewart	Moncrieff	TV movie	
1948	The Monkey's Paw	Herbert Wright	TV Short	
1948	The Front Page	Besinger	TV movie	
1954	Willie the Squouse	Richard	TV movie	
1954-56	The Vise	Archie / Thompson / Paul / Dillon	4 episodes	
1955	BBC Sunday Night Theatre	McAllister	Episode: "The Voices"	
1956-57	The Trollenberg Terror	Albert	6 episodes	
1956-58	ITV Play of the Week	Frank Lubey / Glenn / Private O'Hara / Philip Gadney	4 episodes	
1957	The Buccaneers	Understandable Perkins	Episode: "Indian Fighters"	
1958	Alf's Button		TV movie	
1958-59	Armchair Theatre	Slim Murray, William R. Rush	3 episodes	
1958-63	The Larkins	Jeff Rogers	27 episodes	
1959-60	The Four Just Men	Dexter, Joe	2 episodes	
1960	BBC Sunday-Night Play	Hannify	Episode: "A Town Has Turned to Dust"	
1961	Danger Man	Pilot	Episode: "The Island"	
1966	The New Forest Rustlers	The Chief	6 episodes	
1980-81	Ryan's Hope	Chip Willard	2 episodes	
1986	The A-Team	Ambassador Moo	Episode: "The Spy Who Mugged Me"	
1986	L.A. Law	Gregory Northrop	Episode: "Sidney, the Dead-Nosed Reindeer"	
1986, 1989	Santa Barbara	Psychiatrist, Bishop	10 episodes	
1987	Shell Game	Nathan Thayer	Episode: "Norman's Parking Ticket"	
1987	Easy Street	Ross Chamberlain	Episode: "The Country Club"	
1987	Sledge Hammer!	Milo Tieup	Episode: "Sledge in Toyland"	
1987, 1989	Falcon Crest	Ambassador, Elroy Higgins	2 episodes	
