= Joe Melia =

British actor (1935– 2012)

- Born: Giovanni Philip William Melia; 23 January 1935; Camden Town, London, England
- Died: October 20, 2012 (aged 77); Stratford-upon-Avon, Warwickshire, England
- Education: City of Leicester Boys' Grammar School; Downing College, Cambridge
- Occupation: Actor

Giovanni Philip William "Joe" Melia (23 January 1935, Camden, London – 20 October 2012, Stratford-upon-Avon, Warwickshire) was a British actor known for his work on stage, in films and on television. He first came to notice in Peter Nichols's play A Day in the Death of Joe Egg (Glasgow Citizens, 1967).

== Biography ==
Born in Camden, north London, to immigrant Italian parents who had moved to Leicester during the Second World War, Melia was educated at the City of Leicester Boys' Grammar School, and Downing College, Cambridge, where he read English,

== Selected filmography ==
=== Film ===
Year	Title	Role	Notes
1959	Too Many Crooks	Whisper	
1959	Follow a Star	Stage Manager	
1965	The Intelligence Men	Conductor	
1965	Four in the Morning	Friend	
1966	Modesty Blaise	Crevier	
1969	Oh! What a Lovely War	Photographer	
1969	A Talent for Loving	Tortillaw	
1972	Antony and Cleopatra	Messenger No. 1	
1976	Peter Pan	Starkey	TV Movie
1977	Sweeney!	Ronnie Brint	
1977	Leonardo's Last Supper	–	
1978	The Odd Job	Head Waiter	
1980	The Wildcats of St Trinian's	Flash Harry	
1980	Donkeys' Years	Kenneth	
1982	Privates on Parade	Sergeant Len Bonny	
1983	The Sign of Four	Jonathan Small	TV Movie
1984	Pop Pirates	Guard	
1984	Sakharov	Sergej Kovalov	TV Movie

=== Television ===
Year	Title	Role	Notes
1959	The Larkins	4th Barrister	Episode: "Haul for One"
1961	Winning Widows	–	1 episode
1965	Call It What You Like	Various	6 episodes
1965-6	Not Only... But Also	Various	2 episodes
1966	Foreign Affairs	Serge Volchanivov	6 episodes
1967	Man in a Suitcase	Hendrik Olsen	Episode: "The Sitting Pigeon"
1968	Softly, Softly	Lemgrace	Episode: "Proof"
1968	Sherlock Holmes	Joey Daly	Episode: "A Study in Scarlet"
1969	Public Eye	Billy Raybold	Episode: "The Comedian's Graveyard"
1969	The Mind of Mr. J.G. Reeder	Mo Linski	Episode: "The Green Mamba"
1971	Paul Temple	Alex Trimmer	Episode: "The Guilty Must Die"
1973	The Goodies	Builder, Estate Agent	Episode: "The New Office"
1976	Red Letter Day	Stanley	Amazing Stories
1979	Sally Ann	Bernie	2 episodes
1981	The Hitchhiker's Guide to the Galaxy	Mr. Prosser	1 episode
1982	Last of the Summer Wine	Percy	Episode: "A Bicycle Made For Three"
1983	Give Us a Break	Monty	Episode: "When It Rains, It Pours"
1984	Big Deal	Mel Carter	Episode: "A Ragged Run"
1985	Minder	Ernie	Episode: "From Fulham, with Love"
1986	Chance in a Million	Photographer	Episode: "Pre-Matrimonial Tensions"
1986-88	A Very Peculiar Practice	Ron Rust	3 episodes
1992	Birds of a Feather	Greek Priest	Episode: "Belongings"
1992	The Bill	Siddy Jacobs	Episode: "Open to Offers"
1994	Love on a Branch Line	Mr. Jones	4 episodes
1995	The Ghostbusters of East Finchley	Stan	5 episodes
1997	Born to Run	Albert	3 episodes (final appearance)
