= Derek Benfield =

British actor and playwright (1926–2009)

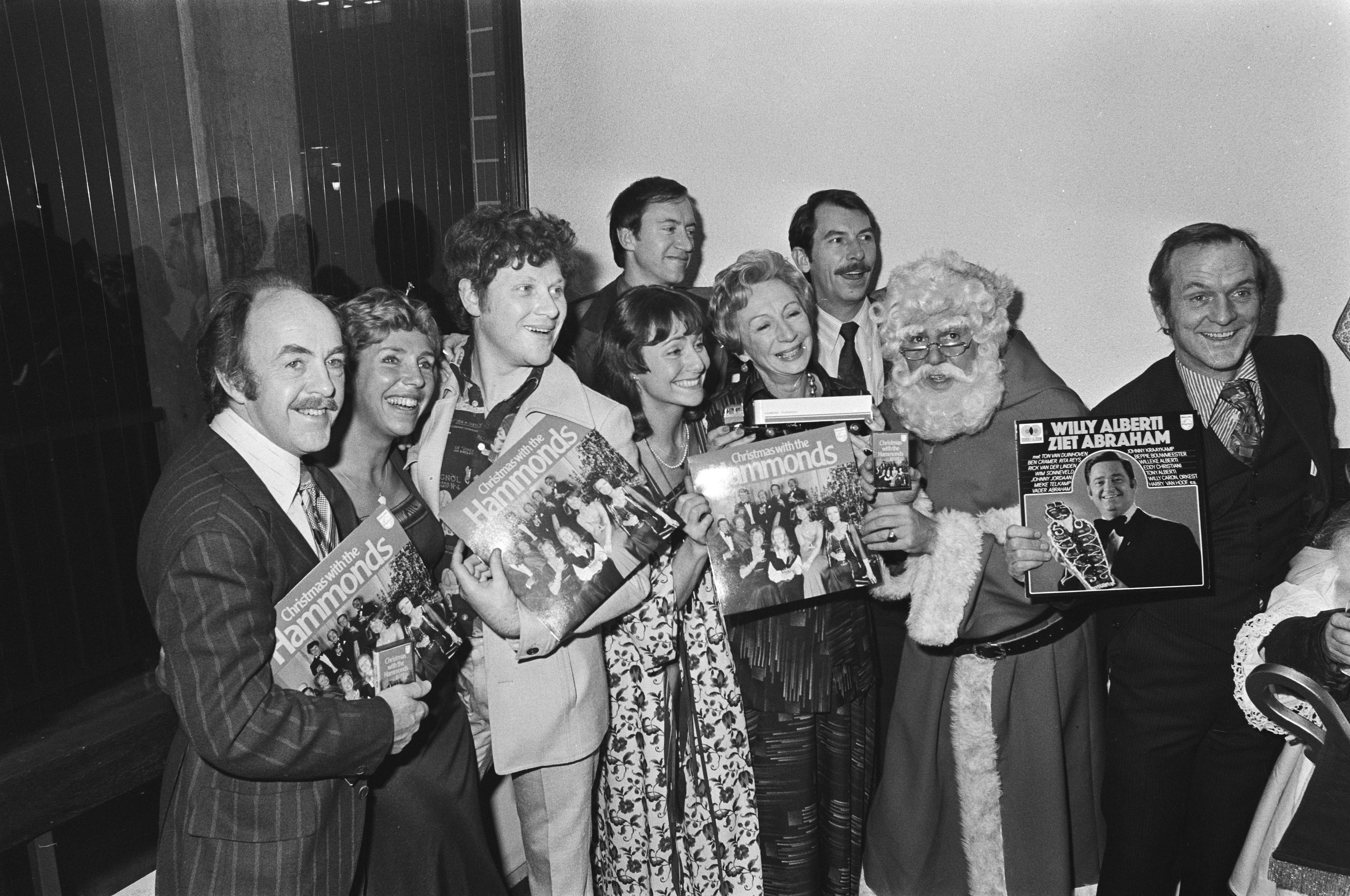
- Benfield (left) in 1976
- Born: Derek Benfield; 11 March 1926; Bradford, England
- Died: 10 March 2009 (aged 82); Esher, England
- Occupations: Playwright and Actor
- Years active: 1948–2005
- Spouse: Susan Lyall Grant (m. 1957)
- Children: 2

Derek Benfield (11 March 1926 – 10 March 2009) was a British playwright and actor.

He was born in Bradford, West Riding of Yorkshire, and educated at Bingley Grammar School. He was the author of the stage farce Running Riot and played Patricia Routledge's character's husband in Hetty Wainthropp Investigates (1996–1998).

Arguably, Benfield's best known character portrayal was as transport company foreman Bill Riley in the UK television series from the early 1970s, The Brothers. Before this, he starred as Frank Skinner in the 1970 cult sci-fi series broadcast on UK ITV, Timeslip. Some of his other television roles included Walter Greenhalgh in Coronation Street (1961–1969), Albert the Clerk in Rumpole of the Bailey (1978–80), and characters in Breakaway (1980) and First of the Summer Wine (1988).

His film credits include small roles in Crossplot (1969), I Don't Want to Be Born (1975) and Lifeforce (1985). His plays included the farces Post Horn Gallop and Wild Goose Chase, both about the fictional exploits of the eccentric Lord and Lady Elrood and visitors to their castle.

He also appeared with Colin Baker as John Hallam in the Doctor Who audio play Catch-1782 produced by Big Finish Productions.

== Plays ==
- The Young in Heart, 1953
- The Way the Wind Blows, 1954
- Champagne for Breakfast, 1954
- Wild Goose Chase, 1955
- Running Riot, 1958
- Out of Thin Air, 1961
- Fish out of Water, 1963
- Down to Brass Tacks, 1964
- Third Party Risk, 1964
- The Party, 1964
- Post Horn Gallop, 1965
- Murder for the Asking, 1967
- Off the Hook, 1970
- A Bird in the Hand, 1973
- Panic Stations, 1975
- Caught on the Hop, 1979
- Beyond a Joke, 1980
- In for the Kill, 1981
- Look Who's Talking, 1984
- Touch and Go, 1984
- Flying Feathers, 1987
- Bedside Manners, 1990
- Toe in the Water, 1991
- Don't Lose the Place, 1992
- Anyone for Breakfast?, 1994
- Up and Running, 1995
- A Fly in the Ointment, 1996
- Two and Two Together, 1999
- Second Time Around, 2000?
- Funny Business, 2005
- In at the Deep End, 2005
- Over My Dead Body, 2005?
- First Things First, 2007

== Personal life ==
Benfield was married to actress Susan Lyle Grant from 1953 until his death in 2009. Together, they had two children, Jamie Benfield and Kate Plantin. He also had two grandchildren.

== Death ==
Benfield died of stomach cancer on 10 March 2009 at the age of 82, on the day before his 83rd birthday.

== Filmography ==
=== Film ===
Year	Title	Role	Notes
1959	Room at the Top	Man in Bar	Uncredited
1962	A Matter of Conscience	Gerasimovich	TV film
1964	House of Glass	Sapper Maggs	TV film
1965	Jury Room	Unknown	
1969	Mosquito Squadron	Airman Valet	Uncredited
1969	Crossplot	Man in cafe	
1975	I Don't Want to Be Born	Police Inspector	
1975	Safety – Everyone's Business	Unknown	
1975	Safety in Shipbuilding	Unknown	
1977	The Bia Safety Set: Safety – Hearing	Unknown	
1977	The Bia Safety Set: Safety – Seeing	Unknown	
1977	The Bia Safety Set: Safety – Dermatits	Unknown	
1977	Safety Hearing	Unknown	
1978	Charlie and Julie	Uncle Charlie	
1979	One Last Shock	Unknown	
1979	The Knowledge	Football Driver	TV film
1980	The Boy Who Never Was	Inspector	TV film
1980	Any Fool Can Do It?	Unknown	
1980	AA – The Sign for Service	Unknown	
1982	Remembrance	Vincent's Father	
1984	Arthur's Hallowed Ground	Eric	TV film
1984	Slimming Down	Grandad	
1985	Lifeforce	Physician	
1986	FMI: Service Reception Service	Unknown	
1987	The Girl	Janitor	
1987	Our Geoff	Ronnie	TV film
1995	Missing Persons	Unknown	

=== Television ===
Year	Title	Role	Notes
1955	Return to the Lost Planet	Professor Bergman	3 episodes
1958	The Larkins	Mr. Burlington Thrush	Episode: "Angry Young Man"
1959	The Larkins	Third Barrister	Episode: "Haul for One"
1959	Great Expectations	Landlord	1 episode
1960	Suspense	Prison Doctor	Episode: "Decision at Nine"
1960	ITV Sunday Night Drama	Graves	Episode: "The Devil Makes Sunday"
1960	Probation Officer	George Cooper	1 episode
1961	Three Live Wires	Higgenbottom	All 26 episodes
1961	Maigret	Emile	Episode: "Death of a Butcher"
1962	Harpers West One	Cedric Gilbert	1 episode
1962	Winning Widows		Episode: "The Supermarket"
1962	Faces of Jim		Episode: "The Face of Tradition"
1962	ITV Play of the Week	Chancellor of the Exchequer	Episode: "The Apple Cart"
1963	ITV Play of the Week	Dr. Kusmich	Episode: "War and Peace"
1963	Z-Cars	Mr. Healey	Episode: "It Never Rains..."
1963	Crane	Osman	Episode: "The Cannabis Syndicate"
1963	Drama 61-67	Taxi Driver	Episode: "The Taxi's for Johnnie"
1963	The Victorians	Tubbs	Episode: "The Silver King"
1963	Marriage Lines	Harold	Episode: "The Threshold"
1963	ITV Playhouse	Barrett	Episode: "They Don't Make Summers Like They Used To"
1963	Sergeant Cork	Mr. Spiller	Episode: "The Case of the Fenian Men"
1963	Coronation Street	Jim Baker	3 episodes
1964	Dixon of Dock Green	Mr. Stevens	Episode: "All Sorts to Make a World"
1964	Z-Cars	Mr. Brooke	Episode: "Whistle and Come Home"
1964	Z-Cars	McKinley	Episode: "Finders Keepers"
1964	Detective	Dr. Hamm	Episode: "The Drawing"
1964	The Villains	Harry	Episode: "Contraband"
1964	Happily Ever After		1 episode
1964	The Protectors	Betts	Episode: "Who Killed Lazoryck?"
1964	Catch Hand	Baxter	Episode: "It's Only Bricks and Mortar"
1964	R3	Tom Collis	3 episodes
1964	No Hiding Place	Henry Mercer	Episode: "Scaremonger"
1965	No Hiding Place	Prescott	Episode: "Music for Murder"
1965	Story Parade	Mr. Laker	Episode: "The Make-Believe Man"
1965	Cluff	Josh Tupman	Episode: "The Brothers"
1965	Riviera Police	Voisin	Episode: "That Kind of Girl"
1965	Jury Room	Mr. Blakiston	Episode: "Traitor"
1965	Theatre 625	Sergeant Byrom	Episode: "The Siege of Manchester"
1965	The Mask of Janus	Andrew Parsons	3 episodes
1966	Dixon of Dock Green	Mr. Delaney	Episode: "The Heister"
1966	Dixon of Dock Green	Publican	Episode: "Street of Fear"
1966	The Baron	The Scientist	Episode: "The Persuaders"
1966	The Likely Lads	Cloakroom attendant	Episode: "Brief Encounter"
1966	Public Eye	Carter	Episode: "I Could Set It to Music"
1966	The Troubleshooters	Sloan	Episode: "Four Cheers for Geoffrey"
1966	Blackmail	Cully	Episode: "The Haunting of Aubrey Hopkiss"
1966	Vendetta	Police Sergeant	Episode: "The Ice-Cream Man"
1967	Z-Cars	Mr. Blacker	Episode: "The Great Fur Robbery"
1967	Dixon of Dock Green	Jack Bowden	Episode: "The Step-Brother"
1967	The Newcomers	Mr. Hutchinson	3 episodes
1967	The Gamblers	Fireman	Episode: "The Man Beneath"
1967	Coronation Street	Walter Greenhalgh	Recurring role
1967	Softly, Softly	Palmer	Episode: "The Same the Whole World Over"
1968	Softly, Softly	Moxham	Episode: "In Bulk"
1968	Z-Cars	Timmy Cater	Episode: "Special Relationship"
1968	The Revenue Men	Fender	Episode: "Sentimental Value"
1968	The First Lady	Mowbray	Episode: "Cleverclogs"
1968	Champion House	Gerald Dobson	Episode: "Breakout"
1968	The Expert	Harry Murdoch	Episode: "Full Choke"
1968	The Root of All Evil?	Peter Whittaker	Episode: "You Can Only Buy Once"
1969	Dixon of Dock Green	Harry Fisher	Episode: "The Jelly Man"
1969	Plays of Today	Purdon	Episode: "Men of Iron"
1969	Hadleigh	Sergeant Moggs	Episode: "Safety of the Realm"
1969	Paul Temple	Victor Burgess	Episode: "Message from a Dead Man"
1969	Out of the Unknown	Tom Clarke	Episode: "Immortality Inc"
1970	Oh, Brother!		Episode: "The Laughter of a Fool"
1970	Z-Cars	Dicky Green	Episode: "Cruising for Burglars"
1970	The Borderers	Herdsman	Episode: "Hostage"
1970–1971	Timeslip	Frank Skinner	Series regular
1971	Z-Cars	Thurley	Episode: "Dan Dan..."
1971	Dixon of Dock Green	Quilter	Episode: "Flashpoint"
1971	Out of the Unknown	Dr. Liam Moore	Episode: "Welcome Home"
1971	Thirty-Minute Theatre	Bradford	Episode: "Jenkins"
1971	Doomwatch	Arnold Payne	Episode: "Public Enemy"
1972	Doomwatch	Dr. Ridley	Episode: "Flood"
1972	Z-Cars	Byrne	Episode: "Sweet Girl"
1972	Man at the Top	Mr. Cunliffe	Episode: "All Very Hush, Hush"
1972	The Long Chase	Fisherman	3 episodes
1972–1976	The Brothers	Bill Riley	Series regular, 89 episodes
1973	The Flaxton Boys	Sergeant Brophy	3 episodes
1973	Armchair Theatre	Cyril	Episode: "The Death of Glory"
1975	Late Call	Voice #2	Mini-series
1975	Dixon of Dock Green	Skinner	Episode: "Chain of Events"
1976	Hunter's Walk	Bert Brown	Episode: "Say Nothing"
1978	Armchair Thriller	Mr. Cooper	Episode: "The Girl Who Walked Quickly"
1978	Z-Cars	Detective Superintendent Ramsden	Episode: "Departures"
1978–1980	Rumpole of the Bailey	Albert Handyside	Recurring role, 4 episodes
1979	Thundercloud	Beattie	Episode: "Carry on Number One"
1980	Breakaway	Leo Corby	3 episodes
1980	Minder	Brown	Episode: "A Lot of Bull and a Pat on the Back"
1980	In Loving Memory	Alfred Pardoe	Episode: "The Outing"
1981	Hi-de-Hi!	Rose's Dad	Episode: "Desire in the Mickey Mouse Grotto"
1981	Crown Court	Alfred Warrington	Episode: "Leonora"
1981	Wilfred and Eileen	Mr. Clough	1 episode
1982	A Kind of Loving	Franklyn	3 episodes
1982	Shine on Harvey Moon	Chairman	2 episodes
1982	Yes Minister	Aston Wanderers Board Member	Episode: "The Middle-Class Rip-Off"
1983	Hallelujah!	Arthur Walton	Episode: "Poor Box"
1984	Hallelujah!	Andrew Gibson	Episode: "Rock Bottom"
1984	Hammer House of Mystery and Suspense	Undertaker	Episode: "The Late Nancy Irving"
1984	The Gentle Touch	Mr. Devis	Episode: "Wise Child"
1984	Remington Steele	Hector Tolouse	Episode: "Maltese Steele"
1984	Juliet Bravo	Mr. Darcy	Episode: "Workforce"
1984–1985	The New Statesman	Mr. Walmsley	2 episodes
1985	Travellers by Night	Man in the forest	Mini-series
1986	Casualty	Mr. Davies	Episode: "Crazies"
1987	Worlds Beyond	Dr. Meredith	Episode: "The Black Thumb"
1987	Intimate Contact	Edgar	3 episodes
1988	Gentlemen and Players	Harry Griffen	Episode: "One for Sorrow, Two for Joy"
1988	Help!	Mr. Kinnell	Episode: "We Are Sailing"
1988–1989	First of the Summer Wine	Mr. Scrimshaw	Series regular, 13 episodes
1989	Only Fools and Horses	Registrar	Episode: "Little Problems"
1989	That's Love	Brian	1 episode
1990	Agatha Christie's Poirot	Dr. Adams	Episode: "The Cornish Mystery"
1990	Making News	Philip Baxter	Episode: "Conspiracy"
1990	Casualty	Eric Hogarth	Episode: "Street Life"
1992	Lovejoy	Don	Episode: "Angel Trousers"
1992	The Brittas Empire	Mr. Franklin	Episode: "New Generations"
1992	Screen One	Man on Bus	Episode: "Trust Me"
1993	Mulberry	Alf	Episode: "A Musical Evening"
1994	The Inspector Alleyn Mysteries	Alfred Belt	Episode: "Hand in Glove"
1994	Men of the World	Mr. Buxton	Episode: "Lost in France"
1996	Peak Practice	Fred Hargrave	Episode: "Whipping Boy"
1996–1998	Hetty Wainthropp Investigates	Robert Wainthropp	Series regular, 23 episodes
1997	Frighteners	Jack Hammond	Episode: "Rose Cottage"
2001	Hearts and Bones	Mike Piper	1 episode
2005	Doctor Who: The Monthly Adventures	John Hallam (voice)	1 episode
