= Ladies Who Do =

1964 British film by C. M. Pennington-Richards

- Theatrical release poster
- Directed by: C. M. Pennington-Richards
- Written by: Michael Pertwee; John Bignall
- Produced by: George H. Brown; Jan Darnley-Smith
- Starring: Peggy Mount; Robert Morley; Harry H. Corbett; Dandy Nichols
- Cinematography: Geoffrey Faithfull
- Edited by: Oswald Hafenrichter
- Music by: Ron Goodwin
- Production companies: Bryanston Films; Fanfare Films
- Distributed by: British Lion Films
- Release dates: 16 January 1964 (London); 25 November 1963 (NYC)
- Running time: 85 minutes
- Country: United Kingdom
- Language: English
- Budget: £134,666 or £116,997

Ladies Who Do is a 1963 British comedy film directed by C. M. Pennington-Richards and starring Peggy Mount, Robert Morley and Harry H. Corbett. It was written by Michael Pertwee and John Bignall.

== Plot ==
Mrs. Cragg works as a charwoman for retired Colonel Whitforth and as a cleaner at an office block in London. It is whilst doing her office cleaning that she retrieves a cigar discarded by financier James Ryder as a gift for the Colonel, wrapping it in a scrap of paper. The Colonel discovers that the scrap of paper is actually a telegram containing details about a City takeover bid that has fallen through. He unscrupulously uses this insider information to make £5,000 on the stock exchange, which he offers to share equally with Mrs. Cragg.

Though she does not understand what has happened, she is convinced that he has done something wrong, so she goes to inform Ryder. However, before she can, she hears him on the telephone talking about his plan to demolish Pitt Street, evicting her and all her friends, so he can erect an office building. She argues with him, to no avail. He tells her, "If you want anything, you've got to go out and get it ... so long as it's legal." She takes his advice to heart.

Determined to foil Ryder's plan, she recruits three of her friends and neighbours in Pitt Street, fellow 'chars' who clean the offices of other noted financiers, to gather information. They form the company "Ladezudu Ltd" ("Ladies Who Do"), a speculation syndicate headed by Whitforth. All goes well until they invest all of their capital, now £60,000, in an Irish pig producer, only to lose everything when an outbreak of swine fever kills the stock.

Meanwhile, Ryder and his partner Sydney Tait offer the residents of Pitt Street £100 each if they agree to move within a month, with very little success. Ryder desperately needs the office building project to succeed, otherwise he will be wiped out. Aware of Ryder's precarious finances, Tait dissolves their partnership. However, having lost everything, the ladies are unable to put up a fight when Ryder brings his demolition crew in. Then the Colonel brings news: when the pigs were buried, valuable "deposits" were discovered, meaning Ladezudu will recoup much more than their investment. Heartened, Mrs. Cragg organises stiff resistance, which convinces Ryder's investor Strang to withdraw from the project. The Colonel invites Ryder to his office to discuss selling out. There he meets the board of directors, the four charwomen, and realises how they obtained their information. The Colonel invites him to lunch to discuss Ryder joining the board. After they all leave, an unknown man enters the room and starts going through their waste paper.

== Cast ==
- Peggy Mount as Mrs. Cragg
- Robert Morley as The Colonel
- Harry H. Corbett as James Ryder
- Miriam Karlin as Mrs. Higgins
- Avril Elgar as Emily Parish
- Dandy Nichols as Mrs. Merryweather
- Jon Pertwee as Sydney Tait
- Joan Benham as Miss Pinsent
- Ron Moody as Police Inspector
- Cardew Robinson as Police Driver
- Nigel Davenport as Mr. Strang
- Arthur Howard as chauffeur
- Ernest Clark as stockbroker
- Tristram Jellinek as 2nd stockbroker
- John Laurie as Doctor MacGregor
- Graham Stark as foreman
- Brian Rawlinson as shop steward
- Harry Fowler as drill operator
- Bruce Wightman as bulldozer driver
- Margaret Boyd as Mrs. Parish
- Arthur Mullard as Mr. Merryweather
- Ed Devereaux as Mr. Gubbins
- Marianne Stone as Mrs. Gubbins
- Raymond Smith as hydraulic shovel driver
- Carol White as Sandra
- Barbara Mitchell as Rose

== Production ==
The film was shot at Twickenham Studios and on location around London.

== Critical reception ==
Kinematograph Weekly called the film a "money maker" at the British box office for 1964.

Monthly Film Bulletin wrote: "Unusually slow in getting started, this back-street and big-business farce is only intermittently amusing, and then only mildly. A basically promising idea is not exploited to good comedy advantage until the last twenty minutes or so, when the film boils into acceptable farce. The 'ladies' of the title are dominated by Peggy Mount and Miriam Karlin; Avril Elgar and Dandy Nichols are relegated to subsidiary roles in which they can shine only at moments."

The Radio Times Guide to Films gave the film 2/5 stars, writing: "A firm favourite in such TV series as The Larkins and George and the Dragon, Peggy Mount found films harder to come by. In the sixth of her ten pictures, she's joined by those other sitcom stalwarts Miriam Karlin and Dandy Nichols, as a trio of charladies who make a killing on the stock market through the tips they find among the office rubbish. With Harry H Corbett in support, this should have been quite amusing, but the ponderous script and the flat direction make it a one-joke bore."

Leslie Halliwell said: "Mild farce sustained by familiar actors."

== Home media ==
Ladies Who Do was released on DVD in the UK on 24 March 2008.
