= Philip Stone =

British actor (1924–2003)

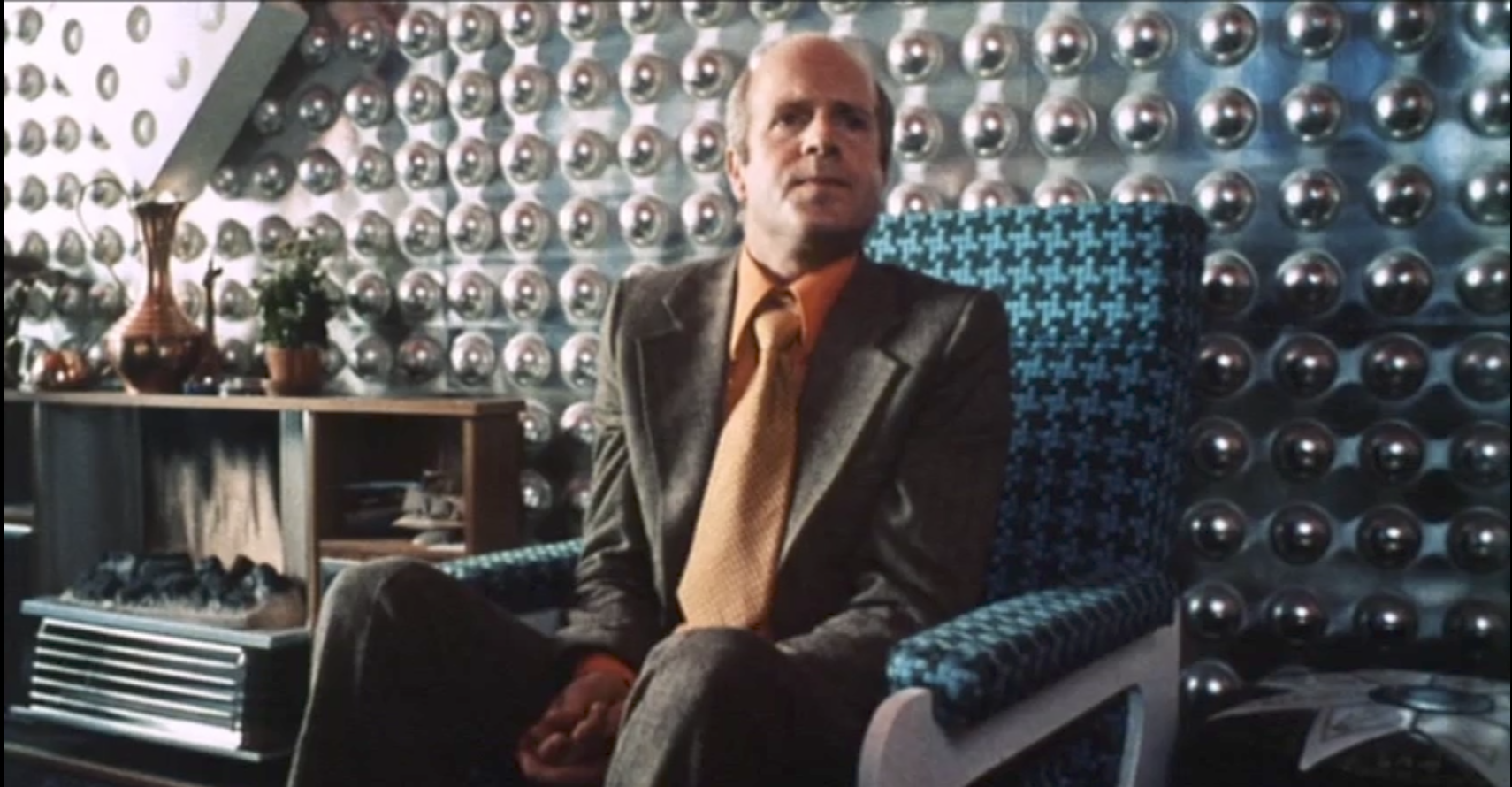
- Stone in A Clockwork Orange (1971)
- Born: 14 April 1924; Kirkstall, West Riding of Yorkshire, England
- Died: 15 June 2003 (aged 79); London, England
- Other name: Philip Stones
- Occupation: Actor
- Years active: 1960–1999
- Spouse: Margaret Pickford (m. 1953; died 1984)
- Children: 2

Philip Stone (14 April 1924 – 15 June 2003) was an English actor known for portraying film characters such as "Pa", the father of Alex DeLarge, in A Clockwork Orange (1971); General Alfred Jodl in Hitler: The Last Ten Days (1973); Delbert Grady in The Shining (1980); and Captain Phillip Blumburtt in Indiana Jones and the Temple of Doom (1984). His final film role was as the Bishop in The Baby of Mâcon (1993).

On television, Stone is known for his roles as Detective Sergeant Sowman in Coronation Street, Brigadier Davidson in The Rat Catchers, and Sir John Gallagher in Justice.

== Early life ==
Philip Stone (né Stones) was born in Kirkstall, Leeds. He was the youngest of four children; his father was a secondary school headmaster. He served in the Royal Air Force during the final two years of the Second World War.

== Career ==
Stone's professional theatre career began in London in 1947. He performed a range of roles in repertory theatre before moving to London in 1960, becoming a regular on television, often playing "tough-minded authority figures". He appeared in many popular series, including the first two episodes of The Avengers (he was one of only two guest actors—the other being Warren Mitchell—to have played the same role twice in the series), The Saint, Coronation Street, Justice, Bergerac, Yes Minister, Heartbeat, A Touch of Frost, and Dalziel and Pascoe.

Stone was the only actor to appear in three consecutive Stanley Kubrick films. First, he played the central character Alex's "P" (as in "M" and "P" for "Ma" and "Pa") in A Clockwork Orange (1971). Subsequently, he played Graham, the Lyndon family lawyer, in Barry Lyndon (1975), and Delbert Grady, the waiter/caretaker who murdered his family in The Shining (1980). Kubrick had seen him perform in David Storey's stage play The Contractor. The only other actor to be credited in three Kubrick films is Joe Turkel who appeared in Kubrick's early films The Killing, Paths of Glory and co-starred with Stone in The Shining.

Stone's other film roles included Thunderball (1965), Where Eagles Dare (1968), Quest for Love (1971), Flash Gordon (1980), and Indiana Jones and the Temple of Doom (1984). In the Ralph Bakshi animated film The Lord of the Rings (1978), he voiced the role of Théoden.

== Personal life ==
Stone was married to Margaret Pickford until her death in 1984. They lived in Lindfield Road, Ealing.

== Death ==
Stone died in Ealing, London, in 2003, aged 79.

== Filmography ==
=== Film ===
Year	Title	Role	Notes
1964	Unearthly Stranger	Professor John Lancaster	
1965	Never Mention Murder	Inspector	
1965	Thunderball	SPECTRE No. 5	Uncredited
1965	Life at the Top	Tiffield Interview Panel	Uncredited
1968	Where Eagles Dare	Sky Tram Operator	Uncredited
1969	Two Gentlemen Sharing	Mr. Burrows (Ethene's Father)	
1970	Fragment of Fear	CID Sergeant	
1970	Carry On Loving	Robinson	
1970	The Man Who Had Power Over Women	Angela's Father	
1971	Quest for Love	Mason	
1971	Carry On at Your Convenience	Mr. Bulstrode	Scenes deleted
1971	A Clockwork Orange	Dad	
1973	O Lucky Man!	Jenkins / Interrogator / Salvation Army Major	1974-Father Brown-The Mirror Of The Magistrate- Travis
1973	Hitler: The Last Ten Days	General Alfred Jodl	
1975	Barry Lyndon	Graham	
1976	Voyage of the Damned	Secretary	
1977	It Shouldn't Happen to a Vet	Jack	
1978	The Medusa Touch	Dean	
1978	The Lord of the Rings	King Théodon / Uglúk – Hai Captain (voice)	
1980	The Shining	Delbert Grady	
1980	Flash Gordon	Zogi, the High Priest	
1981	Green Ice	Jochim Kellerman	
1984	Pope John Paul II	Archbishop Baziak	
1984	Indiana Jones and the Temple of Doom	Captain Phillip Blumburtt	
1993	The Baby of Mâcon	The Bishop	
1994	Four Weddings and a Funeral	Wedding Guest	Uncredited

=== Television ===
Year	Title	Role	Notes
1960	The Old Pull 'n Push	Sid Miller	2 episodes
1961	The Avengers	Dr. Richard J. Tredding	2 episodes
1961	ITV Television Playhouse	Publican	Episode "The Widowing of Mrs. Holyrod"
1961	Court of Mystery	Brother Anselmo / Mr. Triggs	2 episodes
1961	Jacks and Knaves	Sergeant Harry Frost	Unknown episodes
1961	A Chance of Thunder	Ted Macauley	2 episodes
1962	Your World	Mr. Savage	2 episodes
1962	Emergency – Ward 10	Mr. Sales	Episode #1.501
1962	Top Secret	Doctor	Episode "The Second Man"
1962	The Big Pull	Doctor	Episode #1.2
1962	Compact	Dr. Gilbert Baxter / Airport Official	3 episodes
1962	Maigret	Father Damian	Episode "The Countess"
1962–1963	Z-Cars	Gardiner / Forensic Inspector	2 episodes
1963	Suspense	Inspector	Episode "The Honest Man"
1963	BBC Sunday-Night Play	Burroughs	Episode "A Right Crusader"
1963	Maupassant	Doctor	Episode "Fathers and Sons"
1963	The Saint	Inspector Carlton	Episode "Marcia"
1963	Badger's Bend	Uncle Steve	12 episodes
1964	Ann Veronica	Member of Parliament	Episode "Votes for Women"
1964	The Villains	Mr. Sutcliffe / Detective Inspector Colquhoun	2 episodes
1964	No Hiding Place	Detective Superintendent French / Detective Chief Inspector French	2 episodes
1964	The Indian Tales of Rudyard Kipling	Sir Dugald	Episode "A Germ Destroyer"
1964	The Edgar Wallace Mystery Theatre	Inspector	Episode "Never Mention Murder"
1964	Theatre 625	Captain Gibbs	Episode "Parade's End #3: A Man Could Stand Up"
1965	Crane	Boris	Episode "The Death of Karaloff"
1965	Dr. Finlay's Casebook	James Munro	Episode "Devils Dozens"
1965	Story Parade	Bennett	Episode "The Make-Believe Man"
1965	Blackmail	Mr. Patterson	Episode "The Lowest Bidder"
1966–1967	The Rat Catchers	Brigadier Davidson	26 episodes
1967	Thirty-Minute Theatre	Henry Ingram	Episode "The Isle Is Full of Noises"
1967	Champion House	Daniel Molesworth	Episode "The Second Freedom"
1967	City '68	Councillor Frank Allen	Episode "A Question of Priorities"
1969	John Browne's Body	French	3 episodes
1969	Fraud Squad	Stefan Pastek	Episode "Cold as Charity"
1969	Softly, Softly	Smedley	Episode "One Thing Leads to Another"
1971–1973	Justice	Sir John Gallagher	17 episodes
1976	Thriller	Burton	Episode "Death in Deep Water"
1979	S.O.S. Titanic	Captain Arthur Rostron	Television film
1980	We, the Accused	Reverend Hanks	1 episode
1983	Bergerac	Paul Verrian	Episode: "Fall of a Birdman"
1984	Crown Court	Judge	Episode: "Love and War Part 1"
1984	Yes Minister	Duncan	Episode "Party Games"
1985	Shadowlands	Harry Harrington	Television film
1985	Monsignor Quixote	Father Leopoldo	Television film
1985	Charters and Caldicott	Venables	5 episodes
1986	Harem	Arthur Grey	Television film
1986	Brat Farrar	Uncle Charles	Episode 6
1987	Our Geoff	Reg	Television film
1994	Heartbeat	Father Sergei	Episode: "Red Herring"
1994	The Ruth Rendell Mysteries	Roger Summers	2 episodes
1997	A Touch of Frost	Henry Finch	Episode: "A Penny for the Guy"
1997	Dalziel and Pascoe	Herbert Capstick	Episode: "Deadheads"
1999	Doomwatch: Winter Angel	Spencer Quist	Television film Final role
