= Chris Bryant (writer) =

British screenwriter (1936–2008)

- Born: Christopher Bryan Spencer Dobson; 7 June 1936; Bolton, Lancashire, England
- Died: 27 October 2008 (aged 72); Burford, Oxfordshire, England
- Known for: Screenwriter

Christopher Bryan Spencer Dobson (7 June 1936 – 27 October 2008), who wrote for the screen as Chris Bryant, was an English screenwriter and occasional actor (usually performing in productions he wrote himself).

== Early life ==
Christopher Brian Spencer Dobson was born in Bolton, Lancashire, a great-grandson of Sir Benjamin Dobson (1847–1898), who made a large fortune as a manufacturer of textile machinery and became mayor of Bolton. Dobson was educated at Radley College, Corpus Christi College, Cambridge, where he read law, and finally McGill University, Canada, where he received a Master of Civil Law degree in 1959.

Dobson remained in Canada, and in 1960 he was working as a private secretary to Davie Fulton, the Canadian Minister of Justice, while in his spare time appearing as a stand-up comedian. This caused a minor scandal when it was revealed in the House of Commons of Canada.

He later returned to England, where he settled at Burford, Oxfordshire, and died on 27 October 2008 aged 72.

== Writing credits ==
- Special Branch (TV series) (1969) TV Series
- The Man Who Had Power Over Women (1970)
- Don't Look Now (1973) (screenplay)
- The Girl from Petrovka (1974)
- The Spiral Staircase (1975)
- Golden Rendezvous (1977) ... a.k.a. Nuclear Terror (USA: TV title)
- Joseph Andrews (1977) (screenplay)
- The Awakening (1980) ... a.k.a. The Wakening (UK)
- Martin's Day (1984)
- Sword of Gideon (1986) (TV)
- Lady Jane (1986) (story)
- Stealing Heaven (1988)
- Young Catherine (1991) (written by)
- One Against the Wind (1991) (TV) (written by)
- Foreign Affairs (1993) (TV) (teleplay)
- The House That Mary Bought (1995) (TV) (screenplay)
- Miracle at Midnight (1998) (TV) (written by)
- Don't Look Now (2007) (announced) (1973 screenplay)

== Acting credits ==
- Joseph Andrews (1977) .... Wicked Squire's Steward
- Young Catherine (1991) (TV) .... Doctor Lande
- Only in Hollywood (2002) .... The Preacher
