= Ruth Trouncer =

British actress (born 1930)

- Born: Isabel Ruth Trouncer; 9 September 1930 (age 96); London, England
- Occupation: Actress
- Years active: 1957–1991 (film and television)
- Spouse: Michael D. Ingrams (m. 1960, div. 1967)

Isabel Ruth Trouncer (born 9 September 1930) is a British stage, film and television actress.

== Life and career ==
Isabel Ruth Trouncer was born in London, England, on 9 September 1930, the daughter of the actor Cecil Trouncer. In 1960 she married actor, director and producer Michael Dunham Ingrams (1925–2009) in London. The couple later divorced in 1967.

During the late 1950s she had a recurring role on the television series The Larkins.

== Selected filmography ==
=== Television ===
- The Larkins (1958–60)
- The Human Jungle (1964)
- No Hiding Place (1965)
- Gideon's Way (1966)
- Adam Adamant Lives! (1966)
- The Avengers (1967)
- Crown Court (1973)
- Poldark (1975)
- Wilde Alliance (1978)
- We, the Accused (1980)
- Strangers and Brothers (1984)

=== Film ===
- No Smoking (1955)
- Small Hotel (1957)
- The Family Way (1966)
- The Man Who Haunted Himself (1970)
- The Man Who Had Power Over Women (1970)
- There's a Girl in My Soup (1970)

== Bibliography ==
- Tise Vahimagi & Michael Grade. British television: an illustrated guide. Oxford University Press, 1996.
