= John Browne's Body =

1969 British TV comedy series

- Starring: Peggy Mount
- No. of series: 1
- No. of episodes: 7

Original release
- Network: ITV
- Release: 3 April – 15 May 1969

John Browne's Body is a British television comedy series that was first broadcast in 1969 on ITV. Produced by Associated Television (ATV), it starred popular actress Peggy Mount.

== Production ==
The seven episodes of the sitcom aired between 3 April and 15 May 1969. The show was written by Rene Basilioco and directed and produced by Shaun O'Riordan. Peggy Mount and Naunton Wayne starred in the television series.

All seven episodes are believed to have been destroyed.

== Cast ==
- Peggy Mount as Virginia Browne
- Naunton Wayne as Fitzroy
- Philip Stone as French
- Trisha Mortimer as Kiki
- Eric Kent as Spiro

== Reception ==
In a negative review of the first episode, Angela Moreton of The Stage and Television Today wrote, "There were some nice touches, but regrettably this first instalment showed no signs of carrying all successfully before it. The comedy was too forced and the laughs did not flow naturally." The Western Daily Press reviewer Jean Blackmore called actress Peggy Mount "very subdued" in the show, lamenting that the script failed to allow her to use her "celebrated sergeant major's voice". Blackmore concluded that the show "did not provide many opportunities for laughs either". The Runcorn Guardian television critic Tom Gregg thought the show's stars, Mount and Naunton Wayne, were "undoubted assets" though said he was skeptical that "even they can inject more than an occasional titter into this silly story of underworld fun".
