= ITV Sunday Night Drama =

Television series

ITV Sunday Night Drama is a UK television anthology series produced by ABC Weekend Television, Associated Television (ATV), Associated-Rediffusion Television, and Granada Television. 74 episodes aired on the ITV (TV network) from 1959 to 1980.

Directors included Ken Russell, Mike Newell (director), Waris Hussein, and Vivian Matalon. Among its writers were Christopher Fry, Ken Russell, Arthur Hailey, Christopher Hampton, and Arnold Bennett.

Guest stars included Anthony Hopkins, Christopher Plummer, James Mason, Jean Marsh, Michael Kitchen, Kate Nelligan, Michael Gambon, David Warner, Tim Curry, Judy Geeson, and Derek Benfield
