= Peggy Mount =

English actress (1915–2001)

Peggy Mount OBE
- Born: Margaret Rose Mount; 2 May 1915; Southend-on-Sea, Essex, England
- Died: 13 November 2001 (aged 86); Northwood, London, England
- Occupation: Actress
- Years active: 1944–1996

Margaret Rose Mount (2 May 1915 – 13 November 2001) was an English actress. As a child, she found acting an escape from an unhappy home life. After playing in amateur productions, she was taken on by a repertory company and spent nine years in various British towns, learning her craft. In 1955, she got her big break in the comic play Sailor Beware!: she created the leading role in a repertory production and, though unknown to London audiences, was given the part when the play was presented in the West End. She became known for playing domineering middle-aged women in plays, films and television shows.

Mount occasionally performed in comedies from the classical repertoire, including works by Shakespeare, Jonson, Goldsmith and Sheridan, and she was a member of The Old Vic, National Theatre and Royal Shakespeare companies in the 1960s, '70s and '80s, respectively.

Later in her career, Mount was cast more frequently in serious parts, including the title role of Bertolt Brecht's Mother Courage on stage, and in several television dramas. She retired after going blind and spent her last years in the actors' retirement home, Denville Hall, in northwest London.

== Life and career ==
=== Early years ===
My older sister was a brilliant pianist and she was always held up as an example to me. I lived entirely in her shadow. My mother told me I was wicked and worthless. Now, when I look back, it is clear that my mother never loved me. She didn't even like me, and I grew up without affection or love from her.

— Peggy Mount, quoted in 2001

Mount was born in Southend-on-Sea, Essex, the younger child of Alfred John Mount, a grocer's assistant, and his wife, Rose, née Penney. Her childhood was unhappy; her father was an invalid who struggled to support his family, and her mother displayed no sign of affection for their younger daughter. Mount was educated at Leigh North Street School, Leigh-on-Sea, where she first discovered her talent for acting, playing Rose in Snow White and Rose Red. Her father died when she was fourteen; her schooling came to an end and she began working as a secretary.

There were theatrical antecedents in the family: Mount's grandfather had started the first minstrel show on the end of Great Yarmouth pier. As a schoolgirl, she enjoyed acting in the drama society of her local Wesleyan chapel and after she left school she performed with local amateur companies. She took lessons from a drama tutor, Phyllis Reader, at weekends.

Her first professional appearance was at Keighley, Yorkshire, in Hindle Wakes in 1944. With Harry Hanson and his Hanson Court touring company, her parts included the eccentric Dowager Queen in The Sleeping Prince. She stayed with the company for three years and then for six years she worked with a succession of provincial repertory companies, playing what The Times later called "a formidable gallery of mainly working-class roles". There were seasons in Colchester, Preston, Dundee, Wolverhampton, Liverpool, Birmingham and Worthing. In 1954, Mount made her film debut, in the small role of Mrs Larkin in The Embezzler.

=== 1950s ===
During the Worthing repertory season, Mount played the central role, the domestic tyrant Emma Hornett, in a new comedy, Sailor Beware! She was a success in the part, but when a London management wanted to present the play in the West End, they looked for a better-known name than hers. Failing to find anyone more suitable, they gave the part to Mount, who achieved overnight celebrity after the first night, at the Strand Theatre in February 1955. The Daily Mirror described her as "The toast of the town ... the actress London is raving about". In The Observer, Kenneth Tynan commented, "She scorches the earth about her ... The savage impatience of Miss Mount's acting must be seen to be believed ... The house rightly rose to her at the curtain."

Mount appeared in two films released in 1956: she played Police Sergeant Fire in Dry Rot, an adaptation of the Whitehall farce, and she reprised the role of Emma Hornett in a film version of Sailor Beware!. Over the rest of the 1950s, her career included stage, cinema and television work. She played the cameo role of the Charwoman in Diego Fabbri's religious drama Man on Trial at the Lyric Theatre, London in 1957. In the same year, she featured in the comedy film The Naked Truth, with Terry-Thomas and Peter Sellers. From 1958 onwards, she became a regular television performer. Opposite Richard Hearne, she was cast as a landlady in The Adventures of Mr. Pastry, and then in a central role in The Larkins, an early ITV comedy series featuring David Kossoff and Mount as a suburban London couple, Alf and Ada Larkins, and their family. Six series of the show were produced between 1958 and 1964, and the leading characters, the put-upon but wily Alf and the formidable Ada, appeared in a spin-off feature film, Inn for Trouble. In a 1958 television version of Arsenic and Old Lace, Mount was cast against type as dotty serial poison-dispensing Abby Brewster.

Her last stage role of the 1950s was Florence Povis in Farewell, Farewell, Eugene at the Garrick Theatre in June 1959, co-starring with Margaret Rutherford.

=== 1960s ===
In 1960, Mount was cast as the Nurse in Franco Zeffirelli's production of Romeo and Juliet at The Old Vic. The notices for her (and the production) were tepid, but the role remained one of her two favourites, along with Emma Hornett. In the same Old Vic season she played Mrs. Hardcastle in She Stoops to Conquer for which her notices were uniformly excellent. Kenneth Tynan commented in a review for The Observer: "We shall not soon see a Mrs. Hardcastle who scolds, capers, coquettes and bellows with anything like the majestic, intimidating authority of Peggy Mount. For her sake alone I recommend a visit."

In 1961–62, Mount appeared in another ITV sitcom called Winning Widows, co-starring with Avice Landone as two sisters who have each survived three husbands. The series made little impression, and it was not until 1966 that Mount was cast in a television series that approached the popularity of The Larkins; this was the sitcom George and the Dragon, with Sid James and John Le Mesurier. Four series were made between 1966 and 1968. Mount was given a role of a quite different character in the comedy-thriller series John Browne's Body, in which she played a bungling amateur sleuth. The series aired in 1969 on ITV and was produced by Associated Television (ATV); all seven episodes are believed to have been destroyed.

Mount's films in the 1960s included One Way Pendulum (1964) with George Cole, Eric Sykes and Jonathan Miller; Hotel Paradiso (1966) with Alec Guinness and Gina Lollobrigida; and Carol Reed's film of the musical Oliver! (1968) in which she played Mrs Bumble. Mount appeared regularly on BBC Radio from the 1960s to the 1980s, on panel shows, Woman's Hour, and arts features. Her acting roles for radio in the 1960s included the title role in Ted Willis's Big Bertha (1962), Emma Hornett in adaptations of Sailor Beware! and Watch it, Sailor (both 1965) and the Queen of Hearts in Alice in Wonderland (1965).

On stage, Mount appeared in London and the regions during the decade. At Bristol Old Vic in October 1962 she played Queenie Hesseltine in All Things Bright and Beautiful, subsequently appearing at the Phoenix Theatre, London, in the same play; at the Globe in March 1964 she played Mrs. Spicer in Mother's Boy; at the Arts Theatre, Ipswich, in September 1964 she appeared as Mrs. Wolff in The Beaver Coat; and at the Alexandra Theatre, Birmingham in May 1965 she played Gladys in Did You Feel It Move? In 1968 she toured with Naunton Wayne and Jon Pertwee in Oh, Clarence!, a stage adaptation of P. G. Wodehouse's Blandings Castle stories.

=== 1970s–90s ===
In the West End in 1970, Mount played Clara Soppitt in J. B. Priestley's When We Are Married, with Hugh Lloyd as her henpecked husband. The critic Michael Billington called her performance, "a formidable addition to this actress's gallery of tyrannical matriarchs".

From 1971 to 1972, Mount starred in the television comedy Lollipop Loves Mr Mole with Hugh Lloyd and Pat Coombs. Her character in this series was still formidable, but gentler than many of her characteristic earlier roles. On BBC radio, Mount appeared as Mistress Otter in Ben Jonson's The Silent Woman (1972), Opinionated Alice in Stargazy on Zummerdown (1978) and Madame Arcati in Noël Coward's Blithe Spirit (1983).

In the 1970s, Mount appeared in several touring productions, prominent among which was her Mrs Malaprop in Sheridan's The Rivals. From 1976 to 1979, she was a member of the National Theatre company. Her Donna Pasqua in Il Campiello by Carlo Goldoni (1976) gained good notices, as did her Mrs Hewlett in Ben Travers's Plunder (1978).

Among her most praised performances was the title role of Brecht's Mother Courage at the Birmingham Repertory Theatre in 1977. The Guardian called her portrayal "exceptional" and "perfectly Brechtian". The Daily Telegraph recorded, "Her acting admitted no trace of self-pity or of the laughter she had been accustomed to provoke, and it proved what a serious and emotional actress she could be when given the chance."

Between 1977 and 1981, she starred in the Yorkshire Television sitcom You're Only Young Twice, as the forthright Flora Petty. From 1983 to 1985, she was a member of the Royal Shakespeare Company, where critics found her outstanding in both The Dillen and Measure for Measure, and she was the star of the company's production of the farce The Happiest Days of Your Life, as the headmistress of St. Swithin's.

I expected Miss. Mount to be a treat, and she is: sweeping on in a vast robe topped off with an Indian feather ... from her sepulchral invocations to her volcanically indignant exits, she is terrific.

— Irving Wardle in The Times on Mount's Madam Arcati

In 1987, Mount appeared as Ursula in Ben Jonson's Bartholomew Fair at the Open Air Theatre, Regent's Park. Two years later, she was Madame Arcati in a revival of Blithe Spirit at the Lyric, Hammersmith. After her long run as a sitcom star had ended with You're Only Young Twice, Mount had a regular role as Aunt Fanny in the second series of All Change (1991), a children's programme starring Frankie Howerd.

Her obituarist in The Times wrote of Mount's later television appearances: "In dramas such as Punishment Without Crime (1985) and the harrowing Trial of Klaus Barbie (1988) she showed just what a fine actress she really was, and in an episode of Inspector Morse she was a most unnerving Sister of Mercy." Mount's later appearances on television included Doctor Who (in "The Greatest Show in the Galaxy" in 1988–89, in the cameo role of the Stallslady), Mrs. Weaver in Virtual Murder (1992), and The Tomorrow People (as Mrs. Butterworth in the second episode of the 1994 story "The Monsoon Man").

As the nanny in Chekhov's Uncle Vanya (1996, Chichester) with a cast that included Derek Jacobi, Imogen Stubbs, Trevor Eve and Frances Barber, Mount gave what her biographer Verena Wright calls "a great performance as the play's most sympathetic and sensible character". This production played on a provincial tour and in the West End. It was Mount's last play. During a performance her sight, which had been deteriorating, failed completely. She managed to finish the run, after which she retired from the theatre.

== Personal life ==
Mount was appointed OBE in 1996.

According to her own account, and that of those who knew her well, Mount's character was very different from the ferocious women she usually played on stage and screen. The Times said of her: "A warm-hearted and compassionate woman, she enjoyed nothing more than meeting her fans and entertaining friends." She never married. She severed connections with her family in the 1940s; she gathered about her a small adoptive family of close friends.

Her biography Everything I Ever Wanted, by Andrew Ross, was published in 2019 by Fantom Films Limited.

== Filmography ==
Year	Title	Role	Notes
1954	The Embezzler	Mrs. Larkin	
1956	Sailor Beware! (released in the US as Panic in the Parlor)	Emma Hornett	
1956	Dry Rot	Sergeant Fire	
1957	The Naked Truth	Flora Ransom	
1960	Inn for Trouble	Ada Larkin	
1963	Ladies Who Do	Mrs. Cragg	
1964	One Way Pendulum	Mrs. Mara Gantry	
1966	Hotel Paradiso	Angelique Boniface	
1966	Finders Keepers	Mrs. Bragg	
1968	Oliver!	Mrs. Bumble	
1991	The Princess and the Goblin	Goblin Queen	Voice

== Selected Television roles ==
Year	Title	Role	Notes
1958	ITV Play of the Week	Abby Brewster	TV Play: Arsenic and the Old Lace
1958	ITV Television Playhouse	Mamma Decomano	TV Play: The Visit to Paradise Buildings
1958–64	The Larkins	Ada Larkin	40 episodes
1961-2	Winning Windows	Martha	13 episodes
1965	Comedy Playhouse	Mrs. Preston	Episode: Mother Came Too
1966-8	George and the Dragon	Gabrielle Dragon	26 episodes
1969	John Browne's Body	Virginia Browne	7 episodes
1971-2	Lollipop Loves Mr Mole	Maggie Robinson	13 episodes
1973	ITV Play of the Week	Queen of Spades	TV Play: Queen of Hearts
1976	The Chiffy Kids	Mrs Foster	Episode: Decorators Limited
1977–81	You're Only Young Twice	Flora Petty	31 episodes
1987	ScreenPlay	Joly	Episode: The Trial of Klaus Barbie
1988	The Ray Bradbury Theatre	The Judge	Episode: Punishment Without Crime
1988-9	Doctor Who	Stallslady	Serial: The Greatest Show in the Galaxy 2 episodes
1991	Inspector Morse	Nun	Episode: Fat Chance
1991	All Change	Aunt Fanny	6 episodes
1991	Casualty	Eliza Johnstone	Episode: Sins of Omission
1992	Virtual Murder	Mrs. Weaver	Episode: A Dream of Dracula
1994	The Tomorrow People	Mrs. Butterworth	Episode: The Monsoon: Part 2
