= Talk of a Million =

- U.S. poster
- Directed by: John Paddy Carstairs
- Written by: Frederick Gotfurt
- Based on: the play They Got What They Wanted by Louis D'Alton
- Produced by: Alex Boyd
- Starring: Jack Warner; Barbara Mullen
- Cinematography: Jack Hildyard
- Edited by: Edward B. Jarvis
- Music by: Leighton Lucas
- Production company: Associated British Picture Corporation
- Distributed by: Associated British-Pathé (U.K.)
- Release date: March 1951; (U.K.)
- Running time: 77 minutes
- Country: United Kingdom
- Language: English
- Box office: £96,963 (UK)

Talk of a Million (also known as You Can't Beat the Irish, Smiling Irish Eyes and When Irish Eyes Are Smiling) is a 1951 British comedy film directed by John Paddy Carstairs, starring Jack Warner and Barbara Mullen. It was written by Frederick Gotfurt based on the 1947 play They Got What They Wanted by Louis D'Alton.

== Premise ==
Shakespeare-loving Bartley Murnahan, is a likeable, work-shy idler, who allows creditors and others to believe that he's due a half-a-million pounds inheritance. Using only his wits and the new estimation in which his creditors and others then form of him, their sudden good-will and business co-operation allow him to write-off his debts, establish his impoverished family in business, and to marry his daughter to the son of a local landowner, whose Father had formerly scorned her. How long shall it take before everyone sees through his blarney?

== Cast ==
- Jack Warner as Bartley Murnahan
- Barbara Mullen as Bessie Murnahan
- Joan Kenny as Sally Murnahan
- Elizabeth Erskine as Norah Murnahan
- Ronan O'Casey as Derry Murnahan
- Vincent Ball as Jack Murnahan
- Noel Purcell as Matty McGrath
- Paul Connell as Joe McGrath
- Michael Dolan as Tubridy
- Niall MacGinnis as Tom Cassidy
- Alfie Bass as Lorcan
- Sid James as John C. Moody
- Anita Sharp-Bolster as Miss Rafferty
- Tony Quinn as Sacristan
- John McDarby as porter
- Milo O'Shea as signwriter
- Michael Trubshawe as church groundsman (uncredited)

== Critical reception ==
Kine Weekly wrote: "Rich, natural humour, stoutly underpinned by popular romance, artfully conceals the length of its tongue. Wordy, yet refreshing, it's a welcome change from orthodox fare."

The Daily Film Renter wrote: "Stage Irish comedy of the sort which only stops short of bejabbers, it puts over endearing and amusing characters. The rural setting is pretty, so that, all in all, it adds up to a sunny picture with never a punchy moment."

Picturegoer wrote: "The film's a pleasant enough little number with a hint of the theatre about it. Although the scriptwriting is quite competent, it hasn't been able to disguise entirely the story's stage origin."

The New York Times wrote: "a pleasantly garrulous little item that turned up at the Park Avenue yesterday...The plot, it might be noted, is closer to contrivance than ingenuity but the performances are uniformly fine. Jack Warner is excellent as the cultured but lazy father, who is anxious to help his brood and just as ready to quote the Bard at a moment's notice. Barbara Mullen does equally well in the role of his persevering wife. Acting honors, however, go to Michael Dolan, an Abbey Theatre veteran, as the designing village grocer, whose schemes to bilk our hero backfire. Only Barry Fitzgerald could approximate his characterization and it would take a poteen-filled denizen of a Dublin shebeen to equal his brogue and delivery. Add too, the explosive performance of Noel Purcell as an irascible farmer."

TV Guide, reviewing the film as You Can't Beat the Irish, gave two out of five stars, calling it "Pleasantly whimsical, as expected from the title."
