= The New Forest Rustlers =

- Written by: Stephen Mogridge
- Directed by: Ian Curteis
- Country of origin: United Kingdom
- Original language: English
- No. of series: 1
- No. of episodes: 6

Production
- Producer: John Braybon
- Running time: 25 minutes
- Production company: Southern Television

Original release
- Network: ITV
- Release: 29 September – 3 November 1966

The New Forest Rustlers is a six-part children's television serial made by Southern Television and broadcast by ITV in 1966.

== Story ==
The television serial was adapted by children's author Stephen Mogridge from two of his own stories for children.

The cast included Anita Harris, Reginald Marsh, Ronan O'Casey, Daphne Foreman, Malcolm Taylor, Thomas de Ville, Patrick Westwood, Dennis Adams, Neville Sarson and Gina Clow. The serial was produced by John Braybon and directed by Ian Curteis.

== Cast ==
- Anita Harris - Maureen
- Reginald Marsh – Inspector Foster
- Ronan O'Casey – The Chief
- Daphne Foreman – Patricia Deverill
- Paul Guess – Phil Deverill
- Malcolm Taylor - Joe
- Thomas de Ville – Ginger
- Monica Stewart – Mrs Guise
- Patrick Westwood – Mr Guise
- Michael Sarson – Freddie Guise
- Gina Clow – Fiona Guise
- Neville Barber - Pierre
