= The Baby of Mâcon =

1993 film directed by Peter Greenaway

- Theatrical poster
- Directed by: Peter Greenaway
- Written by: Peter Greenaway
- Produced by: Kees Kasander
- Starring: Julia Ormond; Ralph Fiennes; Philip Stone; Jonathan Lacey; Don Henderson
- Cinematography: Sacha Vierny
- Edited by: Chris Wyatt
- Distributed by: Electric (UK)
- Release dates: 17 May 1993 (Cannes); 11 September 1993 (Toronto); 17 September 1993 (United Kingdom); 11 November 1993 (Germany); 5 January 1994 (France)
- Running time: 122 minutes
- Countries: United Kingdom; France; Germany; Belgium; Netherlands
- Language: English
- Budget: £2 million
- Box office: £88,795

The Baby of Mâcon is a 1993 historical drama film written and directed by Peter Greenaway, and starring Ralph Fiennes, Julia Ormond (in her theatrical debut) and Philip Stone, in his final film appearance.

The film is set in Tuscany during the mid-17th century, in the court of Cosimo III de' Medici as he and his court watch actors perform a parable about a baby born in the town of Mâcon whose inhabitants have been infertile for a generation. The birth of the baby boy is mythologized for various ends, initially because it marks the end of childlessness in a city.

The film premiered at the 1993 Cannes Film Festival. Because of the nudity and graphic scenes of violence, the film struggled to find distribution. It was not shown in the U.S. until 1997.

== Plot ==
In the mid-17th century, the court of Cosimo III de' Medici, Grand Duke of Tuscany gather to watch a play. The town of Mâcon is plagued with a curse that has made every woman barren and brought famine to the land. A woman is in labour signifying the first birth in many years which the midwives initially believe is a false labour due to The Mother's advanced years and general ugliness. However, she does give birth to a healthy baby boy. Her husband, the Father, immediately seeks to profit by selling potions to cure impotence. However, the elder Daughter of the couple is taken with the child and sees potential to use him to make herself rich.

Years later the Daughter successfully passes the child off as her own claiming him as a virgin birth to protect her own virtue. Various precious gifts are given to the Baby of Mâcon and a cult develops around him. The Daughter sells the Child's blessings of fertility in exchange for livestock and riches. She keeps the Mother and the Father imprisoned, along with the Child's wet nurse and a young girl chosen by her to be her father's sexual slave.

The Bishop, sensing a threat, considers the Daughter blasphemous and the Bishop's Son believes that either she is a virgin and the Child is not hers, or the Child is hers in which case the Daughter is a whore. Frustrated, the Daughter uncages her parents to show the Bishop's Son she is still a virgin but he refuses to believe her mother is the mother of the Child. The Daughter then takes the Bishop's Son to the farm where she keeps her livestock and offers her virginity to him. The Child stumbles across them and prevents the Bishop's Son from taking the Daughter's virginity by using his power to urge a sacred bull to gore the Bishop's Son. He warns the Daughter not to kill the bull, as even he will not be able to protect her from the consequences. The Daughter kills the bull and the townspeople discover her. Sensing opportunity the Bishop says she is unfit to be the Child's mother and takes custody of him.

The Bishop auctions off the Child's fluid with many suspecting he is being tortured to produce holy tears and blood which sell at high prices. At night, the Daughter sneaks into the Child's room and suffocates him for abandoning her.

The Bishop orders her executed; however, the laws of the town expressly forbid the execution of a virgin. To circumvent this Medici makes a suggestion to the Bishop that the Daughter be raped. The Bishop dispenses holy pardons to members of the Militia allowing them to rape the Daughter. The scene is to take place in a curtained-off canopy bed behind which the actress playing the Daughter acts out screams. However, the actors in the scene actually rape her while Medici and the court, stationed outside, gleefully count off the rapists. After she is raped by 208 men she is sentenced to execution only for it to be discovered that she is already dead from the trauma.

The townspeople gather to bury the body of the Child. Fearful to be without his powers they begin to gently strip his relics and eventually viciously dismember him hoping that his body will bring them good fortune.

Famine falls once again onto the city of Mâcon. The cast members take a bow and the rest of the court turns around and bows to the camera, acknowledging that they too are performers.

== Cast ==
- Julia Ormond as the Daughter
- Ralph Fiennes as the Bishop's Son
- Philip Stone as the Bishop
- Jonathan Lacey as Cosimo III de' Medici
- Don Henderson as the Father Confessor
- Celia Gregory as Mother Superior
- Jeff Nuttall as the Majordomo
- Jessica Hynes as the First Midwife (as Jessica Stevenson)
- Kathryn Hunter as the Second Midwife
- Frank Egerton as the Prompter
- Phelim McDermott as the First Tutor
- Tony Vogel as the Father
- Carol Hudson as the Concubine

== Production ==
Julia Ormond and Ralph Fiennes share a violent and passionate scene which Ormond remembers shooting in a church hall while Peter Greenaway ate wine gums. "It was the most surreal experience because every now and then you'd hear 'rustle rustle munch munch'. Being naked in front of people who were clothed bothered me so much I didn't know if I would break out in hives... After a while you get used to it and you want to throw up at the same time."

== Reception ==
The film was screened out of competition at the 1993 Cannes Film Festival. Jonathan Rosenbaum of the Chicago Reader, however, noted that he "watched it to the end out of a sense of duty, not with pleasure or any hope of edification", while also describing the action as "lushly and rather beautifully filmed (by Sacha Vierny)".

In 2002, film director Andrew Repasky McElhinney selected two rare motion pictures, Isle of Forgotten Sins (directed by Edgar G. Ulmer, 1943) and The Baby of Macon, to have their belated Philadelphia premieres (in archival 35MM prints) for a "fantasy double feature" film series at the Prince Music Theater. In the program notes for the screening, McElhinney wrote:

"I have been insatiably drawn to termite and white-elephant art my entire movie-going life. ...white-elephant movies exist outside the bounds of rational criticism as immense and spectacular monuments to their director's monstrous genius, ego and hubris. Peter Greenaway's The Baby of Macon is such an animal, a multi-level Rocky Horror Picture Show set during a 1659 performance of a fifteenth century morality play, in which our perceptions of spectatorship, identity and construction are unsympathetically challenged and the fourth wall between "real" and "make-believe" continually assaulted. The beauty of the ravishing cinematography, deluxe production design, and a script that suggests the movie is merely "a play with music," are abrasively juxtaposed with graphic depictions of unspeakably cruel atrocities. Everything and everyone is incriminated in this challenging, ritualistic, and agnostic essay on the Nativity".

The film opened on seven screens in the UK and grossed £14,928 in its opening weekend and went on to gross £88,795.

The film has a rotten score of 38% on Rotten Tomatoes from eight critic reviews.
