= The Bespoke Overcoat =

1956 British short film by Jack Clayton

- Film poster
- Directed by: Jack Clayton
- Written by: Nikolai Gogol; Wolf Mankowitz
- Produced by: George K. Arthur; Jack Clayton
- Starring: Alfie Bass; David Kossoff
- Cinematography: Wolfgang Suschitzky
- Edited by: Stan Hawkes
- Production company: Romulus Films
- Distributed by: British Lion Films
- Release date: 7 October 1956
- Running time: 33 minutes
- Country: United Kingdom
- Language: English
- Budget: £5,000

The Bespoke Overcoat is a 1956 British black and white short film directed by Jack Clayton and starring Alfie Bass and David Kossoff. It was written by Wolf Mankowitz based on his 1953 play of the same name, adaptated from Nikolai Gogol's short story The Overcoat, with the action moved from Russia to the East End of London.

== Plot ==
The film titles run as a funeral takes place. A coffin is placed in the grave. We then see an overcoat being thrown on the coffin, before the grave is infilled. Morrie a Jewish tailor, speaks to himself in the mirror. He is then joined by the dead Fender. They debate the art of tailoring.

Fender is a lowly clerk in the warehouse of clothing manufacturers Ranting and Co. He complains to his boss, Mr Ranting that it is cold, and he wishes he had a good coat. Ranting ridicules him and says he will never be able to afford £20 for a good coat. He goes to a tailor friend, Morrie, to make a bespoke overcoat. They discuss the materials and the cost, which is agreed at £10.

As the coat progresses he goes for a fitting. The coat has no arms, and looks very big, but he says it is too tight under the arms. They agree that Fender will pay £2 at this stage. Ranting fires Fender. He goes to Morrie. They drink brandy by candlelight and Fender cries as he says he must cancel the order. Morrie says he will finish the coat nevertheless.

Fender lies in bed and regrets not fighting for his job, or fighting for a sheepskin coat. He coughs and coughs. He dies in his sleep. His ghost speaks to Morrie, who gives him the completed coat. However he still wants a sheepskin coat from Ranting's warehouse. The pair drink more brandy and go to the warehouse. Morrie asks if he can walk through the wall but Fender wishes to use the door.

They enter and find a rail of jackets. They agree Morrie's work is better but "Ranting owes me" he says. Fender wishes Morrie a long life and says "pray for me", as he slowly walks away into eternity. Back at his house, Morrie puts on a black skullcap and says a Jewish prayer.

== Cast ==
- Alfie Bass as Fender (ghost)
- David Kossoff as Morrie
- Alan Tilvern as Ranting
- Alf Dean as gravedigger (uncredited)

== Production ==
The film was financed by Romulus Films.

== Reception ==
The Monthly Film Bulletin wrote: "The folklore, though skilfully contrived, strikes one as a trifle synthetic, but Alfie Bass's performance is touching, and The Bespoke Overcoat ... is undoubtedly a serious and enterprising piece of work."

Sight and Sound wrote: "The dialogue has a deliberate idiomatic tang, the backgrounds – the warehouse, the meagre little rooms of Fender the clerk and his friend the tailor (David Kossoff), and a single melancholy street – become almost an abstraction of poverty. Directing his first film, Jack Clayton – formerly known as a producer – shows a firm, sensitive – response to the material, and the scene of Fender's death is imaginatively handled."

Pauline Kael called The Bespoke Overcoat "one of the best short-story films ever made".

== Accolades ==
The film won Best Short Story Film at the 1955 Venice Film Festival, and won an Oscar at the 29th Academy Awards in 1957 for Best Short Subject (Two-Reel).

== Stage play ==
The play was performed at the Arts Theatre in London with Kossoff and Bass and was directed by Alec Clunes. The supporting cast was Harold Kasket and Oscar Quitak.
