= The Man Who Had Power Over Women =

1970 British film by John Krish

- Directed by: John Krish
- Written by: Chris Bryant; Allan Scott
- Produced by: Judd Bernard
- Starring: Rod Taylor; Carol White; James Booth
- Cinematography: Gerry Turpin
- Edited by: Thom Noble
- Music by: Johnny Mandel
- Production company: Kettledrum Films
- Distributed by: AVCO Embassy
- Release date: 15 October 1970 (UK)
- Running time: 89 minutes
- Country: United Kingdom
- Language: English
- Box office: $11,400 (US)

The Man Who Had Power Over Women is a 1970 British comedy film directed by John Krish and starring Rod Taylor, Carol White and James Booth. It was written by Chris Bryant and Allan Scott. A successful talent agent grows disenchanted with his life and begins an affair with his best friend's wife.

== Plot ==
Peter Reaney is a successful public relations executive, managing pop singer Barry Black, a difficult client. Peter's neglected wife Angela leaves him, taking most of their money, and he begins an affair with Jody, the wife of his best friend Val.

Peter finds out that Black has made a fan called Mary Gray pregnant, and the former is shocked that his agency is arranging a clandestine abortion.

When Jody and Peter see Val to tell him of their affair, they find Val in bed with Jody's friend Frances. The next day, Val is killed in an accident. Jody and Peter decide to stay together.

Peter learns that Mary has died. He resigns from his job and assaults Black in front of a crowd of his fans.

== Cast ==
- Rod Taylor as Peter Reaney
- Carol White as Jody Pringle
- James Booth as Val Pringle
- Penelope Horner as Angela Reaney
- Charles Korvin as Alfred Felix
- Alexandra Stewart as Frances
- Keith Barron as Jake Braid
- Clive Francis as Barry Black
- Marie-France Boyer as Maggie
- Magali Noël as Mrs Franchetti
- Geraldine Moffat as Lydia Blake
- Wendy Hamilton as Mary Gray
- Ellis Dale as Norman
- Philip Stone as Angela's father
- Matthew Booth as Mark Pringle
- Sara Booth as Sarah Pringle
- Virginia Clay as Mrs Pringle
- Jimmy Jewel as Mr Pringle
- Diana Chance as stripper
- Patrick Durkin as Herbie
- Paul Farrell as Reaney's father
- Geoffrey Hughes as policeman
- Valerie Leon as Glenda
- Ruth Trouncer as Mrs Gray
- Jacki Piper as receptionist

== Production ==
The original director was Silvio Narizzano who left the project before shooting. Unhappy with subsequent changes, screenwriters Chris Bryant and Allan Scott requested their names be removed from the film.

== Critical reception ==
The Monthly Film Bulletin wrote: "A straightforward, not to say inanely obvious and sentimental message seems to underlie this story of the spiritual guilt and cowardice bred by commercial compromise. Everything in the development of the film ... solidly emphasises the moral lesson. Perhaps because the film's centre seems such a heavy platitude, some vestige of interest only begins to develop, by simple opposition, on the periphery. The title is the first incongruous note: There is not a male in the film to whom it could apply. The only positive quality of the two characters caught in a world they both despise is their friendship, on the level of drunken pranks, mock-homosexual badinage and obvious affection. But once the solemn affair with Jody begins, this amusing interplay disappears – only surfacing in such odd sick jokes as Val's death under a deluge of lavatory bowls and the line in his will bequeathing his love to Reaney and his body to 'science or the glue factory'. The theme is finally never more than half alive, with a tawdry existence in the margins of a superficial film."

Kine Weekly wrote: "A serious, but sometimes amusing look behind an aspect of the pop scene, this could have a fairly general appeal. ... The film has been adapted from the novel by Gordon Williams and has been fashioned and directed with liveliness so that the essentially grim story of greed, conceit and broken marriages comes over as an entertaining and thoughtful black comedy, even though most of the characters are drawn without much depth. The husband-and-wife quarrels, however, have the bite of truth and the humour has a sardonic strength. Rod Taylor, as Peter, uses his powerful personality and considerable experience to create something likeable, and Carol White brings a lot of quiet sympathy to the role of Jody. The film has the advantage of some very good supporting performances, notably by James Booth as the outwardly flippant but inwardly sincere Val; by Keith Barron as the pop star's fawning manager; by Clive Francis, as the odious Barry Black; and by Penelope Horner, as Peter's wife."

Boxoffice wrote: "Less discriminating audiences have responded far more than sophisticates, although the acting and direction by John Krish are capably handled. ... Taylor, long an accomplished light comedian, does more than his share to carry the film. Co-star James Booth is equally good, in comedy part that seems to have been written for him. ... Mingling of comedy, drama and sex scenes combines all the elements that popular taste dictates. Nudity is confined mainly to toplessness. ... An opportunity to saturate the sound track with pop tunes has been overlooked; only one song, "Bend Over Backwards" sung by Bill and Buster, is used."

The Radio Times Guide to Films gave the film 1/5 stars, writing: "This awful, cringe-inducing story about a public relations executive and his obnoxious pop star client was filmed at the fag end of the Swinging Sixties, and it has dated very badly. Although the film toys around with the moral issue of abortion, it never achieves more than a glossy vacuity."

British film critic Leslie Halliwell wrote: "Fashionable wallow in guilt and luxury, not very convincingly done."

Sight and Sound wrote: "The tone is bleakly cynical. Krish looks at London's youth culture from the POV of the ad men and music-industry nodes: everyone is completely old, totally pissed and doesn't care about anything, least of all their wives. The throwaway, period-specific misogyny is unusually stinging, particularly in its treatment of unwanted pregnancy. Carol White clevates a rather two-dimensional role with dignity and warmth, and the space-age, marital bachelor pad interiors are a lot of fun. Although an odd entry in any director's body of work, The Man Who Had Power Over Women reveals a lot about the attitudes of the money men most responsible for making London swing."
