= Lollipop Loves Mr Mole =

1971 British TV series

- Genre: Sitcom
- Written by: Jimmy Perry
- Directed by: David Askey; Shaun O'Riordan
- Starring: Peggy Mount; Hugh Lloyd; Pat Coombs; Rex Garner
- Country of origin: United Kingdom
- Original language: English
- No. of series: 2
- No. of episodes: 13

Production
- Running time: 30 minutes
- Production company: ATV

Original release
- Network: ITV
- Release: 25 October 1971 – 4 September 1972

Lollipop Loves Mr Mole is a British television sitcom written by Jimmy Perry and produced by ATV. Thirteen episodes were produced in two series of six and seven episodes respectively. The first episode was broadcast on the 25 October 1971.

== Synopsis ==
The domineering Maggie Robinson (Peggy Mount - the 'Lollipop' of the title) and her timid husband Reg aka 'Mr. Mole' (Hugh Lloyd) are a comically mismatched couple living in Fulham, London (they married late in life, 'Lollipop' having had aged parents to look after and 'Mr. Mole' having waited for 'Miss Right'). Their domestic bliss is interrupted by the arrival from Africa of Reg's brother, the brash, workshy Bruce (Rex Garner) and his hypochrondriac wife Violet (Pat Coombs). The comedy revolves partly around Reg and Maggie's attempts to get Bruce employment. Another feature is Reg's sinus trouble (which prevents him fully appreciating his wife's cooking).

Guest stars included Gordon Jackson, Michael Bates, Michael Knowles, John Clegg, Bill Pertwee, Carmel McSharry and Erik Chitty. Producers were David Askey and later Shaun O'Riordan.

The second series featured an electronic instrumental theme tune (the first series had Mount and Lloyd singing a love duet). For the second series, the title was changed to Lollipop. A special vignette of the show was produced for a Christmas compilation in 1971.

A DVD has been released of the only two surviving episodes (the others having been presumed lost), "A Marked Man" and "Lollipop and the Two Bares". Although the two series were produced in colour, the surviving episodes are only available in monochrome.

== Episode guide ==
=== Series 1 ===
1. "Home to Roost" (first broadcast October 25, 1971)
2. "Sweet Hearts" (November 1, 1971)
3. "Love in Gloom" (November 8, 1971)
4. "The Man in the Brown Coat" (November 15, 1971)
5. "Doctor Fruit Cake" (November 22, 1971)
6. "Somebody at the Door" (November 29, 1971)

=== Series 2 ===
1. "A Marked Man" (July 17, 1972)
2. "On Safari" (July 24, 1972)
3. "It's Only Natural Gas" (July 31, 1972)
4. "My Fur Lady" (August 7, 1972)
5. "Cock-a-Doodle-Don't" (August 14, 1972)
6. "Lollipop and the Two Bares" (August 21, 1972)
7. "Inspector Hardcastle Investigates" (September 4, 1972)

== Main cast ==
- Peggy Mount - Maggie Robinson
- Hugh Lloyd - Reg Robinson
- Pat Coombs - Violet
- Rex Garner - Bruce
- Sue Holderness - Receptionist
- Gordon Jackson - Dr McGregor
- Michael Bates - Mr Christmas
- John Cazabon - Raincoat man
- Erik Chitty - Dr English
- John Clegg - Taxi Driver
- Ivor Dean - Sir Humphrey Stevens
- Tommy Godfrey - Fred
- Eric Longworth - Secretary Crow
- Len Lowe - Announcer
- Victor Maddern - TV Man
- Larry Martyn - Tramp
- Carmel McSharry - Diana
- Sue Nicholls - Gloria
- Bill Pertwee - Nelson
- John Savident - King Crow
- Ann Way - Mrs Jackson
