= Inn for Trouble =

1960 British film by C. M. Pennington-Richards

- Theatrical release poster
- Directed by: C. M. Pennington-Richards
- Written by: Fred Robinson
- Produced by: Ted Lloyd
- Starring: Peggy Mount; David Kossoff; Leslie Phillips; Charles Hawtrey
- Cinematography: Eric Cross
- Edited by: Tom Simpson
- Music by: Philip Green
- Production companies: Hyams and Lloyd Productions (as Film Locations)
- Distributed by: Eros Films (UK)
- Release date: February 1960
- Running time: 90 min
- Country: United Kingdom
- Language: English

Inn for Trouble is a 1960 black and white British comedy film directed by C.M. Pennington-Richards and starring Peggy Mount, David Kossoff and Leslie Phillips. It was written by Fred Robinson and was a spin-off of the ITV sitcom The Larkins (1958–1964). The film is notable for the final credited appearances of Graham Moffatt and A. E. Matthews.

== Plot ==
The Larkin family takes over a run-down country public house, "The Earl Osbourne". The pub has a resident young French artist, Yvette. Meanwhile a property developer wants to buy the pub to knock it down to build a brand new "roadhouse" instead. He sends his nephew Percy to investigate.

The family's efforts to rejuvenate business are impeded by the long-standing tradition of free beer being distributed by the local Earl. They try to trick people in with the same promise of free beer. Meanwhile Percy Pirbright continually tries to catch the pub out by dragging the local policeman along to observe alleged breaches of the law, without success.

A natural spring erupts in the cellar causing a flooding problem. However, they are finally offered a generous £20,000 for the pub and they also sell the formula for their own beer, the secret ingredient being the spring water.

== Cast ==
- Peggy Mount as Ada Larkin
- David Kossoff as Alf Larkin
- Leslie Phillips as John Belcher
- Glyn Owen as Lord Bill Osborne
- Yvonne Monlaur as Yvette Dupres
- A. E. Matthews as Sir Hector Gore-Blandish
- Ronan O'Casey as Jeff Rogers
- Shaun O'Riordan as Eddie Larkin
- Alan Wheatley as Harold Gaskin
- Willoughby Goddard as Sergeant Saunders
- Alan Rolfe as Ted
- Gerald Campion as George
- Stanley Unwin as farmer
- Irene Handl as Lily
- Graham Moffatt as Jumbo Gudge
- Charles Hawtrey as Silas Withering
- Esma Cannon as Dolly
- Edward Malin as Old Charlie
- Barbara Mitchell as Hetty Prout
- Graham Stark as Charlie
- Frank Williams as Percy Pirbright
- Eric Sykes as Huntsman (Uncredited)
- Derek Royle as Yokel (Uncredited)

== Critical reception ==
Kine Weekly called Inn for Trouble and the Brian Rix farce And The Same to You (1960) the most popular British double bill at the British box office in 1960.

The Monthly Film Bulletin wrote: "Peggy Mount inevitably dominates this episodic and protracted farce, despite extremely variable material and the slenderest of story lines. Though the general standard of humour is feeble, the film may still prove acceptable to the TV series' doubtless loyal public. A. E. Matthews and Irene Handl have little to do, and Graham Moffatt reappears after what seems like years in order to play a moronic Boy Scout."

In British Sound Films: The Studio Years 1928–1959 David Quinlan rated the film as "mediocre", calling it a: "home-made farce, broad in humour."

Leslie Halliwell said: "Amiable extension of a popular TV series."

The Radio Times Guide to Films gave the film 2/5 stars, writing: "This movie spin-off from The Larkins, the popular sitcom of the late 1950s, moved the family away from 66 Sycamore Street and into a country pub, and that's where the problems begin. One of the series' great strengths was its portrait of a typical urban neighbourhood, populated by familiar characters. A whole new world had to be created here, however, with only Pa and Ma (David Kossoff and Peggy Mount) and Eddie (Shaun O'Riordan) providing continuity. Even the presence of Leslie Phillips and Charles Hawtrey can't make up for the general lifelessness."
