= Barbara Mitchell =

British actress (1929–1977)

- Mitchell in For the Love of Ada (1970)
- Born: Barbara Joy Mitchell; 4 October 1929; Northampton, England
- Died: 9 December 1977 (aged 48); Kingston-upon-Thames, London, England
- Occupation: Actress
- Years active: 1958–1977
- Spouse: Rex Graham (m. 1951)
- Children: 2

Barbara Joy Mitchell (4 October 1929 – 9 December 1977) was an English actress who was a familiar face on British television in the 1960s and 1970s, best known for her work in many classic sitcoms of the period.

== Career ==
Mitchell started out as a stage actress, and gained a foothold in television with a number of appearances in popular shows in the 1960s. In 1970, she got her first leading TV role, as Ruth, the daughter of the title character (Irene Handl) in the comedy For the Love of Ada, which ran for four series and 27 episodes, followed in 1972 by a spin-off film of the same title. At the same time, she was appearing periodically as Mrs. Abbott, the absurdly over-protective mother of would-be tough guy Frankie ("Mummy's little soldier"), in Please Sir! and its sequel The Fenn Street Gang.

She appeared as Isabel Chintz, a tough Australian pop agent, in Superstar, a 1973 episode of The Goodies. In Lizzie Dripping, a BBC children's programme which ran for two series in 1973 and 1975, Mitchell played Patty Arbuckle, the often harassed mother of Penelope (Tina Heath), while her longest-running role came in the Yorkshire Television production Beryl's Lot, 52 episodes over three series between 1973 and 1977, in which she played Vi Tonks, married to Trevor (Tony Caunter) and neighbour and friend to the titular Beryl (Carmel McSharry).

She acted in a series of late 1960s / early 1970s UK TV commercials for dish-washing product Palmolive Liquid, where she played blonde beehived Madge, the beauty salon employee who encouraged customers to dip their fingers into a small bowl of the product to demonstrate how kind it was to hands.

Barbara Mitchell died of breast cancer on December 9, 1977,

== Appearances ==
Films

- 1960: Inn for Trouble – Hetty Prout
- 1963: Ladies Who Do – Rose
- 1971: Please Sir! – Mrs Abbott
- 1972: For the Love of Ada – Ruth Pollitt
- 1976: The Twelve Tasks of Asterix – (English version, voice)
- 1977: What's Up Nurse! – neighbour (final film role)

Television

- 1958-1964: The Larkins – Hetty Prout
- 1959: Emergency Ward 10 – Mrs Garland
- 1960: The Secret Garden – nurse
- 1963: Z-Cars – Mrs Evans
- 1963: Bud – Mrs Chanyne
- 1965–1966: Dixon of Dock Green – Mrs Rudd / Amy Ashton
- 1966: Play of the Week – Tessa Lucas
- 1969: Ours Is a Nice House – Stella Barrington
- 1969: Dombey and Son – MrsmMacStinger
- 1970: Please Sir! – Mrs Abbott
- 1970–1971: For the Love of Ada – Ruth Pollitt
- 1970–1971: The Doctors – Connie Higson
- 1971: Doctor at Large – schoolmistress
- 1971–1973 The Fenn Street Gang – Mrs Abbott
- 1973: The Gordon Peters Show – Mrs M
- 1973: The Goodies – Isabel Chintz
- 1973–1975: Lizzie Dripping – Patty Arbuckle
- 1973–1977: Beryl's Lot – Vi Tonks
- 1974: Funny Ha-Ha – Kate Carter
- 1974: My Name is Harry Worth – Miss Sugget
- 1977: Yanks Go Home – Lady Gertrude

Radio

- 1970: Nude With Violin - Cherry-May Waterton
