= David Kossoff =

British actor (1919–2005)

- Born: 24 November 1919; Hackney, London, England
- Died: 23 March 2005 (aged 85); Hatfield, Hertfordshire, England
- Occupation: Actor
- Years active: 1952–1994
- Spouse: Margaret Jenkins (m. 1947; died 1995)
- Children: 3; including Paul Kossoff

David Kossoff (24 November 1919 – 23 March 2005) was a British actor. In 1954 he won the BAFTA Award for Most Promising Newcomer to Leading Film Roles for his appearance as Geza Szobek in The Young Lovers. He played Alf Larkin in TV sitcom The Larkins and Professor Kokintz in The Mouse that Roared (1959) and its sequel The Mouse on the Moon (1963).

Because of the drug use of his son Paul, former guitarist of blues-rock band Free, later with Back Street Crawler, who subsequently died, he became an anti-drug campaigner. In 1971 he was also actively involved in the Nationwide Festival of Light, an organisation protesting against the commercial exploitation of sex and violence, and advocating the teachings of Christ as the key to re-establishing moral stability in Britain.

== Life and career ==
Kossoff was born in Hackney, London, the youngest of three children, to poor Russian-Jewish parents, Annie (née Shaklovich) and Lewis (Louis) Kossoff (1882–1943). His father was a tailor. His older brother Alec changed his name to Alan Keith. The middle sister was named Sarah Rebecca (Sadie).

He attended the North London Polytechnic, leaving in 1937 to work as a draughtsman and then a furniture designer for a year before becoming an actor.

Kossoff started working in light entertainment on British television in the years following World War II, during which he briefly served in the military. His first stage appearance was at the Unity Theatre in 1942 at the age of 23. He took part in numerous plays and films. He was a Member of the Society of Artists and Designers. In addition to this, he was a Fellow of the Royal Society of Arts.

In 1953, Kossoff played the character Lemuel "Lemmy" Barnet in the British sci-fi radio series Journey into Space.

His best-known television roles were the hen-pecked husband Alf Larkin in The Larkins, first broadcast in 1958, and a Jewish furniture maker in A Little Big Business. Film credits included his role as Soviet diplomat Geza Szobek The Young Lovers (1954 – for which he won a British Academy Film Award as Most Promising Newcomer to Film), A Kid for Two Farthings (1955), his role as Morry in the Oscar-winning The Bespoke Overcoat (1956), Professor Kokintz in The Mouse that Roared (1959), starring Peter Sellers, and its sequel The Mouse on the Moon (1963) with Bernard Cribbins. He played Sigmund Freud's father in Freud: The Secret Passion (1962) with Montgomery Clift in the lead.

He was also well known for his story-telling skills, particularly in reinterpreting the Bible. His best-known book, also a television series, is The Book of Witnesses (1971), in which he turned the Gospels into a series of monologues. He also retold dozens of Old Testament and Apocrypha stories in Bible Stories (1968).

== Personal life ==
He married Margaret (Jennie) Jenkins and had two sons, Paul and Simon. Following the death in 1976 of his son Paul, guitarist with the band Free and later with Back Street Crawler, Kossoff established the Paul Kossoff Foundation which aimed to present the realities of drug addiction to children. Kossoff spent the remainder of his life campaigning against drugs. In the late 1970s and early 1980s, he toured with a one-man stage performance about the death of his son and its effect on the family.

He died in 2005 of liver cancer at age 85. In its obituary, The Scotsman wrote that David Kossoff was "a man of deep convictions and proud of his Jewish origins".

== Filmography ==
- Rookery Nook ('live' TV, 1953) – Harold Twine
- The Good Beginning (1953) – Dealer
- The Young Lovers (1954) – Geza Szobek
- The Angel Who Pawned Her Harp (1954) – Schwartz
- Svengali (1954) – Gecko
- A Kid for Two Farthings (1955) – Avrom Kandinsky
- I Am a Camera (1955) – Minor role
- The Woman for Joe (1955) – Max
- The Bespoke Overcoat (1955, Short) – Morry
- Now and Forever (1956) – Pawnbroker
- 1984 (1956) – Charrington
- Who Done It? (1956) – Zacco
- Wicked as They Come (1956) – Sam Lewis
- The Iron Petticoat (1956) – Anton Antonovich Dubratz
- House of Secrets (1956) – Henryk van de Heide
- Count Five and Die (1957) – Dr. Mulder
- The Dock Brief (1957 BBC-TV film) - Herbert Fowle
- Innocent Sinners (1958) – Vincent
- Indiscreet (1958) – Carl Banks
- The Journey (1959) – Simon Avron
- The Mouse That Roared (1959) – Alfred Kokintz
- Jet Storm (1959) – Dr Bergstein
- The House of the Seven Hawks (1959) – Wilhelm Dekker
- Conspiracy of Hearts (1960) – The Rabbi
- Inn for Trouble (1960) – Alf Larkins
- The Two Faces of Dr. Jekyll (1960) – Ernst Litauer
- Freud: The Secret Passion (1962) – Jacob Freud
- Summer Holiday (1963) – Magistrate
- The Mouse on the Moon (1963) – Professor Kokintz
- Ring of Spies (1964) – Peter Kroger
- One Million Years B.C. (1966) – Narrator (uncredited)
- Three for All (1975) – Airport Passenger
- The London Connection (1979) – Professor Buchinski
- Staggered (1994) – Elderly Man (final film role)

== See also ==
- List of British actors
