= Winning Widows =

British TV comedy series (1961–1962)

- Genre: Sitcom
- Written by: Sidney Green; Richard Hills
- Starring: Peggy Mount; Avice Landone
- Composer: Robert Sharples
- Country of origin: United Kingdom
- Original language: English
- No. of series: 2
- No. of episodes: 13

Production
- Producer: Alan Tarrant
- Running time: 30 minutes
- Production company: Associated Television

Original release
- Network: ITV
- Release: 9 September 1961 – 2 November 1962

Winning Widows is a British television sitcom which first aired on ITV between 1961 and 1962. It stars Peggy Mount and Avice Landone as Martha and Mildred, two widowed sisters who move in together.

Other actors who appeared in the series include Thorley Walters, Carole Shelley, Anthony Sagar, Willoughby Goddard, Harold Goodwin, Hugh Paddick, John Junkin, Davy Kaye, Barbara Hicks, Graham Stark, Joe Melia, Ronnie Stevens, Anneke Wills and Bernard Cribbins.

Only two of the thirteen episodes are known to survive.

== Bibliography ==
- Howard Maxford. Hammer Complete: The Films, the Personnel, the Company. McFarland, 2018.
- Carl Rhodes & Robert Westwood. Critical Representations of Work and Organization in Popular Culture. Routledge, 2007.
