= The Larkins (1958 TV series) =

British TV sitcom (1958–1964)

- Genre: Sitcom
- Created by: Fred Robinson
- Starring: David Kossoff; Peggy Mount; Shaun O'Riordan; Ruth Trouncer; Ronan O'Casey; Barbara Mitchell
- Country of origin: United Kingdom
- Original language: English
- No. of series: 6
- No. of episodes: 40

Production
- Running time: 26 minutes
- Production company: ATV

Original release
- Network: ITV
- Release: 19 September 1958 – 15 October 1960
- Release: 9 November 1963 – 22 August 1964

The Larkins is a British television sitcom which was produced by ATV and broadcast on ITV. It ran for four series between 1958 and 1960. An additional two series (with format changes) ran from 1963 to 1964.

== Plot ==
In the first four series, the family, consisting of Ada Larkins (Peggy Mount), her henpecked husband Alf (David Kossoff), their son Eddie (Shaun O'Riordan), daughter Joyce (Ruth Trouncer) and her ex-GI husband Jeff (Ronan O'Casey), all lived together at 66 Sycamore Street, next door to inquisitive neighbour Hetty Prout (Barbara Mitchell), her husband Sam (George Roderick), and their daughter Myrtle (Hillary Bamberger), who had an occasional fling with Eddie.

In the final two series, it is revealed by Alf to an old mate of his called Charlie, that Sycamore Street has been pulled down. Alf also reveals that Jeff and Joyce are now in America and Eddie has a Government job, "abroad somewhere in one of them far flung outposts". Alf says that he has been retired (or made redundant), by his firm, but received a superannuation, together with a golden handshake and "a bit extra in lieu of notice" and as such he and Ada have pooled their resources and now run a café, where they now also live. They employ Hetty (no mention is made of her husband or daughter, nor is it mentioned where Hetty now lives as she used to be Ada and Alf's neighbour at Sycamore Street and she does not live with them at the cafe). Ada and Alf also had a lodger, Major Osbert Rigby-Soames (retired) (Hugh Paddick), who always tried to avoid paying his rent.

== Cast ==
- Peggy Mount - Ada Larkins
- David Kossoff - Alf Larkins
- Barbara Mitchell - Hetty Prout
- Ronan O'Casey - Jeff Rogers
- Ruth Trouncer - Joyce Rogers
- Shaun O'Riordan - Eddie Larkins
- Hilary Bamberger - Myrtle Prout
- Hugh Paddick - Osbert Rigby-Soames
- George Roderick - Sam Prout
- David Jackson - Lofty
- Barbara Hicks - Miss Finch, Fiona Finch
- John Barrard - George
- Derek Benfield - Mr. Burlington Thrush, 3rd Barrister
- Frank Williams - Artist

== Spin-offs ==
=== Comic strip ===
The Larkins was adapted into a gag-a-day comic in 1960 by Dutch comics artist Alfred Mazure, published in the Sunday Graphic.

=== Film ===
The series was adapted into a film, Inn for Trouble (1960) directed by C.M. Pennington-Richards.

== Episode list ==
Unlike many other British sitcoms of the era, all episodes still exist.

Series	Episodes	Originally released	
Series	Episodes	First released	Last released
1	7	19 September 1958	26 December 1958
2	6	2 February 1959	9 March 1959
3	6	8 February 1960	14 March 1960
4	6	10 September 1960	15 October 1960
5	8	9 November 1963	28 December 1963
6	7	11 July 1964	22 August 1964

=== Series 1 (1958) ===
No. overall	No. in series	Title	Original release date
1	1	"Wide Open House"	19 September 1958
2	2	"Gun In-Law"	26 September 1958
3	3	"Catastrophe, aka Cat Happy"	3 October 1958
4	4	"Angry Young Man"	10 October 1958
5	5	"Telly Ho!"	17 October 1958
6	6	"Ale and Farewell"	24 October 1958
7	7	"Christmas with the Larkins"	26 December 1958

=== Series 2 (1959) ===
No. overall	No. in series	Title	Original release date
8	1	"Strictly Commercial"	2 February 1959
9	2	"Teddy For Eddie"	9 February 1959
10	3	"Haul for One"	16 February 1959
11	4	"Gift Horse Power"	23 February 1959
12	5	"Total Welfare"	2 March 1959
13	6	"Very Important Parent"	9 March 1959

=== Series 3 (1960) ===
No. overall	No. in series	Title	Original release date
14	1	"Home Win"	8 February 1960
15	2	"All the Answers"	15 February 1960
16	3	"A Fiddle in Froth"	22 February 1960
17	4	"Come Cleaner"	29 February 1960
18	5	"Stranger than Fiction"	7 March 1960
19	6	"Operation Neighbour"	14 March 1960

=== Series 4 (1960) ===
No. overall	No. in series	Title	Original release date
20	1	"Unlucky Strike"	10 September 1960
21	2	"Little Big Brother"	17 September 1960
22	3	"Gambling Fever"	24 September 1960
23	4	"Frightful Nightful"	1 October 1960
24	5	"Match and Scratch"	8 October 1960
25	6	"Well Turned Worm"	15 October 1960

=== Series 5 (1963) ===
No. overall	No. in series	Title	Original release date
26	1	"Café Ole"	9 November 1963
27	2	"Teenage Terror"	16 November 1963
28	3	"Darts & Flowers"	23 November 1963
29	4	"Help Unwanted"	30 November 1963
30	5	"Beatle Drive"	7 December 1963
31	6	"Trading Stampede"	14 December 1963
32	7	"Strained Relation"	21 December 1963
33	8	"Saloon Barred"	28 December 1963

=== Series 6 (1964) ===
No. overall	No. in series	Title	Original release date
34	1	"Think Quicker, Vicar"	11 July 1964
35	2	"Celebration Blues"	18 July 1964
36	3	"Gypsy’s Warning"	25 July 1964
37	4	"Minder’s Keepers"	1 August 1964
38	5	"Counter Attraction"	8 August 1964
39	6	"Dizzy Rich"	15 August 1964
40	7	"Country Style"	22 August 1964

== DVD ==
All six series have been released on DVD, and were included in a boxset by Network, released on 1 October 2012.

Overview
Title	Release date (Region 2)	No. of discs	BBFC rating	Ref.
The Complete First Series	27 July 2009	1	PG	
The Complete Second Series	12 April 2010	1	PG	
The Complete Third Series	4 October 2010	1	U	
The Complete Fourth Series	21 February 2011	1	U	
The Complete Fifth Series	2 April 2012	2	PG	
The Complete Sixth Series	24 September 2012	1	PG	
Family Album (complete series)	1 October 2012	7	PG	

Note: three episodes have been re-rated 12 by the BBFC in 2021 and 2022; the episodes were series 1, episode 6 for "frequent obscured strong language", series 2, episode 2 for "domestic abuse", and series 2, episode 3 for "moderate violence, bloody images, brief threat".

== Broadcast ==
In 2023 the UK vintage film/nostalgia channel Talking Pictures TV announced that it would be broadcasting the series weekly from 26 March.
