= Behind the Camera: The Unauthorized Story of Three's Company =

- Melanie (Joyce), Jud (Suzanne) and Bret (John)
- Written by: Elisa Bell
- Directed by: Jason Ensler
- Starring: Joyce DeWitt; Daniel Roebuck; Wallace Langham; Bret Anthony; Melanie Paxson; Jud Tylor; Christopher Shyer; Brian Dennehy
- Narrated by: Joyce DeWitt
- Music by: Adam Cohen
- Country of origin: United States
- Original language: English

Production
- Producer: Stanley M. Brooks
- Cinematography: Brian Pearson
- Editor: Sandra Montiel
- Running time: 84 minutes

Original release
- Network: NBC
- Release: May 12, 2003

Behind the Camera: The Unauthorized Story of Three's Company is a 2003 American made-for-television comedy-drama film made by NBC, documenting the success of the sitcom Three's Company, as well as the interpersonal conflicts that occurred among its staff and cast. Former Three's Company cast member Joyce DeWitt served as co-producer and host.

== Cast ==
- Joyce DeWitt as herself
- Daniel Roebuck as Ted Bergmann
- Wallace Langham as Jay Bernstein
- Bret Anthony as John Ritter
- Melanie Paxson as Joyce DeWitt
- Jud Tylor as Suzanne Somers
- Christopher Shyer as Alan Hamel
- Gregg Binkley as Don Knotts
- Gary Hudson as Tony Thomopoulos
- David Lewis as Ira Denmark
- Jason Schombing as Richard Kline
- Terence Kelly as Norman Fell
- Barbara Gordon as Audra Lindley
- Michael David Simms as Don Taffner
- Brian Dennehy as Fred Silverman
- Liz Crawford as Jenilee Harrison
- Anne Ross as Priscilla Barnes

== Plot ==
The movie jumps from the second season to the fifth, covering the time when conflict arose between the producers and cast versus Suzanne Somers and her management, which sought greater visibility and more money for Somers. It then jumps to season eight to cover the end of the series. The original script focused more heavily on the negative side of the production of the show before Joyce DeWitt's involvement added focus on the good times. DeWitt was helped by John Ritter, who saw the final cut of the movie before he died. Suzanne Somers was also contacted and gave some input. Somers and DeWitt were not on speaking terms with one another during the production or promotion of the film. In fact, they did not speak with each other until a February 2012 discussion on Somers' Internet show.

Date	Event
November 1975	American producer Donald L. Taffner and partner Ted Bergmann try to sell the idea to make an American version of the Thames Television show in the UK Man About the House to various TV stations.
January 1976	New ABC programming chief Fred Silverman looks for a risque television show and finds Three's Company.
January 28, 1977	Taping of the first show.
March 15, 1977	First broadcast.
May 1977	First season wrap party.
November 1977	Somers asks Jay Bernstein to manage her career and try to make her the next Farrah Fawcett.
February 1979	Somers tries to get a new deal with CBS for her own show.
July 1979	While filming Nothing Personal, Somers calls Bernstein to fire him.
October 1980	Alan Hamel, now managing Somers' career, attempts deal with ABC to boost Somers' salary by 500%.
October 21, 1980	Somers fakes a cracked rib and misses the taping.
November 2, 1980	Somers misses her second taping.
November 9, 1980	Somers misses her third taping.
November 20, 1980	Producers make Somers tape separately from the rest of the cast for the first time. Her character Chrissy is then usually seen talking on the phone to Jack or Janet from another location.
January 18, 1981	Somers appears on The Phil Donahue Show.
March 1981	Somers receives a threat of possible legal action against her from ABC about using the Chrissy character in a Las Vegas act.
April 2, 1981	Somers is fired from ABC.
May 1982	Because of the ABC legal threat, Somers learns that her CBS deal is canceled because the use of the Chrissy character may also bring legal action against CBS.
November 1983	Hamel fails to convince the producers that Suzanne would be perfect to play Jack Tripper's wife in the Three's a Crowd spin-off.
February 17, 1984	Final taping of the show.

== Events discrepancies ==
The movie presents multiple inaccuracies:

- The show's title Three's Company was coined by Gary Markowitz, one of the first two writers who wrote the pilot. However, the producers use this name while pitching the show to the networks, long before the pilot was made.
- After Suzanne Somers was cast, it seems as if the three actors are meeting for the first time on the night of the taping when they should have spent a week of rehearsals together.
- Suzanne mentions to John and Joyce during a rehearsal that she had her 11-year-old son when she was 17. Her son Bruce Jr. was born on November 8, 1965 and that actually means she had him when she was 19 since she was born on October 16, 1946. Also, if what she first said was true, it would have meant that the current year would have been 1974 or 1975, and Three's Company did not start until 1977.
- At the same time Suzanne misses the first day of taping, Ted Bergmann tells Don Taffner that Fred Silverman has "jumped ship to NBC". Actually, Silverman left for NBC in January 1978, long before the Suzanne contract renegotiation problems began in October 1980.
- During the first season wrap party, everyone seems to know the show is a big hit. However, all six episodes of the first season were taped before the show premiered. Nobody could have known how well the show would be received.
- The episode Suzanne first missed the taping of was "And Justice For Jack". Suzanne's lines were rewritten for Don Knotts.
- After the missed tapings, we see the actors receiving a blue and a pink copy of the scripts; one if Suzanne shows up and one if she does not. When Suzanne comes in the room, she receives both copies as well. She should have only been given the copy with her in it, not both of them.
- After the producers proposed the spinoff to Audra Lindley and Norman Fell, it actually took Norman Fell at least six months to sign on. In the movie, he agrees in less than two minutes.
- As a narrator of the movie, Joyce DeWitt says that Three's Company was filmed on Fridays, something Jenilee Harrison confirmed. However, Taffner and Ritter are said to hold the audition for Jack's fiancée on a Friday when Joyce suddenly comes in. Taffner asks her "What are you doing here?" to which she replies "I like to come in the day before and set up my dressing room", which would mean the show would tape on Saturdays, which is inaccurate.
- The shows were taped on Fridays and the dates that are said to be when Somers missed the tapings of the show are Tuesday (October 21, 1980) and Sundays (November 2 and 9, 1980).
- The Three's a Crowd spinoff was not developed until after season eight began and the ratings started to fall. In the film, John Ritter was proposed the idea right after season seven ended.
- Vicky is stated to be Jack's fiancée, yet she turned down Jack's proposal in the Three's Company series finale, and became his girlfriend/live-in roommate.
- In the movie, Jack turns off the light and closes the door to apartment 291. In the actual series finale, Terri is the one who turns off the light, and the door has the number 201. Additionally, in the movie, Terri is shown dressed in a white nurse's uniform. In the final episode, however, Terri wore a light blue blouse and matching shorts.
- Somers is depicted as being ready to promote the exercise device the ThighMaster in the early 1980s, when in fact she did not start promoting the product until 1991. Also in 1991, Somers began a highly successful six-year run on a new ABC sitcom called Step by Step - a fact which the movie omits altogether.

== Reviews ==
"Considering it was executive produced by DeWitt, it’s no surprise that the pic comes off as one big dig at [cast member Suzanne] Somers," Variety wrote. They also called DeWitt's appearance at the beginning and end of the film "a constant reminder of just how one-sided this gripe really is," describing the movie as "probably far from accurate" and pointing out that it was broadcast by NBC (while describing the struggles of an ABC show).
