= William Cort =

American actor (1936–1993)

William "Bill" Cort
- Publicity Photo of William Cort
- Born: William Phelps Greer III; July 8, 1936; El Paso, Texas, United States
- Died: September 23, 1993 (aged 57); Los Angeles, California, United States
- Occupation: Actor
- Years active: 1963–1993

William Phelps Greer III (July 8, 1936 – September 23, 1993), credited as William Cort and Bill Cort, was an American actor.

Cort appeared on several television shows. His most notable is Dusty's Trail from the early 1970s. He appeared on several other series including: Window on Main Street, Combat!, The F.B.I., Little House on the Prairie, Family Ties, Starsky & Hutch, The Dukes of Hazzard, The Ropers, Lou Grant, ‘’The Montefuscos’’,One Day at a Time, The Practice, Dynasty, Hart to Hart, Three's Company, Hazel, The Golden Girls, The Bradys, Empty Nest, Dallas, Three's a Crowd, Murder, She Wrote, and Growing Pains, among many others. He appeared in Elvira: Mistress of the Dark and Heathers in 1988, and 1990's Ghost, starring Patrick Swayze and Demi Moore. He died at the age of 57 in 1993 of cancer.

== Filmography ==
Year	Title	Role	Notes
1964	Dear Heart	Jerry	
1966	A Big Hand for the Little Lady	Arthur	Uncredited
1967	Banning	Tony	
1972	Glass Houses	Man eating apple at civic meeting	
1976	Alex & the Gypsy	Public Defender	
1977	Sammy	Phil Clemmons	
1983	Hart to Hart	Mark Braverman	
1983	Flicks	Middle Man	(segment 'New Adventures of the Great Galaxy')
1983	Three's Company	Mr. Sneef	Season 7, Episode 14: "Going to Pot"
1984	Three's Company	Dr. Porter	Season 8, Episode 16: "Jack's Tattoo"
1984	Three's a Crowd	Lt. Burke	Season 1, Episode 7: "A Matter of Money"
1984	Breakin' 2: Electric Boogaloo	Howard Howard	
1988	Elvira: Mistress of the Dark	Lawyer / Game Show Host	
1988	Heathers	Veronica's Dad	
1990	Ghost	Bank Co-Worker	
1990	Navy SEALs	Elliott West	
