= The Ropers =

American sitcom (1979–1980)

- Based on: George and Mildred by Johnnie Mortimer and Brian Cooke
- Developed by: Don Nicholl; Michael Ross; Bernie West
- Starring: Norman Fell; Audra Lindley; Jeffrey Tambor; Patricia McCormack; Evan Cohen
- Theme music composer: Joe Raposo
- Country of origin: United States
- Original language: English
- No. of seasons: 2
- No. of episodes: 28

Production
- Production locations: CBS Television City; Hollywood, California
- Running time: 30 minutes
- Production company: The NRW Company

Original release
- Network: ABC
- Release: March 13, 1979 – May 15, 1980

Related
- Three's Company; George and Mildred

The Ropers is an American sitcom television series that aired on ABC from March 13, 1979, to May 15, 1980. It is a spin-off of Three's Company and loosely based on the British sitcom George and Mildred, which was itself a spin-off of Man About the House, on which Three's Company was based.

It was taped at CBS Television City in the Fairfax District of Los Angeles, where its parent series, Three's Company, was taping at the time, from February to April 1979 (Season 1) and from July 1979 to February 1980 (Season 2).

== Plot ==
The series focused on couple Stanley (Norman Fell) and Helen Roper (Audra Lindley), who were landlords to Jack, Janet and Chrissy on Three's Company.

In this spin-off, the Ropers have sold their apartment building (in the Three's Company episode "An Anniversary Surprise" [season 3, episode 20]) to live in the upmarket community of Cheviot Hills, where the social-climbing Helen struggles to fit in with her neighbors. Stanley makes little attempt to fit in with the standards of the community, thereby causing Helen much embarrassment.

As was the case during their time on Three's Company, the opening credits for The Ropers alternate between Audra Lindley and Norman Fell being credited first.

== Characters ==
=== Main characters ===
- Stanley Roper (Norman Fell) —A lower-middle-class, frugal, and often embarrassing retiree, who moved to Cheviot Hills after he is duped into buying a townhouse
- Helen Roper (Audra Lindley) —A sexually frustrated, social-climbing middle-aged woman who tries to fit into the community despite her husband Stanley's constant boorishness. Despite her attempts to fit in, she often proves herself to be as bumbling as her husband.
- Jeffrey P. Brookes III (Jeffrey Tambor) —The snobbish realtor who is also the Ropers' next-door neighbor.
- Anne Brookes (Patricia McCormack) —Brookes' long-suffering, down-to-earth homemaker wife, who looks after the house and their young son David. She and Helen become friendly, despite their husbands' frequently adversarial relationship with one another.
- David Brookes (Evan Cohen) —Jeffrey and Anne Brookes' 7-year-old son who is always tempted to bother Mr. Roper, which his father doesn't approve of.

=== Recurring characters ===
- Jenny Ballinger (Louise Vallance) (season 2)—A young woman who had been living in the Ropers' storeroom
- Ethel Ambrewster (Dena Dietrich) —Helen's snobby elder sister; gives Helen an air kiss every time she sees her.
- Hubert Ambrewster (Rod Colbin)—Ethel's husband and Helen's brother-in-law
- Debbie Hopper (Lois Areno) —The girl Stanley sees at the hot tub in the neighborhood
- Joey (Richard B. Shull) —Stanley's best friend and one of Helen's enemies
- Hilda (Lucy Lee Flippin/Darcy Pulliam) (season 2)—Helen's sister who has five children and one on the way with her husband, "Fertile" Freddy
- Mother (Lucille Benson) —The mother of Helen, Hilda, and Ethel.

== Creation ==
After the enormous success of Three's Company in its short first season in 1977, ABC head Fred Silverman was anxious to capitalize on the show's success. In early 1977, Silverman approached Fell and Lindley with the subject of doing a spin-off from the show after its first full season wrapped in the spring of 1978. Both actors as well as the Three's Company producers backed off as the show had yet to prove itself for an entire season. With the show's continued success in its second season, however, the idea was brought up again in 1978, this time by Three's Company's own producers as well as new ABC head Tony Thomopolous (Silverman had gone to NBC). The idea intrigued Lindley, but Fell was extremely reluctant, as he was satisfied with his role on a show that was already a proven hit. Fell feared that a spin-off would be unsuccessful and thus put him out of a good role and a job. To alleviate his fears, Three's Company producers contractually promised Fell that they would give the new series a year to prove itself. If the show were to be canceled prior to that time, then he would return to Three's Company. A reluctant Fell agreed to the new terms. Unlike her on-screen husband, Audra Lindley did not request such a clause.

Like Three's Company, The Ropers was introduced as a late season replacement series in the spring of 1979 premiering the same night as Three's Company on ABC's successful Tuesday night lineup, airing at 10 pm. In its first season, the ratings for the show were very high (the show finished at number 8 for the 1978–79 season), and had the second-highest series premiere rating at the time. After the season premiere, Three's Company went on hiatus, but The Ropers still did well. ABC reran the episodes over the summer of 1979 (in August on Sundays) where they continued to achieve high ratings leading many to believe that the series would enjoy a long run.

== Cancellation ==
At the beginning of the 1979–80 season, ABC moved the show to Saturdays at 8 pm, resulting in an audience drop that put it near the bottom of the ratings. Being placed on Saturday nights, rather than on the ABC Tuesday night lineup, caused an immediate fall into the bottom ten (number 52 out of 61 shows for the week of September 17–23, its second week of the season) as the show was in direct competition with the NBC show CHiPs. The show later moved to 8:30 pm on Saturdays by January 1980. The move upset Fell to the point that he actually went to ABC headquarters in New York to plead with the network to move the show to a better time slot. His effort was in vain, however, and the show continued to pull in low ratings. The drop in ratings and the fact that the show was not pulling in the key young demographic audience led to announcement of the show's cancellation by ABC in May 1980. The last three episodes aired Thursdays at 9:30 pm after Barney Miller in May 1980. Audra Lindley stated in Chris Mann's 1997 book about Three's Company that she was surprised that The Ropers had been cancelled after a late-season surge in the series ratings had allowed it to finish the 1979–80 season at number 25; the Nielsen ratings for that year, however, list the series Soap at number 25.

With the series canceled, Fell approached Three's Company producers about Mr. Roper returning to the show. However, during the time The Ropers was on the air, the landlord character role had been filled on Three's Company by Ralph Furley, played by Don Knotts. The addition had worked well and Three's Company had retained its popularity. The idea of returning Fell, and potentially Lindley, to the original Three's Company position was undesirable to producers and ABC, mainly because they had one character playing the landlord role now as opposed to two, which would require more money to be paid out per episode. The cancellation of The Ropers came just as Suzanne Somers began to renegotiate her contract, which would lead to her very public contract dispute during the 1980–81 television season and her departure from the series, and just one month after the one-year contractual deadline had passed. Fell would later state that he always believed the decision to pull the plug on the show had been made much earlier, but that the network deliberately postponed making the cancellation official until after the one-year mark specifically to be relieved of the obligation to allow him to return to Three's Company. There was an attempt by producers to sell the show to Silverman over at NBC; Silverman, however, passed on it too.

Despite the hard feelings, in March 1981 both Fell and Lindley made one final guest appearance on Three's Company (in Season 5, Episode #18 "Night of The Ropers") nearly a year after the end of their own series before the characters were retired for good. For audiences, it was a chance to see all of the three landlord characters – played by Fell, Lindley, and Knotts – on the same stage.

Tambor appeared on Three's Company that same season playing a different character, a wealthy but unwelcome suitor of Chrissy's cousin Cindy (Season 5, Episode #13). Tambor also made other guest appearances on Three's Company, portraying different characters.

The show was included in Time magazine's "Top 10 Worst TV Spin-Offs".

In July 2002, TV Guide named The Ropers the 49th worst TV series of all time.

== Proposed spin-off ==
In 1986, distributor D. L. Taffner revealed its plans for a spin-off of The Ropers called Three Apartments. The spin-off would again star Fell and Lindley, this time as landlords of a three-unit apartment building. The show was offered as either a two-year, 44-episode package in syndication starting April 1987, or as a 52-episode package on NBC-owned station checkerboards beginning in September 1987. Guest stars would include John Ritter, Joyce DeWitt, Richard Kline and Don Knotts from Three's Company; Robert Mandan from Three's a Crowd; and Jim J. Bullock and Nancy Dussault from Too Close for Comfort/The Ted Knight Show. Three Apartments was to replace The Ted Knight Show, a fellow Taffner-distributed show that ended production after the death of show namesake Ted Knight in August 1986. The spin-off was withdrawn in January 1987 because of a glut of syndicated sitcom offerings, a lack of time slots, and a difficult advertising market.

== Episodes ==
Season	Episodes	Originally released	
Season	Episodes	First released	Last released
1	6	March 13, 1979	April 17, 1979
2	22	September 15, 1979	May 18, 1980

=== Season 1 (1979) ===
No. overall	No. in season	Title	Directed by	Written by	Original release date
1	1	"Moving On"	Dave Powers	Brian Cooke & Johnnie Mortimer	March 13, 1979
Helen bugs Stanley into finally looking for a new house. Stanley, however, wants to buy a mobile home. This episode is sometimes included in Three's Company syndication as an additional episode. Based on the episode of the same name by Johnnie Mortimer and Brian Cooke
2	2	"Friends and Neighbors"	Dave Powers	Brian Cooke & Johnnie Mortimer	March 20, 1979
Stanley embarrasses Helen when he locks himself outside of their house in nothing but his bathrobe while she's attending a posh party next door. Guest stars: Roger Bowen as James, Rick Garcia as Locksmith, Jean Gillespie as Margaret, and Tom Pedi as Moving Man. Based on "The Bad Penny" by Johnnie Mortimer and Brian Cooke
3	3	"Your Money or Your Life"	Dave Powers	Brian Cooke & Johnnie Mortimer	March 27, 1979
Stanley thinks he's dying when test results from his doctor don't come right away. Guest stars: Marilyn Borden as Hetty, Rosalyn Borden as Betty, Hope Clarke as Dr. Young, Mickey Deems as Uncle Bert, Jane Dulo as Kate Morgan, John Fiedler as Bill Marsh, Lois Hamilton as Marilyn Graham (credited as Lois Areno), and Jillian Kesner as Linda Graham. Based on the episode of the same name by Johnnie Mortimer and Brian Cooke
4	4	"The Doris Letters"	Dave Powers	Brian Cooke & Johnnie Mortimer	April 3, 1979
Helen takes Stanley to a marriage counselor after finding many love letters written by him for another woman. Guest Stars: Don Chastain as Keith and Alice Hirson as Mrs. Eastham. Based on "The Dorothy Letters" by Johnnie Mortimer and Brian Cooke
5	5	"The Family Planning"	Dave Powers	Brian Cooke & Johnnie Mortimer	April 10, 1979
Stanley gets upset when Helen's mother and sister Ethel visit, and he thinks that her mother has plans to stay with them permanently. Guest Stars: Lucille Benson as Mother, Rod Colbin as Hubert Armbrewster, Dena Dietrich as Ethel Armbrewster, and Lucy Lee Flippin as Hilda. Based on the episode of the same name by Johnnie Mortimer and Brian Cooke
6	6	"Opportunity Knocks"	Dave Powers	Brian Cooke & Johnnie Mortimer	April 17, 1979
Larry Dallas visits and tries to sell Stanley a mobile home. This idea excites him and the always devious Jeffrey. Stanley almost buys it without telling Helen. Guest Stars: William Cort as Mr. Williams, Lois Hamilton as Marilyn Graham (credited as Lois Areno), Richard Kline as Larry Dallas, Cooper Neal as Councilman Clifford, Nancy Priddy as Mrs. Clifford, and Mary-Robin Redd as Mrs. Williams. Based on the episode of the same name by Johnnie Mortimer and Brian Cooke

=== Season 2 (1979–80) ===
No. overall	No. in season	Title	Directed by	Written by	Original release date
7	1	"The Party"	Jack Shea	George Burditt	September 15, 1979
Helen complains about never getting to take a vacation. To keep her quiet, Stanley prepares a secret disco birthday party with the aid of his former tenants Jack Tripper, Janet Wood, and Chrissy Snow. This episode is sometimes included in Three's Company syndication as "Stanley, the Ladies' Man". Guest Stars: Joyce DeWitt as Janet Wood, John Ritter as Jack Tripper, Suzanne Somers as Chrissy Snow.
8	2	"Days of Beer and Rosie"	Jack Shea	Martin Rips & Joseph Staretski	September 22, 1979
A man shows up at the condo and introduces himself as Stanley's son from an affair years ago. The Brookes want to send their son, David, to a private school. Guest Stars: Peggy Converse as Mrs. Hollingsworth, Squire Fridell as Bill, and Vernon Weddle as Ernest Grimes. Based on the episode of the same name by Johnnie Mortimer and Brian Cooke
9	3	"Power Play"	Jack Shea	Martin Rips & Joseph Staretski	September 29, 1979
When the electricity to the Ropers' house is cut off and Helen's sister is supposed to come for dinner, Stanley "borrows" electricity from the Brookes. Guest Stars: Rod Colbin as Hubert Armbrewster, Dena Dietrich as Ethel Armbrewster, and Cliff Norton as Don Webster. Based on "The Unkindest Cut of All" by Johnnie Mortimer and Brian Cooke
10	4	"Baby Talk"	Jack Shea	George Burditt	October 6, 1979
Stanley fears that Helen will ignore him if they adopt a child. When a social worker says they're too old to adopt, he raises her spirits by giving her a puppy, Muffin. Guest Stars: Beverly Dixon as Hortense Bell, Lois Hamilton as Debbie Hopper (credited as Lois Areno), Missy Howard as Little Girl, and Henry Sutton as Reverend Munson (listed in final credits as 'Reverend Sutton'). Based on the episode of the same name by Johnnie Mortimer and Brian Cooke
11	5	"Two for the Road"	Jack Shea	Story by : Martin Rips & Joseph Staretski and Wayne Kline; Teleplay by : Martin Rips & Joseph Staretski	October 13, 1979
Stanley and Jeffrey get drunk and are arrested, after both have arguments with their respective spouses. Guest Stars: Richard Christie as Officer Hibbs (credited as Dick Christie) (final credits show 'Office Hibbs'), Alan Koss as Officer Slade, Art K. Koustik as Bartender (credited as Art Koustik), and Fred Pinkard as Desk Sergeant.
12	6	"Puppy Love"	Jack Shea	Martin Rips & Joseph Staretski	October 20, 1979
Stanley loses their dog and buys another one to try to calm Helen down. Guest Stars: Martin Ferrero as Salesman, Lois Hamilton as Debbie Hopper (credited as Lois Areno), and Sheila Rogers as Customer.
13	7	"All Around the Clock"	Jack Shea	George Burditt	October 27, 1979
On their 23rd wedding anniversary, Stanley buys a fake antique clock that happens to resemble the Brookes' stolen clock. Helen then tries to sneak into their house to return it. Guest Stars: Joey Forman as Officer McNab and Sam McMurray as Charles Remington. Based on the episode of the same name by Johnnie Mortimer and Brian Cooke
14	8	"Odd Couples"	Jack Shea	Mark Fink	November 3, 1979
When Stanley accidentally sets his kitchen on fire, Brookes thinks it's from faulty wiring and lets the Ropers stay with his family. Guest Star: Carleton Carpenter as Roland Calvert.
15	9	"Pal Joey"	Jack Shea	Martin Rips & Joseph Staretski	November 17, 1979
When Stanley gets a new (or so he tells Helen) living room suite from his friend Joey, he finds out the furniture once belonged to Helen's sister, Ethel. Guest Stars: Rod Colbin as Hubert Armbrewster, Dena Dietrich as Ethel Armbrewster, and Richard B. Shull as Joey.
16	10	"Helen Makes Music"	Jack Shea	Stephen Neigher	November 24, 1979
The Brookes and Ropers fight over the commission money Helen gets when she sells one of the townhouses to a buyer, so the Brookes decide to buy her an organ. Guest Star: Matthew Tobin as Donald Carey.
17	11	"The Skeleton"	Jack Shea	Alan Hackney	December 1, 1979
Jeffrey's hobo uncle comes for a visit, much to Jeffrey's embarrassment. Guest Star: Barry Nelson as Uncle Bill.
18	12	"The Other Man"	Jack Shea	George Tricker & Neil Rosen	December 15, 1979
Helen asks the gardener to pose as her "Latin lover" Ramon, in order to make Stanley jealous. Guest stars: Dante D'Andre as Second Man, Jillian Kesner as Linda Graham, Julio Medina as Third Man, and Jay Varela as Mr. Ramirez.
19	13	"And Who's Been Sleeping in My...?"	Jack Shea	Story by : Don Nicholl & Michael Ross & Bernie West and George Burditt & Stephen Neigher; Teleplay by : George Burditt	January 26, 1980
The Ropers find out that an 18-year-old girl has been living in their store room for weeks. Introducing Stevie Vallance as Jenny Ballinger (credited as Louise Vallance).
20	14	"Jenny's Date"	Jack Shea	Martin Rips & Joseph Staretski	February 2, 1980
Stanley pays the Brookes' nephew, Michael, $50 to take Jenny out on a date. Guest Stars: Edward Edwards as Michael Dinkelmann and Stevie Vallance as Jenny Ballinger (credited as Louise Vallance).
21	15	"Of Mice and Horses"	Jack Shea	George Burditt	February 9, 1980
Ethel attempts to retrieve a valuable horse-shaped case, supposedly from the Ming Dynasty, from Helen. Guest Stars: Lucille Benson as Mother, Dena Dietrich as Ethel Armbrewster, and Stevie Vallance as Jenny Ballinger (credited as Louise Vallance). Based on "I Gotta Horse!" by Johnnie Mortimer and Brian Cooke
22	16	"Family Feud"	Jack Shea	Barbara Allyn & Katherine Green	February 16, 1980
The Ropers and Brookes feud on David and Helen's birthday. Guest Star: Stevie Vallance as Jenny Ballinger (credited as Louise Vallance).
23	17	"The Other Woman"	Jack Shea	Stephen Neigher	March 1, 1980
Helen is convinced Stanley is having an affair, when she sees him give a locket to another woman. Guest Stars: Jordan Charney as Mr. McLaughlin, Lola Mason as Lucille Pomeroy, Paul Valentine as Maitre'D, and Stevie Vallance as Jenny Ballinger (credited as Louise Vallance).
24	18	"Men About the House"	Jack Shea	Martin Rips & Joseph Staretski	March 8, 1980
After Helen volunteers Stanley to babysit David on poker night, he takes him to a game. Guest Star: Richard B. Shull as Joey.
25	19	"Old Flames"	Jack Shea	Martin Rips & Joseph Staretski	March 15, 1980
Stanley is jealous when Helen's old USO boyfriend wants to see her and makes himself a date with an old girlfriend. Guest Stars: Lucille Benson as Mother, James T. Callahan as Tom Cummins (credited as James Callahan), Mickey Deems as Drunk, Joe George as Bartender, Gloria LeRoy as Gloria Mealy, and Stevie Vallance as Jenny Ballinger (credited as Louise Vallance).
26	20	"The Rummage Sale"	Jack Shea	George Burditt	May 1, 1980
Stanley's men's magazines are accidentally donated to a church rummage sale. Guest Stars: Edward Grover as Reverend Harper and Stevie Vallance as Jenny Ballinger (credited as Louise Vallance). Based on "Jumble Pie" by Johnnie Mortimer and Brian Cooke
27	21	"Four Letter Word"	Jack Shea	George Burditt	May 8, 1980
When Stanley goes over to his brother-in-law Hubert's office to get a job, he finds two tickets for Hubert and his secretary to Acapulco. Guest Stars: Timothy Blake as Louise Cooper, Rod Colbinas Hubert Armbrewster, Dena Dietrich as Ethel Armbrewster, and Stevie Vallance as Jenny Ballinger (credited as Louise Vallance). Based on the episode of the same name by Johnnie Mortimer and Brian Cooke
28	22	"Mother's Wake"	Jack Shea	George Burditt	May 15, 1980
Helen's mother holds a wake at the Ropers' house to discuss her will, complete with presents. Guest Stars: Lucille Benson as Mother, Dena Dietrich as Ethel Armbrewster, Lois Hamilton as Debbie Hopper (credited as Lois Areno), Darcy Pulliam as Hilda, Henry Sutton as Reverend Munson, and Stevie Vallance as Jenny Ballinger (credited as Louise Vallance).

=== Home media ===
On December 22, 2023, VEI released a special 40th anniversary box set of Three's Company that also includes all episodes of The Ropers and Three's a Crowd.

In September 2024, VEI reissued the complete series in a separate standalone set entitled: The Ropers: The Complete Series.

== Syndication ==
The Ropers was aired in syndication on local channels in the 1980s and early 1990s, but has had limited airings in recent years, likely because, due to its relatively short network run—roughly a season-and-a-half—there are not enough episodes to strip the show. Two episodes of the series, however, play in the syndication package of Three's Company. When initially offered in syndication, the series ran under the title Three's Company's Friends, The Ropers. That version used an instrumental version of the original series' theme song. Six episodes of the series were aired on TV Land in September 2006, and four episodes were aired on WGN America in October 2008.

Beginning in January 2011, Antenna TV, a television network designed for digital television subchannels and owned by Tribune Broadcasting, aired the sitcom. The series started on Tuesday, February 15, 2011, and went through one entire rotation of all episodes before being removed from the lineup. On August 29, 2011, the show returned to the lineup as the Three's Company cycle again came to the point of the series where the Ropers left.

Antenna TV usually shows back-to-back episodes of Three's Company. But when the cycle comes to the point of the Ropers' departure, the network then airs The Ropers following a single episode of Three's Company until the end of the Ropers cycle, then resumes the back-to-back Three's Company airings.

Beginning in 2015, Antenna TV began airing the series on weekends back to back with the other Three's Company spin-off series Three's a Crowd.

The Ropers can currently be seen on Pluto TV channel Classic TV Comedy, Tubi, and Peacock.

== Legacy ==
The International Order of Mrs. Ropers is a nationwide group of local clubs whose members dress as Mrs. Roper or other characters from the series. These "Mrs. Roper Romps" likely began with the Southern Decadence event in New Orleans in 2013. A Tulsa, Oklahoma “Mrs. Roper Romp” on April 25, 2025 held to benefit the homeless following a similar event in Yorba Linda, California. It prominently featured women wearing carrot-red frizzy hairstyles, big glasses, and caftans, similar to the Mrs. Roper character. The theme is said to be based on Mrs. Roper’s warmth, humor and style, embodying bringing people together for a worthy cause.
