= Lois Hamilton =

American actress

- Hamilton in 1980
- Born: Lois Irene Yanessa; October 14, 1943; Philadelphia, Pennsylvania, U.S.
- Died: December 23, 1999 (aged 56); Rio de Janeiro, Brazil
- Other names: Lois Areno; Lois Irene Aurino; Lois Aurino
- Education: Temple University; University of Florence
- Occupations: Model; author; actress; artist; aviator
- Known for: The Cannonball Run; Summer Rental; Stripes

Lois Hamilton (October 14, 1943 – December 23, 1999) was an American model, author, aviator, artist and actress.

== Life and career ==
Lois Hamilton was born Lois Irene Yanessa on October 14, 1943, in Philadelphia, Pennsylvania to Francis Yanessa and Helen. She studied at Temple University in her native Philadelphia before attending the University of Florence in Florence, Italy, where she received degrees in psychology and fine arts.

Her looks brought her an opportunity with the Ford Modeling Agency where she became one of its top models during the 1970s. Hamilton graced the covers of many magazines, including Cosmopolitan, Fortune, Mademoiselle, Vogue Italia, Prevue, Neue Revue Illustrierte, Newsweek, Paris Match, Hello!, Redbook, Ladies' Home Journal, Glamour and Time. Some of her ad campaigns included those for Chanel, Clairol, Halston, Pucci, and Hermès; in all, she appeared in over 150 commercials worldwide during her career.

Hamilton moved to Hollywood, where she made a successful transition from model to actress. Within a year, she landed more TV stints than any other actress at her agency. She worked with such notables as Ivan Reitman, Neil Simon, Sydney Pollack, Robert Redford, Burt Reynolds, John Candy, Roger Moore, Bill Murray, Jane Fonda, Dean Martin, Carl Reiner, David Carradine and Sammy Davis Jr.. Under the name Lois Hamilton or Lois Areno, she appeared in films such as Stripes, The Cannonball Run and Honky Tonk Freeway and on television shows like Card Sharks, The Dukes of Hazzard and Three's Company.

When she was not involved in a feature film or television project, Hamilton took to the skies, where she was a licensed private pilot. She logged over 600 hours in the air and was an aerobatic pilot, flying her 1936 German biplane. Hamilton was also an accomplished sculptor, painter and writer. She exhibited her bronze sculptures and oil paintings in many one-woman shows in Los Angeles.

== Death ==
Hamilton fled the country for Rio de Janeiro, Brazil, rather than face prison time for an accident in which she was involved while driving under the influence. On December 23, 1999, Hamilton locked herself in her hotel room at the Sheraton Hotel in Rio de Janeiro, where she consumed a fatal overdose of sleeping pills. She was 56 years old. She was interred in Valhalla Memorial Park Cemetery in North Hollywood, California.

== Filmography ==
Film
Year	Title	Role	Notes
1972	Last of the Red Hot Lovers	Girl in Car	Credited as Lois Aurino
1975	The Sunshine Boys		Uncredited
1979	The Electric Horseman	Joanna Camden	Credited as Lois Areno
1981	The Cannonball Run	Seymour's Girl	Credited as Lois Areno
1981	Stripes	Stillman's Girlfriend	Credited as Lois Areno
1981	Honky Tonk Freeway		Uncredited
1985	Summer Rental	Vicki Sanders	
1986	Armed Response	Sara Roth	Alternative title: Jade Jungle
2004	Bob's Night Out	Bob's Stepmother	Released posthumously, (final film role)
Television
Year	Title	Role	Notes
1978	Are You in the House Alone?	Policewoman	Television movie Credited as Lois Areno
1978	Starsky & Hutch	Paula	1 episode
1979	Topper	Charlene	Television movie Credited as Lois Areno
1979	CHiPs		1 episode
1979	The Dukes of Hazzard	Carla	1 episode
1978–1981	Three's Company	Rita; Katy Williams	2 episodes Credited as Lois Areno
1979–1980	The Ropers	Debbie Hopper	5 episodes Credited as Lois Areno
1979–1981	Card Sharks	Card Dealer	Credited as Lois Areno
1980	The Love Boat	Angela	1 episode
1982	Pray TV	Bobbi Ellis	Television movie
1983	Starflight: The Plane That Couldn't Land	Millie	Television movie Credited as Lois Areno
1984	Match Game-Hollywood Squares Hour	Herself	
1984	Hart to Hart	Inga	1 episode
1984	Invitation to Hell	Miss Winter	Television movie
1985	Hunter	Ginger Flagg	1 episode
1990	Designing Women	Susan	1 episode
