= Stevie Vallance =

Canadian actress

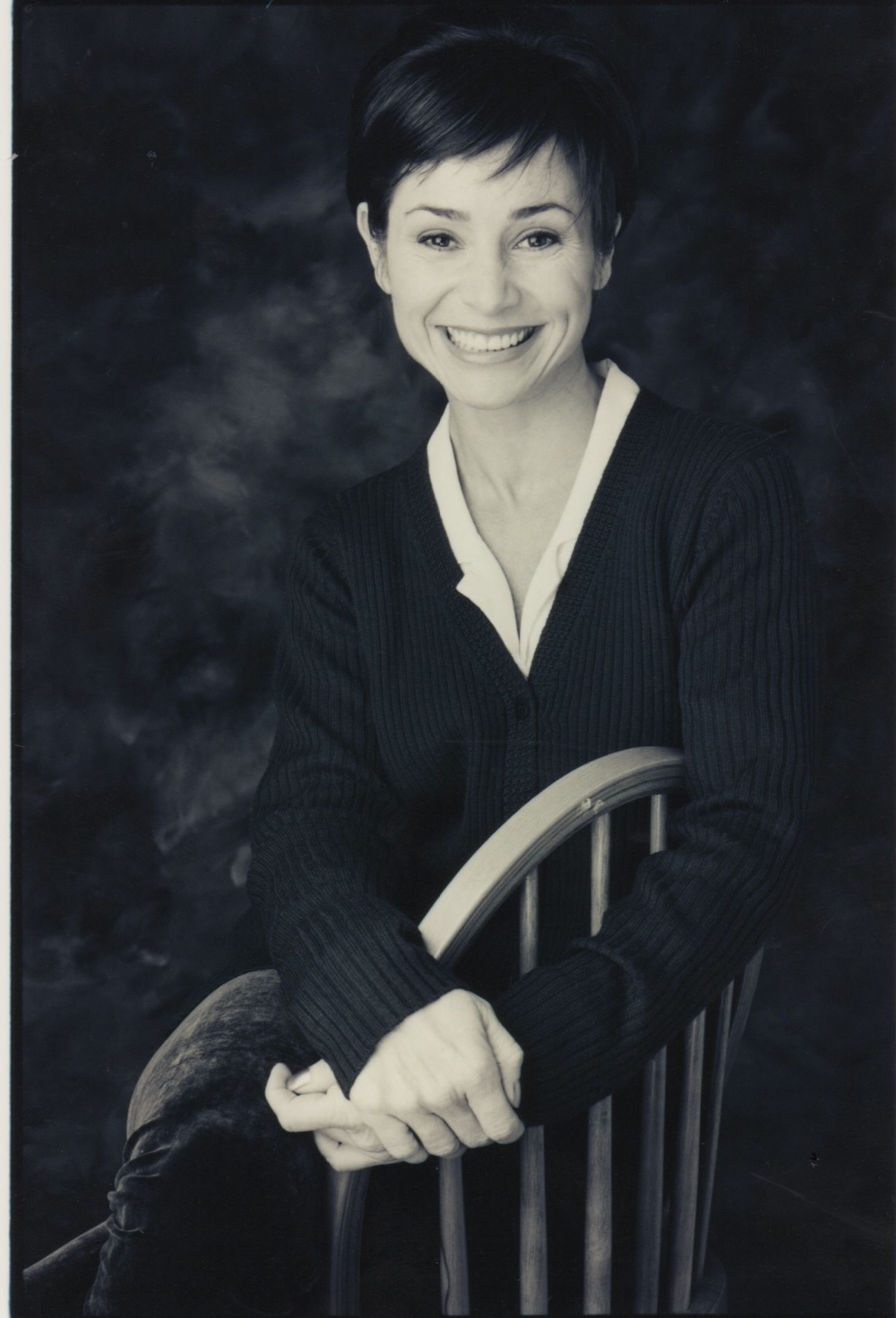
- Vallance circa. 2000
- Born: Stephanie Louise Vallance; September 8, 1958 (age 67); Montreal, Quebec, Canada
- Other names: Louise Vallance; Stevie Louise Vallance
- Occupations: Actress; musician; composer; director
- Years active: 1971–present
- Musical career
- Genres: Pop rock; musical theatre; jazz
- Instrument: Vocals
- Website: www.stevievallance.com

Stephanie Louise Vallance (born September 8, 1958), commonly known as Stevie Vallance, also credited as Louise Vallance during the 1970s–90s, is a Canadian actress and musician who has worked on numerous films and television series, both live-action and animated. Vallance is most recognized as Jenny in The Ropers, Det. Stevie Brody in Night Heat, and Whazzat Kangaroo in Zoobilee Zoo. As a director, she received a Daytime Emmy for voice-directing the music and dialogue on the children's animated series Madeline, in which she also portrayed "Miss Clavel" and "Genevieve".

== Early life and career ==
Montreal-born, Toronto-raised Stephanie Louise Vallance began work as a professional actress at age eleven. At that time she was discovered by Alan Lund, who cast her in the lead role of Adele in the Charlottetown Festival musical production of Jane Eyre, which performed at Toronto's O'Keefe Centre (now the Sony Centre for the Performing Arts). As a teenager, Vallance made numerous television appearances including leading roles on Canadian television networks in King of Kensington; Police Surgeon; The Tommy Hunter Show; Norman Campbell's The Wonder of It All; and A Bird in the House, directed by Allan King.

== Film and television ==
After graduating from the American Academy of Dramatic Arts in New York, she moved to Los Angeles, where David Jacobs cast her as Sylvie in the first two seasons of Knots Landing on CBS before ABC asked her to join the second season of The Ropers as Jenny, the orphaned newspaper ‘boy’ whom Stanley and Helen found living in their attic; with Norman Fell, Audra Lindley, and Jeffrey Tambor.

As an LA-based actor, Vallance guest-starred on multiple network television series including Bosom Buddies, Lou Grant, and L.A. Law. She played Ernest's love interest, Erma Terradiddle in the Jim Varney feature film Slam Dunk Ernest. In Three Men and a Baby, she played Sally, opposite Steve Guttenberg.

In the 1980s and 1990s, Vallance commuted between Los Angeles and Toronto, starring in many US/Canadian co-productions including Poltergeist: The Legacy, The Outer Limits, F/X: The Series, Cobra, First Wave, Dracula: The Series, Forever Knight, and Road to Avonlea, where she was whisked away on a horse by Christopher Reeve. During that time, she was best known for her role as series regular Det. Stevie Brody on the CBS late-night series Night Heat with Scott Hylands, Allan Royal, and Jeff Wincott. She followed that up with a very different sort of role as a pink kangaroo named Whazzat Kangaroo on the Hallmark series Zoobilee Zoo, filmed entirely in California's San Fernando Valley.

== Animation ==
Vallance has done voice acting in many animated television series, including ReBoot (as Mouse and Rocky Raccoon); Donkey Kong Country (as Dixie Kong); Sonic Underground (as the singing voice of Sonia Hedgehog and both singing and speaking voices of Mindy LaTour); Madeline (as Genevieve, Miss Clavel and numerous incidental roles); Gadget Boy (as the villain Spydra); InuYasha (as Jinenji's Mother); Totally Spies! (as the computer G.L.A.D.I.S.); Growing Up Creepie (as Gnat); Care Bears (as Proud Heart Cat); and Care Bears: Journey to Joke-a-lot and The Care Bears' Big Wish Movie (as Share Bear); Care Bears: Adventures in Care-a-Lot (as True Heart Bear); Dennis the Menace (as Alice Mitchell); Dinosaucers (as Princess Dei and Teryx); Lady Lovely Locks (as Duchess Ravenwaves and Maiden Curly Crown); Popples (as Party, Puffball, Prize and Punkity); Bakugan Battle Brawlers, (as Tigrerra and Rabeeder); Silverwing (as Breeze); Nilus the Sandman (as multiple incidental voices) and Cardcaptor Sakura: The Movie (as Yelan Li). Vallance also voiced numerous characters in Don Bluth's animated features, such as Thumbelina and The Pebble and the Penguin.

== Voice direction ==
Vallance has voice-directed more than 500 episodes of children's TV, working with children, actors, sports stars and celebrities. She was a recipient of a Daytime Emmy Award in 2002 for casting and voice-directing her first series, the dialogue and music-vocals on 70 episodes of the children's animated series Madeline for The Disney Channel, wherein she also voiced Miss Clavel and Genevieve. She then went on to voice-direct Silverwing for Bardel Animation Studios, and Totally Spies! for Teletoon Network, in which she voiced G.L.A.D.I.S.. In 2007, she was nominated for her third Emmy for casting and voice-producing the Discovery Kids and Mike Young Productions animated series, Growing Up Creepie. On the 9 Story series Best Ed, Vallance served as voice director on 52 episodes. She then cast and voice-directed the Teletoon Detour pilot Celebutard Nation, which premiered at the 2009 Ottawa International Animation Festival.

From 2011 to 2013, Vallance headed back to Los Angeles to cast and voice-direct two animated series for executive producer Bill Schultz: Guess How Much I Love You for Disney Junior, based on the children's book of the same name by Sam McBratney; and Seasons 1 and 2 of Wild Grinders for Nicktoons, starring skateboard guru Rob Dyrdek. From 2014 to 2017, Vallance was based in Toronto as the Voice Director on Season 1-2 of Corus/Nelvana's action-adventure series Mysticons.

== Teaching ==
Vallance teaches actors how to infuse personality into cartoon characters with her brand name Tooned In! Animation Voice-over Workshops. The first workshop took place in North Vancouver, British Columbia, in 1995. Since then Vallance has taught children and adults how to do cartoon voice-overs in Chicago, New York City, Ottawa, Orlando, Miami, Atlanta, Toronto, Phoenix and Los Angeles. In 2009 and 2010, Vallance taught 400 Animators at the Ottawa International Animation Festival. In late 2010, 400 Animation fans participated in her high-energy ‘one-person panel’ seminar at the New York Comic Con.

== Music ==
In 1995, Vallance moved to Bowen Island, British Columbia where she met Michael Creber (piano; k.d. lang). Together in 1998, they recorded Vallance's debut jazz CD Practically Naked. In Vancouver, she sang jazz regularly at The Jazz Cellar and Rossini's, where she performed alongside some of the city's well-known jazz musicians at the time.

For her second CD, Always (A Salute to Patsy Cline), Vallance derived inspiration from her portrayal of Patsy Cline (with whom she shares a birthdate) in Dean Regan's staged production of A Closer Walk with Patsy Cline. Vallance toured western Canada with this production for six years, performing at numerous venues including two runs at the Granville Arts Club in Vancouver and the Alberta Theatre Projects in Calgary. Vallance opened for the Calgary Stampede as "Patsy", in 1999.

Motivated by the loss of a close personal friend, Vallance conceived the Divas for Life jazz benefit concerts held in Vancouver, B.C. In addition to producing the first concert at the Vogue Theater, in 2001, she negotiated a national distribution deal for the CD Divas for Life: Live At The Vogue!, which was released and performed as part of the 2001 Vancouver International Jazz Festival line-up. On Valentine's Day 2002, she produced Divas for Love. The proceeds of all concerts raised C$70,000 for people living with a life-threatening illness. As a result, Vallance was presented with Vancouver's "Friend in Deed" philanthropy award.

In 2004, Vallance debuted as a 'Jazz vocalist' in her hometown, Toronto, where she was accompanied by pianist Don Thompson, bassist Neil Swainson, and drummer Ted Warren. She also performed for the first time in her birth town Montréal, at The Upstairs, with jazz pianist Steve Amirault, bassist Zack Lober, and drummer Jim Doxas.

Vallance's fourth CD, Make My Night, was released in February 2008. Arranged by guitarist Pat Coleman, it features many other Canadian jazz musicians: pianist Ross Taggart, trumpeter Mike Herriot, saxophonist Tom Colclough, drummer Buff Allen and bassist Miles Hill.

In 2009, Vallance performed in the Medicine Hat Jazz Festival for the second year in a row and was the featured vocalist alongside Ernie Duff and the Stardust Big Band, in and around Saugeen Shores, ON. She also sang with the Charlie Bell Trio in the Thornbury and Kincardine Jazz Festivals.

In 2010, Vallance organized a 10-concert series, Stevie Vallance & the Masters of Jazz, at the Bruce County Museum in Southampton, ON, presenting a line-up of world-class players who accompanied her as the vocalist for the series: Richard Whiteman (piano), Mike Grace (bass), Kevin Barrett (guitar), Kieran Overs (bass), Ted Warren (drums), Bobby Brough (sax), Rob Clutton (bass), Nancy Walker (piano), Ted Quinlan (guitar), Tim Posgate (guitar) and George Koller (bass).
