= Vernon Weddle =

American film, stage and television actor

- Born: Vernon Weddle Jr. August 23, 1935 (age 91); Hattiesburg, Mississippi, U.S.
- Education: Lon Morris College; University of Texas at Austin; Stephens College
- Occupations: Film, stage and television actor
- Spouse: Gerri Weddle
- Children: 2

Vernon Weddle Jr. (born August 23, 1935) is an American film, stage and television actor. He is best known for playing General Washburne in the 1986 film Short Circuit.

== Early life and education ==
Weddle was born in Hattiesburg, Mississippi, the son of Vernon Sr. and Grace. When he was thirteen years old, Weddle and his family moved to Texas in 1958, where he has attended at Lon Morris College and the University of Texas at Austin. He then attended at Stephens College, where he was a resident actor and instructor for theatre arts.

== Career ==
Weddle began his career with a stage play, with his wife, Gerri. In the play, he played the role of an exhausted psychologist, with Tom Ewell as the lead in the play. The play was shown at the Okoboji Summer Theatre. Later in his career, Weddle began appearing in film and television programs, where he first appeared on the television series Mr. Deeds Goes to Town, playing Brad Kingsley. He also appeared in Bonanza, playing South, in 1969. He continued his career, mainly appearing in film and television programs.

Weddle appeared in numerous television programs including Barney Miller, The Mary Tyler Moore Show, Three's Company (and its spin-off The Ropers), Archie Bunker's Place, The Mod Squad, Sanford and Son, Buck Rogers in the 25th Century, Hill Street Blues, The Jeffersons, The Rockford Files, Trapper John, M.D., The Dukes of Hazzard and Lou Grant. He also appeared in television soap operas, such as, General Hospital, Dynasty, Knots Landing, Dallas, Hotel, The Colbys, Filthy Rich and Days of Our Lives, playing Bruce Fischell. Weddle appeared and co-starred in films such as The Parallax View, Oh, God! Book II, The Devil and Max Devlin, Norma Rae, Carbon Copy, Harry's War, Jacqueline Bouvier Kennedy, and Endangered Species. He also appeared in the television film Betrayal, where he played the role of the "Savings Officer". Weddle retired his career in 1990.

== Personal life ==
Weddle met his wife, Gerri at the Lon Morris College, where they both shared the same bill on the musical Roberta. They later married and had two sons, Kirk and Richard.

== Filmography ==
=== Film ===
Year	Title	Role	Notes
1974	The Take	Vanessi	
1974	The Parallax View	Harry Lutz	
1976	Family Plot	Priest in Diner	Uncredited
1979	Norma Rae	Reverend Hubbard	
1980	The Last Married Couple in America	Man at Soccer Game	
1980	Getting Wasted	Getting Wasted	
1980	Resurrection	2nd Scientist	
1980	Oh, God! Book II	Superintendent Jeffrey Hodges	
1981	The Devil and Max Devlin	Justice of the Peace	
1981	Harry's War	Ponde	
1981	Carbon Copy	Wardlow	
1982	White Dog	Vet	
1982	Endangered Species	Varney	
1984	The World of dBase	George Davies	
1986	Short Circuit	General Washburne	

=== Television ===
Year	Title	Role	Notes
1969	Bonanza	South	Episode: "The Stalker"
1969–1970	Bracken's World	Johnno / Harvey	3 episodes
1970	That Girl	Murray	Episode: "All's Well That Ends"
1970	The Mary Tyler Moore Show	Richie	Episode: "Divorce Isn't Everything"
1971	The Forgotten Man	Surgeon	Television film
1971	Nichols	Reporter	Episode: "The Siege"
1972	Second Chance	Lester Fern	Television film
1972	Sanford and Son	Mr. Clifford	Episode: "Blood Is Thicker Than Junk"
1972	The Mod Squad	Red Benson / Albert Cavelli	2 episodes
1972, 1973	Search	Narrator / McEgan	2 episodes
1973	The President's Plane Is Missing	Second Controller	Television film
1973	The New Perry Mason	Dr. Glober	Episode: "The Case of the Spurious Spouse"
1974	Scream of the Wolf	Newsman	Television film
1974	Apple's Way	Nelson Heintz	Episode: "The Coach"
1974	Death Sentence	Hayden	Television film
1974	Betrayal	Savings Officer	Television film
1974	Harry O	Desk Clerk	Episode: "Accounts Balanced"
1974–1976	Emergency!	Various roles	3 episodes
1975	Medical Story	Dr. Ellis	Television film
1975	Switch	Ray Nesset	Episode: "The Body at the Bottom"
1975	The Streets of San Francisco	Hendrix	Episode: "Web of Lies"
1975, 1977	The Waltons	Rev. Caldwell / Dr. Culler	2 episodes
1976	The Dumplings	Wilson	Episode: "Joe Takes a Fall"
1976	Holmes & Yoyo	Mr. Peerless	Episode: "Funny Money"
1976	The Rockford Files	Mike Prescott	Episode: "So Help Me God"
1976	Mary Hartman, Mary Hartman	Man in Lobby	2 episodes
1977	Little House on the Prairie	Assayer Andy Anderson	Episode: "Gold Country"
1977	Handle with Care	Soldier	Television film
1977	Panic in Echo Park	Mason	Television film
1977	Most Wanted	Crill	Episode: "The Dutchman"
1977	Washington: Behind Closed Doors	Ashley	Episode: "Part 1"
1977	The Betty White Show	Installer	Episode: "Make Yourself at Home... Steal Something"
1977	Rafferty	Perry Newcomb	Episode: "Death Out of a Blue Sky"
1977	Carter Country	Guard	Episode: "By the Light of the Moonlight"
1977, 1980	The Jeffersons	Attendant #2 / Vincent Carter	2 episodes
1977–1980	Quincy, M.E.	Various roles	3 episodes
1977, 1981	Barney Miller	Lawrence Oaks / Alvin Trager	2 episodes
1978	To Kill a Cop	Chief Duncan	Television film
1978	Husbands, Wives & Lovers	Marty Barows	Episode: "The Women Strike"
1978	The Clone Master	Pine	Television film
1978	The Paper Chase	Prof. Lowry	Episode: "Great Expectations"
1978	The Incredible Hulk	District Attorney Jim Chase	Episode: "Escape from Los Santos"
1978	One Day at a Time	Mr. Olsen	Episode: "Hold the Mustard"
1979	The Cracker Factory	John	Television film
1979	Friendly Fire	Col. Georgi	Television film
1979	The Ropers	Ernest Grimes	Episode: "Days of Beer and Rosie"
1979	Mork & Mindy	Mr. Burnett	Episode: "Mork's Health Hints"
1979	Trapper John, M.D.	Floor Manager	Episode: "What Are Friends For?"
1979, 1980	B. J. and the Bear	Delwood P. Manners	2 episodes
1980	Galactica 1980	1st Cop	Episode: "Galactica Discovers Earth: Part 1"
1980	Wild Times	Roberts	Episode #1.2
1980	Sanford	Arresting Officer	Episode: "Retrospective: Part 1"
1980	The Dukes of Hazzard	John Zimbra	Episode: "Carnival of Thrills"
1980	Beulah Land	Clarence Anderson	Episode: "Part I"
1980	Eight Is Enough	DMV Clerk	Episode: "Welcome to Memorial Dr. Bradford"
1980	Lou Grant	Aubrey Ragsdale / Bob Rosko	2 episodes
1980	Three's Company	Mr. Weddle	Episode: "A Crowded Romance"
1980–1983	Alice	Various roles	3 episodes
1980, 1988	Knots Landing	George Hunt / Mandel's Partner	2 episodes
1981	Walking Tall	Dr. Porterson	Episode: "The Killing of McNeal County's Children"
1981	Buck Rogers in the 25th Century	Dr. Moray	Episode: "Mark of the Saurian"
1981	The Choice	Dr. Nathanson	Television film
1981	East of Eden	Bill Ames	3 episodes
1981	Murder in Texas	Dr. Joe	Television film
1981	Jacqueline Bouvier Kennedy	Aide	Television film
1981	Archie Bunker's Place	Cellmate #3	Episode: "Happy Birthday, Stephanie"
1981–1987	Dynasty	Mr. Afferton / Mr. Alpert	4 episodes
1982	Father Murphy	Theo	Episode: "Matthew and Elizabeth"
1982	Madame's Place	Aldo Brutus	Episode #1.48
1982	Voyagers!	Lane	Episode: "An Arrow Pointing East"
1982	Benson	E.G. Slade	Episode: "Mary and Her Lambs"
1982–1983	Filthy Rich	George Wilhoit	4 episodes
1982–1985	Simon & Simon	Various roles	3 episodes
1982–1987	Dallas		3 episodes
1983	The Awakening of Candra	Reiser	Television film
1983	AfterMASH	Barrett	Episode: "All About Christmas Eve"
1983	Amanda's	Mr. Schindler	Episode: "Amanda's Number One Son"
1983, 1985	Hotel	The Guest / Gordon Pierce	2 episodes
1984	Scarecrow and Mrs. King	George	Episode: "The Artful Dodger"
1984	Hart to Hart	Anthony Stratham	Episode: "Meanwhile, Back at the Ranch"
1985	St. Elsewhere	Zachary Wexler	Episode: "Bye, George"
1985	Hollywood Wives	Jameson	Episode #1.2
1985	Space	Space	Episode: "Part III"
1985	Malice in Wonderland	Samuel Goldwyn	Television film
1985	Hill Street Blues	Loring Oler	Episode: "Seoul on Ice"
1986	The Colbys	Gregory Farnsworth	Episode: "The Trial"
1986	Alfred Hitchcock Presents	Old Wildcatter	Episode: "Road Hog"
1987	Stingray	Arnie Brillstein	Episode: "The Greeter"
1987	Mr. Belvedere	Ticket Master	Episode: "Baby"
1987	Max Headroom	Finn	Episode: "Dream Thieves"
1987	Webster	Mr. Blaine	Episode: "The Strike"
1987	Billionaire Boys Club	Peter Faraday	Miniseries
1987–1989	Days of Our Lives	Bruce Fischell / Richard Stanley	8 episodes
1989	Highway to Heaven	Mr. Arnold	Episode: "Goodbye, Mr. Zelinka"
