= Budd Grossman =

American producer and screenwriter (1924–2017)

- Born: March 2, 1924; United States
- Died: August 9, 2017 (aged 93)
- Occupation(s): Producer, screenwriter
- Spouse: Joann Grossman

Budd J. Grossman (March 2, 1924 – August 9, 2017) was an American television producer and screenwriter. He produced and wrote for television programs including Dennis the Menace, The Doris Day Show, Get Smart, The Andy Griffith Show, Gilligan's Island, Diff'rent Strokes, Three's Company (and its spin-off Three's a Crowd), Maude, Small Wonder, The Paul Lynde Show, That Girl and The Real McCoys.

Grossman died on August 9, 2017, at the age of 93.
