= Three's a Crowd =

American sitcom (1984–1985)

- Also known as: Three's Company, Too
- Based on: Man About the House by; Johnnie Mortimer; Brian Cooke; Robin's Nest by; Johnnie Mortimer; Brian Cooke
- Developed by: Michael Ross; Bernie West; George Burditt; Martin Rips; Joseph Staretski
- Starring: John Ritter; Mary Cadorette; Robert Mandan; Alan Campbell
- Theme music composer: Michael Lloyd (music); Al Kasha, Joel Hirschhorn, Don Nicholl & Michael Lloyd (lyrics)
- Opening theme: "Side by Side"
- Ending theme: "Side by Side" (instrumental)
- Country of origin: United States
- Original language: English
- No. of seasons: 1
- No. of episodes: 22

Production
- Executive producers: Michael Ross; Bernie West; George Burditt
- Producers: Martin Rips; Joseph Staretski; George Sunga
- Camera setup: Videotape; Multi-camera
- Running time: approx. 23 minutes (per episode)
- Production companies: NRW Productions; Bergmann-Taffner Productions

Original release
- Network: ABC
- Release: September 25, 1984 – April 9, 1985

Related
- Three's Company; Robin's Nest

Three's a Crowd (also known as Three's Company, Too in the Three's Company syndication package) is an American sitcom television series produced as a spin-off sequel and continuation of Three's Company that aired on ABC from September 25, 1984 (one week after the final episode of Three's Company was broadcast), until April 9, 1985, with reruns airing until September 10, 1985. It is loosely based on the British sitcom Robin's Nest, which was itself a spin-off of Man About the House, on which Three's Company was based.

== Plot ==
In Three's Company's final episodes, Vicky Bradford (Mary Cadorette) is introduced as a love interest of Jack Tripper (John Ritter), beginning with the episode titled "Cupid Works Overtime". In the following two-part episode "Friends and Lovers", Jack proposes marriage, but Vicky, afraid of marriage after witnessing her parents' tumultuous relationship and bitter divorce, declines the offer. Vicky instead convinces Jack to move in with her in the vacant apartment above his restaurant. Vicky's wealthy father James Bradford (Robert Mandan) buys the building from Jack's former boss Frank Angelino. James does not approve of Jack, and he constantly tries to disrupt his and Vicky's relationship.

Other characters include E. Z. Taylor (Alan Campbell), Jack's eccentric assistant at the bistro, and Claudia Bradford (Jessica Walter), Vicky's mother and James's ex-wife.

== Cast ==
=== Main ===
- John Ritter as Jack Tripper
- Mary Cadorette as Victoria "Vicky" Bradford
- Robert Mandan as James Bradford
- Alan Campbell as E.Z. Taylor

=== Recurring ===
- Jessica Walter as Claudia Bradford

== Episodes ==
No.	Title	Directed by	Written by	Original release date	Prod. code
1	"Family Affair"	Dave Powers	Michael Ross, Bernie West & George Burditt	September 25, 1984	0102
Jack lies to his visiting aunt Mae (Billie Bird) to try to cover up his living arrangement with Vicky. Jack hires surfer E.Z. Taylor as his assistant at the restaurant.
2	"The Happy Couple"	Dave Powers	Michael Ross, Bernie West & George Burditt	October 9, 1984	0101
Jack and Vicky argue over money. Mr. Bradford offers to pay for sprinklers that Jack needs for the bistro if Jack can convince Vicky to marry him.
3	"The Maternal Triangle"	Dave Powers	Martin Rips & Joseph Staretski	October 16, 1984	0103
To get Vicky to accept his standing marriage proposal, Jack attempts to reunite Vicky's divorced parents. First appearance of Mrs. Bradford.
4	"Daddy's Little Girl"	Dave Powers	Karyl Geld Miller & Korby Siamis	October 23, 1984	0106
James moves in to care for Vicky when she comes down with the measles.
5	"Jack's Problem"	Dave Powers	Martin Rips & Joseph Staretski	October 30, 1984	0108
Jack seeks advice from a psychologist (James Karen) about his recent impotence. Vicky thinks Jack is cheating on her with E.Z.'s girlfriend Susie (Deborah Goodrich).
6	"Vacation from Sex"	Dave Powers	Martin Rips & Joseph Staretski (teleplay), Budd Grossman (story)	November 13, 1984	0110
Vicky and Jack try to spend time sharing each others' non-sexual interests.
7	"A Matter of Money"	Dave Powers	Budd Grossman	November 20, 1984	0105
When Jack is asked to identify a counterfeiter, Mr. Bradford appears in the police lineup. Based on "A Matter of Note" by Johnnie Mortimer and Brian Cooke. Guest cast: William Cort as Lt. Burke, Bruce Kirby as Sgt. Harry Collins, Mitzi Hoag as Mrs. Collins, Rick Fitts as Desk Sergeant, and Bill Shick as Officer Hamilton
8	"The Honeymooners"	Dave Powers	Lissa Levin	November 27, 1984	0112
Aboard a flight to Acapulco, Jack mistakes an air marshal for hijacker. When they arrive, James crashes their vacation.
9	"A Little Competition"	Dave Powers	David Mirkin	December 4, 1984	0104
Vicky's former boyfriend opens a seafood restaurant across from Jack's Bistro and makes Jack jealous. Based on the episode of the same name by Johnnie Mortimer and Brian Cooke.
10	"A Foreign Affair"	Dave Powers	Rich Reinhart	December 11, 1984	0109
James tries to match his ex-wife with a business acquaintance, hoping to cease paying her alimony.
11	"James Steps Out"	Dave Powers	Martin Rips & Joseph Staretski	December 18, 1984	0107
After James falls for a young artist (Sharon Wyatt), Jack tries to save him from heartbreak. Based on "Piggy in the Middle" by Johnnie Mortimer and Brian Cooke.
12	"Father Knows Nothing"	Dave Powers	Marty Farrell	January 8, 1985	0113
Jack thinks Vicky is pregnant, but it's E.Z.'s dog who is expecting.
13	"A Friend in Deed"	Dave Powers	Stan Burns & Paul Wayne	January 15, 1985	0111
Jack mistakenly believes that Vicky's friend (Gail Edwards) is coming on to him.
14	"A Case of Sour Grapes"	Dave Powers	Norman Chandler Fox & Mark Tuttle	January 22, 1985	0114
Jack convinces Vicky to invest in a case of vintage wine, but when it turns out to be sour, he takes a job at a sushi house to repay her.
15	"Private Lessons"	Dave Powers	Phil Mishkin	January 29, 1985	0116
Jack grooms E.Z. for a date with a high-class girl who only seems interested in Jack.
16	"One Ego to Go"	Dave Powers	Martin Rips, Joseph Staretski & Rich Reinhart	February 5, 1985	0115
With his ego bruised after to losing a trivia game to Vicky, Jack tries to best her but ends up embarrassing himself at a beach carnival in front of guests.
17	"September Song"	Dave Powers	Martin Rips & Joseph Staretski	February 12, 1985	0118
After Jack and James get drunk together, James is arrested for urinating in public and ends up in court. Based on the episode of the same name by George Layton.
18	"Deeds of Trust"	Dave Powers	Mark Tuttle	February 19, 1985	0117
Jack's old friend Larry (Richard Kline) from Three's Company invites him to a swinging party where old flame Greedy Gretchen (Teresa Ganzel) makes a move on Jack.
19	"The New Mr. Bradford"	Dave Powers	Phil Mishkin	February 26, 1985	0119
After Jack saves James's life, James finds Jack to be the son he never had.
20	"King For a Day"	Dave Powers	Mark Tuttle	March 5, 1985	0120
With his restaurant suddenly popular after a glowing review, Jack forgets about his and Vicky's first anniversary.
21	"Jack Gets Trashed"	Dave Powers	Martin Rips & Joseph Staretski	April 2, 1985	0122
Jack butts heads with James on a radio debate show.
22	"A Star Is Born"	Dave Powers	Michael Ross, Bernie West & George Burditt	April 9, 1985	0121
When Jack and Vicky are cast in a commercial for her airline, Jack fights with the temperamental director (Stuart Pankin).

== Home media ==
On December 22, 2023, Visual Entertainment Inc. released a special 40th anniversary box set of Three's Company that also includes all episodes of Three's a Crowd and The Ropers.

== Reruns ==
Daytime reruns aired on ABC from September 23, 1985, to January 3, 1986, followed by another prime-time run on USA Network. Some syndicated versions aired under the title Three's Company, Too, using the theme song of Three's Company.

Six episodes of the series aired on TV Land in September 2006, and four episodes aired on WGN America in October 2008. The series began airing on Antenna TV in June 2011 (as Three's a Crowd, with its "Side by Side" theme song). The series is available for streaming in the U.S. as of July 2021 on Pluto TV and as of June 2022 on Tubi.
