= Michael Ross (screenwriter) =

American screenwriter (1919–2009)

- Born: Isadore Rovinsky; August 4, 1919; New York City, New York, U.S.
- Died: May 26, 2009 (aged 89); Los Angeles, California, U.S.
- Other name: "Mickey"
- Occupations: Screenwriter, Television producer
- Years active: 1971–1985
- Spouse: Irene Saslaw (m. 1950; died 2000)

Michael Ross (born Isadore Rovinsky) (August 4, 1919 – May 26, 2009) was an American screenwriter and television producer. Ross, together with writing partners Don Nicholl and Bernard West, were writers/producers for All in the Family (for which Ross won the 1973 Emmy Award for Writing for a Comedy Series), The Jeffersons, The Dumplings, and Three's Company. Ross and West continued as executive producers of Three's Company after the death of partner Nicholl in 1980, also producing the spin-off shows The Ropers and Three's a Crowd.

== Biography ==
Born and raised in New York City to Jewish family, Ross graduated from City College of New York City in 1939. Ross then served as a bomber pilot in United States Army Air Forces during World War II. Ross, along with longtime business partner Bernie West, made his mark in the 1970s with the breakout TV sitcom All in the Family, for which he won a writing Emmy in 1973.

Ross first worked with Norman Lear in the 1950s when Lear was the producer of NBC's short-lived (26 episodes) sitcom The Martha Raye Show. After writing for Lear's All in the Family, Ross wrote and served as executive producer for the spin-off The Jeffersons.

Ross later established the Michael and Irene Ross Chair in Hebrew and Yiddish and the Michael and Irene Ross Program in Jewish Studies at the City University of New York in New York City. Ross also made a $3 million bequest and 25% share of his rights to all his shows to the National Yiddish Book Center.

Ross died May 26, 2009, due to complications following a stroke and heart attack.
