= My 5 Wives =

- Film Poster
- Directed by: Sidney J. Furie
- Written by: Rodney Dangerfield; Harry Basil
- Produced by: John Curtis; Rodney Dangerfield
- Starring: Rodney Dangerfield; Andrew Dice Clay
- Cinematography: Curtis J. Petersen
- Edited by: Saul Pincus
- Music by: Robert Carli
- Distributed by: Artisan Entertainment
- Release date: September 8, 2000
- Running time: 100 minutes
- Countries: United States, Canada
- Language: English

My 5 Wives is a 2000 American comedy film, which was directed by Sidney J. Furie and starring Rodney Dangerfield.

== Plot ==
After his third marriage ends in divorce, wealthy Los Angeles land developer Monte Peterson travels to Utah hoping to open a ski resort. He competes against an "evil" banker, Preston Gates, hoping to snatch land from the defaulting farmers to gain control for mob investors, who want to build a casino.

After winning a land auction, Monte's friend explains the polygamous traditions of the area. Monte must join the church to purchase the land. He learns that the purchase stipulates that he must marry the widows of the former owner. Monte is disgusted with this, declaring that his marrying days are over, but reconsiders when he sees the widows (Judy Tylor, Kate Luyben, Angelika Baran).

Monte marries all three, and is excited, until he discovers how difficult it is to please amorous young wives, and also how terrible their cooking is. He develops methods to care for them, in a fair manner.

He learns that one wife is a twin sister to a wife of banker Gates, making Gates his brother in law, Gates, is in cahoots with a mobster from Las Vegas, Tony Morano, who assures him that his armed henchman "Shuffles" will handle matters if Gates does not. After another resident passes away, Gates attempts to take control of the deceased owner's land along with his two widows (Emmanuelle Vaugier, Anita Brown) by calling in unpaid debts.

Monte is reluctant to marry yet again, until he sees these two women are extremely skilled in the kitchen, thus he ends up with several more acres of land and two more wives. Monte retires the debt of their first husband, thus once again thwarting Gates, who sought repossession of the mortgaged lands over repayment of the debt.

Gates, frustrated, has his associate Stewart try to catch Monte in the act of smoking or drinking to get him excommunicated from the church and kicked out of town. As a treat, Monte takes his wives for a honeymoon to Las Vegas, introducing them to gambling and other joys of the modern world like tennis and bikinis.

The ladies go to a women's equality seminar where the speaker, Dr. Van Dyke (Molly Shannon), preaches that women should dominate the relationship and be completely equal to their "lesser halves." The wives enter a strip club, one where men dance. Monte goes to retrieve them, where he ends up in the show.

After returning to Utah, the ladies take a more dominant role in the house and become less dependent. At the digging site for his new ski resort, Monte's crew discovers human bones and believes they have uncovered an ancient Native American burial ground.

Gates has a scheme to frame Monte for a counterfeit money operation. Monte goes to jail, and assistant Ray confirms they have indeed been building on an ancient burial site. At a town trial, Gates argues that Monte should be excommunicated. His wives and his lawyer/waiter Paul attest that Monte is a good man, but he is found guilty regardless.

Tony and his right hand man Shuffles come into town, and inform Gates that they have been sent by crime boss Don Giovanni, to assassinate Monte. Gates gloats that he is of Native American descent, making him the rightful owner of the land, enabling him to turn the town into a gambling resort. Monte's wives drive a truck into the jail and break him out.

Monte races to the dig site where the police show up and Gates' plan is revealed. The police arrest Gates and Monte is free to go, but Don Giovanni appears. All seems lost until Don Giovanni (Jerry Stiller) recognizes Monte as his old childhood friend, whom Monte had built his first house. Don Giovanni yells at his hoods, for not telling him that it was Monte looking to build the ski resort; otherwise he would have left his good friend alone.

Alone with his five wives, Monte asks that they make a decision about their future... leading to him getting thrown out. Monte leaves Utah, but finds happiness with his ninth and current wife, Dr. Van Dyke, who commends him for being the "sensitive man" she always sought.

== Cast ==
- Rodney Dangerfield as Monte Peterson
- John Byner as Preston Gates
- John Pinette as Stewart
- Jerry Stiller as Don Giovanni
- Andrew Dice Clay as Anthony "Tony" Morano
- Molly Shannon as Dr. Barbara Van Dyke
- Rob deLeeuw as Shuffles
- Fred Keating as Ray
- Jud Tylor as Stephanie
- Angelika Libera as Emily
- Kate Luyben as Virginia

== Critical response ==
The film was met with unfavorable reviews from critics.
