= George Burditt (writer) =

American television writer and producer

- Burditt in E! True Hollywood Story (1998)
- Born: George Henry Burditt; July 29, 1923; Boston, Massachusetts, U.S.
- Died: June 25, 2013 (aged 89); Burbank, California, U.S.
- Resting place: San Fernando Mission Cemetery (Mission Hills, Los Angeles); 34°16′25.48″N 118°28′1.71″W
- Occupations: Writer, producer
- Years active: 1970–1987
- Television: Three's Company
- Spouse: Joyce Rebeta (m. 1957)
- Children: 3, including Jack Burditt
- Parent(s): John and Dorothy Burditt

George Henry Burditt (July 29, 1923 – June 25, 2013) was an American television writer and producer who wrote sketches for television variety shows and other programs such as Three's Company, for which he was also an executive producer in its last few seasons. Burditt was Emmy-nominated in writing categories alongside writing crew, including his writing partner Paul Wayne, for twice each The Sonny & Cher Comedy Hour and Van Dyke and Company.

== Early life ==
George Henry Burditt was born in Boston, Massachusetts, on July 29, 1923, to John and Dorothy Burditt. He had one brother. Burditt served in the United States Marine Corps in the Pacific Ocean during World War II. After the war, he worked for American Greetings, a greetings cards manufacturer, in Cleveland, Ohio. He married Joyce Rebeta-Burditt in the city on May 11, 1957, who later became also a writer. Prior to their marriage, they both worked under the same manufacturer: Joyce was an employee writing verses for greeting cards, and George was her boss. She was fired from the company after working for three weeks.

== Career ==
Burditt moved from Cleveland to Los Angeles to become a television writer. Individually, he wrote episodes of the first season of Doc (1975–76), an episode of The Jeffersons titled "George vs. Wall Street" (1975), and episodes of the short-lived Three's Company spinoffs The Ropers (1979–80) and Three's a Crowd (1984–85), the latter he also produced. He also wrote sketches for variety shows that featured the Hudson Brothers, Joey and Ray Heatherton, Lola Falana, and Sonny Bono. He served as executive producer of—but did not write for—Silver Spoons and 227.

Burditt and his writing partner Paul Wayne wrote an episode of All in the Family titled "Archie Eats and Runs" (1974) and, alongside Aaron Ruben, a 1974 episode of Sanford and Son titled "The Way to Lamont's Heart". They also mostly co-wrote the first three seasons (1977–79) of the television series Three's Company. Burditt served as an executive producer of the series from 1981 to 1984.

The writing crew, including Burditt and Paul Wayne, received Emmy Award nominations for Outstanding Writing for a Variety or Music Series in 1972 and 1974 for The Sonny & Cher Comedy Hour. The different writing crew, also including Burditt and Wayne, received an Emmy nomination for the same category in 1977 for Van Dyke and Company, a short-lived variety show starring Dick Van Dyke. In 1976, one year prior, Burditt and other writers were Emmy-nominated for an Outstanding Writing in a Comedy Variety or Music Special for the preceding television special of the same name. (Wayne was not listed among the writers of the special.)

=== Selected filmography ===
Unless otherwise indicated, years refer to the duration of the show, not the duration of Burditt's work.

Main source: Deadline

- The Sonny & Cher Comedy Hour (1971–74)
- All in the Family, "Archie Eats and Runs" (1974; Season 4, Episode 21) – with Paul Wayne
- Sanford and Son, "The Way to Lamont's Heart" (1974; Season 3, Episode 23) – with Paul Wayne (story/teleplay) and Aaron Ruben (teleplay only)
- The Sonny Comedy Revue (1974)
- The Hudson Brothers Show (1974) – later renamed The Hudson Brothers Razzle Dazzle Comedy Show (1974–77), for which Burditt did not write
- The Jeffersons, "George vs. Wall Street" (1975; Season 2, Episode 15)
- Joey and Dad (1975) – starring Joey and Ray Heatherton
- Doc (1975–76) – first season only
- Lola (1975–76) – three specials, starring Lola Falana
- Van Dyke and Company (1975–77) – starring Dick Van Dyke
- Three's Company (1977–84) – writer and executive producer
- The Ropers (1979–80)
- Three's a Crowd (1984–85) – writer and executive producer

Executive producer (only)
Source: Deadline

- Silver Spoons (1982–87)
- 227 (1985–90)

=== Award nominations ===
Burditt earned four Emmy Award nominations alongside writing crew of the television variety series that he wrote for:

- 24th Primetime Emmy Awards, 1972 – Outstanding Writing Achievement in Variety or Music, The Sonny & Cher Comedy Hour
- 26th Primetime Emmy Awards, 1974 – Best Writing in Variety or Music, The Sonny & Cher Comedy Hour
- 28th Primetime Emmy Awards, 1976 – Outstanding Writing in a Comedy-Variety or Music Special, Van Dyke and Company
- 29th Primetime Emmy Awards, 1977 – Outstanding Writing in a Comedy-Variety or Music Series, Van Dyke and Company

== Personal life and death ==
Burditt and his wife Joyce had three children: sons Paul and Jack, and a daughter named Ellen. Joyce later became a network executive and a mystery writer; Jack is a television writer and producer.

Burditt lived for 46 years in Burbank, California, and had nine grandchildren and seven great-grandchildren, one of whom predeceased him. He died at age 89 on June 25, 2013, and was buried at San Fernando Mission Cemetery in Mission Hills, Los Angeles.

== Bibliography ==
- Lewellen, Scott (2013). Funny You Should Ask: Oral Histories of Classic Sitcom Storytellers. McFarland. ISBN 978-0-7864-7148-5.
- Terrace, Vincent (1985). Encyclopedia of Television: Series, Pilots and Specials, Vol. 2: 1974–1984. New York Zoetrope. ISBN 0-918432-61-8.
