= Bernie West =

American screenwriter

- Publicity Photo of Bernie West
- Born: Bernard Wessler; May 30, 1918; New York City, U.S.
- Died: July 29, 2010 (aged 92); Beverly Hills, California, U.S.
- Education: Baruch College
- Occupation: television writer
- Spouse: Miriam "Mimi" West (died 2004)
- Children: 2 daughters
- Writing career
- Period: 1970s and 1980s
- Genre: sitcoms
- Notable works: All in the Family; The Jeffersons; Three's Company; The Ropers; Three's A Crowd
- Notable awards: Emmy (1973)

Bernie West (May 30, 1918 – July 29, 2010) was an American television writer and actor best known for his work in situation comedies such as All in the Family, its spinoff The Jeffersons, and Three's Company.

== Biography ==
Born on May 30, 1918, in the Bronx, New York City as Bernard Wessler, to Russian-Jewish immigrants; he earned his undergraduate degree from Baruch College, earning a Bachelor of Business Science in advertising. West worked as a nightclub comedian, and performed on tour with the U.S.O. in the Pacific Theatre after being rejected from the military due to medical issues. As part of the comedy duo Ross & West, he toured the hotel circuit in the Catskills and Poconos with Ross Martin, quipping, "Everything we did may not have been original, but what we stole was good!" After Martin left, he was replaced by college friend Mickey Ross who changed his name from Isadore Rovinsky so the comedy duo could retain the Ross & West name.

=== Broadway and film credits ===
West appeared on Broadway in the 1956 production of Bells Are Ringing, creating the comedic character of Dr. Kitchell, the frustrated dentist who composed songs on a compressed air hose. He reprised that role in the 1960 film version starring Judy Holliday and Dean Martin.

He also appeared in 1962's All American by Mel Brooks and starring Ray Bolger, Poor Bitos with Donald Pleasence, The Beauty Part with Bert Lahr and the 1969 production of The Front Page alongside Helen Hayes. TV appearances included The Ed Sullivan Show, Car 54 Where Are You?, and The Phil Silvers Show (to whose namesake he bore a passing resemblance). He also had a guest shot on Gomer Pyle U.S.M.C..

=== Television work ===
After submitting a script for the show in 1971, West and partner Mickey Ross became writers for Norman Lear's All in the Family, working with another partner, Don Nicholl, as producers. West won an Emmy Award in 1973 for his writing on the episode "The Bunkers and the Swingers", together with Ross and Lee Kalcheim. The writing team created the character played by Bea Arthur as the lead in the All in the Family spinoff Maude. The trio wrote and produced The Jeffersons, another spinoff from All in the Family that ran for a decade starting in 1975. They created, produced, and wrote for the short-lived situation comedy The Dumplings, whose pilot aired in 1975 and which ran as a weekly series in early 1976. In 1977, they adapted for US audiences a British sitcom into Three's Company, which ran until 1984, as well as that show's less-successful spinoffs The Ropers and Three's a Crowd.

Together with his wife Mimi, who died in April 2004, West was a generous contributor to the Los Angeles Free Clinic. She had first discovered the Clinic after driving her husband to his job writing for All in the Family. West regularly contributed a portion of his salary while his wife worked there without pay. In 1997, the couple donated $500,000 towards the provision of pediatric dental care for those children without access to dentists.

West died at age 92 on July 29, 2010, at his home in Beverly Hills, California due to complications of Alzheimer's disease. He was survived by two daughters and two grandsons.
