= Joyce DeWitt =

American actress (born 1949)

Joyce Anne DeWitt
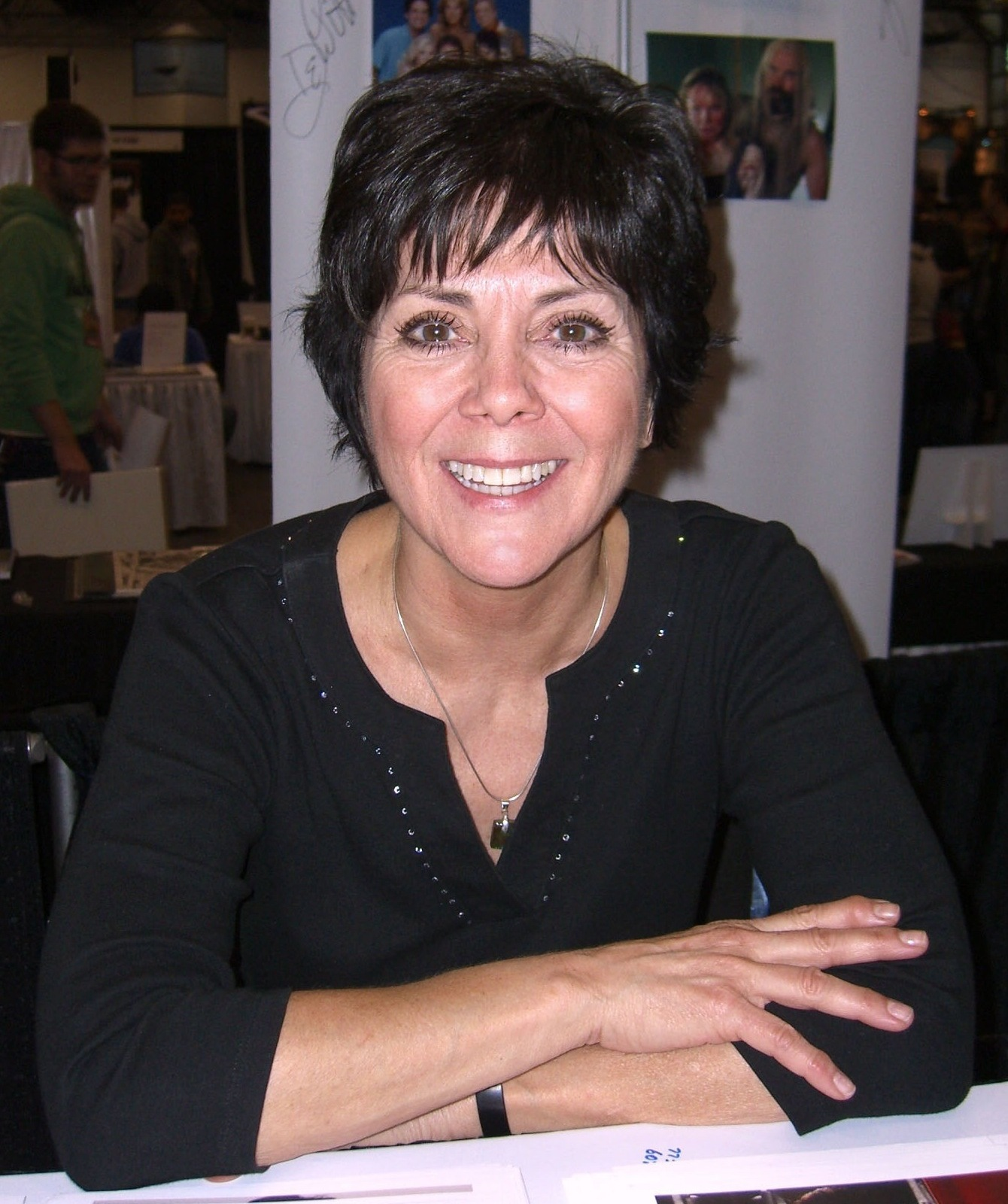
- DeWitt at the New York Comic Con in 2010
- Born: April 23, 1949 (age 77); Wheeling, West Virginia, U.S.
- Education: Ball State University (BA); University of California, Los Angeles (MFA)
- Occupation: Actress
- Years active: 1962–1984, 1991–present
- Known for: Three's Company

Joyce Anne DeWitt (born April 23, 1949) is an American actress best known for playing Janet Wood on the ABC sitcom Three's Company from 1977 to 1984. DeWitt along with Richard Kline are the last surviving original cast members of the series.

== Early life ==
Joyce Anne DeWitt was born on April 23, 1949, in Wheeling, West Virginia, and grew up in Speedway, Indiana, a suburb of Indianapolis. She is the second of four children born to Norma (née Branch) DeWitt (1926–2013) and Paul DeWitt (1925–2016). She is of Italian descent from her mother, while her father was of Swedish and Dutch descent. DeWitt began appearing on stage at the age of 13. She competed in speech and debate through the Indiana High School Forensic Association. She graduated from Speedway Senior High School, and once worked at the Indianapolis Motor Speedway ticket office.

She earned her bachelor's degree in theater from Ball State University. Subsequently, while she was performing in summer stock, the director convinced her to enroll in UCLA's Department of Theater MFA program, where she was awarded the Master of Fine Arts Fellowship as well as the Clifton Webb Scholarship. She graduated in 1974.

== Career ==
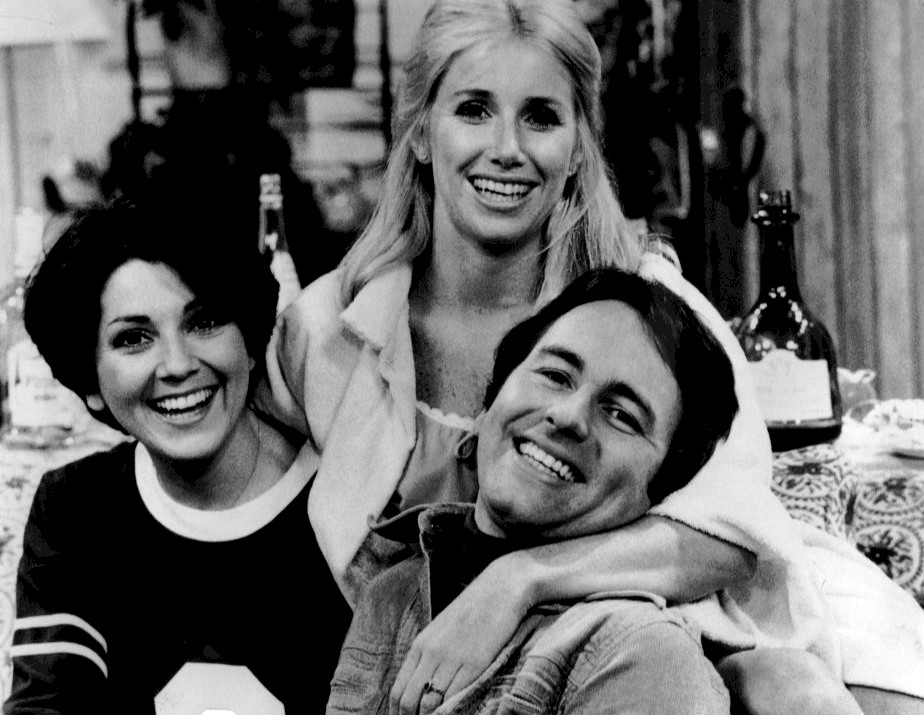
DeWitt (left) with John Ritter and Suzanne Somers in the promotional photo of the series premiere of Three's Company, 1977

While attending UCLA, she worked as a secretary until her television debut on an episode of Baretta. Contrary to rumors that she was mentored by actor Abe Vigoda, Dewitt has said that the two never met.

DeWitt is best known for her role as Janet Wood during the 1977–1984 run of the sitcom Three's Company, a job she obtained after being cast in the show's second pilot. She also played Janet in a 1979 episode of the spinoff series The Ropers. DeWitt would also make several appearances on TV game shows, including Tattletales, which also featured her then-boyfriend, actor Ray Buktenica, as well as Pyramid. In 1978, she also appeared with her Three's Company co-stars (Ritter, Norman Fell, Audra Lindley, and Richard Kline) on a special celebrity edition of Family Feud (hosted by Richard Dawson) where they competed against the cast of the TV shows Soap and The Love Boat. In 2004, she appeared as a celebrity panelist on one of the last episodes of the syndicated version of Hollywood Squares (hosted by Tom Bergeron).

After Three's Company ended in 1984, DeWitt appeared in an episode of Finder of Lost Loves in 1984, after which she quit acting for several years. She resumed acting with a part in a production of Noises Off at Michigan's Cherry County Playhouse in June 1991. She later appeared in the 1995 TV comedy film Spring Fling! A character based on her, voiced by another actress, appeared in a 1997 episode of Pinky and the Brain. She made an appearance in an episode of Cybill, and had a cameo on the penultimate episode of Living Single. Her 2000s works includes TV shows such as Hope Island, The Nick at Nite Holiday Special and Call of the Wild.

DeWitt co-produced and hosted the 2003 NBC-TV television film Behind the Camera: The Unauthorized Story of Three's Company. In the film, DeWitt is portrayed by Melanie Paxson.

In 2008, she appeared in the indie film Failing Better Now. In 2009, DeWitt starred in a stage production of Married Alive in Calgary, Alberta, Canada.

In June 2011, DeWitt succeeded Eve Plumb in the title role of the play Miss Abigail's Guide to Dating, Mating & Marriage at the Downstairs Cabaret Theatre in New York City's Times Square. That same year, she appeared in a Canadian stage production of Dinner with Friends at Theatre Aquarius in Hamilton, Ontario.

In 2012, DeWitt appeared in two separate stage productions of Love Letters starring opposite Tab Hunter and Tony Dow, respectively. In August 2012, she starred with her niece, Katharine DeWitt, in a production of Remember Me at the Alhambra Dinner Theatre in Jacksonville, Florida.

Also in 2012, DeWitt appeared on Suzanne Somers' talk show, Suzanne Somers: Breaking Through, during which she and Somers reminisced about their time on Three's Company together. Somers apologized for the conflict that arose between them, and they exchanged anecdotes about the last time they each spoke to their late co-star John Ritter. DeWitt's appearance on Somers' program marked the first time the two actresses had seen or spoken to each other since having a major falling out 31 years earlier, involving a salary dispute.

In 2014, DeWitt became a panelist on a local version of the classic game show Hollywood Squares (in turn she was also a panelist on the actual show itself back in the day) called The West Virginia Squares hosted by "The Master of The Hollywood Squares" himself Peter Marshall as part of an event called FestivALL at The Clay Center at the WV Music Hall of Fame. The other local celebrities were: Autumn Blair, Billy Edd Wheeler, Bil Lepp, Charlie McCoy, Charlisse Hailsop, Danny Jones, Donnie Davidson, Larry Groce, Landau Eugene Murphy Jr., Michael Cerveris and Steve Bishop. It aired on WVPB on April 11 and April 25 and on The West Virginia Channel on April 12 and April 15 for two episodes. Additionally, Marshall, like DeWitt, was also a native of West Virginia.

In 2018, DeWitt played Mother Superior in a stage production of Nunsense at the Hunterdon Hills Playhouse in New Jersey.

In 2023, DeWitt made her debut appearance in the country music video ballad called "Home" by the Davisson Brothers Band where it captures the nostalgia and comfort of returning to where it all began. The song can be heard from the album "Home is Where the Heart is".

== Charitable work ==
DeWitt participated at the Capitol Hill Forum on Hunger and Homelessness with members of the House and Senate, and she has hosted presentations for the Family Assistance Program of Hollywood. She hosted the International Awards Ceremony at the White House for the Presidential End Hunger Awards, and with Jeff Bridges, she co-hosted the World Food Day Gala at the Kennedy Center.

== Personal life ==
DeWitt has never married or had any children. She was in a romantic relationship with actor and director Ray Buktenica from 1973 to 1980.

On July 4, 2009, DeWitt was arrested and cited for DUI in El Segundo, California. At the police station, she was booked, cited, and released on her own recognizance. On May 27, 2010, she pleaded no contest to one count misdemeanor, was placed on three years' probation and was ordered to undergo a nine-month long alcoholism prevention program. She was also ordered to pay a $510 fine, plus penalty assessments. In exchange for her plea, a second misdemeanor count was dismissed.

== Filmography ==
Year	Title	Role	Notes
1975	Baretta	Mother Earth	Episode: "Sharper Than a Serpent's Tooth"
1976	Most Wanted	Cindy	TV movie
1977–1984	Three's Company	Janet Wood	Main cast (170 episodes)
1978	With This Ring	Jilly Weston	TV movie
1979	Supertrain	Natalie Smithburne	Episode: "Pirouette"
1979	The Ropers	Janet Wood	Episode: "The Party"
1979	The Love Boat	Jackie Landers	Episode: "The Audit Couple/The Scoop/My Boyfriend's Back"
1980	The B.B. Beegle Show	Herself (guest star)	TV pilot episode
1984	Finder of Lost Loves	Lynn Powell	Episode: "Portraits"
1995	Spring Fling!	Linda Hayden	TV movie
1995	Cybill	Psychic Pals Host	Episode: "The Odd Couples"
1998	Living Single	Herself (guest star)	Episode: "To Catch a Thief"
1998	Twitch City	Herself (guest star)	Episode: "I Look Like Joyce DeWitt"
2000	Hope Island	Laetitia Barton	Episode: "A Rising Tide Takes All Boats"
2003	The Nick at Nite Holiday Special	Miss DeWitt, The Housekeeper	TV special
2009	Call of the Wild	Jolene	Feature film
2010	Failing Better Now	Irene	Feature film
2011	The Great Fight	Randi Toney	Feature film
2014	Snapshot	First Lady	Feature film
2014	My Boyfriends' Dogs	Nikki	TV movie
2015	Rock Story	Judge Carol Anne Connelly	Feature film
2018	The Savant	Detective Randi Toney	Feature film
2022	Ask Me to Dance	Nana	Feature film
