= The Dumplings (TV series) =

American sitcom television series

- James Coco as Joe Dumpling and Geraldine Brooks as Angela Dumpling in The Dumplings.
- Genre: Situation comedy
- Created by: Don Nicholl; Michael Ross; Bernie West
- Based on: The Dumplings by Fred Lucky
- Developed by: Norman Lear
- Starring: James Coco; Geraldine Brooks
- Opening theme: "Two By Two, Side by Side", performed by Steve Lawrence
- Country of origin: United States
- Original language: English
- No. of seasons: 1
- No. of episodes: 11 (1 unaired)

Production
- Producers: Don Nicholl; Michael Ross; Bernie West; George Sunga
- Running time: 30 minutes
- Production company: T.A.T Communications Company

Original release
- Network: NBC
- Release: October 4, 1975 – March 31, 1976

The Dumplings is an American sitcom starring James Coco and Geraldine Brooks that aired on NBC during the 1975–76 television season. The series was based on a syndicated comic strip of the same name by Fred Lucky that ran in newspapers from 1975 to 1977.

== Cast ==
- James Coco as Joe Dumpling
- Geraldine Brooks as Angela Dumpling
- George S. Irving as Charles Sweetzer
- George Furth as Frederic Steele
- Marcia Rodd as Stephanie
- Mort Marshall as Cully
- Jane Connell as Bridget (Norah) McKenna
- Wil Albert as The Prude

== Synopsis ==
Joe and Angela Dumpling are a very happily married and overweight couple who are very much in love with each other and with life, never have a bad thing to say about one another, and exude good cheer and enthusiasm. They operate Dudley's Take-Out, a luncheonette on the ground floor of a Manhattan skyscraper owned by the Bristol Oil Company. Charles Sweetzer, who works upstairs as executive vice president of Bristol Oil, is a regular customer, as are New York city councilman Frederic Steele, Mr. Sweetzer's secretary Bridget McKenna (or Norah McKenna, according to some sources), and Angela's sister Stephanie. Cully is the Dumplings' employee at the luncheonette and works as the cashier. The Dumplings' obesity is a source of much humor as they interact with customers, friends, and family.

== Production ==
The show originated as a syndicated comic strip created by Fred Lucky. Norman Lear developed the series for television and Don Nicholl, Michael Ross, and Bernie West created and produced it, with George Sunga also serving as a producer. Episode directors were Paul Bogart, Hal Cooper, and Dennis Steinmetz. Nicholl, Ross, and West all wrote for the show, as did Joseph Bonaduce, Bill Davenport, Fred S. Fox, Gary David Goldberg, Seaman Jacobs, Fred Lucky, Barry Sand, and Alan Uger.

Angela Dumpling was the final role of Geraldine Brooks' career; she died in 1977.

Steve Lawrence sang the show's theme song, "Two By Two, Side By Side."

== Broadcast history ==
NBC broadcast the pilot episode of The Dumplings on October 4, 1975. The Dumplings joined NBC's regular lineup on January 28, 1976, with a rebroadcast of the pilot in the show's regular time slot at 9:30 p.m. on Wednesdays. Its tenth and final episode aired on March 31, 1976. An eleventh episode was never broadcast.

== Episodes ==
No.	Title	Directed by	Written by	Original release date
1	"Pilot"	Paul Bogart	Don Nicholl, Michael Ross & Bernie West	October 4, 1975
Joe and Angela try to celebrate the anniversary of their first meeting. NBC rebroadcast this episode on January 28, 1976, as the first episode of the weekly series in its regular time slot.
2	"The Ultimatum"	Unknown	Don Nicholl, Michael Ross & Bernie West	February 4, 1976
The Dumplings' landlord orders them to move their luncheonette out of the building after Joe calls Mr. Steele a thief.
3	"To Drink or Not to Drink"	Unknown	Joseph Bonaduce	February 11, 1976
The Dumplings inherit a $900 bottle of wine and must decide whether or not to drink it.
4	"The Parting"	Unknown	Don Nicholl, Michael Ross & Bernie West	February 18, 1976
Joe and Angela must be apart for the first time in their 15-year marriage.
5	"Gourmet's Delight"	Unknown	Gary David Goldberg	February 25, 1976
A newspaper columnist praises Angela's soup.
6	"Sweetzer's Image"	Unknown	Fred S. Fox & Seaman Jacobs	March 3, 1976
Mr. Sweetzer seeks refuge with the Dumplings after a fight with his wife.
7	"Cully's Sister"	Unknown	Unknown	March 10, 1976
Cully's twin sister makes a surprise visit – and reveals an even bigger surprise.
8	"The Other Woman"	Unknown	Barry Sand & Alan Uger	March 17, 1976
Stephanie becomes hysterical when she sees her boyfriend, Mr. Steele, with another woman.
9	"The Foundling"	Unknown	Don Nicholl, Michael Ross & Bernie West	March 24, 1976
Angela talks a woman out of committing suicide.
10	"Joe Takes a Fall"	Unknown	Bill Davenport	March 31, 1976
Joe is injured in a fall from a broken apartment step. Vernon Weddle guest-stars.
11	"Joe Gets Jugged"	N/A	N/A	Unaired
Joe is arrested after he accidentally knocks out a policeman.
