= Betrayal (1974 film) =

- Title card
- Genre: Drama; Thriller
- Based on: Only Couples Need Apply by Doris Miles Disney
- Teleplay by: James M. Miller
- Directed by: Gordon Hessler
- Starring: Amanda Blake; Tisha Sterling
- Theme music composer: Ernest Gold
- Country of origin: United States
- Original language: English

Production
- Executive producer: Charles W. Fries
- Producer: Gerald Isenberg
- Production locations: Gulls Way Estate - 26800 Pacific Coast Highway, Malibu, California
- Cinematography: Jacques R. Marquette
- Editor: John A Martinelli
- Running time: 74 minutes
- Production company: Metromedia Productions

Original release
- Network: ABC
- Release: December 3, 1974

Betrayal is a 1974 ABC Movie of the Week directed by Gordon Hessler and starring Amanda Blake and Tisha Sterling, adapted from 1973 the novel Only Couples Need Apply by Doris Miles Disney. It first aired on December 3, 1974.

== Plot ==
Helen Mercer, a wealthy elderly widow, hires a young woman, Gretchen Addison, as her secretary. Mercer, nicknamed "Deadeye" after having shot her criminal handyman, is lonely, and her ad for a secretary is as much about companionship as business. Little does she suspect, though, that the woman and her boyfriend Jay are criminals on the run after a killing, who target elderly women to extort them. The partners plan to make Mercer their next victim, killing her and stealing her money. Addison, however, grows to admire Mercer, and decides she needs to change her ways.

== Cast ==
- Amanda Blake ... Helen Mercer
- Tisha Sterling ... Gretchen Addison alias Adele Murphy
- Dick Haymes ... Harold Porter
- Sam Groom ... Jay
- Britt Leach ... Fred Hawkes
- Edward Marshall ... Roy
- Ted Gehring ... Police Sergeant
- Dennis Cross ... Highway Patrolman
- Eric Brotherson ... Mr. Hall
- Vernon Weddle ... Savings Officer
- Rene Bond ... Betty, waitress
- Lucille Benson ... Eunice Russell

== Critical reception ==
Journalist David Deal wrote in 2005 that the film was "mild in the terror department but the fears it depicts are very real nonetheless."
