= Ted Bergmann =

American film producer

- Born: Theodore Gerard Bergmann; September 12, 1920; Brooklyn, New York, U.S.
- Died: March 2, 2014 (aged 93); Santa Monica, California, U.S.
- Occupations: TV, radio and film screenwriter, producer, and network and advertising executive
- Years active: 1941–1998

Theodore Gerard Bergmann (September 12, 1920 – March 2, 2014) was an American television and radio producer, screenwriter, announcer, network and advertising executive. He worked for the Dumont Television Network in the 1940s and 1950s. He worked as producer and production manager for several other TV series from the 1970s through the 1990s.

== Career ==
In early 1947, after responding to an ad in the New York Times, Bergmann landed a job at the Dumont Television Network, where he was hired as a time salesman at WABD Channel 5, the Du Mont station in New York. Despite his inexperience he was hired on the spot. The first advertising sale he ever made was to the Jay Day Dress Company who sponsored Birthday Party, a children's daytime show, for $200 an episode. He was responsible for selling commercial advertising time to clients for such early Dumont TV shows such as The Original Amateur Hour, Captain Video and His Video Rangers, Cavalcade of Stars, and Life Is Worth Living. (He created the title for "Cavalcade of Stars"). Bergmann often had troubles finding advertisers for the network because the big television stars were being lured away from DuMont to the other networks.

Bergmann worked his way up through the company and finished as the managing director of the broadcast division until the network shut down. He was later offered a job to head the ABC network but declined. He remained good friends with creator of the DuMont Network, Allen DuMont, until DuMont died in 1965.

=== Production work ===
By 1976, Bergmann developed and was executive in charge of production for the ABC-TV sitcom Three's Company, serving in that capacity during the series' eight-season run. He also would serve in the same capacity for its spinoff series The Ropers and Three's A Crowd. He also would serve as the producer for the made-for-TV films Death Stalk (1970), Chelsea D.H.O. (1973) and The Good Ol' Boys in 1979.

== Later years and death ==
Bergmann retired from television in 1998 and resided in Southern California. He died after an unspecified surgery on March 2, 2014, aged 93.
