= Three's Company =

American television sitcom (1977–1984)

- Genre: Sitcom
- Based on: Man About the House by: Brian Cooke; Johnnie Mortimer
- Developed by: Don Nicholl; Michael Ross; Bernie West
- Directed by: Bill Hobin (seasons 1–2); Dave Powers (seasons 3–8); Various (seasons 2 & 8)
- Starring: John Ritter; Joyce DeWitt; Suzanne Somers; Norman Fell; Audra Lindley; Don Knotts; Richard Kline; Ann Wedgeworth; Jenilee Harrison; Priscilla Barnes
- Theme music composer: Joe Raposo
- Opening theme: "Come and Knock on Our Door", performed by Ray Charles & Julia Rinker
- Ending theme: "Come and Knock on Our Door" (instrumental)
- Country of origin: United States
- Original language: English
- No. of seasons: 8
- No. of episodes: 172 (list of episodes)

Production
- Executive producers: Michael Ross; Bernie West; Don Nicholl; Budd Grossman; George Burditt
- Production locations: Metromedia Square Hollywood, California (1977, 1982–1984); ABC Television Center Hollywood, California (1977); CBS Television City Hollywood, California (1977–1982)
- Camera setup: Videotape; multi-camera
- Running time: 25 minutes
- Production companies: NRW Productions; T.T.C. Productions

Original release
- Network: ABC
- Release: March 15, 1977 – September 18, 1984

Related
- Man About the House; The Ropers; Three's a Crowd

Three's Company is an American television sitcom that aired for eight seasons on ABC from March 15, 1977, to September 18, 1984. Developed by Don Nicholl, Michael Ross and Bernie West, it is based on the British sitcom Man About the House created by Brian Cooke and Johnnie Mortimer.

The series follows the antics of three single roommates: Jack Tripper, Janet Wood, and Chrissy Snow, who all platonically live together in a Santa Monica, California, apartment complex owned by Stanley and Helen Roper. The show, a farce, chronicles the escapades and hijinks of the trio's constant misunderstandings, social lives, and financial struggles. A top-10 hit from 1977 to 1983, the series has remained popular in syndication and through DVD releases. The show also spawned spin-offs similar to those that Man About the House had: The Ropers and Three's a Crowd, based upon George and Mildred and Robin's Nest, respectively.

== Synopsis ==
Florist Janet Wood (Joyce DeWitt) and secretary Chrissy Snow (Suzanne Somers) live in Santa Monica, California sharing a two-bedroom, one-bathroom apartment with their roommate Eleanor Garvey (Marianne Black). When Eleanor marries and moves out, culinary student Jack Tripper (John Ritter) crashes her going-away party at the apartment. He's found the next morning by Janet and Chrissy passed out in the bathtub. Needing someone to cover Eleanor's share of the rent, the women offer Jack the second bedroom. He quickly accepts so that he can have a place to live other than the local YMCA. Jack is attracted to Chrissy, but all three agree to (and do) live platonically.

However, overbearing landlord Stanley Roper (Norman Fell) refuses to allow unmarried men and women to live together in his building. He allows Jack to move in only after Janet tells him that Jack is homosexual. Stanley's wife, Helen (Audra Lindley), quickly figures out that Jack is actually straight, but she trusts him with the girls and promises to keep their secret from Stanley. Helen's bond with the three roommates grows throughout the series until the couple's departure, leading into the spin-off, The Ropers.

In 1979, Ralph Furley (Don Knotts) joins the cast as the roommates' new building manager. Early in season 5, with Chrissy away on an extended visit with her parents from which she would ultimately never return, Cindy Snow (Jenilee Harrison), Chrissy's first cousin, moves into the apartment. Cindy gets on-campus housing at UCLA in the first episode of season 6 and thereafter becomes a recurring character. Cindy is replaced in the apartment by Terri Alden (Priscilla Barnes), a nurse who had treated Jack for a severe cut in the emergency room the day Cindy moved out.

== Cast and characters ==
=== Main ===
- John Ritter as Jack Tripper
- Joyce DeWitt as Janet Wood
- Suzanne Somers as Christmas "Chrissy" Snow (seasons 1–5)
- Norman Fell as Stanley Roper (seasons 1–3; season 5, guest star)
- Audra Lindley as Helen Roper (seasons 1–3; season 5, guest star)
- Richard Kline as Larry Dallas (seasons 1–3, recurring; seasons 4–8, main)
- Don Knotts as Ralph Furley (seasons 4–8)
- Ann Wedgeworth as Lana Shields (season 4)
- Jenilee Harrison as Cindy Snow (seasons 5–6)
- Priscilla Barnes as Terri Alden (seasons 6–8)
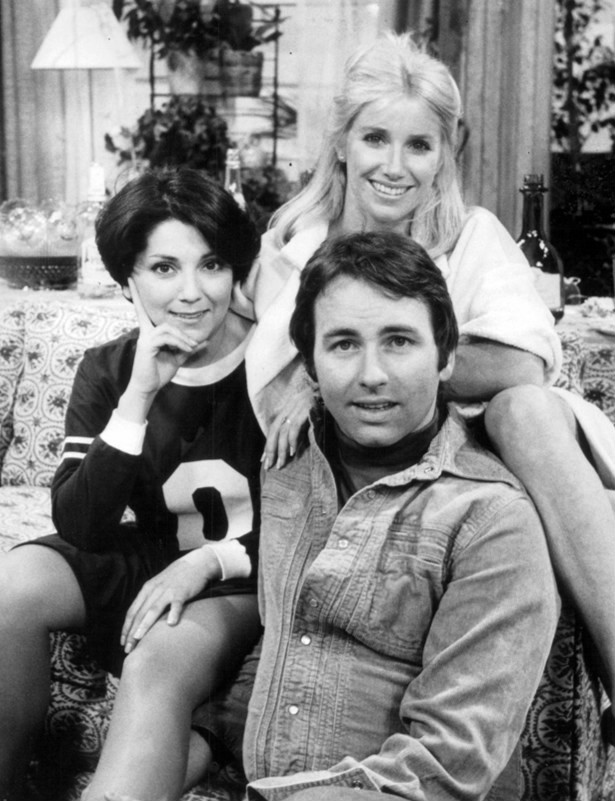
1977 series premiere photo

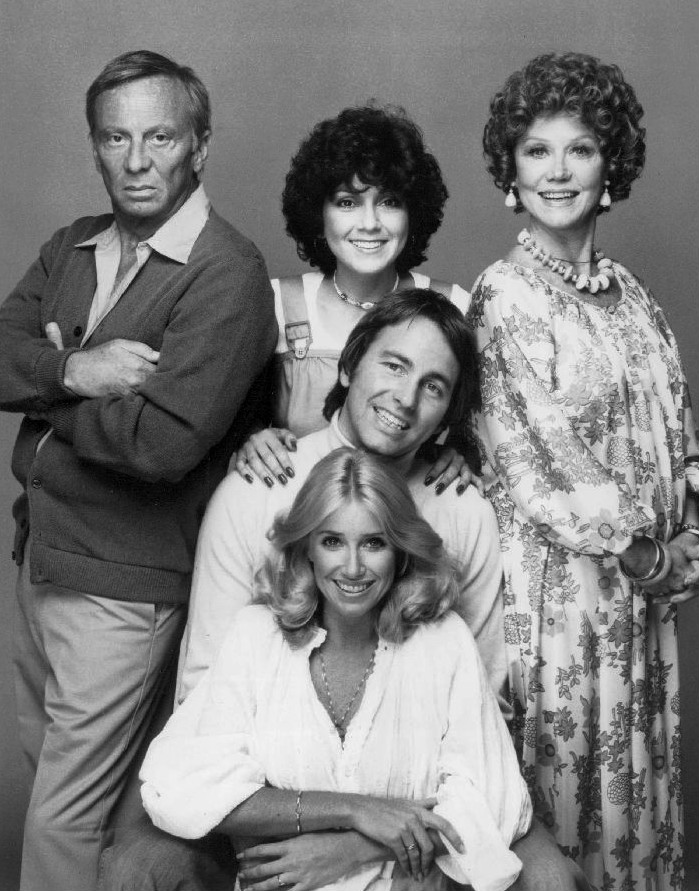
The trio with the original landlords, the Ropers, in 1977

=== Recurring ===
- Paul Ainsley as Jim, the bartender (seasons 1–4)
- William Pierson as Dean Travers (seasons 1–5)
- Peter Mark Richman as Reverend Snow (seasons 2–4)
- Gino Conforti as Felipe Gomez (seasons 5–7)
- Jordan Charney as Frank Angelino (seasons 5–8)

== Episodes ==
Season	Episodes	Originally released		Rank	Rating
Season	Episodes	First released	Last released	Rank	Rating
1	6	March 15, 1977	April 21, 1977	11	23.1
2	25	September 13, 1977	May 16, 1978	3	28.3
3	22	September 12, 1978	May 8, 1979	2	30.3
4	25	September 11, 1979	May 6, 1980	2	26.3
5	22	October 28, 1980	May 19, 1981	8	22.4 (Note: Tied with House Calls.)
6	28	October 6, 1981	May 18, 1982	4	23.3
7	22	September 28, 1982	May 10, 1983	6	21.2
8	22	September 27, 1983	September 18, 1984	33	16.8

== Background and production ==
=== Development ===
Famed Broadway writer Peter Stone tried to Americanize the British sitcom Man About the House. He originally set the series in New York, and he envisioned the male roommate as a successful, yet underpaid, chef in a fancy French restaurant, while the two female roommates were an executive secretary and a high-fashion model. When ABC's Fred Silverman read the script, he felt that middle America would not like the concept, and he decided to pass on the script. Silverman asked Larry Gelbart, creator and producer of M*A*S*H, for help with the series. At first, Gelbart wanted nothing to do with the show, feeling that its relatively simple premise made it substandard in comparison to M*A*S*H.

Ultimately, as a favor to Silverman, Gelbart developed a pilot episode with the help of his son-in-law, who named the series Three's Company. Gelbart's adaptation closely followed the British series. Gelbart named the male roommate David Bell, an aspiring filmmaker looking for a place to live and who just happened to be a great cook. The two female roommates were portrayed by Valerie Curtin who played Jenny, an employee of the DMV, and Susanne Zenor, who played Samantha, an aspiring actress. In Gelbart's version, the series took place in an apartment building called the Hacienda Palms in Hollywood, California. It was produced by Don Taffner and Ted Bergmann.

Silverman liked Gelbart's version, and ABC ordered a pilot, which was taped in early 1976. The format of the show just barely made it on to the fall 1976 ABC lineup, but the network later removed it for what network executives felt were more promising series. While ABC was considering how to re-shoot the pilot, CBS expressed an interest in the show. CBS made a firm commitment to producers Taffner and Bergmann to air the show with the Gelbart cast as a mid-season replacement in February 1977. At the last minute, ABC decided that it wanted the show after all, and made a firm commitment to air the show at mid-season with a new cast.

For help in remolding the show, producers hired Don Nicholl, Michael Ross, and Bernie West, writers who had worked on All in the Family, adapted from the British series Till Death Us Do Part. Their revised version of the pilot followed the British series even more closely. The male roommate changed from filmmaker David Bell to Jack Tripp (later changed to Tripper), a cooking student, similar to his British counterpart chef Robin Tripp. Aspiring actress Samantha became secretary Chrissy, (Note: The British series also had a character named Chrissy, although the American character bore more resemblance to the other British female character, Jo.) portrayed by Denise Galik. Galik was dismissed a couple of days before the pilot taped, and Susan Lanier replaced her. The other female roommate, DMV employee Jenny became Janet Wood, a florist, portrayed by Joyce DeWitt. They also moved the setting of the show from North Hollywood to the beachside in Santa Monica.

Nicholl, Ross, and West went on to conceive the show as an all out farce, building the show's plot line heavily on the many misunderstandings encountered by each of the characters. This pilot was actually a remake of the second episode of the British series, titled "And Mother Makes Four". The new concept was generally well liked, with the exception of Lanier's portrayal of Chrissy.

Despite the doubts about Lanier's portrayal as Chrissy, Silverman put the show on the network lineup, scheduled to air in March 1977. Meanwhile, he ordered a search for another actress to portray Chrissy. The day before production of the series began, Silverman desperately watched the audition tapes again, fast-forwarding through them quickly. Suddenly, he noticed Suzanne Somers's audition, which he hadn't seen previously. Silverman recognized Somers from her appearance on The Tonight Show, watched her audition and decided she was ideal for the part. No one on the production staff could give Silverman a straight answer why Somers had originally been rejected. Producers contacted her immediately, and she was on the set the next day.

At the last minute before the pilot taped, the producers considered whether to recast John Ritter. Although test audiences liked Ritter, the producers felt Ritter's foolish and clumsy portrayal of Jack made his character seem somewhat effeminate. Earlier in the casting process, actors such as Barry Van Dyke and future television director Michael Lembeck were considered for the role. Silverman was confident in Ritter, and he advocated that he remain on the show.

With Somers, Ritter, and DeWitt set in their roles, the third version of the pilot hastily went into production in January 1977. ABC accepted this version, and five additional episodes were filmed for the show's spring debut.

=== Filming ===
Three's Company was recorded at two locations: the first, seventh, and eighth seasons were taped at Metromedia Square and ABC Television Center, while the second through sixth seasons were taped in Studio 31 at CBS Television City. The cast would receive the script on Monday, rehearse from Tuesday to Thursday, and then shoot on Friday. Each episode was shot two consecutive times using different audiences and a three multicamera setup.

The taping was done in sequence, and there were rarely any retakes because the producers were strict. Priscilla Barnes once said, "Our bosses were very, very controlling. If my hair was too blonde, I'd get called up in the office."

The scenes in the opening credits with the trio frolicking on a boardwalk and riding bumper-cars were shot at the Santa Monica Pier, prior to the construction of the adjacent larger amusement park.

Producers shot a new opening sequence when Priscilla Barnes joined the show, featuring the new threesome and the other cast members riding a zoo tram and observing various animals around the park. These sequences were filmed at the Los Angeles Zoo in Griffith Park. During this sequence, a baby boy in overalls who approaches Janet while feeding the goats at the zoo was portrayed by Jason Ritter, John Ritter's oldest son. The exterior shots of the apartment building were filmed at 2912 4th Street in Santa Monica.

Of all the new sitcoms that premiered on ABC for the 1976–77 television season, only Three's Company and the summer premiere of What's Happening!! returned for a second season.

=== Cast changes ===
Three's Company had many cast changes over its run. The first of these changes took place in the spring of 1979 with the relocation of the Ropers to their own television series, which revolved around Helen and Stanley and their neighbors in a townhouse community after Stanley had sold the apartment building; it lasted for one and a half seasons. Man About the House had similarly spun off the Ropers for the series George and Mildred.

Three changes took place in the fall of 1979, at the beginning of the fourth season. The first was the addition of Lana Shields, an older woman who chased Jack. She kept pursuing him but he was unappreciative of her advances. Since Ann Wedgeworth disliked her diminishing role in the series, producers dropped Lana from the show with no explanation before mid-season. The second addition that fall was the new building manager, Ralph Furley (played by Don Knotts), whose brother Bart bought the building from the Ropers. Mr. Furley pursued Lana unsuccessfully, as she unsuccessfully pursued Jack. Unlike Lana, Mr. Furley remained until the end of the series. Third, Richard Kline as Larry Dallas, previously in a recurring role, was upgraded to a full cast member.

Season five (1980–1981) marked the beginning of contract re-negotiations and sparked friction on the set. Somers demanded a substantial increase in salary, from $30,000 to $150,000 per episode plus 10% of the show's profits. When Somers' demands were not met, Somers went on a strike of sorts. Executives believed that a complete loss of Somers could damage the program's popularity, so a compromise was reached. Somers, who was still under contract, continued to appear in the series, but only in the one-minute closing tag scene of a handful of episodes. Somers' scenes were taped on separate days from the show's regular taping; she did not appear on set with any of the show's other cast members. According to Somers, an off-hiatus contract with CBS as well as tension between her and producer Michael Ross led to her being fired, and her dismissal was on the personal level as she states that Ted Harbert confirms this. According to the story within the show, her character had returned to her hometown of Fresno to care for her ailing mother, and was only seen when she telephoned her former roommates and they recounted that week's adventures to her. This arrangement continued for one season. Somers' contract was not renewed and Chrissy's place in the apartment was taken by her clumsy cousin Cindy Snow (Jenilee Harrison).

Another replacement, Terri Alden (played by Priscilla Barnes), a clever, sometimes sassy nurse, joined the cast in the sixth season (1981–82). In the script, Cindy was to move to college to fulfill her dream of becoming a veterinarian and would continue to visit throughout the sixth season.

The show ended with the departure of all cast members except Ritter. Janet gets married and starts a new life, and Terri moves to Hawaii. Ritter moved on to the spin-off Three's a Crowd (syndicated as Three's Company, Too in the Three's Company syndication package), itself based upon the Man About the House spin-off, Robin's Nest.

After three decades of not speaking to each other, Suzanne Somers and Joyce DeWitt finally reconciled and reunited for Somers' web series Breaking Through, which aired February 2, 2012. Previously, Somers reconciled with Ritter just days before his death from aortic dissection on September 11, 2003. They had even discussed her making a cameo appearance on Ritter's new show, 8 Simple Rules.

=== Music ===
The theme song was composed by Joe Raposo (known for composing for the children's television shows Sesame Street and The Electric Company), and sung by longtime LA session musician Ray Charles and Julia Rinker. In the first pilot the melody was sung with a series of "doo doo doo" vocalizations rather than the final lyrics. The lyrics were written by writer-producer Don Nicholl.

== Themes ==
Humor in the show was based on farce, often relying on innuendo and misunderstanding, as well as physical comedy to punctuate the hare-brained schemes the characters would invariably conjure up to get themselves out of situations and dilemmas. Running jokes were frequently based on Jack's (supposed) sexual orientation, Mr. Roper's lack of sexual desire, and Chrissy's blonde moments. Conflict in the show came from the dysfunctional marriage of the Ropers, Janet's intolerance for a roommate romance, and later on, Jack's friendship with Larry and Larry's abuse thereof. Of all the characters, only Jack, Janet, and Larry appeared in all eight seasons of the series. Jack is the only character to appear in every episode; Janet appears in all but one episode (season 3's "Stanley's Hotline").

== Release ==
=== Home media ===
Anchor Bay Entertainment has released all eight seasons of Three's Company on DVD in Region 1. These are the original, unedited and uncut network television broadcast versions and not the edited versions which have been broadcast in syndication since the Fall of 1982. Some episodes include commentary as a bonus feature. Also, the season 2 set includes the first of the two unaired pilots as a bonus feature, while the season 3 set contains the other.

Anchor Bay released a complete series set on August 19, 2014. The set was subsequently re-released on February 13, 2018, this time by Lionsgate Home Entertainment.

On December 22, 2023, Visual Entertainment Inc. released the Official 40th Anniversary Collection of the series that also includes spin-offs The Ropers and Three's a Crowd.

=== Syndication ===
ABC aired back-to-back repeats of Three's Company during daytime from June 15 to September 11, 1981, at 11:00 a.m. EDT/10:00 CDT. The show has been in syndication since 1982 on local stations such as WNEW-TV (now WNYW) in New York City and the sales on the project realized more than $150 million, of which Thames took 12.5% ($19 million). It debuted on cable in 1992 on TBS and ran through 1999. Nick at Nite bought the show in 2000 and have a seven-year term with other Viacom networks such as TV Land and TNN. In 2007, Viacom renewed its contract for reruns of the show for another six years.

In March 2001, after being notified by a viewer, Nick at Nite quickly edited an episode ("The Charming Stranger") where John Ritter's scrotum skin was briefly visible through the bottom of a pair of blue boxer shorts. The most famous quip about this issue was uttered by Ritter himself, who told the New York Observer when they asked him about the controversy: "I've requested that Nickelodeon air both versions, edited and unedited, because sometimes you feel like a nut, and sometimes you don't" (quoting an advertising jingle for Almond Joy and Mounds candy bars). The incident was also brought-up during a "Celebrity Secrets" comedy bit on Late Night with Conan O'Brien in the late 1990s, in which a nervous-acting Ritter jokingly says, "Somebody asked me if I did that on purpose..." After taking a nervous sip of water, he responds, "You bet I did!"

Since 2011, the show has aired on Antenna TV where its spin-offs have also aired. Because the spin-offs cannot be stripped due to a lack of episodes for syndication, they are aired at the same time with the show. In Canada, DejaView (a Corus Entertainment property) re-airs the show.

In 2020, Pluto TV added the show to their channel lineup. and also made its IFC debut on November 27, 2020.

== Reception ==
Three's Company premiered in the spring, in the middle of the 1976–77 season. In the 1960s and 1970s, midseason television programs were often cancelled after their original six-episode run in the spring. Network observers did not believe that Three's Company would go anywhere after its first six episodes. They were proven wrong when it raked in record ratings, breaking barriers at the time as the highest-rated midseason show ever broadcast on network television. ABC gladly renewed the show for a formal television season, giving it a permanent primetime spot during the 1977–78 television season.

Ratings continued to climb throughout the years. The first episode, "A Man About the House", reached No. 28 for the week. The first episode to hit the No. 1 spot was February 14, 1978, when "Will the Real Jack Tripper..." was aired. The most-watched episode aired on March 13, 1979. It was titled "An Anniversary Surprise", and it centered around Stanley Roper selling the apartment, and the Ropers moving out. Immediately after the episode was the series premiere of the spinoff, The Ropers.

== TV movie ==
In May 2003, NBC aired a two-hour television movie entitled Behind the Camera: The Unauthorized Story of Three's Company, a docudrama featuring actors portraying Ritter (Bret Anthony), Dewitt (Melanie Paxson), Somers (Jud Tylor) and other actors on the series. The movie covered the entire run of the series, from the pilots to the final episode, but the contract negotiations and subsequent departure of Somers provided much of the drama. Dewitt co-produced and narrated the movie. Ritter and Somers both had some input, but neither appeared in the project.

== Film adaptation ==
In 2016, New Line Cinema began negotiations to obtain the film rights to Three's Company with Abby Kohn and Marc Silverstein penning the screenplay. Robert Cort and Don Taffner Jr. would produce the film and planned to have it set in the 1970s.

== Legacy ==
"Mrs. Roper Romps" likely began with the Southern Decadence event in New Orleans in 2013. The trend has reached nationwide status and led to The International Order of Mrs. Ropers, a group of local clubs whose members dress as Mrs. Roper or other characters from the series. A Tulsa, Oklahoma “Mrs. Roper Romp” on April 25, 2025 was held to benefit the homeless following a similar event in Yorba Linda, California. It prominently featured women wearing carrot-red frizzy hairstyles, big glasses, and caftans, similar to the Mrs. Roper character. The theme is said to be based on Mrs. Roper's warmth, humor and style, embodying bringing people together for a worthy cause.
