= Jud Tylor =

Canadian television and film actress (born 1979)

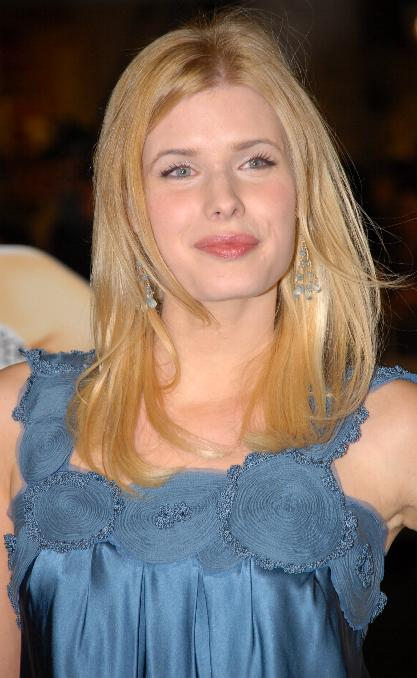
- Tylor in January 2008
- Born: March 24, 1979 (age 47); Vancouver, British Columbia, Canada
- Other name: Judy Tylor
- Occupations: Actress, model
- Years active: 1999–present

Jud Tylor (born March 24, 1979) is a Canadian television and film actress. She has had recurring roles in a number of television programs including That '70s Show and Edgemont.

== Career ==
Tylor was born on March 24, 1979, in Vancouver, British Columbia. She has had recurring roles in a number of television programs and films including the hit series That '70s Show (2005) as Samantha and a supporting lead alongside Academy award winner Tom Hanks and Julia Roberts in Charlie Wilson's War (2007). She portrayed Laraine Day alongside Chadwick Boseman in the Jackie Robinson story 42 (2013). Jud won critical acclaim for her portrayal of Suzanne Somers in Behind the Camera: The Unauthorized Story of Three's Company (2003) and was nominated in 2013 for best Canadian actress by the Canadian Screen Awards for her series regular role on HBO's Good God (2012).

== Filmography ==
=== Film ===
Year	Title	Role	Notes
2000	My 5 Wives	Stephanie	
2001	Suddenly Naked	Crystal	
2003	The Hot Karl II	Red	Video
2004	Freshman Orientation	Serena	
2007	What Love Is	Amy	
2007	Dead Tone	Karina	
2007	Charlie Wilson's War	Crystal Lee	
2011	Intervention: Cinderella	Snow White	Short
2013	42	Laraine Day	
2013	Shoes!	Flop (voice)	Short
2013	Defending Santa	Sarah Walker	
2016	A Boy Called Po	Beth	
2020	Psycho Party Planner	Marlow Meadows	
2020	Magic Max	Jennifer Barnes	Completed
TBA	Cult Cartel	Leona	Filming

=== Television ===
Year	Title	Role	Notes
1999	Viper	Secretary	Episode: "Tiny Bubbles"
1999	Y2K	Jane Bowman	TV film
2000	Ice Angel	Danielle	TV film
2000	The Fearing Mind	Stacey Hancock	Episode: "Come to Papa"
2001	Seven Days	Judy	Episodes: "Crystal Blue Persuasion", "The Final Countdown", "Sugar Mountain"
2001	The Outer Limits	Violet	Episode: "Flower Child"
2001	Andromeda	Satrina Leander	Episode: "Into the Labyrinth"
2001	Edgemont	Brenda	Recurring role (seasons 1–2)
2002	The Sausage Factory	Amy	Episode: "JC, the Gay Model"
2002	Smallville	Amanda Rothman	Episode: "Zero"
2003	Dawson's Creek	The 'Sure Thing'	Episode: "Castaways"
2003	Just Cause	Katie Dohrmann	Episode: "Dream House"
2003	Black Sash	Kim	Episode: "Jump Start"
2003	Behind the Camera: The Unauthorized Story of Three's Company	Suzanne Somers	TV film
2003	The Division	Angie	Episode: "Extreme Action Figures"
2005	CSI: Miami	Eve Martinkis	Episode: "Identity"
2005	The Collector	Angie	Episode: "The Superhero"
2005–2006	That '70s Show	Samantha Hyde	Recurring role (season 8)
2006	What About Brian	Lisa	Episode: "Pilot", "Two in Twenty-Four", "Moving Day"
2006	Ghost Whisperer	Sandy	Episode: "The Curse of the Ninth"
2007	Two and a Half Men	Deedee	Episode: "Dum Diddy Dum Diddy Doo"
2007	Dash 4 Cash	Dottie	TV film
2008	Raising the Bar	Lisa Landis	Episodes: "A Leg to Stand On", "Out on the Roof"
2009	Mad Men	Honey Stolich	Episode: "My Old Kentucky Home"
2009	The Forgotten	Layla Demchak	Episode: "Canine John"
2010	Cold Case	Lana Parker (1974)	Episode: "The Runaway Bunny"
2010	Chase	Emma Rothschild	Episode: "Above the Law"
2011	Carnal Innocence	Josie Longstreet	TV film
2011	Franklin & Bash	Amber North	Episode: "Franklin vs. Bash"
2012	Beautiful People	Susan	TV film
2012	Good God	Tory	Main role
2012	Level Up	Ms. Linenlooper (voice)	Episode: "Wanted"
2013	Perception	Tess Williams	Episode: "Defective"
2013	The Exes	Lauren	Episode: "My Ex-Boyfriend's Wedding"
2014	The Mentalist	Mae Feinberg	Episode: "Silver Wings of Time"
2014	NCIS: Los Angeles	Sarah Hill	Episode: "Deep Trouble: Part 1"
2014	Supernatural	Adina	Episodes: "Black", "Soul Survivor"
2014	Love Is Relative	Amber	TV film
2023	CSI: Vegas	Rose Cantwell	Episode: "Boned"
