= Don Nicholl =

American film producer (1925–1980)

Donald Nicholl (August 9, 1925 – July 5, 1980) was an English screenwriter and producer who later worked in the United States.

== Early life ==
Nicholl was born in Sunderland, England. He worked as a journalist, columnist, and publicist in England, and moved to the United States in 1968.

Nicholl's production company Nicholl Ross West (with Mickey Ross and Bernie West) wrote for the situation comedies All in the Family, The Jeffersons, and produced The Dumplings, Three's Company, and The Ropers.

== Legacy ==
He died of cancer in 1980. Nicholl's widow, Gee, set up the Don and Gee Nicholl Fellowships in Screenwriting program after his death.
