= Jack Tripper =

- Three's Company character
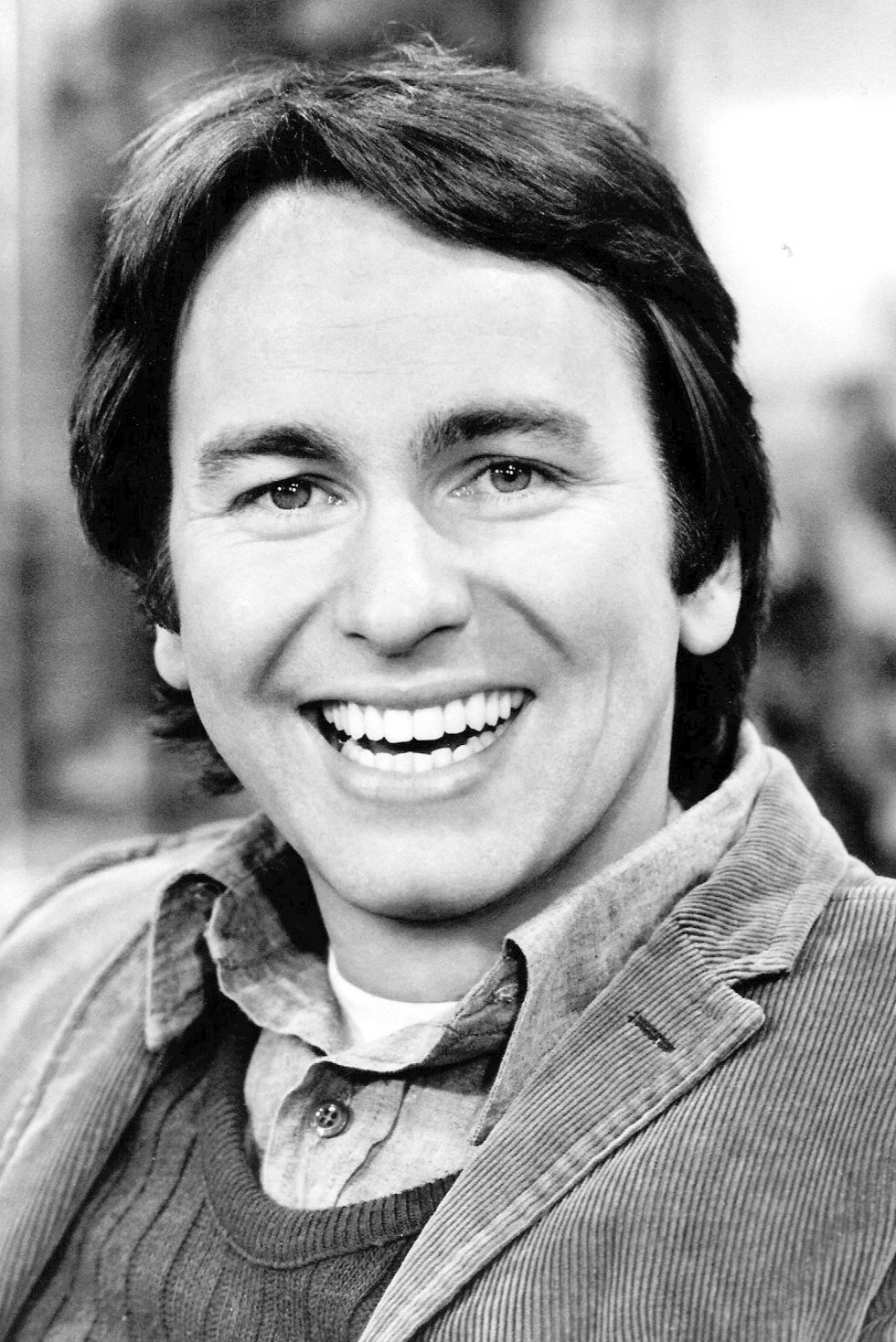
- Photo of John Ritter from Three's Company where he played the character Jack Tripper.
- First appearance: "A Man About the House" (in Three's Company) "Family Affair" (in Three's a Crowd)
- Last appearance: "Friends and Lovers" (in Three's Company) "A Star Is Born" (in Three's a Crowd)
- Based on: Robin Tripp from Man About the House created by Brian Cooke and Johnnie Mortimer
- Portrayed by: John Ritter

In-universe information
- Aliases: "Tinkerbell" "Jacky-boy" "Jocko"
- Gender: Male
- Occupation: Chef
- Family: Jack Tripper Sr. (father); Lee Tripper (brother); Fremont (uncle) unnamed mother

Jack Tripper is a fictional character on the sitcom Three's Company, which is based upon the character Robin Tripp from Man About the House created by Brian Cooke and Johnnie Mortimer. Jack was played by John Ritter.

== Fictional character biography ==
In the pilot episode, Jack becomes the new roommate to Janet Wood and Chrissy Snow, after they find him one morning in their bathtub, after he blacked out at the going-away party of their previous roommate. Janet reasoned with the landlord, Stanley Roper who lived downstairs and he agreed that Jack could stay because Janet told Mr. Roper that Jack was gay, without Jack's knowledge. Jack was, however, actually straight, and a recurring point of comedy in the series stemmed from his having to pretend that he was gay around Mr. Roper, and after the Ropers left the show, their replacement landlord, Ralph Furley. Jack is something of a ladies' man, but is also kind-hearted, loyal, and protective of the women he lives with.

In the show, Jack, a Navy veteran, attended a local technical college on the G.I. Bill for a degree in culinary arts, with a specialty in French cuisine. After graduating from cooking school, Jack held down odd jobs in his spare time. He got the chef job in Angelino’s restaurant, and shortly after, Jack got his own restaurant when Angelino decided to rent out another vacant building. Jack named his new restaurant Jack's Bistro, a name inspired by Mr. Furley's simple description of the establishment.
