= Strip programming =

Television and radio programming technique

Strip programming or stripping is a technique used for scheduling television and radio programming to ensure consistency and coherency. Television or radio programs of a particular style (such as a television series) are given a regular daily time slot during the week, so that it appears as a strip straight across the weekly schedule. For example, radio and television broadcasters may program a news program at rush hours every day, or at least every weekday.

Strip programming is used to deliver consistent content to targeted audiences. Broadcasters know or predict the times at which certain demographics will be listening to or watching their programs and play them at that time. Most television dayparts outside of prime time use strip programming five days a week (with some selected programs also being stripped on one or both days of the weekend), with the same programs being broadcast every day at the same time to target specific demographics. Strip programming is sometimes criticized as making programming too predictable, and reducing diversity and uniqueness.

== Overview ==
Strip scheduling often applies to any program that airs on multiple consecutive days during the calendar week (most commonly Monday through Friday), whether carried through a television network (such as with a talk show, variety show, news program, soap opera, or telenovela) or in syndication. It is commonly restricted to describing the airing of television programs that were originally broadcast on a weekly basis during their original run: The West Wing could be stripped but not Jeopardy!, as Jeopardy! was originally intended to be run daily. It can also refer to shows in prime time that run daily, such as with the short-lived The Jay Leno Show in 2009 and 2010.

For much of the 1960s and into the early 1990s, stripping for syndication was one of, if not the primary profit component of the studio production model in American television. A show became far more profitable if it succeeded in getting three full U.S. seasons (about 75 episodes) or more, as then it was possible to strip it for fifteen weeks (15×5=75) before needing to repeat episodes. Once a series attained five seasons (which would push the show over the 100 episodes threshold), it would be a full six months before it would repeat. For Star Trek, in particular, this was relevant. Only due to an unprecedented letter-writing campaign was the show renewed for its third season, and it did not begin to attain wider popularity until appearing in syndication for a number of years. If it had failed to be renewed for a third season, it would not have been syndicated, and its subsequent popularity and influence would likely not have occurred. Many other shows with lukewarm response in their initial runs became widely appreciated cult favorites as a result of syndication, or helped keep cultural memes associated with them far more widely known than if the shows had only been viewable during their initial time frame.

Michael Grade was responsible for introducing stripped and stranded schedules to the BBC's television service in the United Kingdom in his role as controller of BBC1: from February 18, 1985, onward, the weekday evening schedule has consisted almost entirely of half-hour or hour-long programs starting on the hour, or half-hour (the BBC channels never carried spot advertising). For example, Grade's new schedule provided at 19:00, the talk show Wogan thrice weekly and two episodes of EastEnders and fixed the national news at 18:00 and 21:00, and regional news at 18:30. Before this date, programs might start at almost any time and programs could have different times on consecutive weeks or even days, for example:

| Airtime | Programme |
|---|---|
| 17:40 | 60 Minutes (17:52 regional news, 18:15 national magazine) |
| 18:40 | Harty |
| 19:05 | Cliff! |
| 20:05 | Cockles |
| 21:00 | News |
| 21:25 | Whicker's World |
| 22:30 | Sportsnight |

Compare with a 2007 schedule for the same channel:

| Airtime | Programme |
|---|---|
| 18:00 | BBC News and Weather |
| 18:30 | Regional news program |
| 19:00 | Watchdog |
| 19:30 | EastEnders |
| 20:00 | Holby City |
| 21:00 | Judge John Deed |
| 22:00 | BBC News |
| 22:35 | Comedy drama |

Stripping has also become an even more common practice on many British channels since the introduction of multi-channel cable and satellite television in the 1990s.

In many other countries, new episodes of various series are aired every weekday. For example, if such a station gets the most recent season of a television series originating from the United States, the episodes will air in this way for two or three weeks, after which they are replaced by another show in the same timeslot.

In Australia, Network Ten and its sister station Eleven have stripped The Simpsons for many years, airing the show daily at 6:00 p.m., which is traditionally the news hour on rivals Seven Network and Nine Network. Despite some attempts to fill this slot with original programming, The Simpsons stripped at 6:00 p.m. remained a mainstay of Australian television, only ending when CBS Corporation took control of Ten and Eleven in 2017 and ended their output deal with 20th Century Fox Television. 7mate now carries it in various timeslots.

In the Philippines, Kapamilya Channel, A2Z, ALLTV and GMA Network are consistently airing It's Showtime on the same hours, at 12:00 p.m. until at 2:30 p.m., every Monday to Saturday.
