= Audra Lindley =

American actress (1918–1997)

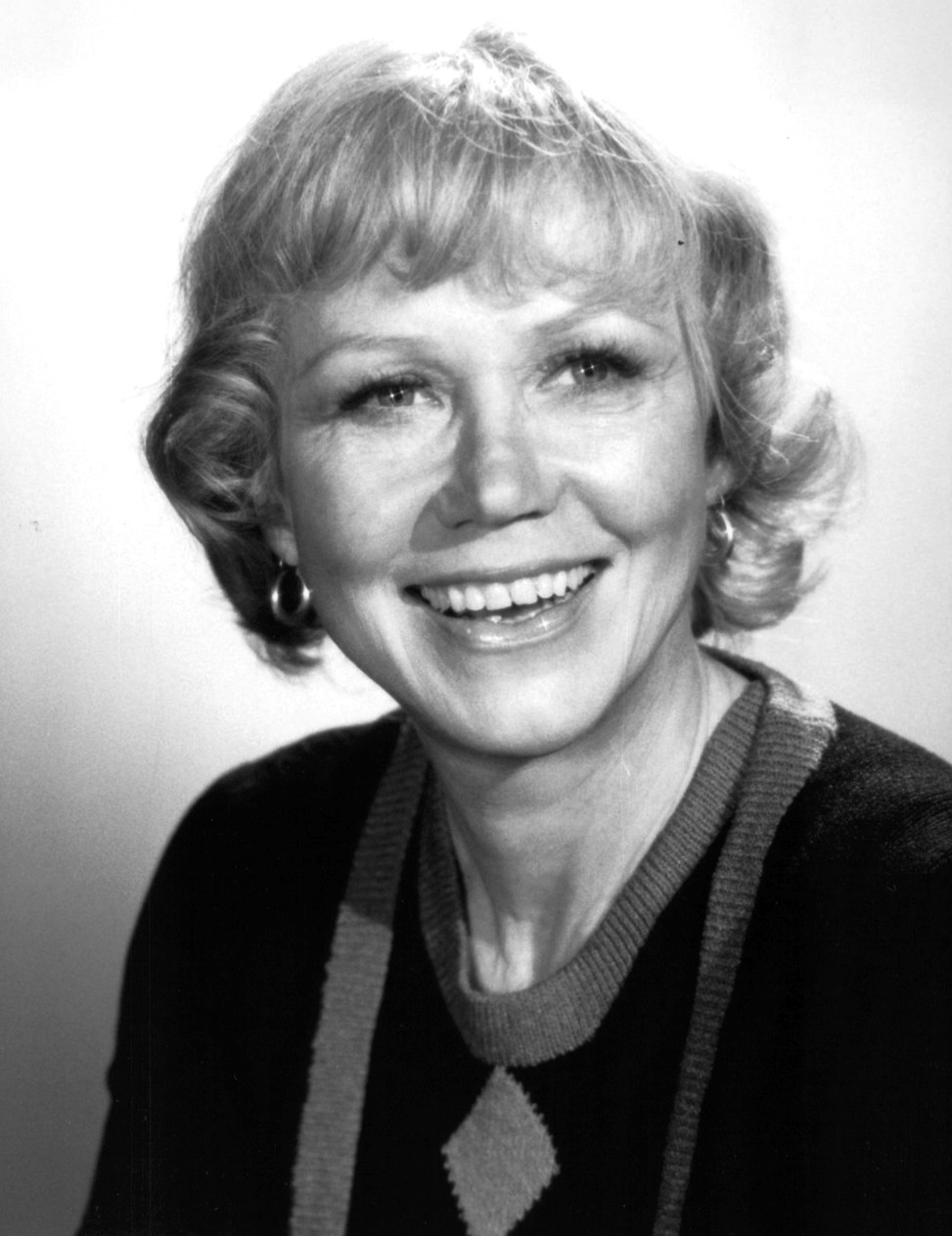
- Lindley in Fay (1975)
- Born: Audra Marie Lindley; September 24, 1918; Los Angeles, California, U.S.
- Died: October 16, 1997 (aged 79); Los Angeles, California, U.S.
- Resting place: Woodlawn Memorial Cemetery
- Occupation: Actress
- Years active: 1941–1997
- Spouses: Aaron Hardy Ulm (m. 1943; died 1970) James Whitmore (m. 1972; div. 1979)
- Children: 5

Audra Lindley (September 24, 1918 – October 16, 1997) was an American actress, most famous for her role as landlady Helen Roper on the sitcom Three's Company and its spin-off The Ropers.

== Early years ==
Audra Lindley was born in Los Angeles, California, on September 24, 1918. Her parents, Bert Lindley and Bessie Fisher Lindley, were actors (although she said, "My father wasn't very successful as an actor ...".) Her mother stopped acting when the fourth of their five children was born. Lindley was educated at St. Mary's Convent in Medford, Oregon; Holy Name Academy in Spokane, Washington, and Fairfax High School in Hollywood, California. After graduation she began studying acting in the Max Reinhardt Worshop.

== Career ==
Lindley's theatrical career began with a West Coast company headed by Reinhardt. She began acting on Broadway in 1942, portraying Judy Garrett in Comes the Revelation.

After a break from acting to raise five children, she began to make steady appearances on television in the early 1960s, including the role of Sue Knowles on the soap opera Search for Tomorrow, and a five-year stint as manipulative Aunt Liz Matthews on the soap opera Another World. She had regular roles as Meredith Baxter's mother in the sitcom Bridget Loves Bernie as well as Lee Grant’s best friend in Fay. Both series were short-lived.

In 1971, she starred in Taking Off, the first American film of Miloš Forman. She had guest roles on The Love Boat in 1977, 1978, 1979 and 1981 (pilot movie 3, season 1 episode 4, season 2 episodes 1 & 2, season 3 episodes 1 & 2, season 4 episode 18, and season 5 episode 10).

Her greatest fame came when she began playing the wisecracking, perpetually unfulfilled and sexually frustrated Helen Roper on the hit sitcom Three's Company (1977–79), in which she wore a wig to maintain her character's exaggerated hairstyle. The character and her husband Stanley, portrayed by Norman Fell, also starred in the spin-off series The Ropers (1979–80), which ran for two seasons.

She was nominated twice for a Golden Globe Award, in 1973 for her role in Bridget Loves Bernie and in 1979 for her role in Three's Company.

Lindley continued to appear steadily on television and in films, such as Revenge of the Stepford Wives in 1980 and as Fauna, the owner of a brothel in the 1982 film Cannery Row. In 1982, she appeared in the film Best Friends, starring Goldie Hawn and Burt Reynolds.

She played a supporting role in the lesbian-themed film Desert Hearts (1985). In 1987, she had another supporting role as Judith Light's mother in the TV movie Stamp of a Killer. She also appeared in 1989's Troop Beverly Hills as outspoken director of the Wilderness Girls. Also in 1989, she was the main character of an episode of the horror anthology series Tales from the Crypt.

In 1991, she starred in an episode of the horror anthology series The Hidden Room.

In 1995, she played Phoebe Buffay's grandmother, Frances, on Friends and appeared in the movie Sudden Death.

In 1997, some of her last roles include an episode of Nothing Sacred, the TV movie Sisters and Other Strangers, and the theatrical movie The Relic.

Her final role was as Virginia Sheridan, a recurring part as Cybill Shepherd's character's mother on the sitcom Cybill (having previously also played Shepherd's on-screen mother in the 1972 film The Heartbreak Kid). A later episode of Cybill was dedicated to her.

== Personal life and death ==
She was married to Hardy Ulm, with whom she had five children, from 1943 until his death in 1970. She was then married to actor James Whitmore from 1972 to 1979. (Another source says that she married Whitmore in 1971.)

Lindley died of complications from leukemia on October 16, 1997, at Cedars Sinai Medical Center. She was 79. She was cremated and her ashes buried in a grave near her parents at Woodlawn Memorial Cemetery in Santa Monica, California.

== Partial filmography ==
Year	Title	Role	Notes
1941	Manpower	Nurse	Uncredited
1941	One Foot in Heaven	Mother	Uncredited
1941	Dangerously They Live	Nurse	Uncredited
1942	The Male Animal	Student	Uncredited
1971	Taking Off	Ann Lockston	
1972	The Heartbreak Kid	Mrs. Corcoran	
1977	The Love Boat	Anita Wolfe	Season 1, Episode 4
1977–1981	Three's Company	Helen Roper	Season 1, 2, 3 & 5
1978	The Love Boat	Mrs. Worth	Season 2, Episodes 1 & 2
1979	When You Comin' Back, Red Ryder?	Ceil Ryder	
1979	The Love Boat	Portia Fairchild	Season 3, Episodes 1 & 2
1979–1980	The Ropers	Helen Roper	Season 1 & 2
1981	The Love Boat	Vanessa Norris	Season 4, Episode 16
1981	The Love Boat	Agnes Larrabee	Season 5, Episode 8
1982	Cannery Row	Fauna Flood	
1982	Best Friends	Ann Babson	
1985	Desert Hearts	Frances Parker	
1985	Zoo Ship		Voice
1988	Spellbinder	Mrs. White	
1988	Perry Mason: The Case of the Lady in the Lake		
1989	Troop Beverly Hills	Frances Temple	
1989	Tales from the Crypt	Anita	Season 1, Episode 6
1994	The New Age	Sandi Rego	
1994	Hart to Hart: Crimes of the Hart	Katherine Kendrick	
1995	Sudden Death	Mrs. Ferrara	
1995-1997	Cybill	Cybill’s Mother	
1995	Friends	Phoebe's Grandmother	
1996	Shoot the Moon	Blanche Gaskins	
1997	The Relic	Dr. Matilda Zwiezic	
