= List of people with synesthesia =

List of people with cross-wired senses

This is a list of notable people who have claimed to have the neurological condition synesthesia. Following that, there is a list of people who are often wrongly believed to have had synesthesia because they used it as a device in their art, poetry or music (referred to as pseudo-synesthetes).

Estimates of prevalence of synesthesia have ranged widely, from 1 in 4 to 1 in 25,000 – 100,000. However, most studies have relied on synesthetes reporting themselves, introducing self-referral bias.

Media outlets including Pitchfork have critically noted the considerable numbers of musical artists from the 2010s onwards claiming to be synesthetes, observing that "without literally testing every person who comes out in the press as a synesthete, it's exceedingly difficult to tell who has it and who is lying through their teeth for cultural cachet" and that claims of experiencing synesthesia can be employed "as an express route to creative genius".

== Synesthetes ==
Name	Type	Lifespan	Country	Profession	Notes	Source
Richard Feynman	grapheme-colour	1918-1988	United States	Physicist	"When I see equations, I see the letters in colors. I don't know why. I see vague pictures of Bessel functions with light-tan j's, slightly violet-bluish n's, and dark brown x's flying around."	
Georg Tobias Ludwig Sachs	Grapheme-colour	fl. 1812		Physician	Possibly first documented case	
Frank Iero	Chromesthesia	b. 1981	United States	Singer-songwriter, guitarist		
Tilden Daken	Multiple	1876-1935	United States	Artist	Painted to orchestral music.	
Syd Barrett	Multiple	1946-2006	United Kingdom	Singer-songwriter, guitarist, artist		
Suzuka Nakamoto	Sound to color	b. 1997	Japan	Singer		
Vladimir Nabokov	Grapheme-Color	1899-1977	Russia/United States/Switzerland	Novelist, poet		
Alessia Cara	Multiple	b. 1996	Canada	Singer-songwriter		
Beyoncé	Chromesthesia	b. 1981	United States	Singer-songwriter, record producer, dancer, actress		
Charli XCX	Chromesthesia	b. 1992	United Kingdom	Singer-songwriter		
Jennifer Cook	Multiple	b. 1975	United States	Author		
Marilyn Monroe	Taste to colour	1926-1962	United States	Actress		
Jack Coulter	Chromesthesia	b. 1994	United Kingdom	Artist		
Marina Diamandis	Multiple	b. 1985	United Kingdom	Singer-songwriter		
Patricia Lynne Duffy	Unspecified	b. 1952	United States	Author	Wrote Blue Cats and Chartreuse Kittens, the first book by a synesthete about synesthesia. Co-founded the American Synesthesia Association.	
Mary J. Blige	Sound to colour	b. 1971	United States	Singer-songwriter, actress		
Billie Eilish	Multiple	b. 2001	United States	Singer-songwriter		
Kanye West	Multiple	b. 1977	United States	Rapper, singer-songwriter, record producer, fashion designer		
Nikola Tesla	Chromesthesia	1856–1943	Austria/United States	Inventor		
Eves Karydas	Chromesthesia	b. 1994	Australia	Singer-songwriter		
Duke Ellington	Chromesthesia	1899–1974	United States	Composer, pianist, bandleader		
David Garner	Chromesthesia	1954-	United States	Composer		
David Hockney	Chromesthesia	1937-2026	United Kingdom	Artist, stage designer, photographer		
Greg Jarvis	Sound to shape	b. 1944	Canada	Musician	Founded the Canadian Synesthesia Association.	
Ramin Djawadi	Chromesthesia	b. 1974	Germany	Film score composer		
Billy Joel	Multiple	b. 1949	United States	Singer-songwriter, composer, pianist		
Bloem de Ligny	Multiple	b. 1978	Netherlands	Singer		
Franz Liszt	Sound to color	1811–1886	Hungary	Composer, pianist		
Lorde	Sound to color	b. 1996	New Zealand	Singer-songwriter		
Adi Meyerson	Unspecified	b. 1991	United States	Composer, Double Bassist		
Olivia Rodrigo	Sound to colour	b. 2003	United States	Singer-songwriter		
Tori Amos	Sound to color	b. 1963	United States	Singer-songwriter		
Ida Maria	Sound to color	b. 1984	Norway	Singer-songwriter		
Marian McPartland	Sound to color	1918–2013	United Kingdom/United States	Jazz pianist		
Bea Miller	Sound to color	b. 1999	United States	Singer-songwriter, actress		
Stephanie Morgenstern	Multiple	b. 1965	Canada	Actress, filmmaker		
Finneas O'Connell	Multiple	b. 1997	United States	Musician, record producer, actor		
Frank Ocean	Sound to color	b. 1987	United States	Singer-songwriter, producer, artist	Released Channel Orange in 2012, an album themed around his own synesthesia	
Adil Omar	Multiple	b. 1991	Pakistan	Singer-songwriter, record producer		
Andy Partridge	Multiple	b. 1953	United Kingdom	Singer-songwriter, musician		
Itzhak Perlman	Sound to shape	b. 1945	Israel/United States	Violinist, conductor, music teacher		
Jon Poole	Sound to color	b. 1969	United Kingdom	Musician		
Osmo Tapio Räihälä	Shape to sound	b. 1964	Finland	Composer		
Maggie Rogers	Sound to color	b. 1994	United States	Singer-songwriter, record producer		
Jean Sibelius	Unspecified	1865–1957	Finland	Composer, violinist		
Holly Smale	Emotions to color	b. 1981	United Kingdom	Writer		
Carol Steen	Multiple	b. 1943	United States	Artist	Co-founded the American Synesthesia Association.	
Daniel Tammet	Unspecified	b. 1979	United Kingdom	Author		
Brendon Urie	Multiple	b. 1987	United States	Singer		
Sabrina Vlaškalić	Multiple	1989–2019	Serbia	Classical guitarist		
Solomon Shereshevsky	Fivefold	1886-1958	Russian Empire/Soviet Union	Journalist, mnemonist		
Richard Wagner	Sound to color	1813–1883	Germany	Composer, theatre director, conductor		
Pharrell Williams	Sound to color	b. 1973	United States	Singer, rapper, songwriter, record producer, fashion designer		
Richard D. James	Unspecified	b. 1971	Ireland	Musician, record player, composer, remixer, DJ		
Hans Zimmer	Chromesthesia	b. 1957	Germany	Composer, music producer		
Olivier Messiaen	Chromesthesia	1896-1979	France	Composer, pianist, organist		
Awsten Knight	Sound to color	b. 1992	United States	Singer-songwriter, producer		
Sarah Kraning	Sound to color texture, and movement	b. 1992-93	United States	Visual Artist		
J57	Sound to color	b. 1983	United States	Musician		
Peter Steele	Chromesthesia	1962-2010	United States	Singer-songwriter		
Ryan Met (AJR)	Chromesthesia and sound to shapes/textures	b. 1994	United States	Musician, Songwriter, Singer, Producer		
Jack Met (AJR)	Chromesthesia	b. 1997	United States	Musician, Songwriter, Singer		
Angelina Curtis	Chromesthesia and sound to color	b. 2007	Australia	Musician, Songwriter, Singer, Actress, Australian Idol season 8 finalist		
Chuquimamani-Condori (Los Thuthanaka)	Unspecified	b. 1985	United States	Electronic music artist, poet, composer.		
Joshua Chuquimia Crampton (Los Thuthanaka)	Unspecified	b. 1983	United States	Musician, illustrator.		

== Pseudo-synesthetes ==
- Alexander Scriabin (6 January 1872 – 27 April 1915) probably was not a synesthete, but, rather, was highly influenced by the French and Russian salon fashions. Most noticeably, Scriabin seems to have been strongly influenced by the writings and talks of the Russian mystic Helena P. Blavatsky, founder of the Theosophical Society and author of such works as Isis Unveiled and The Secret Doctrine. The synesthetic motifs found in Scriabin's compositions – most noticeably in Prometheus, composed in 1911 – are developed from ideas from Isaac Newton, and follow a circle of fifths.
- Arthur Rimbaud may or may not have been a synesthete. He wrote a poem about vowels all having colours, but he might not have actually perceived graphemes in colour.

== See also ==
- Synesthesia in classical composers
