= History of synesthesia research =

Synesthesia is a neurological condition in which two or more bodily senses are coupled. For example, in a form of synesthesia known as grapheme-color synesthesia, letters or numbers may be perceived as inherently colored. Historically, the most commonly described form of synesthesia (or synesthesia-like mappings) has been between sound and vision, e.g. the hearing of colors in music.

== Early investigations of colored hearing ==
The interest in colored hearing, i.e. the co-perception of color in hearing sounds or music, dates back to Greek antiquity, when philosophers were investigating whether the colour (chroia, what we now call timbre) of music was a physical quality that could be quantified. The seventeenth-century physicist Isaac Newton tried to solve the problem by assuming that musical tones and colour tones have frequencies in common. The age-old quest for colour-pitch correspondences in order to evoke perceptions of coloured music finally resulted in the construction of color organs and performances of colored music in concert halls at the end of the nineteenth century. (For more information, see the synesthesia in art page).

John Locke in An Essay Concerning Human Understanding (1689) reports:

A studious blind man, who had mightily beat his head about visible objects, and made use of the explication of his books and friends, to understand those names of light and colours which often came in his way, bragged one day, That he now understood what scarlet signified. Upon which, his friend demanding what scarlet was? The blind man answered, It was like the sound of a trumpet.

— Locke, An Essay Concerning Human Understanding

Whether this is an actually synesthesia, or simply reflects metaphorical speech, is debated. A similar example appears in Leibniz's New Essays on Human Understanding (written in 1704, but not published until 1764); indeed given that the New Essays is intended as a rebuttal to Locke, it may even have been the same individual. Although it is mainly speculation, there is reason to believe that the person Locke referred to was the mathematician and scientist Nicholas Saunderson, who held the Lucasian professor chair at Cambridge University, and whose general prominence would have made his statements noticeable. In Letters on the blind, Denis Diderot, one of Locke's followers, mentions Saunderson by name in related philosophical reflections.

More recently, it has been proposed that Locke's "studious blind man" was his former Oxford classmate, and cleric, John Troughton (1637–1681), who was blinded by smallpox at a young age, was born early enough to be a plausible candidate (unlike Saunderson, who was only 7 years old in 1789), and who published a sermon on Revelations chapter 18, the only biblical chapter to mention trumpeters and the color scarlet, and who also preached on the color imagery in Song of Solomon, which Locke also discussed.

In 1710, Thomas Woolhouse reported the case of another blind man who perceived colors in response to sounds. Numerous other philosophers and scientists, including Isaac Newton (1704), Erasmus Darwin (1790) and Wilhelm Wundt (1874) may have referred to synesthesia, or at least synesthesia-like mappings between colors and musical notes. Henry David Thoreau remarked in a letter to Ralph Waldo Emerson in 1848 that a child he knew had asked him "if I did not use ‘colored words.' She said that she could tell the color of a great many words, and amused the children at school by so doing."

== 19th century investigations ==
The first agreed upon account of synesthesia comes from German physician Georg Tobias Ludwig Sachs in 1812, who reports on his colored vowels as part of his PhD dissertation (on his albinism), although its importance has only become apparent retrospectively. The father of psychophysics, Gustav Fechner reported on a first empirical survey of colored letter photisms among 73 synesthetes in 1871, followed in the 1880s by Francis Galton. These early investigations aroused little interest, and the phenomenon was first brought to the attention of the scientific community. Research into synesthesia proceeded briskly, with researchers from England, Germany, France and the United States all investigating the phenomenon. These early research years corresponded with the founding of psychology as a scientific field (see history of psychology). By 1926, Mahling cites 533 published papers dealing with colored hearing (or hearing → color synesthesia) alone.

Although there is still debate as to when the first international academic conference to seriously look at synesthesia took place, a likely candidate is the following: From 2 – 5 March 1927, Georg Anschütz (who was once a student of Alfred Binet) presided over the convening of the first Kongresse zur Farbe-Ton-Forschung (Congress for Color-Tone Research), in Hamburg, Germany. A second congress took place 1 – 5 October 1930, in Hamburg, Germany; the third from 2 – 7 October 1933; and the 4th and final conference in this series took place 4 – 10 October 1936.

In addition to drawing concerted scientific interest, the phenomenon of synesthesia started arousing interest in the salons of fin de siecle Europe. The French Symbolist poets Arthur Rimbaud and Charles Baudelaire wrote poems which focused on synesthetic experience. Baudelaire's Correspondances (1857) (full text available here) introduced the Romantic notion that the senses can and should intermingle. Kevin Dann argues that Baudelaire probably learned of synesthesia from reading medical textbooks that were available in his home, and it is generally agreed that neither Baudelaire, nor Rimbaud were true synesthetes. Rimbaud, following Baudelaire, wrote Voyelles (1871) (full text available here) which was perhaps more important than Correspondances in popularizing synesthesia. Numerous other composers, artists and writers followed suit, making synesthesia well known among the artistic community of the day.

Due to the difficulties in assessing and measuring subjective internal experiences, and the rise of behaviorism in psychology, which banished any mention of internal experiences, the study of synesthesia gradually waned during the 1930s. Marks lists 44 papers discussing colored hearing from 1900 to 1940, while in the following 35 years from 1940 to 1975, only 12 papers were published on this topic. Cretien van Campen graphed the number of publications in the period 1780 – 2000 and noticed a revival of synesthesia studies from the 1980s.

== Modern research ==
In the 1980s, as the cognitive revolution had begun to make discussion of internal states and even the study of consciousness respectable again, scientists began to once again examine this fascinating phenomenon. Led by Lawrence E. Marks and Richard Cytowic in the United States, and by Simon Baron-Cohen and Jeffrey Gray in England, research into synesthesia began by exploring the reality, consistency and frequency of synesthetic experiences. In the late 1990s, researchers began to turn their attention towards grapheme-color synesthesia, one of the most common and easily studied forms of synesthesia. In 2006, the journal Cortex published a special issue on synesthesia, composed of 26 articles from individual case reports to functional neuroimaging studies of the neural basis of synesthesia. Synesthesia has been the topic of several recent scientific books and novels and a recent short film has even included characters who experience synesthesia (for more information, see the main synesthesia page).

Mirroring these developments in the professional community, synesthetes and synesthesia researchers have come together to found several societies dedicated to research and education about synesthesia, its consequences and uses. In 1995, the American Synesthesia Association was founded, and has been having annual meetings since 2001. In England, the UK Synaesthesia Association, arose out of a similar desire to bring together synesthetes and the people who study them, and has held two conferences (in 2005 and 2006). Similarly, since its inception in 1993, Sean A. Day has administered the "synesthesia list", an e-mail list for synesthetes and researchers around the world. With increased scientific knowledge and public outreach, awareness of this condition is growing worldwide.

== See also ==
- American Synesthesia Association
- UK Synaesthesia Association
