= Tilden Daken =

American landscape painter (1876–1935)

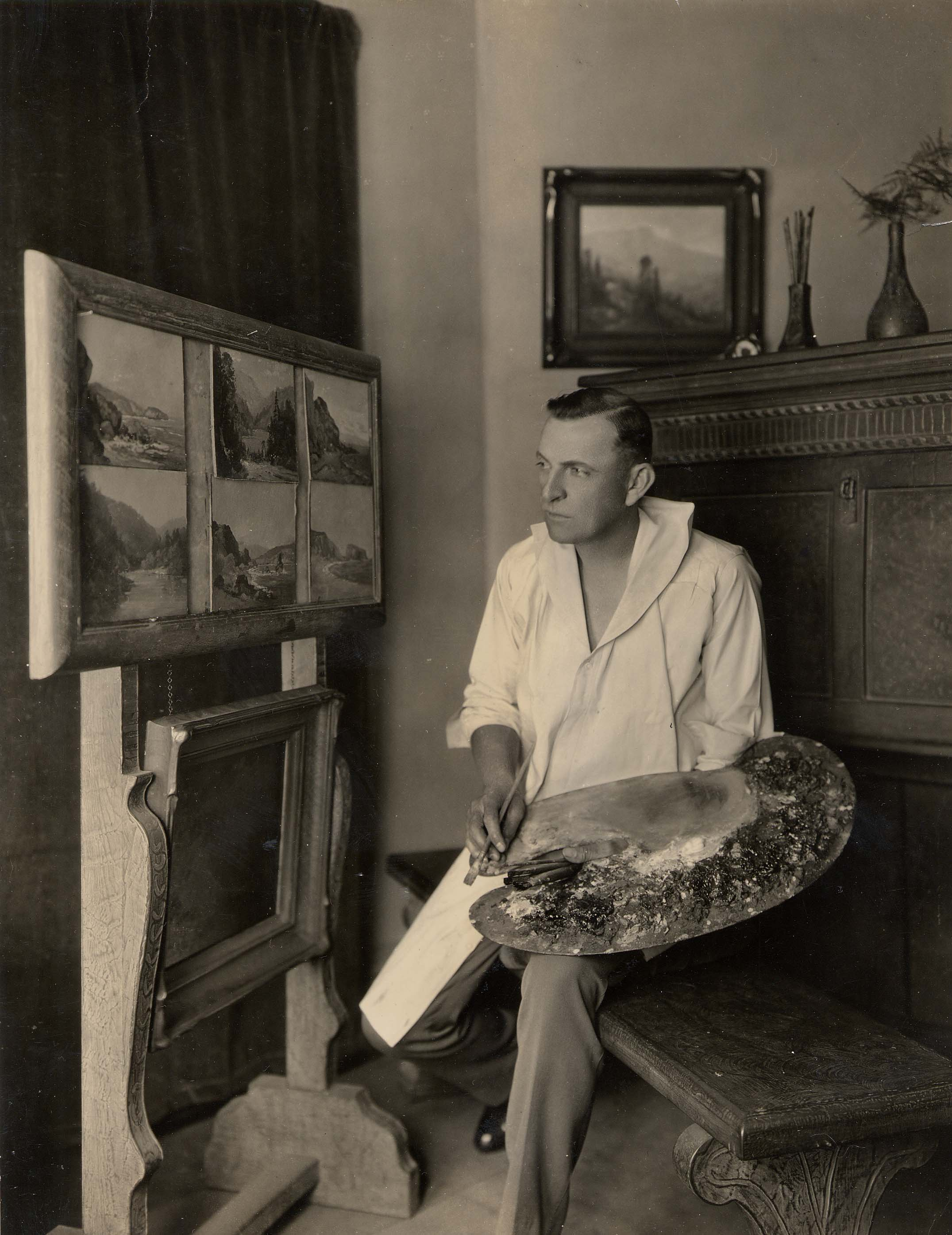
- Tilden Daken, c. 1928, painting in his studio in Mill Valley, California
- Born: Samuel Tilden Daken; June 14, 1876; Bunker Hill, Illinois
- Died: April 24, 1935 (aged 58); Georgetown, California
- Other names: Tilden Dakin; S.T. Daken; S. Tilden Daken
- Known for: Landscape and mural painting
- Spouses: Mary Elizabeth Duplissea (m. 1903; div. 1918); Florence Kainer (m. 1925)
- Children: Edith May Daken; Sydney Tilden Daken
- Parents: Henry Daken Sr. (father); Dorliska Weeks (mother)

Signature
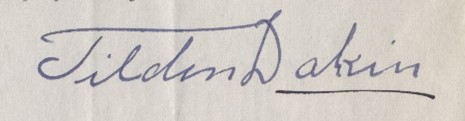

Tilden Daken (June 14, 1876 – April 24, 1935) was an American landscape painter known primarily for his oil paintings of the California redwoods, the Sierra Nevada mountains, and the countryside scenery of Northern California and Southern California. He also painted in Alaska, Mexico, Baja, the Hawaiian Islands, the South Seas, and parts of the East Coast of the United States.

Between 1900 and 1930, Daken was associated with the California Impressionism art movement in which artists painted out of doors en plein air in California. Daken was primarily influenced by the genres of Tonalism, the American Barbizon school, and Academic Art. Principally self-taught, he began his career painting frescos, murals, and stage curtains.

Daken exhibited in the leading galleries of the day in New York, Chicago, Cincinnati, Los Angeles, and San Francisco, and at the 1915 Panama-Pacific International Exposition. His works are held by at least eight museums and he is mentioned in over a dozen books. Art historian Edan Milton Hughes estimated Tilden Daken painted more than 4000 works.

Named Samuel Tilden Daken at birth, at about the age of forty he dropped his first name, changed the spelling of his surname to Dakin, and signed his works Tilden Dakin. His earlier signature styles: S.T. Daken and S. Tilden Daken.

"Dakin . . . presents no apologies for painting nature as he sees it, and in consequence his canvasses glow with all the color of the California hills and valleys. His pictures have the mellowness of a [William] Keith, and the warmth of a [Thaddeus] Welch. He has the feeling for grandeur of the Sierras which gave to Tom Hill [Thomas Hill] his fame. Dakin is an artist who ventures far afield. . .. Perhaps [he] will not like to be called a poet — some painters don't. Yet because he is so different in most ways from the modernist craftsman, perhaps he will let it go by this once."

— California art critic Harry Noyes Pratt on Daken, Mill Valley Record, May 21, 1927

== Celebrity ==
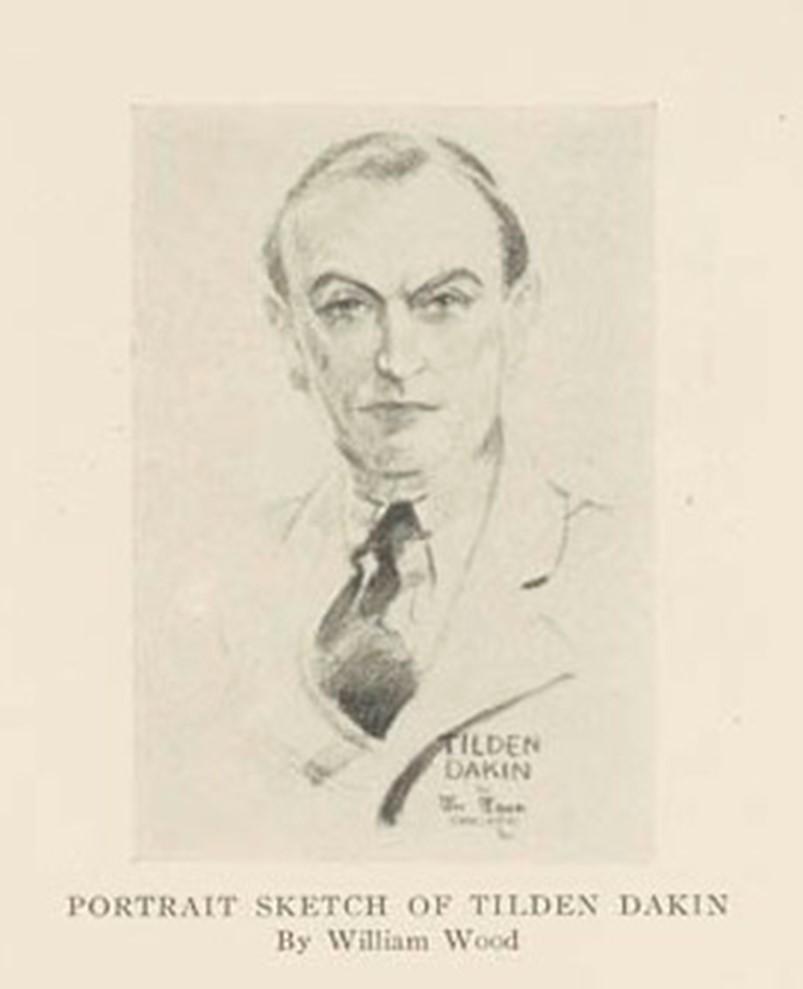
Drawing of Daken by William Wood, 1930.

Famous in his day, Daken's every movement was tracked by the press, revealing the social, cultural, and political times in which he lived and the noted personalities of the era with whom he mingled: bohemians, revolutionists, politicians, fellow artists, writers, musicians, and Hollywood film stars and directors: Jack London, American novelist, journalist, and social activist; James D. Phelan, San Francisco Mayor and United States Senator; vaudeville star Sophie Tucker, with whom Daken had an affair; Aline Barnsdall, who built the Hollyhock House on Olive Hill in East Hollywood; Aimee Semple McPherson, the Los Angeles Pentecostal evangelist and national celebrity; director Hal Roach, best known for his "Laurel and Hardy" and "Our Gang" ("The Little Rascals") comedy series; silent film star Virginia Lee Corbin; and others of the film world. He also befriended a number of fellow Impressionists, including: William Keith, the Scottish-American Early California Artist whom Daken long considered his mentor; watercolorist Lorenzo Latimer; Mary S. Morrow, whom Daken tutored; Maurice Logan, member of the Society of Six; Impressionist Thaddaeus Welch; Impressionist and photographer Clyde Eugene Scott; Eugene Califano and Jack Califano (two of the twelve sons of the celebrated Italian painter John Edmund Califano); and Impressionists Carl Sammons, Arthur William Best; Clarkson Dye; and Paul Lauritz.

== Life ==
=== Early years and family ===
The youngest of five children, Daken was born in 1876 in Bunker Hill, Illinois. In 1879, the family immigrated to Sacramento, California. Born and raised in humble circumstances, Daken was unschooled, mined for gold with his father in the Sierra Nevada Mother Lode, and developed an early passion for classical music, nature, and painting en plein air. At the age of nine, he apprenticed as a decorator and interior painter, and by his teens was a fresco painter in San Francisco. In 1903, Daken married native San Franciscan Mary "May" Elizabeth Duplissea. That same year in San Francisco, Daken opened a studio on Van Ness Avenue, destroyed three years later in the 1906 San Francisco earthquake and fire, along with an untold number of his paintings. In the summer of 1906, the Dakens moved to Glen Ellen, California. They lived at the Mineral Springs and Health Resort on Sonoma Creek, where their two daughters were born.

=== Sonoma County years (1906-1912) ===
In Glen Ellen, California, Daken rekindled his friendship with Jack London. He and London had first met in 1901 in the Reno Station in Nevada and together rode the brake beams of a freight car on the Union Pacific Railroad to Oakland, California. Daken often painted at Jack London's Beauty Ranch in Glen Ellen, now the Jack London State Historic Park. In 1909, the Daken family moved to nearby Santa Rosa, California, where Daken was appointed head of the art department at Ursuline College for two years.

=== San Francisco, Mexico, PPIE, Lake Tahoe (1912-1922) ===
In 1912, the Dakens left Sonoma County and returned to San Francisco, where Daken opened a studio on Gough Street. In mid-1913, during the Mexican Revolution, Daken left his family and moved to Mexico to paint and scout material for San Francisco's 1915 Panama-Pacific International Exposition (PPIE). In Mazatlán, he made hundreds of charcoal drawings and painted numerous scenes of the Sierra Madre Mountains in the red palette. In 1914, in or around Mazatlán, he was shot three times and held a prisoner of war for two months, at the height of the disputes between Venustiano Carranza and Pancho Villa. After nearly two years in Mexico, he returned to San Francisco and exhibited the "Mexican Exhibit" in the Palace of Agriculture at the 1915 Panama-Pacific International Exposition, including his mural El Rosario River of the West Coast of Mexico. In 1918, Daken divorced May Duplissea Daken amid scandal and publicized court proceedings. In 1922, Daken spent months in the Lake Tahoe region, resulting in a collection of 100 works, painted in diverse seasons, which he exhibited as the "Northern California Alps" collection.

=== Hollywood Years (1923-1925) ===
In early 1923, Daken moved to Hollywood, where he hobnobbed with film stars, directors, and other noted personalities of the era. He leased a home and studio in Corte de Linda Vista, a cluster of Spanish-inspired garden bungalows on Hayworth Avenue, today known as West Hollywood. Daken is best known during his Hollywood years for his paint-to-music genre which he performed on stage in various venues including the Los Angeles Chamber of Commerce. In 1923, Daken embarked on a trip to New Guinea to paint the headhunters. He was accompanied by Andrew Hooten Blackiston, an anthropologist and lawyer who donated some of his archeological finds to Smithsonian museums.

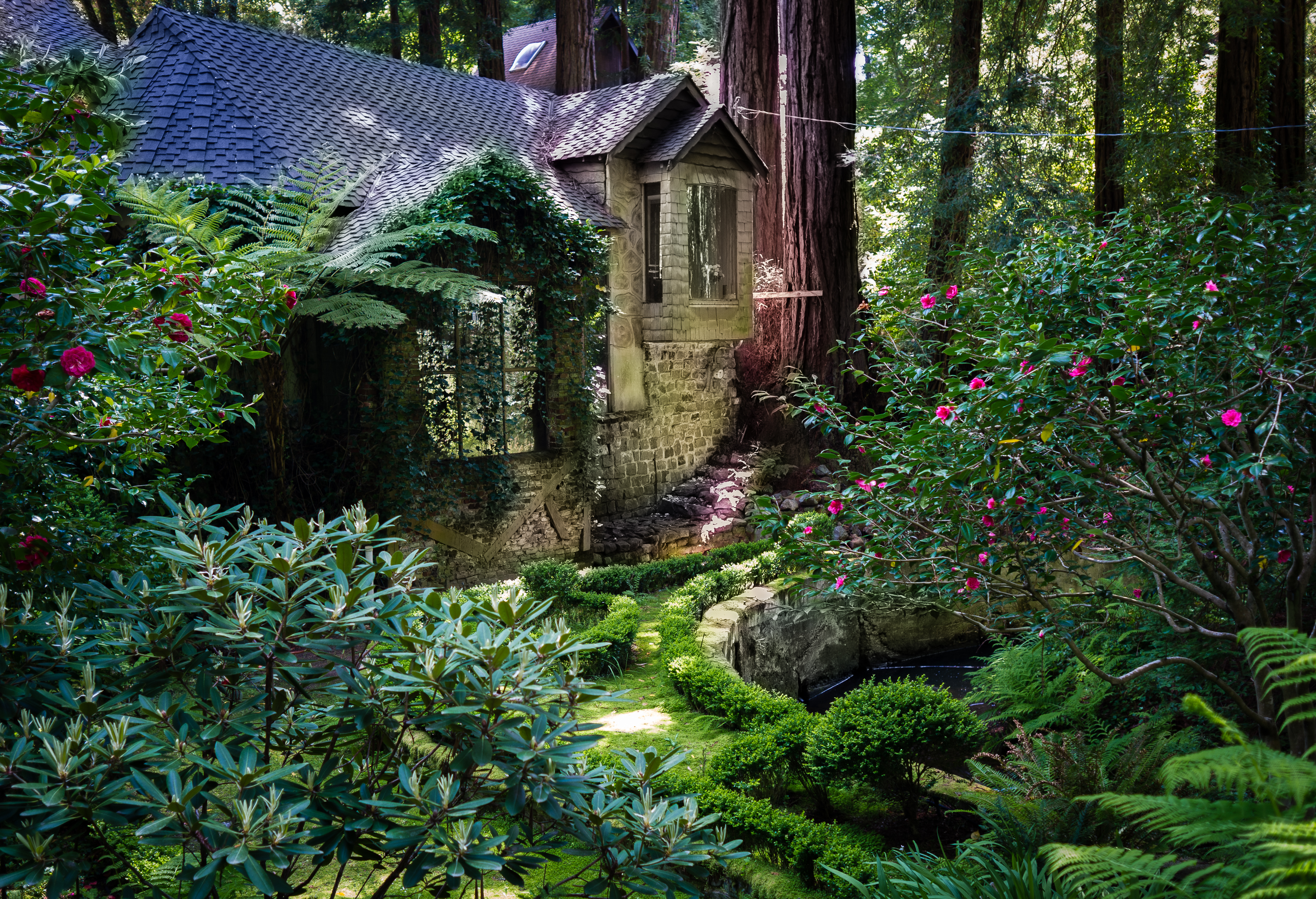
The home Daken built in Mill Valley in 1925.

=== Marin County Years (1925-1930) ===
In 1925, Daken returned to Northern California and married his second wife, Florence Kainer. In the town of Mill Valley, he built a home and studio amongst the redwoods in the style of the arts and crafts movement. In early 1930, at the onset of the Great Depression, Daken lost his Mill Valley home in foreclosure.

=== Cross Country and the Mother Lode (1930-1934) ===
In 1930, the Dakens embarked on a cross-country trip during which Daken painted and exhibited in galleries in Chicago, Cincinnati, and New York City. The couple lived in Greenwich Village in New York City for fourteen months. In 1932, the Dakens returned to California. Intending to return to San Francisco when the Depression waned, they lived for a year in a mining camp near Yosemite in Bootjack, California. In early 1933, they moved to Georgetown, California, where Daken had mined in his youth.

=== Death ===
In early 1935, while living in Georgetown, California, Daken was stricken with cancer at the age of fifty-eight. He died on April 25, 1935, and is buried in the historic Georgetown Pioneer Cemetery, founded at the onset of the California Gold Rush.

== Legacy ==
=== Painter of the Redwoods ===
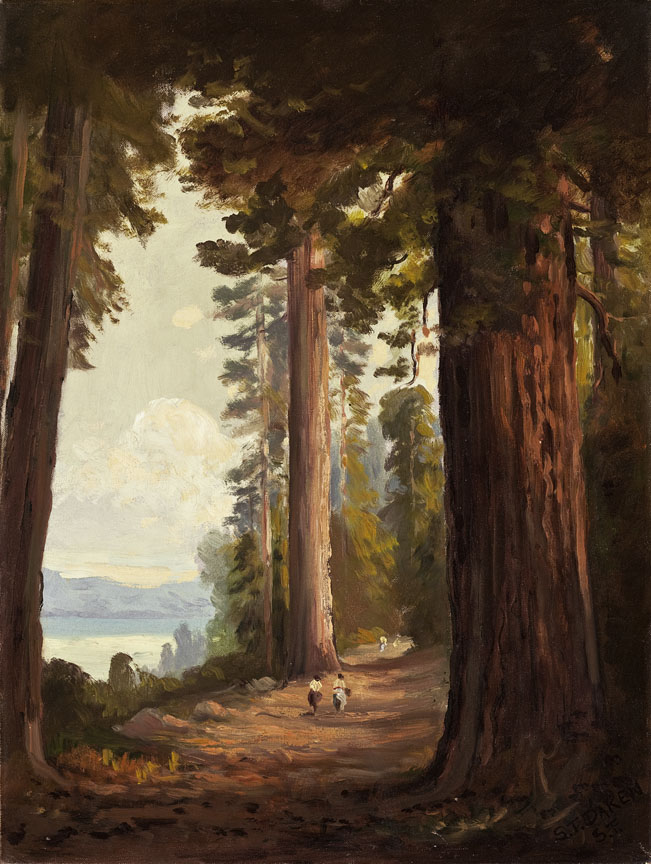
"Stroll Through the Redwoods," The Russian River, 1911.

Daken is perhaps best known for his paintings of the California redwoods, the giant sequoias and coast redwoods. "Genius, it has been said for lo these many years, is the infinite capacity of taking pains. Tilden Dakin . . . declares he spent four years studying the redwood tree before submitting a single canvas." He "painted in every grove in the state," he told a journalist, most prolifically at Muir Woods National Monument, Calaveras Big Trees State Park, Big Basin Redwoods State Park, Armstrong Redwoods State National Reserve, the Russian River in Sonoma County, Tahoe National Forest, Mariposa Grove in Yosemite, Sequoia National Park, and Kings Canyon National Park. In the early 1920s, Daken campaigned to protect the redwoods from the lumber trade and joined forces with Save the Redwoods League, founded in 1918.

=== Painter of the State and National Parks ===
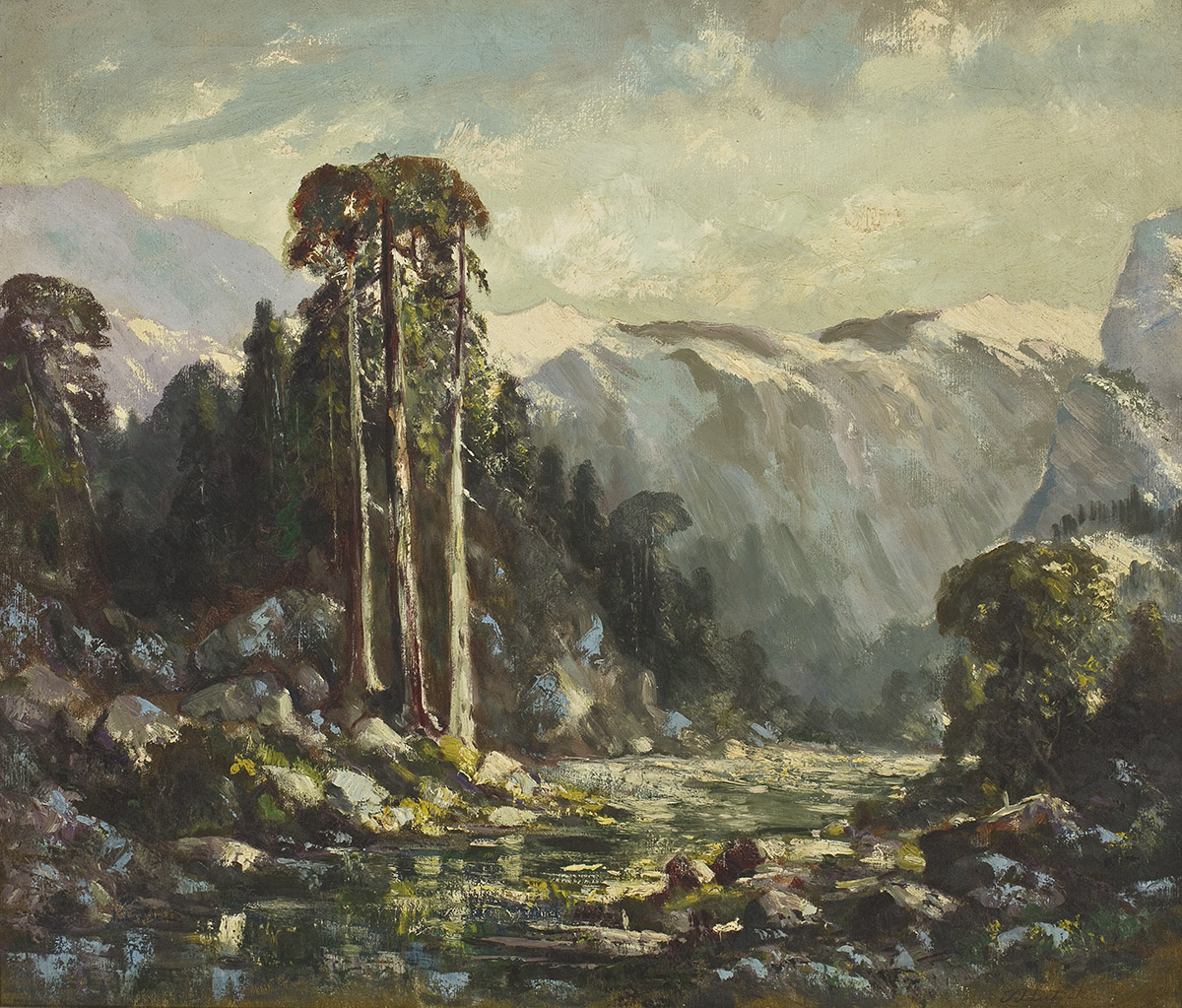
"Piute Pass," c. 1924.

Daken painted in over two dozen federal and state parks, forests, and monuments in the western region of the United States including Tahoe National Forest and Yosemite National Park. In 1922, he embarked on a months-long winter trek into the Lake Tahoe region in the Sierra Nevada, resulting in an assemblage of 100 High Sierra works titled the "Northern California Alps" collection. In the 1924, Daken led a two-month art expedition into Piute Pass in the John Muir Wilderness, joined by a cameraman and fifteen fellow Impressionists. In 1926, he led a second group of artists into the Rogue River and McKenzie Pass regions of Oregon. Daken wrote "Experiences in the Rugged West," a short story about his eight-week mining trip and surviving an avalanche in the Sierra Nevada mountains, published in 1928 in The Wasp, a San Francisco weekly tabloid.

=== Painter of the Valley of the Moon ===
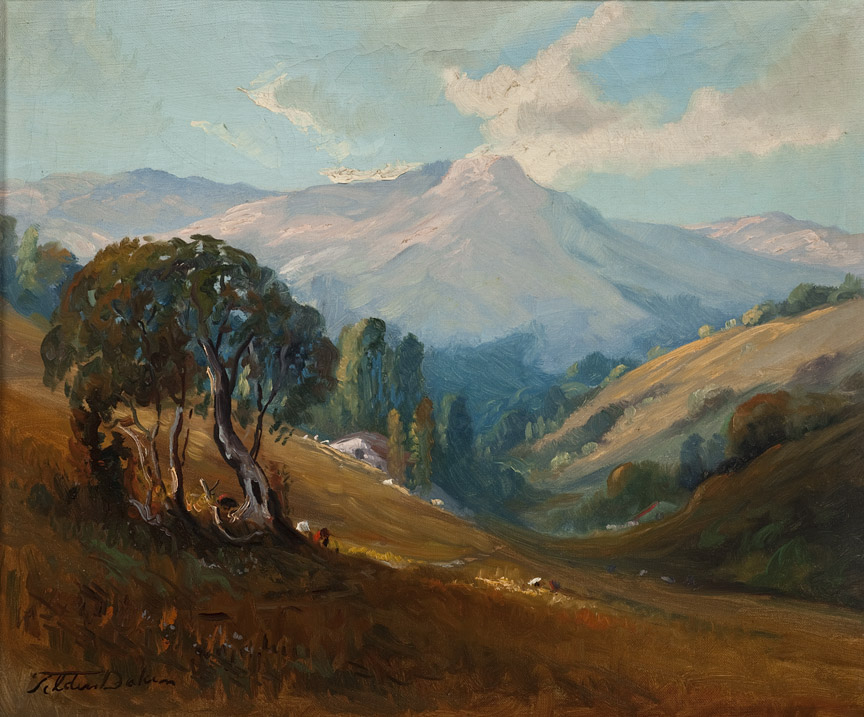
"Valley of the Moon," c. 1918.

During his six years in Sonoma County, Daken painted hundreds of scenes of the Valley of the Moon. In part due to his friendship with Jack London, and the author's famous novel, "The Valley of the Moon" (1913), Daken became known as the "Painter of the Valley of the Moon."

=== The Submarine Artist ===
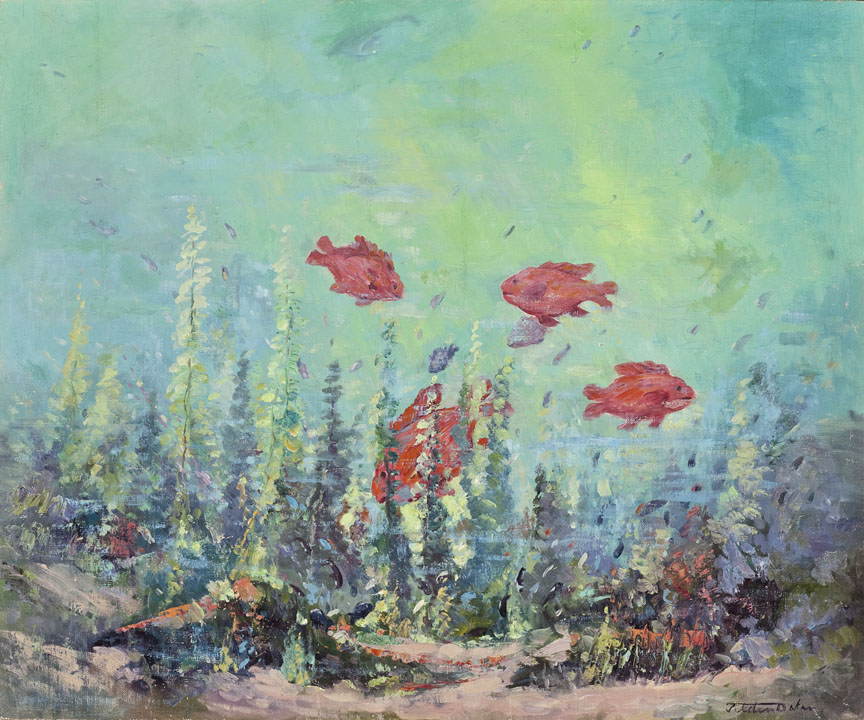
"Fishes' Paradise," c. 1925, painted in the Pacific Ocean in his diving bell

Early in his fine art career, Daken studied Marine Art under the tutelage of Russian-born sea painter, Herman Richard Dietz (1869–1923). While Daken did not pursue traditional Marine Art, a form of painting that portrays or draws its main inspiration from the sea, he practiced freediving in the Pacific Ocean to view underwater scenery to paint from memory. He subsequently built a custom-designed diving bell, known as the "Submarine Studio," in which to capture underwater scenes in the Pacific. He was the first painter of his time to attempt such a feat. He submerged his diving bell to in Point Reyes and Tomales Bay in Marin County, the Channel Islands of Southern California, and in Todos Santos, Baja California Sur. In 1926, Daken told a Sunset Magazine reporter: "The bottom of the sea is a world of incessant warfare, and many a time I have been compelled to lay down my brushes and watch the outcome of a tragedy. I never have had any serious trouble, though once a large octopus nearly succeeded in turning over my steel box." in 1926, Daken wrote "In the Grip of an Octopus," a short story about his underwater adventures, published in 1926 in The Wide World Magazine and in 1927 in newspapers from Los Angeles to Boston and in Canada. He created at least 100 underwater paintings in his diving bell and exhibited them in San Francisco, Los Angeles, Chicago, and New York.

=== The Key of Red Artist ===
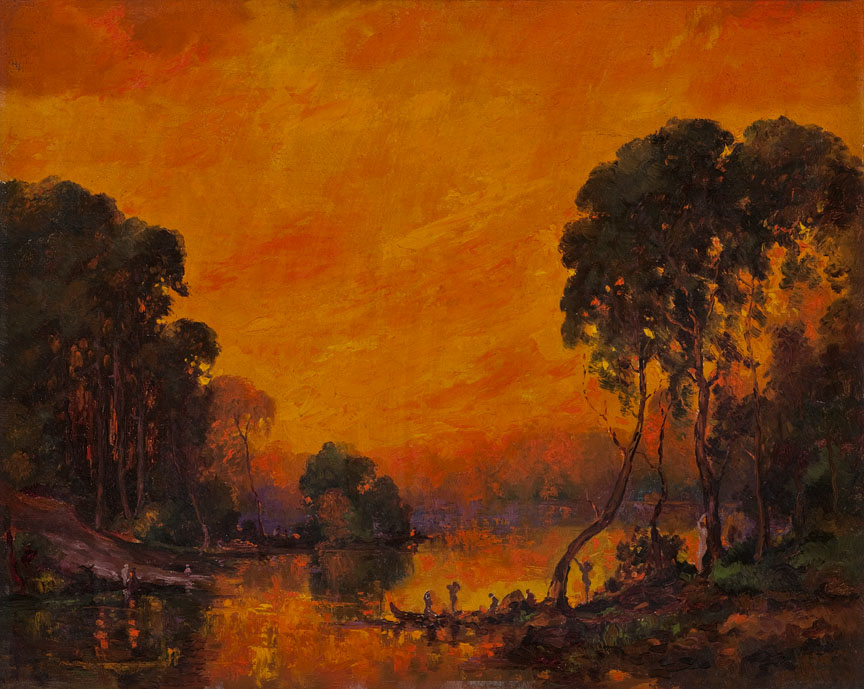
"Red Sky at Sunset," from the Key of Red series, c. 1923

Daken possessed Synesthesia in Art, a rare and instinctive co-operation of the senses in art and music; he experienced the sensation as a child and it manifest in later years. Daken most actively engaged in synesthesia during his Hollywood years when he painted to music on stage in his "key of red" palette; as a Tonalist, he sought to emulate musicality and inspire contemplation.

== Exhibitions ==
During his lifetime, Daken exhibited in Northern and Southern California, Chicago, Cincinnati, and New York. Since his death, his works have exhibited at: the Maxwell Galleries in San Francisco; the Marin County Civic Center; the Fresno Art Museum; the Fresno Metropolitan Museum of Art and Science, the Abilene Fine Arts Museum in Abilene Texas; the Cowboy Hall of Fame in Oklahoma City; the Oakland Museum of California in Oakland; the Museum of Sonoma County in Santa Rosa; the Depot Park Museum in Sonoma, and others. In 2024,an exhibition titled Tilden Daken: The Art of Adventure, was held at Museum of Sonoma County and Jack London State Historic Park.

== Museum Collections ==
Tilden Daken's art is in the following museum collections:

- Museum of Sonoma County, Santa Rosa, CA
- Oakland Museum of California, Oakland, CA
- Saint Mary's College of California, Art Museum, Moraga, CA
- Sonoma State Historic Park, Sonoma, CA
- Nevada Museum of Art, Reno, NV
- Haggin Museum, Stockton, CA
- Monterey Museum of Art, Monterey, CA
- Depot Park Museum, Sonoma, CA

== Gallery ==
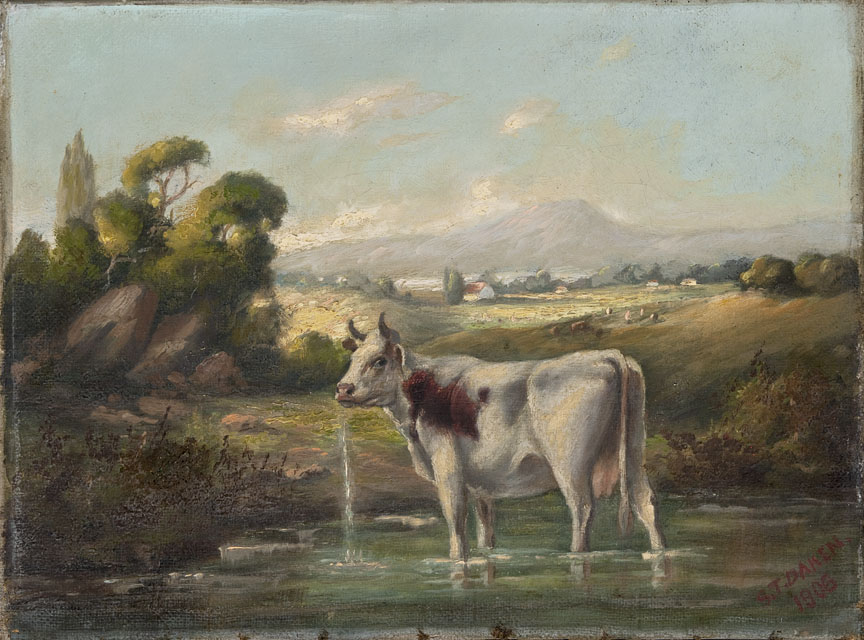
Marin County, Mount Tamalpais in Distance, 1906

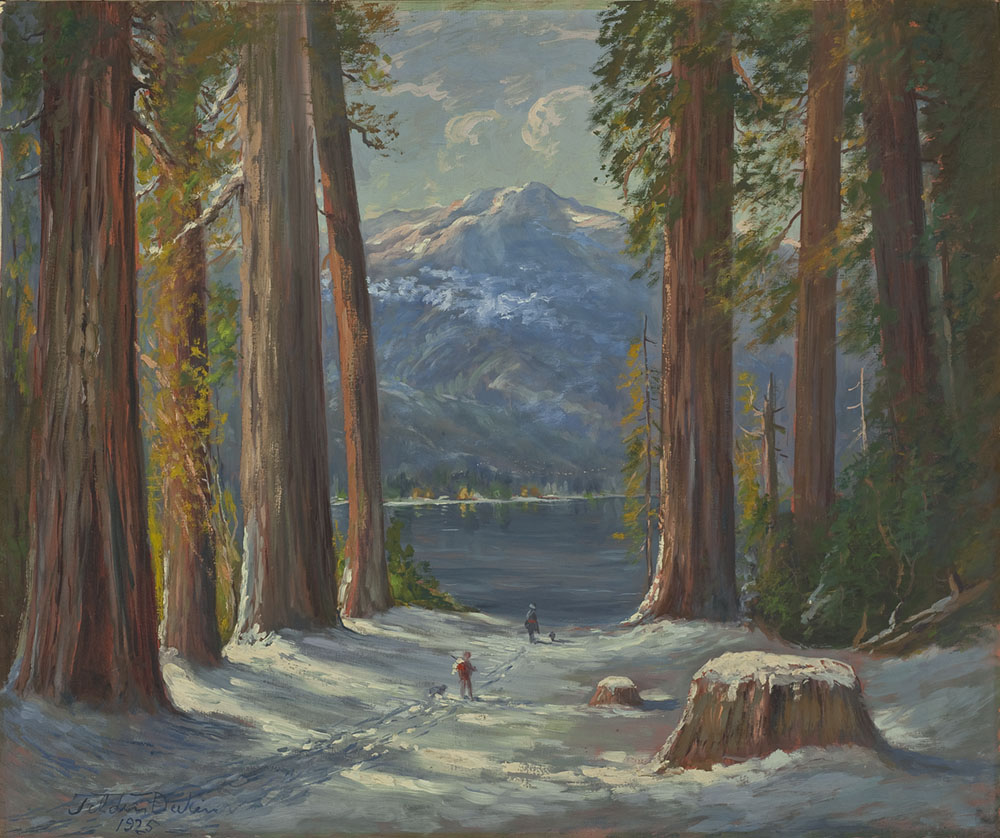
"Fallen Leaf Lake, Lake Tahoe, Fall of 1922," from the Northern California Alps collection.

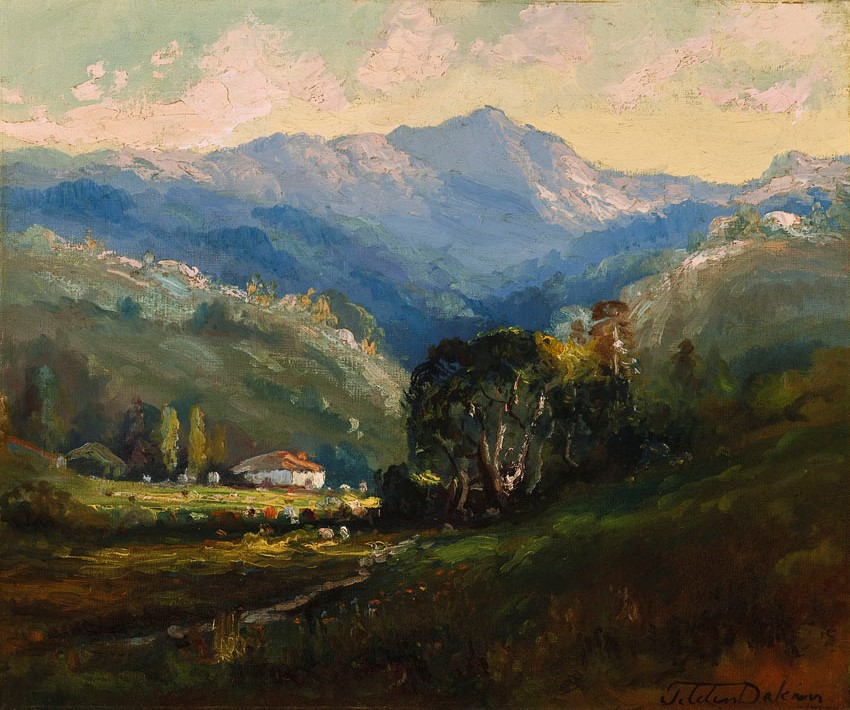
On the Trail to Big Canyon, Mount Tamalpais, Marin County, 1925

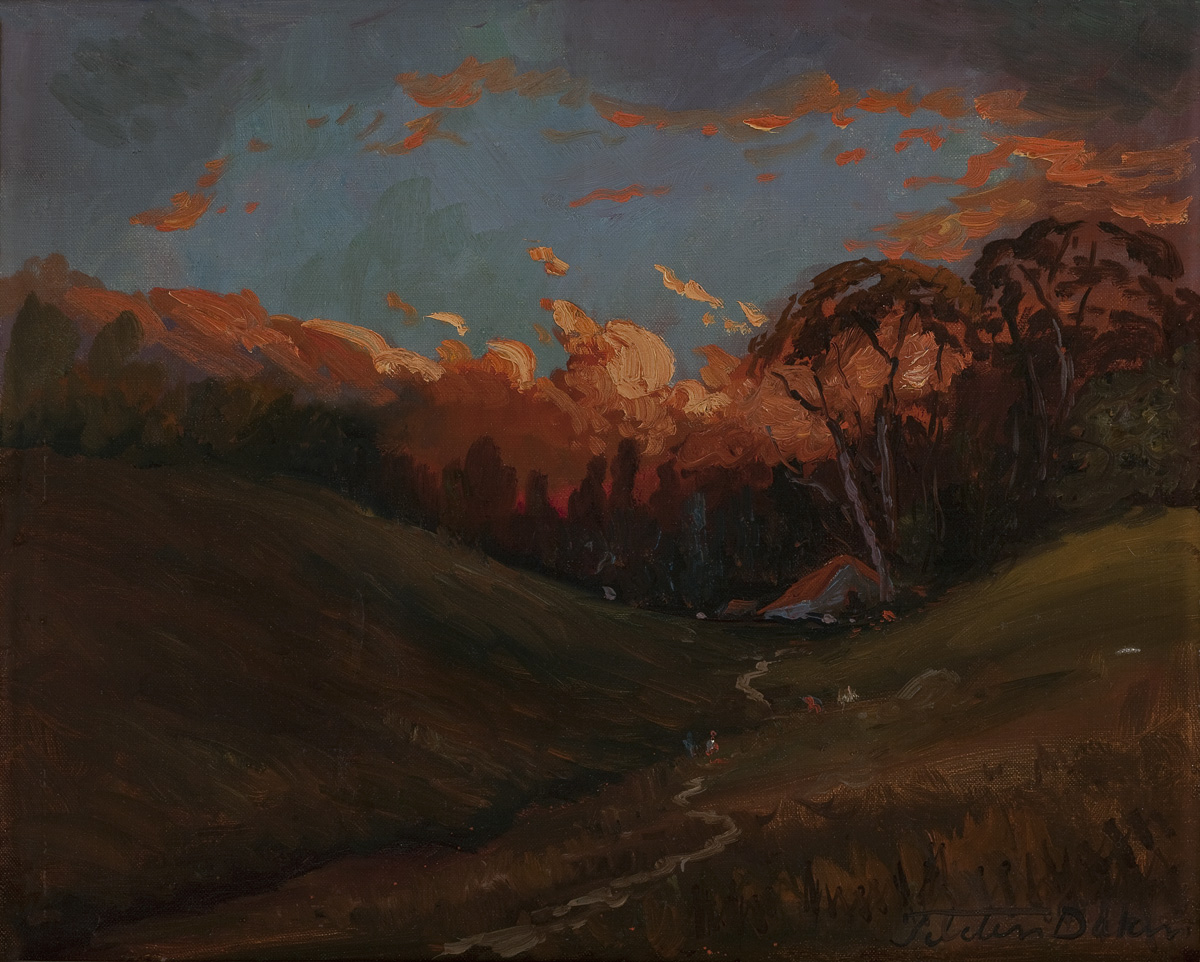
"Glorious California Sunset," c. 1923
