= Synesthesia in literature =

Fictional works that have main characters with synesthesia and non-fiction books to non-specialist audiences reflect the condition's influence in popular culture and how non-synesthetes view it. Synesthesia is a neurological condition in which one or more sensory modalities become linked. However, for over a century, synesthesia has also been the artistic and poetic devices that try to connect the senses.

Not all depictions of synesthesia in the fictional works are accurate. Some are highly inaccurate and reflect more the author's interpretation of synesthesia than they do the phenomenon itself. For example, Edgar Allan Poe physiologically incorrectly explained synesthesia via a connection between tympanum and retina. Scientific works are intended to accurately depict synesthetic experiences. However, as research advances, subsequent studies may supersede or correct some of the specific details in older accounts.

In addition to its role in art, synesthesia has often been used as a plot device or as a way of developing a particular character's internal states. Synesthetes have appeared in novels including Vladimir Nabokov's The Gift and Invitation to a Beheading.

With the increased research into synesthesia from the 1990s into the twenty-first century, more novels have appeared with synesthete-characters. Since 2001, more than 15 novels featuring synesthete-characters have been published. Author and synesthete Patricia Lynne Duffy in her presentations on "Images of Synesthetes in Fiction" has described four ways in which synesthete characters have generally been used in modern fiction: (1) synesthesia as Romantic ideal; (2) synesthesia as pathology; (3) synesthesia as Romantic pathology; (4) synesthesia as health and balance for some individuals (Duffy 2006, 2007).

== As romantic ideal ==
In Vladimir Nabokov's novel, The Gift, the main character Fyodor is a gifted young poet who experiences synesthesia. Fyodor's synesthetic experience of language is compared to that of nineteenth-century French Symbolist poet, Arthur Rimbaud (as expressed in the latter's poem, Voyelles about the perception of colored vowel sounds). Fyodor perceives a sublime beauty in letters and sounds, which he shares with others through poetic description: "If I had some paints handy, I would mix burnt sienna and sepia for you as to match the color of a 'ch' sound..and you would appreciate my radiant 's' if I could pour into your cupped hands some of those luminous sapphires that I touched as a child." In writing about synesthesia, Nabokov drew on his own synesthetic experiences, as detailed in his autobiography, Speak, Memory.

== As pathology ==
Brain injuries can induce certain types of synesthetic experience. Duffy notes that a character's synesthesia is sometimes shown as a pathological condition related to brain injury. For example, in the novel, The Whole World Over by Julia Glass, the character Saga experiences words as having color after she has an accident that causes a head trauma. In the quote, Duffy illustrates how the perceived colors are a distraction for the character: "The word would fill her mind for a few minutes with a single color: not an unpleasant sensation but still an intrusion... Patriarch: Brown, she thought, a temple of a word, a shiny red brown, like the surface of a chestnut."

== As romantic pathology ==
This category of synesthesia combines the previous two: the character's synesthesia is portrayed as pathology — but a "glorious" pathology, allowing them to perceive more sublime levels of reality. In Holly Payne's novel, The Sound of Blue, the character, Milan, a composer, perceives music as having beautiful color, but his synesthetic experience indicates an oncoming epileptic seizure: "Without color, he heard nothing. He filled notebooks with the sound of yellow and red. Purple. Green... Like Liszt and Stravinsky, Kandinsky and Rimbaud, Milan shared the multisensory perception of synesthetes, and unfortunately the seizures that about 4 per cent of them endured... Milan's epilepsy resulted from his multisensory experiences."

== As health and balance for some individuals ==
Duffy argues that in this category of novel, the ability to perceive synesthetically represents health and balance for the particular character. When such characters experience emotional trauma, they lose the ability to perceive synesthetically. After the trauma is resolved, the character regains synesthetic perception, which represents health and wholeness for that individual. Examples of such characters are found in Jane Yardley's novel, Painting Ruby Tuesday and in Wendy Mass's children's novel, A Mango-Shaped Space. In the latter novel, the 13-year-old character, Mia loses her synesthesia after her beloved cat dies, but regains it after she works through the trauma. As her therapist tells her, "Your colors will return, Mia, I promise. And you'll feel three-dimensional again."

== Synesthesia in adult fiction ==
Below is a short list of books in which one of the main characters is portrayed as experiencing synesthesia.

- Baudelaire, Charles. "Correspondances" in Les Fleurs du Mal
- Bender, Aimee (2010) "The Particular Sadness of Lemon Cake"
- Berry, M. (2005). Blind Crescent. Toronto: Penguin.
- Bester, Alfred (1956). The Stars My Destination. New York: Vintage
- Chevalier, T. (1999). Girl with a Pearl Earring. Dutton Adult.
- Faulkner, William (1929). The Sound and the Fury. Random House
- Fawer, Adam (2008). Gnosis, also published as Empathy.
- Ford, Jeffrey (2005). Nebula Awards Showcase 2005. New York: Penguin.
- Forster, E. M. (1911). "The Celestial Omnibus" in The Celestial Omnibus and Other Stories. United Kingdom: Sidgwick & Jackson.
- Halvorson, Eileen (2009). The Color of Light. Aonian Press.
- Herbert, Frank. The Dune saga. Synesthesia is experienced by the Atreides family, notably Paul and Leto II.
- Huysmans, J.-K. (1884; English translation by Robert Baldick, 1959). À rebours [Against Nature]. London: Penguin Books.
- Kernan, B. M. (2002). The Synesthete. Lincoln, NE: Writer's Showcase.
- Koontz, Dean. (1996). Intensity. New York: Bantam Dell Publishing Group
- Lupton, Rosamund. "The Quality of Silence". (2015) Little Brown. Deaf character, Ruby, posts tweets on Twitter, defining words by how they taste, look, and feel.
- Matthews, Jason (2013). Red Sparrow. The title character is a synesthete and is portrayed as having an unusual ability to read the character and intentions of others by the colors they project to her.
- Meldrum, Christina (2011). "Amaryllis in Blueberry". New York: Gallery Books
- Moore, J. (2004). The Memory Artists. Toronto: Penguin.
- Morall, C. (2004). Astonishing Splashes of Colour. Harper Collins.
- Nabokov, Vladimir (1991/1938). The Gift. New York: Vintage.
- Nabokov, Vladimir The Real Life of Sebastian Knight.
- Neal, J. M. (2007). Specific Gravity. Dunn Avenue Press.
- Neal, J. M. (2008). Ontario Lacus. Dunn Avenue Press.
- Payne, Holly (2005). The Sound of Blue. New York: Penguin Group.
- Parker, T. J. (2006). The Fallen. New York: William Morrow.
- Perdue, Lewis (2001). Daughter of God. St Martin's Press.
- Rimbaud, Arthur. "Les Voyelles".
- Rotenberg, David (2012-2014). The Junction Chronicles. Simon & Schuster. Speculative thriller trilogy in which the protagonist and many other synesthete characters display extraordinary gifts.
- Salzman, Mark Lying Awake.
- Shelley, Mary. (1818). "Frankenstein." London: Lackington, Hughes, Harding, Mavor & Jones.
- Smith, Dominic (2007). The Beautiful Miscellaneous: A Novel. New York: Atria.
- Truong, Monique (2010) "Bitter in the Mouth"
- Vaz, K. (1994). Saudade. New York: St. Martin's Press.
- Vian, Boris (2003). Foam of the Daze. Tam-Tam Books. (former translation: Mood Indigo.)
- Yardley, Jane (2003). Painting Ruby Tuesday. London: Doubleday.
- Anna Ferrara, 2018, The Woman Who Tried To Be Normal (Those Strange Women #3) - The main character Helen Mendel 'sees sounds, hears images and tastes feelings' which allows her to detect lies and sense emotions most people aren't able to detect.

== Synesthesia in teenage/children's fiction ==
- Anderson, R.J. (2011). Ultraviolet. UK: Orchard.
- Bosch, Pseudonymous (2007). The Name of This Book is Secret. New York: Little Brown and Co.
- Bowler, Tim (2002). Starseeker. UK: Oxford University Press.
- Rose, Malcom (2009) Traces series, Murder Club. UK: Kingfisher.
- Mass, W. (2003). A Mango-Shaped Space. London: Little Brown and Co.
- Montgomery, L.M. (1913). The Golden Road.
- Morgan, N. (2003). Mondays are Red. New York: Delacorte.
- Nash, Naomi (2005). Senses Working Overtime. New York: Smooch.
- Nelson, Jandy (2024). When the World Tips Over. New York: Dial Books.
- Nordstrum, Ursula (1972) The Secret Language.
- Unsworth, Tania (2015) The One Safe Place. London: Orion Publishing Co.
- Connor, Leslie (2018) The Truth as Told by Mason Buttle. New York: Katherine Tegen Books
- Sutherland, Tui (2016) “Wings of Fire Legends - Darkstalker” US: Scholastic

== Synesthesia in graphic novels and comic books ==
- Di Filippo, P., and Ordway, J. (2006). Top 10: Beyond the Farthest Precinct. La Jolla, CA: America's Best Comics.
- Moore, A., Ha, G., and Cannon, Z. (2000). Top 10: Book 1. La Jolla, CA: America's Best Comics.
- Moore, A., Ha, G. and Cannon, Z. (2002). Top 10: Book 2. La Jolla, CA: America's Best Comics.
- Pidjin, (2010), Month 2, Day 24
- Homestuck, 6/20/10

== Non-fiction general audience books ==
- Ackerman, D. (1994). chapter on "Synesthesia" in A Natural History of the Senses. New York: Vintage.
- Baron-Cohen, S. and Harrison, J. (1997). Synaesthesia: Classic and Contemporary Readings. Oxford: Blackwell Publishers. ISBN 0-631-19764-8.
- Cytowic, R. (2003). The Man Who Tasted Shapes. New York: Tarcher/Putman. ISBN 0-262-53255-7.
- Dann, K. (1998). Bright Colors Falsely Seen. Cambridge: Harvard University Press. ISBN 0-300-06619-8.
- Duffy, P. L. (2001). Blue Cats and Chartreuse Kittens: How Synesthetes Color their Worlds. New York: Henry Holt & Company. ISBN 0-7167-4088-5.
- Harrison, J. (2001). Synaesthesia: the strangest thing, Oxford: Oxford University Press. ISBN 0-19-263245-0.
- Luria, A.R. (1968). The Mind of a Mnemonist. New York: Basic Books.
- Lvovich, N. (1997). Chapter 2, "Confessions of a Synesthete" in The Multilingual Self. Mahwah, New Jersey: Lawrence Erlbaum Associates.
- Ramachandran, V.S. (2004). A Brief Tour of Human Consciousness: From Impostor Poodles to Purple Numbers. Pi Press. ISBN 0-13-148686-1
- Sacks, O. (1995). "The Case of the Colorblind Painter" in An Anthropologist on Mars. New York: Vintage.
- Tammet, Daniel. "Born on a Blue Day" London: Hodder and Stoughton.
