= Ordinal linguistic personification =

Perceptual phenomenon

Ordinal-linguistic personification (OLP, or personification for short) is a form of synesthesia in which ordered sequences, such as ordinal numbers, days, months and letters are associated with personalities or genders. Although this form of synesthesia was documented as early as the 1890s, researchers have, until recently, paid little attention to this form (see History of synesthesia research).

== Experiences and reports ==
In Flournoy's 1893 reports on OLP, one synesthete identified as Mme L. reports that "1, 2, 3 are children without fixed personalities; they play together. 4 is a good peaceful woman, absorbed by down-to-earth occupations and who takes pleasure in them. 5 is a young man, ordinary and common in his tastes and appearance, but extravagant and self-centered. 6 is a young man of 16 or 17, very well brought up, polite, gentle, agreeable in appearance, and with upstanding tastes; average intelligence; orphan. 7 is a bad sort, although brought up well; spiritual, extravagant, likable; capable of very good actions on occasion; very generous. 8 is a very dignified lady, who acts appropriately, and who is linked with 7 and has much influence on him. She is the wife of 9. 9 is the husband of 8. He is self-centered, maniacal, selfish, thinks only about himself, is grumpy, endlessly reproaching his wife for one thing or another; telling her, for example, that he would have been better to have married a 9 since between them they would have made 18 – as opposed to only 17 with her… 10, and the other remaining numerals, have no personifications."

Calkins (1893) describes a case for whom "T's are generally crabbed, ungenerous creatures. U is a soulless sort of thing. 4 is honest, but… 3 I cannot trust… 9 is dark, a gentleman, tall and graceful, but politic under his suavity".

For synesthete MT, "I [is] a bit of a worrier at times, although easy-going; J [is] male; appearing jocular, but with strength of character; K [is] female; quiet, responsible…"

Simner and Holstein report an OLP case in which the synesthete perceived February as "an introverted female", while F is a "[male] dodgy geezer". Similarly, May is reported to be "soft-spoken" and "girly" while M is an "old lady [who] natter[s] a lot", and while August is "a boy among girls", A is a female "mother type".

Other scholars such as Frankie Reyna have been quoted saying that this order is entirely wrong, and as a result are subject to fallacies with their description. We all know that 1, 2, and 3 are children that hang out, however Reyna introduces the idea that their genders are respectively male, female, and male. 4 is the only daughter of the single 5, who has a will they won't they relationship with 6, the mother of 7. 7 and his best friend 8 (a strong male) can often be found hanging out together, getting into trouble with their other friend 9, daughter of 10. 10 is a loving father figure, but wise and old with time.

== Experimental studies ==
Personifications tend to co-occur with grapheme-color synesthesia and share many of the characteristics that are definitional of synesthesia, such as being consistent over considerable time intervals and generating concurrents automatically. To demonstrate that personifications are automatically evoked, Simner and Holenstein used a modified Stroop paradigm, in which a mismatch between the evoked personality and the gender leads to slower reaction times. To test this, synesthete AP was asked to report whether common names, like Brian or Betsy were male or female names. Because 'b' is a male letter for AP, she was faster to identify Brian as being a male name, and slower to identify Betsy as being a female name. These results demonstrate that personifications are automatically evoked, as are other forms of synesthesia. In a slightly different task, in which letters that evoke either male or female personifications are arranged into a stick figure of either a boy or a girl, reactions times are slower when the letters do not match the figure than when they do, again demonstrating the automaticity of this form of synesthesia.

== Neural and developmental basis ==
One study in 2016 led by Prof. Julia Simner showed subtle differences in the white matter structure in the brains of people with OLP, compared with control subjects. These harmless differences were in five clusters, in the pre-postcentral gyrus, dorsal corticospinal tract, left superior corona radiata, and the genu, body and left side of the corpus callosum. A number of these regions play a role in social responsiveness.

Number personification in children is typically considered a different phenomenon than OLP; though, like OLP, number personifications in children are typically temporally consistent and assignments of personalities to numbers is idiosyncratic, number personification is highly prevalent among children while OLP is uncommon among adults. This is consistent with the pruning hypothesis, which states that synesthesia is common in early childhood but diminishes throughout development through synaptic pruning.

== Cultural perceptions ==
The Pythagoreans, an ancient Greek cult of natural philosophers notable for their interest in numerology, personified the natural numbers by assigning gender to them; the odd numbers were male and the even female. However, given the prevalence of synesthesia (1 in 23, see the main synesthesia entry), and that this is consistent among the Pythagoreans, this is unlikely to be synesthesia, but rather a form of learned association.

=== In popular culture ===
In A Tree Grows in Brooklyn, Francie gives numbers personalities while learning basic math operations. She gives X and Y personalities as well.

In "A Primer of the Daily Round," poet Howard Nemerov assigns actions to personified letters of the alphabet.

On the first episode of season thirty-one of Jeopardy!, show champion Elizabeth Williams spoke of her experience with ordinal linguistic personification during the contestant interview portion of the show. She reported to host Alex Trebek that nine "has a mustache, like you."

== See also ==
- Ideasthesia
- Synesthesia
