= Califano =

Califano is an Italian surname. Notable people with the surname include:

- Arcangelo Califano (fl. 1730s-1750s), Italian composer and musician
- Andrea Califano Italian-bron American systems biologist
- Aniello Califano (1870–1919), Italian poet and writer
- Christian Califano (born 1972), French rugby player
- Dan Califano (fl. 1973), Argentine or American soccer player
- Franco Califano (1938–2013), Italian musician
- John Edmund Califano (1862–1946), American artist
- Joseph A. Califano Jr. (born 1931), American jurist, government administrator, and writer
