= Neural basis of synesthesia =

Synesthesia is a neurological condition in which two or more bodily senses are coupled. For example, in a form of synesthesia known as Grapheme → color synesthesia, letters or numbers may be perceived as inherently colored. In another, called number → form synesthesia, numbers are automatically and consistently associated with locations in space. In yet another form of synesthesia, called ordinal linguistic personification, either numbers, days of the week, or months of the year evoke personalities. In other forms of synesthesia, music and other sounds may be perceived as colored or having particular shapes. Recent research has begun to explore the neural basis of these experiences, drawing both on neuroscientific principles and on functional neuroimaging data.

Based on these data, two major theories have been proposed concerning the neural basis of synesthesia. Both theories start from the observation that there are dedicated regions of the brain that are specialized for certain functions. For example, the part of the human brain involved in processing visual input, called the visual cortex can be further subdivided into regions that are preferentially involved in color-processing (the fourth visual area, V4) or with motion processing, called V5 or MT. Based on this notion of specialized regions, some researchers have suggested that increased cross-talk between different regions specialized for different functions may account for different types of synesthesia.

== Cross-activation ==
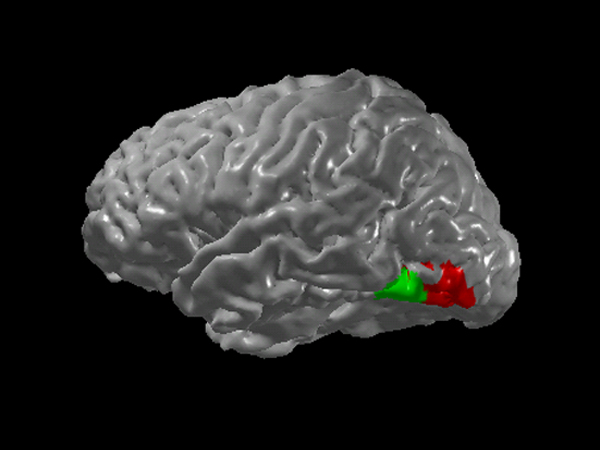
Regions proposed to be cross-activated in grapheme-color synesthesia (from Ramachandran & Hubbard 2001).

Since regions involved in the identification of letters and numbers lie adjacent to a region involved in color-processing (V4), the additional experience of seeing colors when looking at graphemes might be due to "cross-activation" of V4 (Ramachandran & Hubbard 2001). This cross-activation may arise due to a failure of the normal developmental process of pruning, which is one of the key mechanisms of synaptic plasticity, in which connections between brain regions are partially eliminated with development. Similarly, lexical → gustatory synesthesia may be due to increased connectivity between adjacent regions of the insula in the depths of the lateral sulcus involved in taste processing that lie adjacent to temporal lobe regions involved in auditory processing. Similarly, taste → touch synesthesia may arise from connections between gustatory regions and regions of the somatosensory system involved in processing touch. However, not all forms of synesthesia are easily explained by adjacency.

== Disinhibited feedback ==
Alternatively, synesthesia may arise through "disinhibited feedback" or a reduction in the amount of inhibition along feedback pathways (Grossenbacher & Lovelace 2001). It is well established that information not only travels from the primary sensory areas to association areas such as the parietal lobe or the limbic system, but also travels back in the opposite direction, from "higher order" cortical regions to early sensory areas. Normally, the balance of excitation and inhibition are maintained. However, if this feedback were not adequately inhibited, then signals coming from later stages of processing might influence earlier stages of processing, such that tones would activate visual cortical areas in synesthetes more than in non-synesthetes. In this case, it might be possible to temporarily have synesthetic experiences after taking drugs like LSD or mescaline. Indeed, some psychedelic drug users report synesthesia-like experiences, although the exact degree of similarity between these drug induced experiences and congenital synesthesia is still unclear (Luke & Terhune 2013).

== Semantics ==
Much evidence indicates that synesthesia is essentially a semantic phenomenon. This suggests a very different theoretical approach to synesthesia, known as ideasthesia. According to this account, synesthesia is a phenomenon mediated by the extraction of the meaning of the inducer. Therefore, the neural mechanisms of synesthesia must rely on the mechanisms of semantics, which are currently poorly understood. In turn, semantics is closely related to the problem of understanding, which Searle illustrates the importance of understanding through the Chinese room argument. Thus, the question of the neural basis of synesthesia may be ultimately related to the neural mechanisms of understanding.

Semantic associations are how people assign meaning to concepts and play a significant role in certain types of synesthesia, particularly in linguistic-based forms like grapheme-color synesthesia. In these cases, specific letters or words evoke colors, suggesting that semantic processing may link otherwise separate sensory experiences. Research has shown that this phenomenon may be due to abnormal structural or functional connections in the brain, particularly in regions involved in sensory processing and in areas associated with meaning, such as the left fusiform gyrus. Theories suggest that cross-activation or disinhibition of feedback between adjacent regions (such as those that process color and those involved in letter recognition) contributes to these experiences. Studies using fMRI and DTI (diffusion tensor imaging) have found increased connectivity between areas associated with the stimulus (e.g., the visual word form area for letters and words) and the sensory experience they evoke (e.g., color processing regions in the visual cortex).

== Neurophysiological substrates ==
Given that synesthesia is known to run in families, it has been suggested that a genetic difference, or single-nucleotide polymorphisms (SNPs, pronounced "SNiPs") might be responsible for either decreased pruning or decreased inhibition in the synesthete brain, leading to increased activation. These theories are not mutually exclusive. It may be that both mechanisms are possible causes of synesthesia, but that one or the other is present in differing degrees between different syntesthetes, or for different types of synesthesia. Researchers have used twin studies to investigate the genetic basis of synesthesia. Studies have found that synesthesia is more common in monozygotic twins who share 100% of their genetic material, in dizygotic twins who share only 50%. Other studies have shown that synesthesia can run in families, with a higher incidence of synesthetic traits in the relatives of syntesthetes, especially in those who are genetically related. However, environmental factors, including early childhood experiences, may also play a role. If a child is adopted, the synesthesia could stem from either their biological family's genetic predisposition or from their adoptive family environment.

== Etiology of Synesthesia ==
While developmental synesthesia likely has a genetic origin, there are also ways to develop synesthesia. Acquired synesthesia is a form of synesthesia that can materialize later on in life, usually following a brain injury or the loss of sensory input to the central nervous system from afferent nerves, which is called sensory deafferentation. Pharmacological synesthesia is another form of synesthesia that is temporary and can develop after the intake of hallucinogenic drugs.

== Functional neuroimaging studies ==
Functional neuroimaging studies using positron emission tomography (PET) and functional magnetic resonance imaging (fMRI) have demonstrated significant differences between the brains of synesthetes and non-synesthetes (although some studies failed to find such differences). The first such study used PET to demonstrate that some regions of the visual cortex (but not V4) were more active when auditory word → color synesthetes listened to words compared to tones (Paulesu et al. 1995). More recent studies using fMRI have demonstrated that V4 is more active in both word → color and grapheme → color synesthetes (Nunn et al. 2002; Hubbard et al. 2005a; Sperling et al. 2006). However, these neuroimaging studies do not have the spatial and temporal resolution to distinguish between the pruning and disinhibited feedback theories. Future research will continue to examine these questions using not only fMRI but also diffusion tensor imaging (DTI), which allows researchers to directly investigate neural connectivity in the human brain and magnetic resonance spectroscopy (MRS) which allows researchers to measure the amounts of different neurotransmitters in the brain.

== Common Experiences ==
Synesthesia is reported to be prevalent in 2-4% of the population, however this number is assumed to be much greater. The exact number of cases dealing with synesthesia is difficult to calculate because many people may not even be aware they have it, or what synesthesia really is. Synesthesia is also linked to have higher rates within the ASD (autism spectrum disorder) community. 18.9% of autistic individuals reported experiencing symptoms related to synesthesia (Wu, 2023). Additionally, as previously mentioned, there are numerous different types of synesthesia conditions that an individual could experience. This could lead to further confusion of what the neurological condition really is, and how it is linked to sensory crossovers.

The most common type of synesthesia is grapheme-color synesthesia, which occurs when an individual associates colors with letter, numbers, or shapes. For example, an individual with grapheme color synesthesia may consistently perceive the letter "E" as purple, and the number "6" as yellow.

== See also ==
- Ideasthesia
