= Carol Steen =

American artist and writer

- Born: 1943 (age 82–83)
- Education: M.F.A., Cranbrook Academy of Art, Bloomfield Hills, Michigan, 1971; B.A., Michigan State University, East Lansing, Michigan, 1965
- Occupations: Artist; Writer; Curator; Professor of Art

Carol Steen is an artist, writer and curator who lives and works in New York. She has had over 20 solo gallery exhibitions, her first solo exhibition in 1973 was at the Detroit Institute of Arts, and her work has been in over 50 group exhibitions including shows at the Philadelphia Museum of Art, the Brookgreen Gardens Museum in South Carolina, the Cranbrook Museum in Michigan, and the DeCordova Museum in Massachusetts. Steen's work has also been exhibited at the Theatre for a New Audience in Brooklyn, NY, the Museum of Modern Art of Ukraine, and Wayne State University, Detroit, Michigan.

Steen has been the recipient of fellowships from the MacDowell Colony in Peterborough, New Hampshire; the Printmaking Workshop in New York City; and the New York Foundation for the Arts (NYFA); among others. Her work is in the collections of several public art collections including the Detroit Institute of Arts, the Robert McGlaughlin Gallery in Canada, and the Library of Congress.

== Experience of synesthesia ==
She is notable for her artworks which make use of her experiences of synesthesia and for her work in making the knowledge of synesthesia available to people, particularly through the American Synesthesia Association. Steen experiences colors while viewing letters and numbers (grapheme-color synesthesia), music (timbre-color synesthesia), and touch-color synesthesia in response to acupuncture and pain. She has shared her synesthetic experiences on the first website about synesthesia created by Karen Chenausky, Adam Rosen and her in 1996 at the Massachusetts Institute of Technology.

She studied art at Cranbrook Academy of Art where she gained her Master of Fine Arts. She has taught at the University of Michigan and at William Paterson University. Steen currently teaches at Touro College, New York.

An example of Carol's digital artwork, displayed during a production of Valley of Astonishment in 2014

Along with Greta Berman and Daphne Maurer, she contributed to and edited Synesthesia: Art and the Mind (2008), which documents an exhibition of artists who were known or thought to be synesthetic. This exhibition was held at the McMaster Museum of Art. It was co-curated by her and Greta Berman and ran from September 2008 through December 2008.

Steen has presented her work at numerous conferences on synesthesia including; the University of Edinburgh, 2008; University of Granada, 2007; University of California Berkeley, 2004; University of California San Diego, 2002; Yale 1999; and the University of Cambridge, Trinity College, 1997; among many others. She has been a co-chair and panelist for talks on Synesthesia and Art at the College Art Association’s annual conferences in 2005 and 2009. She has presented her work at the School of Visual Arts in NYC in 2007, at The Juilliard School every year since 2000, and at M.I.T. in 1997.

She has been in numerous television and radio documentaries including “60 Minutes”, the BBC, and NPR, and in many books, magazines and newspapers including, the Smithsonian Magazine, Newsweek, The New York Times, and the Wall Street Journal.

In addition, Steen is the co-founder, with Patricia Lynne Duffy, and current board member of the American Synesthesia Association.

The character of the synesthetic painter in Peter Brook and Marie-Hélène Estienne's play The Valley of Astonishment, 2014, was based on part of Steen's life.

== Selected Listing of Public Appearances ==
Date of Appearance	Event Description
June 2014	Young Vic Theatre, London, UK
March 2014	Keynote Speaker South Carolina Federation of Museums, Camden, SC
April 2012	Sussex Conversations, April 26, London, UK http://www.sussex.ac.uk/fiftyyears/sussexconversations/mindandbrain University of Sussex, Brighton, UK
April 2012	The Juilliard School/ Weill Cornell Medical Center, NYC, Music and Medicine Initiative
August 2011	IV Encuentro Internacional Arte Y Nuevas Ciencias 2011, Mexico City, Mexico (Invited presenter, in residence for one week.)
November 2010	New York University, The Phenomenology of Synesthesia
November 2010	The Juilliard School, NYC, Lecture to faculty
April 2010	Center for Consciousness Studies, University of Arizona, Tucson, AZ
February 2009	College Art Association Conference, presented paper, Synesthesia: Art and the Mind, Los Angeles, CA
December 2006	Artists Talk on Art, Panel Organizer, Presented: Synesthesia and Perception, School of Visual Arts, NYC
February 2005	College Art Association 2005 Annual Conference, Atlanta, Georgia, Session Co-Chair of Synesthesia and Perception. Presented paper: Internal Landscape
October 2001	Hirshhorn Museum, Washington D.C.

== Bibliography ==
- Steen, Carol; Berman, Greta (December 2013). Synesthesia and the Artistic Process. Oxford University Press. ISBN 978-0-19-960332-9.
- Berman, Greta; Steen, Carol; Maurer, Daphne (October 25, 2008). Synesthesia: Art and the Mind. McMaster Museum of Art / ABC Art Books Canada. ISBN 978-0-9783585-8-7.
- Steen, Carol (2001). "Visions Shared: A Firsthand Look Into Synesthesia and Art". Leonardo. 34 (3): 203–208. doi:10.1162/002409401750286949. S2CID 57570552.
- Von Klängen und Schmerzen: Nützliche Farbe, (Chapter 6 in Part II) Pages: 227234 in “Synästhesien – roter Faden durchs Leben?”, Edited by Alexandra Dittmar, Publisher: Die Blaue Eule, Essen (Germany), October 2007, English edition, January 2009.
- Synesthesia, Carol Steen and Lawrence E. Marks, World Book Encyclopedia, Nicholas V. Kilzer, editor, 2013.
- Synesthesia: Seeing the World Differently, Volume 11 – Automne 2012. Neurosciences, arts et literature https://web.archive.org/web/20150812213227/http://epistemocritique.org/spip.php?rubrique68
- Synesthesia and Creativity: Does seeing the world differently lead to creative insights? Sussex Conversations, The Royal Institution, April 26, 2012, London, UK http://www.sussex.ac.uk/fiftyyears/sussexconversations/mindandbrain
