= American Synesthesia Association =

Not-for-profit academic society

The American Synesthesia Association (ASA) is a not-for-profit academic and public society whose mission is to foster and promote the education and the advancement of knowledge of the phenomena of synesthesia, a neurological condition in which stimulation in one sensory modality leads to experiences in a second, unstimulated modality. The ASA attempts to promote and provide a means for the people who experience and/or study synesthesia to be in contact with each other. As part of its educational mission, the ASA provides information to scientists, health professionals, academicians, researchers, artists, writers, musicians, lay persons and people who experience synesthesia.

== Membership ==
The society currently includes about 200 members. Membership is open to anyone interested in the study of synesthesia, who experiences synesthesia, or who uses synesthesia in their art or published works. As public awareness of synesthesia has grown, the number of members has increased.

== History ==
The American Synesthesia Association was created in 1995 by Carol Steen and Patricia Lynne Duffy after discovering, through correspondence with Simon Baron-Cohen, that there were other people in the New York metropolitan area who experienced synesthesia. The ASA was born out of a desire to meet other synesthetes, and to improve communication between synesthetes and researchers.

In 2000, the ASA was incorporated and received provisional status, 501(c)(3) in 2001. In 2005, the ASA received permanent 501(c)(3) status, and is now a Public Charity under the IRS tax code.

The Board Members of the ASA are Sean A. Day, Peter Grossenbacher, emeritus, Lawrence E. Marks, Daphne Maurer, and Carol Steen.

== Meetings ==
As of 2013, the ASA has held ten major conferences, with attendees from around the world, but mostly from the United States and Europe. The first meeting of the ASA was held at Princeton University in 2001 with the attendance of numerous synesthesia researchers including Larry Marks, Vilayanur S. Ramachandran, Peter Grossenbacher, and artists and authors including Patricia Lynne Duffy and Natasha Lvovich. This meeting was featured in the popular press, including Time magazine and other media outlets. The first conference also became the subject of a documentary video. Since 2002, the ASA has instituted a keynote speaker, who gives an hour long lecture linking synesthesia with other domains of research. In 2011, the University of California, San Diego became the first location to host the ASA annual meeting twice (2002, 2011).

Summary of American Synesthesia Association Meetings
Meeting	Location	Dates	Presentations	Keynote Speaker
1st	Princeton University	May 19, 2001	10	None
2nd	University of California, San Diego	May 17–19, 2002	15	Richard Cytowic
3rd	Rockefeller University	May 2–4, 2003	18	Lawrence Marks and Mriganka Sur
4th	University of California, Berkeley	November 5–7, 2004	20	Daphne Maurer
5th	UT Health Science Center	October 28–30, 2005	17	Lynn C. Robertson
6th	University of South Florida St. Petersburg	January 26–28, 2007	21	Mike Dixon
7th	McMaster University	September 26 – 28, 2008	27	Jamie Ward
8th	Vanderbilt University	October 1–3, 2010	18	Julia Simner
9th	University of California, San Diego	October 14 – 16, 2011	20	Edward Hubbard
10th	OCAD University	May 31 - June 2, 2013	23	Noam Sagiv

== See also ==
- History of synesthesia research
- UK Synaesthesia Association
