= Cretien van Campen =

Dutch psychologist

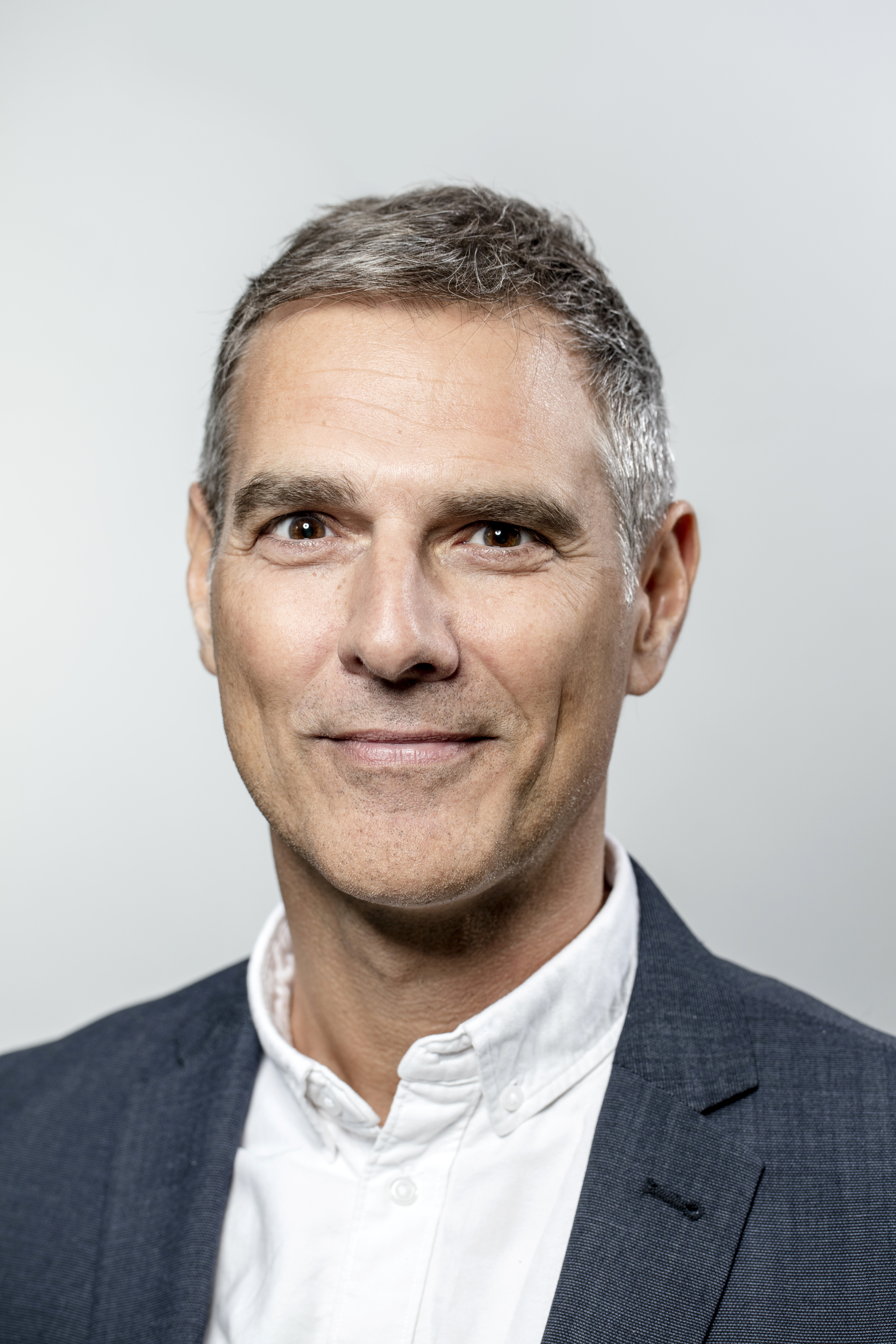
- Born: 24 January 1963; Oudenbosch, The Netherlands
- Scientific career
- Fields: health & happiness; perception & synesthesia; senses & memory
- Workplaces: Netherlands Institute for Social Research/ SCP

Cretien van Campen (born 24 January 1963) is a Dutch author, editor and scientific researcher in social science and fine arts. He is the founder of Synesthetics Netherlands and is affiliated with the Netherlands Institute for Social Research | SCP. He is best known for his work on synesthesia and studies of quality of life.

== Author ==
He is the author of the books “The Proust Effect” (2014), “The Hidden Sense” (2007), “Tussen zinnen” (Between Senses) (2005), “Beeldillusies” (Pictorial Illusions) (1994), and “Gestalt van Goethe tot Gibson” (Gestalt from Goethe thru Gibson) (1994). In the last two books he explored the crossroads of artistic and scientific experiments with visual perception. From the mid-nineties he focussed on multisensory perception and synesthesia in art and science, resulting in the bestselling Tussen zinnen in the Netherlands and the internationally acclaimed The Hidden Sense.

== Editor ==
Van Campen was editor of the Leonardo online bibliography Synesthesia in Art and Science and founder and web editor of Synesthetics Netherlands, a non-profit organization, hosting e.g. the Netherlands web community of synesthesia. He started editing during his studies as an editor of Psychopolis, an academic magazine of theoretical psychology. After graduation, he compiled a series of bibliographies on health care for the Netherlands Institute of Primary Care (NIVEL). From 1994-2000 he was editor and later editor-in-chief of the scientific journal Psychology & Maatschappij (Psychology & Society), an interdisciplinary social scientific journal that was based in the critical psychology movement.

== Scientific researcher ==
He has been affiliated with the Netherlands Institute for Social Research/SCP as Chief Scientific Strategist, the Windesheim University of Applied Sciences as an associate lector (2012 - 2017), and with Synesthetics Netherlands as an independent researcher and consultant. He obtained a M.A. in psychology with minors in philosophy and cultural studies, and a Ph.D. in history of art (and psychology) at Utrecht University, the Netherlands. During the past two decades he has been involved in two lines of research: perception and quality of life.

== Fields of interest ==
=== Perception ===
In his Ph.D. study that resulted in the book Gestalt from Goethe to Gibson (1994), van Campen linked history of art to history of science. He showed that the apparent rise of Gestalt psychology in perception research in the 1910s had its roots in late 19th century art history in Germany. The study was done in the context of the interdisciplinary Working Group Iconic Processes, including art historians, psychologists, physicists and anthropologists from several Dutch universities. For a wider audience he wrote the book Pictorial Illusions (1994), exploring the links between artistic and scientific experiments with visual perception since the Renaissance. The book received attention from national television and art and science festivals. After finishing his thesis, his interests moved to the perception of music. Soon after, he found the intriguing phenomenon of synesthesia on the crossroads of music and visual art. With artist and color expert Clara Froger, he started a series of experiments of synesthesia, combining scientific and artistic methods of investigation. The results were published nationally and internationally. The experiments became popular and got attention from hundreds of synesthetes in the Netherlands, mediated by articles and items in the Dutch media, which resulted in the Netherlands Web Community of Synesthesia and a number of workshops and conferences on synesthesia in art and science. The demand for information on synesthesia resulted in the book Tussen zinnen. The new perspective on synesthesia, developed in this book in collaboration with synesthetes, artists and scientists in the Netherlands, led to the publication of The Hidden Sense: Synesthesia in Art and Science by the MIT Press. Since then, van Campen has been consulted on synesthesia and the senses in a number of national and international projects, among them Art Education Belgium (RASA), Unilever UK and Rabobank Netherlands. His research into synesthesia has taken the direction of autobiographical memory. In his latest book The Proust Effect, he explores tales and studies on sense memories (e.g. the Madeleine story by Marcel Proust).

=== Quality of life ===
In his work as an editor of bibliographies in health care, van Campen became acquainted with the research subject of quality of life, focussing on health and happiness. Since the early nineties, he participated in series of studies on quality of health care services from the patient’s perspective at the Netherlands Institute of Primary Health Care (NIVEL) and Maastricht University. Later he participated in a number of studies into quality of care and quality of life in nursing homes, e.g. a collaborative study of the NIVEL institute and the Free University Amsterdam.

In 1998, he moved to the Netherlands Institute of Social Research (SCP), the national institute on well-being, where he broadened the scope from health and health care to citizen’s participation in work, leisure time activities and social activities. At SCP he published a series of research reports on the quality of life and participation of frail elderly and persons with physical disabilities. Currently, van Campen pursues a research program into the competences of persons with disabilities in the research field of positive psychology. Internationally, van Campen gave lectures on comparisons of quality of life in the Netherlands, Japan and South Korea. His article with SCP-colleague Jurjen Ledema, Are persons with physical disabilities who participate in society healthier and happier? was nominated as outstanding scientific article of the year by the International Society for Quality of Life Research.

Since 2007 he is principal investigator of the research programme on elderly policy and well-being at the Netherlands Institute for Social Research |SCP. Currently he has a position as Chief Scientific Strategist Quality of Life at SCP. His publications include Values on a Grey Scale: Elderly Policy Monitor 2008., Frail Older Persons in the Netherlands.,, Steering on happiness., Ageing in Care (2013), and Happy in a Nursing Home? (2017).

== Selected bibliography ==
=== In English ===
- Campen, Cretien van (2014). The Proust Effect. The Senses as Doorways to Lost Memories. Oxford: OUP.
- Campen, Cretien van (2007). The Hidden Sense. Synesthesia in Art and Science. Cambridge: MIT Press.
- Campen, C. van (2007). The importance of being healthy: Changing views on the ‘good life’ in The Netherlands since 1945. In: J. Stam & R. Veenhoven (Eds.) Quality of Life and Happiness of People in Japan and the Netherlands. Amsterdam: KIT Publishers (pp. 62–71).
- Campen, C. van & Iedema, J. (2007). Are persons with physical disabilities who participate in society healthier and happier? Structural equation modelling of objective participation and subjective well-being. Quality of Life Research vol. 16, nr. 4, pp. 635–645.
- Campen, C. van & van Gameren, E. (2005). ‘Eligibility for Long-term Care in the Netherlands: Development of a Decision Support System.’ In: Health and Social Care in the Community vol. 13, nr. 4, pp. 287–296.

=== In Dutch ===
- Campen, C. & D. Verbeek-Oudijk (2017). Gelukkig in een verpleeghuis? Den Haag: Sociaal en Cultureel Planbureau.
- Campen, C. van, M. Broese van Groenou, D. Deeg en J. Iedema (2017). Langer zelfstandig. Ouder worden met hulpbronnen, ondersteuning en zorg. Den Haag: Sociaal en Cultureel Planbureau.
- Campen, Cretien van (red.)(2011). Kwetsbare ouderen. Den Haag: SCP.
- Campen, Cretien van (2010). Gekleurd verleden. Verhalen over het geheugen van de zintuigen. Utrecht: Uitgeverij Zien.
- Campen, Cretien van (2005). Tussen zinnen. Synesthesie of hoe de zintuigen samenwerken. Utrecht: Uitgeverij Zien.
- Campen, Cretien van (1994). Beeldillusies: gezichtsbedrog in afbeeldingen sinds de renaissance. De Bilt: Cantecleer.
- Essays over geluk:
  - Campen, C. van (2008). 1948, toen was geluk heel gewoon. In: Vroeger was het beter. SCP-nieuwjaarsuitgave 2008. Den Haag: SCP (pp. 130–134).
  - Campen, C. van (2007). Bruto nationaal geluk: een proef op de som. In: Veel geluk in 2007, SCP-nieuwjaarsuitgave 2007. Den Haag: SCP, pp. 19–23.
  - Campen, C. van (2006). ‘Wat is welzijn tegenwoordig nog?’ In:? Altijd een antwoord. SCP-nieuwjaarsuitgave 2006. Den Haag: SCP.
  - Campen, C. van (2005). ‘Een gelukkige geest in een cosmetisch lichaam.’ In: Hier en daar opklaringen. SCP-Nieuwjaarsuitgave 2005. Den Haag: SCP, pp. 42–45.
