= Sarah Kraning =

American visual artist (born 1992/1993)

- Born: Sarah Kraning; 1992 or 1993 (age 33–34); Minnesota, United States
- Known for: Painting
- Website: sarahkraning.com

Sarah Kraning (born 1992/1993) is an American visual artist known for translating sound into abstract paintings through her experience of synesthesia.

She has been recognized for merging music and art in large-scale works and live performances, and her collaborations span musicians, festivals, and conservation projects. Her paintings and process have been compared to Wassily Kandinsky by The Guggenheim.

== Early life ==
Kraning was born in Minnesota and has described experiencing synesthesia from an early age, perceiving sound as color, texture, and movement. Taking inspiration from these experiences, she quickly developed an interest in capturing her experiences through abstract art. Kraning acted in youth theatre at Phipps Center for the Arts and regularly wrote original plays as a child. This passion for writing would later lead to her becoming a published playwright.

== Career ==
Kraning's professional art career began during the COVID-19 pandemic in 2021 when she first started sharing her artworks across popular social media network, TikTok, quickly gaining the attention of millions of users. Informed by her synesthetic perception, particularly sound-to-color and auditory–tactile modalities, Kraning's most notable paintings are representations of music. Her catalog of works have included musicians such as Taylor Swift, Billie Eilish, Chappell Roan and The Beatles, among others.

Kraning is now noted for her live painting performances and collaborations with musicians, including Rüfüs Du Sol, Perry Farrell, Armani White, and Bob Moses. She has also created commissioned works for collectors such as Kevin Jonas of the Jonas Brothers and Abigail Barlow.

In 2023, Kraning co-wrote a one-act play with Claudia Haas titled Soundscapes. The play features a female lead protagonist child with synesthesia, loosely based on Kraning's own life and experience. Soundscapes has been performed globally, including the Edinburgh Festival Fringe in 2025. In 2024, Kraning began her work as an ambassador for conservation nonprofit, Re:wild. HGTV & UPROXX featured Kraning's live painting of the 2024 total solar eclipse, describing how she translated the changing wildlife soundscape before, during, and after totality into a single canvas.

In 2025, Kraning launched the Invisible Worlds project in collaboration with the conservation nonprofit Re:wild, combining paintings inspired by both music and endangered wildlife soundscapes. The artworks were created in partnership with musicians and sold to raise funds for conservation initiatives.
