= Voyelles =

Sonnet by Arthur Rimbaud

- by Arthur Rimbaud
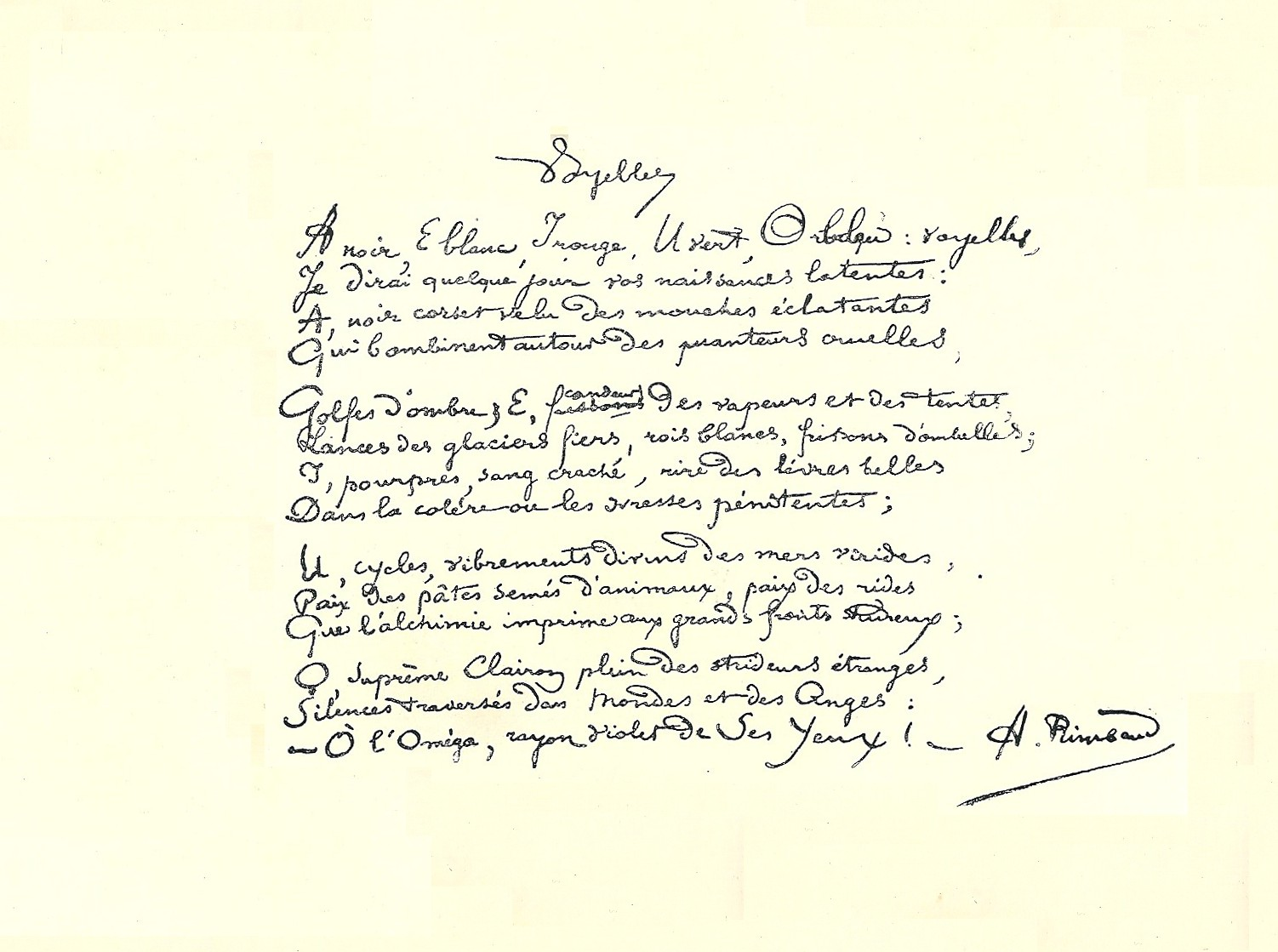
- Autograph manuscript of the poem in the Musée Rimbaud, Charleville-Mézières, Ardennes, France
- Written: 1871
- First published in: Lutèce
- Country: France
- Language: French
- Form: Sonnet
- Publication date: 1883

Full text
- Vowels at Wikisource

A reading in French of Voyelles

"Voyelles" or "Vowels" is a sonnet in alexandrines by Arthur Rimbaud, written in 1871 but first published in 1883. Its theme is the different characters of the vowels, which it associates with those of colours. It has become one of the most studied poems in the French language, provoking very diverse interpretations.

== History ==
At least two early manuscript versions of the sonnet exist: the first is in the hand of Arthur Rimbaud, and was given to Émile Blémont; (Note: An autograph version in the hand of Rimbaud is held in the Musée Rimbaud, Charleville-Mézières.) the second is a transcript by Verlaine. They differ mainly in punctuation, though the second word of the fourth line appears as bombillent in one manuscript and as bombinent in the other. The meaning in both cases is "buzz".

"Voyelles" was written by September 1871 and therefore before Rimbaud's 17th birthday. It was Verlaine who published it, in the 5–12 October 1883 number of the review Lutèce.

== Text ==
The two texts below are of the 1905 Léon Vanier edition, and of a 2015 translation by George J. Dance.

A noir, E blanc, I rouge, U vert, O bleu, voyelles,
Je dirai quelque jour vos naissances latentes.
A, noir corset velu des mouches éclatantes
Qui bombillent autour des puanteurs cruelles,

Golfes d’ombre : E, candeur des vapeurs et des tentes,
Lance des glaciers fiers, rois blancs, frissons d’ombelles;
I, pourpres, sang craché, rire des lèvres belles
Dans la colère ou les ivresses pénitentes;

U, cycles, vibrements divins des mers virides,
Paix des pâtis semés d’animaux, paix des rides
Que l’alchimie imprime aux grands fronts studieux

O, suprême Clairon plein de strideurs étranges,
Silences traversés des Mondes et des Anges :
— O l’Oméga, rayon violet de Ses yeux !

Black A, white E, red I, green U, blue O: you vowels,
Some day I'll tell the tale of where your mystery lies:
Black A, a jacket formed of hairy, shiny flies
That buzz among harsh stinks in the abyss's bowels;

White E, the white of kings, of moon-washed fogs and tents,
Of fields of shivering chervil, glaciers' gleaming tips;
Red I, magenta, spat-up blood, the curl of lips
In laughter, hatred, or besotted penitence;

Green U, vibrating waves in viridescent seas,
Or peaceful pastures flecked with beasts – furrows of peace
Imprinted on our brows as if by alchemies;

Blue O, great Trumpet blaring strange and piercing cries
Through Silences where Worlds and Angels pass crosswise;
Omega, O, the violet brilliance of Those Eyes!

== Interpretations and analyses ==
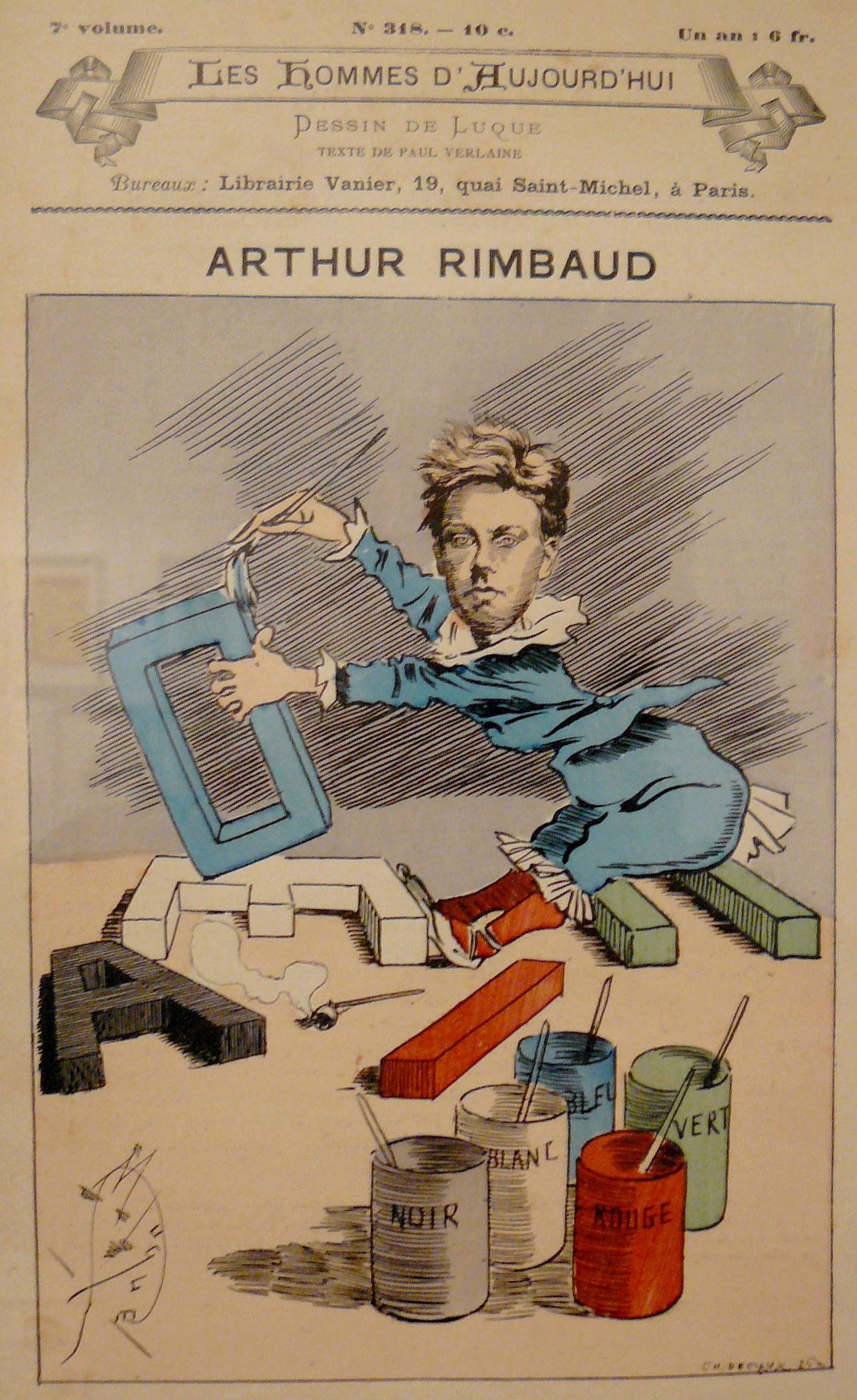
Rimbaud caricatured by Luque in the review Les Hommes d'aujourd'hui in January 1888.

This sonnet has been written about more than almost any other poem in the French language. Many researchers, teachers, and other scholars, such as Ernest Gaubert, Henri de Bouillane de Lacoste & Pierre Izambard, Robert Faurisson, Claude Lévi-Strauss, and Michel Esnault, developed diverse theories on its sources and meaning. It has been suggested, for example, that the poem draws on Rimbaud's memories of children's coloured cubes marked with the letters of the alphabet that he may have handled in his infancy. Others have seen the influence on Rimbaud of his reading of esoteric and cabbalistic literature, or of his own conception of the voyant, "seer", adumbrated in his "Lettre du voyant". According to Robert Faurisson, a secondary school teacher in Vichy in the early 1960s, it is an erotic poem; this interpretation provoked a debate which brought into play the national media, including Le Monde, and several academics, including René Étiemble. It has also been argued by several critics that there is no system behind the choice of correspondances to the various vowels.

=== Claude Lévi-Strauss ===
Claude Lévi-Strauss explained the sonnet, not by the direct relation between vowels and colours stated in the first line, but by an analogy between two oppositions, the opposition between vowels on the one hand, between colours on the other.

While the phoneme /a/ generally evokes the colour red, Rimbaud associates it, like a provocation, with black. In fact, the A (most saturated phoneme) is opposed to E (silent e), as black is opposed to white.

The red of the I, a more truly chromatic colour, then opposes the achromatic black and white that precede it. The green U follows the red I, "the red/green chromatic opposition is maximum like the black/white achromatic opposition which it succeeds". However, from the phonetic point of view, the strongest opposition to the I is the sound ou and not the U: Rimbaud would have chosen to oppose the I to the U, for lack of a French vowel specific to the sound ou.

There remains then only one vowel, the O, but two colours, blue and yellow. Under the blue of the O, the yellow of the Clairon ("Trumpet") appears in the second tercet, as the bright red was underlying the black A in the first quatrain: the O contains the blue/yellow opposition, an opposition analogous to that of red and green. In the last line, blue, the most saturated colour after red, is darkened by mixing it with red, thus referring to the black A at the beginning of the sonnet.
