= John Edmund Califano =

American painter

John Edmund Califano (December 5, 1862 in Rome – June 15, 1946 in Van Nuys), was a student of Domenico Morelli. Califano became a landscape artist, especially noted for his scenes of California and Italy. In 1881, he came to the United States and lived in Chicago until 1908. By 1915, he was in San Francisco and spent the last years of his life in Van Nuys.

Califano exhibited in Naples, Italy in 1880, receiving a gold medal, as well as showing at the Art Institute of Chicago, in 1907; and the National Academy of Design, New York City, 1897–99.
