= Daphne Maurer =

Canadian neuroscientist

Daphne Maurer OC FRSC
- Citizenship: Canadian
- Occupation: Professor of Psychology
- Spouse: Charles Maurer
- Awards: Donald O. Hebb Distinguished Contribution Award (2015)

Academic background
- Education: University of Minnesota
- Doctoral advisor: Philip Salapatek

Daphne Maurer OC FRSC is a Canadian developmental psychologist and professor emeritus in the Department of Psychology, Neuroscience & Behaviour at McMaster University. She is known for her work on the development of visual perception in humans, starting in infancy.

== Early life and education ==
Maurer received a B.A. with honours at Swarthmore College, an M.A. in psychology at the University of Pennsylvania, and a PhD in child development at the University of Minnesota.

== Research and career ==
Maurer's Visual Development Lab at McMaster University focuses on understanding the development of visual perception and, to a lesser extent, on understanding synaesthesia. She has published more than 200 papers in scientific journals, including Nature, Science and Nature Neuroscience. "Her work has reshaped our understanding of the infant's sensory world and its development," according to the citation for the Hebb award.

Maurer's research has mostly been basic science but it has had practical import: it has informed the treatment of congenital cataract and it has shown that some kinds of video game can ameliorate adult amblyopia.

Maurer has also studied the methods, utility, and practicality of screening the vision of kindergarteners throughout the province of Ontario. (Studies of other jurisdictions are not directly applicable because of different medical systems, ethnicity, and geography.) Her research led the Province to begin universal vision screening in senior kindergarten, beginning in the school year 2018–2019.

In 1988, Maurer published with her husband, Charles Maurer, The World of the Newborn, a science book that examines the development of the newborn baby from the baby's perspective. A review published in the Journal of Pediatric Psychology called it "a landmark book; it is among those rare titles that successfully offer a startlingly fresh perspective on their subject matter." "It leads the authors into complex and tantalizing constructions of the baby's sensorium," wrote The New York Times. The World of the Newborn won the book award of the American Psychological Association and was translated into five languages.

In 2019, she and her husband published Pretty Ugly: Why we like some songs, faces, foods, plays, pictures, poems, etc., and dislike others. This combines rigorous science with a cross-cultural history of all the arts to show why and how people (and some animals) develop esthetic preferences.

In 2026 they published a third groundbreaking book, The World Inside Your Head: How Perceptions Build Society. This shows how all social interactions are produced by perceptions, no matter how many people are involved. The book is rooted in basic physical sciences and shows conventional psychological categories to be cultural perceptions rather than reality.

Maurer has commented on child development, vision and synaesthesia for many media outlets including The New York Times and New Scientist. She also has a long interest in research ethics and sat for seven years on Canada's national Interagency Advisory Panel on Research Ethics.

== Awards and honours ==
Maurer is a Fellow of the Royal Society of Canada, of the Association for Psychological Science, and of the American Association for the Advancement of Science. In 2015 she received the Donald O. Hebb Distinguished Contribution Award from the Canadian Society for Brain, Behaviour and Cognitive Science, and in 2026 she received the Distinguished Contribution Award from the International Congress of Infant Studies. In 2011 McMaster awarded her the title Distinguished University Professor, then in 2017 awarded her an honorary degree. In 2024 she was appointed an Officer of the Order of Canada.

== Works ==
- Maurer, D., & Salapatek, P. (1976). Developmental changes in the scanning of faces by young infants. Child Development, 47(2), 523–527.
- Maurer, D., & Barrera, M. (1981). Infants' perception of natural and distorted arrangements of a schematic face. Child Development, 52(1), 196–202.
- Maurer, D., & Maurer, C. The World of the Newborn. New York: Basic Books, 1988.
- Maurer, D., Le Grand, R., & Mondloch, C. J. (2002). The many faces of configural processing. Trends in Cognitive Sciences, 6(6), 255–260.
- Lewis, T. L., & Maurer, D. (2005). Multiple sensitive periods in human visual development: evidence from visually deprived children. Developmental Psychobiology, 46(3), 163–183.
- Maurer, D., Pathman, T., & Mondloch, C. J. (2006). The shape of boubas: Sound–shape correspondences in toddlers and adults. Developmental Science, 9(3), 316–322.
- Mondloch, C. J., Maurer, D., & Ahola, S. (2006). Becoming a face expert. Psychological Science, 17(11), 930–934.
- Maurer, C., & Maurer, D. Pretty Ugly: Why we like some songs, faces, foods, plays, pictures, poems, etc., and dislike others. Newcastle upon Tyne: Cambridge Scholars Publishing, 2019.
