= Patricia Lynne Duffy =

Patricia Lynne Duffy is the author of Blue Cats and Chartreuse Kittens: How Synesthetes Color Their Worlds, the first book by a synesthete about synesthesia. Blue Cats has been reviewed in both the popular press as well as in academic journals, Cerebrum and the APA Review of Books. The book describes Duffy's own experience of synesthesia, as well as that of the many synesthetes she interviewed, along with theories of what causes synesthetic perception.

== Career ==
She is the author of the chapter, "Synesthesia and Literature", included in the Oxford Handbook of Synesthesia (Oxford University Press, 2013). Duffy has given a number of presentations on synesthesia in literature, with an emphasis on her four categories of literary depiction, at universities including the University of Texas at Houston, the Leibniz University Hannover, McMaster University and Vanderbilt University as well as an event hosted by the organization Ediciones Fundación Internacional Artecittà at the University of Granada.

=== Public speaking ===
In addition, she has presented on the topic of synesthesia at a number of universities including Yale University, Princeton University, the University of California, San Diego, Rockefeller University, the University of Virginia, the University of Almería, the University of Jaén, Stockholm University and others. Duffy was invited to be a Plenary Speaker on synesthesia at the "Towards a Science of Consciousness" conference at University of Arizona in Tucson. She is a co-founder of and consultant to the American Synesthesia Association.

=== Teaching career ===
Duffy is an instructor in the UN Language and Communications Programme. She has an M.A. from Teachers College, Columbia University, from which she received the 2009 Distinguished Alumni Award. She is a member of the UN Society of Writers and on the management committee of the UN Staff One Percent for Development Fund as well as the founder of the development fund's Authors-for-Literacy reading series. She has taught English at New York University, the City University of New York, and the UN Language and Communications Programme, including staff training abroad at UN offices in Addis Ababa, Arusha, Entebbe, Kigali, Monrovia, Nairobi, and Port-au-Prince.

=== Writing career ===
Her article on development micro-projects, "Kitengesa, Uganda: Happy Developments" was published on the web site of Carnegie Council for Ethics in International Affairs. In addition, Duffy has written articles for publications including New York Newsday, the San Francisco Chronicle (article "All the Colors of the Rainbow"), the Boston Globe, and the Village Voice. Duffy wrote two award-winning essays, "Taipei Tales" and "Dining in French" for the literary journal Literal Latte. Her work is included in the anthologies They Only Laughed Later: Tales of Women on the Move (Europublic Press) and Soulful Living (HCI). She has traveled extensively throughout Europe and Asia and lived and worked in China for a year and a half.

== Personal life ==
Her interest is in what she terms "personal coding", the unique way in which each person codes information and makes a one-of-a-kind "inner map" of the world around them. She has been interviewed about her research and her synesthesia by a number of publications including the New York Times, the Washington Post, Smithsonian magazine, Discover Magazine, and Newsweek, as well as on TV and radio channels such as National Public Radio, the BBC, Public Radio International and the Discovery Channel.
