= Grapheme–color synesthesia =

Synesthesia that associates numbers or letters with colors

How someone with grapheme–color synesthesia might perceive (not "see") certain letters and numbers

Grapheme–color synesthesia or colored grapheme synesthesia is a form of synesthesia in which an individual's perception of numerals and letters is associated with the experience of colors. Graphemes are essentially phonetic building blocks for languages, such as letters in the alphabet. Like all forms of synesthesia, grapheme–color synesthesia is involuntary, consistent and memorable. Grapheme–color synesthesia is one of the most common forms of synesthesia and, because of the extensive knowledge of the visual system, one of the most studied.

While it is extremely unlikely that any two synesthetes will report the same colors for all letters and numbers, studies of large numbers of synesthetes find that there are some commonalities across letters (e.g., "A" is likely to be red). Early studies argued that grapheme–color synesthesia was not due to associative learning. However, one recent study has documented a case of synesthesia in which synesthetic associations could be traced back to colored refrigerator magnets. Despite the existence of this individual case, the majority of synesthetic associations do not seem to be driven by learning of this sort. Rather, it seems that more frequent letters are paired with more frequent colors, and some meaning-based rules, such as ‘b’ being blue, drive most synesthetic associations.

There has been a lot more research as to why and how synesthesia occurs with more recent technology and as synesthesia has become more well known. It has been found that grapheme–color synesthetes have more grey matter in their brain. There is evidence of an increased grey matter volume in the left caudal intraparietal sulcus (IPS). There was also found to be an increased grey matter volume in the right fusiform gyrus. These results are consistent with another study on the brain functioning of grapheme–color synesthetes. Grapheme–color synesthetes tend to have an increased thickness, volume and surface area of the fusiform gyrus. Furthermore, the area of the brain where word, letter and color processing are located, V4a, is where the most significant difference in make-up was found. Though not certain, these differences are thought to be part of the reasoning for the presence of grapheme–color synesthesia.

== Experiences and reports ==
Synesthetes often report that they were unaware their experiences were unusual until they realized other people did not have them, while others report feeling as if they had been keeping a secret their entire lives. Many synesthetes can vividly remember when they first noticed their synesthetic experiences, or when they first learned that such experiences were unusual. Writer and synesthete Patricia Lynne Duffy remembers one early experience:

"'One day,' I said to my father, 'I realized that to make an 'R' all I had to do was first write a 'P' and then draw a line down from its loop. And I was so surprised that I could turn a yellow letter into an orange letter just by adding a line.'"

As does filmmaker and actress Stephanie Morgenstern:

"A few years ago, I mentioned to a friend that I remembered phone numbers by their colour. He said "So you're a synesthete!" I hadn't heard of synesthesia (which means something close to 'sense-fusion') – I only knew that numbers seemed naturally to have colours: five is blue, two is green, three is red… And music has colours too: the key of C# minor is a sharp, tangy yellow, F major is a warm brown..."

Many synesthetes never realize that their experiences are in any way unusual or exceptional. For example, the Nobel Prize winning physicist Richard Feynman reports:

When I see equations, I see the letters in colors – I don't know why. As I'm talking, I see vague pictures of Bessel functions from Jahnke and Emde's book, with light-tan j's, slightly violet-bluish n's, and dark brown x's flying around. And I wonder what the hell it must look like to the students."

While synesthetes sometimes report seeing colors projected in space, they do not confuse their synesthetic colors with real colors in the external world. Rather, they report that they are simultaneously aware of the external color and also the internal, synesthetic color:

As C relates ... "It is difficult to explain...I see what you see. I know the numbers are in black...but as soon as I recognise the form of a 7 it has to be yellow."

Finally, synesthetes are quite precise in the color mappings that they experience, which can lead them to make quite detailed comparisons of their colors:

I came back from college on a semester break, and was sitting with my family around the dinner table, and – I don't know why I said it – but I said, "The number five is yellow." There was a pause, and my father said, "No, it's yellow-ochre." And my mother and my brother looked at us like, 'this is a new game, would you share the rules with us?'"

And I was dumbfounded. So I thought, "Well." At that time in my life I was having trouble deciding whether the number two was green and the number six blue, or just the other way around. And I said to my father, "Is the number two green?" and he said, "Yes, definitely. It's green." And then he took a long look at my mother and my brother and became very quiet.

Thirty years after that, he came to my loft in Manhattan and he said, "you know, the number four *is* red, and the number zero is white. And," he said, "the number nine is green." I said, "Well, I agree with you about the four and the zero, but nine is definitely not green!"

== Further research ==
Individuals with grapheme–color synesthesia rarely claim that their sensations are problematic or unwanted. In some cases, individuals report useful effects, such as aid in memory or spelling of difficult words.

I sometimes use my synaesthesia to help me remember difficult proper names. Here's a Thai chef who wrote a terrific vegetarian cookbook [these letters appear in a distinct pattern for Cassidy]:

- Vatcharin Bhumichitr

Unfortunately, this method can backfire too, because I confuse similarly colored names easily [the following names appear very similarly colored to Cassidy]:

- Mike
- Dave
- Dan
- Rob

This is especially problematic at parties.

— Cassidy Curtis, "Letter-Color Synaesthesia"

These experiences have led to the development of technologies intended to improve the retention and memory of graphemes by individuals without synesthesia. Computers, for instance, could use "artificial synesthesia" to color words and numbers to improve usability. A somewhat related example of "computer-aided synesthesia" is using letter coloring in a web browser to prevent IDN homograph attacks. (Someone with synesthesia can sometimes distinguish between barely different looking characters in a similar way.)
