= Deathswitch =

- Dissolved: October 22, 2015; 10 years ago
- Creator: David Eagleman
- Launched: 2006; 20 years ago
- Current status: Defunct

Deathswitch was a website that allowed users to store encrypted emails, to be sent out at the time of their death. This was determined by the user entering a password at preset intervals. If the password was not entered after several prompts, the emails would be sent out to the indicated email recipients. The service announced its shutdown on October 22, 2015.
