= Livewire =

Livewire(s), Live Wire(s), The Live Wire or Live Wired may refer to:

- Live wire (electricity), a wire with a flow of electric current

== Computers ==
- Livewire (networking), a digital audio networking technology
- LiveWire Professional, computer software for stock market analysis
- Livewire Segmentation Technique, an image segmentation technique

== Entertainment ==
=== Comics ===
- Live Wire (comics), several comics-related characters and series including:
  - Live Wire (DC Comics) or Garth Ranzz, more commonly known as Lightning Lad, a member of the Legion of Super-Heroes
  - Live Wire (Marvel Comics), a supervillain in the Marvel Comics universe
  - Livewire (DC Comics), a supervillain in the DC Comics universe
  - Livewire (Valiant Comics) or Amanda McKee, a superhero in the Valiant Comics Universe
  - Livewires (comics), a Marvel Comics series

=== Film ===
- The Live Wire (1917 film), a British lost silent film starring Ronald Colman
- The Live Wire (1925 film), an American silent film starring Johnny Hines
- The Live Wire (1935 film), an American film directed by Harry S. Webb
- The Live Wire (1937 film), a UK film directed by Herbert Brenon
- Live Wire (film), a 1992 film starring Pierce Brosnan
- Live Wires (1921 film), American silent drama film
- Live Wires (1946 film), starring The Bowery Boys

=== TV and radio ===
- Live Wire Radio, a syndicated live radio variety show, Portland, Oregon
- Livewire (radio station), a student-run radio station at University of East Anglia, Norwich, UK
- "Livewire" (Superman: The Animated Series), an episode of Superman: The Animated Series
- "Livewire" (Supergirl), an episode of the CBS television series Supergirl
- Livewire (talk show), a 1980s teen talk show on Nickelodeon
- Livewire (Wellington), a radio station run by Wellington High School
- WWF LiveWire, a World Wrestling Federation TV series, 1996 to 2001

=== Music ===
- Live Wire (album), a 2004 album by Third Day
- Live Wire (Maren Morris album), 2011
- The Live Wire: Woody Guthrie in Performance 1949, a 2007 album by Woody Guthrie
- Live Wire, a 1997 Lowen & Navarro album
- Live Wire, a 2000 album by Steve Goodman
- Live Wired, a 1996 album by Front Line Assembly
- Live Wires (album), a 1992 album by Yellowjackets
- "Live Wires", a 2004 album by Stratospheerius
- "Live Wire" (Martha and the Vandellas song), 1964
- "Live Wire" (Mötley Crüe song), 1981
- "Live Wire", a song from the 1975 album T.N.T. by AC/DC
- "Livewire", a 2015 song from the album Oh Wonder by Oh Wonder
- "Live Wire", a song from the 2004 album 7th Issue by Seo Taiji
- "Live Wire", a song from the 2019 album Threads by Sheryl Crow
- "Livewire", a song from the 2020 EP Falling Asleep at the Wheel by Holly Humberstone

=== Literature ===
- Live Wire (novel), a 2011 novel by Harlan Coben
- The Live Wire (magazine), a short-lived 1908 pulp magazine
- Livewire (magazine), rock music magazine 1991–1997
- Livewired (Livewired: The Inside Story of the Ever-Changing Brain), a 2020 book about neuroscience by David Eagleman

=== Other entertainment ===
- Live Wire, an art installation by Natalie Jeremijenko
- Live Wire!, a game developed by Square Enix Europe (SCI/Eidos)
- LiveWire Chicago Theatre, a non-profit theater arts organization

== People ==
- Stephen Maguire (born 1981), Scottish snooker player nicknamed "Livewire"
- Tim Shieff (born 1988), English freerunner and traceur nicknamed "Livewire"

== Other uses ==
- LiveWire (motorcycle), a motorcycle
- LiveWire (company), a spin off electric motorcycle company from Harley Davidson
- Mountain Dew LiveWire, a soft drink

== See also ==
- Live Wire/Blues Power, a 1968 album by Albert King
