= Wednesday Is Indigo Blue =

Book by Richard Cytowic

- Author: Richard Cytowic & David Eagleman
- Cover artist: Morris Louis, Point of Tranquility
- Language: English
- Subject: Synesthesia, Neuroscience, Cognition
- Publisher: MIT Press
- Publication date: April 2009
- Publication place: United States
- Media type: Hardcover
- Pages: 309, 11 color illustrations
- ISBN: 0-262-01279-0
- OCLC: 233697438
- Dewey Decimal: 612.8/233 22
- LC Class: RC394.S93 C964 2009
- Preceded by: The Man Who Tasted Shapes

Wednesday Is Indigo Blue: Discovering the Brain of Synesthesia is a 2009 non-fiction book written by Richard Cytowic and David Eagleman documenting the current scientific understanding of synesthesia, a perceptual condition where an experience of one sense (such as sight) causes an automatic and involuntary experience in another sense (such as hearing). The afterword is written by Dimitri Nabokov, a synesthete, and the son of the well-known author and synesthete Vladimir Nabokov.

== Synopsis ==
The introduction likens the "cross-talk" occurring in the brain producing synesthetic experiences to weather patterns in coastal regions where there are no barriers and all of the elements interact. Normally communication in the brain is like weather in the Rocky Mountain regions, where weather can be isolated in one spot independent of weather systems close by. Chapter 1, "What color is Tuesday?", describes some of the early and still common resistance to the existence and study of synesthesia, and explains the fundamental characteristics necessary to "diagnose" synesthesia. The authors advocate the usefulness of introspective reports as they can later be useful in developing third-party tests for such purposes. Form constants are introduced as part of a framework to study visual synesthetic concurrents (the involuntary response in another sense). Chapter 2 builds on Chapter 1, discussing the types of synesthesia and the methods used to make a synesthesia diagnosis such as variations on stroop tests. The potential benefits of synesthesia are expanded on, including its correlation with eidetic memory and experience of a wider ranger of color. Chapter 3 discusses grapheme-color synesthesia in detail and describes the case of Solomon Shereshevsky.

== Reception ==
In interviews related to the book Cytowic has discussed the evolutionary purpose of synesthesia, whether it is an adaptive product of natural selection or is more like a kind of spandrel. In Cytowic's responses he has mentioned the relationship between synesthesia and creativity suggesting that because synesthesia is associated with creativity it is adaptive. In his interview with Jonah Lehrer he maintained that this is one of the reasons why its prevalence, estimated at one in twenty-three people, is so high. Cytowic also suggested synesthesia could be expressed in non-sensory parts of the brain (e.g. memory, planning and moral reasoning) increasing creativity in relation to those subjects as well. Conversely, the increased communication could be expressed even more diffusely in the brain, resulting in a generalized talent for connecting apparently unrelated topics.

In an interview with Seed Magazine Eagleman explained further that the genes responsible for the increased communication in synesthetes may also be present in non-synesthetes, but there would be additional difficulties researching this phenomenon as there would be no perceptual correlates allowing researches to identify such people. He added that he is researching spot thought to be related to Grapheme-color synesthesia on chromosome sixteen.

In her review of the book, New Scientist columnist Lize Else described Cytowic as a pioneer in synesthesia research. She used a phrase from the authors to explain the correlation between synesthesia and creativity, namely that synesthesia eases the process of making "metaphoric cross-connections" between different areas in the brain.

== See also ==
- List of people with synesthesia
- Born on a Blue Day by Daniel Tammet
