= Richard Cytowic =

American neurologist and author

Richard E. Cytowic
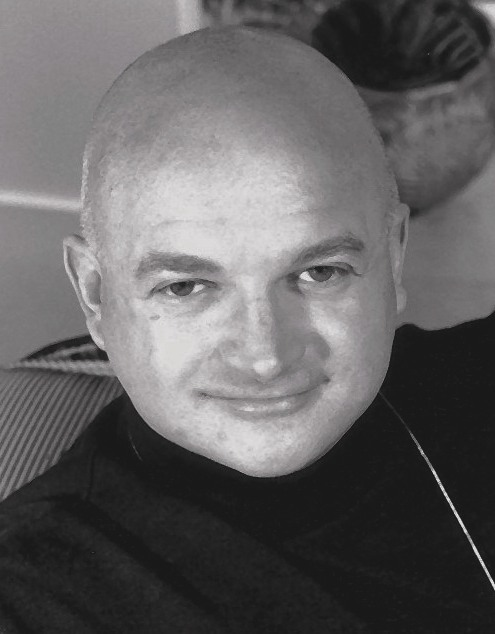
- Born: December 16, 1952 (age 73); Trenton, New Jersey, U.S.
- Education: Duke University, Wake Forest, American University
- Known for: Synesthesia, Neuropsychology, Nonfiction writing
- Awards: Montaigne Medal 2011, Pulitzer Prize nominee, Artist Fellow, DC Commission on the Arts and Humanities, Albert Nelson Marquis Lifetime Achievement Award
- Scientific career
- Fields: Neuroscience
- Workplaces: George Washington University School of Medicine & Health Sciences
- Website: Web site

Richard E. Cytowic is an American neurologist and author who rekindled interest in synesthesia in the 1980s and returned it to mainstream science. He was nominated for the Pulitzer Prize for his New York Times Magazine cover story about James Brady, the Presidential Press Secretary shot in the brain during the assassination attempt on President Reagan. Cytowic’s writing ranges from textbooks and music reviews, to his Metro Weekly "Love Doctor" essays and brief medical biographies of Anton Chekhov, Maurice Ravel and Virginia Woolf. His work is the subject of two BBC Horizon documentaries, “Orange Sherbert Kisses” (1994) and “Derek Tastes of Earwax” (2014).

In Musicophilia, Oliver Sacks writes:

In the 1980, Richard Cytowic made the first neurophysiological studies of synesthetic subjects... In 1989, he published a pioneering text, Synesthesia: A Union of the Senses, and this was followed by a popular exploration of the subject in 1993, The Man Who Tasted Shapes. Current techniques of functional brain imaging now give unequivocal evidence for the simultaneous activation or coactivation of two or more sensory areas of the cerebral cortex in synesthetes, just as Cytowic’s work predicted.

Of Wednesday is Indigo Blue, co–authored by Cytowic and David Eagleman, Sacks said, “Their work has changed the way we think of the human brain, and [it] is a unique and indispensable guide for anyone interested in how we perceive the world.” The book won the 2011 Montaigne Medal.

Cytowic is a Professor of Neurology at George Washington University School of Medicine & Health Sciences, a Mentor at the Point Foundation, and a member of the Advisory Board for Williams Institute at the UCLA School of Law.

== Biography ==
Cytowic was born on December 16, 1952, in Trenton, New Jersey, to a physician father and artist mother, and grew up with an extended family of scientists and artists. His mother is ESPN's "Super Nana Marge", Tim Tebow's No. 1 fan. As a child, Cytowic liked taking things apart and putting them back together to figure out how they worked.

He attended Hun School of Princeton (class of 1970), graduated cum laude from Duke University, and received his M.D. from Wake Forest's Bowman Gray School of Medicine. He studied further at London's Queen Square (Institute of Neurology), and George Washington University School of Medicine & Health Sciences before founding a private clinic, Capitol Neurology. He also holds a Master of Fine Arts in creative writing from American University (2011).

Retired from clinical practice, Cytowic now mentors medical students at George Washington University School of Medicine & Health Sciences, where he teaches patient-centered medicine, emphasizing that students should treat patients as individuals, not just cases. His views on medical education go beyond what’s typically covered in his scientific bios. He also writes academic and popular nonfiction, and lectures at museums and cultural institutions worldwide such as the Istanbul Biennial. With installation artist Marcos Lutyens he designed an interactive project at the Los Angeles Main Museum, “A Semantic Survey of Emotions.” During his North Carolina years, he served as music critic for the Winston-Salem Journal.

== Works ==
Books

- Your Stone Age Brain in the Screen Age: Coping with Digital Distraction and Sensory Overload (2024). Cambridge: MIT Press, Essential Knowledge Series.
- Synesthesia (2018). Cambridge: MIT Press, Essential Knowledge Series.
- The Oxford Handbook of Synesthesia (2014). Oxford: Oxford University Press, 2013. ISBN 978-0-199-60332-9
- Wednesday is Indigo Blue: Discovering the Brain of Synesthesia (with David Eagleman), Foreword by Dmitri Nabokov (2009). Cambridge: MIT Press. ISBN 978-0-262-01279-9
- The Man Who Tasted Shapes (2003). Cambridge: MIT Press. ISBN 978-0-262-53255-6
- Synesthesia: A Union of The Senses, 2nd edition (2002). Cambridge: MIT Press. ISBN 978-0-262-03296-4
- The Neurological Side of Neuropsychology (1996). Cambridge: MIT Press. ISBN 978-0-262-03231-5
- Nerve Block For Common Pain (1990). New York: Springer Verlag. ISBN 0-387-97147-5

Reviews and essays

- Selected book reviews available at the New York Journal of Books.
- Selected Love Doctor essays available here.
- Chekhov and Ravel articles available here.

Lectures

- Two TED-Ed lessons on "What Percentage of Your Brain Do You Use?" and "What Color is Tuesday?"
- A filmed gallery talk on synesthesia at Washington's Hirshhorn Museum, given as part of its visual music exhibit.
- A PBS conversation between Dr. Cytowic and Dr. Richard Frakowiak (London).
- Selected Television and Radio appearances.

== Artistic fellowships ==
- Hambidge Center for Creative Arts & Sciences, Rabun Gap, Georgia. Founded on the estate of Jay Hambidge, the architect and mathematician who conceived of "Dynamic Symmetry".
- Morris & Gwendolyn Cafritz Foundation Fellow, Virginia Center for Creative Arts
