= Live Wire (comics) =

Live Wire or Livewire, in comics, may refer to:

- Live Wire (Marvel Comics), a Marvel Comics supervillain
- Live Wire (DC Comics), an alias of the Legion of Super-Heroes member Garth Ranzz, a.k.a. Lightning Lad
- Livewire (DC Comics), a DC Comics supervillainess
- Livewire (Valiant Comics), a Valiant Comics character
- Livewires (comics), a Marvel Comics series
- Livewire, a character from Savage Dragon and a member of the Vicious Circle

== See also ==
- Livewire (disambiguation)
