= Incognito: The Secret Lives of the Brain =

2011 book by David Eagleman

- Book cover
- Author: David Eagleman
- Language: English
- Subject: Neuroscience
- Genre: Science
- Published: May 31, 2011, Pantheon (US), Canongate (UK)
- Media type: Hardcover, paperback, audiobook, e-Book
- ISBN: 0-307-37733-4 978-0307377333

Incognito: The Secret Lives of the Brain is a 2011 New York Times best-selling nonfiction book by American neuroscientist David Eagleman, an adjunct professor at Stanford University. The book explores the juxtaposition of the conscious and the unconscious mind, with Eagleman summing up the text's themes with the question: "If the conscious mind—the part you consider to be you—is just the tip of the iceberg, what is the rest doing?"

In Incognito, Eagleman contends that most of the operations of the brain are inaccessible to awareness, such that the conscious mind "is like a stowaway on a transatlantic steam ship, taking credit for the journey without acknowledging the massive engineering underfoot."

== Overview ==
Incognito presents Eagleman's personal neuroscientific beliefs rather than detailed science or philosophy. It offers an enthusiastic exploration of how modern neuroscience reshapes our understanding of human nature and consciousness, focusing on its broader implications as a worldview rather than on technical or philosophical analysis.

Eagleman argues that just as past scientific discoveries displaced humankind from the cosmic center, brain science reveals that consciousness is not central to the mind but a small, uncertain part of vast unconscious processes, where most mental activity operates "incognito".

== Reception ==
Incognito appeared on the New York Times best-sellers list intermittently in 2011 and 2012. It was named a Best Book of 2011 by Amazon, the Boston Globe, and the Houston Chronicle.

The book was reviewed as "appealing and persuasive" by the Wall Street Journal and "a shining example of lucid and easy-to-grasp science writing" by The Independent. A starred review from Kirkus Reviews described it as "a book that will leave you looking at yourself—and the world—differently."

In July 2011, Eagleman discussed Incognito with Stephen Colbert on The Colbert Report.
