= Sum: Forty Tales from the Afterlives =

2009 book by David Eagleman

- First edition (US)
- Author: David Eagleman
- Language: English
- Publisher: Pantheon Books (US); Canongate Books (UK)
- Publication date: February 10, 2009
- Publication place: United States
- Media type: Print hardback; paperback; audiobook; e-book
- Pages: 107 (Hardback, 2009)
- ISBN: 978-0-307-37734-0 (Hardcover, 2009)
- OCLC: 228676738
- Dewey Decimal: 813/.6 22
- LC Class: PS3605.A375 S86 2009

Sum: Forty Tales from the Afterlives, also simply called Sum, is a work of speculative fiction by American neuroscientist David Eagleman. It is in press in 28 languages as of 2016. The Los Angeles Times described it as "teeming, writhing with imagination." Barnes and Noble named it one of the Best Books of 2009.

== Overview ==
As a short story cycle, the book presents forty mutually exclusive stories staged in a wide variety of possible afterlives. The author has stated that none of the stories is meant to be taken as serious theological proposals but, instead, that the message of the book is the importance of exploring new ideas beyond the ones that have been traditionally passed down.

Like Italo Calvino's Invisible Cities, Sum does not fit entirely into the traditional category of a novel. Sum has been called "philosofiction", an "experimental novel", and "a collection of thought experiments". Most of the stories are understood to "posit the afterlife as mirroring life on Earth"

The New York Times Book Review called Sum a "delightful, thought-provoking little collection [which] belongs to that category of strange, unclassifiable books that will haunt the reader long after the last page has been turned". Sum was chosen by Time magazine for their 2009 Summer Reading list, with the acclaim "Eagleman is a true original. Read Sum and be amazed. Reread Sum and be reamazed.". Sum was selected as Book of the Week by both The Guardian and The Week and was the featured subject on the cover of two magazines in 2009, The Big Issue and Humanitie. On September 10, 2009, Sum was ranked by Amazon as the #2 best-selling book in the United Kingdom.

The book received accolades from non-religious reviewers as well as from the religious community. The recommendations of Stephen Fry, Philip Pullman, Brian Greene, Brian Eno, and others appear on the cover. In 2018, Tim Ferriss wrote in his newsletter, "Don't let the title of this book fool you; it isn't making a case for the afterlife. Instead, this short read... is a collection of 40 thought exercises on the nature of existence, reality, perception, death, pain, boredom, and more. It's remarkably elegant and fun. At the very least, it should make you appreciate your own life — warts and all — much more."

== Philosophy ==
Eagleman refers to himself as a possibilian and to Sum as a reflection of that position. According to his definition, possibilianism rejects both the idiosyncratic claims of traditional theism and the certainty of atheism in favor of a middle, exploratory ground. The possibilian perspective is distinguished from agnosticism in that it consists of an active exploration of novel possibilities and an emphasis on holding multiple hypotheses at once when no data is available to privilege one position over the others. Possibilianism is understood to be consonant with the "scientific temperament" of creativity and tolerance for multiple ideas when there is a lack of data. Speaking with The New York Times, Eagleman stated that he was working on a book entitled Why I Am a Possibilian.

== Related publications and performances ==
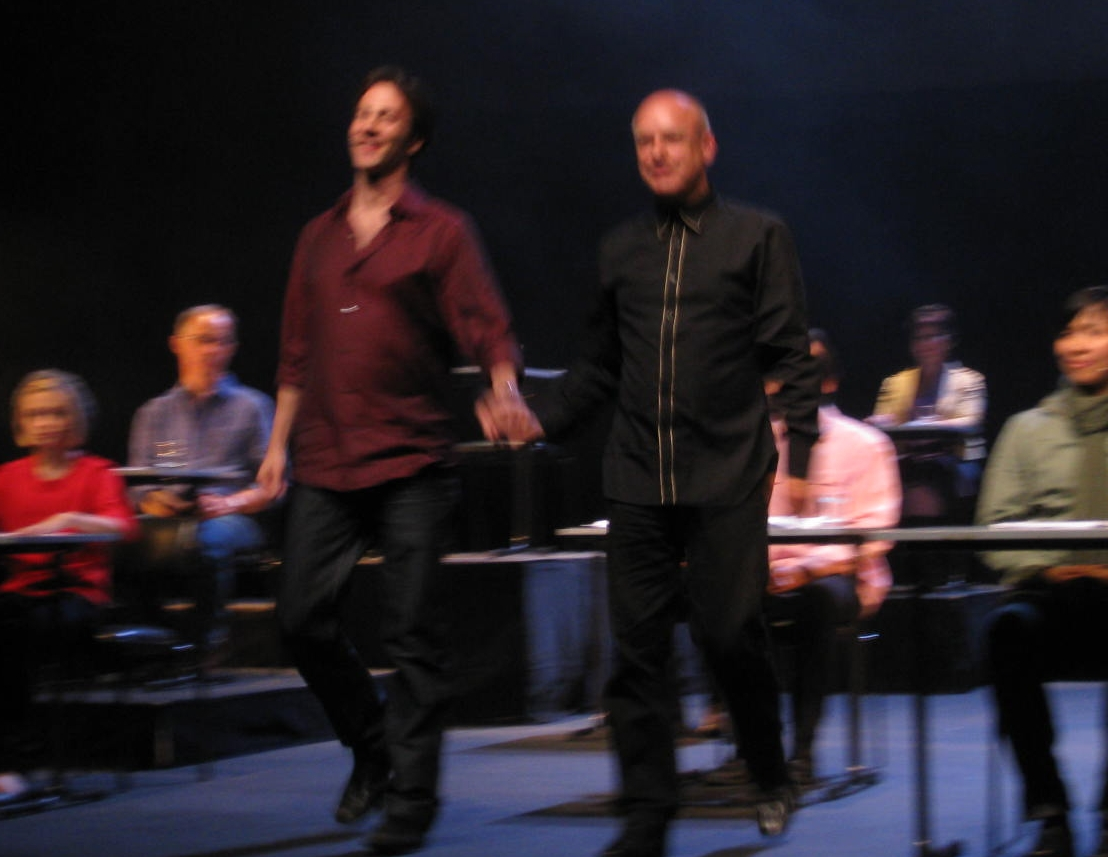
David Eagleman and Brian Eno performing Sum at the Sydney Opera House, June 6, 2009.

In June 2009, Eagleman and musician Brian Eno performed a musical reading of Sum at the Sydney Opera House in Australia.

In May 2010, Sum debuted as an opera at the Royal Opera House in London. The music was composed by Max Richter, with choreography by Wayne McGregor.

A September 2009 episode of Radiolab featured a discussion with Eagleman and readings of two of the stories by actor Jeffrey Tambor.

The scientific journal Nature originally published one of the stories in Sum, "A Brief History of Death Switches". This story was subsequently anthologized in Futures from Nature.

The audiobook of Sum was narrated by Eagleman as well as by Gillian Anderson, Emily Blunt, Nick Cave, Jarvis Cocker, Jack Davenport, Lisa Dwan, Noel Fielding, Kerry Fox, Stephen Fry, Clarke Peters, Lemn Sissay, and Harriet Walter. In 2010, Canongate Books released an iOS enhanced eBook version of Sum, integrating the audiobook with the text.

Readings from the book are featured in a number of episodes of the Canadian Broadcasting Corporation's radio programme WireTap:

"WireTap" episode	Featured Sum story	Read by	Reference
"Circle of Friends"	"Circle of Friends"		
"26 Minutes, 30 Seconds"	"Sum"	Jane Lewis	
"All Beasts Go to Heaven"	"Descent of Species"	Katie Malik	
"We Are But the Stuff of Dreams"	"The Cast"	Jane Lewis	
"The Answering Machine"	"Spirals"	Jane Lewis	
"Adhesion"	"Adhesion"	Elizabeth Robertson	
"Getting Away From It All"	"Angst"	Jane Lewis	
"A Better You"	"Subjunctive"	Elizabeth Robertson	
"The Reverse Life"	"Reversal"	Katie Malik	
