= Possibilianism =

Theory rejecting dogmatic theism and atheism

Possibilianism is a philosophy that rejects both the diverse claims of traditional theism and the positions of certainty in strong atheism in favor of a middle, exploratory ground. The word was coined by Robbie Parrish, a friend of neuroscientist David Eagleman who defined the term in relation to his 2009 book, Sum: Forty Tales from the Afterlives.

== History ==
Asked whether he was an atheist or a religious person on a National Public Radio interview in February 2009, Eagleman replied "I call myself a Possibilian: I'm open to...ideas that we don't have any way of testing right now." In a subsequent interview with the New York Times, Eagleman expanded on the definition:

"Our ignorance of the cosmos is too vast to commit to atheism, and yet we know too much to commit to a particular religion. A third position, agnosticism, is often an uninteresting stance in which a person simply questions whether his traditional religious story (say, a man with a beard on a cloud) is true or not true. But with Possibilianism I'm hoping to define a new position — one that emphasizes the exploration of new, unconsidered possibilities. Possibilianism is comfortable holding multiple ideas in mind; it is not interested in committing to any particular story."

In a New Yorker profile of Eagleman—entitled "The Possibilian"—Burkhard Bilger wrote:

Science had taught him to be skeptical of cosmic certainties, [Eagleman] told me. From the unfathomed complexity of brain tissue—"essentially an alien computational material"—to the mystery of dark matter, we know too little about our own minds and the universe around us to insist on strict atheism, he said. "And we know far too much to commit to a particular religious story." Why not revel in the alternatives? Why not imagine ourselves, as he did in Sum, as bits of networked hardware in a cosmic program, or as particles of some celestial organism, or any of a thousand other possibilities, and then test those ideas against the available evidence? "Part of the scientific temperament is this tolerance for holding multiple hypotheses in mind at the same time," he said. "As Voltaire said, uncertainty is an uncomfortable position. But certainty is an absurd one."

An adherent of possibilianism is called a possibilian. The possibilian perspective is distinguished from agnosticism in its active exploration of novel possibilities and its emphasis on the necessity of holding multiple positions at once if there is no available data to privilege one over the others. Eagleman has emphasized that possibilianism reflects the scientific temperament of creativity and intellectual humility in the face of "the known unknowns."

== Reception ==
According to the Dallas Morning News and MSNBC, the possibilian concept—including various spellings (e.g. "possibillion") and modifications (e.g. "possibilitarian")—has become popular on the internet. By November 2009, The List Magazine wrote: "Googling 'possibilian', the position Eagleman invented to explain his belief system, throws up the beginnings of a worldwide movement."

Articles about possibilianism have appeared in major news outlets around the globe—for example, in the Daily Monitor of Uganda, The Economic Times and New Scientist.

In an article in the New Statesman, the atheist author Philip Pullman declared himself a possibilian, as did Wired magazine founding editor Kevin Kelly in an interview in the LA Times. By April 2011, "close to a thousand Facebook members had switched their religious affiliation to Possibilianism."

=== Criticism ===
Sam Harris (a new atheist) has attacked possibilianism as "intellectually dishonest", and its description of strict atheism as a straw man. Harris writes that the position Eagleman espouses "is, simply, atheism." Harris calls on Eagleman "to admit that “possibilianism,” this middle position of yours, is just a piece of performance art, rather than a serious thesis." In response, Eagleman stated that "[Harris'] braggadocio appears to be emblematic of the neo-atheist posture, and confirms why I don't feel completely at home in that camp." Journalist Steve Volk in the Huffington Post suggested that Harris and Eagleman should be "new allies": "If we're going to get beyond the typical exchanges between new atheists and the religious, I'd argue that it's through figures like Eagleman and Harris that we will find the most productive path: men who are eager to use science while demonstrating a capacity to consider ideas from other areas of human experience and systems of thought."

== See also ==
- Ignosticism
- Transtheism
- Theological noncognitivism
- Logical positivism
- Naturalism (philosophy)
- Atheism
