= Ideasthesia =

Phenomenon in which concepts evoke sensory experiences

Example of associations between graphemes and colors that are described more accurately as ideasthesia than as synesthesia

Ideasthesia (alternative spelling ideaesthesia) is a neuropsychological phenomenon in which activations of concepts (inducers) evoke perception-like sensory experiences (concurrents). The name comes from the Ancient Greek ἰδέα (idéa) and αἴσθησις (aísthēsis), meaning 'sensing concepts' or 'sensing ideas'. The notion was introduced by neuroscientist Danko Nikolić, but can be seen in examples in the Ethics of Spinoza (especially in the third part of the Ethics), as an alternative explanation for a set of phenomena traditionally covered by synesthesia.

While synesthesia meaning 'union of senses' implies the association of two sensory elements with little connection to the cognitive level, empirical evidence indicated that most phenomena linked to synesthesia are in fact induced by semantic representations. That is, the linguistic meaning of the stimulus is what is important rather than its sensory properties. In other words, while synesthesia presumes that both the trigger (inducer) and the resulting experience (concurrent) are of sensory nature, ideasthesia presumes that only the resulting experience is of sensory nature while the trigger is semantic.

Research has later extended the concept to topics other than synesthesia, and since it turned out to be applicable to everyday perception, the concept has developed into a theory of how we perceive. For example ideasthesia has been applied to the theory of art and could bear important implications in explaining human conscious experience, which, according to ideasthesia, is grounded in how we activate concepts.

== Examples and evidence ==
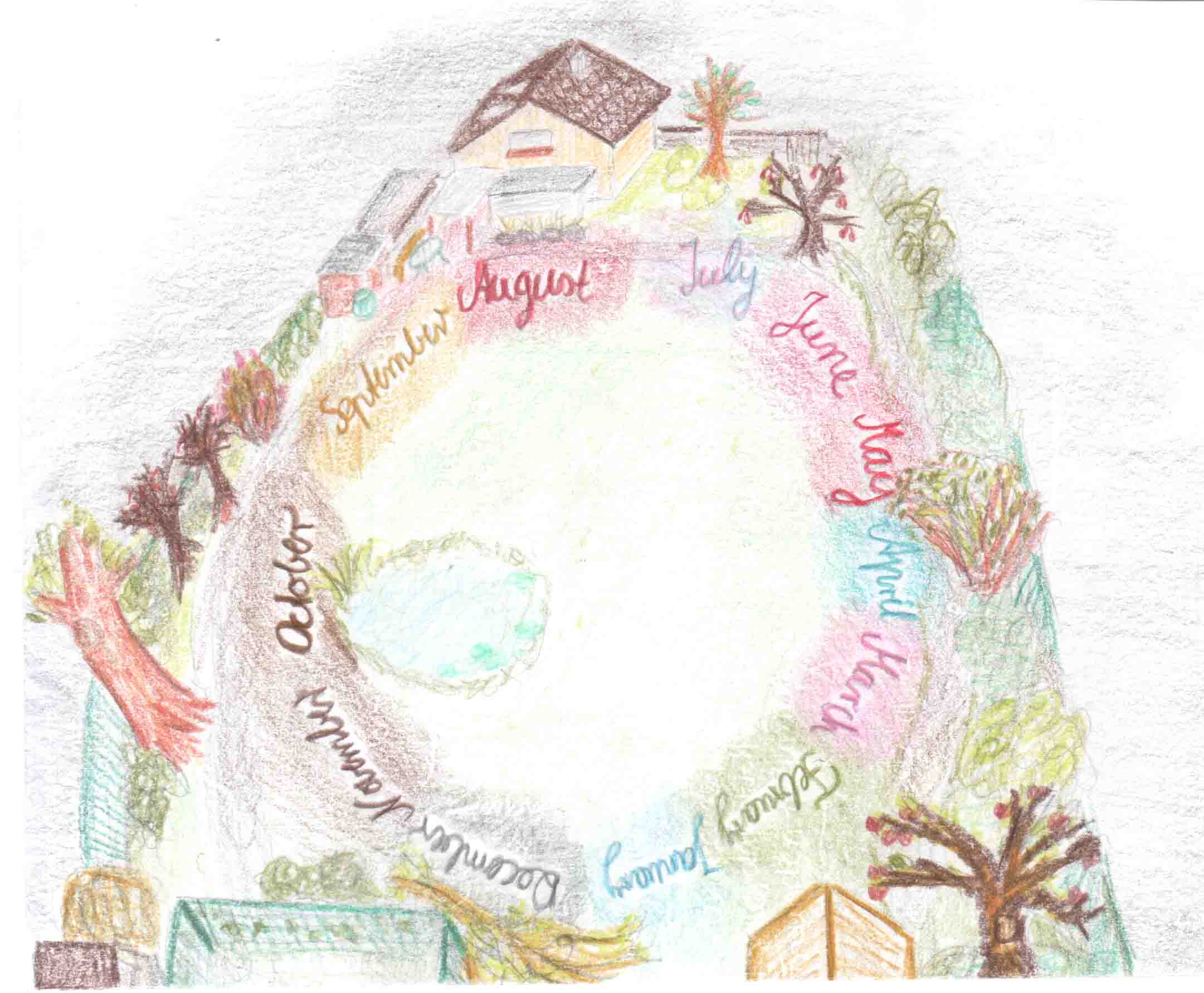
A drawing by a synesthete which illustrates time unit-space synesthesia/ideasthesia. The months in a year are organized into a circle surrounding the synesthete's body, each month having a fixed location in space and a unique color.

A common example of synesthesia is the association between graphemes and colors, usually referred to as grapheme–color synesthesia. Here, letters of the alphabet are associated with vivid experiences of color. Studies have indicated that the perceived color is context-dependent and is determined by the extracted meaning of a stimulus. For example, an ambiguous stimulus '5' that can be interpreted either as 'S' or '5' will have the color associated with 'S' or with '5', depending on the context in which it is presented. If presented among numbers, it will be interpreted as '5' and will associate the respective color. If presented among letters, it will be interpreted as 'S' and will associate the respective synesthetic color.

Evidence for grapheme-color synesthesia comes also from the finding that colors can be flexibly associated to graphemes, as new meanings become assigned to those graphemes. In one study synesthetes were presented with Glagolitic letters that they had never seen before, and the meaning was acquired through a short writing exercise. The Glagolitic graphemes inherited the colors of the corresponding Latin graphemes as soon as the Glagolitic graphemes acquired the new meaning.

In another study, synesthetes were prompted to form novel synesthetic associations to graphemes never seen before. Synesthetes created those associations within minutes or seconds – which was time too short to account for creation of new physical connections between color representation and grapheme representation areas in the brain, pointing again towards ideasthesia. Although the time course is consistent with postsynaptic AMPA receptor upregulation or NMDA receptor coactivation, or both, which would imply that the realtime experience is invoked at the synaptic level of analysis prior to establishment of novel wiring per se, a very intuitively appealing model.

For lexical–gustatory synesthesia evidence also points towards ideasthesia: in lexical-gustatory synesthesia, verbalisation of the stimulus is not necessary for the experience of concurrents. Instead, it is sufficient to activate the concept.

Another case of synesthesia is swimming-style synesthesia in which each swimming style is associated with a vivid experience of a color. These synesthetes do not need to perform the actual movements of a corresponding swimming style. To activate the concurrent experiences, it is sufficient to activate the concept of a swimming style (e.g., by presenting a photograph of a swimmer or simply talking about swimming).

It has been argued that grapheme-color synesthesia for geminate consonants also provides evidence for ideasthesia.

In pitch-color synesthesia, the same tone will be associated with different colors depending on how it has been named; do-sharp (i.e. di) will have colors similar to do (e.g., a reddish color) and re-flat (i.e. ra) will have color similar to that of re (e.g., yellowish), although the two classes refer to the same tone. Similar semantic associations have been found between the acoustic characteristics of vowels and the notion of size.

There are synesthetic experiences that can occur just once in a lifetime, and are thus dubbed one-shot synesthesia. Investigation of such cases has indicated that such unique experiences typically occur when a synesthete is involved in an intensive mental and emotional activity such as making important plans for one's future or reflecting on one's life. It has been thus concluded that this is also a form of ideasthesia.

== In normal perception ==
Which one would be called Bouba and which Kiki? Responses are highly consistent among people. This is an example of ideasthesia as the conceptualization of the stimulus plays an important role.

Since 2013, it has been suggested that the Bouba/Kiki phenomenon is a case of ideasthesia. Most people will agree that the star-shaped object on the left is named Kiki and the round one on the right Bouba. It has been assumed that these associations come from direct connections between visual and auditory cortices. For example, according to that hypothesis, representations of sharp inflections in the star-shaped object would be physically connected to the representations of sharp inflection in the sound of Kiki. However, Gomez et al. have shown that Kiki/Bouba associations are much richer as either word and either image is associated semantically to a number of concepts such as white or black color, feminine vs. masculine, cold vs. hot, and others. These sound–shape associations seem to be related through a large overlap between semantic networks of Kiki and star-shape on the one hand, and Bouba and round-shape on the other hand. For example, both Kiki and star-shape are clever, small, thin and nervous. This indicates that behind Kiki-Bouba effect lies a rich semantic network. In other words, our sensory experience is largely determined by the meaning that we assign to stimuli. Food description and wine tasting is another domain in which ideasthetic association between flavor and other modalities such as shape may play an important role. These semantic-like relations play a role in successful marketing; the name of a product should match its other characteristics.

== Implications for development of synesthesia ==
The concept of ideasthesia bears implications for understanding how synesthesia develops in children. Synesthetic children may associate concrete sensory-like experiences primarily to the abstract concepts that they have otherwise difficulties dealing with. Synesthesia may thus be used as a cognitive tool to cope with the abstractness of the learning materials imposed by the educational system – referred to also as a "semantic vacuum hypothesis". This hypothesis explains why the most common inducers in synesthesia are graphemes and time units – both relating to the first truly abstract ideas that a child needs to master.

== Implications for art theory ==
The concept of ideasthesia has been often discussed in relation to art, and also used to formulate a psychological theory of art. According to the theory, we consider something to be a piece of art when experiences induced by the piece are accurately balanced with semantics induced by the same piece. Thus, a piece of art makes us both strongly think and strongly experience. Moreover, the two must be perfectly balanced such that the most salient stimulus or event is both the one that evokes strongest experiences (fear, joy, ... ) and strongest cognition (recall, memory, ...) – in other words, idea is well balanced with aesthesia.

Ideasthesia theory of art may be used for psychological studies of aesthetics. It may also help explain classificatory disputes about art as its main tenet is that experience of art can only be individual, depending on person's unique knowledge, experiences and history. There could exist no general classification of art satisfactorily applicable to each and all individuals.

== Neurophysiology of ideasthesia ==
Ideasthesia is congruent with the theory of brain functioning known as practopoiesis. According to that theory, concepts are not an emergent property of highly developed, specialized neuronal networks in the brain, as is usually assumed; rather, concepts are proposed to be fundamental to the very adaptive principles by which living systems and the brain operate.

A study using magnetoencephalography has shown that color information is available in the brain signal ~200 milliseconds later when accessed via synesthesia in comparison to direct color perception, which is consistent with conceptual mediation. The study supports the idea that synesthesia is a semantic phenomenon – i.e., ideasthesia.

== See also ==
- Aesthetics – Philosophical study of beauty and art
- Charles Bonnet syndrome – Experience of hallucinations by blind people
- Classificatory disputes about art – Disputes about what should and should not be classified as art
- Consciousness – Awareness of existence
- Explanatory gap – Inability to describe conscious experiences in solely physical or structural terms
- Mind–body problem – Open question in philosophy of how abstract minds interact with physical bodies
- New mysterianism – Philosophical position on the mind-body problem
- Perception – Interpretation of sensory information
- Phantom eye syndrome
- Phantom limb – Sensation that an amputated or missing limb is attached
- Philosophical zombie – Thought experiment in philosophy
- Pictogram – Ideogram that conveys its meaning through its pictorial resemblance to a physical object
- Qualia – Instances of subjective experience
- Sentience – Ability to experience feelings and sensations
- Sound symbolism – Study in linguistics
- Synesthesia – Neurological condition involving the crossing of senses
