= The Man Who Tasted Shapes =

Book by Richard Cytowic

- Author: Richard Cytowic
- Cover artist: Hayden Cornner, "Table for One" (1994)
- Language: English
- Subject: Synesthesia, Neuroscience, Cognition
- Publisher: MIT Press
- Publication date: 2003
- Publication place: United States
- Media type: Paperback
- Pages: 275, 11 illustrations
- ISBN: 0-262-53255-7
- OCLC: 53186027

The Man Who Tasted Shapes is a book by neurologist Richard Cytowic about synesthesia.

== Summary ==
The book is divided into two parts. In the first part, Cytowic describes his chance encounter during a dinner party on February 10, 1980 with MW, the "Man Who Tasted Shapes." Cytowic describes how his host reported that "There aren't enough points on the chicken!" and how this chance comment led to Cytowic's investigations of the neurological phenomenon of synesthesia. Early chapters include background information on how the brain is organized, drawn mainly from Paul D. MacLean's Triune Brain theory. Cytowic describes MW's synesthesia, noting the consistency of his reports, that such experiences are "generic" and consistent over time. Chapters dealing with more scientific theories, data and experimentation are alternated with autobiographical and more personal chapters describing the historical details of Cytowic's investigations into synesthesia.

In order to explore the biological basis of synesthesia, Cytowic describes experiments in which he tested how MW's synesthesia was reduced by MW's daily routine of stimulants such as nicotine and caffeine and depressants such as alcohol. In more intensive investigations of the effects of different psychoactive substances, Cytowic notes that stimulants, including a dose of amphetamine, decreased the strength of MW's synesthesia, while amyl nitrite increased the strength of MW's synesthesia. For example, MW reports that mint feels like a cool glass column, but that amyl nitrite led him to feel as if he were placing his hand among many glass columns. Cytowic also summarizes work done with functional neuroimaging which showed unusually low cortical activation in MW. Based on these results, Cytowic proposes a theory in which synesthesia is a result of unusual processing in the limbic system and an overall decrease in cortical activation.

In later chapters, Cytowic reports on his efforts to make synesthesia more widely known, on the experiences of many other synesthetes who have contacted him, and how synesthesia affects their lives. Cytowic describes how an article about his work on synesthesia in the tabloid The National Enquirer, a publication which is "not known to help one's career", led to his first contacts with synesthetes beyond MW These personal accounts of synesthesia, described here in more autobiographical style, also form the basis of Cytowic's more detailed scientific book, Synesthesia: A Union of the Senses. Additionally, Cytowic discusses the links between synesthesia and memory, as first noted in Alexander Luria's book The Mind of Mnemonist about Solomon Shereshevskii, a Russian mnemonist who also experienced fivefold synesthesia.

In the second part of the book, entitled "Essays on the Primacy of Emotion", Cytowic presents a number of his reflections on what the phenomenon of synesthesia means for traditional neuroscientific and neurological practice, how anomalous findings can lead to major scientific discoveries, and the role that emotion plays in our understanding of the world around us.
