= Kingdom of Simplicity =

2009 novel by Holly Payne

Kingdom of Simplicity is a novel by American author Holly Payne published in June 2009. It is Payne's third novel.

== Plot outline ==
The novel is set among the Old Order Amish in the Lancaster, Pennsylvania region. It tells the story of an Amish boy's attempts to move past "his anger ... and his guilt, which lead him on a painful journey during his rumspringa, the period when Amish teens are allowed to experience the outside world before formally joining the Amish faith. Eli can embrace it only when he learns to forgive.

Told in the first person, the novel opens when Eli Yoder, the protagonist, steals a camera. This is a doubly significant crime, since the Amish don't use cameras or permit themselves to be photographed. This theft figures into another crime of sorts, and finally into Eli's expulsion from his non-Amish friends.

== Writing and publication ==
Payne began writing the book based on her recollections and experiences growing up among the Amish, but the Amish school-shooting tragedy in October 2006 made her reconsider the book's direction. The Amish quickly forgave the shooter, and went to comfort his family. According to Payne, "If you're Amish, you can get there much faster, just because it's part of your DNA. Our culture isn't a forgiving culture. We're a very litigious culture. It's all about getting back and an eye for an eye." Payne has stated that the entire book is really about forgiveness.

== Major characters ==
- Eli Yoder - the proatgonist. Eli is old-order Amish, and has a genetic disorder common among Amish, that of having webbed hands. Most of the novel occurs when Eli is sixteen years old, though it begins somewhat earlier.
- Leroy Fischer - a non-Amish barber who befriends Leroy, but also challenges him in several important ways.
- Emma Beiler - an Amish girl whom Eli likes, and who likes him.
- The Driver - a character initially in the background, whose identity is eventually revealed.
