= Number form =

Mental map of numbers

A number form from one of Francis Galton's (1888) subjects. Note the convolutions, and how the first 12 digits correspond to a clock face. Number forms are idiosyncratic to the person experiencing them.

A number form is a mental map of numbers, which automatically and involuntarily appears whenever someone who experiences number-forms thinks of numbers. Numbers are mapped into distinct spatial locations and the mapping may be different across individuals. Number forms were first documented and named in 1881 by Sir Francis Galton in his The Visions of Sane Persons. Later research has identified them as a type of synesthesia.

== Neural mechanisms ==
It has been suggested that number-forms are a result of cross-activation between regions of the parietal lobe that are involved in numerical cognition and angular gyrus for spatial cognition. Since the areas that process numerical and spatial representations are close to each other, this may contribute to the increased cross-activation. Synesthetes display larger P3b amplitudes for month cues compared to non-synesthetes, but similar N1 and P3b responses for arrow (← or →) and word (left or right) cues.

== Reaction time research ==
Reaction time studies have shown that number-form synesthetes are faster to say which of two numbers is larger when the numbers are arranged in a manner consistent with their number-form, suggesting that number forms are automatically evoked. This can be thought of as a spatial Stroop task, in which space is not relevant to the task, but which can hinder performance despite its irrelevance. The fact that synesthetes cannot ignore the spatial arrangement of the numbers on the screen demonstrates that numbers are automatically evoking spatial cues. The reaction times for valid cues are smaller than invalid cues (words and arrows), but in synesthetes the response time differences for months are larger than those of non-synesthetes.

== Differences with number line ==
These number forms can be distinguished from the non-conscious mental number lines by the fact that they are conscious, idiosyncratic and stable across the person's lifespan. Although this form of synesthesia has not been as intensively studied as grapheme–color synesthesia, Hubbard and colleagues have argued that similar neural mechanisms might be involved, but acting in different brain regions.

== See also ==
- Aphantasia
- Ideasthesia
- Synesthesia
