= The Brain with David Eagleman =

American documentary television series

- Genre: Science documentary
- Created by: David Eagleman
- Written by: David Eagleman
- Directed by: Julian Jones, Toby Trackman, Nick Stacey, Catherine Gale, Johanna Woolford Gibbon, Dan Clifton, Glenn Barden,
- Starring: David Eagleman
- Original language: English
- No. of episodes: 6

Production
- Producers: Justine Kershaw; Jennifer Beamish
- Running time: 56 minutes
- Production company: Blink Films

Original release
- Network: PBS (United States), BBC (United Kingdom), SBS (Australia)
- Release: October 2015 – present

The Brain with David Eagleman is a PBS documentary series created and presented by neuroscientist Dr. David Eagleman. Eagleman explores the wonders of the human brain with the goal of revealing why we feel and think the things we do. The series debuted on PBS in 2015, followed by airings on the BBC in the United Kingdom and the SBS in Australia.

== Episode list ==
The series consists of six 1-hour episodes:

Episode	Title
01	What Is Reality?
02	What Makes Me Me?
03	Who's in Control?
04	How Do I Decide?
05	Why Do I Need You?
06	Who Will We Be?

== Book ==
Eagleman's book to accompany the series, The Brain: The Story of You, was co-published by Pantheon Books (US) and Canongate Books (UK).

== Reception ==
The series and accompanying book garnered wide critical acclaim. The New York Times listed it as one of the best television shows of 2015. Forbes magazine wrote that "in the fine tradition of Carl Sagan, Eagleman shows that science is captivating without hyped embellishment, and, if you pay attention, you'll find yourself immersed in it". The scientific journal Nature described the series as "an ideal introduction to how biology generates the mind... structured around crucial and wide-ranging questions, saturated with personal and social relevance. And Eagleman's answers are consistently clear, engaging and thought-provoking." Actor Hugh Laurie described the series as one of the influences for his television series Chance. Hugh Laurie also tweeted his advice about the show: "I recommend a facial truss, to prevent your chin hitting the floor hard and often." Texas Monthly Magazine suggested that Eagleman is "the Carl Sagan of neuroscience".
