= Livewired =

2020 book by David Eagleman

Livewired: The Inside Story of the Ever-Changing Brain
- Cover of the book Livewired by David Eagleman
- Author: David Eagleman
- Language: English
- Subject: Neuroscience
- Genre: Science
- Published: 25 August 2020, Pantheon (US), Canongate (UK)
- Media type: Hardcover, Paperback, Audio book, E-Book
- ISBN: 030790749X; 978-0307907493

Livewired: The Inside Story of the Ever-Changing Brain is a non-fiction book by David Eagleman, a neuroscientist at Stanford University. The book explores and extends the phenomenon of brain plasticity, with the term livewired proposed as a term to supersede plastic.

As of late 2020, the book was nominated for the Pulitzer Prize. A Kirkus review described the book as "outstanding popular science," while New Scientist magazine wrote that "Eagleman brings the subject to life in a way I haven’t seen other writers achieve before." Harvard Business Review wrote that Livewired "gets the science right and makes it accessible... completely upending our basic sense of what the brain is in the process." The Wall Street Journal wrote that "since the passing of Isaac Asimov, we haven't had a working scientist like Eagleman, who engages his ideas in such a variety of modes. Livewired reads wonderfully, like what a book would be if it were written by Oliver Sacks and William Gibson, sitting on Carl Sagan's front lawn.”
