= Holly Payne =

American author and screenwriter

Holly Lynn Payne is an American author and screenwriter. She has written four novels: The Virgin's Knot, The Sound of Blue, The Kingdom of Simplicity, and Damascena.

== Early life and education ==
Payne was born and grew up near Lancaster, Pennsylvania, and attended the University of Richmond and then earned an MFA from the University of Southern California. She lives near San Francisco with her daughter.

== Career ==
Payne has served on the faculty of the Academy of Art University, California College of the Arts and Stanford University. She also served on the board of Litquake, a San Francisco-area literary organization and festival.

In 2002 Payne wrote her first book, The Virgin's Knot, a novel about a crippled and unmarried Turkish woman who weaves rugs in a small village. Although not all reviews were positive, The Virgin's Knot won the Contra Costa Times Book Club Pick. It was also a Barnes & Noble Discover Great New Writers Selection 2002, and a Border's Original Voices Book 2002.

Payne's next novel, The Sound of Blue, was published in 2004. Several years later, in response to an earlier injury during an encounter with a drunk driver while mountain biking, she wrote The Kingdom of Simplicity The book has won several awards, and has been translated and published in the US, the Netherlands, Taiwan, and China. The Kingdom of Simplicity won the Benjamin Franklin award for independent publishers.

Payne's fourth book, Damascene: A Tale of Roses and Rumi, is a work of historical fiction about the life of a thirteenth-century Persian poet, and an orphan girl. It also draws on the story of the Damask rose, a cultivar renowned for its fine fragrance.

Payne founded Booxby in late 2014, with the stated mission "to perpetuate a love of reading—by helping people find the right book at the right time."

== Books ==
- The Virgin's Knot, 2003.
- The Sound of Blue, 2004.
- The Kingdom of Simplicity, 2010
- Damascena A Tale of Roses and Rumi, 2014
