= David Eagleman =

American scientist and author (born 1971)

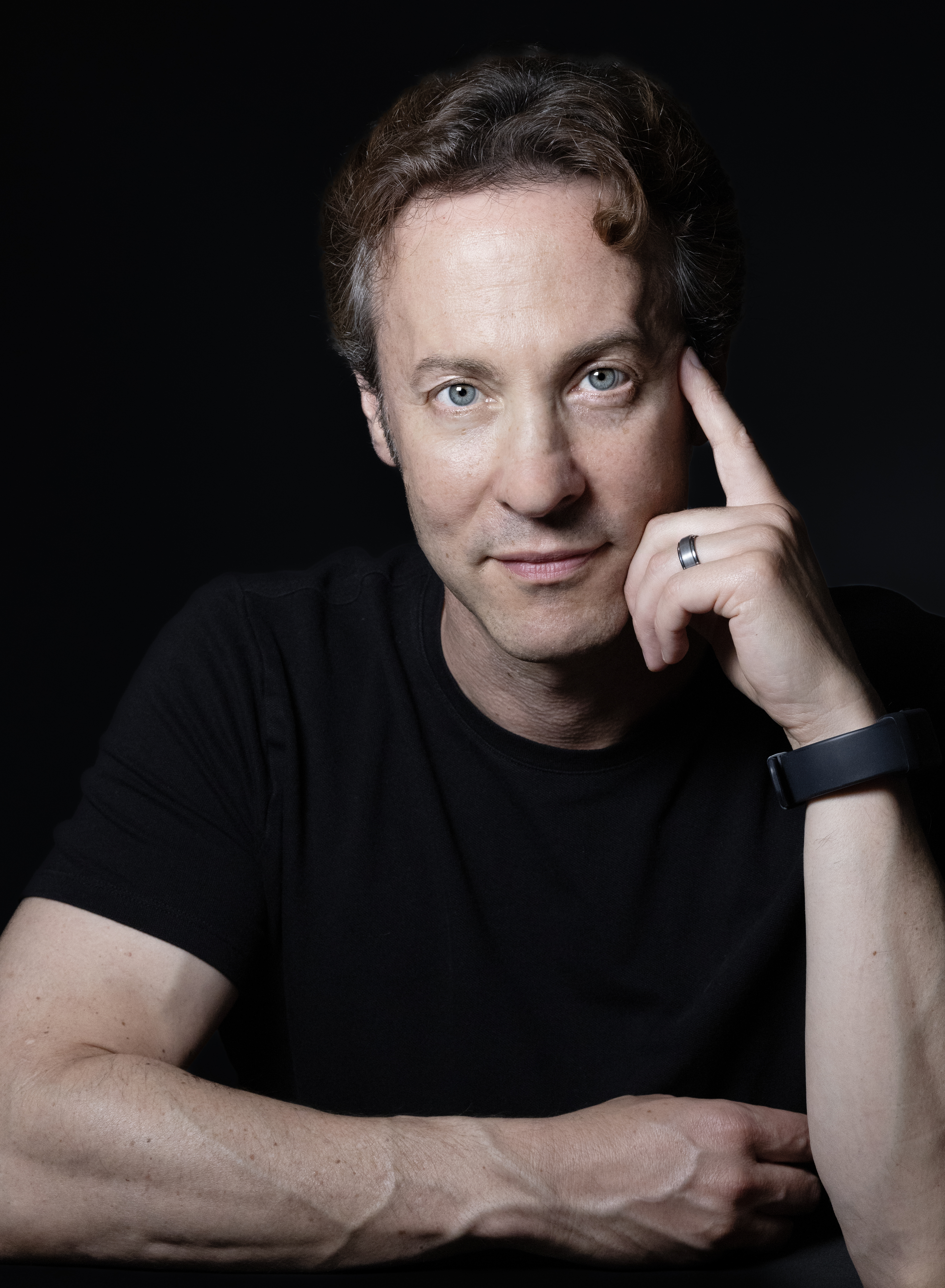
- Eagleman in 2024
- Born: April 25, 1971 (age 55); Albuquerque, New Mexico, US
- Education: Rice University; Baylor College of Medicine; Salk Institute
- Known for: Time perception; brain plasticity; synesthesia; neurolaw; PBS television series: The Brain with David Eagleman; Books: Sum: Forty Tales from the Afterlives; Incognito; The Brain: The Story of You; The Runaway Species; Livewired; Podcast: Inner Cosmos with David Eagleman
- Awards: Guggenheim Fellowship, Science Educator of the Year from Society for Neuroscience, Claude Shannon Luminary Award from Bell Labs
- Scientific career
- Fields: Neuroscience
- Workplaces: Stanford University
- Doctoral advisor: Read Montague
- Website: eagleman.com eagleman.sites.stanford.edu

David Eagleman (born April 25, 1971) is an American neuroscientist, bestselling author, and science communicator. He teaches neuroscience at Stanford University and has founded several neurotech startups. He directs the non-profit Center for Science and Law, which seeks to align the legal system with modern neuroscience. He is known for his work on brain plasticity, time perception, synesthesia, and neurolaw.

He is a Guggenheim Fellow and a New York Times-bestselling author published in 32 languages. He is the writer and presenter of the international television series The Brain with David Eagleman and the host of the podcast Inner Cosmos with David Eagleman. His podcast has been ranked as the number-one science podcast on Apple several times and in 2024 was nominated for the best science podcast of the year at the iHeart Podcast Awards at SXSW.

== Biography ==
Eagleman was born on April 25, 1971, in New Mexico to a physician father and a biology teacher mother. An early experience of falling from a roof raised his interest in understanding the neural basis of time perception. He attended the Albuquerque Academy for high school. As an undergraduate at Rice University, he majored in British and American literature and in his junior year studied abroad at Oxford University. He earned his PhD in Neuroscience at Baylor College of Medicine in 1998, followed by a postdoctoral fellowship at the Salk Institute.

Eagleman is an adjunct professor at Stanford University, after directing a neuroscience research laboratory for 10 years at Baylor College of Medicine. He is a Guggenheim Fellow and serves as a member of the board of directors of the Long Now Foundation. Italy's Style fashion magazine named Eagleman one of the "Brainiest, Brightest Idea Guys" and featured him on the cover. He was awarded the Science Educator Award by the Society for Neuroscience. He has spun off several companies from his research, including BrainCheck, which helps medical professionals assess and diagnose cognitive impairment and dementia, and Neosensory, which used sound-to-touch sensory substitution to feed data streams into the brain, as described in his TED talk.

Eagleman has been profiled in magazines such as the New Yorker, and has been on television programs such as The Colbert Report. Stewart Brand wrote that "David Eagleman may be the best combination of scientist and fiction-writer alive". In 2025 he was given the Woz Innovation Award from Steve Wozniak.

As opposed to committing to strict atheism or to a particular religious position, Eagleman refers to himself as a possibilian, which distinguishes itself from atheism and agnosticism by studying the structure of the possibility space.

== Scientific specializations ==
=== Sensory substitution ===
Sensory substitution refers to feeding information into the brain via unusual sensory channels, a central topic in Eagleman's book Livewired. In a TED talk, Eagleman unveiled a method for using sound-to-touch sensory substitution to feed data streams into the brain. In 2015, together with Dr. Scott Novich, PhD, he co-founded the company Neosensory, headquartered in Palo Alto, California, of which he was the CEO. As of 2023, Neosensory had raised over 20 million dollars in venture funding. In 2015, the company presented the Versatile Extra-Sensory Transducer (VEST) wearable device that "translates" speech and other audio signals into series of vibration, that allows deaf people to "feel" sounds on their body. In 2019, Neosensory presented the Buzz wristband, a sensory substitution device that transfers sound into dynamic vibration patterns, aimed for deaf or hard-of-hearing individuals. In 2022, the company released the Neosensory Clarify for high-frequency hearing loss; the wristband used machine learning to detect high-frequency phonemes in real time and indicate their presence to the user through vibrations. After a decade, Neosensory sold its technology to a larger company and ceased operations

=== Dreams ===
In Eagleman and Vaughn's Defensive Activation Theory, animals dream to protect the brain’s visual cortex from being encroached upon by other senses during the long hours of nightly darkness. Because the cortex is highly plastic, especially in the young, unused regions are vulnerable to invasion from neighboring functions (as seen, for example, when the visual cortex of blind individuals gets repurposed for touch or hearing). To prevent this kind of takeover, Eagleman and Vaughn proposed that the brain periodically generates bursts of neural activity (as seen during REM sleep) that stimulate the primary visual cortex, producing the imagery we experience as dreams. In this view, dreams are essentially a 'screensaver' to preserve the territory of the visual cortex. Evidence for the hypothesis includes the correlation across species between dependence on vision and amount of REM sleep, and the observation that people who lose their sight later in life begin to dream with other senses, consistent with cortical repurposing.

=== Time perception ===
Eagleman's scientific work combines psychophysical, behavioral, and computational approaches to address the relationship between the timing of perception and the timing of neural signals. Areas for which he is known include temporal encoding, time warping, manipulations of the perception of causality, and time perception in high-adrenaline situations. In one experiment, he dropped himself and other volunteers from a 150-foot tower to measure time perception as they fell. He writes that his long-range goal is "to understand how neural signals processed by different brain regions come together for a temporally unified picture of the world".

=== Synesthesia ===
Synesthesia is an unusual perceptual condition in which stimulation to one sense triggers an involuntary sensation in other senses. Eagleman is the developer of The Synesthesia Battery, a free online test by which people can determine whether they are synesthetic. By this technique he has tested and analyzed thousands of synesthetes, and has written a book on synesthesia with Richard Cytowic, entitled Wednesday is Indigo Blue: Discovering the Brain of Synesthesia. Eagleman has proposed that sensory processing disorder, a common characteristic of autism, may be a form of synesthesia.

=== Visual illusions ===
Eagleman has published extensively on what visual illusions tell us about neurobiology, concentrating especially on the flash lag illusion, luminance illusions, the wagon wheel effect, and geometric illusions.

=== Neuroscience and the law ===
Neurolaw is an emerging field that determines how modern brain science should affect the way we make laws, punish criminals, and invent new methods for rehabilitation. Eagleman is the founder and director of the Center for Science and Law.

=== Memory ===
Eagleman's BrainCheck tests cognitive abilities, including memory. In 2025 Eagleman and a student launched Memory Plus, leveraging AI to generate trivia cards that are extremely specific to a person's year of birth and where they grew up, with the goal of triggering specific memories to combat dementia. The Eagleman Laboratory operated a website from 2013 to 2017 called mylifememory.info about hyperthymesia, which invited users to take "The Extraordinary Memory Test" for research purposes. The lab was trying to find individuals with the condition so they could "further elucidate the causes and nature of hyperthymesia."

== Podcast ==
Eagleman hosts the weekly monologue podcast Inner Cosmos, which has ranked as the number-one science podcast in America on Apple podcasts several times and was nominated for the best science podcast of the year at the 2024 iHeart Podcast Awards at SXSW.

== Television ==
Eagleman is a producer with Cognito Film, which he launched with co-producers Matt Tauber and Adam Fratto to make film and television related to science.

Eagleman wrote and hosted The Brain with David Eagleman, an international television documentary series for which he was the writer, host, and executive producer The series debuted on PBS in America in 2015, followed by the BBC in the United Kingdom and the SBS in Australia before worldwide distribution. The New York Times listed it as one of the best television shows of the year. In 2016, the series was nominated for an Emmy Award.

He also made a Netflix documentary, The Creative Brain, based on his book The Runaway Species with Anthony Brandt. In that documentary, he interviews creators such as Tim Robbins, Michael Chabon, Grimes, Dan Weiss, Kelis, Robert Glasper, Nathan Myhrvold, Michelle Khine, Nick Cave, Bjarke Ingels, and others.

Eagleman served as a scientific advisor for the HBO television series Westworld. He previously served as the science advisor for the TNT television drama, Perception, starring Eric McCormack as a schizophrenic neuropsychiatrist. In that role, Eagleman wrote one of the episodes, "Eternity".

== Books ==
=== Wednesday Is Indigo Blue: Discovering the Brain of Synesthesia ===
Eagleman's 2009 book on synesthesia, co-authored with neurologist Richard E. Cytowic, compiles contemporary understanding and research about this perceptual condition. The afterword for the book was written by Dmitri Nabokov, the son of Vladimir Nabokov, a synesthete. The book won the Montaigne Medal for "books that illuminate, progress, or redirect thought".

=== Sum ===
Eagleman's 2009 work of literary fiction, Sum: Forty Tales from the Afterlives, is an international bestseller published in 32 languages. The Observer wrote that "Sum has the unaccountable, jaw-dropping quality of genius"; The Wall Street Journal called Sum "inventive and imaginative"; and the Los Angeles Times hailed it as "teeming, writhing with imagination". In The New York Times Book Review, Alexander McCall Smith described Sum as a "delightful, thought-provoking little collection belonging to that category of strange, unclassifiable books that will haunt the reader long after the last page has been turned. It is full of tangential insights into the human condition and poetic thought experiments ... It is also full of touching moments and glorious wit of the sort one only hopes will be in copious supply on the other side." Sum was chosen by Time magazine for their Summer Reading list and selected as Book of the Week by both The Guardian and The Week. In September 2009, Sum was ranked by Amazon as the #2 bestselling book in the United Kingdom.

=== The Safety Net (previously titled Why the Net Matters) ===
In 2020, Eagleman published The Safety Net: Surviving Pandemics and Other Disasters, an updated and retitled version of a book he had published in 2010: Why the Net Matters. In it, he argues that the advent of the internet mitigates some of the traditional existential threats to civilizations. In keeping with the book's theme of the dematerialization of physical goods, he chose to publish the manuscript as an app for the iPad rather than a physical book. The New York Times Magazine described Why the Net Matters as a "superbook", referring to "books with so much functionality that they're sold as apps". Stewart Brand described it as a "breakthrough work". The project was longlisted for the 2011 Publishing Innovation Award by Digital Book World.

=== Incognito: The Secret Lives of the Brain ===
Eagleman's 2011 science book Incognito: The Secret Lives of the Brain was a New York Times bestseller and was named a Best Book of the Year by Amazon, The Boston Globe, and Houston Chronicle. The book was reviewed as "appealing and persuasive" by The Wall Street Journal and "a shining example of lucid and easy-to-grasp science writing" by The Independent. The book explores the brain as being a "team of rivals", with different parts constantly "fighting it out" among each other.

=== The Brain: The Story of You ===
In 2015, The Brain came out as a companion book to the television series The Brain with David Eagleman.

=== Brain and Behavior: A Cognitive Neuroscience Perspective ===
In 2016, Eagleman co-authored a textbook on cognitive neuroscience with Jonathan Downar, titled Brain and Behavior: A Cognitive Neuroscience Perspective, published by Oxford University Press.

=== The Runaway Species ===
In 2017, Eagleman and co-author Anthony Brandt wrote The Runaway Species, an examination of human creativity. The book was described by Nature as "A lively exploration of the software our brains run in search of the mother lode of invention... It sweeps the reader through examples from engineering, science, product design, music and the visual arts to trace the roots of creative thinking." The Wall Street Journal wrote that "the authors look at art and science together to examine how innovations — from Picasso's initially offensive paintings to Steve Jobs's startling iPhone — build on what already exists ... This manifesto of sorts shows how both disciplines foster creativity."

=== Livewired: The Inside Story of the Ever-Changing Brain ===
In 2020, Eagleman published Livewired: The Inside Story of the Ever-Changing Brain, a nonfiction book about neuroplasticity. As of late 2020, it has been nominated for the Pulitzer Prize. A Kirkus review described it as "outstanding popular science", while New Scientist magazine wrote that "Eagleman brings the subject to life in a way I haven't seen other writers achieve before." Harvard Business Review wrote that Livewired "gets the science right and makes it accessible ... completely upending our basic sense of what the brain is in the process." The Wall Street Journal wrote that "since the passing of Isaac Asimov, we haven't had a working scientist like Eagleman, who engages his ideas in such a variety of modes. Livewired reads wonderfully, like what a book would be if it were written by Oliver Sacks and William Gibson, sitting on Carl Sagan's front lawn."

== Personal life ==
Eagleman is married to Sarah Eagleman, a fellow neuroscientist. They have two children. Eagleman does not drink alcohol.

== Works ==
- Wednesday Is Indigo Blue: Discovering the Brain of Synesthesia, co-authored with Richard Cytowic, MIT Press, 2009
- Sum: Forty Tales from the Afterlives, Pantheon, 2009 (Fiction)
- The Safety Net: Surviving Pandemics and Other Disasters, Canongate, 2020 (originally published as Why the Net Matters, Canongate, 2010)
- Incognito: The Secret Lives of the Brain, Pantheon, 2011
- The Brain with David Eagleman, a PBS television series, 2015
- The Brain: The Story of You, Canongate, 2015
- Brain and Behavior: A Cognitive Neuroscience Perspective, co-authored with Jonathan Downar, Oxford University Press, 2016
- The Runaway Species, co-authored with Anthony Brandt, Catapult, 2017
- Livewired: The Inside Story of the Ever-Changing Brain, Penguin Random House, 2020
