= T. S. Wiley =

Teresa S. Wiley is the author of Lights Out: Sleep, Sugar and Survival, and Sex, Lies and Menopause. She writes about women's health, particularly sleep and hormonal issues, hormone replacement therapy and bioidentical hormone replacement therapy. Wiley has developed her own version of BHRT known as the Wiley Protocol, though she has been strongly criticized for lacking the relevant credentials and potentially putting women at risk with an unproven, untested intervention that uses possibly dangerously high doses of hormones.

== Writings and beliefs ==
Wiley's main thesis in Lights Out is that light is a physiological trigger that controls dopamine and hormones like cortisol. Wiley posits that with the extension of the natural day through artificial lighting, rest at the hormonal level is rarely adequate for optimum biological needs of the body. In her view, this results in both fatigue and unnatural appetite, which leads to weight gain, exhaustion and disease. Wiley theorizes that the body's responses are cyclical, reflecting the seasons of the year, and that the body's needs vary seasonally. According to Wiley, during the winter months the body needs more sleep, and carbohydrates should be restricted as they would have been naturally during hunter-gatherer times.

Wiley is listed as co-author of three scientific journal articles along with biochemist Bent Formby between 1998 and 2001.

=== The Wiley Protocol ===
Wiley wrote a second book, Sex, Lies and Menopause, in which she claims that hormone imbalances cause many age-related diseases, and these imbalances are caused by humans straying from "natural" rhythms of light, seasonal eating and child birth. Wiley claims that mimicking the levels and cycles of estrogen and progesterone found in a 20-year-old woman will prevent or treat age-related diseases. Subsequent to the book's publication, this hormone regimen became known as the "Wiley protocol" and Wiley created a pharmaceutical compounding program that pharmacists could contract into, stipulating compounding methods, materials, testing, packaging and recommended pricing in exchange for Wiley's company providing the packaging materials bearing the Wiley protocol's trademark.

Former actress Suzanne Somers advocates the Wiley Protocol in her book Ageless: The Naked Truth About Bioidentical Hormones.

== Controversy ==
Wiley has been criticized for promoting her version of BHRT without proper qualifications or scientific evidence. On October 11, 2006, Erika Schwartz, Diana Schwarzbein, and five other MDs who have worked with BHRT during their careers issued a public letter to Suzanne Somers and her publisher, Crown, criticizing Somers' endorsement of Wiley's protocol. In the letter they alleged that the Wiley Protocol is "scientifically unproven and dangerous" and that Wiley has no medical or clinical qualifications; other criticisms of the protocol itself have stated that the levels of hormone are dangerously high. Wiley has claimed on her website and in speaking engagements that she earned a B.A. in anthropology from Webster University in 1975. On November 27, 2006, Newsweek reported that Webster has no record of this degree. Wiley's bio page was then changed to "Pending B.A. in Anthropology, Webster University, 1975" and then again to "Attended the B.A. Program in Anthropology, Webster University, 1970-1975". ABC News reported on February 16, 2007, that, according to Webster, she received only a blank diploma.

== Senate testimony ==
On April 19, 2007, Wiley appeared as a witness before the Senate Special Committee on Aging to give testimony at a hearing in which the safety and oversight of BHRT and compounding pharmacy were discussed.
