= Wiley protocol =

Controversial hormone replacement therapy

The Wiley Protocol is a form of bioidentical hormone replacement therapy (BHRT) devised and advocated by author T. S. Wiley. The protocol claims to relieve the symptoms of menopause but is also promoted as increasing overall health through the recreation of a pre-menopausal woman's monthly hormonal cycle using rhythmic doses of hormones standardized to a uniform purity. Wiley claims the protocol is a step beyond the symptomatic treatment of conventional hormone replacement therapy.

The protocol has been criticized by members of the medical community for the dosages of the hormones used, side effects of the treatment, potential physiologic effects, Wiley's lack of medical or clinical qualifications to design the protocol, lack of empirical evidence demonstrating it as safe or effective, ethical problems with the clinical trial that is being run to test it and potential financial conflicts of interest regarding financial incentives.

== Specific dosing ==
The Wiley Protocol uses bioidentical hormones, specifically estradiol and progesterone. Hormones are applied transdermally, using an oil-based skin cream for topical administration. Doses of the hormones vary throughout a 28-day cycle that is designed to mimic the hormone levels and changes of a young woman who experiences regular menstruation, with each hormone cycling and peaking at separate times throughout the period. The protocol is promoted as differing from conventional hormone replacement therapy in several ways:

- The use of plant-derived hormones that are identical to endogenous hormones found in the body, rather than the synthetic derivatives of conventional hormone replacement therapy such as premarin
- A dose that varies over a 28-day cycle rather than remaining static
- Topical rather than oral administration

The protocol also includes a follow-up program to monitor the serum of the bioidentical hormones.

Wiley has stated that in her opinion, the most important aspect of the protocol is the specific schedule and levels of the hormone doses rather than their bioidentical nature.

A patent was granted for the protocol in 2011 for the specific blend of hormones and dosing method.

== Criticism ==
Concerns have been raised that serum levels may not be an acceptable marker for transdermally administered hormones, that some women have experienced significant side effects while following the protocol and have stopped using it, and that the dosages used are too high and not physiologic.

T. S. Wiley and Suzanne Somers have been criticized by some physicians for their advocacy of the Wiley Protocol. A group of seven doctors issued a public letter to Somers and her publisher, Crown, in which they state that the protocol is "scientifically unproven and dangerous" and cite Wiley's lack of medical and clinical qualifications. The Wiley Protocol has been criticized as unethical due to the start of a Phase II clinical trial with no Phase I, a lack of approval by an institutional review board, a lack of an experienced scientific investigator leading the trial, no inclusion or exclusion criteria and no evidence that the study population has been told that the research has not passed an ethical review, as well as concerns over conflicts of interest regarding financial incentives.
