= Alan Hamel's Comedy Bag =

Canadian television series

Alan Hamel's Comedy Bag is a Canadian variety-comedy television series which aired on CBC Television for one programming season from 23 September 1972 to 9 June 1973.

The Montreal-produced half-hour program aired on Saturdays and featured American guest appearances. Alan Hamel, the titular series host, was previously a regular on the 1960s Canadian series Razzle Dazzle and a game show host on American television in 1969.
