= The Forest Rangers (TV series) =

Canadian television series

- Also known as: Les Cadets de la forêt
- Genre: Children's adventure
- Written by: Lindsay Galloway (most episodes)
- Starring: Graydon Gould; Rex Hagon; Michael Zenon; Gordon Pinsent
- Country of origin: Canada
- Original language: English
- No. of seasons: 3
- No. of episodes: 104

Production
- Executive producer: Maxine Samuels
- Running time: 30 minutes
- Production companies: A.S.P. Productions Ltd. Canadian Broadcasting Corporation; Incorporated Television Company

Original release
- Network: CBC Television
- Release: December 1963 – 1965

The Forest Rangers (in French, Les Cadets de la forêt) is a Canadian television series that ran from 1963 to 1965. It was a co-production between CBC Television and ITC Entertainment and was Canada's first television show produced in colour. Executive producer Maxine Samuels founded the show.

The series ran for three seasons, a total of 104 30-minute colour episodes (although Canadian and UK audiences would not get to see them in colour until long after the series ended). Early episodes of the series were broadcast in serialized form as part of a CBC children's series entitled Razzle Dazzle, hosted by Alan Hamel and Michelle Finney.

The series follows a group of child Junior Forest Rangers who lived in an abandoned Hudson's Bay Company fort in Ontario, and who kept watch on the forest. Most plots dealt with physical threats such as forest fires and floods, but the junior rangers also rescued people or caught wrongdoers with the help of a Royal Canadian Mounted Police officer, an adult uniformed Ranger, and a local First Nations guide. Educational elements were included in some episodes.

This was the first appearance in a major series by Gordon Pinsent. He left the series in 1965 to star in Quentin Durgens, M.P.. In 1966 the series was adapted into a comic strip by British comics artist John Gillatt, which appeared in the British comic magazine Tiger.

The show was also run in syndication in the United States from 1965 to 1966.

In June 2004, there was a reunion for ex-cast and fans just south of Kleinburg, where the show was originally filmed. Six of the ex-junior rangers appeared and Peter Tully flew in from his home in Ireland. Another reunion occurred 15 June 2013 at the actual studios where the show was filmed. This time nine junior rangers and Gordon Pinsent were in attendance.

The show's first season was released on DVD by Imavision in early 2007.

== Main cast ==
Season 1 Boxset released on DVD.

- Graydon Gould as Chief Ranger George Keeley
- Rex Hagon as Junior Ranger Peter Keeley
- Michael Zenon as Joe Two Rivers
- Gordon Pinsent as Sergeant Scott
- Rolland Bédard as Uncle Raoul La Roche
- Ralph Endersby as Junior Ranger Chub Stanley
- Peter Tully as Junior Ranger Mike Forbes
- Susan Conway as Junior Ranger Kathy
- Syme Jago as Junior Ranger Gaby La Roche
- Joe Austin as MacLeod
- Eric Clavering as Shingwauk
- Tom Harvey as Deputy Ranger Brody
- Eric Cryderman as Ranger Matt Craig
- Ronald Cohoon as Junior Ranger Zeke
- George Allan as Junior Ranger Ted
- Mathew Ferguson as Junior Ranger Danny Bailey
- Barbara Hamilton as Aggie Apple
- Gerard Parkes as Charlie Appleby/Michael Flynn
- Ray Bellew as Rocky Webb
- Trudy Young as Wilhelmina

== Episode list ==
There are two episode order lists. This episode list is in sequence by filming date order. The other list is in sequence by episode title order. Some episodes were given different titles on film to those given in the TV guides of different countries.

Season 1	Season 2	Season 3
1. "Foster Boy"; 2. "The Prospector"; 3. "Spike"; 4. "Beaver"; 5. "The Horse Doctor"; 6. "The Bear Trap"; 7. "The Bird Watchers"; 8. "Indian Joe's Story"; 9. "The Chase"; 10. "High Graders"; 11. "The Rattlesnake"; 12. "The Dog"; 13. "Dog Catcher"; 14. "Brannigan's Daughter"; 15. "Timmy"; 16. "The Liar"; 17. "The Rescue"; 18. "Uncle Raoul and the Bear"; 19. "The Bear Story"; 20. "The Horse"; 21. "The Proof"; 22. "The Secret Drawer"; 23. "The Souvenir"; 24. "The Rolling Stones"; 25. "The Balloon"; 26. "The Poacher"; 27. "The Loner"; 28. "The Pitfall"; 29. "Keeley's Cousin"; 30. "Kidnapped"; 31. "Chub's Story"; 32. "The Hero"; 33. "The Wolverine"; 34. "Survival"; 35. "The Colonel"; 36. "The Deputy"; 37. "Dentist's Dilemma"; 38. "A Christmas Story"; 39. "Odd Numbers"; 40. "The Game Reserve"	1. "The Deal"; 2. "Hidden Gold"; 3. "The Strike"; 4. "Ghost at Hoot Owl Lake"; 5. "Let There be Rain"; 6. "Aggie"; 7. "The Wendigo"; 8. "Kitten in the Bush"; 9. "A Stranger To Himself"; 10. "Wild Boy"; 11. "Surprise Party"; 12. "Lennie"; 13. "Kathy and the Leprechaun"; 14. "The Haunted Island"; 15. "Lost"; 16. "Bronco Smith"; 17. "The Bush Pilot"; 18. "Interchangeable Parts"; 19. "Uncle Raoul's Moose"; 20. "His Majesty"; 21. "The Reluctant Prize Fighter"; 22. "Little Big Shot"; 23. "Wild Man of the Woods"; 24. "The River"; 25. "The Adventurer"; 26. "The Bear Rug"; 27. "The Shooting Match"; 28. "The Haunted House"; 29. "Ride with a Stranger"; 30. "Buck Fever"; 31. "Gold Nuggets"	1. "Santa MacLeod"; 2. "The Choice"; 3. "The Wolf"; 4. "The Wolf Spirit"; 5. "Hole in the Ice"; 6. "The Gunshot"; 7. "The Escape"; 8. "Deadly Friend"; 9. "Not in the Book"; 10. "The Dream"; 11. "The Avenger"; 12. "The White Hunter"; 13. "The Great Hypnotist"; 14. "The Man from Nowhere"; 15. "Deadline"; 16. "Shipment X"; 17. "Jimmy Twenty"; 18. "Indian River A-Go-Go"; 19. "Poison Lake"; 20. "Willie and Starlight"; 21. "Unjust World"; 22. "The Mystery Dog"; 23. "The Bulldozer"; 24. "The Albino Beaver"; 25. "Uncle Raoul and the Three Bears"; 26. "Macleod and the Talking Bear"; 27. "Death Dance"; 28. "The Invaders"; 29. "The World's Strongest Man"; 30. "Joe's Revenge"; 31. "Raoul and the Thunderbolt"; 32. "The Lost Tribe"; 33. "The Ojibway Beat"

== Filming locations ==
- Cinespace Film Studios, Kleinburg, Ontario – the main studio lot
- Lake Muskoka – winter lake scenes from season 3
- Widdifield Fire Tower in North Bay, Ontario – fire tower scenes from season 3
- Trout Mills, Ontario – winter lake plane landing from season 1
- Mono Mills, Ontario – an old mill used in season 1
- Dufferin County, Ontario - Brannigan's Farm used in season 1
- Dorset Fire Tower in Dorset, Ontario – opening credits scene
- Mary Lake in King City, Ontario – summer lake scenes from season 1
- Draper Fire Tower in Bracebridge, Ontario – fire tower scenes from season 1
- Whitney, Ontario – river rapids scenes from season 2
- Tottenham, Ontario – a railway scene from season 1
- King Creek, Ontario in King Township, Ontario – Dog Catcher chase scenes
- Orangeville, Ontario – the rural airport where Charlie Appleby lands his plane from season 2
- Dickie Lake near Baysville, Ontario – summer lake fly-over scene from season 1
- Echo Lake near Baysville, Ontario – summer lake fly-over scene from season 2
