= Chromesthesia =

Sound to color synesthesia

A keyboard depicting note-color associations. The colors are experienced with the sounding of the note, and are not necessarily localized to piano keys.

Chromesthesia or sound-to-color synesthesia is a type of synesthesia in which sound involuntarily evokes an experience of color, shape, and movement. Individuals with sound-color synesthesia are consciously aware of their synesthetic color associations/perceptions in daily life. Synesthetes that perceive color while listening to music experience the colors in addition to the normal auditory sensations. The synesthetic color experience supplements, but does not obscure real, modality-specific perceptions. As with other forms of synesthesia, individuals with sound-color synesthesia perceive it spontaneously, without effort, and as their normal realm of experience. Chromesthesia can be induced by different auditory experiences, such as music, phonemes, speech, and/or everyday sounds.

== Individual variance ==
The color associations, that is, which color is associated to which sound, tone, pitch, or timbre is highly idiosyncratic, but in most cases, consistent over time. Individuals with synesthesia have unique color pairings. However, studies to date have reported that synesthetes and non-synesthetes alike associate high pitched sounds with lighter or brighter colors and low pitched sounds with darker colors, indicating that a common mechanism may underlie those associations in non-synesthetes. There are forms of pseudo-chromesthesia that may be explained by associations synesthetes have made and forgotten from childhood.

As with other types of synesthesia, sound-color synesthesia can be divided into groups based on the way the colors are experienced. Those that 'see' or perceive the color in external space are called projectors, and those that perceive the color in the mind's eye are often called associators, but these terms can be misleading to understanding the nature of the experience. For most synesthetes, the condition is not wholly sensory/perceptual.

For some individuals, chromesthesia is only triggered by speech sounds, while others' chromesthesia can be triggered by any auditory stimuli. In a study investigating variability within categories of synesthesia, 40% of subjects with chromesthesia for spoken words reported that voice pitch, accent, and prosody influenced the synesthetic color, whereas few subjects reported that volume or speed of talking had any influence. Within these subjects, many reported that the speaker's emotional inflection could influence the synesthetic color, but only two reported that their own mood had such influence. Of participants categorized as having synesthesia for music in this study, 75% reported concurrents exclusively when listening to notes being played. When asked whether the experience of the concurrent could be voluntarily controlled, only 33% of participants indicated an ability to smother, ignore, or willfully evoke their concurrents without great effort. Attention to the inducing stimulus was reported as influential in 59% of participants. Other contributing factors included concentration level, fatigue, sleep habits, fever, emotions, and substances, such as caffeine or alcohol.

Sound-color synesthesia is far more common than color-sound synesthesia, although there are reported cases where sounds and colors activate bidirectionally. One individual sees colors when she hears sounds and also hears sounds when she sees colors. This type of synesthesia interferes greatly with daily life. This individual's associations were highly consistent over time, but the associations were not necessarily the same in either direction. Another individual who had absolute pitch, as well as chromesthesia, claimed that her absolute pitch was less stable than her chromesthesia.

There may be an effect of semantic mediation in some individuals with sound-color synesthesia. One subject self-triggered notes on a synthesizer and noted the color associations. When the synthesizer was transposed without her knowledge, she reported identical color associations to the notes that she believed she was hearing, rather than the absolute pitch of the tones.

== History ==
The terms synesthesia and chromesthesia have developed and evolved considerably throughout history. The first documented synesthete was Georg Tobias Ludwig Sachs in 1812. Although he did not give a specific name to his experience, in a medical dissertation regarding his albinism (written in Latin), he mentioned obscure ideas and described how colored ideas appeared to him. Even earlier than Sachs, however, Johann Gottfried Herder discussed similar ideas in his Treatise on the Origin of Language in 1772. He talked about how people, "through a sudden onset immediately associate with this sound that color".

The first concrete term associated with chromesthesia was given by Charles-Auguste-Édouard Cornaz in an eye disease dissertation in 1848. Color blindness was a common condition known as chromatodysopsia and, since Cornaz saw chromesthesia as the opposite, he named it hyperchromatopsia or perception of too many colors.

In 1881, Eugen Bleuler and Karl Bernhard Lehmann were the first to establish six different types of what they called secondary sensations or secondary imaginations. The first, which was the most common, was sound photisms. They described it as "light, color, and form sensations which are elicited through hearing". Their book was reviewed by an Austrian newspaper, where the term colored hearing, still commonly used today to describe chromesthesia, first appeared.

Research on synesthesia in the United States began in 1892. And, since 1895, the term finally expanded from pure sound-to-color experiences (chromesthesia) to a wide range of phenomena, including grapheme-color synesthesia, mirror-touch synesthesia, and lexical-gustatory synesthesia. The rise of behaviorism between 1920 and 1940 resulted in a considerable decline in interest for synesthesia, as it was seen as "little more than a learned association". The number of scientific papers on the topic rebounded around 1980 and exponentially increased in the 21st century, where substantial progress has been made to study it empirically and understand the mechanisms at work.

== Mechanisms ==
Synesthesia is established in early childhood, when the brain is most plastic. There is a genetic predisposition for the condition, but the specific type is determined by environment and learning, which explains why "mappings differ across individuals, but are not strictly random". Furthermore, it manifests as the dominant process in distributed systems, or neural networks, which are dynamic, auto-assemble and self-calibrate. That is what is understood so far, but the specific mechanisms by which synesthesia occurs are still unclear and a general consensus has not yet been reached. There are two main hypotheses: Cross-activation theory and Disinhibited feedback model.

=== Cross-activation theory ===
The cross-activation theory of synesthesia was formulated by V.S. Ramachandran and E.M. Hubard, based on converging evidence from studies of synesthesia that sensory areas for processing real and synesthetic information tend to be neighboring brain regions. This is most apparent in grapheme-color synesthesia, because the brain regions for color processing and visual word form processing are adjacent. Individuals with chromesthesia show activation of brain areas involved in visual processing, such as V4, immediately after the auditory perception, indicating an automatic linking of sounds and colors.

Neonates have increased connectivity between different brain areas, but these hyper-connections are cut back during development. The reason for this cross-activation is unclear, but one hypothesis is that the increased connectivity between adjacent brain regions is due to a reduction in the pruning of neuronal networks during childhood. Another hypothesis is that unusual branching of neurons causes more numerous synaptic connections and cross-activation. These hypotheses align with Daphne Maurer's neonatal hypothesis, which states that all newborns are synesthetes, but the condition disappears at around the age of three months.

Cross-activation may occur at the fusiform gyrus in projector synesthetes (who perceive photisms in external space) and at the angular gyrus in associator synesthetes (who perceive photisms, which come from learned associations, in their mind).

One problem with the cross-activation theory is that synesthesia should be present from birth, but is only evident from mid-childhood.

=== Disinhibited feedback model ===
The disinhibited feedback model is an alternative to the cross-activation theory. The disinhibited feedback model rejects the assumption of increased connectivity in synesthetes and proposes that the cross-activation is due to a decrease of inhibition in the networks present in the normal adult brain. Disinhibited feedback could account for the fact that chromesthesia can be acquired by damage to the retino-cortical pathway or transiently induced through chemical agents, sensory deprivation, meditation, etc.

In all brains, there are anatomical cross-connections where inhibition and excitation are counterbalanced. However, excitation prevails in synesthetes and this disinhibits other structures "to elicit sensory sensations in a second sensory area". One theory that explains how this occurs is neurotransmitter-mediated inhibition. Local inhibitory networks are supposed to confine cortical firing to a specific region, but it leads to a spread of cortical firing, when these networks are blocked by bicuculline.

Forward feeding connections in the brain that receive converging signals from multiple pathways are reciprocated by feedback connections. In most people, feedback connections are sufficiently inhibited to avoid synesthetic induction of a concurrent perception. In synesthetes, it is suggested that feedforward signaling in the inducer pathway could activate neurons, to which both inducer and concurrent pathways converge, and that feedback signaling is capable of propagating down the concurrent pathway to activate the concurrent representation. In this mechanism, feedforward activity from the inducer leads to feedback activation of the concurrent representation.

== Research ==
The mechanism by which synesthesia occurs has yet to be identified. Given that synesthetes and non-synesthetes both match sounds to colors in a non-arbitrary way and that the ingestion of hallucinogenic drugs can induce synesthesia in under an hour, some researchers suggest that synesthetic experience uses existing pathways in the normal brain. The cause of synesthesia is also unclear, although evidence points to a genetic predisposition. Synesthesia runs in families, though the condition may present idiosyncratically within a family. Synesthesia may skip a generation. However, there are cases of monozygotic twins where only one has synesthesia, indicating there may be additional factors.

Differences between synesthetic and non-synesthetic brains may reflect direct hard-wired connections between unimodal auditory and visual regions in the brain, or they may reflect feedback pathways from multimodal audiovisual regions to unimodal visual regions present in all brains.

=== Involvement of specific brain regions ===
In addition to high interconnectivity in synesthesia, there is an apparent contribution from the inferior parietal cortex during synesthetic experiences, possibly serving as the mechanism to bind the real and synesthetic perceptions into one experience. Parietal lobe activation is most apparent when the synesthete is directing attentional focus to the synesthetic experience.

Functional magnetic resonance imaging studies implicate the left superior temporal sulcus for the integration of auditory and visual information. This brain region responds most strongly to congruent pairs of visual and auditory information, such as congruent lip movements and speech.

=== Definitional bias ===
The literature contains conflicting definitional criteria for synesthesia, which could bias selection of research subjects and interpretation of results. Synesthesia has long been described as a 'merging of the senses' or as a kind of 'cross-sensory' experience; however, the condition is not purely sensory/perceptual in all individuals. While this description of synesthesia is useful in describing the condition, it should not be interpreted literally and used as selection criteria for scientific exploration.

Another common defining characteristic of synesthesia is that synesthetic associations are consistent over time. This is generally determined by having individuals report color pairings twice, with several months separating the test from the re-test. Consistency has been described as so fundamental to synesthesia that the test of consistency has become the behavioral 'gold standard' for identifying the genuine condition, and selecting subjects for research. This creates a circular bias, in which virtually all research subjects show consistency over time because they have been selected for it. While consistency, to some extent, may be characteristic of synesthesia, there are individuals that fit all other criteria of synesthesia, but report that their synesthetic associations are not consistent over time.

Another misleading defining characteristic of synesthesia has been that synesthetic concurrents are spatially extended, and the individuals should be able to indicate a spatial location in which the concurrent is experienced. In the case of sound-color synesthesia, those who experience colored photisms from listening to music can often describe the direction of movement of these photisms. While the majority of synesthetes experience a spatial quality to the synesthetic experience, there are still many that report no such quality.

In addition to definitional inclusion/exclusion criteria for synesthesia research, self-report bias is also likely relevant to many studies. This self-report bias, if it exists, would perpetuate itself because the condition would become defined by those cases that become known, and not by those that remain hidden. This is significant because many synesthetic individuals may exclude themselves on the basis of not fitting the prescribed definitional criteria. This is also significant to the extent that synesthetic individuals have a limited ability to differentiate their experience from that of nonsynesthetic individuals.

A possible resolution of these issues would involve defining synesthesia on a neurological basis. Such a unifying neurobiological cause has yet to be found, but if it exists, it would deepen understanding of the phenomenon in ways that the behavioral definition has failed to do.

== Drug-induced chromesthesia ==
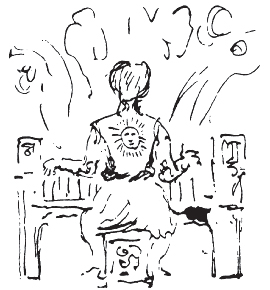
Gautier, under the influence of hashish, depicted his chromesthetic perceptions over the piano as lines of color arising from the music.

Chromesthesia can be transiently induced with chemical agents through the manipulation of neurotransmitters. These substances can also modulate existing synesthesia. Psychoactive drugs including LSD, mescaline, psilocybin, and ayahuasca are non-selective serotonin agonists that elicit spontaneous synesthesia, specially sound-to-color.

The first to report drug-induced chromesthesia was Théophile Gautier in 1845. Under the influence of hashish, he described: "My hearing was developed extraordinarily; I heard the noise of colors. Green, red, blue, yellow sounds reached me in perfectly distinguishable waves". Gautier made a sketch of Gustave Moreau playing the piano, where he depicted his chromesthetic experiences as lines of color above the instrument.

Recent scientific studies, with enhanced methodologies, suggest that drug-induced synesthesia is substantially different from congenital synesthesia. Psychoactive substances "affect ongoing streams of transmission rather than causing stimulus-induced activation". The most common type of synesthesia elicited with chemical agents is chromesthesia. Still, frequent inducers include auditory and visual stimuli, especially music - which could explain the prevalence of sound-to-color synesthesia over other types of synesthesia.

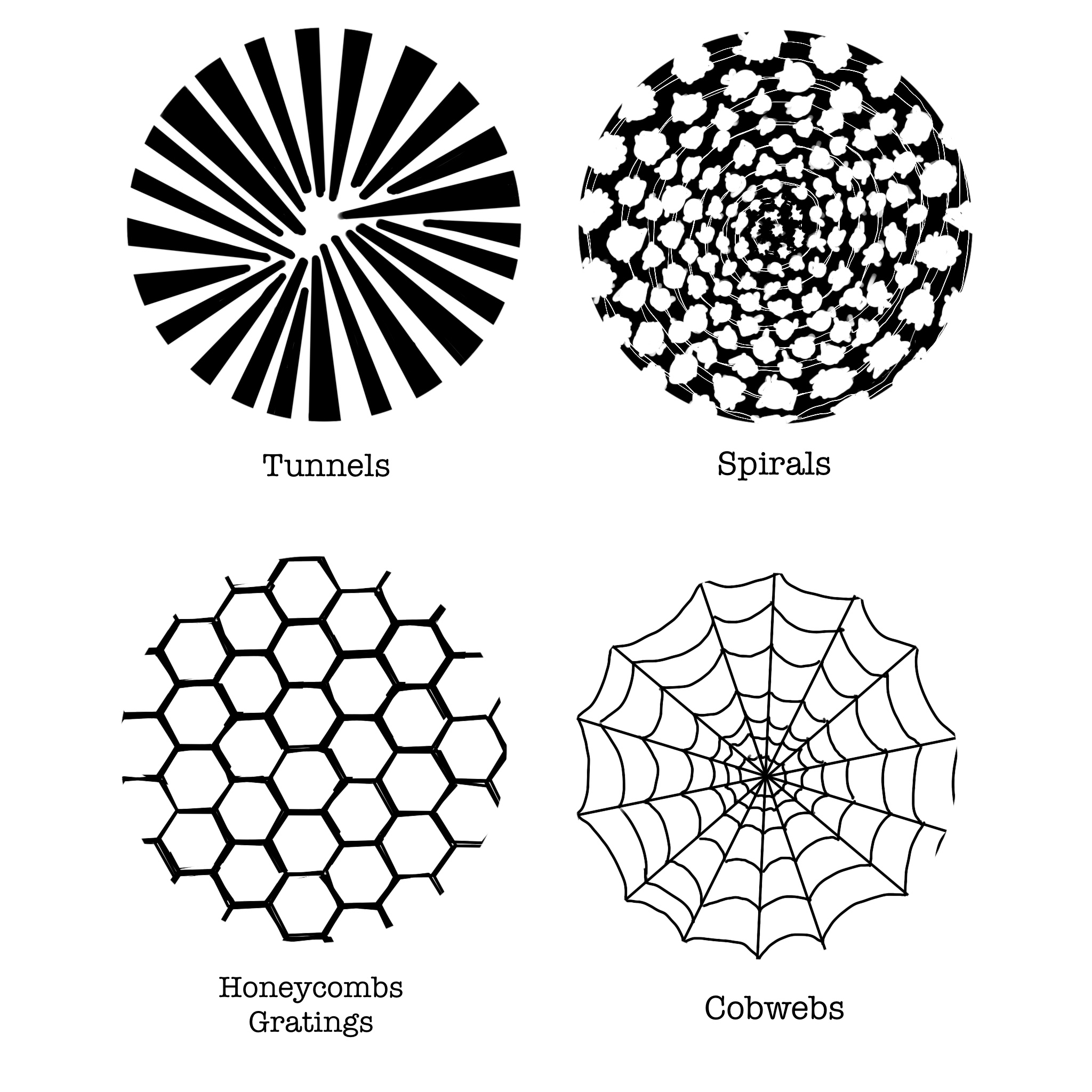
Heinrich Klüver's form constants: Tunnels, Spirals, Honeycombs Gratings, and Cobwebs

Heinrich Klüver categorized recurring geometric shapes under the influence of peyote in the 1920s. He called these the form constants: Tunnels, Spirals, Honeycombs Gratings, and Cobwebs. These also apply to both drug-induced and natural hallucinations, which appear in near-death experiences, sensory deprivation, waking up or falling asleep, and during migraines. According to Klüver, all hallucinations consist of shapes in one of these categories and 'atypical' hallucinations are simply variations. The form constants are common in chromesthetic experiences.

Psychedelics greatly enhance suggestibility, so it is fairly common to mistake hallucinations with chromesthesia; especially considering that all measures of color perception including brightness, saturation, luminance, contrast, and hue are affected due to chemical agents. Drug-induced chromesthesia, as opposed to congenital chromesthesia, is not consistent or automatic. Furthermore, bottom-up processing is responsible for experiences under drug influence, so external stimuli and context are not as critical.

Several studies, both direct (intentionally trying to induce synesthesia) and indirect (participants respond to a set of questions, including one about synesthetic experiences), suggest that the induction of synesthesia with chemical agents is possible. Nevertheless, most studies "suffer from a large number of limitations including a lack of placebo control, double-blinds, and randomized allocation".

Hallucinogen Persisting Perception Disorder occurs when hallucinations continue after the drug has been metabolized by the body.

== Music and chromesthesia ==
Individuals with chromesthesia are more likely to play musical instruments and be artistically inclined. Furthermore, "both the hobbies and occupations of synesthetes are skewed toward the creative industries." People with synesthetic propensities are more metaphorical since the same genes cause them to relate concepts and ideas and, thus, be more creative. This could explain the higher incidence of musicians who have synesthesia.

However, musical experience does not assist the ability to consistently match colors to tones. Against natural expectation, studies have found that possession of absolute pitch increased local variance in matching ability. One possible explanation for this is that because absolute pitch is subject to chance error, occasionally incorrectly inferred note names could compete with the pitch-induced color on particular trials. Another possibility is that people with absolute pitch can label tighter pitch recognition categories than normal, introducing a greater number of category boundaries to cross between distinct tones.

=== Composers with chromesthesia ===
Franz Liszt was a composer who was known for asking performers to play with color. He was noted telling his orchestra to play the music in a "Bluer Fashion," since that is what the tone required. Synesthesia was not a common term in Liszt's time; people thought he was playing a trick on them when he referred to a color instead of a musical term.

Leonard Bernstein openly discussed his chromesthesia, which he described as a "timbre to color." Although he does not reference specific songs as being a certain color, he does explain the way it should sound to the artist performing. There are recordings of him stopping orchestras and singers when they are changing the "timbre." If someone changes the "timbre" or tone in a piece, it does not necessarily change the sound to the listener, but the composer with Chromesthesia will automatically know.

Amy Beach was another composer who had synesthesia. According to her perspective, each key signature was associated with a particular color. If an artist changed the key to suit their voice, then she would become upset because it would change the intended sound, portrayal, and emotion of the piece.

Tori Amos has described seeing music as structures of light since early childhood, an experience consistent with chromesthesia.

Olivier Messiaen was influenced by the color of musical keys for his compositions.

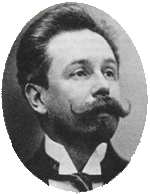
Alexander Scriabin. It is debatable whether Scriabin had chromesthesia or if his analogies were purely associative

==== Alexander Scriabin ====
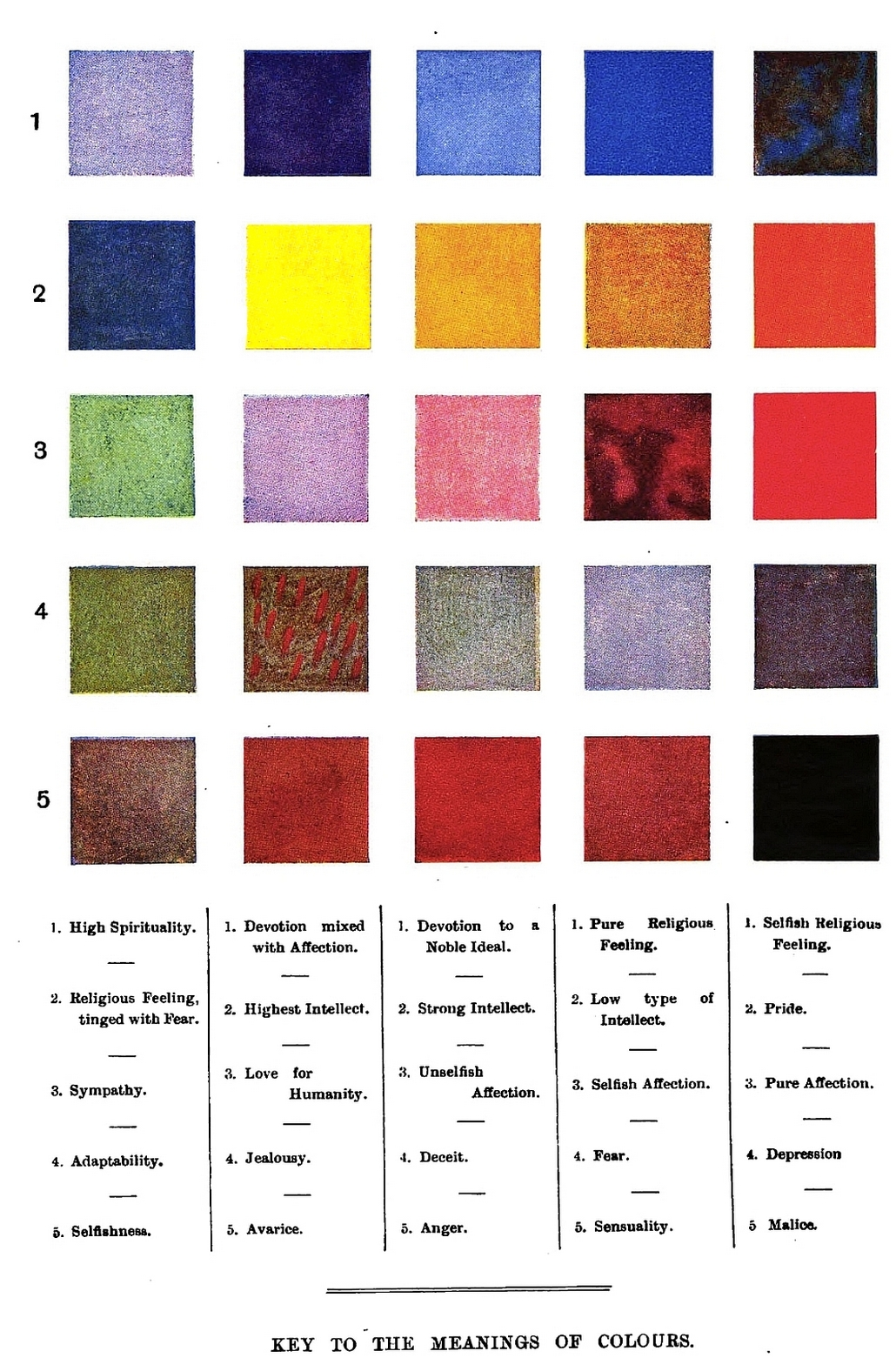
The Theosophist "meanings of colors" of thought-forms and human aura associated with feelings and emotions

Alexander Scriabin was a Russian composer and pianist. He is famously regarded as a synesthete, but there is a lot of controversy surrounding whether he had chromesthesia or not. Scriabin was a major proponent of Theosophy, which had a system associating colors to feelings and emotions. This influenced the musician, who distinguished "spiritual" tonalities (like F-sharp major) from "earthly, material" ones (C major, F major). Furthermore, Alexander Scriabin developed a "keyboard with lights" or clavier à lumières, which directly matched musical notes with colors.

"Scriabin believed integration of colored light within a symphonic work would act as a 'powerful psychological resonator for the listener'". That is why he created the clavier à lumières for his color-symphony Prometheus: The Poem of Fire. This consisted of a color organ, which projected colors on a screen. The musicologist Sabaneyev first published a table of Scriabin's sound-to-color mapping in 1911:

Scriabin's sound-to-color associations
Note	Color
C	Red
G	Orange-pink
D	Yellow
A	Green
E	Whitish-blue
B	Similar to E
F♯	Blue, bright
D♭	Violet
A♭	Purplish-violet
E♭	Steel color with metallic sheen
B♭	Similar to E flat
F	Red, dark

Scriabin was friends with composer Nikolai Rimsky-Korsakov, who was a synesthete, and their sound-to-color associations were not the same. Specifically, Rimsky-Korsakov made a distinction between major and minor scales and his associations had a "more neutral, spontaneous character". Still, different individuals respond to some sounds and not others, and sound-to-color associations vary greatly between them.

Scriabin's sound-to-color associations arranged into a circle of fifths, demonstrating its spectral quality

When the notes are ordered by the circle of fifths, the colors are in order of a spectrum, which casts doubt on whether Scriabin experienced chromesthesia:

Scriabin's sound-to-color circle of fifths
Note	Color
C	Red
G	Orange
D	Yellow
A	Green
E	Sky blue
B	Blue
F♯/ G♭	Bright blue or violet
D♭	Violet or purple
A♭	Violet or lilac
E♭	Flesh or steel
B♭	Rose
F	Deep red

Whether Scriabin had chromesthesia or not, his work was greatly influenced by the particularities of this phenomenon. He created a system that associated colors to tones and aimed to create holistic sensory experiences with his compositions. Not only did he experiment with colors, but also with "the generation of scents and sensation of touch and taste".

== See also ==
- Synesthesia in classical composers
