= Synesthesia in classical composers =

Chromesthesia is a form of synesthesia that has been documented among musicians throughout centuries. Individuals with chromesthesia sense involuntary perceptions of color in response to auditory stimuli such as music, speech, and or environmental sounds. The condition is thought to result from atypical cross-activation between aural and visual processing regions of the brain. Several well-known musicians and composers have described chromesthetic experiences, leading to interest in its potential influence on musical perception and composition.

== Notable documented cases ==
=== Classical Musicians ===
==== Amy Beach ====
American composer Amy Beach (1867–1944) has been cited as a documented case of chromesthesia. Scholarly accounts indicate that Beach consistently associated specific musical keys with particular colors throughout her life, a phenomenon she described from early childhood. Her reported associations included C major as white, G major as red, A major as green, A♭ major as blue, and minor keys such as G♯ minor and F♯ minor as black. Researchers have noted that these color–key associations appear to have influenced her compositional practice, particularly in works that reference nature, light, and spirituality, where harmonic choices align with her synesthetic color perceptions.

==== Alexander Scriabin ====
Russian composer Alexander Scriabin (1872–1915) is one of the most well-documented cases of chromesthesia among composers. He associated specific tonalities with particular colors and believed these correspondences reflected a systematic relationship between the circle of fifths and the color spectrum. Scriabin created a full tone–color system, mapping each pitch class to a hue (e.g., C = red, G = orange, D = yellow, A = green, E = blue, B = blue‑violet, F♯ = bright blue, etc.) He stated that projecting the appropriate color could “make the tonality more evident,” enhancing musical perception. Scriabin incorporated this system into Prometheus: The Poem of Fire (1910), which includes a notated “Tastiera per luce” (keyboard of lights) intended to project colors corresponding to harmonic changes. In this work, the faster-moving voice of the luce part indicates the transposition level of the “mystic chord,” determining the projected color. Analytical studies note his frequent use of minor-third and tritone root progressions, intervals that symmetrically divide the octave and structure both harmonic movement and color transitions.

==== Franz Liszt ====
During an 1842 rehearsal in Weimar, Franz Liszt reportedly interrupted the orchestra with the request, “Gentlemen, a little bluer, if you please,” later clarifying that a passage should not sound “so rose,” but instead “deep violet”. These remarks, recorded in Neue Berliner Musikzeitung, suggest that he conceived of orchestral timbre in explicitly chromatic terms. At the time, synesthesia had not yet been formally recognized as a neurological condition, yet Liszt consistently described musical sonorities through color language, including statements such as, “This tone type requires it… That is a deep violet, please, depend on it!”. Modern accounts classify such experiences as sound-to-color synesthesia, in which auditory stimuli automatically trigger color perception. Although retrospective diagnosis is inherently uncertain, Liszt’s rehearsal instructions align with descriptions of chromesthesia documented in contemporary research. His case also illustrates a broader nineteenth-century context in which artistic discourse frequently merged sensory modalities, even before scientific frameworks existed to explain them.

==== Oliver Messiaen ====
French composer and organist Olivier Messiaen (1908–1992) is frequently discussed in relation to chromesthesia and color–sound association. Although he stated that he did not possess clinical synesthesia in the neurological sense, he described experiencing “a sort of synesthesia” in which he perceived specific colors inwardly when hearing or reading music. He emphasized that these perceptions were neither imaginative nor physical sensations, but an “inward reality,” and in some cases he notated corresponding colors directly in his scores. Throughout his career, color functioned as a structural element in his compositions, with works such as Chronochromie (1960) and Couleurs de la cité céleste (1963) explicitly linking musical form to color relationships. Messiaen described constructing “color chords” based on his associations, sometimes deriving hues from birdsong, landscapes, or stained glass, and asserted that in certain works “the form of the work depends entirely on colours”. In his treatise, "Technique de mon language musical" Messiaen mentions colour associations such as chords and modes as “stained‑glass” color combinations. For example, Mode 2 (octatonic) as blue‑violet with gold and red. His integration of color, harmony, and spiritual symbolism became central to his compositional identity and critical reception in the twentieth century.

=== Jazz composers ===
==== Duke Ellington ====
American composer, pianist, and bandleader Duke Ellington (1899–1974) has been described as experiencing synesthesia, perceiving musical sounds in terms of color and visual pattern. According to accounts by his nephew Stephen D. James, Ellington heard instrumental timbres as distinct hues, describing, for example, trumpeter Bubber Miley’s sound as “dark blue” and alto saxophonist Johnny Hodges’s tone as “light blue satin”. Ellington reportedly regarded his orchestra as a painter’s palette and likened his performances to creating a new painting each night, conducting with sweeping gestures that visually traced musical lines in the air. Observers have suggested that these color–sound associations informed his approach to orchestration and ensemble writing, contributing to his distinctive treatment of instrumental texture and timbre.
