= Anniversary Game =

American TV game show (1969–1970)

- Created by: Larry Miller
- Presented by: Alan Hamel
- Announcer: Dean Webber
- Country of origin: United States

Production
- Running time: 30 minutes

Original release
- Network: Syndicated (daily)
- Release: January 27, 1969 – September 1970

The Anniversary Game is a daily syndicated game show that involved three married couples competing for points and prizes by performing stunts and answering questions, à la Beat the Clock. The host was Alan Hamel, with voice-over artist Dean Webber announcing.

The program was taped in San Francisco at KGO-TV, formerly the home of Oh My Word.

== Game play ==
The object of the game was to earn more points than the other couples to win the "anniversary surprise". The first round consisted of each spouse predicting how the other would react to a practical joke or zany gag. If they were correct, the team would win points.

In the second round, the couples teamed up against each other in order to complete the stunt. The winning team would then receive points.

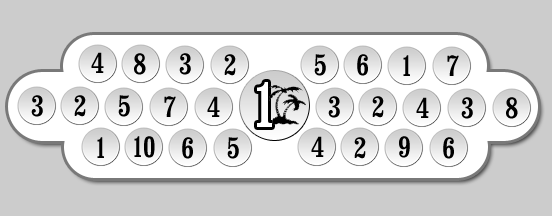
The light board used on The Anniversary Game.

In the final round, all the couples competed against one another to answer general knowledge questions (this was not a timed portion of the game; there was no countdown clock as in the Sale of the Century speed round). Point values were determined by a randomly flashing point-value board (see accompanying image) showing numbered lights with values ranging from 1 to 10 points; a player sounding in to answer pressed his/her button, stopping the flashing sequence on a particular point value. A special 1-point prize such as a vacation trip was positioned at the middle of the board (and rarely hit). The board had three rows, two having eight different point values, and the middle row having eleven values split by the "big 1". A player sounding in was recognized by the couple's name and then the point value - e.g., "4 points, Shermans." The team with the most points overall won a merchandise prize called the "anniversary surprise".

== Trivia ==
One of the prize models during the series run was Suzanne Somers, whom Hamel would marry in 1977.

Footage of the series is heard and shown playing on TV in the 1970 Marlo Thomas film Jenny.

== Series status ==
The series has not been seen since its original run. It is unknown whether or not video tape of the series still exists. The series may have never been archived.

In March 2025, an episode of the show was found on audio tape.
