= Camelia Somers =

American actress

- Born: Camelia Marie Somers; October 2, 1995 (age 30); Los Angeles, California, U.S.
- Education: University of Southern California
- Occupation: Actress
- Years active: 2003–present
- Parent: Bruce Somers Jr. (father)
- Relatives: Suzanne Somers (paternal grandmother)

Camelia Marie Somers (born October 2, 1995) is an American actress and Suzanne Somers' granddaughter. She is known for her television role as Charlotte on the daytime soap opera The Bold and the Beautiful on CBS.

== Early life ==
Somers was born in Los Angeles, California. Her father, Bruce Somers Jr., is the owner and chief storyteller of Sincbox Media. Her mother, Caroline Somers, is an author, businesswoman and a producer. Somers has done commercials in the past at a young age. She attended Harvard Westlake in Studio City, California, where she played a leading role in the school's production of the musical Hairspray. She was also involved in choir and cheer/dance. Somers attended the University of Southern California, graduating in 2018.

== Career ==
Somers began her acting career in The Bold and the Beautiful as an intern. She is now a recurring actress on the show playing the role of Charlotte.
