= Bent Formby =

- Born: Copenhagen
- Education: Ph.D. University of Copenhagen
- Employer(s): Sansum Medical Research Institute, Rasmus Institute for Medical Research

Bent Formby is a biochemist and researcher. He was born in Copenhagen, and came to the U.S. as a visiting professor in 1979. He co-authored two books and several articles on endocrinology with T. S. Wiley.

== Background ==
Formby began his career at the Sansum Medical Research Institute in the early 1980s, where he concentrated on biochemical models of insulin resistance in diabetes, and also looked at hormone receptors in cancer animal models. His work in diabetes covered receptor sites for specific insulin molecules, and in cancer research, he was involved with some of initial research in estrogen-receptor hormones, which led the way for the use of specific types of therapies such as Tamoxifen. He is considered one of the world's authorities on environmental aspects as they relate to hormone reactions.

== Bibliography ==
=== Journal articles ===
- Clausen J, Formby B (1967). "Effect of noradrenaline on phosphatase activity in synaptic membrane of the rat brain". Nature. 213 (5074): 389–90. Bibcode:1967Natur.213..389C. doi:10.1038/213389a0. PMID 4291480. S2CID 4163536.

=== Popular books ===
- Wiley, TS; Bent Formby (February 27, 2001). Lights Out: Sleep, Sugar, and Survival. Atria. ISBN 0-671-03868-0.
- Wiley, TS; Julie Taguchi; Bent Formby (September 14, 2004). Sex, Lies, and Menopause: The Shocking Truth About Synthetic Hormones and the Benefits of Natural Alternatives. Harper Paperback imprint of HarperCollins. ISBN 0-06-054234-9.
