= Ray Bellew =

Canadian actor

- Born: March 26, 1939; Montreal, Quebec, Canada
- Died: October 10, 2006 (aged 67); St. John's, Newfoundland and Labrador, Canada
- Occupations: actor, performer

Ray Bellew (March 26, 1939 – October 10, 2006) was a Canadian actor and performer.

== Early life and education ==
Bellew was born in Montreal, Quebec, Canada. He had two sisters, Claudette and Majorie. Claudette, his younger sister, died on January 4, 2012.

== Career ==
In the 1960s he moved to Newfoundland to host a teen radio show, Now Sound. He starred as the title character in the TV series Skipper and Company in St. John's, Newfoundland, which ran on the CBC's Newfoundland affiliate CBNT from 1974 to 1982.

Throughout the 1960s, Bellew was in the Canadian series Last of the Mohicans with Lon Chaney Jr, as well as Razzle Dazzle, featuring puppet Howard the Turtle. Bellew also performed in The Forest Rangers, Gordon Pinsent's Quentin Durgens, M.P., Cannonball, CBC TV Theatre, On Camera, Folio, and Star Time Theatre, among others. He was in CBC Toronto's production of Macbeth with Sean Connery (before Connery starred in his first James Bond film).

During the 1990s, he hosted the Weekend Arts Magazine in Newfoundland and Labrador. In the late 1990s, Bellew performed as the personification of P.J. Billington, of the P.J. Billington's restaurants. He made public appearances and voiced radio and TV advertisements.

== Personal life ==
Bellew and his wife Rose had two daughters, Kelli and Lauren, and a son, Sean. He had two sons, Mark and Christopher, and two daughters, Kim and Robyn, from a previous marriage to Brenda.

He was a skilled magician.

After retiring from performing, he became depressed, alcoholic, and abusive. In 2002, Bellew was sentenced to six months under house arrest and two years probation and prohibition from imbibing alcohol. He pleaded guilty to assaulting and threatening his wife. The couple reconciled.

Bellew died in St. John's.
