= Razzle Dazzle =

Canadian television series (1961–1966)

- Alan Hamel, Howard the Turtle and Michele Finney, together with prospective meal.
- Presented by: Alan Hamel; Michele Finney; Ray Bellew; Trudy Young
- Country of origin: Canada
- No. of seasons: 5

Production
- Running time: 30 minutes

Original release
- Network: CBC Television
- Release: October 2, 1961 – July 1, 1966

Razzle Dazzle is a Canadian children's television program produced by the Canadian Broadcasting Corporation between October 2, 1961, and July 1, 1966.

The series was initially co-hosted by Alan Hamel and Michele Finney, later replaced by Ray Bellew and Trudy Young. There was also a cast of characters who appeared in every episode, most notably the puppet Howard the Turtle (John Keogh), who was considered the star of the show. Howard would tell jokes which he called Groaners. Other recurring characters on the show included Howard's nemesis, Percy Q. Kidpester (Ed McNamara / drawn by George Feyer); conman and travelling salesman, Mr. Sharpey (Paul Kligman) who was known for saying "A knuckle full of nickels" and the general store proprietor, Mr. Igotit.

Fans of the show could write in to become members of the Razzle Dazzle Fan Club. They were sent, in a large Manila envelope, the following fan club items: the Razzle Dazzle Membership Letter of Welcome; the Razzle Dazzle Fan Club Newspaper; the Razzle Dazzle Fan Club Button, featuring Howard the Turtle's glowing face, and the Razzle Dazzle Secret Decoder Wheel, which fans would assemble out of paper. A highlight of the show was the Secret Decoder Wheel message. At the end of each show, a secret message was shown on the TV screen. Home users of a Decoder Wheel could then decipher the message. It was a code similar in nature to Superman's Secret Code, used by the Supermen of America/Superman Fan Club, sponsored by DC Comics and appearing in issues of the Superman Family of comics published at that time, featuring Superman's Secret Message. A further connection to DC Comics appeared in the fact that both Howard the Turtle appeared on the show as a character called Super Turtle and an illustrated character backup feature in DC Comics appeared at this same period in time also called Super-Turtle, drawn by Henry Boltinoff.

"Spots and Stripes" was often a feature on the show, where groups of kids competed against each other in two teams, the "Spots" and the "Stripes".

Another regular feature was the serialization of a children's adventure series in the final five minutes (thus spreading each episode over a week's worth of shows). Initially shown was The Magic Boomerang, an Australian adventure series, followed by The Adventures of the Terrible Ten. This was replaced by the Canadian-made The Forest Rangers which was spun off to become a series of its own.

The writer of most of the scripts was Jerry Rochwerg (Jerry Ross). He went on to have a long career in Hollywood winning an Emmy for The Bill Cosby Show.
