= Alan Hamel =

Canadian entertainer, producer and television host

- Born: June 30, 1936 (age 89); Toronto, Ontario, Canada
- Occupations: Producer; writer; actor; television host
- Years active: 1960–2012
- Spouses: Marilyn Shapiro (m. 1958; div. 1971) Suzanne Somers (m. 1977; died 2023)
- Partner: Joanna Cassidy (2025–present)
- Children: 2

Alan Hamel (born June 30, 1936) is a Canadian entertainer, producer, and television host.

== Early life ==
Hamel was born in Toronto of Jewish descent. He was in the television arts program at Ryerson Institute of Technology in 1954 but did not graduate.

== Career ==
Hamel co-hosted the Canadian children's television series Razzle Dazzle (1961–64). The show featured a talking turtle, Howard. In the late 1960s he hosted two syndicated game shows which aired on all the ABC owned and operated TV stations as well as others: Wedding Party (1968) and Anniversary Game (1969), where he first met Suzanne Somers, whom he later married in 1977. From 1971 to 1973, Hamel hosted Mantrap, a weekday daytime panel show, from BCTV in Vancouver for CTV Television Network stations in Canada, and syndicated in the U.S.A. In the late 1970s, he hosted The Alan Hamel Show, a popular daytime talk show on CTV. People magazine considered him "Canada's leading TV talk show host". During that time, he hosted the ill-fated People television series on CBS for a few months in 1978. After Hamel stepped down as host in 1980, fellow Canadian Alan Thicke took over and the show was retitled The Alan Thicke Show and, later, Don Harron continued the franchise as host of his own eponymous talk show that aired in the same time slot.

For several years during the late 1970s and early 1980s, Hamel was a commercial pitchman for American Stores, a coast-to-coast chain of supermarkets. Specifically, he did advertisements for Alpha Beta stores in the western United States, and also appeared in occasional spots for Acme Markets in the northeastern United States.

Hamel eventually became a producer, often working on projects involving his wife. He occasionally performed as an actor as well, also sometimes on Somers' shows.

== Personal life ==
Hamel has two children, a son Stephen and a daughter Leslie, from his first marriage to Marilyn Hamel. He met his second wife, actress and author Suzanne Somers while she worked as a prize model on The Anniversary Game, a game show he hosted. Although he was already married, they began a relationship which led to an abortion. Hamel and Somers lived together for about nine years before finally marrying on November 19, 1977. A rabbi and a Catholic priest officiated at their wedding. Hamel is stepfather to Bruce Somers Jr., Suzanne Somers' son from a previous teen marriage. Suzanne Somers died on October 15, 2023. In June 2025, it was reported that he is in a relationship with Somers' former co-star Joanna Cassidy.

Somers and Hamel bought a house in Palm Springs, California, in 1977, and they sold it in 2021 for $8.5 million. In January 2007, a wildfire in Southern California destroyed their home in Malibu, California.

== Filmography ==
- 1960: Midnight Zone (CBC)
- 1961: Junior Roundup - Host
- 1961–64: Razzle Dazzle (CBC Television)
- 1962: A Summer Night - Host
- 1963: Nightcap (TV series)
- 1965: Vacation Time - Co-host
- 1968: Wedding Party (ABC/syndicated)
- 1969: Anniversary Game (ABC/syndicated)
- 1971–72: Mantrap - Host
- 1972–73: Alan Hamel's Comedy Bag (CBC)
- 1976–80: The Alan Hamel Show (CTV)
- 1977: Tattletales (CBS)
- 1977: Lou Grant in Scoop as Councilman Garbers
- 1977: The Last Hurrah (TV movie) as George Sherrard
- 1978: All in the Family in The Commercial as Ricky Buffano
- 1979: Look Magazine Gala Party (TV movie)
- 1988: She's the Sheriff in All Alone (1988) as Horton
