= Suzanne Somers =

American actress (1946–2023)

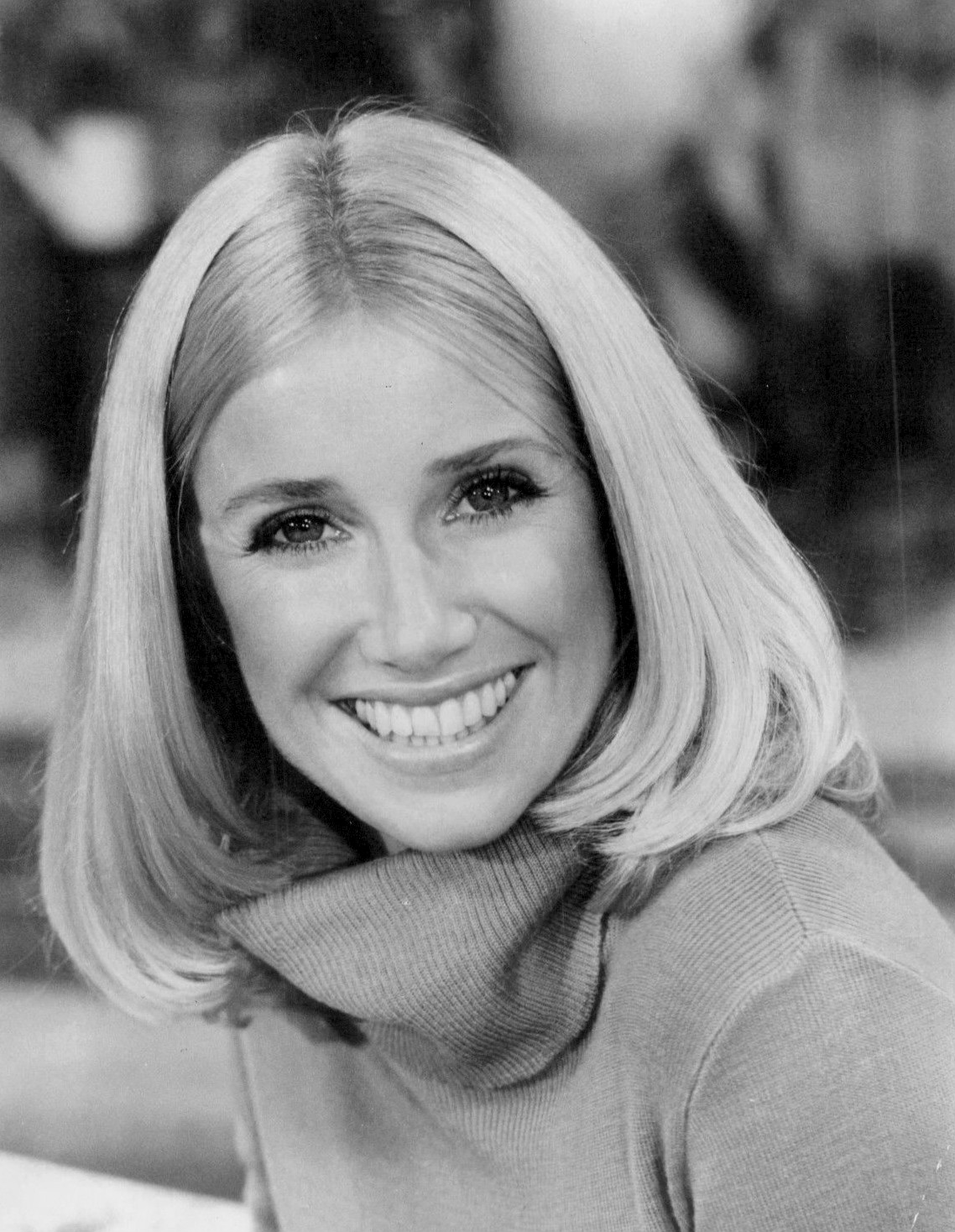
- Somers in 1977
- Born: Suzanne Marie Mahoney; October 16, 1946; San Bruno, California, U.S.
- Died: October 15, 2023 (aged 76); Palm Springs, California, U.S.
- Resting place: Desert Memorial Park in Palm Springs, California
- Occupations: Actress; author; businesswoman
- Years active: 1968–2023
- Notable work: Three's Company; Step by Step
- Spouses: Bruce Somers (m. 1965; div. 1968) Alan Hamel (m. 1977)
- Children: 1
- Relatives: Camelia Somers (granddaughter)
- Website: suzannesomers.com

Suzanne Marie Somers (née Mahoney; October 16, 1946 – October 15, 2023) was an American actress, author, and businesswoman. She played the television roles of Chrissy Snow on Three's Company (1977–1981) and Carol Foster Lambert on Step by Step (1991–1998).

Somers wrote more than 25 books, including two autobiographies, four diet books, and a book of poetry. She was also well known for advertising the ThighMaster, an exercise device. While 14 of her books were best sellers and most were focused on health and well-being, doctors criticized her promotion of bioidentical hormone replacement therapy and alternative cancer treatments.

== Early life ==
Suzanne Marie Mahoney was born in San Bruno, California, on October 16, 1946 as the third of four children in a dysfunctional working class Irish American Roman Catholic family. Her mother, Marion Elizabeth (née Turner), was a medical secretary, and her father, Francis "Frank" Mahoney, loaded cases of beer onto boxcars, and was a laborer and gardener. Her father was an alcoholic and was abusive, and Somers often worried that he would kill her.

Somers first attended Mercy High School in Burlingame, California, but had trouble with her schoolwork because of dyslexia and her father's all-night rages, and she would often fall asleep in class. At school, she performed the lead role in a production of H.M.S. Pinafore. She was expelled at age 14 for writing sexually suggestive notes to a boy that were never sent.

At age 17, Suzanne's father ripped off her prom dress and told her that she was "nothing," and she responded by hitting him in the head with a tennis racket.

In 1964, Somers graduated from Capuchino High School in San Bruno, where she won the "Best Doll Award" for her role in the senior musical Guys and Dolls and helped organize her class's senior ball. She then attended San Francisco College for Women (Lone Mountain College), a college run by the Catholic Society of the Sacred Heart order, but withdrew in 1965 when she learned that she was pregnant. She married her child's father, Bruce Somers, days later at age 19. Her situation led to low self-esteem. She was arrested for check fraud and her car was impounded.

== Career ==
=== Early career ===
"I made my living by making chocolate desserts and selling them to restaurants in Sausalito, California, and by making children’s dresses and selling them on consignment to little children’s stores."

Somers began acting in small roles during the late 1960s and early 1970s.

Somers modelled for Grimme Modeling Agency in San Francisco.

After divorcing in 1968, Somers worked as a prize model, on Anniversary Game, a game show, based at KGO-TV in San Francisco, hosted by Alan Hamel and produced by Circle Seven Productions.

From 1971 to 1973, Somers was a panelist on the Alan Hamel-hosted Mantrap, a weekday daytime panel show, from BCTV in Vancouver for CTV Television Network stations in Canada, and syndicated in the United States.

In 1973, Somers appeared in bit parts in movies, such as the "Blonde in the white Thunderbird" in American Graffiti' and an uncredited role as a "pool girl" in Magnum Force.

In 1974, Somers appeared in an episode of the American version of the sitcom Lotsa Luck, based on the British sitcom On the Buses, as the femme fatale. It led to her first appearance, 21 February 1974, on The Tonight Show Starring Johnny Carson, promoting her book of poetry. In 2009, Kristen Wiig gave a reading of excerpts from Suzanne Somers' book of poetry Touch Me, for Celebrity Autobiography (KUSH). Later that year, Somers made an appearance in The Rockford Files and did an audition to guest host AM San Francisco on KGO-TV alongside Jim Lange.

Somers also had a guest-starring role on The Six Million Dollar Man in the 1977 episode "Cheshire Project". She played a passenger on the first episode of The Love Boat and made a guest appearance in a 1976 episode of One Day at a Time.

=== Three's Company ===
After actresses Suzanne Zenor and Susan Lanier did not impress producers during the first two pilot episodes of the ABC sitcom Three's Company, based on the British sitcom Man About the House, Somers was suggested by ABC president Fred Silverman, who had seen her in her initial appearance on The Tonight Show Starring Johnny Carson. Silverman hired her the day before the taping of the third and final pilot commenced. Somers portrayed Christmas "Chrissy" Snow, who exemplified many blonde stereotypes and was employed as an office secretary. At first, Somers made $3,500 per week from the show.

The series co-starred John Ritter and Joyce DeWitt in a comedy about two single women living with a single man who pretended to be gay in order to bypass the landlord's policy of prohibiting single men sharing an apartment with single women. The program was an instant success in the Nielsen ratings, eventually spawning a short-lived spin-off series, The Ropers, loosely based on the British sitcom George and Mildred, starring Norman Fell and Audra Lindley.

When Three's Company began its fifth season in late 1980, Somers demanded a salary increase "from $30,000 an episode to $150,000 an episode, equal to what Ritter was making and comparable to the salaries of other male sitcom stars at the time" as well as 10% of the show's profits. DeWitt and Somers were paid the same, less than Ritter, but DeWitt also had a "favored nations" clause in her contract, which guaranteed she received equal terms to other cast members. Somers' request was influenced by her second husband and manager, Alan Hamel.

"The night before we went in to renegotiate, I got a call from a friend who had connections high up at ABC, and he said, 'They’re going to hang a nun in the marketplace, and the nun is Suzanne,' The network was willing to do this because, earlier that year, the women on Laverne & Shirley had gotten what they asked for, and they wanted to put a stop to it. They’d destroy the chemistry on Company to make a point." — Alan Hamel, 2015

ABC was willing to offer only a $5,000 per episode raise. Somers then refused to appear in the second and fourth episodes of the season, citing excuses such as a broken rib. She finished the remaining season on her contract; however, her role was reduced to just 60 seconds per episode, with her character appearing in only the episode's closing tag in which Chrissy calls the trio's apartment from her parents' home. After ABC fired her from the program and terminated her contract, Somers sued the network for $2 million, saying her credibility in show business had been damaged. The lawsuit was settled by an arbitrator who decided Somers was owed only $30,000, due to a single missed episode for which she had not been paid. Future rulings also favored the network and producers. Somers said she was fired for asking to be paid as much as popular male television stars.

=== After Three's Company ===
During the 1980s and 1990s, Somers was a spokesperson for Polaris Vac-Sweep automated pool cleaner.

In 1983, through her Hamel/Somers Productions, she signed a deal with Columbia Pictures Television.

Somers and her Three's Company co-star, John Ritter, reconciled their friendship after 20 years of not speaking to each other, shortly before Ritter's death in 2003.

Somers appeared in two Playboy cover-feature nude pictorials, in 1980 and 1984. Her first set of nude photos was taken by Stan Malinowski in February 1970 when Somers was a struggling model and actress and did a test photoshoot for the magazine. She was accepted as a Playmate candidate in 1971, but declined to pose nude before the actual shoot. During an appearance on The Tonight Show in 1980, she denied ever posing nude, except for a High Society topless photo. This prompted Playboy to publish photos from the 1970 Malinowski shoot, without her permission. Somers' original motivation for posing nude was to be able to pay medical bills related to injuries her son Bruce Jr. suffered in a car accident. By the time the photos were published, her son was 14 and Somers feared seeing his mother posing nude would be difficult for him. Somers sued Playboy and settled for $50,000, which was donated to charity, with at least $10,000 of it going to Easterseals. The second nude pictorial by Richard Fegley appeared in December 1984 in an attempt by Somers to regain her diminished popularity after the Three's Company debacle in 1981. Despite her anger and the earlier lawsuit, Playboy approached her earlier that year to pose nude a second time. Initially she was angered again, but eventually agreed after discussing it with her family. She felt she would have a better chance to control the quality of the photos the second time, and having such control was an important condition that Somers attached to posing. Despite Somers' earlier belief that her son would not want to see his mother nude, her then 18-year-old son did view the second pictorial.

In the 1980s, Somers lived in Las Vegas and was an entertainer, headlining at the MGM Grand for two years until the theater burned down and then at the Las Vegas Hilton for another 2 1/2 years. In 1986 the Las Vegas critics voted her Female Entertainer of the Year.

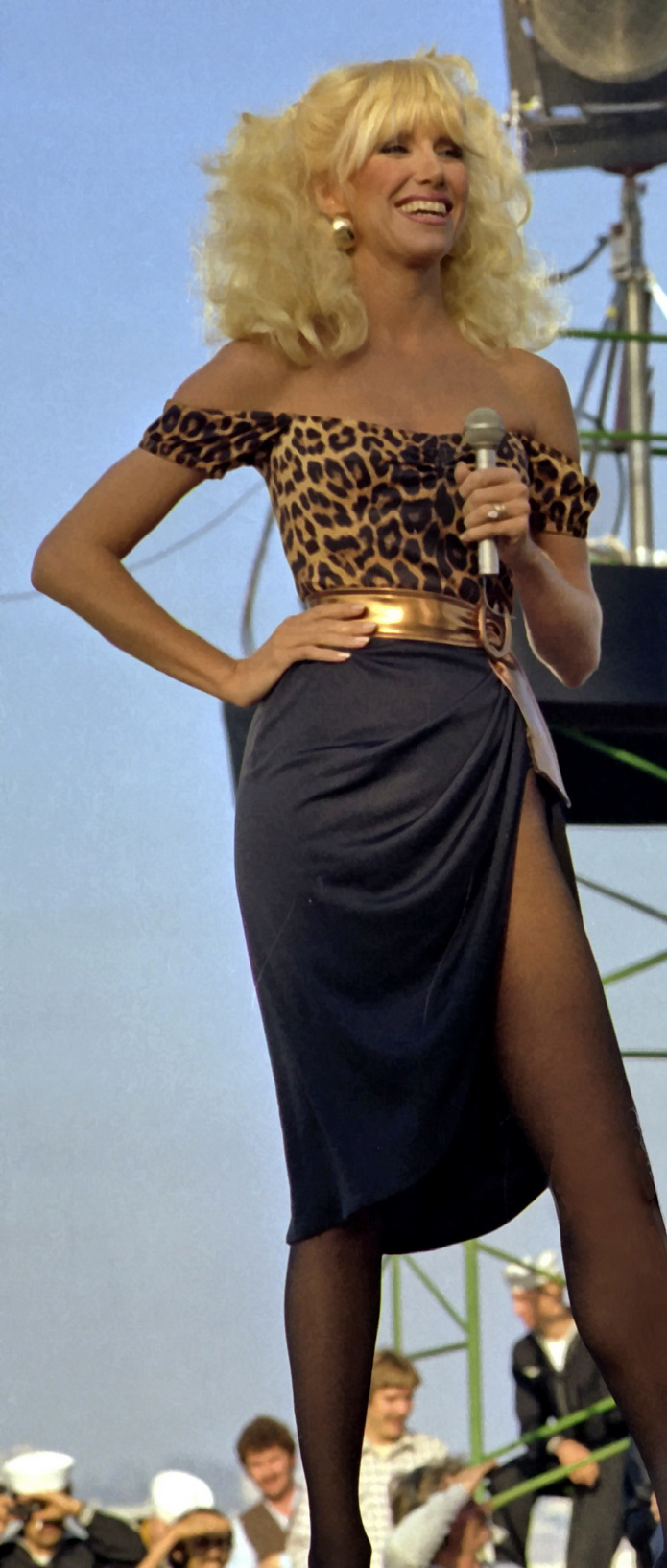
Suzanne Somers on the USS Ranger in 1981

In the early 1980s, Somers performed for U.S. servicemen overseas.

From 1987 to 1989, Somers starred in the sitcom She's the Sheriff, which ran in first-run syndication. Somers portrayed a widow with two young children who decided to fill the shoes of her late husband, a sheriff of a Nevada town. The show ran for two seasons.

In 1990, Somers returned to network television, appearing in numerous guest roles and made-for-TV movies.

=== Later career ===
In September 1991, Somers returned to series television in the sitcom Step By Step (with Patrick Duffy), which became a success on ABC's youth-orientated TGIF lineup.

In the early 1990s, Somers was the spokeswoman in a series of infomercials for the ThighMaster, a piece of exercise equipment which exercises the hip adductors and is squeezed between one's thighs above the knees. In 2014, Somers was inducted into the Infomercial Hall of Fame.

In 1991 a two-hour biographical film of Somers, starring the actress herself, entitled Keeping Secrets, based on her first autobiography of the same title, was broadcast on ABC. The movie chronicled Somers' troubled family life and upbringing, along with her subsequent rise to fame.

In 1994, Somers launched a daytime talk show titled Suzanne Somers, which lasted one season.

Step By Step continued on ABC until the end of its sixth season in 1997, when the series moved to CBS for what turned out to be its final season.

From 1997 to 1999, Somers co-hosted the revised Candid Camera show, when CBS revived it with Peter Funt.

In the 2000s, Somers appeared on the Home Shopping Network for more than 25 hours per month, selling household items, clothing and jewelry that she designed.

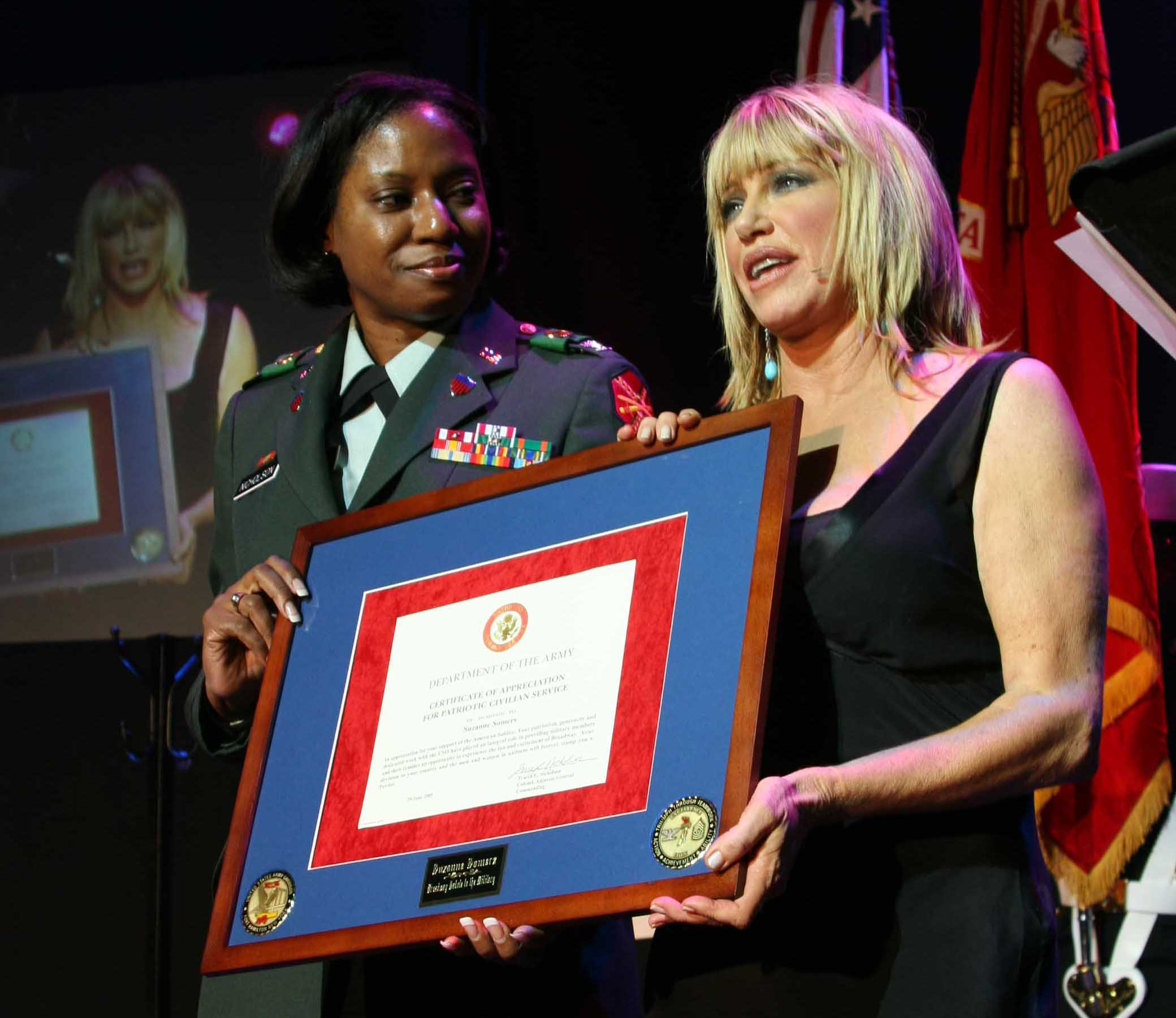
Somers receiving patriotic civilian service award for past USO tour performances after performing The Blonde in the Thunderbird for members of the U.S. military and their families

In January 2004, The Blonde in the Thunderbird premiered at the Spreckels Theatre in San Diego, later playing at the Princess of Wales Theatre in Toronto, June 16 though June 26, 2004. In the summer of 2005, Somers made her Broadway theatre debut in a one-woman show, The Blonde in the Thunderbird, a collection of stories about her life and career, based on her books, Keeping Secrets and After the Fall, by Somers. The show was supposed to run from July 8 until September 3, 2005, but was cancelled in less than a week after poor reviews and disappointing ticket sales. She blamed the harsh reviews: The New York Times referred to it as "...a drab and embarrassing display of emotional exhibitionism masquerading as entertainment." The Associated Press referred to it as "an extended therapy session crossed with a tacky Las Vegas revue – minus the other showgirls". She compared her treatment by critics with the treatment of soldiers in the Iraq War, prompting even more criticism.

In 2012, Somers began an online video talk show, Suzanne Somers Breaking Through, at CafeMom. Three of the episodes featured a reunion and reconciliation with former Three's Company co-star Joyce DeWitt; the two had not seen nor spoken to each other in 31 years. Somers and Dewitt briefly discussed John Ritter and how glad they were they both had spoken with him shortly before his sudden death.

In the fall of 2012, The Suzanne Show, hosted by Somers, aired for a 13-episode season on the Lifetime Network. Somers welcomed various guests covering a wide range of topics relating to health and fitness.

On February 24, 2015, Somers was announced as one of the stars participating on the 20th season of Dancing with the Stars. Her partner was professional dancer Tony Dovolani. Somers and Dovolani were eliminated in the fifth week of competition and finished in 9th place.

In May and June 2015, Somers starred in "Suzanne Sizzles" at the Westgate Las Vegas.

== Medical views ==
Somers supported bioidentical hormone replacement therapy. Her book Ageless includes interviews with 16 practitioners of bioidentical hormone therapy but focuses on one specific approach, the Wiley protocol. A group of seven doctors, all of whom practice bioidentical hormone therapy to address women's health issues, issued a public letter to Somers and her publisher, Crown Publishing Group, stating that the protocol is scientifically unproven and dangerous and citing Wiley's lack of medical and clinical qualifications. Somers appeared on The Oprah Winfrey Show and was praised by Winfrey for her views, but negative press coverage followed.

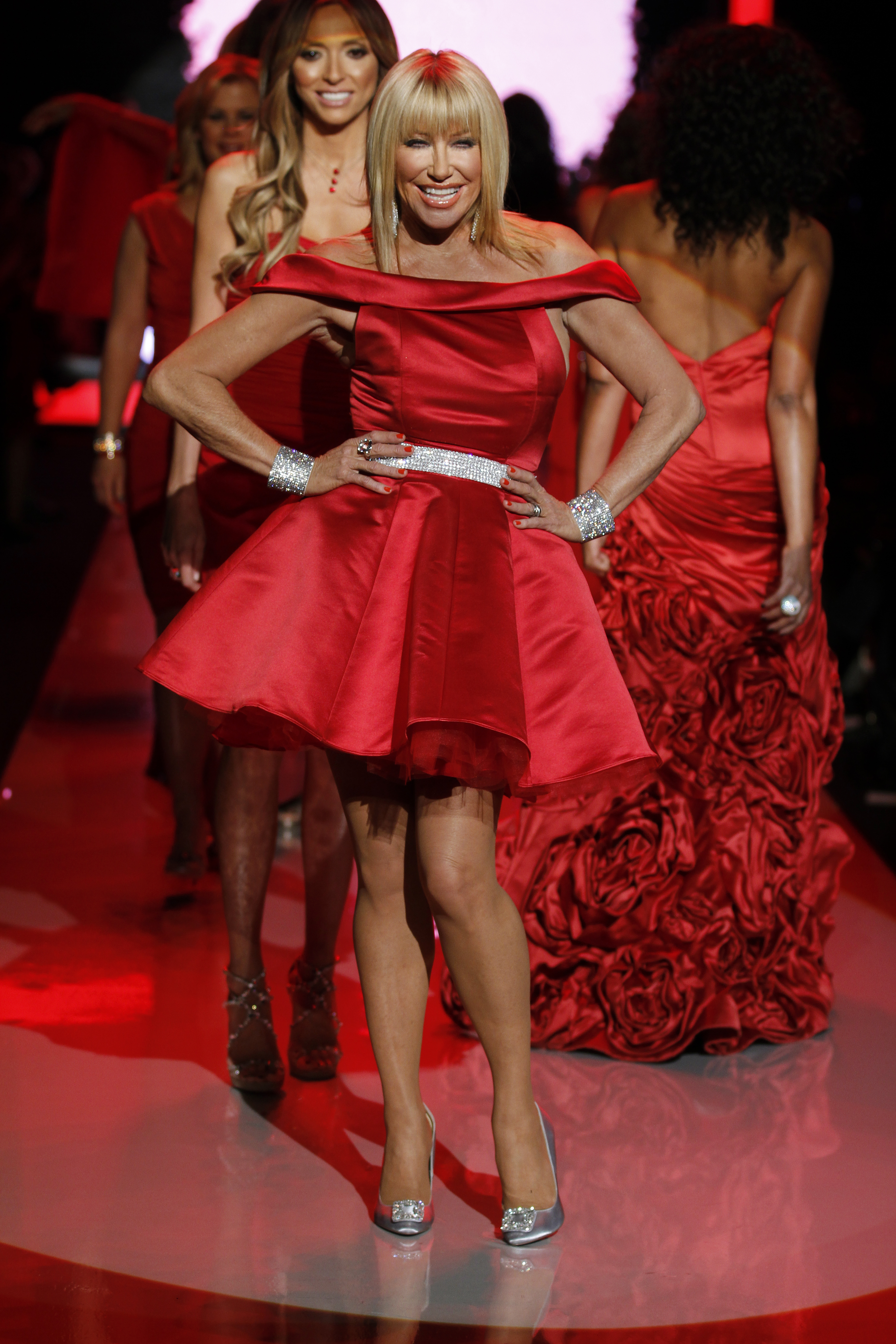
Somers at The Heart Truth's Red Dress Collection Fashion Show (2011). Behind Somers are Giuliana Rancic, Julie Bowen, and Garcelle Beauvais.

In April 2000, Somers was diagnosed with breast cancer. She underwent a lumpectomy and radiation but declined chemotherapy. In November 2008, Somers announced that she had been diagnosed with inoperable cancer by six doctors, but she learned a week later that she was misdiagnosed. During this time, she interviewed doctors about cancer treatments and these interviews became the basis of her 2009 book Knockout about alternative treatments to chemotherapy. In the book, Somers promoted alternative cancer treatments, for which she was criticized by the American Cancer Society, and alternative medical providers such as Stanislaw Burzynski, who has been disciplined by the Texas Medical Board for misleading cancer patients.

In regard to the water-fluoridation controversy, Somers called fluoride a "toxic waste by-product of the aluminum manufacturers."

In January 2013, Somers suggested that Adam Lanza may have been driven to commit the Sandy Hook Elementary School shooting because of the level of toxins in his diet and his exposure to household cleaners.

== Personal life ==
Somers married Bruce Somers on April 14, 1965, and they had a son in November 1965.

In 1968, after divorcing, Somers moved into an apartment in Sausalito, and got work as a prize model on The Anniversary Game, a game show hosted by Alan Hamel. Although he was already married, they began dating; she had an affair with him that led to an abortion. In 1971, her six-year-old son, Bruce Somers, Jr., was struck by a car. The resulting trauma led her to seek therapy for both herself and her son. On November 19, 1977, Somers and Hamel married, and bought a 25-acre estate in Palm Springs, California. In 2021, they sold it for $8.5 million.

In January 2007, a wildfire in Southern California destroyed Somers' home in Malibu, part of the Los Angeles metropolitan area.

Somers described her political views as "very personal", and she identified as an independent voter. In 2013, she criticized Barack Obama saying his administration was "the most divisive of all the administrations that I've ever experienced in my life, and it's become divisive that if you are not part of the group you probably should keep your thought to yourself." In 2018, she expressed support for Donald Trump.

Somers' three granddaughters include Camelia Somers.

=== Health problems and death ===
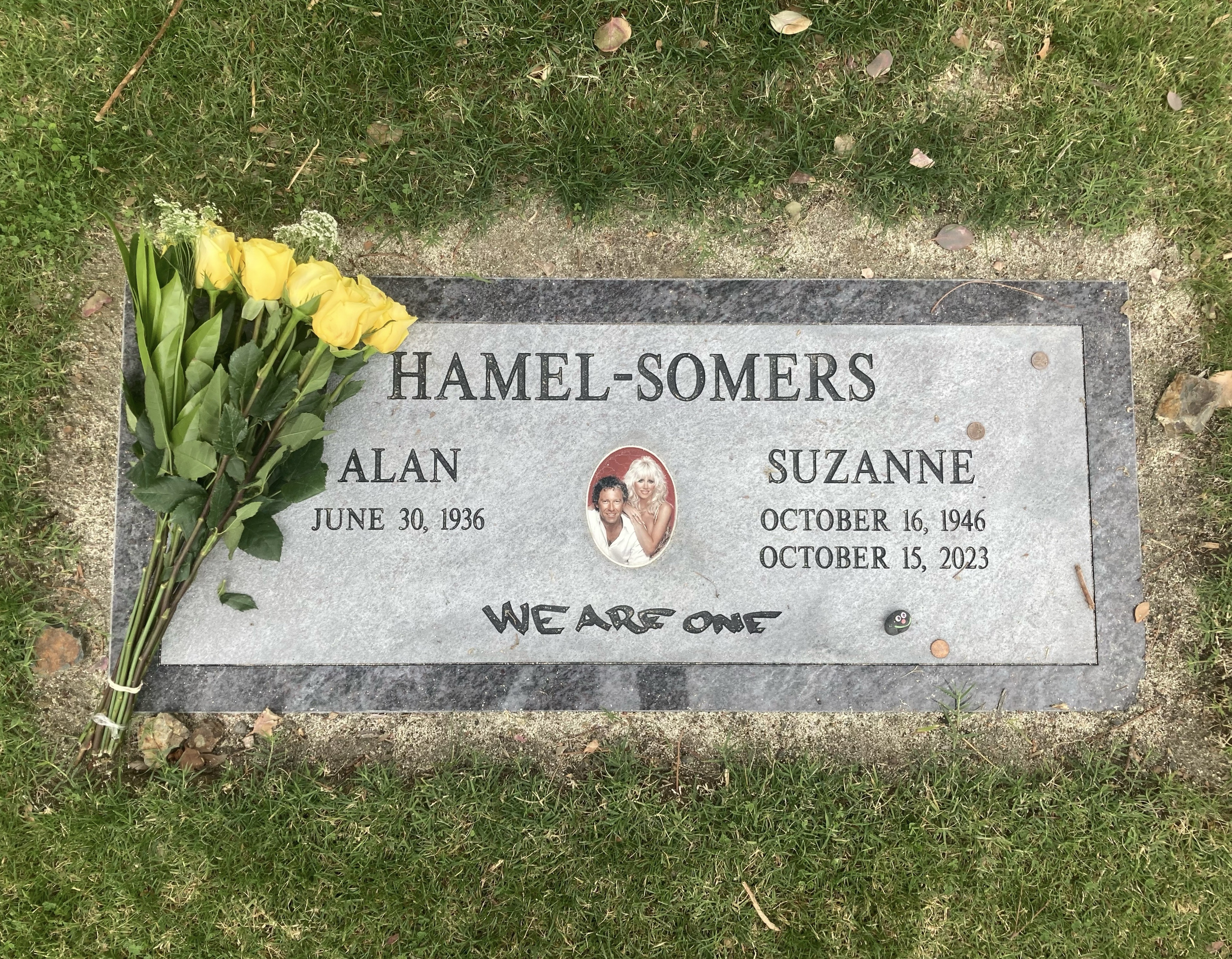
Gravesite of Suzanne Somers at Desert Memorial Park in Cathedral City, California on Friday, November 29, 2024

Somers had hyperplasia in her 20s and skin cancer in her 30s.

In April 2000, Somers was diagnosed with breast cancer and underwent a lumpectomy to remove the cancer, followed by radiation therapy.

In 2018, it was reported that she underwent an experimental stem-cell therapy to regrow the breast she lost to cancer.

Somers died at her home in Palm Springs, California, on October 15, 2023, one day before her 77th birthday. Her death was attributed to breast cancer, which had returned earlier in the year. Her funeral was held three days later, with her interment at Desert Memorial Park.

== Filmography ==
=== Television ===
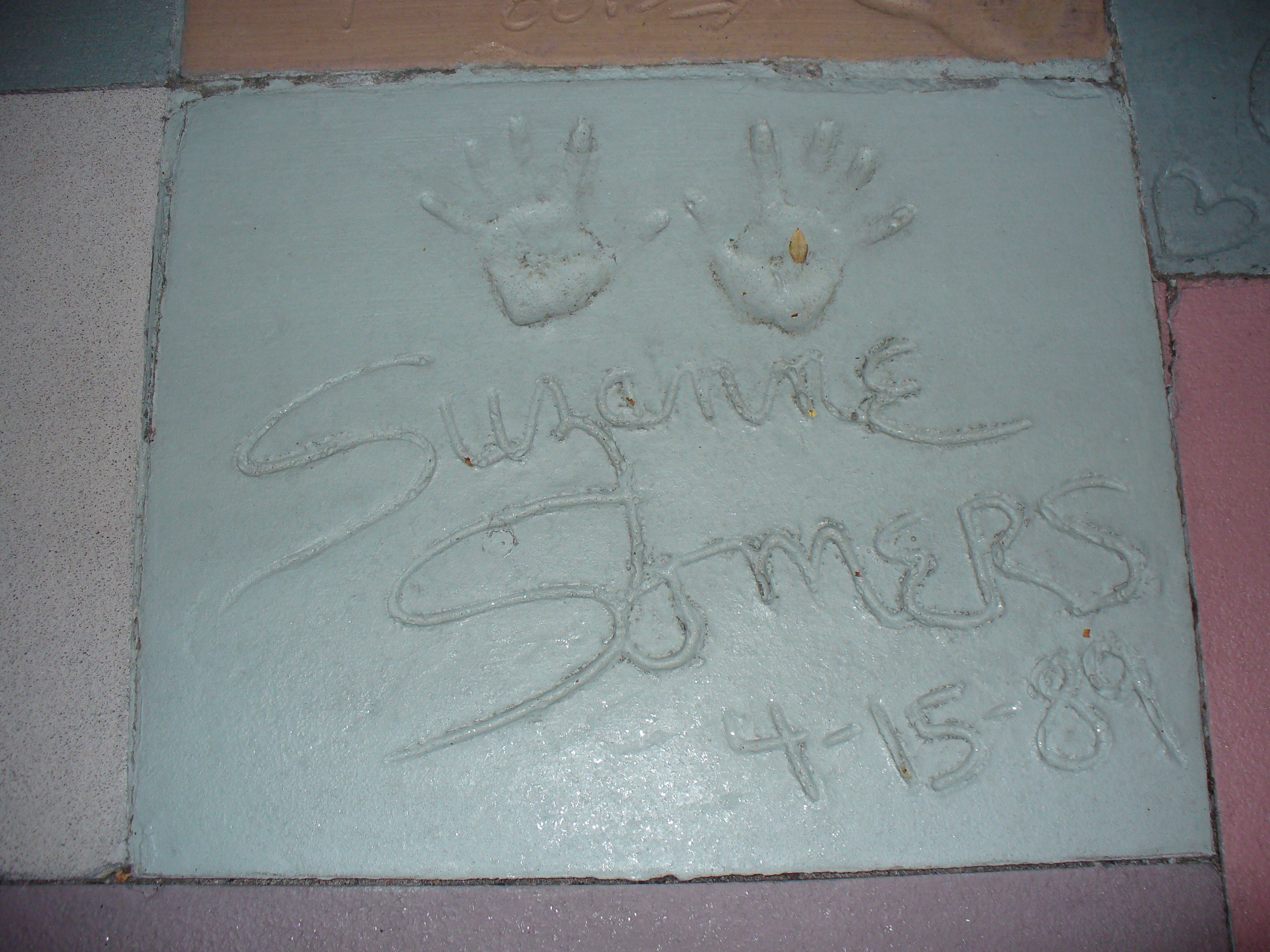
The handprints of Suzanne Somers in front of The Great Movie Ride at Walt Disney World's Disney's Hollywood Studios theme park

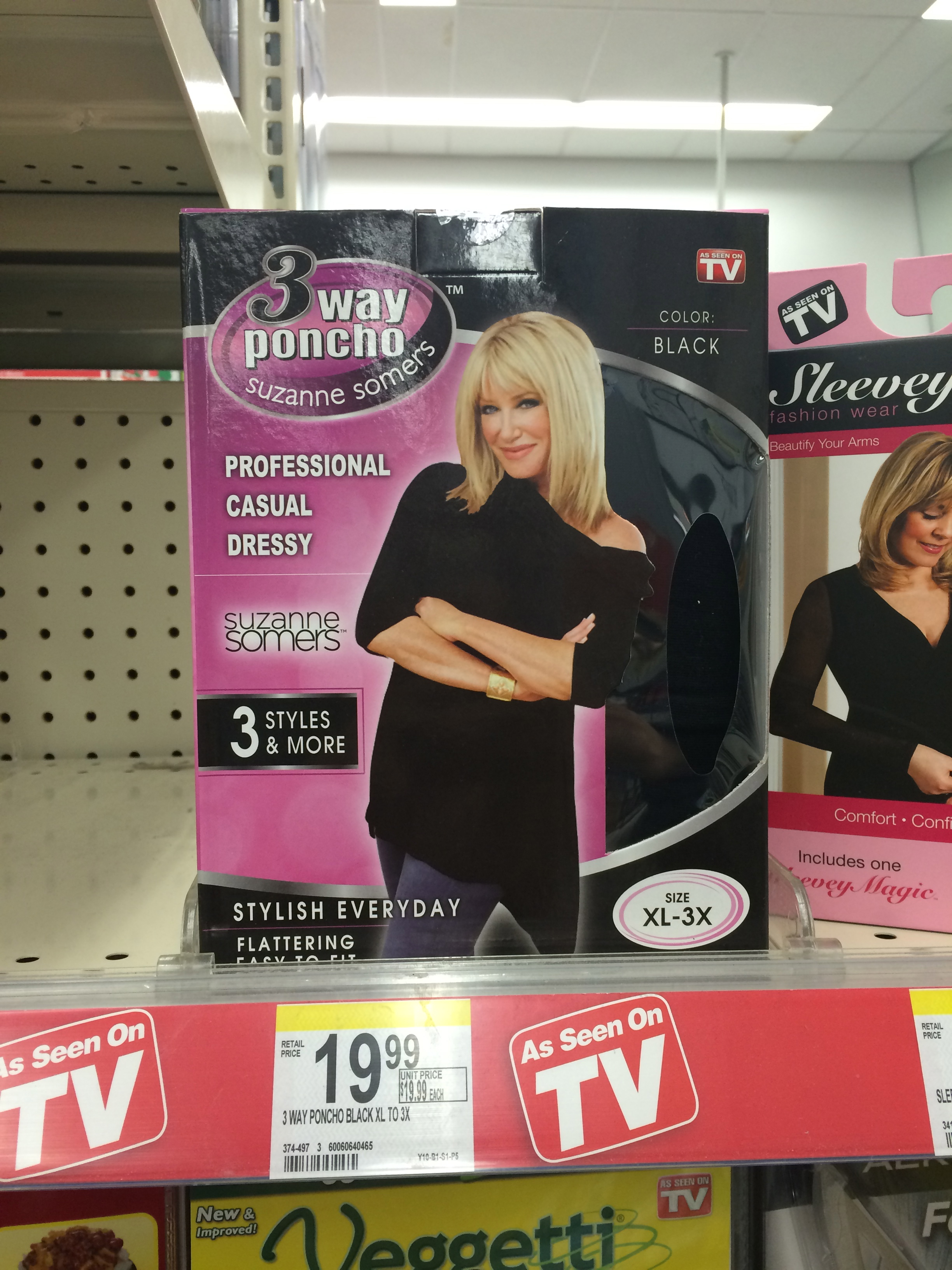
Suzanne Somers three-way poncho on display at Walgreens, an As seen on TV product endorsed by Somers

- Anniversary Game (1969–1970)
- Mantrap (1971–1973)
- Lotsa Luck (1974)
- The Rockford Files – The Big Ripoff (aired October 25, 1974)
- Sky Heist (1975)
- The Six Million Dollar Man (1977)
- Starsky & Hutch (1975–1979, 3 appearances)
- One Day at a Time (1976)
- The Love Boat (1977)
- Three's Company (1977–1981)
- Happily Ever After (1978)
- The Carpenters...Space Encounters (1978)
- Match Game 77 (1977/PM) (1977)
- Tattletales (1977)
- Goodbye Charlie (1985)
- The Simpsons – The Day the Violence Died (1996)
- The Darklings (1999)
- ShopNBC
- Hollywood Wives (1985) (miniseries)
- She's the Sheriff (1987–1989)
- Rich Men, Single Women (1990)
- Step by Step (1991–1998)
- Keeping Secrets (1991)
- Exclusive (1992)
- The Larry Sanders Show (1993)
- The Suzanne Somers Show (1994–1995)
- Full House (1994)
- Seduced by Evil (1994)
- 8-Track Flashback (1995–1998)
- Devil's Food (1996)
- Walt Disney World Christmas Day Parade (1996) (Host)
- Love-Struck (1997)
- Candid Camera (co-host from 1997 to 2000)
- No Laughing Matter (1998)
- Kathy Griffin: My Life on the D-List (2009) (guest appearance)
- The Suzanne Show (2012) (Host)
- The Real Housewives of Beverly Hills (2013) (guest appearance)
- Dancing with the Stars (2015) (contestant)
- Home & Family (2017)

=== Film ===
- Bullitt (1968) as Woman (uncredited)
- Daddy's Gone A-Hunting (1969) as Sidewalk Extra (uncredited)
- Fools (1970) as Woman at Baptism (uncredited)
- American Graffiti (1973) as Blonde in T-Bird
- Magnum Force (1973) as Pool Girl (uncredited)
- It Happened at Lakewood Manor (1977, TV movie) as Gloria
- Zuma Beach (1978, TV movie) as Bonnie Katt
- Yesterday's Hero (1979) as Cloudy
- Nothing Personal (1980) as Abigail Adams
- Serial Mom (1994) as herself
- Rusty: A Dog's Tale (1998) as Malley the Dog (narrator)
- Say It Isn't So (2001) as Gilbert's Mom / herself (cameo, uncredited)

== Published works ==
- Touch Me: The Poems of Suzanne Somers. Los Angeles: Nash Publishing. 1973. ISBN 0840213123. (Hank Saroyan, Photographs)
- Keeping Secrets. Warner Books. 1987. ISBN 978-0-446-51395-1.
- Wednesday's Children: Adult Survivors of Abuse Speak Out. Putnam Adult. 1992. ISBN 0-399-13743-2.
- After the Fall: How I Picked Myself Up, Dusted Myself Off, and Started All Over Again. Crown Publishing Group. 1998. ISBN 0-609-60312-4.
- Suzanne Somers' Get Skinny on Fabulous Food. Crown. 1999. ISBN 978-0-609-60162-4.
- Suzanne Somers' 365 Ways to Change Your Life. Crown Publishing Group. 1999. ISBN 978-0-609-60161-7.
- Suzanne Somers' Eat, Cheat, and Melt the Fat Away. Crown. 2001. ISBN 978-0-609-60722-0.
- Suzanne Somers' Eat Great, Lose Weight (Miniature Editions ed.). Running Press. 2001. ISBN 978-0-7624-1160-3.
- Somersize Desserts. Clarkson Potter. 2001. ISBN 978-0-609-60977-4.
- Suzanne Somers' Fast and Easy: Lose Weight the Somersize Way with Quick, Delicious Meals for the Entire Family!. Crown Publishing Group. 2004. ISBN 978-1-4000-4643-0.
- The Sexy Years: Discover the Hormone Connection – The Secret to Fabulous Sex, Great Health, and Vitality, for Women and Men. Crown Publishing Group. 2004. ISBN 0-609-60721-9.
- Somersize Chocolate. Crown. 2004. ISBN 978-1-4000-5329-2.
- Suzanne Somers' Slim and Sexy Forever: The Hormone Solution for Permanent Weight Loss and Optimal Living. Crown. 2005. ISBN 978-1-4000-5325-4.
- Somersize Cocktails: 30 Sexy Libations from Cool Classics to Unique Concoctions to Stir Up Any Occasion. Crown. 2005. ISBN 978-1-4000-5330-8.
- Somersize Appetizers: 30 Scintillating Starters to Tantalize Your Tastebuds at Every Occasion. Crown. 2005. ISBN 978-1-4000-5331-5.
- Ageless: The Naked Truth About Bioidentical Hormones. Crown Publishing Group. 2006. ISBN 0-307-23724-9.
- Breakthrough: Eight Steps to Wellness. Crown. 2008. ISBN 978-1-4000-5327-8.
- Knockout: Interviews with Doctors Who Are Curing Cancer – And How to Prevent Getting It in the First Place. Crown. 2009. ISBN 978-0-307-58746-6.
- Stay Young & Sexy with Bio-Identical Hormone Replacement: The Science Explained. Smart Publications. 2009. ISBN 978-1-890572-22-8.
- Sexy Forever: How to Fight Fat after Forty. Crown. 2010. ISBN 978-0-307-58851-7.
- The Sexy Forever Recipe Bible. Crown. 2011. ISBN 978-0-307-95670-5.
- Bombshell: Explosive Medical Secrets That Will Redefine Aging. Harmony Books. 2012. ISBN 978-0307-58854-8.
- I'm Too Young for This!: The Natural Hormone Solution to Enjoy Perimenopause. Harmony Books. 2013. ISBN 978-0-385-34769-3.
- TOX-SICK: From Toxic to Not Sick. Harmony Books. 2015. ISBN 978-0-385-34772-3.
- Two's Company: A Fifty-Year Romance with Lessons Learned In Love, Life & Business. Harmony Books. 2017. ISBN 978-0-451-49826-7.

== See also ==
- List of food faddists
