= Inclusion and exclusion criteria =

Traits which permit participation in a clinical trial

In a clinical trial, the investigators must specify inclusion and exclusion criteria for participation in the study.

Inclusion and exclusion criteria define the characteristics that prospective subjects must have if they are to be included in a study. Although there is some unclarity concerning the distinction between the two, the ICH E3 guideline on reporting clinical studies suggests that

- Inclusion criteria concern properties of the target population, defining the population to which the study's results should be generalizable. Inclusion criteria may include factors such as type and stage of disease, the subject’s previous treatment history, age, sex, race, ethnicity.
- Exclusion criteria concern properties of the study sample, defining reasons for which patients from the target population are to be excluded from the current study sample. Typical exclusion criteria are defined for either ethical reasons (e.g., children, pregnant women, patients with psychological illnesses, patients who are not able or willing to sign informed consent), to overcome practical issues related to the study itself (e.g., not being able to read, when questionnaires are used for assessment of outcomes), or to eliminate factors that may limit the interpretability of study results (e.g., comorbidities). Exclusion criteria may lead to biases in the study's results.

== Exclusion criteria ==
Poorly Justified Reasons for Exclusion:

- Any criteria unless the condition or intervention is specific to the criterion, or the criterion has a direct bearing on condition/intervention/results.

Strongly Justified Reasons for Exclusion:

- Unable to provide informed consent
- Placebo or intervention would be harmful
- Lack of equipoise (intervention harmful)
- Effect of intervention difficult to interpret

Potentially Justified Reasons for Exclusion

- Individual may not adhere
- Individual may not complete follow up
- Individuals do not have reliable information

== Example of inclusion and exclusion criteria ==
Coronary Heart Disease

Include criteria:

- Minimum outcomes: coronary deaths & non-fatal myocardial infarction
- Appropriate measures of Framingham variables (Age, sex, LDL, HDL, total cholesterol, diabetes, smoking status, hypertension)
- Cohort, nested case-control, cardiovascular trial follow-up study (or systematic review or meta-analysis of these study types) that measures a novel risk factor and estimates its predictive value after adjusting for Framingham variables

Exclude criteria:

- No data
- Population or sub-population with known coronary disease or coronary disease equivalent (e.g., diabetes)
- Does not include minimum outcomes
- Does not measure Framingham variables appropriately
- Wrong study design/article format

A lesser studied form of exclusion criteria involves an absence of racial, ethnic, or sexual diversity that results in clinical trials that do not reflect the US population. A recent systematic review of the literature of hearing loss in adults, while representative of the US population in terms of sex, does not adequately represent racial or ethnic diversity.

== See also ==
- Drug development
- U.S. Food and Drug Administration (FDA)
- European Medicines Agency
